= Fratton =

Suburb of Portsmouth, Hampshire, England

Coordinates: 50.8008°N 1.0711°W

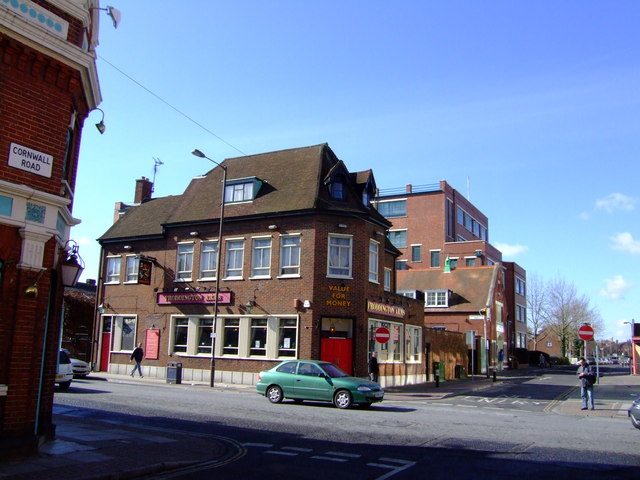
- The Froddington Arms, Fratton

- Location within Hampshire
- Population: 15,314 (2011 Census. Fratton Ward)
- OS grid reference: SU655005
- Unitary authority: Portsmouth
- Ceremonial county: Hampshire
- Region: South East
- Country: England
- Sovereign state: United Kingdom
- Post town: PORTSMOUTH
- Postcode district: PO1
- Dialling code: 023
- Police: Hampshire and Isle of Wight
- Fire: Hampshire and Isle of Wight
- Ambulance: South Central
- UK Parliament: Portsmouth South

Fratton is a residential and formerly industrial area of Portsmouth in Hampshire, England. Victorian style terraced houses are dominant in the area, typical of most residential areas of Portsmouth.

== History ==
The name Fratton was once Froddington, a Saxon name which originally meant "Frodda's Farm" or "Frodda's village". A pub on Fratton Road is still named "The Froddington Arms".

There is a commemorative plaque by the petrol station near Fratton Asda, marking where a bomb shelter was hit by a bomb on 10 January 1941, killing 80 people.

Goldsmith's Farm and Fratton Common were part of the original small rural village originally called Froddington, the only visible evidence of this being the presence of a public house, "The Froddington Arms" on the western side of Fratton Road. Froddington was one of the three small settlements on Portsea Island mentioned in the Domesday Book. Due to developments during the industrial age, more of the surrounding land was absorbed by Portsmouth in the 1870s and 1880s, principally by new housing developments.

== Politics ==
In the UK Parliament, Fratton is represented as part of the Portsmouth South constituency. Since 2017, Stephen Morgan of the Labour Party has been the member of parliament for Portsmouth South.

In local government, Fratton is a Portsmouth City Council ward. It was formed for the 2002 Portsmouth City Council election as the successor to the pre-2002 Fratton ward.

Election	Councillor	Councillor	Councillor
2002	Mike Hancock (Lib Dem)	Philip Shaddock (Lib Dem)	Eleanor Scott (Lib Dem)
2003	Mike Hancock (Lib Dem)	Philip Shaddock (Lib Dem)	Eleanor Scott (Lib Dem)
2004	Mike Hancock (Lib Dem)	Philip Shaddock (Lib Dem)	Eleanor Scott (Lib Dem)
2006	Mike Hancock (Lib Dem)	Philip Shaddock (Lib Dem)	Eleanor Scott (Lib Dem)
2007	Mike Hancock (Lib Dem)	Philip Shaddock (Lib Dem)	Eleanor Scott (Lib Dem)
2008	Mike Hancock (Lib Dem)	David Fuller (Lib Dem)	Eleanor Scott (Lib Dem)
2010	Mike Hancock (Lib Dem)	David Fuller (Con)	Eleanor Scott (Lib Dem)
2011	Mike Hancock (Lib Dem)	David Fuller (Con)	Eleanor Scott (Lib Dem)
2012	Mike Hancock (Lib Dem)	David Fuller (Lib Dem)	Eleanor Scott (Lib Dem)
2014	Julie Swan (UKIP)	David Fuller (Lib Dem)	Eleanor Scott (Lib Dem)
2015	Julie Swan (UKIP)	David Fuller (Lib Dem)	Dave Ashmore (Lib Dem)
2016	Julie Swan (UKIP)	David Fuller (Lib Dem)	Dave Ashmore (Lib Dem)
2018	Tom Coles (Labour)	David Fuller (Lib Dem)	Dave Ashmore (Lib Dem)
2019	Tom Coles (Labour)	David Fuller (Lib Dem)	Dave Ashmore (Lib Dem)

indicates seat up for election.
