= Portsmouth City Council elections =

Local government elections in Hampshire, England

Portsmouth City Council is the local authority for the unitary authority of Portsmouth in Hampshire, England. Until 1 April 1997 it was a non-metropolitan district.

== Political control ==
Since the first election to the council in 1973 following the reforms of the Local Government Act 1972, political control of the council has been held by the following parties:

Composition of the council
Year	Conservative	Labour	Liberal Democrats (Note: Includes totals for the predecessors of the Liberal Democrats, the Liberal Party and SDP (both of which participated in the Alliance).)	PIP	UKIP	Reform UK	Independents & Others	Council control after election
Local government reorganisation; council established (48 seats)
1973	28	17	0	–	–	–	3	Conservative
1976	31	14	0	–	–	–	3	Conservative
1979	31	14	0	–	–	–	3	Conservative
New ward boundaries (39 seats)
1983	25	11	1	–	–	–	2	Conservative
1984	25	11	1	–	–	–	2	Conservative
1986	23	10	5	–	–	–	1	Conservative
1987	24	9	5	–	–	–	1	Conservative
1988	25	8	5	–	–	–	1	Conservative
1990	21	12	5	–	–	–	1	Conservative
1991	19	13	6	–	–	–	1	No overall control
1992	17	14	7	–	–	–	1	No overall control
1994	15	14	9	–	0	–	1	No overall control
1995	11	18	10	–	0	–	0	Labour
1996	6	21	12	–	0	–	0	Labour
1998	8	21	10	–	0	–	0	Labour
1999	10	20	9	–	0	–	0	Labour
2000	'16	15	8	–	0	–	0	No overall control
New ward boundaries (42 seats)
2002	15	14	13	–	0	–	0	No overall control
2003	15	11	16	–	0	–	0	No overall control
2004	15	7	20	–	0	–	0	No overall control
2006	16	5	21	–	0	–	0	No overall control
2007	17	5	19	–	0	–	0	No overall control
2008	19	2	19	–	0	–	2	No overall control
2010	16	2	23	–	0	–	0	Liberal Democrats
2011	17	2	23	–	0	–	0	Liberal Democrats
2012	12	4	26	–	0	–	0	Liberal Democrats
2014	12	4	19	–	6	–	1	No overall control
2015	17	4	14	–	6	–	1	No overall control
2016	19	4	15	–	4	–	1	No overall control
2018	19	6	16	–	0	–	1	No overall control
2019	16	6	18	–	0	–	2	No overall control
2021	16	7	15	–	0	–	4	No overall control
2022	13	9	17	3	0	–	0	No overall control
2023	8	7	18	6	0	–	3	No overall control
2024	4	8	19	9	0	0	2	No overall control
2026	4	3	22	–	0	12	1	Liberal Democrats

== City result maps ==
2002 results map

2003 results map

2004 results map

2006 results map

2007 results map

2008 results map

2010 results map

2011 results map

2012 results map

2014 results map

2015 results map

2016 results map

2018 results map

2019 results map

2021 results map

2022 results map

2023 results map

2024 results map

2026 results map

== By-election results ==
=== 2002–2006 ===
Drayton & Farlington by-election 1 September 2005
Party	Candidate	Votes	%	±%
Conservative	Stephen Wemyss	2,148	50.9	+4.2
Liberal Democrats	Patrict Whittle	1,973	46.7	+4.3
English Democrat	David Knight	102	2.4	+2.4
Majority		175	4.2	
Turnout		4,223	43.0	
Conservative hold		Swing		

=== 2006–2010 ===
Fratton by-election 16 August 2007
Party	Candidate	Votes	%	±%
Liberal Democrats	David Fuller	1,196	58.6	+2.6
Conservative	Gerry Oldfield	496	24.3	+1.3
Labour	Simon Payne	144	7.1	−5.4
English Democrat	David Knight	131	6.4	−2.1
Green	Sean Sanders	56	2.7	+2.7
Independent	Mark Austin	17	0.8	+0.8
Majority		700	34.3	+1.3
Turnout		2,040	20.7	
Liberal Democrats hold		Swing		

Nelson by-election 27 September 2007
Party	Candidate	Votes	%	±%
Labour	Sarah Cook	791	35.0	+3.2
Conservative	Jim Fleming	682	30.2	+3.3
Liberal Democrats	Alex Naylor	548	24.2	−2.9
UKIP	Michelle Essery	90	4.0	+4.0
Green	Calum Kennedy	78	3.5	−2.9
English Democrat	Clive Percy	71	3.1	−4.4
Majority		109	4.8	
Turnout		2,260	22.4	
Labour hold		Swing		

Copnor by-election 7 February 2008
Party	Candidate	Votes	%	±%
Liberal Democrats	Andy Fraser	1,835	55.8	+38.4
Conservative	Jim Fleming	904	27.5	−18.6
Labour	Terry O'Brien	349	10.6	−8.2
English Democrat	David Knight	117	3.6	−13.6
UKIP	Michelle Essery	57	1.7	+1.7
Independent	Mark Austin	28	0.9	+0.9
Majority		931	28.3	
Turnout		3,290	33.9	
Liberal Democrats gain from Conservative		Swing		

=== 2022–2026 ===
Paulsgrove by-election 23 October 2025
Party	Candidate	Votes	%	±%
Reform	Joe Standen	1,770	64.3	+64.3
Conservative	Thomas Hoare	311	11.3	−4.0
Labour	Sydna Phillips	289	10.5	−4.1
Liberal Democrats	Michelle Simmons	239	8.7	+5.8
Green	Georgina Ayling	143	5.2	+1.8
Majority		1,459	53.0	
Turnout		2,752		
Reform gain from PIP		Swing		

== See also ==
Non-metropolitan district elections

- 1973 Portsmouth City Council election
- 1983 Portsmouth City Council election (New ward boundaries)

Unitary authority elections

- 1998 Portsmouth City Council election
- 1999 Portsmouth City Council election
- 2000 Portsmouth City Council election
- 2002 Portsmouth City Council election (New ward boundaries increased the number of seats by 3)
- 2003 Portsmouth City Council election
- 2004 Portsmouth City Council election
- 2006 Portsmouth City Council election
- 2007 Portsmouth City Council election
- 2008 Portsmouth City Council election
- 2010 Portsmouth City Council election
- 2011 Portsmouth City Council election
- 2012 Portsmouth City Council election
- 2014 Portsmouth City Council election
- 2015 Portsmouth City Council election
- 2016 Portsmouth City Council election
- 2018 Portsmouth City Council election
- 2019 Portsmouth City Council election
- 2021 Portsmouth City Council election
- 2022 Portsmouth City Council election
- 2023 Portsmouth City Council election
- 2024 Portsmouth City Council election
- 2026 Portsmouth City Council election
