= 2018 Portsmouth City Council election =

2018 UK local government election

← 2016	3 May 2018	2019 →

14 of 42 seats (One Third) to Portsmouth City Council 22 seats needed for a majority
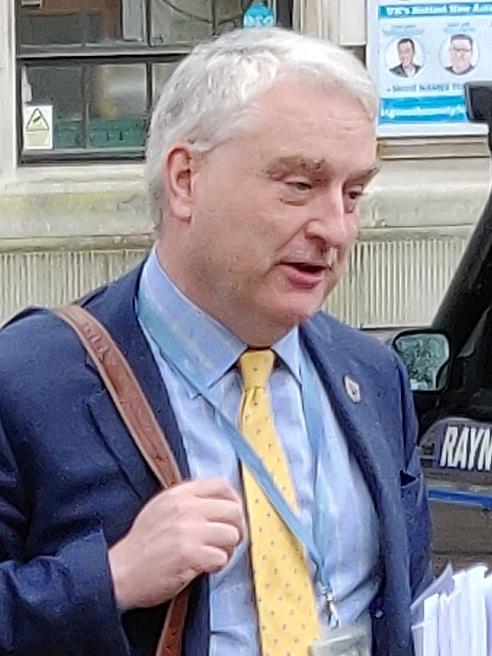

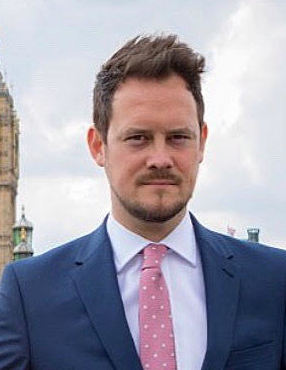
	First party	Second party
	Con
Leader	Donna Jones	Gerald Vernon-Jackson
Party	Conservative	Liberal Democrats
Leader since	June 2014	May 2004
Leader's seat	Hilsea	Milton
Last election	5 (2014)	3 (2014)
Seats before	7	3
Seats won	6 (19 total)	4 (16 total)
Seat change	▼1	▲1
Popular vote	17,058	11,739
Percentage	37%	25%
Swing	▲9.7%	▼4.3%
	Third party	Fourth party
		UKIP
Leader	Stephen Morgan	Colin Galloway
Party	Labour	UKIP
Leader since	October 2016	May 2014
Leader's seat	Charles Dickens	Nelson
Last election	0 (2014)	6 (2014)
Seats before	2	2
Seats won	4 (5 total)	0 (0 total)
Seat change	▲3	▼2
Popular vote	13,782	996
Percentage	32%	2%
Swing	▲8.1%	▼13.0%
Council control before election
No overall control
Council control after election
No overall control

Map of the results of the 2018 Portsmouth council election. Liberal Democrats in orange, Conservatives in blue and Labour in red.

The 2018 Portsmouth City Council election took place on Thursday 3 May 2018 to elect members of Portsmouth City Council.

14 of 42 seats were contested during this elections within the unitary authority.

After this year's local elections, the composition of the council is now (compared to the situation immediately prior to the election):

Party	Before Election	After Election	Change
Conservative	20	19	-1
Liberal Democrats	15	16	+1
Labour	2	6	+4
Independent	2	1	-1
UKIP	2	0	-2
Green	0	0	0

The Statement of Persons Nominated was made on 6 April 2018 by Returning Officer David Williams.

Following the elections, a Liberal Democrat minority administration was formed, with the support of Labour. This replaced the previous Conservative minority administration that had governed since 2014.

== Ward results ==
=== Baffins ===
Baffins
Party	Candidate	Votes	%	±%
Liberal Democrats	Jeanette Smith	1,421	37.4	▲8.5
Conservative	Terry Norton	1,285	33.8	▲12.9
Labour	Liam Turish	794	20.9	▲4.2
UKIP	Todd Sweeney	169	4.4	▼26.9
Green	Bob Simmonds	132	3.5	N/A
Majority		136	3.6	N/A
Turnout		3,801	34.2	▲0.1
Liberal Democrats gain from UKIP		Swing	17.7	

=== Central Southsea ===
Central Southsea
Party	Candidate	Votes	%	±%
Labour	George Fielding	1,721	44.1	▲28.3
Liberal Democrats	Lee Hunt*	1,377	35.3	▲4.0
Conservative	Prab Ghosh	627	16.1	▼1.3
Green	Tim Sheerman-Chase	181	4.6	▼12.3
Majority		344	8.8	N/A
Turnout		3,906	36.0	▲5.4
Labour gain from Liberal Democrats		Swing		

=== Charles Dickens ===
Charles Dickens
Party	Candidate	Votes	%	±%
Labour	Claire Udy^{1}	844	33.9	▲10.2
Liberal Democrats	Sarah Shreeve	729	29.3	▼1.3
Conservative	Syed Haque	619	24.9	▲14.0
Independent	Paul Godier*	155	5.7	▼26.1^{2}
Green	Sarah Gilbert	141	5.7	N/A
Majority		115	4.6	N/A
Turnout		2500	19.7	▼4.6
Labour gain from UKIP		Swing	5.8%	

1: After nominations were closed, Udy resigned from the Labour Party citing a lack of support from the local party while under investigation by the National Executive Committee.
2: Godier's share compared to his performance under UKIP label in 2014.

=== Copnor ===
Copnor
Party	Candidate	Votes	%	±%
Conservative	Ben Swann	1,355	46.8	▲16.6
Labour	Mo Quinn	824	28.5	▲7.5
Liberal Democrats	Ross Campbell	423	14.6	▼1.1
UKIP	Terry Chipperfield-Harrison	161	5.6	▼26.0
Green	Ken Hawkins	130	4.5	N/A
Majority		531	18.4	N/A
Turnout		2,893	29.5	▼2.9
Conservative gain from UKIP		Swing		

=== Cosham ===
Cosham
Party	Candidate	Votes	%	±%
Conservative	Hannah Hockaday*	1,614	52.7	▲21.7
Labour	Graham Heaney	954	31.1	▲8.4
Liberal Democrats	Helena Cole	213	7.0	▼9.0
UKIP	Michael Jerome	173	5.6	▼18.4
Independent	Peter Marcus	110	3.6	N/A
Majority		660	21.6	▲14.6
Turnout		3064	29.7	▼6.1
Conservative hold		Swing		

=== Drayton and Farlington ===
Drayton and Farlington
Party	Candidate	Votes	%	±%
Conservative	Simon Bosher*	2,588	67.3	▲14.3
Labour	Sue Castillon	918	23.9	▲7.6
Liberal Democrats	Paul Pritchard	340	8.8	▲1.5
Majority		1670	43.4	▲12.5
Turnout		3846	36.8	▼2.9
Conservative hold		Swing		

=== Eastney and Craneswater ===
Eastney and Craneswater
Party	Candidate	Votes	%	±%
Conservative	Luke Stubbs*	1,763	43.6	▲3.9
Labour	Luke Evans	1,144	28.3	▲18.8
Liberal Democrats	Tracy McClure	969	23.9	▼4.4
Green	Menno Groen	172	4.2	▼2.3
Majority		619	15.3	▲3.9
Turnout		4,060	42.0	▲2.3
Conservative hold		Swing		

=== Fratton ===
Fratton
Party	Candidate	Votes	%	±%
Labour	Tom Coles	1,108	37.5	▲11.4
Liberal Democrats	Stuart Brown	1,036	35.0	▲13.3
Conservative	Tony Sarigul	543	18.4	▲1.2
UKIP	Kevin Chippindall-Higgins	154	5.2	▼26.0
Green	Mike Wines	114	3.9	N/A
Majority		72	2.5	N/A
Turnout		2955	28.5	▲1.4
Labour gain from UKIP		Swing		

=== Hilsea ===
Hilsea
Party	Candidate	Votes	%	±%
Conservative	Frank Jonas*	1,739	57.4	▲16.6
Labour	Graham Mitchell	868	28.6	▲3.2
Liberal Democrats	Peter Williams	224	7.4	▲1.1
Green	Emma Murphy	199	6.6	N/A
Majority		871	28.8	▲13.4
Turnout		3030	29.3	▼2.5
Conservative hold		Swing		

=== Milton ===
Milton
Party	Candidate	Votes	%	±%
Liberal Democrats	Ben Dowling*	1,656	41.7	▲11.5
Labour	Rajah Ghosh	1,264	31.8	▲10.6
Conservative	Josh Ahmed	856	21.6	▲0.7
Green	Tamara Groen	193	4.9	N/A
Majority		392	9.9	▲4.2
Turnout		3,969	36.6	▲3.1
Liberal Democrats hold		Swing		

=== Nelson ===
Nelson
Party	Candidate	Votes	%	±%
Liberal Democrats	Jason Fazackarley	1,124	40.1	▲10.4
Labour	Rumal Khan	768	27.4	▲3.5
Conservative	Alicia Denny	625	22.3	▲8.6
UKIP	Colin Galloway*	148	5.3	▼25.9
Green	Duncan Robinson	136	4.9	N/A
Majority		356	12.7	N/A
Turnout		2801	27.2	▼1.9
Liberal Democrats gain from UKIP		Swing		

=== Paulsgrove ===
Paulsgrove
Party	Candidate	Votes	%	±%
Conservative	Jo Hooper	1,224	45.7	▲25.6
Labour	David Horne	1,100	41.0	▲10.7
UKIP	Stuart Potter*	191	7.1	▼32.9
Liberal Democrats	Iain Sutherland	165	6.2	▲1.8
Majority		124	4.7	N/A
Turnout		2680	26.4	▼0.3
Conservative gain from UKIP		Swing		

=== St Jude ===
St Jude
Party	Candidate	Votes	%	±%
Labour	Judith Smyth	1,270	36.4	▲24.5
Conservative	Linda Symes*	1,165	33.4	▼2.9
Liberal Democrats	Richard Adair	867	24.8	▼1.4
Green	Chris Jolley	187	5.4	▼6.6
Majority		105	3.0	▼6.7
Turnout		3,496	38.2	N/A
Labour gain from Conservative		Swing	13.7	

=== St Thomas ===
St Thomas
Party	Candidate	Votes	%	±%
Liberal Democrats	Rob Wood*	1,195	34.6	▼1.2
Conservative	Terry Henderson	1,055	30.4	▼0.4
Labour	Sumel Chowdhury	1,049	30.4	▲15.5
Green	Bekkie Kingsley-Smith	154	4.5	N/A
Majority		140	4.2	▼0.6
Turnout		3,463	33.3	▼0.6
Liberal Democrats hold		Swing	0.4	

Preceded by 2016 Portsmouth City Council election	Portsmouth City Council elections	Succeeded by 2019 Portsmouth City Council election
