= 2015 Portsmouth City Council election =

2015 UK local government election

← 2014	7 May 2015	2016 →

14 of the 42 seats to Portsmouth City Council 22 seats needed for a majority
	First party	Second party	Third party
Party	Conservative	Liberal Democrats	Labour
Seats before	4	9	1
Seats won	9	4	1
Seat change	▲5	▼5	Steady
Popular vote	30,193	17,342	17,060
Percentage	34.3%	19.7%	19.4%
- Map of 2015 results
Council control before election
No Overall Control
Council control after election
No Overall Control

The 2015 Portsmouth City Council election took place on 7 May 2015 to elect members of Portsmouth City Council in England. This was on the same day as other local elections.

Following the elections, the Conservatives remained in control of the council, continuing to govern in a minority administration

== Election results ==
Portsmouth City Council election result 2015
Party	Seats	Gains	Losses	Net gain/loss	Seats %	Votes %	Votes	+/−
Conservative	9	5	0	▲5	64.3	34.3	30,193	▼2.9
Liberal Democrats	4	0	5	▼5	28.6	19.7	17,342	▼13.2
Labour	1	1	1	Steady	7.1	19.4	17,060	▼6.5
UKIP	0	0	0	Steady	0.0	16.7	14,734	▲16.7
Green	0	0	0	Steady	0.0	8.4	7,426	▲7.5
TUSC	0	0	0	Steady	0.0	1.1	1,003	▲0.3
Independent	0	0	0	Steady	0.0	0.3	285	Steady

=== Change in composition ===
After the 2015 local election, the political makeup of the council was as follows: These seats were then next contested in 2019.

Party	Number of councillors
Labour	4
Conservative	19
Liberal Democrats	14
UKIP	4
Green	0
Independent	1

== Results by ward ==
Comparisons for the purpose of determining a gain, hold or loss of a seat, and for all percentage changes, are to the last time these specific seats were up for election in 2011. A "*" indicates that that councillor was re-elected.

Baffins
Party	Candidate	Votes	%	±%
Liberal Democrats	Lynne Stagg*	2,198	30.0	
Conservative	George Edgar	2,044	27.9	
UKIP	Matt Ainsworth	1,580	21.6	
Labour	Michelle Treacher	1,061	14.5	
Green	Sarah Coote	379	5.2	
TUSC	Wendy Hamm	55	0.8	
Majority		154	2.1	
Turnout		7,317	63.9	+24.7
Liberal Democrats hold		Swing		

Central Southsea
Party	Candidate	Votes	%	±%
Liberal Democrats	Suzy Horton	2,026	30.7	
Conservative	Kevin Warne	1,424	21.6	
Green	Ian David McCulloch	1,384	21.0	
Labour	Benjamin Perry	1,064	16.1	
UKIP	Derek William Arthur Wareham	623	9.4	
TUSC	Daniel Sutton-Johanson	82	1.2	
Majority		602	9.1	
Turnout		6,603		
Liberal Democrats hold		Swing		

Charles Dickens
Party	Candidate	Votes	%	±%
Labour	Yahiya Chowdhury	1,373	25.5	
Liberal Democrats	Jacqui Hancock	1,361	25.3	
UKIP	Carl Edward John Paddon	1,200	22.3	
Conservative	Christopher John Hirst	987	18.4	
Green	Hannah Mary Dawson	367	6.8	
TUSC	Chris Pickett	88	1.6	
Majority		602	0.2	
Turnout		5,376		
Labour gain from Liberal Democrats		Swing		

Copnor
Party	Candidate	Votes	%	±%
Conservative	Kevin Warne	2,732	42.2	
UKIP	Terry Chipperfield-Harrison	1,484	22.9	
Labour	Terry King	1,428	22.1	
Liberal Democrats	Alan John Webb	446	6.9	
Green	Mark William Townsin	315	4.9	
TUSC	Daniel Sutton-Johanson	70	1.1	
Majority		602	19.3	
Turnout		6,475		
Conservative hold		Swing		

Cosham
Party	Candidate	Votes	%	±%
Conservative	Lee Michael Chris John Mason	2,768	42.3	
Labour	Graham Philip Heaney	1,525	23.3	
UKIP	Mike Jerome	1,381	21.1	
Liberal Democrats	Kirstine McDowell Impey	466	7.1	
Green	Ash Potter	318	4.9	
TUSC	Adi Graham	90	1.4	
Majority		602	19.0	
Turnout		6,548		
Conservative hold		Swing		

Drayton & Farlington
Party	Candidate	Votes	%	±%
Conservative	Ken Ellcome	4,953	65.9	
Labour	Andreas Bubel	1,347	17.9	
Green	Gavin Mark Ellis	538	7.2	
Liberal Democrats	Tom Wood	524	7.0	
TUSC	Simon Wade	150	2.0	
Majority				
Turnout		7,512		
Conservative hold		Swing		

Eastney & Craneswater
Party	Candidate	Votes	%	±%
Conservative	Jennie Brent	2,574	39.8	
Liberal Democrats	Paul Frank Pritchard	1,500	23.2	
UKIP	Garth Peter Leonard Hessey	890	13.7	
Labour	Julian Paul Wright	805	12.4	
Green	Katie Jane Worsfold	646	10.0	
TUSC	Paul John Smith	60	0.9	
Majority				
Turnout		6,475	64.2	
Conservative gain from Liberal Democrats		Swing		

Fratton
Party	Candidate	Votes	%	±%
Liberal Democrats	Dave Ashmore	1,497	26.2	
UKIP	Paul Daniel Lovegrove	1,194	20.9	
Labour	Sue Castillon	1,127	19.7	
Conservative	Massoud Esmaili	1,122	19.7	
Green	Martin Peter Cox	408	7.1	
Independent	Mike Hancock	285	5.0	
TUSC	John Paul Pickett	74	1.3	
Majority				
Turnout		5,707		
Liberal Democrats hold		Swing		

Hilsea
Party	Candidate	Votes	%	±%
Conservative	Scott Robert Harris	2,829	43.5	
Labour	Sue Greenfield	1,547	23.8	
UKIP	Kevan Chippindall-Higgin	1,311	20.1	
Liberal Democrats	Joshua Dulberg	437	6.7	
Green	Abbie Eales	329	5.1	
TUSC	Doug Willis	54	0.8	
Majority				
Turnout		6,507		
Conservative hold		Swing		

Milton
Party	Candidate	Votes	%	±%
Liberal Democrats	Gerald Vernon-Jackson	2,291	33.7	
Conservative	Stuart John Crow	1,728	25.4	
UKIP	Robbie Robinson	1,018	15.0	
Labour	Alex Bentley	948	13.9	
Green	Jay Dunstan	763	11.2	
TUSC	Sean Hoyle	57	0.8	
Majority				
Turnout		6,805		
Liberal Democrats hold		Swing		

Nelson
Party	Candidate	Votes	%	±%
Conservative	Ian Colin Sinclair Lyon	1,360	24.5	
UKIP	Barry Paul Davies	1,347	24.3	
Labour	Rob Smith	1,298	23.4	
Liberal Democrats	Leo Madden	1,221	22.0	
Green	Bianca Barbara Vermeulen-Smith	249	4.5	
TUSC	Nicholas John Doyle	65	1.2	
Majority				
Turnout		5,540		
Conservative gain from Liberal Democrats		Swing		

Paulsgrove
Party	Candidate	Votes	%	±%
Conservative	Gemma Louise New	1,814	32.9	
Labour	David Ratcliffe Horne	1,745	31.6	
UKIP	David Allen Cox	1,417	25.7	
Liberal Democrats	Maria Cole	258	4.7	
Green	Phil Dickinson	243	4.4	
TUSC	Sean Hoyle	42	0.8	
Majority				
Turnout		5,519		
Conservative gain from Labour		Swing		

St Jude
Party	Candidate	Votes	%	±%
Conservative	David Tompkins	1,944	34.1	
Liberal Democrats	Michael Andrewes	1,499	26.3	
Labour	Tony Chafer	843	14.8	
Green	James Quinn	781	13.7	
UKIP	Bev Hastings	572	10.0	
TUSC	Andy Waterman	67	1.2	
Majority		445	7.8	
Turnout		5,706	59.8	
Conservative gain from Liberal Democrats		Swing		

St Thomas
Party	Candidate	Votes	%	±%
Conservative	Ryan Brent	1,914	32.2	
Liberal Democrats	Jason Fazackarley	1,618	27.2	
Labour	Barbara Spiegelhalter	949	15.9	
UKIP	Paul Sweeney	717	12.0	
Green	Anna Koor	706	11.9	
TUSC	Aron Fielder	49	0.8	
Majority		296	5.0	
Turnout		5,953	57.0	
Conservative gain from Liberal Democrats		Swing		

Preceded by 2014 Portsmouth City Council election	Portsmouth City Council elections	Succeeded by 2016 Portsmouth City Council election
