= 2016 Portsmouth City Council election =

2016 UK local government election

← 2015	5 May 2016	2018 →

14 of 42 seats (One Third) to Portsmouth City Council 22 seats needed for a majority

	First party	Second party
Leader	Gerald Vernon-Jackson	Donna Jones
Party	Liberal Democrats	Conservative
Leader's seat	Milton	Hilsea
Seats won	8 (15 total)	4 (19 total)
Seat change	▼1	▲1
Popular vote	12,795	12,016
Percentage	29.3%	27.3%
Swing	▲9.6%	▼7.1%
	Third party	Fourth party
Leader	John Ferrett	Colin Galloway
Party	Labour	UKIP
Leader's seat	Paulsgrove	Nelson
Seats won	2 (4 total)	0 (4 total)
Seat change	Steady	Steady
Popular vote	10,439	6,547
Percentage	23.9%	15.0%
Swing	▲4.5%	▼1.7%
Council control before election
No overall control
Council control after election
No overall control

Map of the results of the 2016 Portsmouth council election. Liberal Democrats in orange, Conservatives in blue and Labour in red.

The 2016 Portsmouth City Council election took place on 5 May 2016 to elect members of Portsmouth City Council. This took place on the same day as other local elections taking place around the UK, including the London Mayoral election, Scottish Parliament and Welsh Assembly elections.

14 of 42 seats were contested during these elections within this unitary authority.

After this year's local elections, the composition of the council is now (compared to the situation immediately prior to the election):

- Conservatives: 19 (0)
- Liberal Democrats: 15 (+1)
- UKIP: 4 (0)
- Labour: 3 (0)
- Independent: 1 (-1)

Following the election, the Conservative minority administration that had governed Portsmouth since 2014 continued in office.

== Election result ==
Comparisons for the purpose of determining a gain, hold or loss of a seat, and for all percentage changes, is to the last time these specific seats were up for election in 2012.

Portsmouth local election result 2016
Party	Seats	Gains	Losses	Net gain/loss	Seats %	Votes %	Votes	+/−
Liberal Democrats	8	1	2	-1	57.1	29.3	12,795	-6.8
Conservative	4	1	0	+1	28.6	27.5	12,016	-3.2
Labour	2	1	1	0	14.2	23.9	10,439	-3.2
UKIP	0	0	0	0	0	15.0	6,547	+15.0
Green	0	0	0	0	0	4.2	1,817	+2.2
TUSC	0	0	0	0	0	0.1	30	-2.7

== Ward results ==
Baffins
Party	Candidate	Votes	%	±%
Liberal Democrats	Darren Sanders*	1,759	47.5	−0.8
Conservative	George Edgar	691	18.7	−4.2
UKIP	Kevin Chippandall-Higgin	671	18.1	+18.1
Labour	John Castillon	580	15.7	−2.1
Majority		1,068	28.8	+3.4
Turnout		3,701	33.5	+5.6
Liberal Democrats hold		Swing	1.7% Con to LD	

Central Southsea
Party	Candidate	Votes	%	±%
Liberal Democrats	Steve Pitt	1,364	40.9	−1.5
Labour	Frank Minal	804	24.1	−1.6
Green	Ian McCulloch	444	13.3	+3.7
Conservative	Massoud Esmaili	401	12.0	−5.0
UKIP	Derek Wareham	323	9.7	+9.7
Majority		560	16.8	+0.1
Turnout		3,336	32.4	+9.1
Liberal Democrats hold		Swing	0.05% Lab to LD	

Charles Dickens
Party	Candidate	Votes	%	±%
Labour	Stephen Morgan	948	33.9	+2.2
Liberal Democrats	Margaret Foster*	885	31.7	−14.4
UKIP	Andrew Waters	543	19.4	+19.4
Conservative	John Hill	287	10.3	−1.1
Green	Hannah Dawson	130	4.7	−2.1
Majority		63	2.2	−12.2
Turnout		2,793	25.7	+4.5
Labour gain from Liberal Democrats		Swing	8.3% LD to Lab	

Copnor
Party	Candidate	Votes	%	±%
Conservative	Neill Young*	1,010	35.9	+3.6
Labour	Rumal Khan	815	29.0	+6.5
UKIP	Terry Chipperfield-Harrison	717	25.5	+25.5
Liberal Democrats	Jaison Matewu	269	9.6	−11.4
Majority		195	6.9	−2.9
Turnout		2,811	28.4	+2.9
Conservative hold		Swing	1.5% Con to Lab	

Cosham
Party	Candidate	Votes	%	±%
Conservative	Jim Fleming	1,251	41.2	+11.0
Labour	Graham Heaney	878	28.9	−3.0
UKIP	Mel Todd	647	21.3	+21.3
Liberal Democrats	Kirstine Impey	263	8.7	−24.6
Majority		373	12.3	+10.9
Turnout		3,039	29.3	−0.6
Conservative gain from Liberal Democrats		Swing	7.0% Lab to Con	

The incumbent councillor, Aiden Grey, was elected as a Liberal Democrat but defected to Labour six months after his election.

Drayton and Farlington
Party	Candidate	Votes	%	±%
Conservative	Steve Wemyss*	1,977	55.0	−5.0
Labour	Andreas Bubel	733	20.4	−4.7
UKIP	Loreley Lawrence	555	15.4	+15.4
Liberal Democrats	Josh Dulberg	330	9.2	−5.7
Majority		1,244	34.6	−0.3
Turnout		3,595	35.4	+0.8
Conservative hold		Swing	0.2% Con to Lab	

Eastney and Craneswater
Party	Candidate	Votes	%	±%
Liberal Democrats	Matthew Winnington*	1,599	43.3	−2.0
Conservative	Susan Lloyd	1,278	34.6	−0.4
Labour	Julian Wright	500	13.6	−1.7
Green	Menno Groen	313	8.5	+8.5
Majority		321	8.7	−1.6
Turnout		3,690	39.3	+7.0
Liberal Democrats hold		Swing	0.8% LD to Con	

Fratton
Party	Candidate	Votes	%	±%
Liberal Democrats	David Fuller*	860	32.0	−17.6
Labour	Thomas Coles	733	27.2	+1.8
UKIP	Todd Sweeney	584	21.7	+21.7
Conservative	Laurence Warren-West	354	13.2	−3.9
Green	Martin Cox	160	5.9	+5.9
Majority		127	4.8	−19.4
Turnout		2,691	26.6	+6.3
Liberal Democrats hold		Swing	9.7% LD to Lab	

Hilsea
Party	Candidate	Votes	%	±%
Conservative	Donna Jones*	1,566	54.6	+10.2
Labour	Silvi Veale	922	32.1	−9.6
Liberal Democrats	Julie Spurgeon	380	13.2	−0.7
Majority		644	22.5	+19.8
Turnout		2,868	27.9	+1.6
Conservative hold		Swing	9.9% Lab to Con	

Milton
Party	Candidate	Votes	%	±%
Liberal Democrats	Will Purvis*	1,488	42.6	−9.5
Labour	Alex Bentley	614	17.6	−6.9
Conservative	Malcolm Chewter	563	16.1	−7.3
UKIP	Robbie Robinson	559	16.0	+16.0
Green	Kylie Barton	269	7.7	+7.7
Majority		874	25.0	−2.6
Turnout		3,493	33.5	+7.4
Liberal Democrats hold		Swing	1.3% LD to Lab	

Nelson
Party	Candidate	Votes	%	±%
Liberal Democrats	Leo Madden	1,118	40.4	+4.6
Labour	Sue Castillon	617	22.3	−14.9
UKIP	Barry Davies	595	21.5	+21.5
Conservative	Ben Swann	438	15.8	−11.2
Majority		501	18.1	+16.7
Turnout		2,768	26.9	+3.4
Liberal Democrats gain from Labour		Swing	9.8% Lab to LD	

Paulsgrove
Party	Candidate	Votes	%	±%
Labour	John Ferrett*	995	41.3	−21.5
UKIP	Mike Jerome	711	29.5	+29.5
Conservative	Bill New	577	23.9	−4.6
Liberal Democrats	Nicky Dodd	99	4.1	−4.6
TUSC	Chris Pickett	30	1.2	+1.2
Majority		284	11.8	−22.5
Turnout		2,412	23.7	+1.9
Labour hold		Swing	25.5% Lab to UKIP	

St Jude
Party	Candidate	Votes	%	±%
Liberal Democrats	Hugh Mason*	1,264	39.7	−5.2
Conservative	Sandra Stockdale	863	27.1	−7.6
Labour	Tony Chafer	534	16.8	+1.0
UKIP	Christopher Vaughan	275	8.6	+8.6
Green	Ken Hawkins	249	7.8	+7.8
Majority		401	12.6	+2.4
Turnout		3,185	36.6	+6.6
Liberal Democrats hold		Swing	1.2% Con to LD	

St Thomas
Party	Candidate	Votes	%	±%
Liberal Democrats	Tom Wood	1,117	34.2	−13.3
Labour	Sumel Chowdhury	766	23.5	+8.8
Conservative	Christine Sykes	760	23.3	−9.9
UKIP	Jill Evans	367	11.3	+11.3
Green	Gail Baird	252	7.7	+7.7
Majority		351	10.7	−3.6
Turnout		3,262	34.6	+7.1
Liberal Democrats hold		Swing	11.1% LD to Lab	

Preceded by 2015 Portsmouth City Council election	Portsmouth City Council elections	Succeeded by 2018 Portsmouth City Council election
