= 2000 Portsmouth City Council election =

2000 UK local government election

Elections to Portsmouth City Council were held on 4 May 2000. One third of the council was up for election and the Labour Party lost overall control of the council to no overall control.

After the election, the composition of the council was:

- Conservative 16
- Labour 15
- Liberal Democrat 8

== Election result ==
Portsmouth local election result 2000
Party	Seats	Gains	Losses	Net gain/loss	Seats %	Votes %	Votes	+/−
Conservative	9			+6	64.3			
Liberal Democrats	3			-1	21.4			
Labour	2			-5	14.3			

Preceded by 1999 Portsmouth City Council election	Portsmouth City Council elections	Succeeded by 2002 Portsmouth City Council election
