= 1998 Portsmouth City Council election =

1998 UK local government election

Elections to Portsmouth City Council were held on 7 May 1998. One third of the council was up for election and the Labour party stayed in overall control of the council.

After the election, the composition of the council was

- Labour 21
- Liberal Democrat 10
- Conservative 8

== Election result ==
Portsmouth local election result 1998
Party	Seats	Gains	Losses	Net gain/loss	Seats %	Votes %	Votes	+/−
Labour	7			0	53.8			
Conservative	3			+2	23.1			
Liberal Democrats	3			-2	23.1			

Preceded by 1996 Portsmouth City Council election	Portsmouth City Council elections	Succeeded by 1999 Portsmouth City Council election
