= 2019 Portsmouth City Council election =

2019 UK local government election

← 2018	2 May 2019	2021 →

15 of the 42 seats to Portsmouth City Council 22 seats needed for a majority
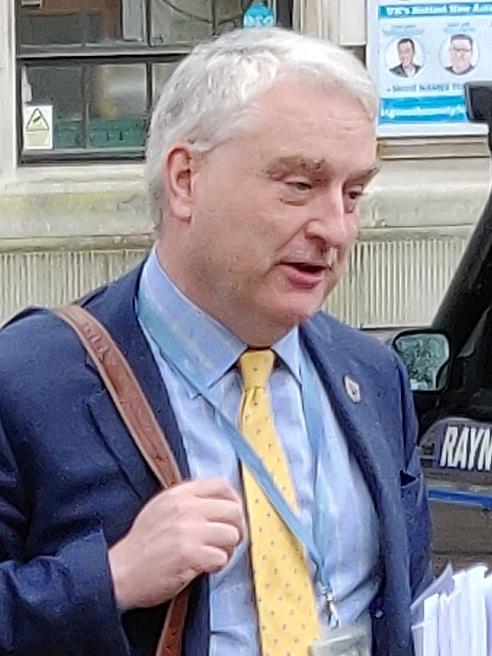

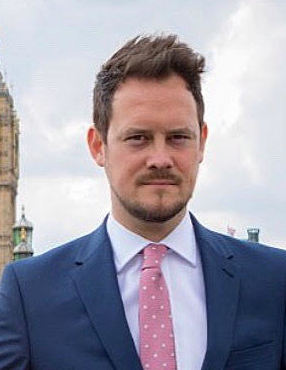
	First party	Second party	Third party
		Con
Leader	Gerald Vernon-Jackson	Donna Jones	Stephen Morgan
Party	Liberal Democrats	Conservative	Labour
Leader's seat	Milton	Hilsea	Charles Dickens
Last election	4 (2015)	9 (2015) +1	1 (2015)
Seats before	17	17	5
Seats won	6 (18 total)	7 (16 total)	2 (6 total)
Seat change	▲2	▼3	▲1
Popular vote	13,969	11,886	11,966
Percentage	29.2%	24.9%	25.0%
Swing	▲9.5%	▼9.4%	▲5.6%
Council control before election
No Overall Control
Council control after election
No Overall Control

Map showing the winner in each ward for the 2019 Portsmouth City Council election

Elections to Portsmouth City Council took place on Thursday 2 May 2019, alongside other local elections across the country. The seats contested in this election were last contested in 2015. The Conservative Party had 8 seats they were defending, the Liberal Democrats 5 and Labour 1 seat. A by-election occurred within the vacant Cosham seat from last years election, due to the sitting Conservative standing down. No party gained a majority from this election, and therefore the council remains under no overall control.

Following the election, the Liberal Democrat minority administration that was formed in 2018 continued in office. Labour abstained on the vote for the council leader, with the Liberal Democrats winning the vote by virtue of being the single largest party.

== Background ==
Elections to Portsmouth council since 2012 have proven to have volatile and changing results, with eleven of the city's fourteen wards voting for different parties each year. Following the 2018 election in Portsmouth, in which one third of the council was elected, the UK Independence Party lost all of their seats. Gerald Vernon-Jackson became leader of the council.

A Conservative councillor for Cosham who was elected, James Fleming, was forced to resign as he was not attending meetings due to long term sickness. This means that the Cosham ward will have two seats up for election. The Conservatives also faced an internal inquiry during this campaign due to one of their former candidates claiming he was racially abused.

== Election results ==
Immediately ahead of this election, the composition of the council was:

↓
17	5	17	2	1
Liberal Democrats	Labour	Conservative	I	V

After the election result, the composition of the council became:

↓
18	6	16	2
Liberal Democrats	Labour	Conservative	I

As the council is elected in thirds, one councillor for each of the 14 wards are elected each year for 3 years, with no election in the 4th year.. All comparisons in seats and swing are to the corresponding 2015 election.

2019 Portsmouth City Council election
Party	This election			Full council			This election		
Party	Seats	Net	Seats %	Other	Total	Total %	Votes	Votes %	+/−
Liberal Democrats	6	▲2	40.0	12	18	42.9	13,969	29.2	
Conservative	7	▼3	46.7	9	16	38.1	11,966	24.9	
Labour	2	▲1	13.3	4	6	14.3	11,966	25.1	
Independent	0	Steady	0.0	2	2	4.8	0	0.0	
UKIP	0	Steady	0.0	0	0	0.0	6,664	14.0	
Green	0	Steady	0.0	0	0	0.0	2,752	5.8	
NHA	0	Steady	0.0	0	0	0.0	344	0.7	
VPP	0	Steady	0.0	0	0	0.0	117	0.2	
JAC	0	Steady	0.0	0	0	0.0	75	0.2	

== Ward results ==
Comparisons for the purpose of determining a gain, hold or loss of a seat, and for all percentage changes, is to the last time these specific seats were up for election in 2015. An asterisk indicates the incumbent councillor.

=== Baffins ===
Baffins
Party	Candidate	Votes	%	±%
Liberal Democrats	Lynne Stagg*	1,649	45	+15
Conservative	Ryan Brent	776	21	−7
UKIP	Todd Sweeney	547	15	−7
Labour	Kasey Clark	470	13	−2
Green	Bob Simmonds	240	7	+2
Majority		873	24	+22
Turnout		3,682	33.1	−30.8
Liberal Democrats hold		Swing		

=== Central Southsea ===
Central Southsea
Party	Candidate	Votes	%	±%
Liberal Democrats	Suzy Horton*	1,760	46	+15
Labour	Charlotte Gerada	1,235	32	+16
Conservative	Ruben Bell	328	9	−13
Green	Eloise Shavelar	268	7	−14
UKIP	Michael Nawrot	263	7	−2
Majority		525	14	+5
Turnout		3,854	35.0	
Liberal Democrats hold		Swing		

=== Charles Dickens ===
Charles Dickens
Party	Candidate	Votes	%	±%
Labour	Cal Corkery	1,023	40	+14
Liberal Democrats	Mark Graham	619	24	−1
UKIP	Matthew Harvey	504	20	−2
Conservative	Ronnie Taffurelli-Hutchings	254	10	−8
Green	Sarah Gilbert	168	7	±0
Majority		404	16	+7
Turnout		2,568	21.5	−24.3
Labour hold		Swing	14	

=== Copnor ===
Copnor
Party	Candidate	Votes	%	±%
Conservative	Robert New*	1,064	37	−5
Labour	Rumal Khan	658	23	+1
UKIP	Bill Haley	541	19	−4
Liberal Democrats	Ross Campbell	365	13	+6
Green	Ken Hawkins	286	10	+5
Majority		406	14	+5
Turnout		2,914	29.8	
Conservative hold		Swing		

=== Cosham ===
Cosham
Party	Candidate	Votes	%	±%
Conservative	Lee Mason*	1,082	34	
Conservative	Matthew Atkins	1,071	34	
UKIP	George Madgwick	899	29	
Labour	David Boxall	756	24	
Labour	Yahiya Chowdhury	627	20	
Liberal Democrats	Simon Sansbury	427	14	
Liberal Democrats	Helena Cole	383	12	
NHA	Veronika Wagner	344	11	
Turnout		3,153	31.0	
Conservative hold		Swing		
Conservative hold		Swing		

=== Drayton & Farlington ===
Drayton & Farlington
Party	Candidate	Votes	%	±%
Conservative	Terry Norton	1,927	55	−11
Labour	Rebecca Light	729	21	+3
UKIP	Derek Jennings	471	13	N/A
Liberal Democrats	Delwar Baig	402	11	+6
Majority		1,198	34	−14
Turnout		3,529	30.1	
Conservative hold		Swing		

=== Eastney and Craneswater ===
Eastney and Craneswater
Party	Candidate	Votes	%	±%
Conservative	Linda Symes	1,406	34.9	−5.1
Liberal Democrats	Jennie Brent*	1,003	24.9	+1.9
Labour	Luke Evans	910	22.6	+10.6
UKIP	Andrew Walters	365	9.1	−4.9
Green	Menno Groen	282	7.0	+3.0
JAC	Steve Oldfield	53	1.3	
Majority		403	10.0	−4.3
Turnout		4,019	41.9	−22.3
Conservative hold		Swing		

=== Fratton ===
Fratton
Party	Candidate	Votes	%	±%
Liberal Democrats	Dave Ashmore*	1,141	39	+13
Labour	Trevor Morgan	844	29	+9
UKIP	Kevan Chippindall-Higgin	395	13	−8
Green	Tim Sheerman-Chase	289	10	+3
Conservative	Elliot Russell	288	10	−12
Majority		297	10	+5
Turnout		2,957	28	
Liberal Democrats hold		Swing		

=== Hilsea ===
Hilsea
Party	Candidate	Votes	%	±%
Conservative	Scott Harris*	1,058	39	−6
Labour	Sue Castillon	627	22	−2
UKIP	Mark Roberts	518	18	−2
Liberal Democrats	Peter Williams	380	13	+6
Green	Emma Murphy	274	10	+5
Majority		431	17	−2
Turnout		2,857		
Conservative hold		Swing		

=== Milton ===
Milton
Party	Candidate	Votes	%	±%
Liberal Democrats	Gerald Vernon-Jackson*	1,611	41	+7
Labour	Paula Savage	1,036	26	+12
UKIP	Jenny Dobson	543	14	−1
Conservative	Stephen Gorys	457	12	−13
Green	Tamara Groen	276	7	−4
Majority		575	15	+6
Turnout		3,923		
Liberal Democrats hold		Swing		

=== Nelson ===
Nelson
Party	Candidate	Votes	%	±%
Liberal Democrats	Lee Hunt	1,125	43	+21
Labour	Mo Quinn	472	18	−5
UKIP	Mike Jerome	456	18	−6
Conservative	Lewis Gosling	374	14	−11
Green	Duncan Robinson	176	7	+3
Majority		653	25	
Turnout		2,603		
Liberal Democrats gain from Conservative		Swing		

=== Paulsgrove ===
Paulsgrove
Party	Candidate	Votes	%	±%
Conservative	Gemma New*	966	37	+4
Labour	Isabelle Sene	669	26	−6
UKIP	Stuart Potter	647	25	−1
Liberal Democrats	Iain Sutherland	209	8	+3
Green	Robert Wilson	117	4	±0
Majority		297	11	+10
Turnout		2,608		
Conservative hold		Swing		

=== St Jude ===
St Jude
Party	Candidate	Votes	%	±%
Labour	Graham Heaney	1,061	33	+18
Liberal Democrats	Tracy McClure	851	26	−1
Conservative	Timothy Forer	766	24	−10
Green	Darren Fry	310	10	−2
UKIP	Ian Ducane	245	8	−2
The Justice & Anti-Corruption Party	Claudiu-Bogdan Babii	22	1	N/A
Majority		210	7	−1
Turnout		3,255		
Labour gain from Conservative		Swing	14	

=== St Thomas ===
St Thomas
Party	Candidate	Votes	%	±%
Liberal Democrats	Chris Attwell	1,366	40	+13
Labour	Sumel Chowdhury	849	25	+9
Conservative	Terry Henderson	747	22	−10
UKIP	Colin Galloway	270	8	−4
Green	Rebecca Kingsley-Smith	183	5	−7
Majority		517	15	+10
Turnout		3,415		
Liberal Democrats gain from Conservative		Swing		
