= 2011 Portsmouth City Council election =

2011 UK local government election

Map of the results of the 2011 Portsmouth council election. Liberal Democrats in orange, Conservatives in blue and Labour in red.

The 2011 Portsmouth City Council election took place on Thursday 5 May 2011 to elect members of Portsmouth City Council in Hampshire, England. The election took place on the same day as a referendum on the parliamentary voting system, and one third of the council (14 seats) was up for election using the first-past-the-post voting system. The Liberal Democrats won a majority of the seats being contested, and remained in overall control of the council.

After the election, the composition of the council was:

- Liberal Democrats: 23
- Conservatives: 17
- Labour: 2

== Election result ==
The only seats to change hands were Central Southsea and Nelson, both of which saw councillors who had previously defected to the Liberal Democrats from the Conservatives and Labour respectively retain their seats under the Liberal Democrat label. All comparisons are to the 2007 local elections, at which the same tranche of seats were contested.

Portsmouth local election result 2011
Party	Seats	Gains	Losses	Net gain/loss	Seats %	Votes %	Votes	+/−
Liberal Democrats	9	2	0	+2	64.3	32.9	16,850	-1.0%
Conservative	4	0	1	-1	28.6	37.2	19,042	-3.4%
Labour	1	0	1	-1	7.1	25.9	13,285	+10.0%
English Democrat	0	0	0	0	0	1.9	986	-4.0%
Green	0	0	0	0	0	0.9	486	-1.6%
TUSC	0	0	0	0	0	0.8	411	+0.8%
Independent	0	0	0	0	0	0.3	149	-0.4%

== Ward results ==
Comparisons for the purpose of determining a gain, hold or loss of a seat, and for all percentage changes, is to the last time these specific seats were up for election in 2007.

Baffins
Party	Candidate	Votes	%	±%
Liberal Democrats	Lynne Stagg	1,824	41.5	−4.0
Conservative	Daryn Brewer	1,251	28.5	−5.9
Labour	Julian Wright	683	15.6	+6.0
English Democrat	Ian Ducane	243	5.5	+0.2
Green	Sarah Coote	216	4.9	−0.3
Independent	David Tucker	149	3.4	+3.4
Majority		573	13.0	+0.9
Turnout		4,391	39.2	+5.5
Liberal Democrats hold		Swing	1.0% Con to LD	

Central Southsea
Party	Candidate	Votes	%	±%
Liberal Democrats	Margaret Adair	1,626	42.4	+13.0
Labour	Rob Smith	1,059	27.6	+14.3
Conservative	Massoud Esmaili	877	22.9	−14.7
TUSC	Frances Pilling	234	6.1	+6.1
Majority		567	14.8	+14.8
Turnout		3,838	34.4	+0.3
Liberal Democrats gain from Conservative		Swing	0.7% LD to Lab	

Charles Dickens
Party	Candidate	Votes	%	±%
Liberal Democrats	Steven Wylie	1,082	35.9	−4.0
Labour	Sarah Cook	958	31.8	+9.7
Conservative	Matt Davies	670	22.3	+4.7
Green	Russell Anderson	270	9.0	+3.6
Majority		124	4.1	−13.7
Turnout		3,011	25.0	+0.1
Liberal Democrats hold		Swing	6.9% LD to Lab	

Copnor
Party	Candidate	Votes	%	±%
Conservative	Robert New	1,402	38.0	−8.3
Liberal Democrats	Stephen Fletcher	1,094	29.7	+12.2
Labour	Simon Payne	864	23.4	+4.5
English Democrat	David Knight	302	8.2	−9.1
Majority		308	8.3	−19.1
Turnout		3,689	36.5	+8.2
Conservative hold		Swing	10.3% Con to LD	

Cosham
Party	Candidate	Votes	%	±%
Conservative	Lee Mason	1,723	47.5	−1.5
Labour	Graham Heaney	1,259	34.7	+10.8
Liberal Democrats	Steve Pearson	620	17.1	+0.5
Majority		464	12.8	−12.3
Turnout		3,625	36.2	+6.4
Conservative hold		Swing	6.2% Con to Lab	

Drayton and Farlington
Party	Candidate	Votes	%	±%
Conservative	Ken Ellcome	3,074	63.2	+3.8
Labour	Paul Middleton	925	19.0	+9.4
Liberal Democrats	Steve Lanson-Dale	555	11.4	−11.4
English Democrat	Dave Ward	253	5.2	−3.0
Majority		2,149	44.2	+7.6
Turnout		4,865	47.7	+6.0
Conservative hold		Swing	2.8% Con to Lab	

Eastney and Craneswater
Party	Candidate	Votes	%	±%
Liberal Democrats	Terry Hall	1,842	45.7	−9.1
Conservative	Gerry Oldfield	1,369	33.9	−4.6
Labour	Rosalie Ward	603	14.9	+8.3
English Democrat	Peter Lawrence	188	4.7	+4.7
Majority		473	11.8	−4.5
Turnout		4,034	41.8	+3.7
Liberal Democrats hold		Swing	2.3% LD to Con	

Fratton
Party	Candidate	Votes	%	±%
Liberal Democrats	Eleanor Scott	1,367	45.8	−10.2
Labour	John Attrill	715	23.9	+11.4
Conservative	Terry Judkins	710	23.8	+0.8
TUSC	John Pickett	177	5.9	+5.9
Majority		652	21.9	−11.1
Turnout		2,986	27.9	+2.5
Liberal Democrats hold		Swing	10.8 LD to Lab	

Hilsea
Party	Candidate	Votes	%	±%
Conservative	Alistair Thompson	1,990	55.2	−2.8
Labour	Michelle Treacher	1,196	33.2	+11.2
Liberal Democrats	Michelle Cole	393	10.9	0.0
Majority		794	22.0	−14.0
Turnout		3,606	35.0	+4.7
Conservative hold		Swing	7.0% Con to Lab	

Milton
Party	Candidate	Votes	%	±%
Liberal Democrats	Gerald Vernon-Jackson	1,821	45.9	+2.6
Conservative	Chris Hirst	1,267	31.9	−10.5
Labour	Ken Ferrett	851	21.4	+15.3
Majority		554	14.0	+13.1
Turnout		3,969	38.3	−1.9
Liberal Democrats hold		Swing	6.6% Con to LD	

Nelson
Party	Candidate	Votes	%	±%
Liberal Democrats	Leo Madden	1,240	38.2	+11.0
Labour	John Ferrett	1,091	33.6	+1.7
Conservative	Audrey Arnell	895	27.6	+0.6
Majority		149	4.6	+4.6
Turnout		3,248	31.5	+5.2
Liberal Democrats gain from Labour		Swing	4.7% Lab to LD	

Paulsgrove
Party	Candidate	Votes	%	±%
Labour	David Horne	1,624	55.0	+8.3
Conservative	Oliver Greenwood	980	33.2	+1.7
Liberal Democrats	Will Purvis	334	11.3	+1.8
Majority		644	21.8	+6.6
Turnout		2,952	29.6	+4.6
Labour hold		Swing	3.3% Con to Lab	

St Jude
Party	Candidate	Votes	%	±%
Liberal Democrats	Michael Andrewes	1,464	41.9	−5.1
Conservative	Linda Symes	1,329	38.1	−5.9
Labour	Craig Cameron	664	19.0	+10.0
Majority		135	3.8	+0.8
Turnout		3,492	38.5	+5.5
Liberal Democrats hold		Swing	0.4% Con to LD	

St Thomas
Party	Candidate	Votes	%	±%
Liberal Democrats	Les Stevens	1,588	40.2	−7.4
Conservative	Sandra Stockdale	1,505	38.1	−5.7
Labour	John Lancaster	793	20.1	+11.5
Majority		83	2.1	−1.7
Turnout		3,950	35.3	+0.5
Liberal Democrats hold		Swing	0.9% LD to Con	

Preceded by 2010 Portsmouth City Council election	Portsmouth City Council elections	Succeeded by 2012 Portsmouth City Council election
