= 2010 Portsmouth City Council election =

2010 UK local government election

Map of the results of the 2010 Portsmouth council election. Liberal Democrats in orange, Conservatives in blue and Labour in red.

The 2010 Portsmouth City Council election took place on Thursday 6 May 2010 to elect members of Portsmouth City Council in Hampshire, England. The election took place on the same day as a parliamentary general election, and one third of the council (14 seats) was up for election using the first-past-the-post voting system. The Liberal Democrats won a majority of the seats being contested, and remained in overall control of the council, which they had achieved following a series of defections to the party in 2009.

After the election, the composition of the council was:

- Liberal Democrats: 24
- Conservatives: 16
- Labour: 2

== Election result ==
NB: All comparisons are to the 2006 local elections, at which the same tranche of seats were contested.

Portsmouth local election result 2010
Party	Seats	Gains	Losses	Net gain/loss	Seats %	Votes %	Votes	+/−
Liberal Democrats	8	3	0	+3	57.1	38.5	32,874	+4.9
Conservative	5	0	2	-2	35.7	36.8	31,469	-5.5
Labour	1	0	1	-1	7.1	19.4	16,578	+1.3
English Democrat	0	0	0	0	0	3.6	3,038	+2.6
Green	0	0	0	0	0	1.2	1,019	-2.0
Independent	0	0	0	0	0	0.6	508	-0.7

== Ward results ==
NB: All comparisons are to the 2006 local elections, at which the same tranche of seats were contested.

Baffins
Party	Candidate	Votes	%	±%
Liberal Democrats	Darron Phillips	3,294	45.9	+0.3
Conservative	Richard Smith	2,185	30.5	−4.3
Labour	Barbara Spiegelhalter	1,070	14.9	+2.7
English Democrat	Piers Goodwin	354	4.9	+4.9
Green	Sarah Coote	234	3.3	−4.1
Majority		1,109	15.4	+4.6
Turnout		7,169	65.6	+30.3
Liberal Democrats hold		Swing	2.0% Con to LD	

Central Southsea
Party	Candidate	Votes	%	±%
Liberal Democrats	Lee Hunt	3,374	49.5	+13.8
Conservative	Joan Payne	1,732	25.4	−14.1
Labour	Keith Crabbe	974	14.3	+1.4
Green	Lucy Maclennan	457	6.7	−5.1
Independent	Derek Wareham	216	3.2	+3.2
Majority		1,642	24.1	+24.1
Turnout		6,814	61.1	+24.7
Liberal Democrats gain from Conservative		Swing	14.0% Con to LD	

Charles Dickens
Party	Candidate	Votes	%	±%
Liberal Democrats	Jacqui Hancock	2,655	50.9	+0.9
Labour	John Ferrett	1,112	21.3	−1.5
Conservative	Syed Haque	1,105	21.2	+2.5
Independent	Leslie Cummings	292	5.6	+5.6
Majority		1,543	29.6	+2.4
Turnout		5,219	44.7	+18.3
Liberal Democrats hold		Swing	1.2% Lab to LD	

Copnor
Party	Candidate	Votes	%	±%
Conservative	Michael Park	2,729	42.3	−4.1
Liberal Democrats	Stephen Fletcher	1,746	27.1	+10.1
Labour	Michelle Treacher	1,462	22.7	+4.1
English Democrat	David Knight	446	6.9	−6.8
Majority		983	15.2	−12.6
Turnout		6,451	64.5	+32.0
Conservative hold		Swing	7.1% Con to LD	

Cosham
Party	Candidate	Votes	%	±%
Conservative	April Windebank	2,679	43.5	−11.0
Labour	Graham Heaney	1,753	28.5	+3.8
Liberal Democrats	Neil Munday	1,291	21.0	+0.2
English Democrat	David Ward	378	6.1	+6.1
Majority		926	15.0	−14.8
Turnout		6,159	62.4	+28.6
Conservative hold		Swing	7.4% Con to Lab	

Drayton and Farlington
Party	Candidate	Votes	%	±%
Conservative	Simon Bosher	4,247	56.8	−4.5
Liberal Democrats	Steve Pearson	1,650	22.1	−6.5
Labour	Andy Silvester	1,229	16.5	+6.4
English Democrat	Greg Trechard	306	4.1	+4.1
Majority		2,597	34.7	+2.0
Turnout		7,471	73.2	+29.3
Conservative hold		Swing	1.0% LD to Con	

Eastney and Craneswater
Party	Candidate	Votes	%	±%
Conservative	Luke Stubbs	2,704	43.7	−2.5
Liberal Democrats	Matthew Winnington	2,542	41.1	−4.6
Labour	Vicky Davies	663	10.7	+2.5
English Democrat	Peter Lawrence	242	3.9	+3.9
Majority		162	2.6	+2.1
Turnout		6,182	66.2	+28.6
Conservative hold		Swing	1.1% LD to Con	

Fratton
Party	Candidate	Votes	%	±%
Liberal Democrats	Mike Hancock	3,301	58.7	−0.9
Conservative	Terry Judkins	1,523	27.1	−0.8
Labour	Nick Durrant	775	13.8	+1.5
Majority		1,778	31.6	−0.3
Turnout		5,627	54.6	+27.8
Liberal Democrats hold		Swing	0.1% LD to Con	

Hilsea
Party	Candidate	Votes	%	±%
Conservative	Frank Jonas	3,095	49.3	−11.5
Labour	Margaret Gooch	1,645	26.2	−0.2
Liberal Democrats	Chasta Cole	1,191	19.0	+6.2
English Democrat	Barry Faust	304	4.8	+4.8
Majority		1,450	23.1	−11.3
Turnout		6,273	62.3	+27.8
Conservative hold		Swing	5.7% Con to Lab	

Milton
Party	Candidate	Votes	%	±%
Liberal Democrats	Caroline Scott	3,238	49.5	+8.2
Conservative	Stephen Rogers	1,988	30.4	−9.1
Labour	Ken Ferrett	903	13.8	+4.6
English Democrat	Ian Ducane	332	5.1	+5.1
Majority		1,250	19.1	+17.3
Turnout		6,541	63.7	+28.0
Liberal Democrats hold		Swing	8.7% Con to LD	

Nelson
Party	Candidate	Votes	%	±%
Liberal Democrats	Jason Fazackarley	2,228	40.3	+20.5
Labour	Sarah Cook	1,478	26.7	−12.6
Conservative	Ian Lyon	1,477	26.7	−4.2
English Democrat	Kevin Baker	308	5.6	+5.6
Majority		750	13.6	+13.6
Turnout		5,529	55.0	+27.9
Liberal Democrats gain from Labour		Swing	16.6% Lab to LD	

Paulsgrove
Party	Candidate	Votes	%	±%
Labour	Jim Patey	2,134	40.1	−9.6
Conservative	Fred Brimecome	1,904	35.7	+1.4
Liberal Democrats	Alan Webb	880	16.5	+0.6
English Democrat	Peter Fletcher	368	6.9	+6.9
Majority		230	4.4	−11.0
Turnout		5,327	54.3	+26.5
Labour hold		Swing	5.5% Lab to Con	

St Jude
Party	Candidate	Votes	%	±%
Liberal Democrats	Peter Eddis	2,485	46.8	+11.0
Conservative	Linda Symes	1,852	34.9	−3.9
Labour	Alwin Oliver	611	11.5	+5.6
Green	Sean Sanders	328	6.2	+6.2
Majority		633	11.9	+11.9
Turnout		5,313	60.4	+26.8
Liberal Democrats gain from Conservative		Swing	7.5% Con to LD	

St Thomas
Party	Candidate	Votes	%	±%
Liberal Democrats	Rob Wood	2,999	49.2	+4.6
Conservative	Sandra Stockdale	2,249	36.9	−4.6
Labour	John Spiegelhalter	769	12.6	−1.4
Majority		750	12.3	+9.2
Turnout		6,097	56.9	+21.1
Liberal Democrats hold		Swing	4.6% Con to LD	

Preceded by 2008 Portsmouth City Council election	Portsmouth City Council elections	Succeeded by 2011 Portsmouth City Council election
