= 2012 Portsmouth City Council election =

2012 UK local government election

Map of the results of the 2012 Portsmouth council election. Liberal Democrats in orange, Conservatives in blue and Labour in red.

The 2012 Portsmouth City Council elections took place on Thursday 3 May 2012 to elect members of Portsmouth City Council in Hampshire, England. One third of the council (14 seats) was contested using the first-past-the-post voting system. The ruling Liberal Democrats won a majority of the seats being contested, and remained in overall control of the council.

After the election, the composition of the council was:

- Liberal Democrats: 26
- Conservatives: 12
- Labour: 4

== Election result ==
All comparisons are to the 2008 local elections, at which the same tranche of seats were last elected.

Portsmouth local election result 2012
Party	Seats	Gains	Losses	Net gain/loss	Seats %	Votes %	Votes	+/−
Liberal Democrats	9	3	0	+3	64.3	36.1	13,956	+0.8
Conservative	3	0	5	-5	21.4	30.7	11,892	-13.6
Labour	2	2	0	+2	14.3	27.1	10,495	+13.9
TUSC	0	0	0	0	0.0	2.8	1,093	+2.8
Green	0	0	0	0	0.0	2.0	782	+0.8
Independent	0	0	0	0	0.0	1.3	487	0.0

== Ward results ==
Comparisons for the purpose of determining a gain, hold or loss of a seat, and for all percentage changes, is to the last time these specific seats were up for election in 2008.

Baffins
Party	Candidate	Votes	%	±%
Liberal Democrats	Darren Sanders	1,518	48.3	+7.6
Conservative	Jonathan Kemp	720	22.9	−18.3
Labour	Barbara Spiegelhalter	560	17.8	+9.7
Green	Sarah Coote	344	10.9	+6.4
Majority		798	25.4	
Turnout		3,142	27.9	−6.8
Liberal Democrats gain from Conservative		Swing	13.0% Con to LD	

Central Southsea
Party	Candidate	Votes	%	±%
Liberal Democrats	Phil Smith	1,192	42.4	+1.5
Labour	Rob Smith	722	25.7	+15.9
Conservative	Kevan Chippindall-Higgin	476	16.9	−15.4
Green	Lucy MacLennan	270	9.6	+1.6
TUSC	Frances Pilling	151	5.4	+5.4
Majority		470	16.7	+8.1
Turnout		2,811	23.3	−9.7
Liberal Democrats hold		Swing	7.2% LD to Lab	

Charles Dickens
Party	Candidate	Votes	%	±%
Liberal Democrats	Margaret Foster	1,135	46.1	+1.1
Labour	Sarah Cook	782	31.7	+13.4
Conservative	Luke Franks	282	11.4	−9.9
Green	Russell Anderson	168	6.8	+6.8
TUSC	Aron Fielder	96	3.9	+3.9
Majority		353	14.4	−9.3
Turnout		2,463	21.2	−2.4
Liberal Democrats hold		Swing	6.2% LD to Lab	

Copnor
Party	Candidate	Votes	%	±%
Conservative	Neill Young	828	32.3	−15.3
Labour	John Spiegelhalter	576	22.5	+10.7
Liberal Democrats	Alex Bentley	539	21.0	−9.7
Independent	Malcolm Hey	487	19.0	+19.0
TUSC	Mick Tosh	131	5.1	+5.1
Majority		252	9.8	−7.1
Turnout		2,561	25.5	−5.3
Conservative hold		Swing	13.0% Con to Lab	

Cosham
Party	Candidate	Votes	%	±%
Liberal Democrats	Aiden Grey	1,019	33.3	+21.2
Labour	Graham Heaney	976	31.9	+10.6
Conservative	Jim Fleming	924	30.2	−25.9
TUSC	Simon Wade	141	4.6	+4.6
Majority		43	1.4	
Turnout		3,060	29.9	−1.6
Liberal Democrats gain from Conservative		Swing	23.6% Con to LD	

Drayton and Farlington
Party	Candidate	Votes	%	±%
Conservative	Steve Wemyss	2,110	60.0	−0.1
Labour	Terry King	885	25.1	+18.0
Liberal Democrats	Suzy Horton	524	14.9	−11.6
Majority		1,225	34.9	+1.3
Turnout		3,519	34.6	−7.9
Conservative hold		Swing	14.8% LD to Lab	

Eastney and Craneswater
Party	Candidate	Votes	%	±%
Liberal Democrats	Matthew Winnington	1,400	45.3	−1.4
Conservative	Terry Henderson	1,080	35.0	−11.3
Labour	Rosalie Ward	474	15.3	+8.6
TUSC	Ben Norman	136	4.4	+4.4
Majority		320	10.3	+9.9
Turnout		3,090	32.3	−4.1
Liberal Democrats hold		Swing	5.0% Con to LD	

Fratton
Party	Candidate	Votes	%	±%
Liberal Democrats	David Fuller	1,091	49.6	−6.0
Labour	Geoff Wade	558	25.4	+16.1
Conservative	Perry Taylor	376	17.1	−9.3
TUSC	John Pickett	173	7.9	+7.9
Majority		533	24.2	−5.3
Turnout		2,198	20.3	−4.5
Liberal Democrats hold		Swing	11.1% LD to Lab	

Hilsea
Party	Candidate	Votes	%	±%
Conservative	Donna Jones	1,207	44.4	−16.3
Labour	Sue Castillon	1,133	41.7	+22.8
Liberal Democrats	Simon Dodd	379	13.9	+1.9
Majority		74	2.7	−39.1
Turnout		2,719	26.3	−4.1
Conservative hold		Swing	19.6% Con to Lab	

Milton
Party	Candidate	Votes	%	±%
Liberal Democrats	Will Purvis	1,402	52.1	+10.3
Labour	Michelle Treacher	658	24.5	+18.9
Conservative	Joan Payne	631	23.4	−24.7
Majority		744	27.6	
Turnout		2,691	26.1	−13.8
Liberal Democrats gain from Conservative		Swing	17.5% Con to LD	

Nelson
Party	Candidate	Votes	%	±%
Labour	Ken Ferrett	920	37.2	+8.8
Liberal Democrats	Ben French	886	35.8	+6.7
Conservative	James Williams	668	27.0	−4.3
Majority		34	1.4	
Turnout		2,474	23.5	−3.7
Labour gain from Conservative		Swing	6.6% Con to Lab	

Paulsgrove
Party	Candidate	Votes	%	±%
Labour	John Ferrett	1,370	62.8	+23.5
Conservative	Matt Davies	622	28.5	−31.7
Liberal Democrats	Roger Inkpen	191	8.7	−1.5
Majority		748	34.3	
Turnout		2,183	21.8	−3.7
Labour gain from Conservative		Swing	27.6% Con to Lab	

St Jude
Party	Candidate	Votes	%	±%
Liberal Democrats	Hugh Mason	1,247	44.9	−1.7
Conservative	David Tompkins	966	34.7	−7.8
Labour	Julian Wright	439	15.8	+9.0
TUSC	Andy Waterman	128	4.6	+4.6
Majority		281	10.2	+6.1
Turnout		2,780	29.9	−3.2
Liberal Democrats hold		Swing	3.1% Con to LD	

St Thomas
Party	Candidate	Votes	%	±%
Liberal Democrats	Sandra Stockdale	1,433	47.5	+1.4
Conservative	Angus Ross	1,002	33.2	−12.0
Labour	Taj Uddin	442	14.7	+6.6
TUSC	Billy Perry	137	4.5	+4.5
Majority		431	14.3	+13.4
Turnout		3,014	27.5	−5.2
Liberal Democrats hold		Swing	6.7% Con to LD	

Preceded by 2011 Portsmouth City Council election	Portsmouth City Council elections	Succeeded by 2014 Portsmouth City Council election
