= 2008 Portsmouth City Council election =

2008 UK local government election

Results by ward

The 2008 Portsmouth City Council election took place on Thursday 1 May 2008 to elect members of Portsmouth City Council in Hampshire, England. One third of the council (14 seats) was up for election using the first-past-the-post voting system. The Conservatives won a majority of the seats being contested, while the council remained in no overall control.

After the election, the composition of the council was:

- Conservatives: 19
- Liberal Democrats: 19
- Labour: 2
- Independent: 2

== Election result ==
NB: All comparisons are to the 2004 local elections, at which the same tranche of seats were contested.

Portsmouth local election result 2008
Party	Seats	Gains	Losses	Net gain/loss	Seats %	Votes %	Votes	+/−
Conservative	8	3	0	+3	57.1	44.3	19,182	+6.3
Liberal Democrats	6	0	2	-2	42.9	35.3	15,294	-4.0
Labour	0	0	1	-1	0.0	13.2	5,726	-7.5
English Democrat	0	0	0	0	0.0	4.2	1,821	+4.2
Independent	0	0	0	0	0.0	1.3	551	+1.3
Green	0	0	0	0	0.0	1.2	507	-0.1
UKIP	0	0	0	0	0.0	0.4	175	+0.4
Senate Party	0	0	0	0	0.0	0.1	57	+0.1

== Ward results ==
NB: All comparisons are to the 2004 local elections, at which the same tranche of seats were contested.

Baffins
Party	Candidate	Votes	%	±%
Conservative	Jim Fleming	1,494	41.2	+8.4
Liberal Democrats	Michael Andrewes	1,463	40.7	−5.9
Labour	Victoria Fry	293	8.1	−3.7
English Democrat	Alan Wakeford	205	5.7	+5.7
Green	Sarah Coote	156	4.5	−4.3
Majority		31	0.5	
Turnout		3,625	34.7	−2.3
Conservative gain from Liberal Democrats		Swing	7.2% LD to Con	

Central Southsea
Party	Candidate	Votes	%	±%
Liberal Democrats	John Ireland	1,296	40.9	+1.9
Conservative	Massoud Esmaili	1,024	32.3	−2.6
Labour	John Ferrett	313	9.8	−16.3
Green	Betty Burns	247	7.8	+7.8
Independent	John Molyneux	159	5.0	+5.0
Independent	Alan Evens	113	3.6	+3.6
Majority		272	8.6	+4.5
Turnout		3,167	33.0	−6.5
Liberal Democrats hold		Swing	2.3% Con to LD	

Charles Dickens
Party	Candidate	Votes	%	±%
Liberal Democrats	Margaret Foster	1,046	45.0	−7.4
Conservative	Stephen Rogers	496	21.3	+4.4
Labour	Keith Crabbe	426	18.3	−12.4
English Democrat	David Farley	182	7.8	+7.8
Independent	Lee Sprake	172	7.4	+7.4
Majority		550	23.7	+2.0
Turnout		2,327	23.6	−3.6
Liberal Democrats hold		Swing	5.9% LD to Con	

Copnor
Party	Candidate	Votes	%	±%
Conservative	Malcolm Hey	1,434	47.6	−1.8
Liberal Democrats	Phil Smith	923	30.7	+2.2
Labour	Terence O'Brien	355	11.8	−10.3
English Democrat	David Knight	294	9.8	+9.8
Majority		511	16.9	−4.0
Turnout		3,011	30.8	−1.1
Conservative hold		Swing	2.0% Con to LD	

Cosham
Party	Candidate	Votes	%	±%
Conservative	Terence Henderson	1,749	56.1	+12.0
Labour	Andrew Silvester	657	21.3	−13.2
Liberal Democrats	Alan Webb	371	12.1	−9.4
English Democrat	David Ward	241	7.8	+7.8
Senate Party	Stephen Holland	57	1.9	+1.9
Majority		1,092	34.8	+25.2
Turnout		3,079	31.5	−5.6
Conservative hold		Swing	12.6% Lab to Con	

Drayton and Farlington
Party	Candidate	Votes	%	±%
Conservative	Steve Wemyss	2,532	60.1	+13.4
Liberal Democrats	Patrick Whittle	1,115	26.5	−15.9
Labour	Peter Lipscombe	297	7.1	−3.9
English Democrat	Clive Percy	258	6.1	+6.1
Majority		1,417	33.6	+29.3
Turnout		4,213	42.5	−5.5
Conservative hold		Swing	14.7% LD to Con	

Eastney and Craneswater
Party	Candidate	Votes	%	±%
Liberal Democrats	Cheryl Buggy	1,559	46.7	+1.1
Conservative	Gerry Oldfield	1,545	46.3	+8.5
Labour	Geoff Wade	220	6.7	−2.6
Majority		14	0.4	−7.4
Turnout		3,337	36.4	−3.6
Liberal Democrats hold		Swing	3.7% LD to Con	

Fratton
Party	Candidate	Votes	%	±%
Liberal Democrats	David Fuller	1,326	55.6	+2.5
Conservative	Angus Ross	623	26.4	+4.6
Labour	Simon Bramwell	221	9.3	−5.4
English Democrat	Piers Goodwin	205	8.6	+8.6
Majority		703	29.5	−1.8
Turnout		2,383	24.8	−4.5
Liberal Democrats hold		Swing	1.1% LD to Con	

Hilsea
Party	Candidate	Votes	%	±%
Conservative	Donna Jones	1,804	60.7	+9.4
Labour	Michelle Treacher	562	18.9	−7.4
Liberal Democrats	Fred Holliday	357	12.0	−10.3
English Democrat	Matthew Clark	243	8.2	+8.2
Majority		1,242	41.8	+8.7
Turnout		2,973	30.4	−2.7
Conservative hold		Swing	8.4% Lab to Con	

Milton
Party	Candidate	Votes	%	±%
Conservative	Sarah Dinenage	1,835	48.1	+17.2
Liberal Democrats	Alexander Bentley	1,584	41.8	−11.0
Labour	Ken Ferrett	215	5.6	−10.7
UKIP	Robbie Robinson	175	4.6	+4.6
Majority		251	6.3	
Turnout		3,819	39.9	+3.1
Conservative gain from Liberal Democrats		Swing	14.1% LD to Con	

Nelson
Party	Candidate	Votes	%	±%
Conservative	James Williams	844	31.3	−2.7
Liberal Democrats	Paul Miles-Knight	785	29.1	+3.0
Labour	Sarah Cook	766	28.4	−11.5
English Democrat	Kevin Baker	193	7.2	+7.2
Green	Calum Kennedy	104	3.9	+3.9
Majority		59	2.2	
Turnout		2,694	27.2	−0.6
Conservative gain from Labour		Swing	4.4% Lab to Con	

Paulsgrove
Party	Candidate	Votes	%	±%
Conservative	Mike Blake	1,236	50.2	+9.9
Labour	Graham Heaney	963	39.3	−0.7
Liberal Democrats	Matthew Winnington	251	10.2	−9.5
Majority		273	11.1	+10.8
Turnout		2,461	25.5	−0.8
Conservative hold		Swing	5.3% Lab to Con	

St Jude
Party	Candidate	Votes	%	±%
Liberal Democrats	Hugh Mason	1,265	46.6	−3.3
Conservative	Terry Judkins	1,153	42.5	+2.9
Labour	Alwin Oliver	184	6.8	−3.7
Independent	Mark Austin	107	3.9	+3.9
Majority		112	4.1	−6.2
Turnout		2,714	33.1	−2.4
Liberal Democrats hold		Swing	3.1% LD to Con	

St Thomas
Party	Candidate	Votes	%	±%
Liberal Democrats	Paula Riches	1,442	46.1	−0.2
Conservative	Sandra Stockdale	1,413	45.2	+2.6
Labour	John Spiegelhalter	254	8.1	−3.0
Majority		29	0.9	−2.8
Turnout		3,128	32.7	−6.9
Liberal Democrats hold		Swing	1.2% LD to Con	

Preceded by 2007 Portsmouth City Council election	Portsmouth City Council elections	Succeeded by 2010 Portsmouth City Council election
