= 2002 Portsmouth City Council election =

2002 UK local government election

- 2 May 2002

All 42 seats to Portsmouth City Council 22 seats needed for a majority
	First party	Second party	Third party
Party	Conservative	Labour	Liberal Democrats
Seats won	15	14	13
Popular vote	45,765	38,011	36,208
- Results by Ward
Council control before election
No overall control
Council control after election
No overall control

Elections to Portsmouth City Council were held on 2 May 2002. The whole council was up for election with boundary changes since the last election in 2000 increasing the number of seats by 3. The council stayed under no overall control, with the Conservatives as the largest party with 15 seats.

== Election result ==
Portsmouth local election result 2002
Party	Seats	Gains	Losses	Net gain/loss	Seats %	Votes %	Votes	+/−
Conservative	15			-1	35.71	37.57	45,765	
Labour	14			-1	33.33	31.21	38,011	
Liberal Democrats	13			+5	30.95	29.73	36,208	
Green	0			0	0	0.74	907	
Socialist Alliance	0			0	0	0.40	498	
Independent	0			0	0	0.32	397	

== Ward results ==
=== Baffins ===
Baffins (3)
Party	Candidate	Votes	%	±%
Liberal Democrats	Nicola Bentley	1,667	41.08	
Liberal Democrats	Michael Andrewes	1,507		
Liberal Democrats	Geoffrey Goble	1,433		
Conservative	David Banks	1,318	32.48	
Conservative	Robert Pettigrew	1,312		
Conservative	Andrew Pursglove	1,201		
Labour	Thomas Clayton	780	19.22	
Labour	Erica Halvorsen	725		
Labour	Stuart Vine	690		
Green	Sarah Coote	292	7.19	
Majority		349	8.60	
Turnout		4,057		
Liberal Democrats win (new seat)				
Liberal Democrats win (new seat)				
Liberal Democrats win (new seat)				

=== Central Southsea ===
Southsea Central (3)
Party	Candidate	Votes	%	±%
Conservative	Lee Hunt	1,447	36.22	
Labour	Michael Blandford	1,397	34.96	
Labour	Mark Button	1,374		
Conservative	Peter Montague	1,297		
Conservative	Linda Symes	1,257		
Labour	John Ferrett	1,226		
Liberal Democrats	Benn Berry	639	15.99	
Liberal Democrats	Edward Couldwell	509		
Liberal Democrats	John Wearn	460		
Green	Andrea Smith	259	6.48	
Socialist Alliance	Timothy Evans	160	4.00	
Socialist Alliance	Paul Thatcher	141		
Socialist Alliance	Michael Skiggs	136		
Independent	Daniel Marshman	93	2.32	
Turnout		3,995		
Conservative win (new seat)				
Labour win (new seat)				
Labour win (new seat)				

=== Charles Dickens ===
Charles Dickens (3)
Party	Candidate	Votes	%	±%
Liberal Democrats	Jacqueline Hancock	1,242	45.09	
Labour	Peter Guthrie	1,206	43.79	
Labour	John McIntyre	1,154		
Labour	Lauren Semke	1,140		
Liberal Democrats	James Bowen	976		
Liberal Democrats	Steven Wylie	926		
Conservative	Ellen Hurst	306	11.11	
Conservative	Pamela Lacey	305		
Conservative	Valerie Measures	291		
Turnout		2,754		
Liberal Democrats win (new seat)				
Labour win (new seat)				
Labour win (new seat)				

=== Copnor ===
Copnor (3)
Party	Candidate	Votes	%	±%
Conservative	Michael Park	1,446	47.56	
Conservative	Malcolm Hey	1,386		
Conservative	Alan Langford	1,269		
Labour	Barbara Sparrow	1,060	34.86	
Labour	Gavin Wade	954		
Labour	John Spiegelhalter	929		
Liberal Democrats	Linda Burton	534	17.56	
Liberal Democrats	Shirley Lunn	423		
Liberal Democrats	Roland Rendle	376		
Majority		386	12.69	
Turnout		3,040		
Conservative win (new seat)				
Conservative win (new seat)				
Conservative win (new seat)				

=== Cosham ===
Cosham (3)
Party	Candidate	Votes	%	±%
Labour	Carolyn Lowndes	1,441	48.37	
Labour	Graham Heaney	1,425		
Labour	David Horne	1,367		
Conservative	Dominic Fairfax	1,100	36.92	
Conservative	Lee Mason	1,087		
Conservative	Sylvia Jarman	1,053		
Liberal Democrats	Alan Webb	438	14.70	
Liberal Democrats	Paul Stallard	398		
Liberal Democrats	Wendy Stallard	370		
Majority		341	11.44	
Turnout		2,979		
Labour win (new seat)				
Labour win (new seat)				
Labour win (new seat)				

=== Drayton and Farlington ===
Drayton and Farlington (3)
Party	Candidate	Votes	%	±%
Conservative	Simon Bosher	2,402	55.70	
Conservative	Barry Maine	2,344		
Conservative	Robin Sparshatt	2,338		
Labour	Phyllis Rapson	1,037	24.04	
Labour	Sonia Relf	968		
Liberal Democrats	Patrick Whittle	873	20.24	
Labour	Geoff Wade	819		
Liberal Democrats	Matthew Jensen	618		
Liberal Democrats	Paul Burton	605		
Majority		1,365	31.65	
Turnout		4,312		
Conservative win (new seat)				
Conservative win (new seat)				
Conservative win (new seat)				

=== Eastney and Craneswater ===
Eastney and Craneswater (3)
Party	Candidate	Votes	%	±%
Liberal Democrats	Terry Hall	1,422	45.67	
Liberal Democrats	Anthony Martin	1,358		
Liberal Democrats	Frederick Charlton	1,357		
Conservative	Andrew Storey	1,228	39.44	
Conservative	Selina Corkerton	1,219	39.15	
Conservative	Nicholas Lacey	1,200		
Labour	Anthony Basker	463	14.87	
Labour	June Clarkson	445		
Labour	John Pilkington	391		
Majority		1,422	45.67	
Turnout		3,113		
Liberal Democrats win (new seat)				
Liberal Democrats win (new seat)				
Liberal Democrats win (new seat)				

=== Fratton ===
Fratton (3)
Party	Candidate	Votes	%	±%
Liberal Democrats	Michael Hancock	1,767	61.16	
Liberal Democrats	Philip Shaddock	1,518		
Liberal Democrats	Eleanor Scott	1,452		
Labour	Beverley Hancock	595	20.59	
Conservative	Irene Strange	465	16.09	
Labour	Nicholas Durrant	438		
Conservative	Deborah Tomes	432		
Conservative	Barbara White	420		
Labour	Keith Roberts	374		
Socialist Alliance	Jonathan Molyneux	62	2.14	
Majority		1,172	40.56	
Turnout		2,889		
Liberal Democrats win (new seat)				
Liberal Democrats win (new seat)				
Liberal Democrats win (new seat)				

=== Hilsea ===
Hilsea (3)
Party	Candidate	Votes	%	±%
Labour	Thomas Blair	1,408	45.20	
Conservative	Jezz Baker	1,278	41.02	
Conservative	Alistair Thompson	1,250		
Labour	Donna Abrahart	1,248		
Conservative	Jessica Mott	1,245		
Labour	Michael Tiller	1,171		
Liberal Democrats	Patricia Strawbridge	429	13.77	
Liberal Democrats	Norma Skerratt	424		
Liberal Democrats	Hugh Mason	359		
Turnout		3,115		
Labour win (new seat)				
Conservative win (new seat)				
Conservative win (new seat)				

=== Milton ===
Milton (3)
Party	Candidate	Votes	%	±%
Liberal Democrats	Caroline Scott	1,763	50.71	
Liberal Democrats	Alexander Bentley	1,760		
Liberal Democrats	Nigel Sizer	1,494		
Conservative	Gerald Shimbart	928	26.69	
Conservative	Michael Lowery	880		
Conservative	Peter Wright	823		
Labour	Frances Fox	481	13.83	
Labour	Kenneth Ferrett	445		
Labour	Wendy Hunt	374		
Independent	Marie Adams	304	8.74	
Majority		835	24.02	
Turnout		3,476		
Liberal Democrats win (new seat)				
Liberal Democrats win (new seat)				
Liberal Democrats win (new seat)				

=== Nelson ===
Nelson (3)
Party	Candidate	Votes	%	±%
Labour	Jason Fazackarley	1,261	52.76	
Labour	Patricia Bateman	1,242		
Labour	Leo Madden	1,238		
Conservative	David Plater	704	29.45	
Conservative	Barbara Maine	675		
Conservative	Sandra Plater	635		
Liberal Democrats	Jennifer Evens	425	17.78	
Liberal Democrats	Elizabeth Guy	392		
Liberal Democrats	John Ramsbottom	327		
Majority		557	23.30	
Turnout		2,390		
Labour win (new seat)				
Labour win (new seat)				
Labour win (new seat)				

=== Paulsgrove ===
Paulsgrove (3)
Party	Candidate	Votes	%	±%
Labour	Jim Patey	1,514	60.12	
Labour	Andrew Silvester	1,220		
Labour	Keith Crabbe	1,188		
Conservative	Luke Stubbs	712	28.27	
Conservative	Christopher Jarman	672		
Conservative	Philip Ludlam	649		
Liberal Democrats	Fred Holliday	292	11.59	
Liberal Democrats	Mike Price	291		
Liberal Democrats	Moreena Mohammed-Campey	171		
Majority		802	31.85	
Turnout		2,518		
Labour win (new seat)				
Labour win (new seat)				
Labour win (new seat)				

=== St Jude ===
St Jude (3)
Party	Candidate	Votes	%	±%
Conservative	Elaine Baker	1,108	41.71	
Conservative	George Semmens	1,057		
Conservative	Malcolm Chewter	1,047		
Liberal Democrats	David Butler	769	28.95	
Liberal Democrats	Patricia Inkpen	686		
Liberal Democrats	James Inkpen	681		
Labour	Matthew Gummerson	423	15.92	
Labour	Gerrard Blair	399		
Labour	John Stevenson	393		
Green	Richard Lines	356	13.40	
Majority		339	12.76	
Turnout		2,656		
Conservative win (new seat)				
Conservative win (new seat)				
Conservative win (new seat)				

=== St Thomas ===
St Thomas (3)
Party	Candidate	Votes	%	±%
Conservative	Frank Worley	1,363	45.81	
Conservative	Stephen Wemyss	1,340		
Conservative	Elaine Shimbart	1,276		
Liberal Democrats	Finni Golden	1,070	35.96	
Liberal Democrats	Roisin Kehoe-Pank	977		
Liberal Democrats	Leslie Stevens	956		
Labour	Alwin Oliver	542	18.21	
Labour	Stephen Reid	537		
Labour	Roger Thomas	529		
Majority		293	9.84	
Turnout		2,975		
Conservative win (new seat)				
Conservative win (new seat)				
Conservative win (new seat)				

Preceded by 2000 Portsmouth City Council election	Portsmouth City Council elections	Succeeded by 2003 Portsmouth City Council election
