= 1973 Portsmouth City Council election =

1973 UK local government election

The 1973 Portsmouth City Council election was held on 10 May 1973 as part of the first elections to the new local authorities established by the Local Government Act 1972 in England and Wales. 48 councillors were elected from 16 electoral divisions. Each division returned three councillors each by first-past-the-post voting for a three-year term of office.

The Conservative Party won overall control of the council.

== Election results ==
Portsmouth City Council election, 1973
| Party | Seats | Seats % | Votes % | Votes | Candidates |
|---|---|---|---|---|---|
| Conservative | 28 | 58.3% | 49.8% | 76,844 | 48 |
| Labour | 17 | 35.4% | 44.7% | 68,974 | 48 |
| Independent | 3 | 6.3% | 2.9% | 4,462 | 3 |
| Liberal | 0 | 0.0% | 2.6% | 4,071 | 4 |

== Ward results ==
=== Buckland ===
Buckland (3)
| Party | Candidate | Votes | % | ±% |
|---|---|---|---|---|
| Labour | Syd Rapson | 1,842 | 52.0% | |
| Labour | J. Wearn | 1,734 | | |
| Conservative | R. Taylor | 1,697 | 48.0% | |
| Conservative | Ms V. Lubin | 1,691 | | |
| Labour | I. Christie | 1,642 | | |
| Conservative | B. Lewington | 1,622 | | |
| Turnout | | | 47.4% | |
| Labour win (new seat) | | | | |
| Labour win (new seat) | | | | |
| Conservative win (new seat) | | | | |

=== Cosham ===
Cosham (3)
| Party | Candidate | Votes | % | ±% |
|---|---|---|---|---|
| Independent | P. Ashley | 1,942 | 48.9% | |
| Independent | Ms. M. Anderson | 1,347 | | |
| Independent | W. Dallas | 1,173 | | |
| Conservative | E. Spencer | 1,061 | 26.7% | |
| Labour | K. Sparrow | 966 | 24.3% | |
| Conservative | E. Burke | 925 | | |
| Labour | G. Crowhurst | 907 | | |
| Labour | G. Thompson | 869 | | |
| Conservative | R. Darragh | 849 | | |
| Turnout | | | 43.5% | |
| Independent win (new seat) | | | | |
| Independent win (new seat) | | | | |
| Independent win (new seat) | | | | |

=== Farlington ===
Farlington (3)
| Party | Candidate | Votes | % | ±% |
|---|---|---|---|---|
| Conservative | I. Gibson | 2,556 | 53.4% | |
| Conservative | W. Fry | 2,485 | | |
| Conservative | R. Ostler | 2,267 | | |
| Liberal | Ms. B. Shepherd | 1,533 | 32.0% | |
| Labour | R. Bryant | 695 | 14.5% | |
| Labour | J. Smith | 673 | | |
| Labour | D. Ingham | 673 | | |
| Turnout | | | 45.4% | |
| Conservative win (new seat) | | | | |
| Conservative win (new seat) | | | | |
| Conservative win (new seat) | | | | |

=== Fratton ===
Fratton (3)
| Party | Candidate | Votes | % | ±% |
|---|---|---|---|---|
| Labour | Mike Hancock | 1,544 | 63.4% | |
| Labour | A. Gibbs | 1,504 | | |
| Labour | J. James | 1,393 | | |
| Conservative | Ms. H. Austin | 893 | 36.6% | |
| Conservative | A. Hasker | 855 | | |
| Conservative | K. Jordan | 826 | | |
| Turnout | | | 31.6% | |
| Labour win (new seat) | | | | |
| Labour win (new seat) | | | | |
| Labour win (new seat) | | | | |

=== Havelock ===
Havelock (3)
| Party | Candidate | Votes | % | ±% |
|---|---|---|---|---|
| Labour | C. Johnstone | 2,175 | 50.5% | |
| Conservative | E. Taplin | 2,134 | 49.5% | |
| Conservative | T. Gregory | 2,092 | | |
| Labour | Ms. M. Kenny | 2,046 | | |
| Conservative | B. Pickering | 2,042 | | |
| Labour | D. Brown | 1,985 | | |
| Turnout | | | 46.9% | |
| Labour win (new seat) | | | | |
| Conservative win (new seat) | | | | |
| Conservative win (new seat) | | | | |

=== Highland ===
Highland (3)
| Party | Candidate | Votes | % | ±% |
|---|---|---|---|---|
| Conservative | C. Wakefield | 2,301 | 53.9% | |
| Conservative | A. Elliot | 2,247 | | |
| Conservative | J. Lodge | 2,177 | | |
| Labour | B. Miller | 1,965 | 46.1% | |
| Labour | Mrs. E. Wright | 1,820 | | |
| Labour | G. Lemon | 1,790 | | |
| Turnout | | | 41.9% | |
| Conservative win (new seat) | | | | |
| Conservative win (new seat) | | | | |
| Conservative win (new seat) | | | | |

=== Kingston ===
Kingston (3)
| Party | Candidate | Votes | % | ±% |
|---|---|---|---|---|
| Conservative | R. Hancock | 2,544 | 51.5% | |
| Conservative | J. Brogden | 2,527 | | |
| Labour | P. Chandler | 2,399 | 48.5% | |
| Conservative | E. Loney-Hampton | 2,385 | | |
| Labour | S. Mitchell | 2,299 | | |
| Labour | Ms. J. Sharma | 2,222 | | |
| Turnout | | | 46.6% | |
| Conservative win (new seat) | | | | |
| Conservative win (new seat) | | | | |
| Labour win (new seat) | | | | |

=== Meredith ===
Meredith (3)
| Party | Candidate | Votes | % | ±% |
|---|---|---|---|---|
| Conservative | A. Darby | 2,374 | 55.8% | |
| Conservative | J. Rigby | 2,372 | | |
| Conservative | F. Sorrell | 2,288 | | |
| Labour | W. Stillwell | 1,882 | 44.2% | |
| Labour | P. Kingswell | 1,723 | | |
| Labour | C. Arrowsmith | 1,659 | | |
| Turnout | | | 38.3% | |
| Conservative win (new seat) | | | | |
| Conservative win (new seat) | | | | |
| Conservative win (new seat) | | | | |

=== Nelson ===
Nelson (3)
| Party | Candidate | Votes | % | ±% |
|---|---|---|---|---|
| Conservative | J. Marshall | 2,058 | 55.7% | |
| Conservative | A. Mos | 1,753 | | |
| Labour | P. Hancock | 1,635 | 44.3% | |
| Conservative | C. Fortnum | 1,604 | | |
| Labour | J. Attrill | 1,334 | | |
| Labour | A. Golds | 1,287 | | |
| Turnout | | | 54.6% | |
| Conservative win (new seat) | | | | |
| Conservative win (new seat) | | | | |
| Labour win (new seat) | | | | |

=== North End ===
North End (3)
| Party | Candidate | Votes | % | ±% |
|---|---|---|---|---|
| Conservative | A. Dann | 2,131 | 53.8% | |
| Conservative | K. Hale | 2,115 | | |
| Conservative | Ms. A. Tomlin | 2,093 | | |
| Labour | B. Tyler | 1,829 | 46.2% | |
| Labour | Ms. J. Jamieson | 1,809 | | |
| Labour | J. Patey | 1,726 | | |
| Turnout | | | 40.7% | |
| Conservative win (new seat) | | | | |
| Conservative win (new seat) | | | | |
| Conservative win (new seat) | | | | |

=== Paulsgrove ===
Paulsgrove (3)
| Party | Candidate | Votes | % | ±% |
|---|---|---|---|---|
| Labour | Ms. M. Price | 1,533 | 51.9% | |
| Labour | G. Austin | 1,457 | | |
| Labour | J. Mitchell | 1,416 | | |
| Liberal | R. Schollar | 945 | 32.0% | |
| Liberal | Ms. I. Young | 818 | | |
| Liberal | J. Young | 775 | | |
| Conservative | W. Snelling | 478 | 16.2% | |
| Conservative | M. Rendle | 476 | | |
| Conservative | Ms. J. Snelling | 475 | | |
| Turnout | | | 26.1% | |
| Labour win (new seat) | | | | |
| Labour win (new seat) | | | | |
| Labour win (new seat) | | | | |

=== Portsea ===
Portsea (3)
| Party | Candidate | Votes | % | ±% |
|---|---|---|---|---|
| Labour | Ms. A. Ashworth | 1,312 | 69.3 | |
| Labour | R. Grant | 1,304 | | |
| Labour | R. Thomas | 1,289 | | |
| Conservative | T. Hasker | 580 | 30.7 | |
| Conservative | Mrs. D. Jeram | 566 | | |
| Conservative | H. Osborne | 541 | | |
| Turnout | | | 34.0 | |
| Labour win (new seat) | | | | |
| Labour win (new seat) | | | | |
| Labour win (new seat) | | | | |

=== St. Jude ===
St. Jude (3)
| Party | Candidate | Votes | % | ±% |
|---|---|---|---|---|
| Conservative | R. Sotnick | 1,571 | 71.8 | |
| Conservative | J. Lubin | 1,495 | | |
| Conservative | J. Cockerill | 1,483 | | |
| Labour | M. Smith | 616 | 28.2 | |
| Labour | F. Guy | 601 | | |
| Labour | H. Harris | 576 | | |
| Turnout | | | 26.3 | |
| Conservative win (new seat) | | | | |
| Conservative win (new seat) | | | | |
| Conservative win (new seat) | | | | |

=== St. Mary & Guildhall ===
St. Mary & Guildhall (3)
| Party | Candidate | Votes | % | ±% |
|---|---|---|---|---|
| Labour | E. Kelly | 1,354 | 80.6 | |
| Labour | A. White | 1,316 | | |
| Labour | Mrs. E. Fudge | 1,307 | | |
| Conservative | J. Rothery | 325 | 19.4 | |
| Conservative | A. Stanley | 209 | | |
| Conservative | M. Trett | 295 | | |
| Turnout | | | 30.6 | |
| Labour win (new seat) | | | | |
| Labour win (new seat) | | | | |
| Labour win (new seat) | | | | |

=== St. Simon ===
St. Simon (3)
| Party | Candidate | Votes | % | ±% |
|---|---|---|---|---|
| Conservative | G. Byng | 1,733 | 71.6 | |
| Conservative | Ms. A. Scorey | 1,678 | | |
| Conservative | A. Spraggs | 1,670 | | |
| Labour | Ms. J. Christie | 688 | 28.4 | |
| Labour | B. Armer | 659 | | |
| Labour | D. Elner | 649 | | |
| Turnout | | | 29.9 | |
| Conservative win (new seat) | | | | |
| Conservative win (new seat) | | | | |
| Conservative win (new seat) | | | | |

=== St. Thomas ===
St. Thomas (3)
| Party | Candidate | Votes | % | ±% |
|---|---|---|---|---|
| Conservative | S. Fiddy | 2,157 | 56.2 | |
| Conservative | L. Kitchen | 2,049 | | |
| Conservative | C. Worley | 1,999 | | |
| Labour | R. Bromley | 1,683 | 43.8 | |
| Labour | D. Jewell | 1,635 | | |
| Labour | M. Murphy | 1,552 | | |
| Turnout | | | 37.8 | |
| Conservative win (new seat) | | | | |
| Conservative win (new seat) | | | | |
| Conservative win (new seat) | | | | |
