= Donna Jones (British politician) =

British politician

Hampshire and Isle of Wight Police and Crime Commissioner
- Incumbent
- Assumed office 13 May 2021
- Preceded by: Michael Lane

Leader of the Portsmouth City Council
- In office 4 June 2014 – 12 June 2018
- Preceded by: Gerald Vernon-Jackson (LD)
- Succeeded by: Gerald Vernon-Jackson (LD)

Member of Portsmouth City Council for Hilsea Ward
- In office 1 May 2008 – 6 May 2021
- Preceded by: Jeremy Baler (Con)
- Succeeded by: Daniel Wemyss (Con)

Personal details
- Citizenship: British
- Party: Conservative

Donna Jones is a British Conservative Party politician who has been the Hampshire Police and Crime Commissioner since 2021. She was the youngest member of the judiciary in England and Wales when appointed to be a magistrate in 2005.

== Early life and education ==
Jones was born in May 1977 in Portsmouth. She was educated in Portsmouth, attending Havant College and a local further education college, where she passed three A levels.

== Political career ==
Jones was a councillor for Hilsea on Portsmouth City Council from 1 May 2008 to 6 May 2021. From June 2014 to June 2018, she was Leader of the council, taking over from Gerald Vernon-Jackson, a Liberal Democrat, when there was a change of political control. He returned to the job in 2018.

While she was leader of the Conservative administration at Portsmouth council, Jones advised Portsmouth F.C. as strategic stadium development consultant. The council also launched an energy company, Victory Energy, which entered into a £100,000 sponsorship deal with Portsmouth F.C. In 2020 Victory Energy was wound up with losses of £3.5 million, following attempts by the council to sell the company.

In the 2019 general election, while still serving as a councillor, Jones was the unsuccessful Conservative candidate in Portsmouth South. During the campaign, she received criticism from political opponents for flying in a plane over the constituency, with a banner attached stating "Vote Donna Jones - Get Brexit Done", instead of attending a candidates' hustings on climate change.

Jones remained as a councillor and as leader of the Conservative group in Portsmouth until the 2021 Portsmouth City Council election on 6 May, when she stood down. However, in the 2021 England and Wales police and crime commissioner elections on the same day, Jones was elected as Hampshire Police and Crime Commissioner for Hampshire and the Isle of Wight. Jones was re-elected in the 2024 election.

On 3 August 2024, in response to riots in some UK cities, she issued a media release which said the rioting had "escalated to a worrying level" and that "the behaviour of some of those protesting has been extremely violent, highly distressing and absolutely criminal". She also said: "I've spoken to people from both sides of the spectrum and the only way to stem the tide of violent disorder is to acknowledge what is causing it. Arresting people, or creating violent disorder units, is treating the symptom and not the cause". The Independent suggested that Jones "appears to justify far-right riots". She linked the disturbances to what she said was "mass uncontrolled immigration". This media release was subsequently removed from the Police and Crime Commission's website, having generated widespread criticism, including calls for Jones to resign.

On 13 March 2025, she announced her plans to run to be the first Mayor of Hampshire and the Solent.

== Electoral history ==
=== Police and Crime Commissioner ===
2021 Hampshire police and crime commissioner election
Party	Candidate	1st round		2nd round			1st round votesTransfer votes, 2nd round
Party	Candidate	Total	Of round	Transfers	Total	Of round	1st round votesTransfer votes, 2nd round
Conservative	Donna Jones	262,667	49.84%	50,326	312,993	68.23%	
Labour Co-op	Tony Bunday	101,832	19.32%	43,919	145,751	31.77%	
Liberal Democrats	Richard Murphy	93,581	17.76%				
Hampshire Independents	Steve James-Bailey	68,895	13.07%				
Turnout		526,975	36.19%				
Conservative hold							

Donna Jones won every counting area in Hampshire, with the closest being the traditionally-Labour City of Southampton, where she won by 877 votes.

=== Parliamentary ===
General election 2019: Portsmouth South
Party	Candidate	Votes	%	±%
Labour	Stephen Morgan	23,068	48.6	+7.6
Conservative	Donna Jones	17,705	37.3	−0.3
Liberal Democrats	Gerald Vernon-Jackson	5,418	11.4	−5.9
Brexit Party	John Kennedy	994	2.1	New
JAC	Steven George	240	0.5	New
Majority		5,363	11.3	+7.9
Turnout		47,425	63.9	0.0
Labour hold		Swing	+3.9	

=== Portsmouth City Council ===
Hilsea Ward, 2016
Party	Candidate	Votes	%	±%
Conservative	Donna Jones*	1,566	54.6	+10.2
Labour	Silvi Veale	922	32.1	−9.6
Liberal Democrats	Julie Spurgeon	380	13.2	−0.7
Majority		644	22.5	+19.8
Turnout		2,868	27.9	+1.6
Conservative hold		Swing	9.9% Lab to Con	

Hilsea Ward, 2012
Party	Candidate	Votes	%	±%
Conservative	Donna Jones	1,207	44.4	−16.3
Labour	Sue Castillon	1,133	41.7	+22.8
Liberal Democrats	Simon Dodd	379	13.9	+1.9
Majority		74	2.7	−39.1
Turnout		2,719	26.3	−4.1
Conservative hold		Swing	19.6% Con to Lab	

Hilsea Ward, 2008
Party	Candidate	Votes	%	±%
Conservative	Donna Jones	1,804	60.7	+9.4
Labour	Michelle Treacher	562	18.9	−7.4
Liberal Democrats	Fred Holliday	357	12.0	−10.3
English Democrat	Matthew Clark	243	8.2	+8.2
Majority		1,242	41.8	+8.7
Turnout		2,973	30.4	−2.7
Conservative hold		Swing	8.4% Lab to Con	
