= 2003 Portsmouth City Council election =

2003 UK local government election

- 1 May 2003

14 of 42 seats to Portsmouth City Council 22 seats needed for a majority
	First party	Second party	Third party
Party	Liberal Democrats	Conservative	Labour
Seats won	16	15	11
Popular vote	13,281	13,738	9,798
- Results by Ward
Council control before election
No overall control
Council control after election
No overall control

Elections to Portsmouth City Council were held on 1 May 2003. One-third of the council seats were up for election, and the council remained under no overall control. Overall turnout was 26.6%.

After the election, the composition of the council was:

- Liberal Democrat 16
- Conservative 15
- Labour 11

== Election result ==
2003 Portsmouth City Council election
Party	This election			Full council			This election		
Party	Seats	Net	Seats %	Other	Total	Total %	Votes	Votes %	+/−
Liberal Democrats	7	▲3	50.0	9	16	38.1	13,281	35.3	+5.6
Conservative	5	Steady	35.7	10	15	35.7	13,738	36.5	-1.1
Labour	2	▼3	14.3	9	11	26.2	9,798	26.0	-5.2
Green	0	Steady	0.0	0	0	0.0	360	1.0	+0.3
Independent	0	Steady	0.0	0	0	0.0	254	0.7	+0.4
Socialist Alliance	0	Steady	0.0	0	0	0.0	193	0.5	+0.1

== Ward results ==
=== Baffins ===
Baffins
Party	Candidate	Votes	%	±%
Liberal Democrats	Geoffrey Goble	1,638	50.1	
Conservative	Neil Pettigrew	1,055	32.2	
Labour	Simon Bramwell	434	13.3	
Green	Sarah Coote	145	4.4	
Majority		583	17.9	
Turnout		3,272	32.1	
Liberal Democrats hold		Swing		

=== Central Southsea ===
Central Southsea
Party	Candidate	Votes	%	±%
Conservative	Deborah Tomes	1,271	41.2	
Labour	Mark Button	1,118	36.2	
Liberal Democrats	Edward Couldwell	575	18.6	
Socialist Alliance	Timothy Evans	121	3.9	
Majority		153	5.0	
Turnout		3,085	28.3	
Conservative gain from Labour		Swing		

=== Charles Dickens ===
Charles Dickens
Party	Candidate	Votes	%	±%
Liberal Democrats	Steven Wylie	1,123	46.4	
Labour	John McIntyre	874	36.1	
Conservative	Andrew Pursglove	333	13.7	
Independent	Roland Woods	92	3.8	
Majority		249	10.3	
Turnout		2,422	23.1	
Liberal Democrats gain from Labour		Swing		

=== Copnor ===
Copnor
Party	Candidate	Votes	%	±%
Conservative	Alan Langford	1,118	47.5	
Labour	Barbara Sparrow	761	32.3	
Liberal Democrats	Jennifer Evans	477	20.2	
Majority		357	15.2	
Turnout		2,356	23.5	
Conservative hold		Swing		

=== Cosham ===
Cosham
Party	Candidate	Votes	%	±%
Conservative	Lee Mason	1,048	40.6	
Labour	Stephen Reid	936	36.3	
Liberal Democrats	Alan Webb	596	23.1	
Majority		108	4.3	
Turnout		2,580	26.3	
Conservative gain from Labour		Swing		

=== Drayton and Farlington ===
Drayton and Farlington
Party	Candidate	Votes	%	±%
Conservative	Robin Sparshatt	1,848	51.5	
Liberal Democrats	Patrick Whittle	1,157	32.3	
Labour	Sonia Relf	582	16.2	
Majority		691	19.2	
Turnout		3,587	36.6	
Conservative hold		Swing		

=== Eastney and Craneswater ===
Eastney and Craneswater
Party	Candidate	Votes	%	±%
Liberal Democrats	Frederick Charlton	1,410	48.6	
Conservative	Nicholas Lacey	1,070	36.9	
Labour	June Clarkson	419	14.5	
Majority		340	11.7	
Turnout		2,899	28.6	
Liberal Democrats hold		Swing		

=== Fratton ===
Fratton
Party	Candidate	Votes	%	±%
Liberal Democrats	Eleanor Scott	1,102	52.6	
Labour	Beverley Hancock	545	26.0	
Conservative	Peter Ross	450	21.5	
Majority		557	26.6	
Turnout		2,097	20.2	
Liberal Democrats hold		Swing		

=== Hilsea ===
Hilsea
Party	Candidate	Votes	%	±%
Conservative	Alistair Thompson	1,281	45.1	
Labour	John Ferrett	1,126	39.6	
Liberal Democrats	Hugh Mason	435	15.3	
Majority		155	5.5	
Turnout		2,842	28.5	
Conservative hold		Swing		

=== Milton ===
Milton
Party	Candidate	Votes	%	±%
Liberal Democrats	Robert Vernon-Jackson	1,547	51.3	
Conservative	Gerald Shimbart	822	27.3	
Labour	Kenneth Ferrett	372	12.3	
Independent	Nigel Sizer	162	5.4	
Green	Andrea Smith	112	3.7	
Majority		725	24.0	
Turnout		3,015	31.7	
Liberal Democrats hold		Swing		

=== Nelson ===
Nelson
Party	Candidate	Votes	%	±%
Labour	Leo Madden	987	46.5	
Conservative	Selina Corkerton	717	33.8	
Liberal Democrats	James Bowden	417	19.7	
Majority		270	12.7	
Turnout		2,121	20.5	
Labour hold		Swing		

=== Paulsgrove ===
Paulsgrove
Party	Candidate	Votes	%	±%
Labour	David Horne	1,012	51.0	
Conservative	Luke Stubbs	659	33.2	
Liberal Democrats	Michael Price	211	10.6	
Green	Brian Bundy	103	5.2	
Majority		353	17.8	
Turnout		1,985	19.7	
Labour hold		Swing		

=== St Jude ===
St Jude
Party	Candidate	Votes	%	±%
Liberal Democrats	David Butler	1,106	45.3	
Conservative	Malcolm Chewter	1,033	42.3	
Labour	Matthew Gummerson	304	12.4	
Majority		73	3.0	
Turnout		2,443	25.9	
Liberal Democrats gain from Conservative		Swing		

=== St Thomas ===
St Thomas
Party	Candidate	Votes	%	±%
Liberal Democrats	Leslie Stevens	1,487	50.9	
Conservative	Elaine Shimbart	1,033	35.4	
Labour	Alwin Oliver	328	11.2	
Socialist Alliance	Paul Thatcher	72	2.5	
Majority		454	15.5	
Turnout		2,920	28.3	
Liberal Democrats gain from Conservative		Swing		

Preceded by 2002 Portsmouth City Council election	Portsmouth City Council elections	Succeeded by 2004 Portsmouth City Council election
