= 2006 Portsmouth City Council election =

2006 UK local government election

Map of the results of the 2006 Portsmouth council election. Conservatives in blue, Liberal Democrats in yellow and Labour in red.

Elections to Portsmouth City Council were held on 4 May 2006. One third of the council was up for election and the council stayed under no overall control.

After the election, the composition of the council was:

- Liberal Democrat 21
- Conservative 16
- Labour 5

== Election result ==
Portsmouth local election result 2006
Party	Seats	Gains	Losses	Net gain/loss	Seats %	Votes %	Votes	+/−
Conservative	7	3	1	+2	50.0	42.3	19,034	+4.3%
Liberal Democrats	5	1	1	0	35.7	33.6	15,122	-5.7%
Labour	2	0	2	-2	14.3	18.1	8,151	-2.6%
Green	0	0	0	0	0	3.2	1,435	+1.9%
Independent	0	0	0	0	0	1.3	572	+1.3%
English Democrat	0	0	0	0	0	1.0	435	+1.0%
Respect	0	0	0	0	0	0.5	217	+0.5%

== Ward results ==
Baffins
Party	Candidate	Votes	%	±%
Liberal Democrats	Darron Phillips	1,663	45.6	−1.0
Conservative	Nigel Sizer	1,267	34.8	+2.0
Labour	Victoria Fry	443	12.2	+0.4
Green	Sarah Coote	271	7.4	−1.4
Majority		396	10.8	−3.0
Turnout		3,644	35.3	−1.7
Liberal Democrats hold		Swing		

Central Southsea
Party	Candidate	Votes	%	±%
Conservative	Lee Hunt	1,435	39.5	+4.6
Liberal Democrats	John Ireland	1,298	35.7	−3.3
Labour	John Ferrett	470	12.9	−13.2
Green	Betty Burns	428	11.8	+11.8
Majority		137	3.8	
Turnout		3,631	36.4	−3.1
Conservative hold		Swing		

Charles Dickens
Party	Candidate	Votes	%	±%
Liberal Democrats	Jacqueline Hancock	1,276	50.0	−2.4
Labour	Keith Crabbe	583	22.8	−7.9
Conservative	Michael Lowery	476	18.7	+1.8
Respect	Lee Sprake	217	8.5	+8.5
Majority		693	27.2	+5.5
Turnout		2,552	26.4	−0.8
Liberal Democrats hold		Swing		

Copnor
Party	Candidate	Votes	%	±%
Conservative	Michael Park	1,470	46.4	−3.0
Labour	Michelle Treacher	588	18.6	−3.5
Liberal Democrats	Peter Eddis	537	17.0	−11.5
English Democrat	David Knight	435	13.7	+13.7
Green	Anthony George	136	4.3	+4.3
Majority		882	27.8	+6.9
Turnout		3,166	32.5	+0.6
Conservative hold		Swing		

Cosham
Party	Candidate	Votes	%	±%
Conservative	April Windebank	1,781	54.5	+10.4
Labour	Donna Abrahart	809	24.7	−9.8
Liberal Democrats	Alan Webb	680	20.8	−0.7
Majority		972	29.8	+20.2
Turnout		3,270	33.8	−3.3
Conservative gain from Labour		Swing		

Drayton and Farlington
Party	Candidate	Votes	%	±%
Conservative	Simon Bosher	2,648	61.3	+14.6
Liberal Democrats	Patrick Whittle	1,234	28.6	−13.8
Labour	Andrew Silvester	438	10.1	−0.9
Majority		1,414	32.7	+28.4
Turnout		4,320	43.9	−4.1
Conservative hold		Swing		

Eastney and Craneswater
Party	Candidate	Votes	%	±%
Conservative	Luke Stubbs	1,618	46.2	+8.4
Liberal Democrats	Theresa Hall	1,601	45.7	+0.1
Labour	Geoffrey Wade	286	8.2	−1.1
Majority		17	0.5	
Turnout		3,505	37.6	−2.4
Conservative gain from Liberal Democrats		Swing		

Fratton
Party	Candidate	Votes	%	±%
Liberal Democrats	Michael Hancock	1,551	59.8	+6.7
Conservative	Peter Ross	724	27.9	+6.1
Labour	Peter Guthrie	318	12.3	−2.4
Majority		827	31.9	+0.6
Turnout		2,593	26.8	−2.5
Liberal Democrats hold		Swing		

Hilsea
Party	Candidate	Votes	%	±%
Conservative	Frank Jonas	2,049	60.8	+9.5
Labour	Thomas Blair	889	26.4	+0.1
Liberal Democrats	Alex Naylor	432	12.8	−9.5
Majority		1,160	34.4	+9.4
Turnout		3,370	34.5	+1.4
Conservative gain from Labour		Swing		

Milton
Party	Candidate	Votes	%	±%
Liberal Democrats	Caroline Scott	1,386	41.3	−11.5
Conservative	Hilary Collins	1,325	39.5	+8.6
Green	Alan Bish	334	10.0	+10.0
Labour	Kenneth Ferrett	310	9.2	−7.1
Majority		61	1.8	−20.1
Turnout		3,355	35.7	−1.1
Liberal Democrats hold		Swing		

Nelson
Party	Candidate	Votes	%	±%
Labour	Jason Fazackarley	1,049	39.3	−0.6
Conservative	Selina Corkerton	824	30.9	−3.1
Liberal Democrats	Benn Berry	527	19.8	−6.3
Green	Calum Kennedy	266	10.0	+10.0
Majority		225	8.4	+2.5
Turnout		2,666	27.1	−0.7
Labour hold		Swing		

Paulsgrove
Party	Candidate	Votes	%	±%
Labour	James Patey	1,336	49.7	+9.7
Conservative	James Williams	922	34.3	−6.0
Liberal Democrats	Harry Dickinson	428	15.9	−3.8
Majority		414	15.4	
Turnout		2,686	27.8	+1.5
Labour hold		Swing		

St Jude
Party	Candidate	Votes	%	±%
Conservative	Linda Symes	1,132	38.8	−0.8
Liberal Democrats	Roger Inkpen	1,044	35.8	−14.1
Independent	Elaine Baker	572	19.6	+19.6
Labour	Simon Payne	172	5.9	−4.6
Majority		88	3.0	
Turnout		2,920	33.6	−1.9
Conservative hold		Swing		

St Thomas
Party	Candidate	Votes	%	±%
Liberal Democrats	Richard Jensen	1,465	44.6	−1.7
Conservative	Sandra Theresa	1,363	41.5	−1.1
Labour	Beverley Hancock	460	14.0	+3.9
Majority		102	3.1	−0.6
Turnout		3,288	35.8	−3.8
Liberal Democrats gain from Conservative		Swing		

Preceded by 2004 Portsmouth City Council election	Portsmouth City Council elections	Succeeded by 2007 Portsmouth City Council election
