= 2014 Portsmouth City Council election =

City council elections in Portsmouth, Hampshire, England

Map of the results of the 2014 Portsmouth City Council election. UKIP in purple, Conservatives in blue, Liberal Democrats in orange and Labour in red.

The 2014 Portsmouth City Council elections took place on Thursday 22 May 2014 to elect members of Portsmouth City Council in Hampshire, England. One third of the council's seats were contested using the first-past-the-post voting system, alongside elections to the European Parliament. The ruling Liberal Democrat group lost control of the council to No overall control, with UKIP making 6 gains to win their first seats on the Council.

After the election, the composition of the council was:

- Liberal Democrats - 18 (-5)
- Conservatives - 12 (0)
- UKIP - 6 (+6)
- Labour - 4 (-1)

Following the elections, a Conservative minority administration was formed, replacing the previous Liberal Democrat majority that had governed Portsmouth since 2009. This administration was formed with the support of Labour and UKIP

== Election result ==
Portsmouth local election result 2014
Party	Seats	Gains	Losses	Net gain/loss	Seats %	Votes %	Votes	+/−
UKIP	6	6	0	6	42.9	24.7	11,761	+24.7
Conservative	5	1	1	0	35.7	28.2	13,412	-8.6
Liberal Democrats	3	0	4	-4	21.4	21.1	10,024	-17.4
Labour	0	0	1	-1	0.0	19.5	9,289	+0.1
Green	0	0	0	0	0.0	3.2	1,519	+2.0
TUSC	0	0	0	0	0.0	1.8	849	+1.8
Independent	0	0	1	-1	0.0	1.3	628	+0.7
JAC	0	0	0	0	0.0	0.2	80	+0.2

== Ward results ==
Comparisons for the purpose of determining a gain, hold or loss of a seat, and for all percentage changes, is to the last time these specific seats were up for election in 2010.

Baffins
Party	Candidate	Votes	%	±%
UKIP	Steve Hastings	1,207	31.3	N/A
Liberal Democrats	Drusilla Moody	1,116	28.9	−17.0
Conservative	Jennie Brent	806	20.9	−9.6
Labour	Michelle Treacher	642	16.7	+1.8
TUSC	Wendy Hamm	84	2.2	N/A
Majority		91	2.3	N/A
Turnout		3,855	34.1	−31.5
UKIP gain from Liberal Democrats		Swing		

Central Southsea
Party	Candidate	Votes	%	±%
Liberal Democrats	Lee Hunt	1,078	31.3	−18.2
Conservative	Kevan Chippindall-Higgin	597	17.4	−8.0
Green	Ian McCulloch	580	16.9	+10.2
UKIP	Derek Wareham	574	16.7	N/A
Labour	Richard Brown	542	15.8	+1.5
TUSC	Dan Sutton-Johanson	68	2.0	N/A
Majority		481	14.0	−10.1
Turnout		3,439	30.6	−30.5
Liberal Democrats hold		Swing	5.1% LD to Con	

Charles Dickens
Party	Candidate	Votes	%	±%
UKIP	Paul Godier	940	31.5	N/A
Liberal Democrats	Jacqui Hancock	913	30.6	−20.3
Labour	Sion Reynolds	706	23.7	+2.4
Conservative	Shaun Rogers	326	10.9	−11.3
TUSC	Paul Smith	72	2.4	N/A
The Justice and Anti-Corruption Party	Jason Packer	28	0.9	N/A
Majority		27	0.9	N/A
Turnout		2,985	24.3	−20.4
UKIP gain from Liberal Democrats		Swing		

Copnor
Party	Candidate	Votes	%	±%
UKIP	Alicia Denny	1,029	31.6	N/A
Conservative	Jonathan Kemp	984	30.2	−12.1
Labour	Sam Jones	684	21.0	−1.7
Liberal Democrats	Steve Fletcher	511	15.7	−11.4
TUSC	Ben Norman	52	1.6	N/A
Majority		45	1.4	N/A
Turnout		3,260	32.4	−32.1
UKIP gain from Conservative		Swing		

Cosham
Party	Candidate	Votes	%	±%
Conservative	Hannah Hockaday	1,158	31.0	−12.5
UKIP	Michael Jerome	895	24.0	N/A
Labour	Graham Heaney	847	22.7	−5.8
Liberal Democrats	Kirstine Impey	598	16.0	−5.0
Green	Gavin Ellis	168	4.5	N/A
TUSC	Adi Graham	70	1.9	N/A
Majority		263	7.0	−8.0
Turnout		3,736	35.8	−26.6
Conservative hold		Swing		

Drayton and Farlington
Party	Candidate	Votes	%	±%
Conservative	Simon Bosher	2,166	53.0	−3.8
UKIP	Douglas Denny	902	22.1	N/A
Labour	Andreas Bubel	666	16.3	−0.2
Liberal Democrats	Mel O'Brien	297	7.3	−14.8
TUSC	Simon Wade	56	1.4	N/A
Majority		1,264	30.9	−3.8
Turnout		4,087	39.7	−33.5
Conservative hold		Swing		

Eastney and Craneswater
Party	Candidate	Votes	%	±%
Conservative	Luke Stubbs	1,550	39.7	−4.0
Liberal Democrats	Suzy Horton	1,104	28.3	−12.8
UKIP	Mike George	574	14.7	N/A
Labour	Hannah Wright	372	9.5	−1.2
Green	Michael Muehl	255	6.5	N/A
TUSC	Sean Hoyle	47	1.2	N/A
Majority		446	11.4	+8.8
Turnout		3,902	40.0	−26.2
Conservative hold		Swing	4.4% LD to Con	

Fratton
Party	Candidate	Votes	%	±%
UKIP	Julie Swan	903	31.2	N/A
Labour	Thomas Coles	754	26.1	+12.3
Independent	Mike Hancock	628	21.7	−37.0*
Conservative	David Tompkins	498	17.2	−9.9
TUSC	John Pickett	58	2.0	N/A
The Justice and Anti-Corruption Party	Steven George	52	1.8	N/A
Majority		149	5.2	N/A
Turnout		2,893	27.1	−27.5
UKIP gain from Independent		Swing		

- - Hancock share compared to his performance under Liberal Democrat label in 2010.

Hilsea
Party	Candidate	Votes	%	±%
Conservative	Frank Jonas	1,366	40.8	−8.5
Labour	Sue Greenfield	851	25.4	−0.8
UKIP	Barry Young	851	25.4	N/A
Liberal Democrats	Simon Dodd	212	6.3	−12.7
TUSC	Brian Dolley	64	1.9	N/A
Majority		515	15.4	−7.7
Turnout		3,344	31.8	−30.5
Conservative hold		Swing		

Milton
Party	Candidate	Votes	%	±%
Liberal Democrats	Ben Dowling	1,096	30.2	−19.3
UKIP	Paul Lovegrove	887	24.5	N/A
Labour	Alex Bentley	770	21.2	+7.4
Conservative	Stuart Crow	759	20.9	−9.5
TUSC	Doug Willis	112	3.1	N/A
Majority		209	5.8	−13.3
Turnout		3,624	33.5	−30.2
Liberal Democrats hold		Swing		

Nelson
Party	Candidate	Votes	%	±%
UKIP	Colin Galloway	946	31.2	N/A
Liberal Democrats	Jason Fazackarley	902	29.7	−10.6
Labour	Rob Smith	726	23.9	−2.8
Conservative	Shilpika Sharma	416	13.7	−12.9
TUSC	Gordon Spellman	43	1.4	N/A
Majority		44	1.5	N/A
Turnout		3,033	29.1	−25.9
UKIP gain from Liberal Democrats		Swing		

Paulsgrove
Party	Candidate	Votes	%	±%
UKIP	Stuart Potter	1,098	40.0	N/A
Labour	Sue Castillon	833	30.3	−9.8
Conservative	Ryan Brent	551	20.1	−15.6
Green	Phil Dickinson	129	4.7	N/A
Liberal Democrats	Alan Webb	121	4.4	−12.1
TUSC	Stewart Hurdle	14	0.5	+0.5
Majority		265	9.7	+9.7
Turnout		2,746	26.7	−27.6
UKIP gain from Labour		Swing		

St Jude
Party	Candidate	Votes	%	±%
Conservative	Linda Symes	1,166	36.3	+1.4
Liberal Democrats	Peter Eddis	843	26.2	−20.6
UKIP	Guy Bradford	395	12.3	N/A
Green	Eloise Shavelar	387	12.0	+5.8
Labour	Tony Chafer	382	11.9	+0.4
TUSC	Andy Waterman	42	1.3	N/A
Majority		313	9.7	N/A
Turnout		3,215	35.5	−24.6
Conservative gain from Liberal Democrats		Swing	11.0% LD to Con	

St Thomas
Party	Candidate	Votes	%	±%
Liberal Democrats	Rob Wood	1,233	35.8	−13.4
Conservative	Terry Henderson	1,069	31.0	−5.9
UKIP	Chris Everest	560	16.3	N/A
Labour	Julian Wright	514	14.9	+2.3
TUSC	Adrian Lavin	67	1.9	N/A
Majority		164	4.8	−7.5
Turnout		3,443	33.9	−23.0
Liberal Democrats hold		Swing	3.8% LD to Con	

Preceded by 2012 Portsmouth City Council election	Portsmouth City Council elections	Succeeded by 2015 Portsmouth City Council election
