= 2007 Portsmouth City Council election =

2007 UK local government election

Results of the 2007 Portsmouth City Council election by ward

Elections to Portsmouth City Council were held on 3 May 2007. One third of the council was up for election and the council stayed under no overall control.

After the election, the composition of the council was:

- Liberal Democrat 19
- Conservative 17
- Labour 5
- Independent 1

== Election result ==
Portsmouth local election result 2007
Party	Seats	Gains	Losses	Net gain/loss	Seats %	Votes %	Votes	+/−
Liberal Democrats	7	1	1	0	50.0	33.9	14,706	+0.3%
Conservative	5	1	0	+1	35.7	40.6	17,611	-1.7%
Labour	2	0	0	0	14.3	15.9	6,909	-2.2%
English Democrat	0	0	0	0	0	5.9	2,563	+4.9%
Green	0	0	0	0	0	2.5	1,069	-0.7%
Independent	0	0	1	-1	0	0.7	300	-0.6%
Respect	0	0	0	0	0	0.5	207	0.0%

== Ward results ==
=== Baffins ===
Baffins
Party	Candidate	Votes	%	±%
Liberal Democrats	Lynne Stagg	1,601	45.5	−0.1
Conservative	Jim Fleming	1,211	34.4	−0.4
Labour	Vicky Fry	337	9.6	−2.6
English Democrat	Stephen Male	188	5.3	+5.3
Green	Sarah Coote	183	5.2	−2.2
Majority		390	11.1	+0.3
Turnout		3,520	33.7	−1.6
Liberal Democrats gain from Independent		Swing		

=== Central Southsea ===
Central Southsea
Party	Candidate	Votes	%	±%
Conservative	Margaret Adair	1,284	37.6	−1.9
Liberal Democrats	Debbie Tomes	1,003	29.4	−6.3
Labour	Donna Abrahart	456	13.3	+0.4
Green	Betty Burns	374	10.9	−0.9
Independent	Mark Austin	300	8.8	+8.8
Majority		281	8.2	+4.4
Turnout		3,417	34.1	−2.3
Conservative gain from Liberal Democrats		Swing		

=== Charles Dickens ===
Charles Dickens
Party	Candidate	Votes	%	±%
Liberal Democrats	Steven Wylie	967	39.9	−10.1
Labour	Keith Crabbe	535	22.1	−0.7
Conservative	Gerald Oldfield	427	17.6	−1.1
Respect	Lee Sprake	207	8.5	+0.0
English Democrat	David Farley	158	6.5	+6.5
Green	Darren Curtis	130	5.4	+5.4
Majority		432	17.8	−9.4
Turnout		2,424	24.9	−1.5
Liberal Democrats hold		Swing		

=== Copnor ===
Copnor
Party	Candidate	Votes	%	±%
Conservative	Alan Langford	1,289	46.3	−0.1
Labour	Simon Payne	525	18.9	+0.3
Liberal Democrats	Beryl Wright	488	17.5	+0.5
English Democrat	David Knight	482	17.3	+3.6
Majority		764	27.4	−0.4
Turnout		2,784	28.3	−4.2
Conservative hold		Swing		

=== Cosham ===
Cosham
Party	Candidate	Votes	%	±%
Conservative	Lee Mason	1,439	49.0	−5.5
Labour	Andy Silvester	701	23.9	−0.8
Liberal Democrats	Alan Webb	488	16.6	−4.2
English Democrat	David Ward	307	10.5	+10.5
Majority		783	25.1	−4.7
Turnout		2,935	29.8	−4.0
Conservative hold		Swing		

=== Drayton and Farlington ===
Drayton and Farlington
Party	Candidate	Votes	%	±%
Conservative	Robin Sparshatt	2,453	59.4	−1.9
Liberal Democrats	Patrick Whittle	944	22.8	−5.8
Labour	Sarah Cook	396	9.6	−0.5
English Democrat	Alan Wakeford	339	8.2	+8.2
Majority		1,509	36.6	+3.9
Turnout		4,132	41.7	−2.2
Conservative hold		Swing		

=== Eastney and Craneswater ===
Eastney and Craneswater
Party	Candidate	Votes	%	±%
Liberal Democrats	Terry Hall	1,961	54.8	+9.1
Conservative	Mike Lowery	1,378	38.5	−7.7
Labour	John Ferrett	237	6.6	−1.6
Majority		583	16.3	
Turnout		3,576	38.1	+0.5
Liberal Democrats hold		Swing		

=== Fratton ===
Fratton
Party	Candidate	Votes	%	±%
Liberal Democrats	Eleanor Scott	1,391	56.0	−3.8
Conservative	Angus Ross	571	23.0	−4.9
Labour	Simon Bramwell	310	12.5	+0.2
English Democrat	Richard Glew	212	8.5	+8.5
Majority		820	33.0	+1.1
Turnout		2,484	25.4	−1.4
Liberal Democrats hold		Swing		

=== Hilsea ===
Hilsea
Party	Candidate	Votes	%	±%
Conservative	Alistair Thompson	1,736	58.0	−2.8
Labour	Michelle Treacher	660	22.0	−4.4
Liberal Democrats	Phillip Smith	325	10.9	−1.9
English Democrat	Alan Green	273	9.1	+9.1
Majority		1,076	36.0	+1.6
Turnout		2,994	30.3	−4.2
Conservative hold		Swing		

=== Milton ===
Milton
Party	Candidate	Votes	%	±%
Liberal Democrats	Gerald Vernon-Jackson	1,681	43.3	+2.0
Conservative	Sarah Dinenage	1,644	42.4	+2.9
Labour	Ken Ferrett	235	6.1	−3.1
Green	Alan Bish	214	5.5	−4.5
English Democrat	Matthew Clark	104	2.7	+2.7
Majority		37	0.9	−0.9
Turnout		3,878	40.2	+4.5
Liberal Democrats hold		Swing		

=== Nelson ===
Nelson
Party	Candidate	Votes	%	±%
Labour	Leo Madden	840	31.9	−7.4
Liberal Democrats	Alex Naylor	717	27.2	+7.4
Conservative	Selina Corkerton	711	27.0	−3.9
English Democrat	Kevin Baker	199	7.6	+7.6
Green	Calum Kennedy	168	6.4	−3.6
Majority		123	4.7	−3.7
Turnout		2,635	26.3	−0.8
Labour hold		Swing		

=== Paulsgrove ===
Paulsgrove
Party	Candidate	Votes	%	±%
Labour	David Horne	1,135	46.7	−3.0
Conservative	James Williams	765	31.5	−2.8
English Democrat	Clive Percy	301	12.4	+12.4
Liberal Democrats	Jason Nelson	230	9.5	−6.4
Majority		370	15.2	−0.2
Turnout		2,431	25.0	−2.8
Labour hold		Swing		

=== St Jude ===
St Jude
Party	Candidate	Votes	%	±%
Liberal Democrats	David Butler	1,341	47.0	+11.2
Conservative	Jackie Ciccarone	1,258	44.0	+5.2
Labour	Alwin Oliver	257	9.0	+3.1
Majority		83	3.0	
Turnout		2,856	33.0	−0.6
Liberal Democrats hold		Swing		

=== St Thomas ===
St Thomas
Party	Candidate	Votes	%	±%
Liberal Democrats	Les Stevens	1,569	47.6	+3.0
Conservative	Sandra Theresa	1,445	43.8	+2.3
Labour	John Speigelhalter	285	8.6	−5.4
Majority		124	3.8	+0.7
Turnout		3299	34.8	−1.0
Liberal Democrats hold		Swing		

Preceded by 2006 Portsmouth City Council election	Portsmouth City Council elections	Succeeded by 2008 Portsmouth City Council election
