= 2004 Portsmouth City Council election =

2004 UK local government election

Map of the results of the 2004 Portsmouth council election. Liberal Democrats in yellow, Conservatives in blue and Labour in red.

Elections to Portsmouth City Council were held on 10 June 2004. One third of the council was up for election and the council stayed under no overall control. Overall turnout was 34.9%.

After the election, the composition of the council was:

- Liberal Democrat 20
- Conservative 15
- Labour 7

== Election result ==
Portsmouth local election result 2004
Party	Seats	Gains	Losses	Net gain/loss	Seats %	Votes %	Votes	+/−
Liberal Democrats	8	4	0	+4	57.1	39.3	17,239	+4.0%
Conservative	5	2	2	0	35.7	38.0	16,658	+1.5%
Labour	1	0	4	-4	7.1	20.7	9,071	-5.3%
Green	0	0	0	0	0	1.3	575	+0.3%
BNP	0	0	0	0	0	0.6	278	+0.6%

== Ward results ==
Baffins
Party	Candidate	Votes	%	±%
Liberal Democrats	Michael Andrewes	1,662	46.6	−3.5
Conservative	Graham Smith	1,170	32.8	+0.6
Labour	Simon Payne	421	11.8	−1.5
Green	Sarah Coote	315	8.8	+4.4
Majority		492	13.8	−4.1
Turnout		3,568	37.0	+4.9
Liberal Democrats hold		Swing		

Central Southsea
Party	Candidate	Votes	%	±%
Liberal Democrats	Howard Jones	1,371	39.0	+20.4
Conservative	Malcolm Chewter	1,228	34.9	−6.3
Labour	Michael Blandford	917	26.1	−10.1
Majority		143	4.1	
Turnout		3,516	39.5	+11.2
Liberal Democrats gain from Labour		Swing		

Charles Dickens
Party	Candidate	Votes	%	±%
Liberal Democrats	Margaret Foster	1,299	52.4	+6.0
Labour	Peter Guthrie	761	30.7	−5.4
Conservative	Sandra Stockdale	420	16.9	+3.2
Majority		538	21.7	+11.4
Turnout		2,480	27.2	+4.1
Liberal Democrats gain from Labour		Swing		

Copnor
Party	Candidate	Votes	%	±%
Conservative	Malcolm Hey	1,468	49.4	+1.9
Liberal Democrats	Darren Phillips	845	28.5	+8.3
Labour	Barbara Sparrow	657	22.1	−10.2
Majority		623	20.9	−2.6
Turnout		2,970	31.9	+8.4
Conservative hold		Swing		

Cosham
Party	Candidate	Votes	%	±%
Conservative	Terence Henderson	1,489	44.1	+3.5
Labour	Graham Heaney	1,164	34.5	−1.8
Liberal Democrats	Alan Webb	725	21.5	−1.6
Majority		325	9.6	+5.3
Turnout		3,378	37.1	+10.8
Conservative gain from Labour		Swing		

Drayton and Farlington
Party	Candidate	Votes	%	±%
Conservative	Andrew Storey	2,124	46.7	−4.8
Liberal Democrats	Patrick Whittle	1,929	42.4	+10.1
Labour	Sonia Relf	500	11.0	−5.2
Majority		195	4.3	−14.9
Turnout		4,553	48.0	+11.4
Conservative hold		Swing		

Eastney and Craneswater
Party	Candidate	Votes	%	±%
Liberal Democrats	Anthony Martin	1,617	45.6	−3.0
Conservative	Luke Stubbs	1,340	37.8	+0.9
Labour	June Clarkson	330	9.3	−5.2
Green	David Lewis	260	7.3	+7.3
Majority		277	7.8	−3.9
Turnout		3,547	40.0	+11.4
Liberal Democrats hold		Swing		

Fratton
Party	Candidate	Votes	%	±%
Liberal Democrats	Philip Shaddock	1,412	53.1	+0.5
Conservative	Peter Ross	581	21.8	+0.3
Labour	John Attrill	390	14.7	−11.3
BNP	Timothy Pragnell	278	10.4	+10.4
Majority		831	31.3	+4.7
Turnout		2,661	29.3	+9.1
Liberal Democrats hold		Swing		

Hilsea
Party	Candidate	Votes	%	±%
Conservative	Jeremy Baler	1,555	51.3	+6.2
Labour	John Ferrett	798	26.3	−13.3
Liberal Democrats	Peter Kinsley	677	22.3	+7.0
Majority		757	25.0	+19.5
Turnout		3,030	33.1	+4.6
Conservative hold		Swing		

Milton
Party	Candidate	Votes	%	±%
Liberal Democrats	Alexander Bentley	1,687	52.8	+1.5
Conservative	Nigel Sizer	986	30.9	+3.6
Labour	Kenneth Ferrett	521	16.3	+4.0
Majority		701	21.9	−2.1
Turnout		3,194	36.8	+5.1
Liberal Democrats hold		Swing		

Nelson
Party	Candidate	Votes	%	±%
Labour	Patricia Bateman	1,024	39.9	−6.6
Conservative	Selina Corkerton	873	34.0	+0.2
Liberal Democrats	James Inkpen	670	26.1	+6.4
Majority		151	5.9	−6.8
Turnout		2,567	27.8	+7.3
Labour hold		Swing		

Paulsgrove
Party	Candidate	Votes	%	±%
Conservative	Michael Blake	946	40.3	+7.1
Labour	Andrew Silvester	939	40.0	−11.0
Liberal Democrats	Michael Price	463	19.7	+9.1
Majority		7	0.3	
Turnout		2,348	26.3	+6.6
Conservative gain from Labour		Swing		

St Jude
Party	Candidate	Votes	%	±%
Liberal Democrats	Hugh Mason	1,383	49.9	+4.6
Conservative	George Semmens	1,098	39.6	−2.7
Labour	Alwin Oliver	291	10.5	−1.9
Majority		285	10.3	+7.3
Turnout		2,772	35.5	+9.6
Liberal Democrats gain from Conservative		Swing		

St Thomas
Party	Candidate	Votes	%	±%
Liberal Democrats	Paula Riches	1,499	46.3	−4.6
Conservative	Stephen Wemyss	1,380	42.6	+7.2
Labour	Stephen Reid	358	11.1	−0.1
Majority		119	3.7	−11.8
Turnout		3,237	39.6	+11.3
Liberal Democrats gain from Conservative		Swing		

Preceded by 2003 Portsmouth City Council election	Portsmouth City Council elections	Succeeded by 2006 Portsmouth City Council election
