= 1999 Portsmouth City Council election =

1999 UK local government election

Elections to Portsmouth City Council were held on 6 May 1999. One third of the council was up for election and the Labour party stayed in overall control of the council.

After the election, the composition of the council was

- Labour 20
- Conservative 10
- Liberal Democrat 9

== Election result ==
Portsmouth local election result 1999
Party	Seats	Gains	Losses	Net gain/loss	Seats %	Votes %	Votes	+/−
Labour	6			-1	46.2			
Conservative	4			+2	30.8			
Liberal Democrats	3			-1	23.1			
