= Gerald Vernon-Jackson =

British Liberal Democrat politician

Cllr Gerald Vernon-Jackson CBE
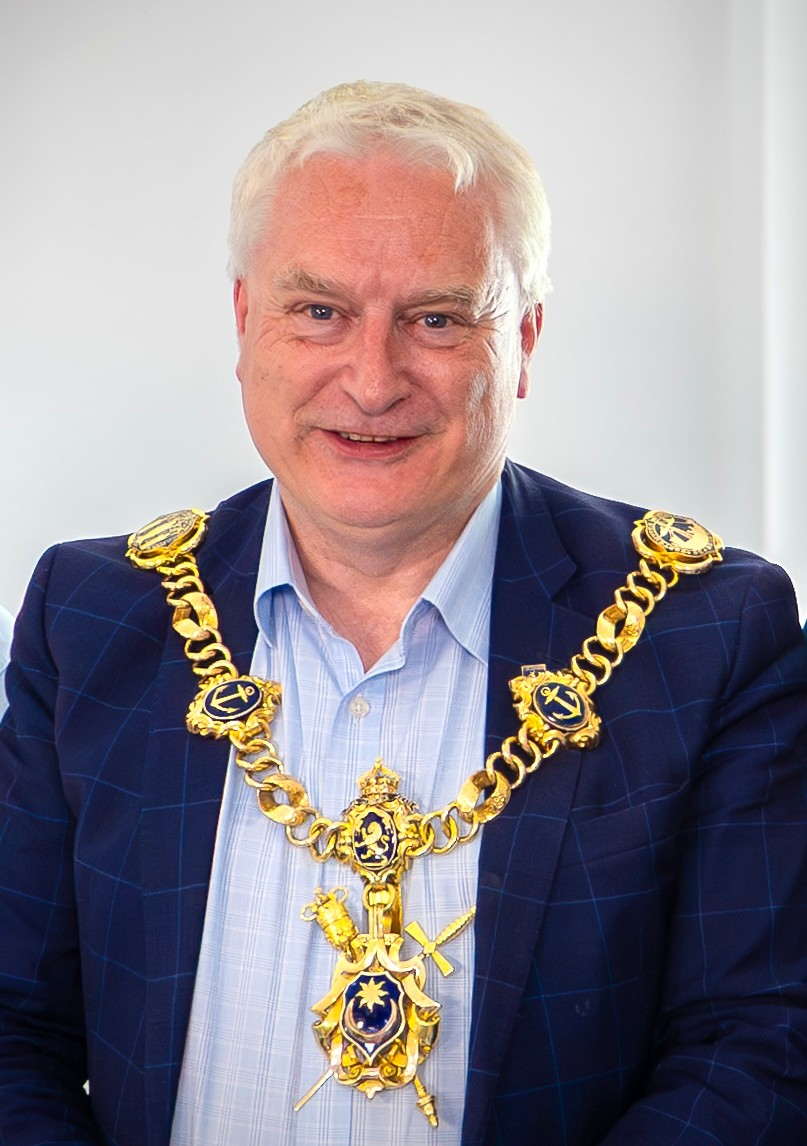
- Vernon-Jackson, 2025

Lord Mayor of Portsmouth
- In office 13 May 2025 – 19 May 2026
- Deputy: Abdul Kadir
- Preceded by: Jason Fazackarley
- Succeeded by: Abdul Kadir

Deputy Lord Mayor of Portsmouth
- In office 14 May 2024 – 13 May 2025
- Leader: Jason Fazackarley
- Preceded by: Jason Fazackarley
- Succeeded by: Abdul Kadir

Leader of Portsmouth City Council
- In office 15 May 2018 – 16 May 2023
- Preceded by: Donna Jones (Con)
- Succeeded by: Steve Pitt (Lib Dem)
- In office 22 June 2004 – 3 June 2014
- Preceded by: Phil Shaddock (Lib Dem)
- Succeeded by: Donna Jones (Con)

Chair of the English Liberal Democrats
- In office 20 February 2020 – December 2020
- Preceded by: Tahir Maher
- Succeeded by: Alison Rouse

Member of Portsmouth City Council for Milton Ward
- Incumbent
- Assumed office 5 May 2003
- Preceded by: Nigel Sizer (Lib Dem)

Personal details
- Born: January 10, 1962 (age 64) Lymington, Hampshire, England
- Party: Liberal Democrats
- Spouse: John Jarvis (died 2024)
- Education: University of Southampton, University of Liverpool
- Occupation: Politician
- Awards: Commander of the British Empire

Robert Gerald van Cortlandt Vernon-Jackson CBE (born 10 January 1962) is a Liberal Democrat politician in Portsmouth, England. He was the leader of Portsmouth City Council between 2004–2014 and 2018–2023, Lord Mayor of Portsmouth for the 2025-26 municipal year, and has served as a councillor for Milton Ward since 2003.

== Personal life ==
Vernon-Jackson was born in Hampshire, England. He is the son of Jean Vernon-Jackson MBE, former Chairman of Hampshire County Council and New Forest District Council, and a graduate of the University of Liverpool and University of Southampton with a bachelor's degree in History and a Master's in Social Care, respectively.

== Political career ==
Vernon-Jackson was an elected member of the Newbury Council from 1995 to 2003, where he served as Deputy Leader of the Liberal Democrats group. During this period, he served as Head of Office for Newbury MP David Rendel, and the Deputy Director of Campaigns of the Liberal Democrats. He would also contest the European Parliament Election, 1999 as 8th member of the Liberal Democrats list for the South East England constituency, ahead of future MEP Catherine Bearder. In 2003 he was elected to Milton Ward and assumed the Deputy Leadership of the Portsmouth Liberal Democrats Group. In 2004 he became Leader of the Council, a position he held until the 2014 council election. During this period, the Liberal Democrat administration was accused of covering up an independent report into allegations of sexual harassment made against then-MP Mike Hancock, Vernon-Jackson himself having dismissed the accusations as being motivated by possible financial gain.

In a letter to Michael Gove, minister in charge of no-deal Brexit planning, Vernon-Jackson accused the Government of underestimating the potential strife caused by a no-deal Brexit to Portsmouth docks.

During his time in opposition, Vernon-Jackson ran for the Portsmouth South constituency, first in 2015 to succeed Mike Hancock, and then again in 2017 in an attempt to retake the constituency for the Liberal Democrats, however was defeated in both attempts by Flick Drummond and Stephen Morgan, respectively. He stood again in Portsmouth South at the 2019 election, initially placed first in constituency polling against Labour and the Conservative candidates in a poll commissioned by the Liberal Democrats, however successive polling commissioned by the Liberal Democrats for the constituency would see Vernon-Jackson slip into third place, where he would ultimately poll on election day. In the 2016 Birthday Honours, Vernon-Jackson was appointed a Commander of the Most Excellent Order of the British Empire (CBE) for services to local government.

Following the 2023 local elections, Vernon-Jackson stepped down as Leader of the Portsmouth City Council. He was succeeded by Steve Pitt, his Ward Colleague for Milton.

From 2012 to 2017, Vernon-Jackson served as Vice Chair & Lib Dem Group Leader on the Local Government Association. Since January 2020, Vernon-Jackson has been a member of the Liberal Democrats Federal Board, and he was Chair of the English Liberal Democrats from February 2020 to December 2020.

Elected for a one year term of office on the 13th May 2025, Vernon-Jackson served as Lord Mayor of Portsmouth until 19 May 2026.

Political offices
Preceded by Donna Jones	Leader of Portsmouth City Council; 2018–2023	Succeeded by Steve Pitt
Preceded by Phil Shaddock	Leader of Portsmouth City Council; 2004–2014	Succeeded by Donna Jones
