= Nelson =

Nelson may refer to:

== Arts and entertainment ==
- Nelson (1918 film), a historical film directed by Maurice Elvey
- Nelson (1926 film), a historical film directed by Walter Summers
- Nelson (opera), an opera by Lennox Berkeley to a libretto by Alan Pryce-Jones
- Nelson (band), an American rock band
- Nelson, a 2010 album by Paolo Conte

== People ==
- Nelson (surname), including a list of people with the name
- Nelson (given name), including a list of people with the name
- Horatio Nelson, 1st Viscount Nelson (1758–1805), British admiral
- Nelson Mandela, the first black South African president
- Bishop of Nelson (disambiguation), a title sometimes referred to as "Nelson"

== Fictional characters ==
- Alice Nelson (The Brady Bunch), the housekeeper on the TV series The Brady Bunch
- Dave Nelson, a main character on the TV series NewsRadio
- Emma Nelson (Degrassi: The Next Generation), on the TV series Degrassi: The Next Generation
- Foggy Nelson, law partner of Matt Murdock in the Marvel Comic Universe
- Greg Nelson, on the American soap opera All My Children
- Harriman Nelson, on the TV series Voyage to the Bottom of the Sea
- Melody Nelson, from the concept album Histoire de Melody Nelson
- Tony Nelson, a main character on the TV series I Dream of Jeannie
- Nelson Muntz, on the television series The Simpsons
- Nelson Fox, a main character on the television series Mongrels

== Places ==
=== Australia ===
- Nelson, New South Wales
- Nelson, Victoria

=== Canada ===
- Nelson, British Columbia
- Nelson Parish, New Brunswick
- Nelson-Miramichi, New Brunswick, a former village, now part of Miramichi
- Nelson Beach, Saskatchewan
- Nelson Head, Northwest Territories

=== New Zealand ===
- Nelson, New Zealand, a city
- Nelson Lakes National Park, South Island

=== United Kingdom ===
- Nelson, Lancashire, England
- Nelson, Caerphilly, Wales

=== United States ===
- Nelson, Alabama
- Nelson, California
- Nelson, Georgia
- Nelson, Illinois
- Nelson, Minnesota
- Nelson, Missouri
- Nelson, Nebraska
- Nelson, Nevada
- Nelson, New Hampshire
- Nelson, New York
- Nelson, North Carolina
- Nelson, Oklahoma
- Nelson, West Virginia
- Nelson, Wisconsin, a village
- Nelson (town), Wisconsin, adjacent to the village
- Nelson, Virginia

=== Other places ===
- Nelson's Pillar, a former monument in Dublin, Ireland
- Nelson Airport (disambiguation)
- Nelson Bay (disambiguation)
- Cape Nelson (disambiguation)
- Nelson City (disambiguation)
- Nelson County (disambiguation)
- Nelson Dock (disambiguation)
- Nelson Farm (disambiguation)
- Fort Nelson (disambiguation)
- Nelson House (disambiguation)
- Nelson Island (disambiguation), including Nelsons Island
- Nelson Lake (disambiguation)
- Mount Nelson (disambiguation)
- Nelson Park (disambiguation)
- Port Nelson (disambiguation)
- Nelson River (disambiguation)
- Nelson station (disambiguation)
- Nelson Strait (disambiguation)
- Nelson Township (disambiguation)

== Electoral divisions/districts ==
- Nelson (federal electoral district), House of Commons of Canada, 1917–1935
- Nelson Province (Australia), Victorian Legislative Council, 1882–1940
- Nelson (provincial electoral district), Legislative Assembly of British Columbia, 1916–1928
- Nelson (New Zealand electorate), 1850–present
- Electoral division of Nelson (Northern Territory), Northern Territory Legislative Assembly, 1990–present
- Electoral division of Nelson (Tasmania), Tasmanian Legislative Council, 1999–present
- Electoral district of Nelson, Western Australian Legislative Assembly, 1890–1950
- Nelson and Colne (UK Parliament constituency), 1918–1983

== Schools ==
- Nelson College, a secondary school for boys in Nelson, New Zealand
- Nelson College for Girls, a secondary school for girls in Nelson, New Zealand
- Nelson Merry College (1890–1965) in Jefferson City, Tennessee, U.S.
- Nelson High School (disambiguation)

== Transportation ==
=== Ships ===
- HMS Nelson (1814), a British "first-rate" warship
- HMS Nelson (1876), a British armoured cruiser
- HMS Nelson (28), a British battleship
  - Nelson-class battleship
- USS Nelson (DD-623), an American Gleaves-class destroyer
- HMS Nelson, a stone frigate that partly forms the naval base HMNB Portsmouth

=== Other transportation ===
- Nelson (automobile), manufactured from 1917 to 1921
- Nelson Motor Truck Company, manufactured from 1918 to 1924
- Nelson-class (disambiguation), several classes of vehicles
- Nelson, the original name of the GWR 3031 Class train locomotives

== Sports ==
- Nelson (mascot), the current (male) dog mascot of Portsmouth F.C.
- Nelson (cricket), a term in the sport of cricket
- Nelson F.C., a football club based in Nelson, Lancashire
- Nelson hold, a type of grappling and wrestling hold
- Nelson Cricket Club, Lancashire, England
- Nelson cricket team, New Zealand
- Nelson Rugby Union, defunct New Zealand rugby team
  - Nelson Bays Rugby Union, its successor side
- Nelson Maple Leafs, defunct British Columbia ice hockey team
- Nelson Suburbs FC, New Zealand association football team

== Other uses ==
- Nelson (horse), one of George Washington's favorite horses
- Nelson (cat) Chief Mouser to the Cabinet Office from 1940 to 1946
- Nelson (typeface), a foundry type made by Ludwig & Mayer
- Nelson's Column, in Trafalgar Square, London
- Nelson Building, in Los Angeles, California

== See also ==
- Nelson Award (disambiguation)
- Admiral Nelson (disambiguation)
- Lord Nelson (disambiguation)
- Nelson's (disambiguation)
- Nelsons (disambiguation)
- Nelsen (disambiguation)
