= Nelson House =

Nelson House may refer to:

== Canada ==
- Nelson House, Manitoba

== United Kingdom ==
- Nelson House, London, Grade II* listed house

== United States ==
(by state then city or town)

- Nelson House (Latham, Alabama), listed on the National Register of Historic Places (NRHP) in Baldwin County, Alabama
- Nelson House (Helena-West Helena, Arkansas), NRHP-listed in Phillips County
- Nelson Ranch, Woodland, California, NRHP-listed in Yolo County
- John B. Nelson House, Port Penn, Delaware, NRHP-listed
- Wilhelmina Nelson House and Cabins, St. Charles, Idaho, NRHP-listed in Bear Lake County
- Daniel Nelson House and Barn, Oskaloosa, Iowa, NRHP-listed in Mahaska County
- F. P. Nelson House, Greencastle, Indiana, NRHP-listed in Putnam County
- Pollard-Nelson House, Logansport, Indiana, NRHP-listed in Cass County
- Nelson House (Lake Providence, Louisiana), NRHP-listed in East Carroll Parish
- Nelson Homestead, Crisfield, Maryland, NRHP-listed
- Nelson-Reardon-Kennard House, Abingdon, Maryland, NRHP-listed
- Henry Nelson House, New Market, Maryland, NRHP-listed
- Christina Nelson Three-Decker, Worcester, Massachusetts, NRHP-listed
- John R. Nelson House, Quincy, Massachusetts, NRHP-listed
- Knute Nelson House, Alexandria, Minnesota, listed on the NRHP in Minnesota
- Perry Nelson House, West Concord, Minnesota, NRHP-listed
- John Nelson Site, Willows, Mississippi, listed on the NRHP in Mississippi
- Nelson Tenement, Pascagoula, Mississippi, listed on the NRHP in Mississippi
- John C. Nelson House, Pascagoula, Mississippi, listed on the NRHP in Mississippi
- Thomas Nelson House (Boonville, Missouri), NRHP-listed
- Dr. J.A. Hay House, La Grange, Missouri, also known as Nelson House
- Nelson House (Washington Crossing, New Jersey), Washington Crossing State Park, NRHP-listed
- Thomas Nelson House (Peekskill, New York), NRHP-listed
- Luman Nelson House, Ravenna, Ohio, listed on the NRHP in Ohio
- Carl E. Nelson House, Salem, Oregon, NRHP-listed
- Otto W. and Ida L. Nelson House, Portland, Oregon, NRHP-listed
- John H. Nelson House, Fallowfield, Pennsylvania, NRHP-listed
- Maurice Nelson House, Rapid City, South Dakota, listed on the NRHP in South Dakota
- Nelson-Kirby House, Germantown, Tennessee, listed on the NRHP in Tennessee
- August M. and Mabel Jensen Nelson House, Sandy, Utah, listed on the NRHP in Utah
- Nels A. Nelson House, Sandy, Utah, listed on the NRHP in Utah
- Nelson-Beesley House, Salt Lake City, Utah, listed on the NRHP in Utah
- Nelson House (Nordland, Washington), listed on the NRHP in Jefferson County, Washington
- Charles F. Nelson House, Olalla, Washington, listed on the NRHP in Washington
- Nelson Hall, Stevens Point, Wisconsin, listed on the NRHP in Wisconsin
- Charles E. Nelson Sr. House, Waukesha, Wisconsin, listed on the NRHP in Waukesha County, Wisconsin

== See also ==
- John Nelson House (disambiguation)
- Thomas Nelson House (disambiguation)
- Nelson Farm (disambiguation)
- House (disambiguation)
- Nelson (disambiguation)
