= Nelson Lake =

Nelson Lake may refer to:

== Canada ==
- Nelson Lake (Colchester), Nova Scotia
- Nelson Lake (Halifax), Nova Scotia
- Nelson Lake (Hants), Nova Scotia
- Nelson Lake (Sudbury District), Ontario
- Nelson Lake (Thunder Bay District), Ontario
- Nelson Lake (Parry Sound District), Ontario
- Nelson Lake (Cedar Lake, Kenora District), Ontario
- Nelson Lake (Timiskaming District), Ontario
- Nelson Lake (Muskoka District), Ontario
- Nelson Lake (Gidley Township, Kenora District), Ontario

== United States ==
- Nelson Lake (Alaska)
- Nelson Lake (San Bernardino County), California
- Nelson Lake (Aitkin County, Minnesota)
- Nelson Lake (Douglas County, Minnesota)
- Nelson Lake, Goodhue County, Minnesota
- Nelson Lake (New York)
- Nelson Lake (Wisconsin)
