= Lord Nelson (disambiguation) =

Lord Nelson (1758–1805) was a British admiral.

Lord Nelson may also refer to:

== Places ==
- Lord Nelson Elementary School, Vancouver, British Columbia, Canada
- Lord Nelson Ground, a now-defunct stadium that was occupied by Millwall Rovers F.C. from 1886 to 1890
- Lord Nelson Hotel, the name of multiple establishments
- The Lord Nelson, Beverley, pub in the East Riding of Yorkshire, England

== People ==
- Earl Nelson, a count-rank title of the British peerage, also including Viscount Nelson, Baron Nelson
- Baron Nelson of Stafford, a title in the British peerage
- Lord Nelson (rapper), lead vocalist for the rap metal band Stuck Mojo
- Lord Nelson (calypsonian)
- Lord Nelson Roney (1853–1944), carpenter and contractor in Eugene, Oregon
- Ernest Rutherford, Lord Rutherford of Nelson (1871–1937), New Zealand physicist

== Transportation and vehicles ==
- List of ships named Lord Nelson
- Lord Nelson-class battleship
- SR Lord Nelson class, a steam locomotive
- Lord Nelson 41, an American sailboat design

== Other uses ==
- Lord Nelson mass, Missa in Angustiis written by Joseph Haydn

== See also ==
- Admiral Lord Nelson School, Portsmouth, Hampshire, England
- Horatio Nelson (disambiguation)
- Monuments and memorials to Horatio Nelson, 1st Viscount Nelson
- Nelson (surname)
- Lady Nelson (disambiguation)
- Earl Nelson (disambiguation)
- Admiral Nelson (disambiguation)
- Horatio Nelson (disambiguation)
- Lord (disambiguation)
- Nelson (disambiguation)
