= Nelson High School =

Nelson High School can refer to:

- Nelson High School (Ontario), in Burlington, Ontario, Canada
- Byron Nelson High School, in Trophy Club, Texas, USA
- Susan Nelson High School, in Temecula Valley Unified School District, Riverside County, California, USA
- Thomas Nelson High School, in Bardstown, Kentucky, USA
- Nelson County High School (Kentucky), also in Bardstown, Kentucky, USA
- Nelson County High School (Virginia), in Lovingston, Virginia, USA

== See also ==
- Fort Nelson Secondary School, Fort Nelson, British Columbia, Canada
- Nelson College, a secondary school for boys in Nelson, New Zealand
- Nelson College for Girls, a secondary school for girls in Nelson, New Zealand
- Nelson Intermediate School, South Nelson, Nelson, South Island, New Zealand; serving grades 7&8
- Walton High School, Nelson, Lancashire, England, UK; formerly named Nelson Municipal Secondary School
- Nelson County High School (disambiguation)
- Nelson (disambiguation)
