= Nelson County High School =

Nelson County High School can refer to either of the following high schools:

- Nelson County High School (Kentucky) in Bardstown, Kentucky, USA
- Nelson County High School (Virginia) in Lovingston, Virginia, USA

== See also ==
- Nelson High School (disambiguation)
- Nelson County (disambiguation)
- Nelson (disambiguation)
