= Lady Nelson =

Lady Nelson may refer to:

- Frances Nelson (1758–1831), wife of British admiral Horatio Nelson
- HMS Lady Nelson (1798), Royal Navy survey vessel in Australian waters
- RMS Lady Nelson, Canadian ocean liner (1928–1968)
- Lady Nelson was launched in Bermuda in 1801. She was lost on 15 November 1804 at the Galapagos while whaling.

== See also ==
- Nelson (surname)
- Lord Nelson (disambiguation)
- Nelson (disambiguation)
- Lady (disambiguation)
