= Admiral Nelson (disambiguation) =

Horatio Nelson, 1st Viscount Nelson (1758–1805) was a Royal Navy vice admiral. Admiral Nelson may also refer to:

- Charles P. Nelson (admiral) (1877–1935), U.S. Navy rear admiral
- Edward Nelson Jr. (1931–2018), U.S. Coast Guard rear admiral
- Richard A. Nelson (born 1941), U.S. Navy vice admiral
- Robert T. Nelson (born 1936), U.S. Coast Guard vice admiral
- William T. Nelson (1908–1994), U.S. Navy rear admiral

== See also ==
- Admiral Lord Nelson School, Portsmouth, Hampshire, England
- Philip Nelson-Ward (1866–1937), British Royal Navy admiral
- Monuments and memorials to Horatio Nelson, 1st Viscount Nelson
- Nelson (surname)
- General Nelson (disambiguation)
- Horatio Nelson (disambiguation)
- Lord Nelson (disambiguation)
- Admiral (disambiguation)
- Nelson (disambiguation)
