= Nelsson =

Nelsson is a surname. Notable people with the surname include:

- Anders Nelsson (born 1946), actor and musician in the 1960s Hong Kong music scene
- Putte Nelsson (born 1971), Swedish pianist and songwriter
- Victor Nelsson (born 1998), Danish professional footballer
- Woldemar Nelsson (1938–2006), Russian conductor

== See also ==
- Nelsen (disambiguation)
- Nelson (disambiguation)
