= John Nelson House =

John Nelson House may refer to:

in the United States

(by state, then city)

- John B. Nelson House, Port Penn, Delaware, listed on the National Register of Historic Places (NRHP)
- John R. Nelson House, Quincy, Massachusetts, NRHP-listed
- John Nelson Site, Willows, Mississippi, listed on the NRHP in Claiborne County, Mississippi
- John C. Nelson House, Pascagoula, Mississippi, listed on the NRHP in Jackson County, Mississippi
- John H. Nelson House, Fallowfield, Pennsylvania, NRHP-listed
