= Thomas Nelson House =

Thomas Nelson House may refer to:

- Thomas Nelson House (Boonville, Missouri), listed on the NRHP in Missouri
- Thomas Nelson House (Peekskill, New York), listed on the NRHP in New York
- Thomas Nelson House (Yorktown, Virginia), contributing property to Colonial National Historical Park

== See also ==
- Nelson House (disambiguation)
