= Nielson (automobile) =

Defunct American motor vehicle manufacturer

Nielson Motor Car Company
- Company type: Automobile manufacturer
- Founded: 1906; 120 years ago
- Founder: E. A. Nielson
- Defunct: 1907; 119 years ago
- Headquarters: Detroit, Michigan, United States
- Products: Automobiles

The Nielson was an automobile built in Detroit, Michigan by the Nielson Motor Car Company in 1907.

== History ==
The Nielson was built as a two-seater runabout equipped with a single-cylinder 12 hp air-cooled engine. The engine was located behind the seat, and was equipped with a friction transmission and double-chain drive. The vehicle was priced at $800, equivalent to $28,667 in 2025. E. A .Nielson drove his runabout to New York City and displayed it at the Selzer Garage.

Automotive historians have speculated that E .A. Nielson may have been Emil A. Nelson who had previously worked for Packard and who would do design work for Hupmobile beginning in 1908.
