= Nelsons =

Nelsons may refer to:

- Andris Nelsons (born 1978), classical music conductor
- Nelsons (homeopathy), an international company based in London

== See also ==
- Nelson's Island, Alexandria, Egypt
- Nelson (disambiguation)
