= Diocese of Nelson =

Diocese of Nelson may refer to:

- Anglican Diocese of Nelson, South Island, New Zealand (founded 1858)
- Roman Catholic Diocese of Nelson, British Columbia, Canada (founded 1936)

== See also ==
- Bishop of Nelson (disambiguation)
- Nelson (disambiguation)
