= Horatio Nelson (disambiguation) =

Horatio Nelson, 1st Viscount Nelson (1758–1805) was a British Admiral.

Horatio Nelson may also refer to:

- Horatio Nelson, 3rd Earl Nelson (1823–1913), 1st Viscount's nephew
- Horatio Admiral Nelson (1838–1905), American-born merchant, manufacturer and political figure in Quebec
- Horatio Nelson Jackson (1872–1955), Canadian-American physician, Army medical officer, businessman, and automobile pioneer.
- Horatio Nelson (horse) (2003–2006), racehorse

== See also ==
- Monuments and memorials to Horatio Nelson, 1st Viscount Nelson
- Admiral Nelson (disambiguation)
- Lord Nelson (disambiguation)
- Horatio (disambiguation)
- Nelson (disambiguation)
