= Fallowfield (disambiguation) =

Fallowfield a suburb of the city of Manchester, England.

Fallowfield may also refer to:

== Places ==
- Fallowfield, Ottawa, a neighbourhood of Ottawa, Canada
- Fallowfield Township, Washington County, Pennsylvania, US
- Fallowfield, Pennsylvania, an unincorporated community, US
- Fallowfield Stadium, athletics stadium and velodrome in Fallowfield, Manchester, England. Now demolished and non-existent

== People ==
- Bill Fallowfield, British rugby league football coach and administrator
- Ryan Fallowfield, English footballer
