= Nelson River (disambiguation) =

Nelson River is large river in Manitoba, Canada, flowing into the Hudson Bay.

Nelson River may also refer to:

- Nelson River (Saint-Charles River), a tributary of the Saint-Charles River in Quebec, Canada
- Fort Nelson River, in British Columbia, Canada

== See also ==
- Nelson (disambiguation)
- River Nelson, American hip-hop artist
