= Camp Nelson =

Camp Nelson can refer to:

- Camp Nelson, California, U.S.
- Camp Nelson Confederate Cemetery in Lonoke County, Arkansas, U.S.
- Camp Nelson National Cemetery in Jessamine County, Kentucky, U.S.
- Camp Nelson National Monument in Jessamine County, Kentucky, U.S.

== See also ==
- Fort Nelson (disambiguation)
