= Milton, Portsmouth =

Neighbourhood of Portsmouth, Hampshire, England

Coordinates: 50.794820°N 1.058790°W

Milton
- Suburb
- Location within Hampshire
- Population: 14,300
- OS grid reference: SZ 66433 99895
- Unitary authority: Portsmouth
- Ceremonial county: Hampshire
- Region: South East
- Country: England
- Sovereign state: United Kingdom
- Post town: SOUTHSEA
- Postcode district: PO4
- Dialling code: 023
- Police: Hampshire and Isle of Wight
- Fire: Hampshire and Isle of Wight
- Ambulance: South Central
- UK Parliament: Portsmouth South

Milton is a residential area of the English city of Portsmouth, Hampshire, England, on the south eastern side of Portsea Island. Milton is bordered on the eastern coast of Portsea Island by Langstone Harbour, with Eastney to the south-east, Southsea to the south-west, Baffins to the north and Fratton to the north-west.

The name 'Milton' has Saxon origins, originally Middletūn meaning "middle settlement", as it was located midway between the larger Saxon village of Froddington (now Fratton) and Eastney. In the post-1066 Norman era, Milton was known as Middleton. It is likely that Middleton's name has been verbally contracted by local dialects to "Milton" over centuries.

Milton was originally a small village on Portsea Island, surrounded by arable and garden farmland. In 1904, Portsmouth's boundaries were expanded to cover all of Portsea Island, with Milton becoming part of Portsmouth.

Politically, Milton is represented as Milton Ward in Portsmouth City Council. Milton Ward is part of the Portsmouth South UK Parliament Constituency. The population of the Milton Ward of Portsmouth at the 2021 Census was 14,300.

Milton is now a built up area made up of original Victorian properties and more modern houses. It has many original public houses still open. The area has a lot of green spaces still and is in walking distance to the sea, surrounded by many parks and Milton Common. There are many local businesses such as shops and restaurants within walking distance. House prices are very high and have steadily increased as it is one of the most desirable areas to live in Portsmouth.

== History ==
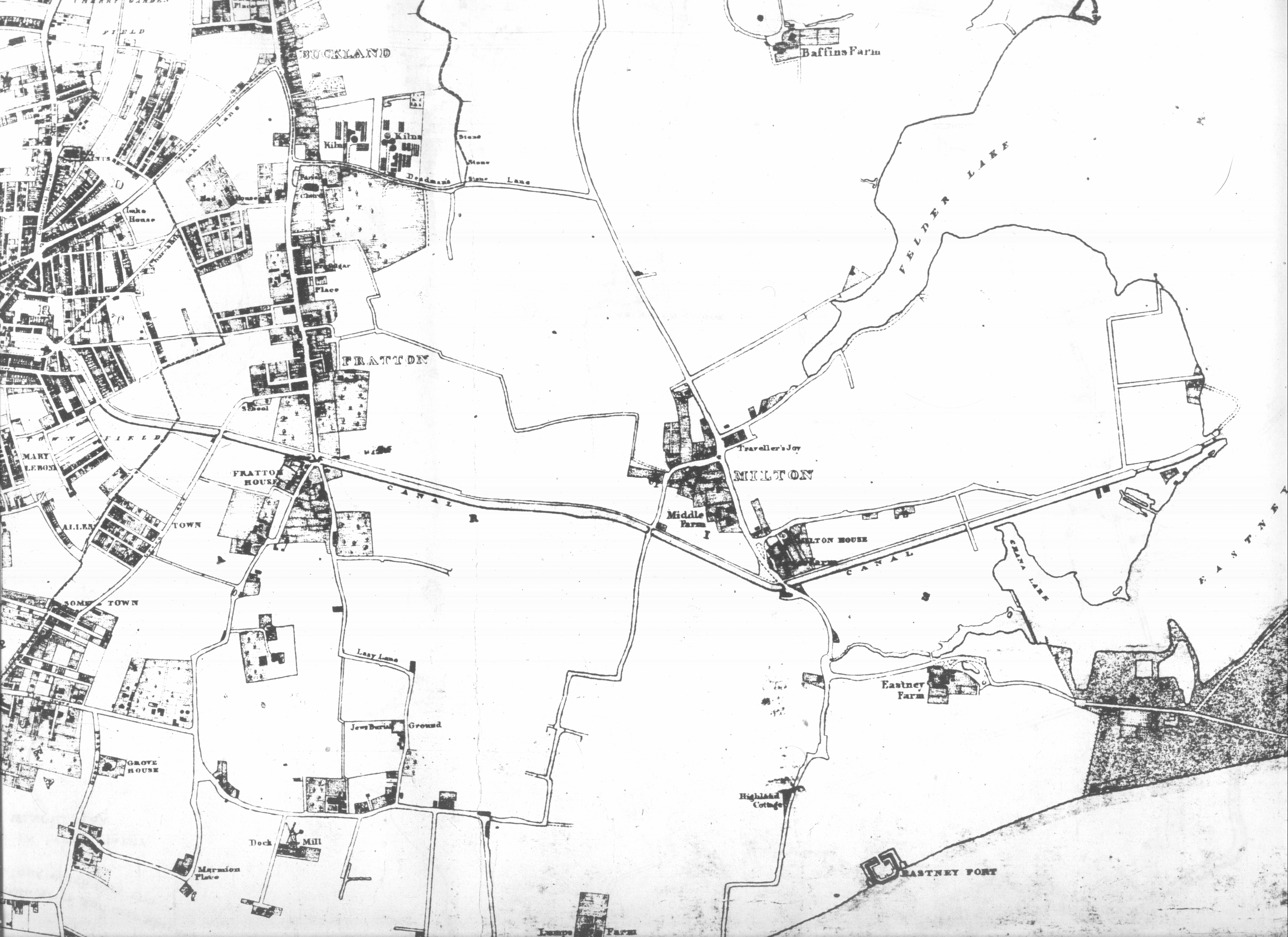
A map of Milton in 1833, featuring the route of the Portsmouth and Arundel Canal

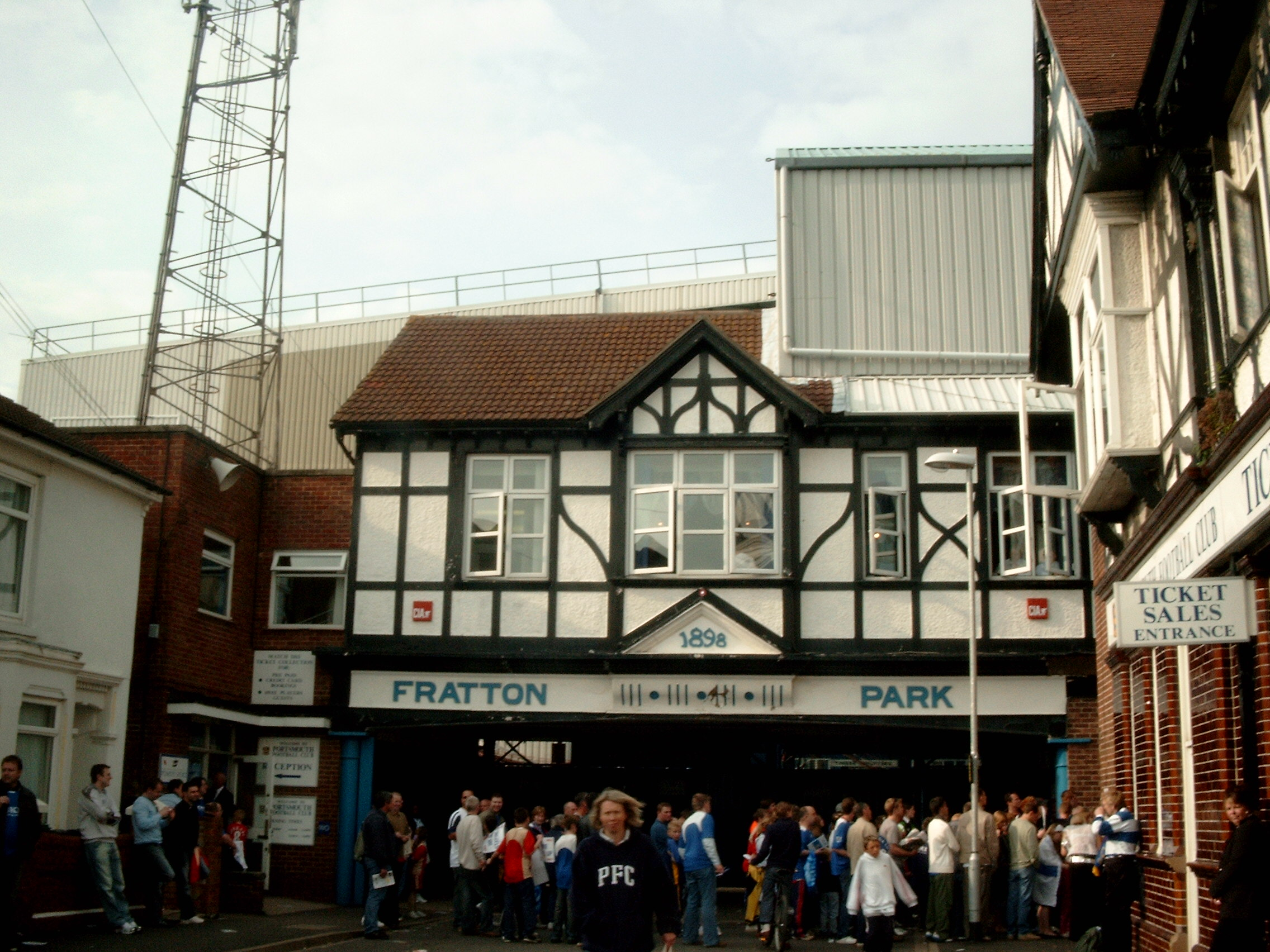
Portsmouth FC's Fratton Park stadium in Frogmore Road, Milton, Portsmouth

On the south eastern side of Portsea Island, Milton still retains somewhat of a village ambience and boasts two large public parks; Milton Park and Bransbury Park, both of which were former farms. Milton was originally a small village, surrounded by arable and market garden farmland until it was swallowed up by the expansion of Portsmouth across Portsea Island in the late 19th and early 20th centuries. A canal was built through Milton in the early 19th century, forming part of the Portsmouth and Arundel Canal.

Today's Milton Park now occupies farmland previously known as Purnell Farm, which became part of the Milton Farm estate owned by the Goldsmith family in 1808. Purnell Farm was then later renamed Middle Farm by the Goldsmith's. In 1911, James Goldsmith died and his Milton Farm estate was split up. The Corporation of Portsmouth bought Middle Farm on 28 May 1912, to reopen it as Milton Park on 11 July 1923. Some members of the Goldsmith family are buried just across the road from Milton Park in St James churchyard on Milton Road. One of the original Middle Farm buildings remains; the thatched barn, which has been extended and is now the home of the Portsmouth Players amateur dramatic society.

Milton Locks, in the far east of Milton at the end of the eponymous Locksway Road, is located at the Langstone Harbour entrance of the abandoned Portsmouth and Arundel Canal which began operations in 1822. Little now remains of the old lock gates, wooden as they were, although the infrastructure is still evident. There are several pubs located along the former canal path, partly delineating its route towards Landport where it ended at the eponymously named Arundel Street. Traces of the canal survive further into central Portsmouth, as the railway line from Fratton to Portsmouth and Southsea railway station, runs along the earlier canal bed. This can be most easily seen from a street called Canal Walk, just off Fratton Bridge.

Part of the former Portsmouth and Arundel Canal was located directly south of Middle Farm (later Milton Park) which was built across Portsea Island to Landport. When the canal closed in the middle of the nineteenth century, the section in Milton was filled in to form a new main road along the route of the canal, and was named Goldsmith Avenue after the local land owning Goldsmith family.

Bransbury Park was previously Bransbury Farm up to 1911, part of the Goldsmith's estate until it was purchased by Portsmouth council. Bransbury Farm and surrounding marshland at Eastney were drained and combined to form Bransbury Park. Presently, Bransbury Park offers squash and netball courts as well as several football pitches for local Sunday League clubs and schools football. There is also a permanent miniature railway track located in the centre of Bransbury Park run by Portsmouth Model Engineering Society members. In more recent years, a small skatepark has been erected at the eastern end of Bransbury Park.

The parade of shops in Eastney Road opposite Bransbury Park is popularly known as "Milton Market"; the local sub-post office's name is also officially "Milton Market". A traditional family-owned confectionery shop named "Gilbert's" has been trading in Milton Market since it first opened over a century ago.

St James' Hospital, an institution for the treatment of mental health, first opened in 1879 on what was then called Asylum Road, now named Locksway Road. Until the 1960s, St James' Hospital possessed a small Home Farm, with orchards, cornfields and a piggery. Nowadays largely built on and with the former cornfields now occupied by the Langstone Campus of the University of Portsmouth, the remaining hospital grounds are still quite extensive and include a cricket field complete with clubhouse. Another part of the grounds has been secured as a third public park for the area, St James' Green, on which community events are held and further features such as a children's Nature Trail are to be incorporated.

In 1884, an infectious diseases hospital named Priorsdean opened near the village. Priorsdean later became part of St Mary's Hospital, one of the city's main hospitals which opened at Milton in 1898. In the late 1990s, the eastern section of St Mary's Hospital (which incorporated Priorsdean) was redeveloped and became Miltoncross Academy school and a small housing development. In the early 2000s, the majority of the remaining St Mary's Hospital site was also redeveloped into housing, with many of St Mary's hospital services transferring to Queen Alexandra Hospital in Cosham, Portsmouth. St Mary's Hospital continues today as the St Mary's NHS Treatment Centre, which has a minor injuries and illnesses unit.

In the autumn of 1898, Sir John Brickwood, owner of the Portsmouth-based Brickwood Brewery, and five fellow directors of the "Portsmouth Football & Athletic Company" (now Portsmouth F.C.) purchased a potato field, measuring four-and-a-half acres from Milton Farm, owned by the Goldsmith farming family. During 1899, the early Portsmouth Football Club built their modest football ground and curiously named it Fratton Park, despite the stadium's true location in Milton, not Fratton. The "Fratton Park" name was chosen to persuade potential new supporters that the new "Fratton Park" football ground (in Milton) was nearer to Fratton railway station (in Fratton) than its actual walking distance of one mile. Fratton Park was completed and first opened to the public on 15 August 1899. The eastern 'end' of Fratton Park became known as 'The Milton End', named after the Milton village in which Fratton Park is actually built.

Today, some modern-day Portsmouth F.C. supporters erroneously believe that Fratton Park is in Portsmouth's Fratton area, literally because of the stadium's name and also lacking the correct facts of Milton's long history. A political map of Portsmouth clearly defines the border between the Fratton and Milton areas with a line drawn from Fratton Bridge, along the Portsmouth Direct line railway up to St. Mary's Bridge. Fratton is located north of the line with Milton to the south. Fratton Park is south of the railway line, and thus is in Milton. This fact can also be proven further as Fratton Park has a Milton-based PO4 8RA postal code address (Fratton and Portsmouth city centre has a "PO1" postal code). A further fact is that Fratton Park lies within the Milton Ward electoral district for Portsmouth City Council and national level parliamentary elections.

On the eastern edge of Portsea Island bordering Langstone Harbour, is an area now known as Milton Common, formerly a tidal inlet known as Milton Lake (and even earlier, "Felder Lake" from which the current Velder Avenue's name is derived). Milton Common is reclaimed land, formed between 1962 and 1970 when a chalk and clay bund was built across the mouth of the lake and the confined area was progressively drained and in-filled with domestic refuse and other waste. This was later capped and grassed over to form Milton Common.

Milton Common was not originally planned to be a wild open space. In 1967, Hampshire County Council had planned for Milton Lake to be filled in and become the site of a major dual carriageway trunkroad (or "M276" motorway) that would have cut east–west through Portsea Island and connect to the M275 to form a loop. This trunk road was planned to branch off the Eastern Road in Milton, along the newly built Milton Common shoreline to Milton Locks, then through Locksway Road, Goldsmith Avenue and connect to Winston Churchill Avenue in central Portsmouth. Fortunately for the residents of Milton and other areas, the over-ambitious and hugely disruptive road plans were cancelled in 1976. Some parts of the scheme were approved, noticeably at Winston Churchill Avenue in Somerstown and at Victoria Road North near Fratton Bridge, where overly large trunk road roundabout intersections were built and awaited connection to the Milton section of the road scheme, which was never built.

The perimeter of the former Milton Lake can still be traced on a modern map, as the A2030 Eastern Road borders it to the north and Moorings Way road to the south. Milton Common has an informal network of footpaths with the eastern footpath running alongside Langstone Harbour forming part of the Solent Way. There are three freshwater lakes; Frog Lake, Duck Lake and Swan Lake, home to many aquatic and avian species. The land is still settling and the cavities of Milton Common make ideal homes for foxes and other wildlife.

Moorings Way - the road bounding the southern edge of Milton Common - was so called because of the large number of houseboats that were moored alongside the edge of the former Milton Lake. Many people displaced in the 1940s Blitz found refuge along the north shore of Eastney Lake and round into Milton Lake, almost a shanty town. Mostly consisting of makeshift houseboats, converted railway carriages and fisherman huts, many of these homes, lacking the basic amenities of electricity and plumbed water supplies, survived into the 1960s until they were cleared.

== Governance ==
Milton is a Portsmouth City Council ward within the Portsmouth South parliamentary constituency. It was formed for the 2002 Portsmouth City Council election as the successor of the pre-2002 Milton ward.

Election	Councillor	Councillor	Councillor
2002	Caroline Scott (Lib Dem)	Alexander Bentley (Lib Dem)	Nigel Sizer (Lib Dem)
2003	Caroline Scott (Lib Dem)	Alexander Bentley (Lib Dem)	Gerald Vernon-Jackson (Lib Dem)
2004	Caroline Scott (Lib Dem)	Alexander Bentley (Lib Dem)	Gerald Vernon-Jackson (Lib Dem)
2006	Caroline Scott (Lib Dem)	Alexander Bentley (Lib Dem)	Gerald Vernon-Jackson (Lib Dem)
2007	Caroline Scott (Lib Dem)	Alexander Bentley (Lib Dem)	Gerald Vernon-Jackson (Lib Dem)
2008	Caroline Scott (Lib Dem)	Sarah Dinenage (Con)	Gerald Vernon-Jackson (Lib Dem)
2010	Caroline Scott (Lib Dem)	Sarah Dinenage (Con)	Gerald Vernon-Jackson (Lib Dem)
2011	Caroline Scott (Lib Dem)	Sarah Dinenage (Con)	Gerald Vernon-Jackson (Lib Dem)
2011	Caroline Scott (Lib Dem)	Sarah Dinenage (Lib Dem)	Gerald Vernon-Jackson (Lib Dem)
2012	Caroline Scott (Lib Dem)	Will Purvis (Lib Dem)	Gerald Vernon-Jackson (Lib Dem)
2014	Ben Dowling (Lib Dem)	Will Purvis (Lib Dem)	Gerald Vernon-Jackson (Lib Dem)
2015	Ben Dowling (Lib Dem)	Will Purvis (Lib Dem)	Gerald Vernon-Jackson (Lib Dem)
2016	Ben Dowling (Lib Dem)	Will Purvis (Lib Dem)	Gerald Vernon-Jackson (Lib Dem)
2018	Ben Dowling (Lib Dem)	Will Purvis (Lib Dem)	Gerald Vernon-Jackson (Lib Dem)
2019	Ben Dowling (Lib Dem)	Will Purvis (Lib Dem)	Gerald Vernon-Jackson (Lib Dem)

indicates seat up for election.
