= Bishop of Nelson =

Bishop of Nelson may refer to:

- The ordinary of the Anglican Diocese of Nelson (founded 1858)
- The ordinary of the Roman Catholic Diocese of Nelson (founded 1936)

== See also ==
- Diocese of Nelson (disambiguation)
- Nelson (disambiguation)
