= Nelson class =

Nelson class may refer to:

- Lord Nelson-class battleship, a class of two pre-Dreadnought battleships
- Nelson-class battleship, a class of two battleships built between the two World Wars
- SR Lord Nelson-class steam locomotive

== See also ==
- Class (disambiguation)
- Nelson (disambiguation)
