= Nelson station =

Nelson station or Nelson Station may refer to:

in Canada

- Nelson Canadian Pacific railway station

in England

- Nelson railway station in Lancashire,
- Nelson Dock railway station, a former station on the Liverpool Overhead Railway

in the United States

- Nelson, California, formerly known as Nelson Station
- Nelson Dewey Generating Station, Cassville, Wisconsin

== See also ==
- List of Nelson railway stations, for any of the stations on the Nelson Section in Tasman district, New Zealand
