= Nelson Award =

Nelson Award may refer to:

- Katherine Greacen Nelson Award in Geology of the Weis Earth Science Museum, named for geologist Katherine Greacen Nelson
- Byron Nelson Award in golf, named for golfer Byron Nelson
  - Byron Nelson Award (PGA Tour), lowest adjusted scoring average for the year in golf
  - Byron Nelson Award (Champions Tour), lowest scoring average for the year in golf

== See also ==
- Award (disambiguation)
- Nelson (disambiguation)
