= Earl Nelson (disambiguation) =

Earl Nelson is a title of Trafalgar and of Merton in the County of Surrey, United Kingdom.

Earl Nelson may also refer to:

- Earl Nelson (singer) (1928–2008), part of the original soul music duo of Bob & Earl
- Earl E. Nelson (1937–2016), Michigan politician
- Ben Nelson (Earl Benjamin Nelson, born 1941), U.S. senator from Nebraska

== See also ==
- Earle Nelson (1897–1928), serial killer
- Lord Nelson (disambiguation)
