= Nelson Island =

Nelson Island, Nelson's Island or Nelsons Island may refer to:

- Nelson Island (Alaska)
- Nelsons Island, in the Chagos Archipelago
- Nelson Island (South Shetland Islands)
- Nelson Island (Trinidad and Tobago)
- Nelson Island (British Columbia)
- Nelson's Island, an island in Abu Qir Bay, Egypt
- Nelson Island (Talbot County, Maryland), an island of Maryland
- Nelson Island (Montana), an island in the Missouri River portion of Montana

== See also ==
- Nelson Rock
