= Nelson County =

Nelson County may refer to:

== Places ==
- Nelson County, Western Australia, Australia
- Nelson County, Kentucky, U.S., originally Nelson County, Virginia (1784–92)
- Nelson County, North Dakota, U.S.
- Nelson County, Virginia, U.S. (established 1807)

== See also ==
- Nelson County High School (disambiguation)
- County (disambiguation)
- Nelson (disambiguation)
