= Nelson Strait =

Nelson Strait is the name of a waterway and can refer to:

- Nelson Strait (South Shetland Islands), a sea passage between Robert and Nelson Islands in South Shetland, Antarctica
- Nelson Strait (Chile), a sea passage between islands of the Chilean Archipelago

== See also ==
- Nelson Channel, a sea passage in the South Sandwich Islands, previously known as "Nelson Strait"
