= Cape Nelson =

Cape Nelson may refer to:

- Cape Nelson (Papua New Guinea), in Oro Province
- the cape of that name in Cape Nelson State Park, Victoria, Australia
