= Nelson Lake (Douglas County, Minnesota) =

Lake in the state of Minnesota, United States

- Location within Minnesota
- Location: Douglas County, Minnesota
- Coordinates: 45°56′38″N 95°33′37″W
- Type: lake

Nelson Lake is a lake in Douglas County, in the U.S. state of Minnesota.

Nelson Lake was named for O. W. Nelson, a pioneer farmer who settled there.

== See also ==
- List of lakes in Minnesota
