= Nelson Lake (Aitkin County, Minnesota) =

Lake in the state of Minnesota, United States

- Location within Minnesota
- Location: Aitkin County, Minnesota
- Coordinates: 46°37′22″N 93°5′41″W
- Type: lake

Nelson Lake is a lake in Aitkin County, Minnesota, in the United States. It was named for M. Nelson, who owned land near the lake.

== See also ==
- List of lakes in Minnesota
