= Fort Nelson =

Fort Nelson may refer to:

== Canada ==
- Fort Nelson, British Columbia, a town
- Fort Nelson River, British Columbia
- Fort Nelson (Manitoba) (1670–1713), an early fur trading post at the mouth of the Nelson River and the first headquarters of the Hudson's Bay Company

== United Kingdom ==
- Fort Nelson, Hampshire, England (built 1860–1867), a Palmerston Fort and present-day museum

== United States ==
- Fort Nelson (Kentucky), built in 1781
- Fort Nelson (Virginia), first constructed in 1776

== See also ==
- Camp Nelson (disambiguation)
