= Nelson Lake (Colchester) =

Lake in Nova Scotia, Canada

Nelson Lake Colchester
- Location within Nova Scotia
- Location: Colchester County, Nova Scotia
- Coordinates: 45.2759252°N 62.7261108°W
- Basin countries: Canada

Nelson Lake Colchester is a lake of Colchester County, in Nova Scotia, Canada.

== See also ==
- List of lakes in Nova Scotia
