= Nelson Dock =

Nelson Dock can refer to a number of places:

- Nelson Dock, Liverpool, dock on the River Mersey and part of the Port of Liverpool
- Nelson Dock, Rotherhithe, dock on the River Thames in London

- Nelson Dock Pier, pier on Nelson Dock
