= Nelson Park =

Nelson Park may refer to:

- Nelson Park, Kent, United Kingdom
- Nelson Park, Napier, a cricket ground in Napier
- Nelson Park Township, Marshall County, Minnesota, United States
- Nelson Park, Vancouver, Canada
