= Nelson Lake (Halifax) =

Lake in Nova Scotia, Canada

Nelson Lake Halifax
- Location within Nova Scotia
- Location: Halifax Regional Municipality, Nova Scotia
- Coordinates: 44.723512°N 63.427699°W
- Basin countries: Canada

Nelson Lake Halifax is a lake of Halifax Regional Municipality, lying northeast of Dartmouth City in Nova Scotia, Canada.

== See also ==
- List of lakes in Nova Scotia
