= Thomas Nelson High School =

Public school in Nelson County, Kentucky

Coordinates: 37.847291°N 85.506721°W

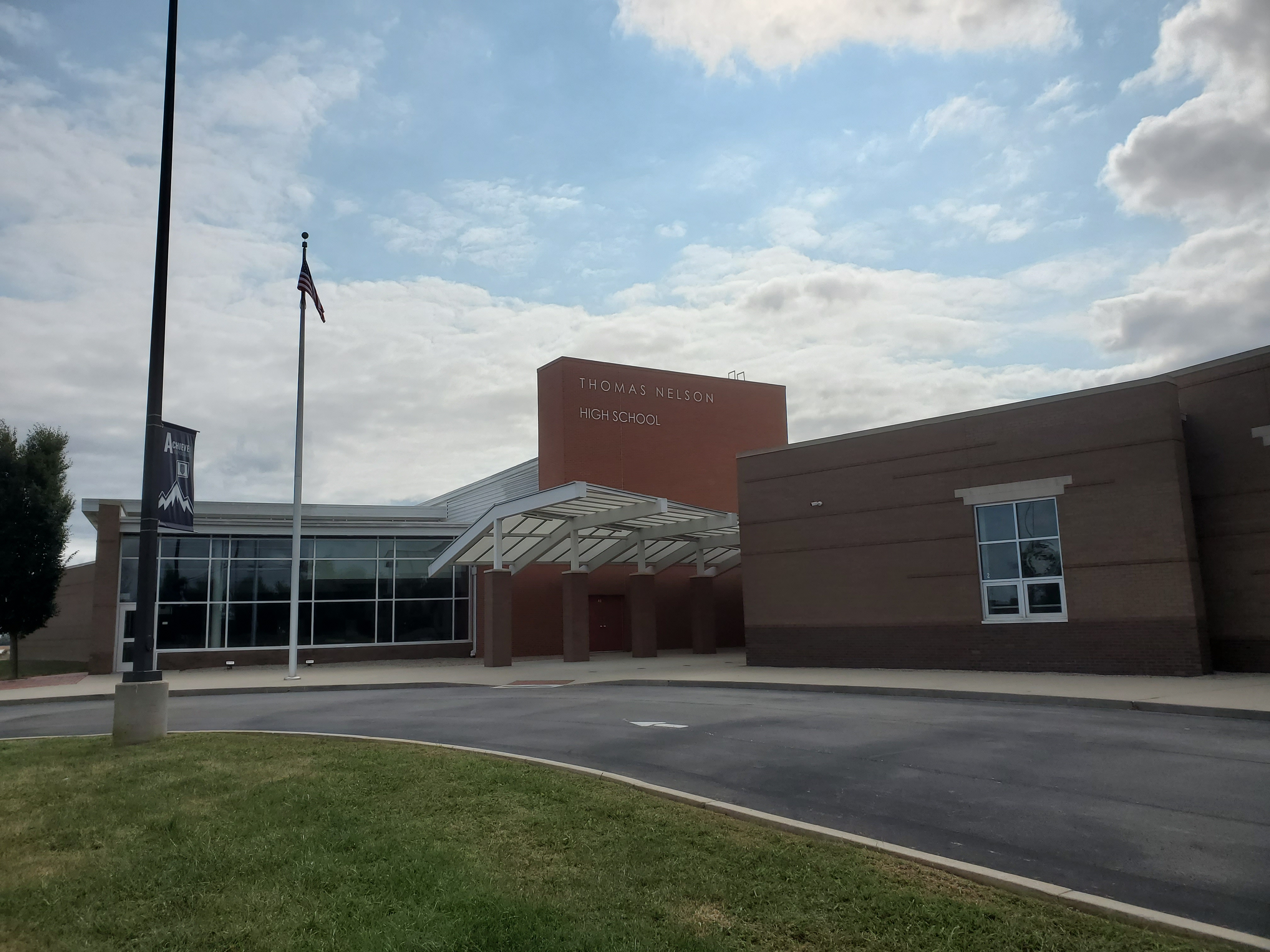
- The school's main entrance in 2020

Location
- 150 Generals Blvd. Bardstown, Kentucky 40004; United States

Information
- School type: Public
- Motto: College, Career, Citizenship
- Founded: 2012
- School district: Nelson County School District
- Principal: Curt Merrifield
- Teaching staff: 29.00 (FTE)
- Grades: 9–12
- Enrollment: 643 (2023–2024)
- Student to teacher ratio: 22.17
- Campus: Exurban
- Area: Nelson County, Kentucky
- Colors: Navy, gray, white
- Mascot: General
- Nickname: Generals
- Feeder schools: Boston School; New Haven School; Old Kentucky Home Middle School; Bloomfield Middle
- Website: tnhs.nelson.kyschools.us

Thomas Nelson High School is a public high school located in an unincorporated area of Nelson County, Kentucky that has a Bardstown mailing address. Operated by the Nelson County School District and named after American Revolution figure Thomas Nelson, Jr., it was opened in August 2012 to alleviate overcrowding at what had been the district's only regular high school, Nelson County High School.

Although the school opened in 2012, it did not graduate its first students until 2014. In its first school year of 2012–13, only 9th through 11th grades attended.
