= Christina Nelson Three-Decker =

- U.S. National Register of Historic Places
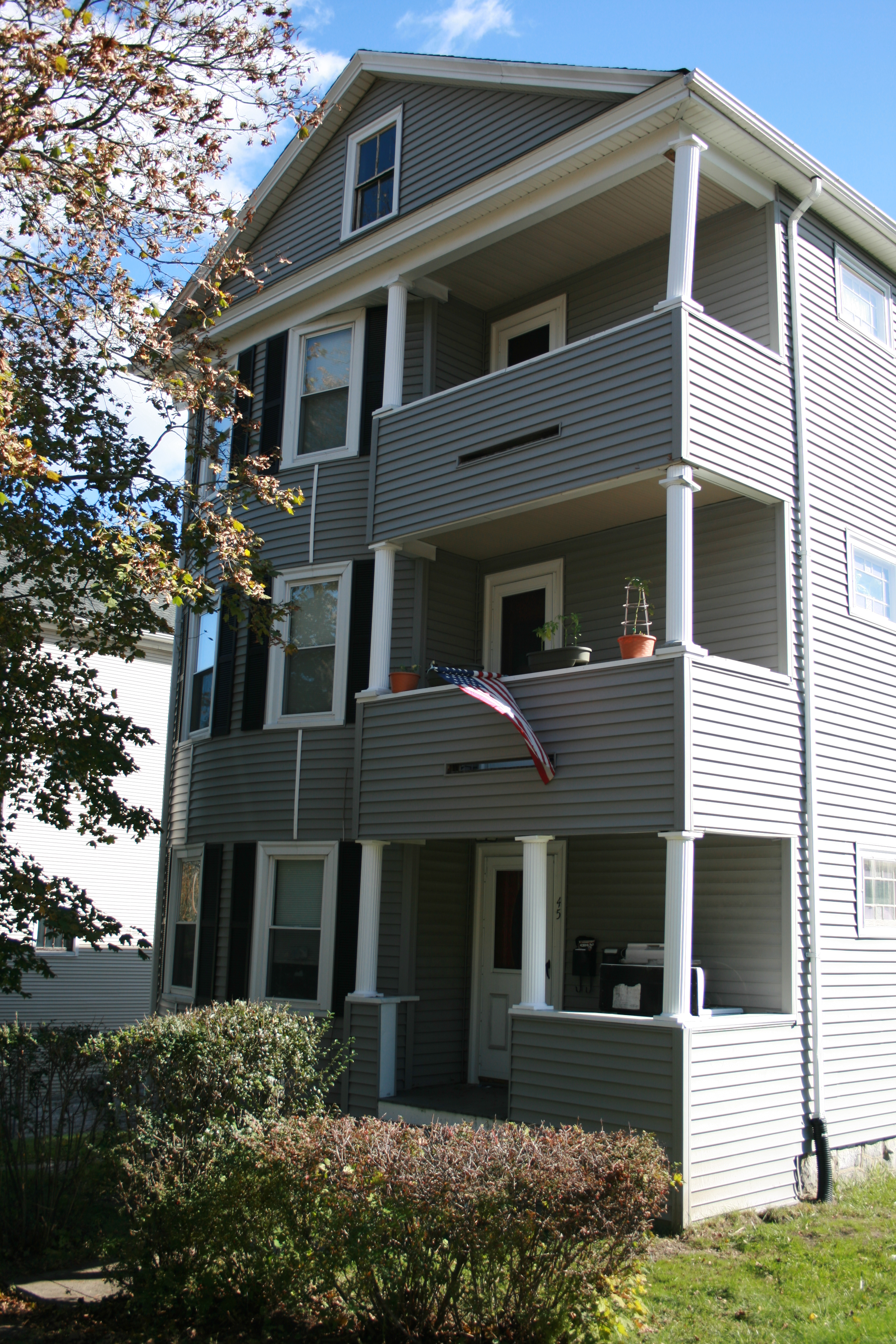

- Location within Massachusetts Location within the United States
- Location: 45 Butler St., Worcester, Massachusetts
- Coordinates: 42.23435°N 71.79948°W
- Area: less than one acre
- Built: c. 1916
- Architectural style: Colonial Revival
- MPS: Worcester Three-Deckers TR
- NRHP reference No.: 89002391
- Added to NRHP: February 9, 1990

The Christina Nelson Three-Decker is a historic triple decker residence in Worcester, Massachusetts. The house was built c. 1916, and is a well-preserved local example of Colonial Revival styling. It was listed on the National Register of Historic Places in 1990.

== Description and history ==
The Christina Nelson Three-Decker is located in the North Quinsigamond neighborhood of southern Worcester, on the south side of Butler Street between Bothina and Malmo Streets. It is three-story wood-frame structure, with a gabled roof and exterior finished in modern siding. Its three stories of porches are supported by Tuscan columns, and flanked on the left side by a rounded window bay. The main facade is topped by a fully pedimented gable end. The exterior was originally finished in a combination of clapboards and wooden shingles; the latter appeared in bands between the windows of the front window bay.

The house was built about 1916, during an extended residential building boom in the Quinsigamond area that lasted from 1890 to about 1920. Its earliest documented owner was Christina Nelson, who lived nearby on Keach Street; many of its early tenants were Scandinavian immigrants, drawn to employment at the nearby Quinsigamond Works, a metal processor and major local employer.

== See also ==
- National Register of Historic Places listings in eastern Worcester, Massachusetts
