= Mount Nelson =

Mount Nelson may refer to:

== Mountains ==
- Mount Nelson (mountain), a mountain on the southern edge of Hobart, Tasmania
- Mount Nelson (Alberta), a peak in the Canadian Rockies
- Mount Nelson (Antarctica), a mountain in Antarctica
- Mount Nelson (British Columbia), a mountain in British Columbia, Canada

== Other uses ==
- Mount Nelson, Tasmania, a suburb of Hobart, Tasmania
- Belmond Mount Nelson Hotel, a luxury hotel in Cape Town, South Africa
- Mount Nelson (horse), a Thoroughbred racehorse
