= Perry Nelson House =

Historic house in Minnesota, United States

- U.S. National Register of Historic Places
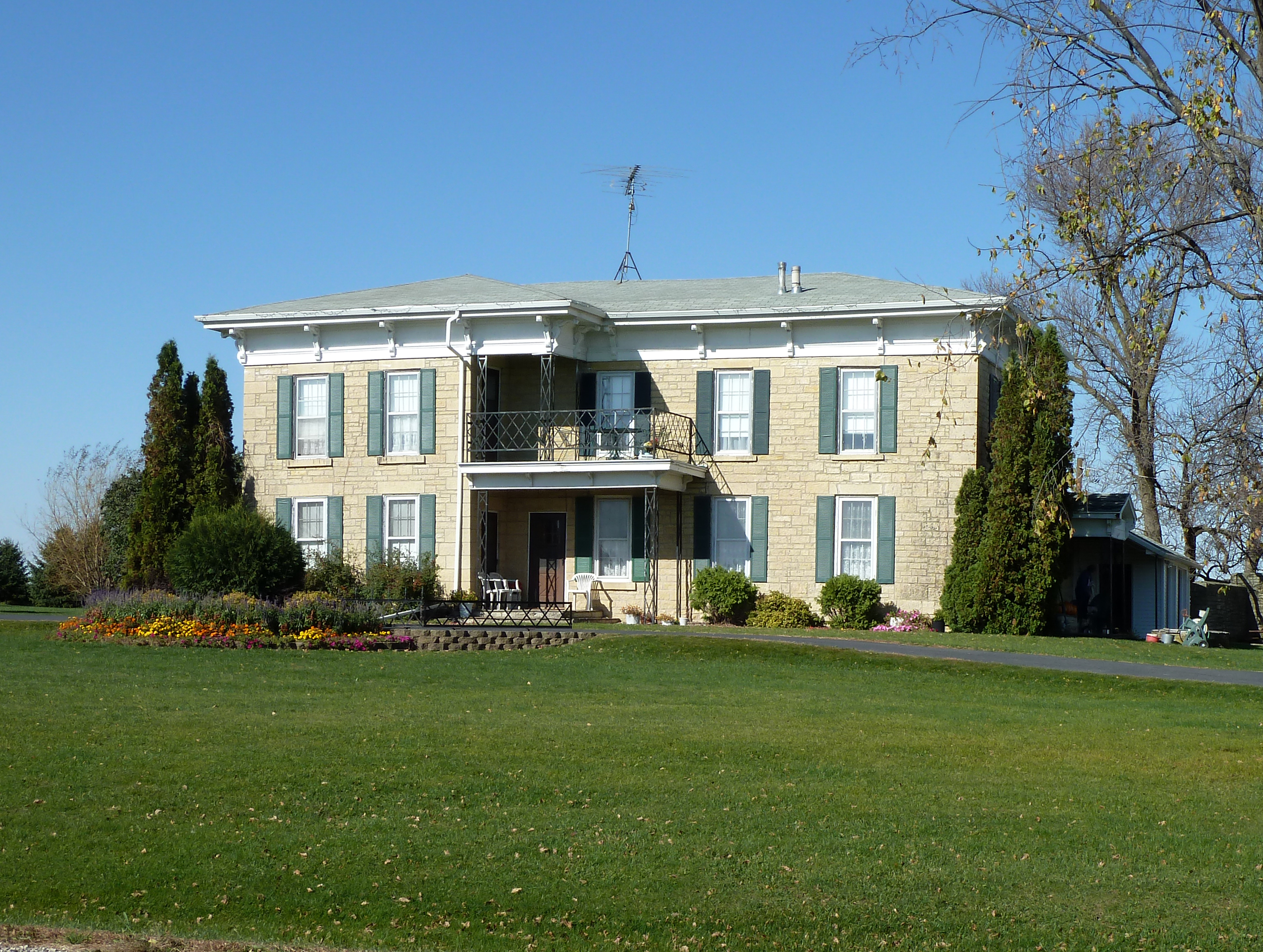

- Location within Minnesota Location within the United States
- Nearest city: West Concord, Minnesota
- Coordinates: 44°8′20″N 92°48′18″W
- Area: less than one acre
- Built: 1870
- Architectural style: Italianate
- MPS: Dodge County MRA
- NRHP reference No.: 82002939
- Added to NRHP: April 16, 1982

The Perry Nelson House is a historic farmhouse in Dodge County, Minnesota; located in Concord Township, it is approximately 6 miles (9.7 km) from West Concord, Minnesota. The private home was placed on the National Register of Historic Places (NRHP) on April 16, 1982. The house is considered significant for its distinctive scale among rural housing stock in the area, as well as its representation of both the agricultural development of the county and the Yankee heritage of the surrounding area.

== Structure ==
Designed in the Italianate style, the house consists of a long rectangle with a short wing on the south side (front) with a low hip roof. The roof and cornice extend east from the wing to form a porch area. The structure is constructed of random-range ashlar stone with margin draft on the west, south and east facades, and rock-faced ashlar on the north facade. The stone used was limestone carved from local quarries near Mantorville.

The three finished facades have bracketed eaves extending around them, and plain eaves on the north facade. The building's fenestration consists of six-over-six double-hung sash windows in rectangular openings with heavy lintels. A long wood and stone wing extends to the north. In the 1950s, the building's interior was totally remodeled and minor alterations were made to the exterior, including changes to the front porch and the addition of wood shutters. The original design had an outdoor staircase leading to the second floor of the house above the current front porch.

== History ==
Perry Nelson came to Minnesota in 1861. A farmer from New York, he reflected the Yankee heritage of the surrounding area: Virtually every farmer in the township originated from New York, New England, or Pennsylvania. The township, as well as the town of West Concord, were named after Concord, New Hampshire.

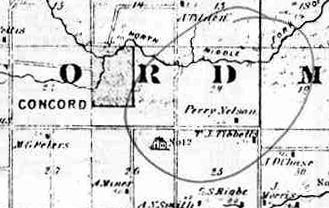
The Perry Nelson House marked on the 1874 map of Dodge County.

Nelson had the house built in the early 1870s, and it was noted in the Atlas of Minnesota published in 1874. A successful large scale farmer, he was reported to have shipped an average of two wagonloads of wheat to market every day from early fall until late spring. Nelson turned the house into a popular gathering spot for farmers and politicians that it was for a time dubbed the "House of Politics." He had carpenters build an outdoor staircase to the second floor to provide easy access so county politicians and farmers could meet in the upstairs rooms to discuss issues of the day. In addition, delegations of farmers would assemble to discuss upcoming prices and other problems they would face. The farmers would often be joined by their wives, which would add to the communal nature of the home.

Nelson moved to nearby Kasson and willed the house and a section of land to a niece who lived in Wisconsin. Though it remained in the family's ownership for many years, it was rented to tenants and suffered from neglect. By the time the house and farm were purchased by Walter and Ruth Buehler in 1950, it still lacked modern plumbing and heating equipment. After purchasing the property, the Buehlers spend two years and an estimated $40,000 restoring and renovating the property.
