= Fallowfield, Pennsylvania =

Unincorporated community in Pennsylvania, US

Coordinates: 40.13610°N 79.94064°W

- Unincorporated community
- Interactive map of Fallowfield, Pennsylvania
- Country: United States
- State: Pennsylvania
- County: Washington
- Time zone: UTC-5 (Eastern (EST))
  - Summer (DST): UTC-4 (EDT)

Fallowfield Township is an unincorporated community in Washington County, Pennsylvania, United States. It was the sixth township to be established after the 1781 formation of Washington County, and initially stretched from Elrama north to the Ten Mile Creek in what became Union and East Bethlehem townships on the Monongahela River. Home to the John H. Nelson House, which was built c. 1895, the township was gradually downsized as various sections were sectioned off into new municipalities (Allen, Carroll, Pike Run, and Somerset townships and the borough of Charleroi). Roughly 21.3 square miles (55 km^{2}) in size, its population was 4,300, according to the 2010 U.S. Census.

== Notable place ==
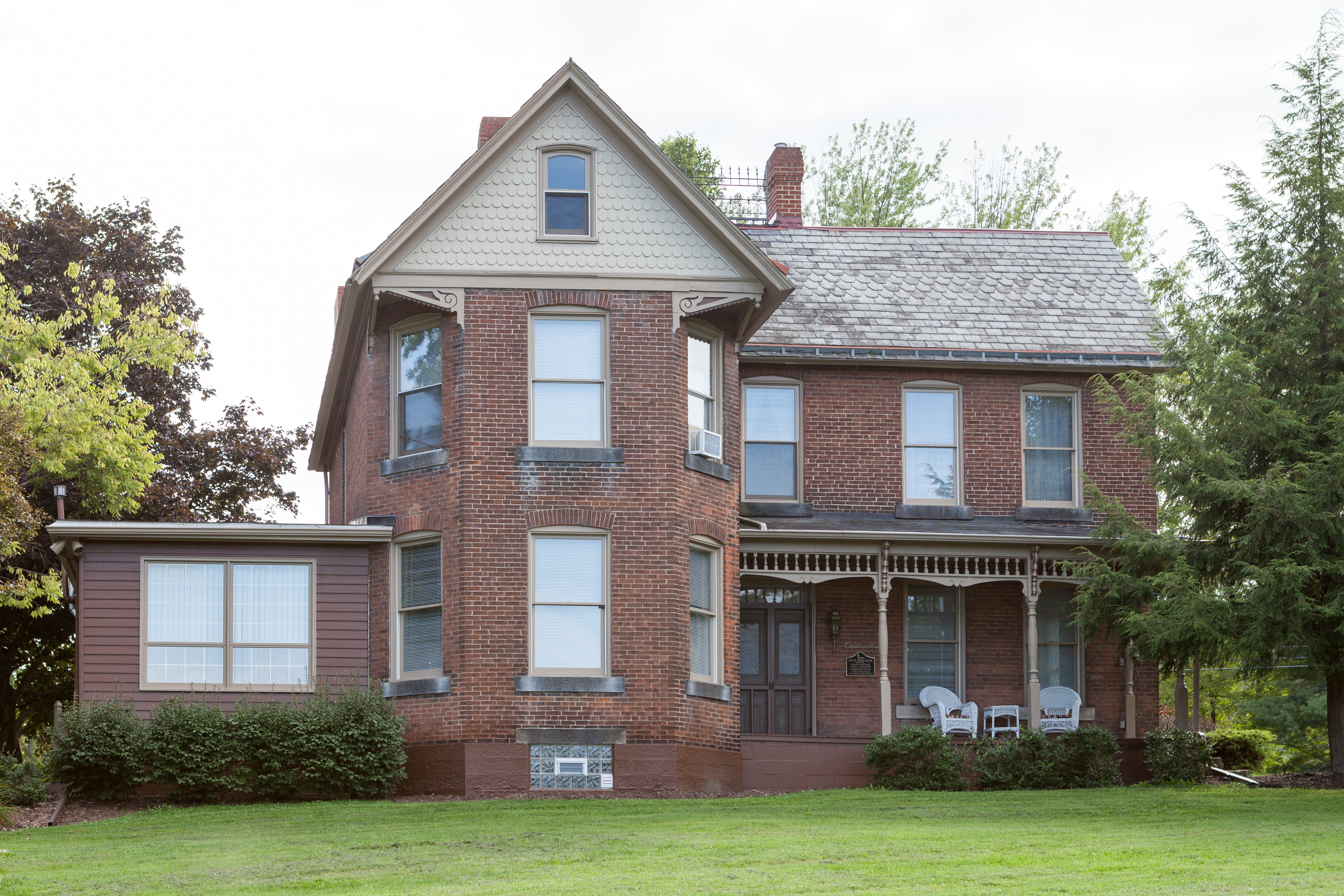
John H. Nelson House as seen in 2014

- John H. Nelson House: Built c. 1895, this two-story, Queen Anne, red brick farmhouse is located at 104 Colvin Road in Fallowfield Township. Designed by architect William H. Riggle, it was built by contractor H. A. Hannen for John H. Nelson, who was a son of Irish immigrant Francis Nelson.
