= Nelson Bay =

Nelson Bay may refer to:

- Nelson Bay, New South Wales
- Nelson Bay, Tasmania
- Nelson Bay Cave, South Africa
