= Lady Nelson (1801 ship) =

History

United Kingdom
- Name: Lady Nelson
- Namesake: Frances Nelson
- Owner: J. Atkins
- Launched: 1801, Bermuda
- Fate: Wrecked 15 November 1804

General characteristics
- Tons burthen: 284 (bm)
- Propulsion: Sail

Lady Nelson, of 284 tons (bm), was launched in Bermuda in 1801, and was built of Bermuda cedar. Lady Nelson traded between London and Curacoa until 1803. She then became a whaler for J. Atkins and was valued at £6,500 in 1802. Under Captain James Lindsey (or Linsey) she sailed for the Galapagos. She was lost there on 15 November 1804. At the time of her loss she had 100 tons of oil. Her crew were saved.
