= Lord Nelson Hotel =

Lord Nelson Hotel may refer to:

- Lord Nelson Hotel (Halifax, Nova Scotia), a hotel in Canada
- Lord Nelson Hotel, Hindley, a public house in Greater Manchester, England
- Lord Nelson Hotel, Millers Point, a pub and hotel in Sydney, Australia
