= Nelson City =

Nelson City may refer to:

- Nelson, British Columbia, a city in Canada
- Nelson City (provincial electoral district), a former electoral district in British Columbia, Canada
- Nelson, New Zealand
- Nelson (New Zealand electorate), formerly known as "City of Nelson"
