= Nelson Township =

Nelson Township may refer to:

- Nelson Township, Clay County, Arkansas, in Clay County, Arkansas
- Nelson Township, Lee County, Illinois
- Nelson Township, Cloud County, Kansas
- Nelson Township, Michigan
- Nelson Township, Watonwan County, Minnesota
- Nelson Township, Barnes County, North Dakota
- Nelson Township, Portage County, Ohio
- Nelson Township, Pennsylvania
