= Nelson Lake (Alaska) =

Lake in the state of Alaska, United States

- Location within Alaska Location within North America
- Location: Yukon–Koyukuk Census Area, Alaska
- Coordinates: 66.494072°N 147.697924°W
- Type: Lake
- Surface elevation: 427 feet (130 m)

Nelson Lake is a lake in Yukon–Koyukuk Census Area, Alaska, United States. It is located in the Brooks Range area of Alaska and is part of the Yukon Flats National Wildlife Refuge. The lake is found at an elevation of 427 feet (130 m).

== Name ==
Nelson Lake is believed to have been named by cartographer William Yanert, with the name first appearing on a 1916 map he produced of the Yukon Flats region.
