= Nelson Farm =

Nelson Farm or Nelson Barn may refer to:

- Nelson Farm, Nebraska
- Nelson Family Farm, Livermore, ME, listed on the NRHP in Maine
- Nelson-Pettis Farmsteads Historic District, St. Joseph, MO, listed on the NRHP in Missouri
- Ole Nelson Barn, Summit, SD, listed on the NRHP in South Dakota
- Olson-Nelson Farm, Clifton, TX, listed on the NRHP in Texas
- Nelson Farmstead, Gainesville, TX, listed on the NRHP in Texas
- Albert Nelson Farmstead, Ellensburg, WA, listed on the NRHP in Washington

== See also ==
- Nelson House (disambiguation)
