= Edward Nelson Jr. =

United States Coast Guard admiral

- Born: March 17, 1931; Worcester, Massachusetts, U.S.
- Died: June 5, 2018 (aged 87) Astoria, Oregon, U.S.
- Allegiance: United States
- Branch: United States Coast Guard
- Service years: 1953–1989
- Rank: Rear admiral
- Commands: Commander, Seventeenth Coast Guard District; Superintendent of the United States Coast Guard Academy

Edward Nelson Jr. (March 17, 1931 – June 5, 2018) was a United States Coast Guard rear admiral. He was Superintendent at the United States Coast Guard Academy from June 1982 to June 1986. He retired in 1989 after serving as Commander of the Seventeenth Coast Guard District. He died in 2018.
