= Nelsen =

Nelsen is a Norwegian or Danish surname that may also refer to:

== People ==
- Ancher Nelsen (1904–1992), American politician
- Bill Nelsen (1941–2019), American football player and coach
- Bruce G. Nelsen (born 1935), American politician
- Donald Nelsen (born 1944), American Olympic cyclist
- Eric Nelsen (born 1991), American actor
- Grace Nelsen Jones (1893–2006), oldest verified person born in the state of Virginia, USA
- Jeff Nelsen (born 1969), Canadian French horn player
- Marlin B. Nelsen (1936–1980), American chiropractor and politician
- Nels Nelsen (1894–1943), member of the Canadian Ski Hall of Fame
- Robert S. Nelsen (born 1952), American academic administrator
- Rod Nelsen, creator of computer game Tharolian Tunnels
- Ryan Nelsen (born 1977), New Zealand footballer
- Travis Nelsen, member of the indie folk band Okkervil River

== Other uses ==
- Nelsen Middle School, Renton, Washington, USA
- Nels Nelsen Historic Area, and Nels Nelsen Ski Jump, Mount Revelstoke National Park, British Columbia, Canada

== See also ==
- Nelson (disambiguation)
- Nielsen (disambiguation)
