= List of ships named Lord Nelson =

Several ships have borne the name Lord Nelson for Admiral Lord Nelson:

- Lord Nelson (1798 ship) made five voyages carrying slaves from West Africa to the West Indies. A French naval squadron captured her in 1806 off Sierra Leone on her sixth voyage, before she had embarked any slaves.
- Lord Nelson (East Indiaman) was an East Indiaman, launched in late 1799, sailing for the East India Company. She made five voyages, of which she completed four. On her second voyage the French privateer Bellone captured her, but the Royal Navy recaptured her within about two weeks. On her fifth voyage Lord Nelson foundered in 1808 with the loss of all aboard.
- HMS Lord Nelson (1800) was a storeship purchased in 1800 and sold in 1807.
- Lord Nelson (1800 ship) was launched in Spain in 1792 under another name. She came into British hands as a prize in 1800. She was initially a merchantman but then made two voyages as a slave ship carrying slaves from West Africa to the West Indies. A French privateer finally captured her in May 1806 on her third slave trading voyage before she had disembarked her slaves.
- HMS Lord Nelson (1906) was a Lord Nelson-class battleship launched in 1906. She was scrapped in 1922.
- STS Lord Nelson, a sail training ship launched in 1986 and used by the British Jubilee Sailing Trust
- Hired armed cutter Lord Nelson: any one of three hired naval cutters

== See also ==
- Lord Nelson-class battleship
- HMS Nelson –any one of four Royal Navy warships also named for Lord Nelson
- Lord Nelson 41, an American sailboat design
