= Nelson Airport =

Nelson Airport can refer to a number of airports:

- Nelson Airport (British Columbia), an airport in Nelson, British Columbia, Canada
- Nelson Airport (New Zealand), an airport in Nelson, New Zealand
