= Admiral Lord Nelson School =

Secondary school in Hampshire, England

The Admiral Lord Nelson School

Location
- Dundas Lane; Copnor; Portsmouth, Hampshire, PO3 5XT; England; 50.818°N 1.054°W

Information
- Type: Academy
- Motto: Dare to dream; aim to achieve
- Established: 1995
- Local authority: Portsmouth
- Department for Education URN: 140697 Tables
- Ofsted: Reports
- Chair of Governors: Tania Osborne
- Executive Headteacher: Nys Hardingham
- Head of School: Chris Doherty
- Gender: Co-educational
- Age: 11 to 16
- Enrolment: 1009
- Houses: Warrior, Victory, Mary Rose, Spinnaker
- Colours: Purple and green
- Website: www.alns.co.uk

Admiral Lord Nelson School is a mixed co-educational secondary school in Portsmouth, Hampshire, England. The school, on the eastern side of Portsmouth on Dundas Lane, opposite Ocean retail park and running parallel to the Eastern Road, is next to Langstone Harbour, and was constructed on a green field site.

Named after Horatio Nelson, 1st Viscount Nelson, it was established in 1995 and specialises in business and enterprise to provide education for 11- to 16-year-old students. On opening it had an initial attendance of 170-year 7 students, which has subsequently grown to around 1000.

== Facilities ==
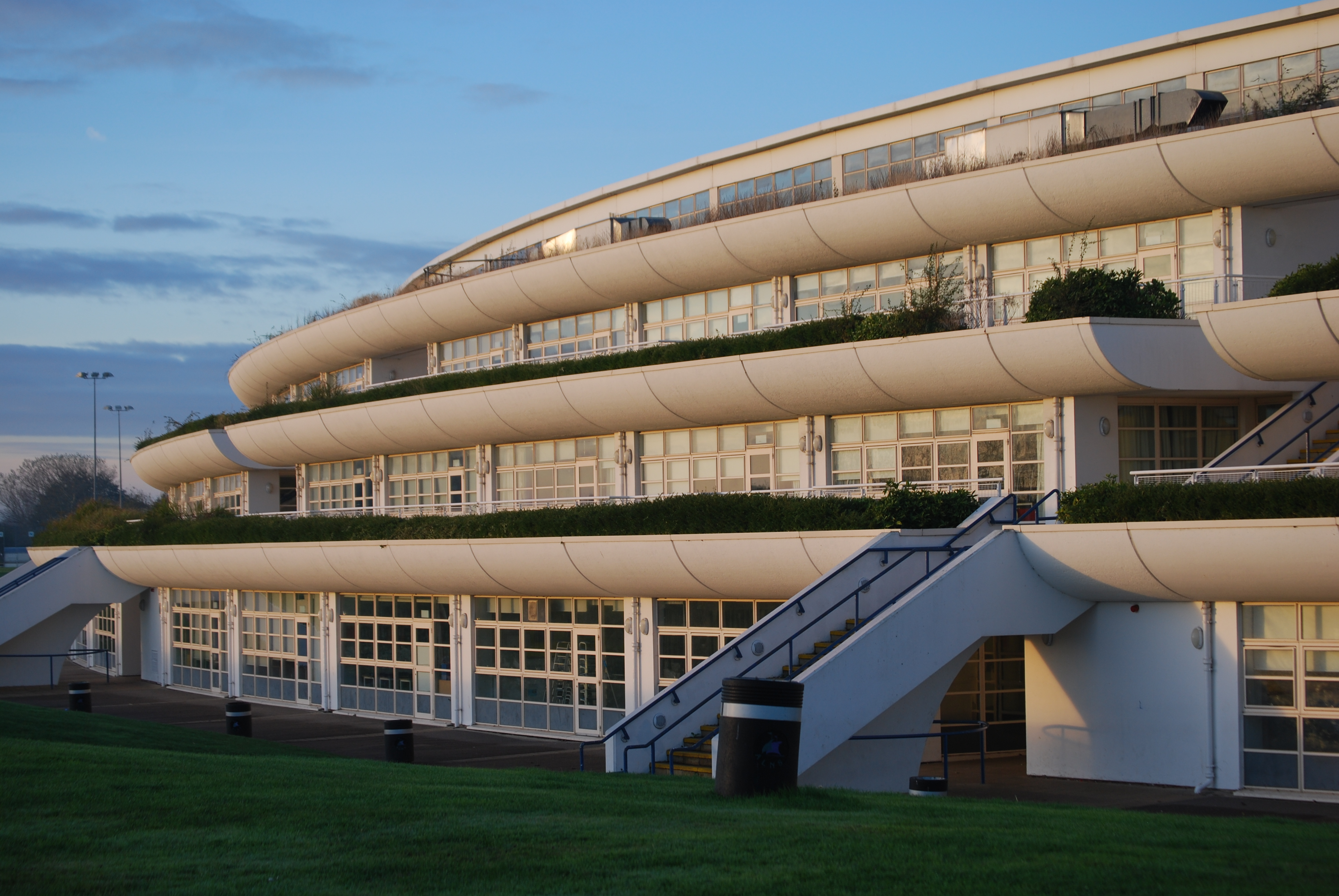
Photograph of Admiral Lord Nelson School from the fields

Along with another Portsmouth state school, Milton Cross, Admiral Lord Nelson School is currently one of only two fully accessible schools in the city, with lifts for disabled students.

Sporting facilities include an outdoor all-weather full-size AstroTurf pitch and multi-use game area and an indoor fitness studio. These facilities, and a sports hall and dance studio, are also used by the local community, as part of the Community Improvement Partnership in the city of Portsmouth.

== Ofsted and governance ==
The 2017 Ofsted Inspection awarded the school a rating of Good.

The founding headteacher, Dianne Smith, was succeeded by Steven Labedz who was appointed by the governors at the beginning of 2006. Nys Hardingham is the current headteacher.

== Academy status ==
In October 2013, the school announced it was proposing to change its governance status from community school to academy. The school formally converted to academy status on 1 April 2014. As a converter academy, the school is independent from both the local authority and any form of sponsor or multi-academy trust. The school is funded directly from central government.
