= Port Nelson =

Port Nelson may refer to:

- Port Nelson, Bahamas
- Port Nelson, Manitoba
- Port Nelson, Newfoundland and Labrador
- Port Nelson, Australia
- Port Nelson, New Zealand
- Port Nelson dredge, active in Port Nelson, Manitoba, from 1914 to 1918, wrecked in 1924
