= Miltoncross Academy =

Location
- Milton Road; Milton; Portsmouth, Hampshire, PO3 6RB; England; 50.8007°N 1.0607°W

Information
- Type: Academy
- Motto: Flourish
- Established: 1 September 1999
- Department for Education URN: 140605 Tables
- Ofsted: Reports
- Headteacher: Nick Giles
- Gender: Coeducational
- Age: 11 to 16
- Website: www.miltoncross-tkat.org

Miltoncross Academy (formerly Miltoncross School) is a coeducational secondary school located in the Milton area of Portsmouth in the English county of Hampshire.

The school is situated on the site of the former Priorsdean Hospital for infectious diseases, which was established in 1884. Miltoncross School opened on a different site in Penhale Road in September 1999, but did not move to the building it is housed in until 2000. Previously a community school administered by Portsmouth City Council, Miltoncross school converted to academy status on 1 November 2014 and was renamed Miltoncross Academy. The school is sponsored by The Kemnal Academies Trust, but continues to coordinate with Portsmouth City Council for admissions.
