= John H. Nelson House =

Historic house in Pennsylvania, United States

- U.S. National Register of Historic Places
- Washington County History & Landmarks Foundation Landmark
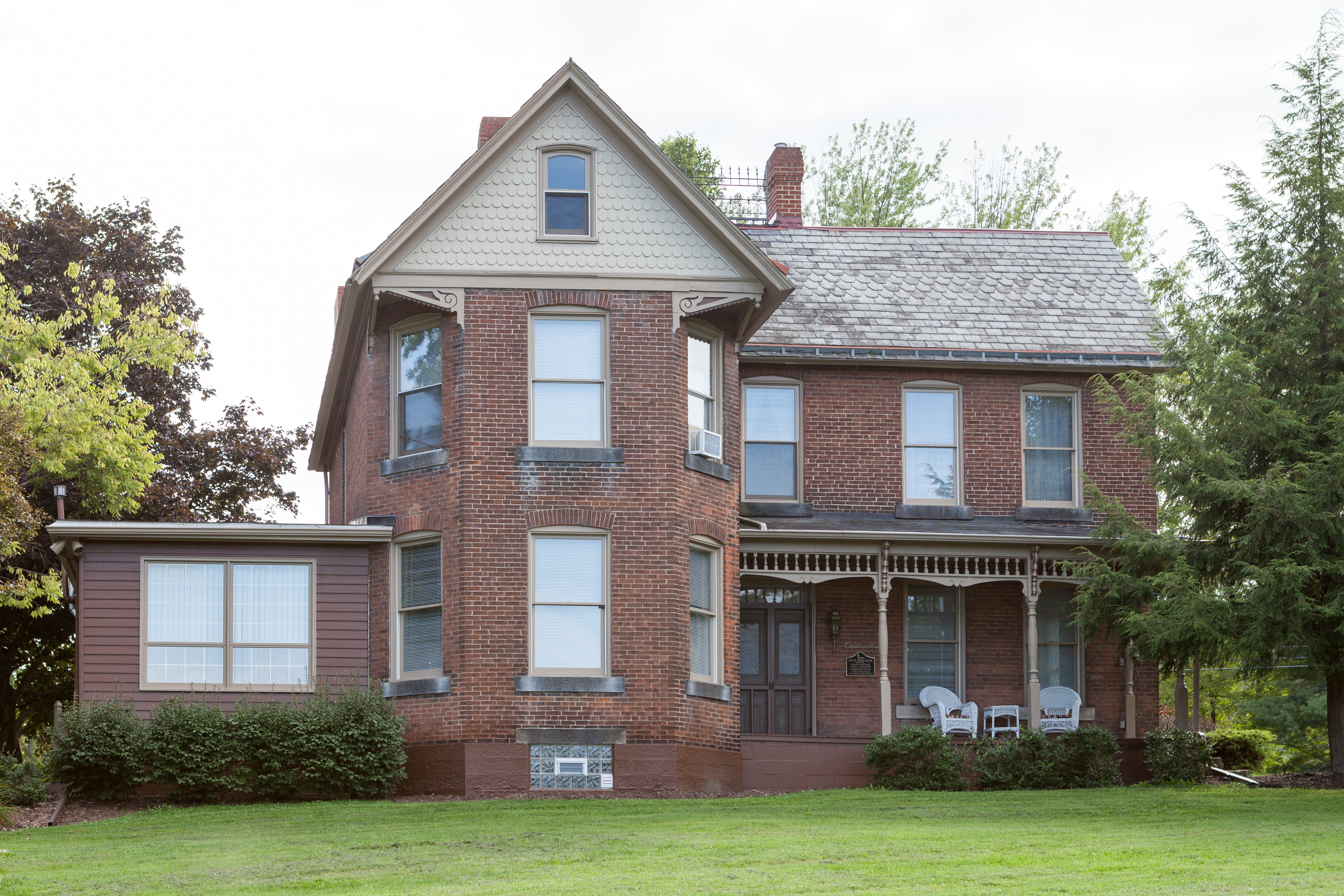
- The house in August, 2014

- Location within Pennsylvania Location within the United States
- Location: 104 Colvin Rd., Fallowfield, Pennsylvania
- Coordinates: 40°8′4″N 79°57′28″W
- Area: 1 acre (0.40 ha)
- Built: 1895
- Architect: Riggle, William H.; Hannen, H.A.
- Architectural style: Queen Anne
- NRHP reference No.: 00000452
- Added to NRHP: May 05, 2000

John H. Nelson House is a historic building in Fallowfield, Pennsylvania.

It is designated as a historic residential landmark/farmstead by the Washington County History & Landmarks Foundation.
