= Nelson County High School (Kentucky) =

Coordinates: 37.82919°N 85.42434°W

Location
- 1070 Bloomfield Road; Bardstown, KY 40004

Information
- School type: Public
- Motto: All A's: Attitude, Ambition, Achievement
- Founded: 1969
- School district: Nelson County School District
- Superintendent: Wes Bradley
- Area trustee: David Norman, Joedy Gilliland, Tracy Bowling (Board Chair), Amanda Deaton, Karen Lee
- Principal: Jessica Sekulski
- Grades: 9–12
- Enrollment: 857 (2016–17)
- Campus: Exurban
- Colors: Red, white, and blue
- Mascot: Cardinals
- Nickname: Cardinals and Lady Cards
- Feeder schools: Bloomfield Middle School; Old Kentucky Home Middle School
- Website: https://nchs.nelson.kyschools.us/welcome

Nelson County High School is a public high school located in Bardstown, Kentucky. Until 2012, it was the only high school in the Nelson County School District, and was by far the largest of the four high schools then located in Bardstown (one public and operated by the Bardstown city school district, one Roman Catholic, and one Protestant). In its final year as the county district's only high school, it had 1,435 students.

The school's attendance zone split with the 2012 opening of Thomas Nelson High School, located in an unincorporated part of the county that has a Bardstown mailing address.
