= E. A. Nelson Automobile Company =

American automobile manufacturer

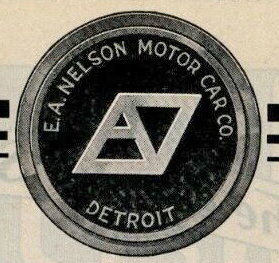
- 1920 logo
- Company type: Automobile manufacturer
- Industry: Automotive
- Founded: 1917; 108 years ago
- Founder: Emil A. Nelson
- Defunct: 1921; 104 years ago
- Fate: Bankruptcy
- Headquarters: Detroit, Michigan, United States., United States
- Products: Automobiles
- Production output: 1,028 (1917-1921)

E. A. Nelson Automobile Company, from 1917 to 1920 known as E. A. Nelson Motor Car Company, was an automobile manufacturer company, based in Detroit, Michigan, United States. It operated from 1917 to 1921.

== History ==
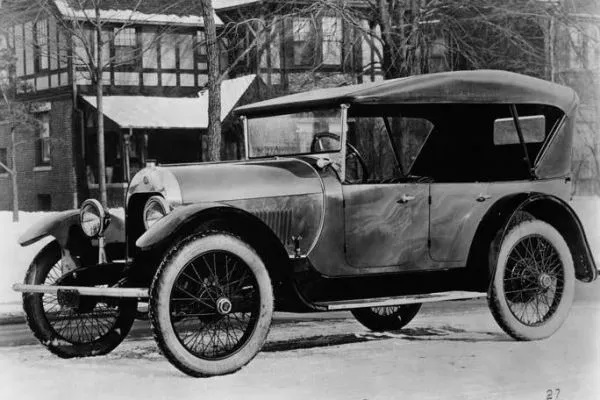
1921 Nelson Model E Touring.

Emil A. Nelson was an engineer who worked for Packard, Oldsmobile, and Hupmobile. In 1917, he designed his own car and opened E. A. Nelson Motor Car Company, based in Detroit, Michigan, United States. The company began manufacturing Nelson 29 HP cars in 1917, with a production capacity of ten vehicles per day. The car was designed along the European style and was equipped with 2.4 liter four-cylinder aero-type engine with overhead cams, and 29 horsepower (21.33 kW). Its chassis had a wheelbase of 264 cm (104 in), though some sources also list 289 cm (113.78 in). The car was manufactured in three versions: touring car, roadster, and sedan. In 1919, the touring car version was sold at the price of 1,500 USD, which is an equivalent to $27,204 in 2024. In 1920, the company introduced the Nelson Model D, with the same specifications as its predecessor.

Beginning the production just before the United States had entered the World War I, and the post-war depression, had caused the E. A. Nelson Automobile Company to have financial issues. In 1919, the planned cooperation with the Gray Company, a Detroit-based engine manufacturer, was unsuccessful. In March 1920, the company filed for bankruptcy for the first time. In September 1920, the company went through restructurization, and its name was changed to E.A. Nelson Automobile Company.

In 1921, the Nelson Model E car was introduced. It had similar specifications to its predecessor, with the only difference being its engine having 30 horsepower (22.37 kW). It was offered in two versions: touring car, and roadster.

A year later, in September 1921, the company had again filed for bankruptcy again and was permanently closed. In total, from 1917 to 1921, the company manufactured 1028 cars. One car had been preserved to the present day.

== Gallery ==
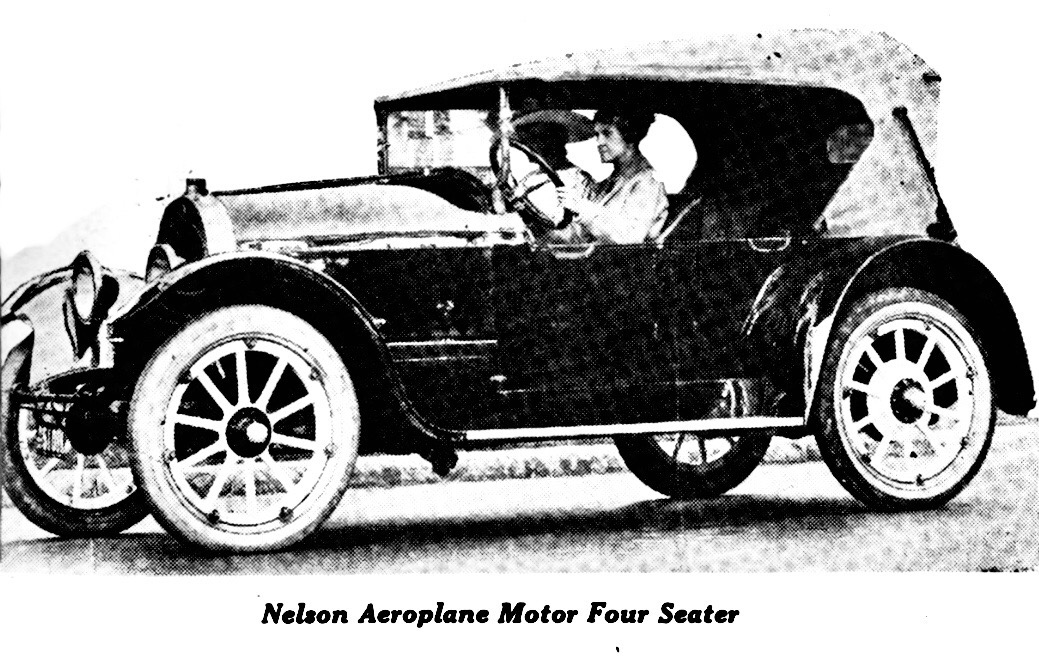
1917 Nelson 29 HP Convertible

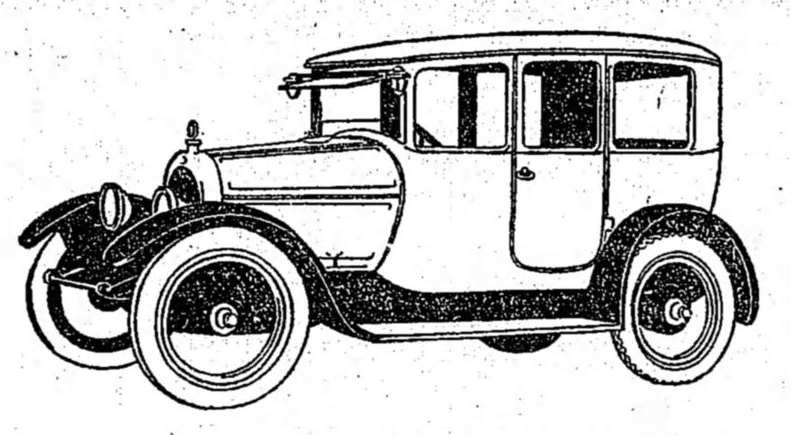
1917 Nelson 29 HP Sedan

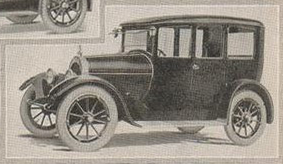
1920 Nelson Model D Sedan

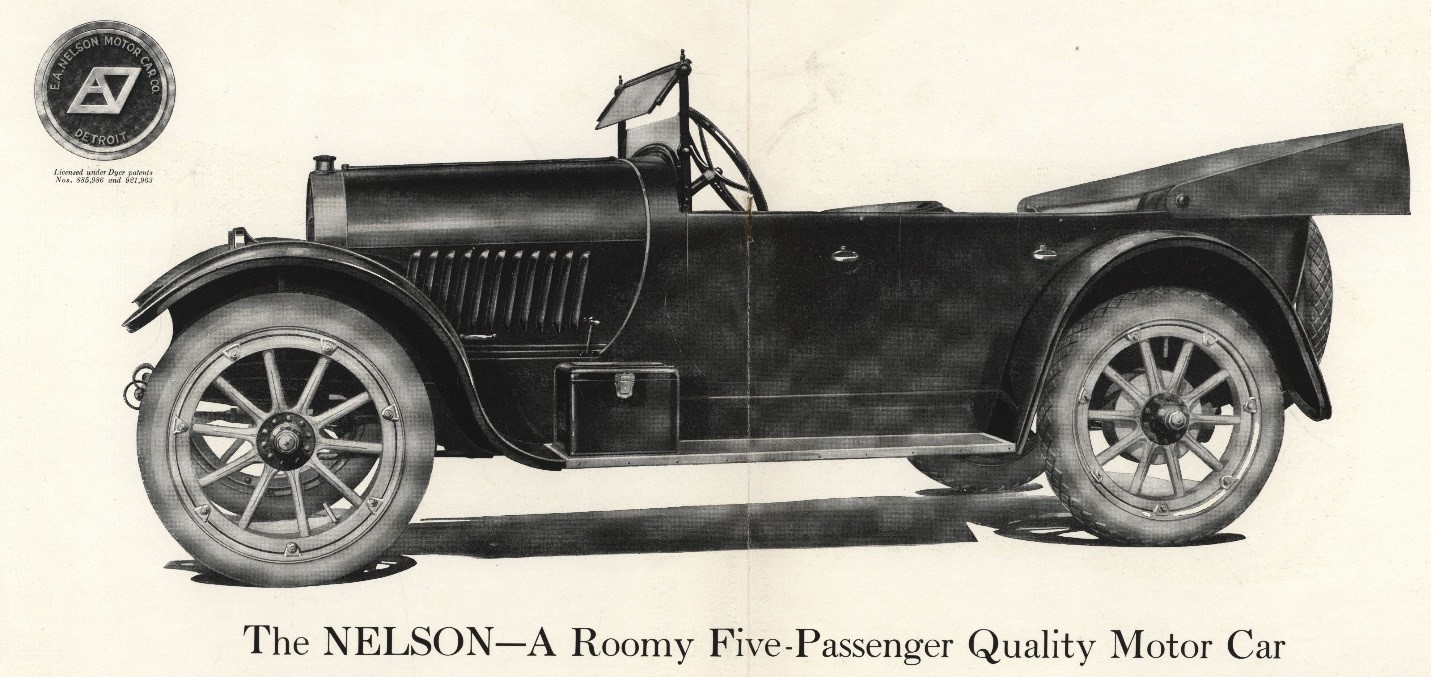
1920 Nelson Model D Roadster
