= Thomas Nelson House (Boonville, Missouri) =

Historic house in Missouri, United States

- U.S. National Register of Historic Places
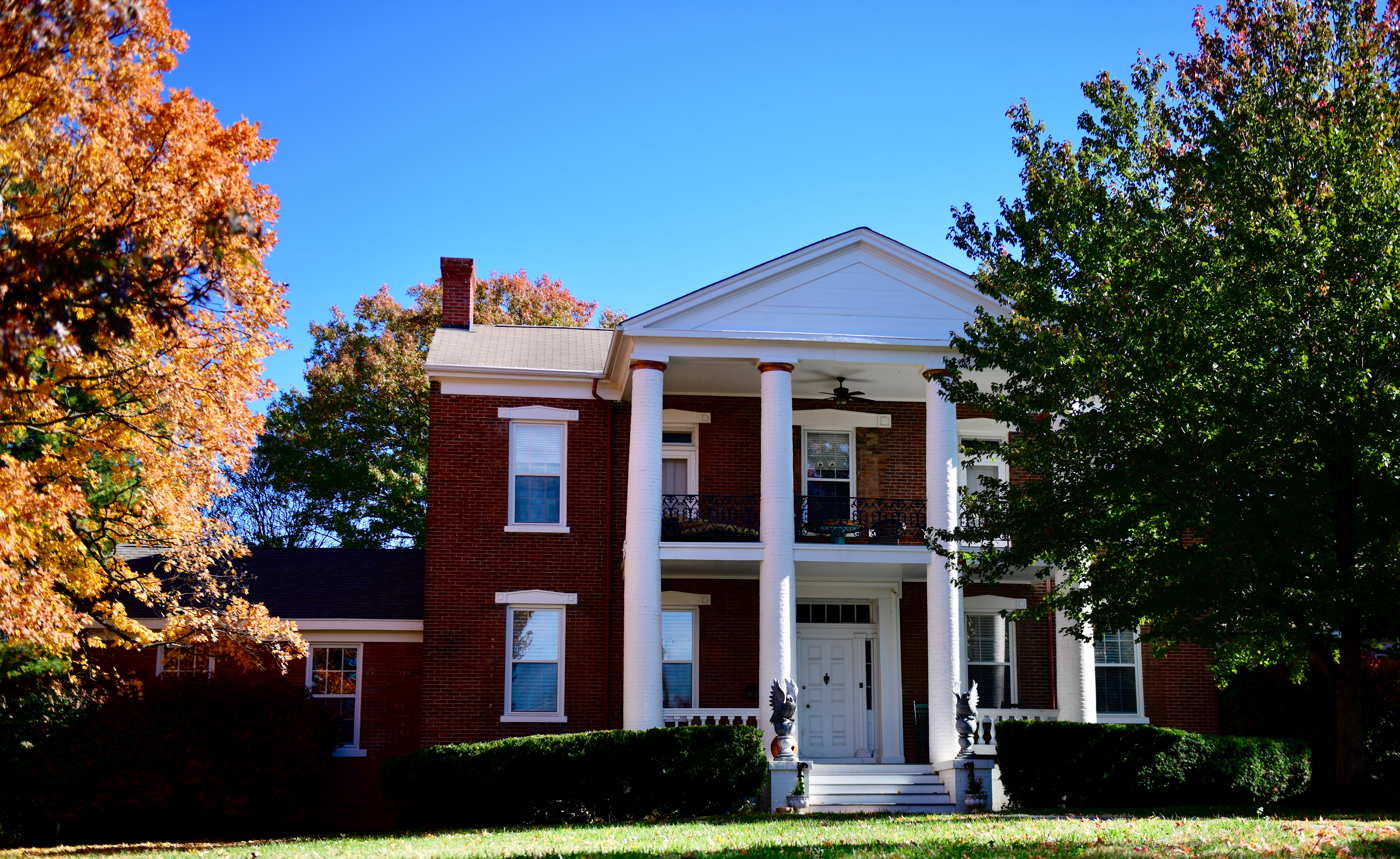

- Location within Missouri Location within the United States
- Location: 700 Tenth St. Boonville, Missouri
- Coordinates: 38°58′26″N 92°44′5″W
- Built: 1843; 183 years ago
- Architectural style: Greek Revival
- MPS: Boonville Missouri MRA
- NRHP reference No.: 82005302
- Added to NRHP: March 16, 1990

Thomas Nelson House, also known as Forest Hill, is a historic home located at Boonville, Cooper County, Missouri. It was built in 1843, and is a two-story, Greek Revival style brick dwelling with a rear ell. Symmetrical, flanking one-story wings were added about 1946. It has a side gable roof and features a two-story gabled, pedimented front portico, constructed about 1853. The house is in the George Caleb Bingham painting "Forest Hill the Nelson Homestead."

It was listed on the National Register of Historic Places in 1990.
