= John B. Nelson House =

Historic house in Delaware, US

- U.S. National Register of Historic Places
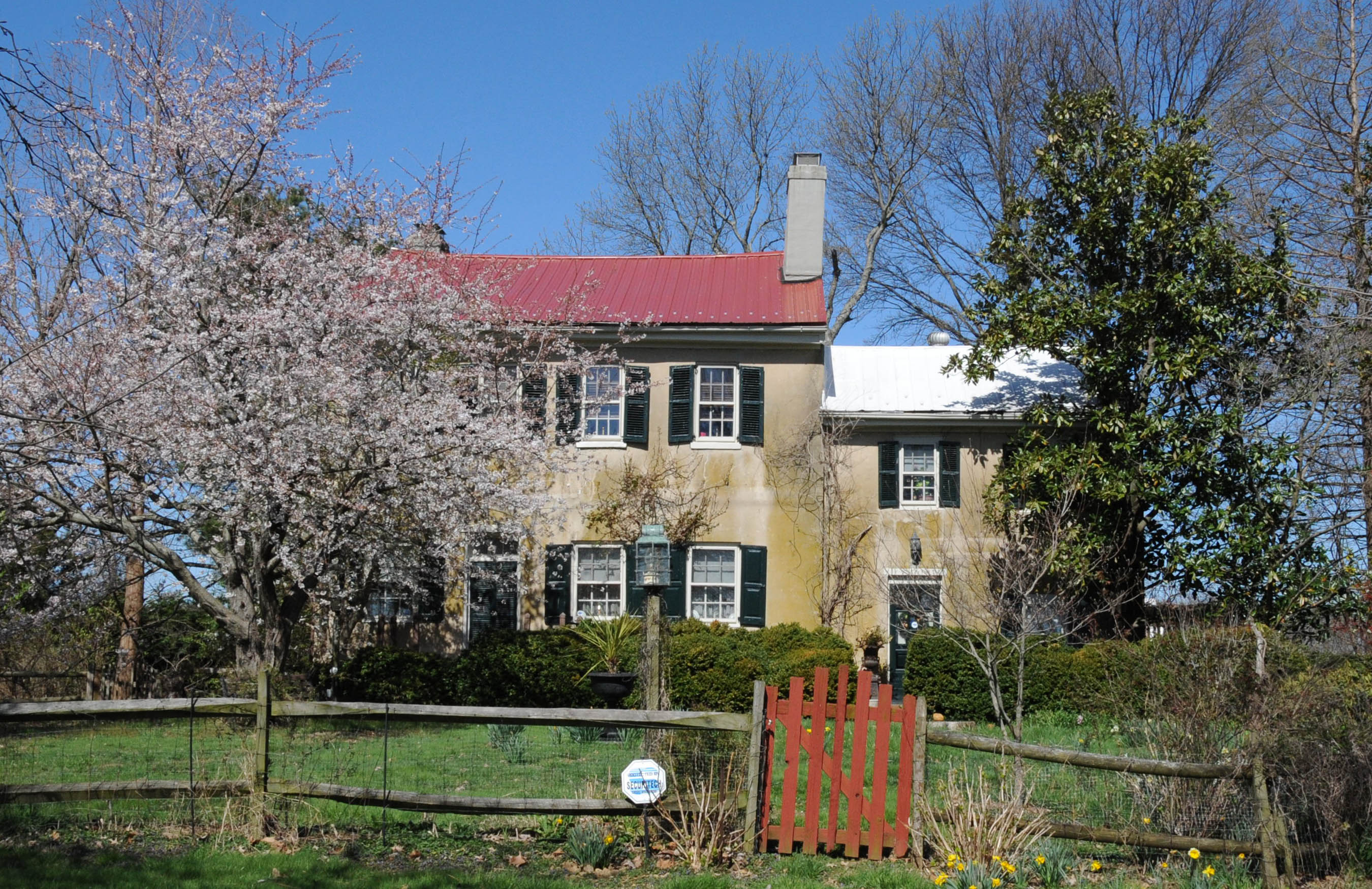

- Location within Delaware Location within the United States
- Location: 740 Dutch Neck Road, near Port Penn, Delaware
- Coordinates: 39.532763°N 75.632667°W
- Area: 0 acres (0 ha)
- Architectural style: Four-room plan
- NRHP reference No.: 78000906
- Added to NRHP: December 8, 1978

John B. Nelson House is a historic home close to Port Penn in New Castle County, Delaware, United States. It was built in the early 19th century, and consists of a two-story, four-bay by three-bay core with a one-room wing. It has a two-story wing added in the mid-19th century. It is a stuccoed brick structure.

It was listed on the National Register of Historic Places in 1978.
