= Nelson, California =

Unincorporated community in California, United States

Nelson
- Unincorporated community
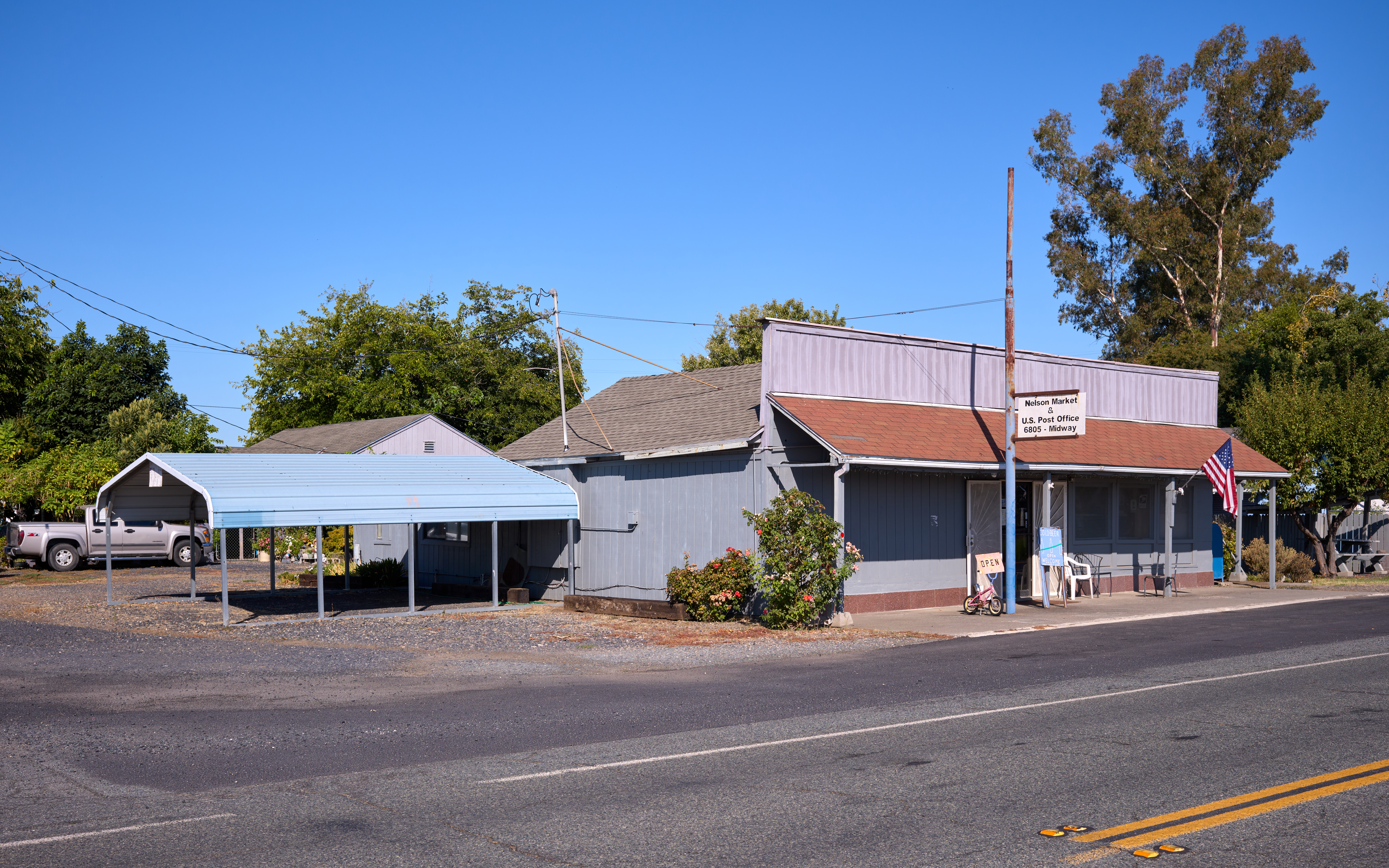
- Nelson Market & U.S. Post Office (2025)

- Location in California Nelson (the United States)
- Coordinates: 39°33′08″N 121°45′56″W
- Country: United States
- State: California
- County: Butte
- Elevation: 121 ft (37 m)

Nelson (formerly, Nelson Station) is an unincorporated community in Butte County, California, United States. It lies 6.5 miles (10.5 km) south-southeast of Durham, at an elevation of 121 feet (37 m). Nelson's first post office was established in 1873; its zip code is 95958. The place was founded in 1873 by the California and Oregon Railroad Company and named for an early settler, A.D. Nelson. By 1882 Nelson had two warehouses, a hotel, a store, a blacksmith shop, and a saloon, and was a major center of wheat shipment. Rice is the major crop grown in the area today.
