= Nelson County High School (Virginia) =

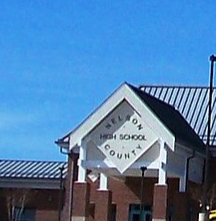

Location
- 6919 Thomas Nelson Highway; Lovingston, Nelson County, Virginia 22949; USA

Information
- Status: Open
- School district: Nelson County Public Schools
- NCES District ID: 5102580
- Superintendent: Amanda Hester
- NCES School ID: 510258001032
- Principal: Kevin Walker
- Colors: Green & Gold
- Mascot: Governors
- Nickname: Nelson County Governors
- Website: www.nelson.k12.va.us/o/nchs

Nelson County High School is a four-year comprehensive public high school located within the Nelson County Public Schools School District. It has an enrollment of 540 students in grades 9–12. Instruction is provided by 51 professional staff members. Nelson County High School has a shared campus with Nelson County Middle School. The school is accredited by the Virginia State Board of Education.

As of December 2023, the school is going through a re-roofing project.

== Creative arts courses ==
=== Theatre ===
- The school's One Act Play team won the Region 2C Theatre Festival at the high school on November 18, 2023 & advanced to the Virginia High School League Class 2 Theatre Festival on December 2, 2023.
- The cast and directors of "Selections from the One Act Play That Goes Wrong" won the Region 2C Sub-region Theatre Festival in November 2022.
- Two students both received recognition as Outstanding Actors, and another two received honorable mention awards for their acting.

=== Art ===
Nelson County students design art for local billboards.

== Student organizations ==
=== Future Farmers of America ===
The school is active in FFA.

== Current statistics ==
Racial breakdown:
White	72.5%
African American	13.9%
Hispanic	7.3%
Multi Racial	5.9%
Native American	0.4%

Schools That Feed into Nelson County High:
Elementary:	Middle:
Rockfish River Elementary	Nelson Middle
Tye River Elementary	

== Historical statistics (information from SchoolDigger) ==
Year	# Students	Full-time Teachers	Student/Teacher ratio	% Free/Discounted Lunch
1989	611	45.5	13.4	n/a
1990	645	46.4	13.9	n/a
1991	581	46.0	12.6	n/a
1992	584	46.9	12.4	n/a
1993	618	48.4	12.8	n/a
1994	645	62.5	n/a	17.8
1995	684	n/a	0.0	17.7
1996	684	n/a	0.0	17.7
1997	693	n/a	0.0	17.5
1998	674	n/a	0.0	19.4
1999	694	60.0	11.6	25.1
2000	705	n/a	0.0	22.1
2001	722	56.5	12.8	24
2002	636	59.8	10.6	25
2003	636	59.8	10.6	25
2004	637	52.8	12.1	32
2005	654	52.7	12.4	32.1
2006	637	52.0	12.3	34.3
2007	645	50.4	12.8	33.8
2008	596	45.2	13.2	51.4
2009	568	42.6	13.3	40
2010	581	40.1	14.4	43.3
2011	580	38.4	15.0	40.3
2012	597	41.5	14.3	43
2013	597	44.0	13.5	41.5
2014	611	46.9	13.0	42.1
2015	609	44.0	13.8	46.3
2016	643	47.0	13.6	44.2
2017	625	48.0	13.0	46.4
2018	636	48.1	13.2	50.5
2019	632	48.9	12.9	46
2020	574	47.9	11.9	46.3
2021	570	47.6	11.9	n/a
2022	545	48.2	11.3	48.8

=== Historical racial background (information from SchoolDigger) ===
Year	White	African American	Asian	Hispanic	American Indian	Pacific Islander	Two or More Races	Not Specified	Total
1989	n/a	n/a	n/a	n/a	n/a	n/a	n/a	611	611
1990	n/a	n/a	n/a	n/a	n/a	n/a	n/a	645	645
1991	0	0	0	0	0	n/a	n/a	581	581
1992	n/a	n/a	n/a	n/a	n/a	n/a	n/a	584	584
1993	465	143	1	9	0	n/a	n/a	0	618
1994	485	144	2	14	0	n/a	n/a	0	645
1995	491	173	3	16	1	n/a	n/a	0	684
1996	491	173	3	16	1	n/a	n/a	0	684
1997	506	165	3	18	1	n/a	n/a	0	693
1998	508	152	4	10	0	n/a	n/a	0	674
1999	532	147	6	9	0	n/a	n/a	0	694
2000	566	132	4	7	0	n/a	n/a	-4	705
2001	578	135	1	7	1	n/a	n/a	0	722
2002	517	115	0	3	1	n/a	n/a	0	636
2003	517	115	0	3	1	n/a	n/a	0	636
2004	508	124	2	3	0	n/a	n/a	0	637
2005	533	111	4	6	0	n/a	n/a	0	654
2006	511	107	1	9	1	n/a	n/a	8	637
2007	503	120	1	15	0	n/a	n/a	6	645
2008	457	108	2	19	1	n/a	n/a	9	596
2009	426	105	2	23	1	n/a	n/a	11	568
2010	440	104	4	21	2	n/a	n/a	10	581
2011	421	101	3	26	1	0	28	0	580
2012	441	94	3	28	0	0	31	0	597
2013	440	89	4	37	1	0	26	0	597
2014	456	91	1	38	0	0	25	0	611
2015	444	93	5	44	0	0	23	0	609
2016	481	90	5	45	0	0	22	0	643
2017	471	86	5	41	0	0	22	0	625
2018	485	80	5	38	2	0	26	0	636
2019	474	81	3	46	1	0	27	0	632
2020	417	76	1	44	3	0	33	0	574
2021	405	78	0	47	2	0	38	0	570
2022	395	76	0	40	2	0	32	0	545
