= Thomas Nelson House (Peekskill, New York) =

Historic house in New York, United States

- U.S. National Register of Historic Places
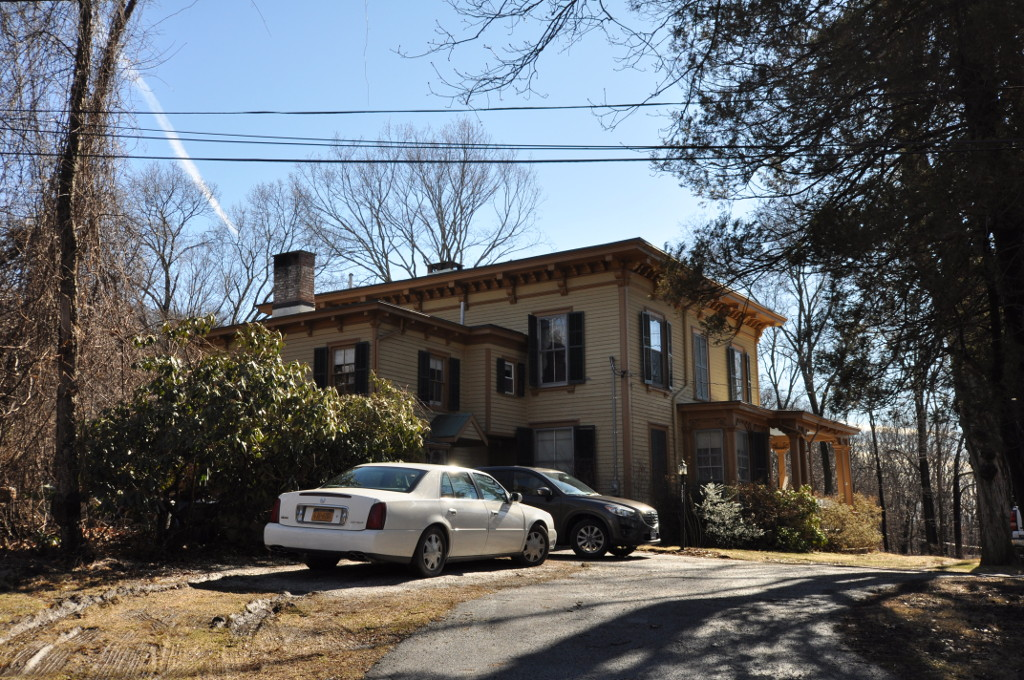

- Location within New York Location within the United States
- Location: 1231 Seymour Ln., Peekskill, New York
- Coordinates: 41°17′48″N 73°54′49″W
- Area: 1.7 acres (0.69 ha)
- Built: c. 1860
- Architectural style: Italianate
- NRHP reference No.: 01000846
- Added to NRHP: August 8, 2001

Thomas Nelson House is a historic home located at Peekskill, Westchester County, New York. It was built about 1860 and is a two-story, frame dwelling with a slightly hipped roof in the Italianate style. It has a two-story rear wing. It is clad in clapboard and sits on a stone and brick foundation. It features a one-story, open front porch with scrolled brackets, paired posts, and bracketed eaves. Also on the property is a contributing well house.

It was added to the National Register of Historic Places in 2001.
