= John R. Nelson House =

Historic house in Massachusetts, United States

- U.S. National Register of Historic Places
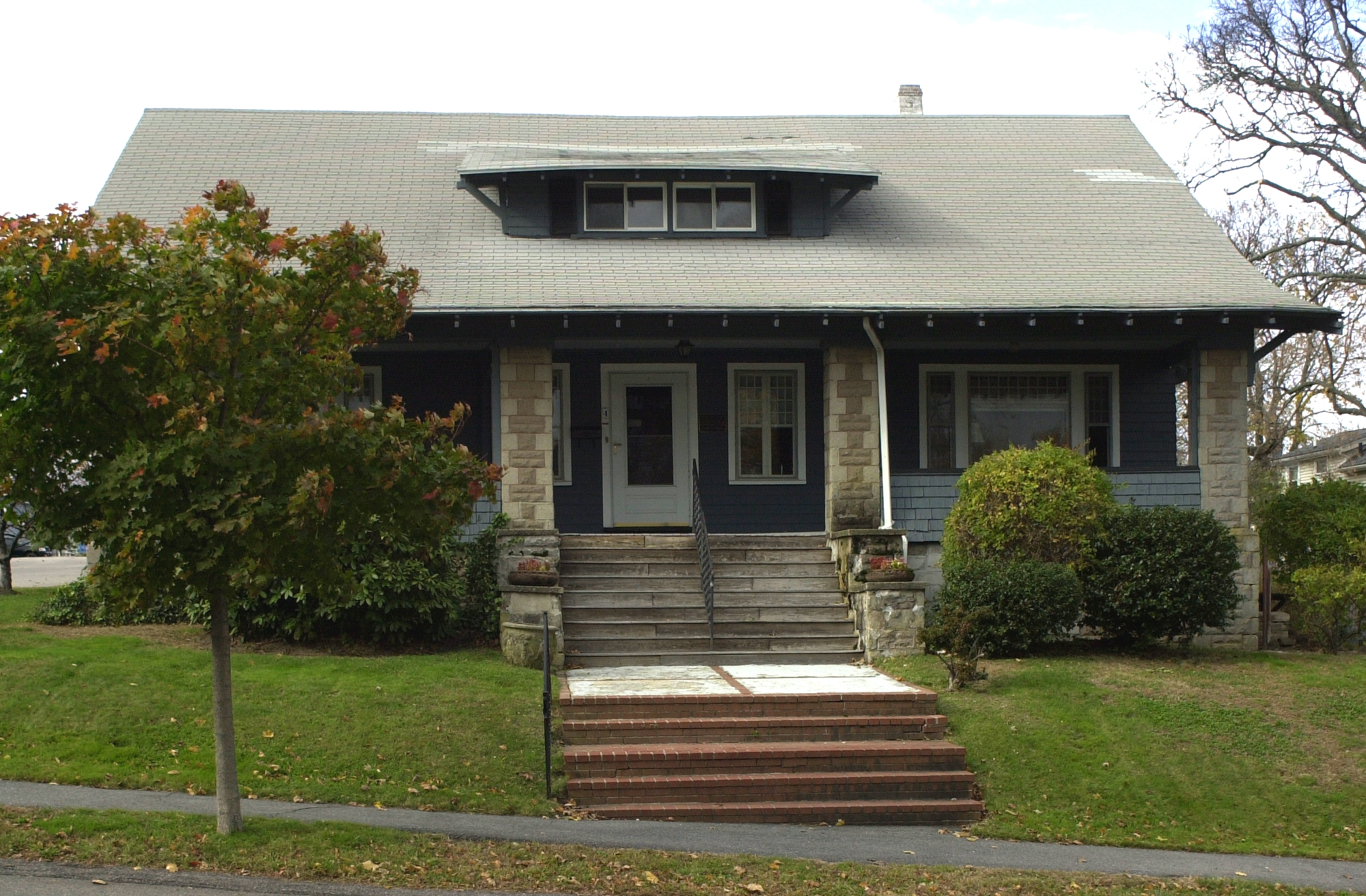

- Location within Massachusetts Location within the United States
- Location: 4 Brunswick Street, Quincy, Massachusetts
- Coordinates: 42°17′52″N 71°0′30.3″W
- Area: 0.2 acres (0.081 ha)
- Built: 1908
- Architectural style: Bungalow/Craftsman
- MPS: Quincy MRA
- NRHP reference No.: 89001321
- Added to NRHP: September 20, 1989

The John R. Nelson House is a historic house located at 4 Brunswick Street in Quincy, Massachusetts.

== Description and history ==
The 1 1/2-story timber-framed house was built in 1908 as a summer house by John R. Nelson, who was one of the developers of the Squantum farms. It is one of the area's best-preserved Craftsman/Bungalow homes. It has a side gable roof with broad eaves showing exposed rafter ends, which also extends over the front porch, where it is supported by stone piers.

The house was listed on the National Register of Historic Places on September 20, 1989.

== Gallery ==
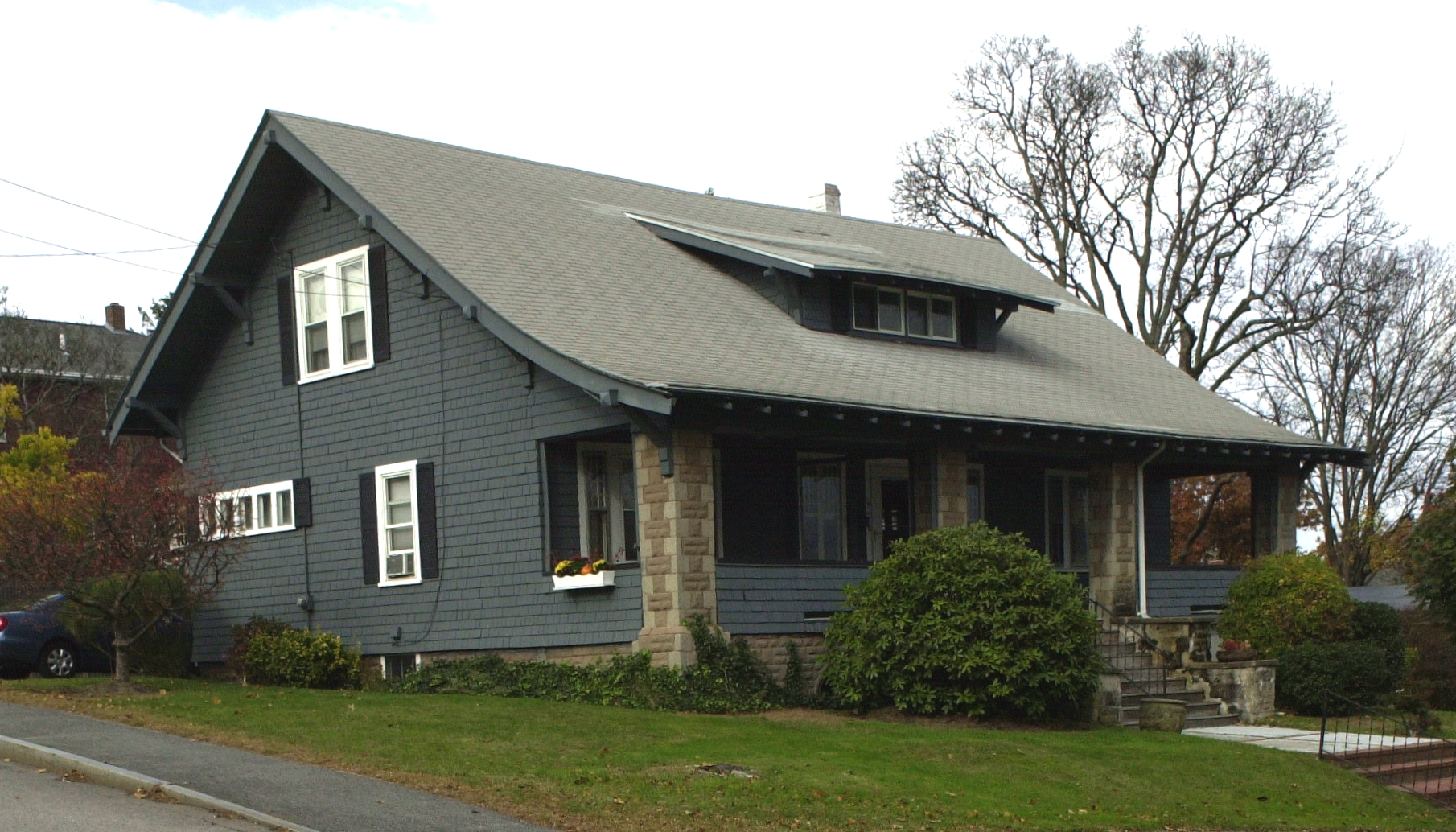

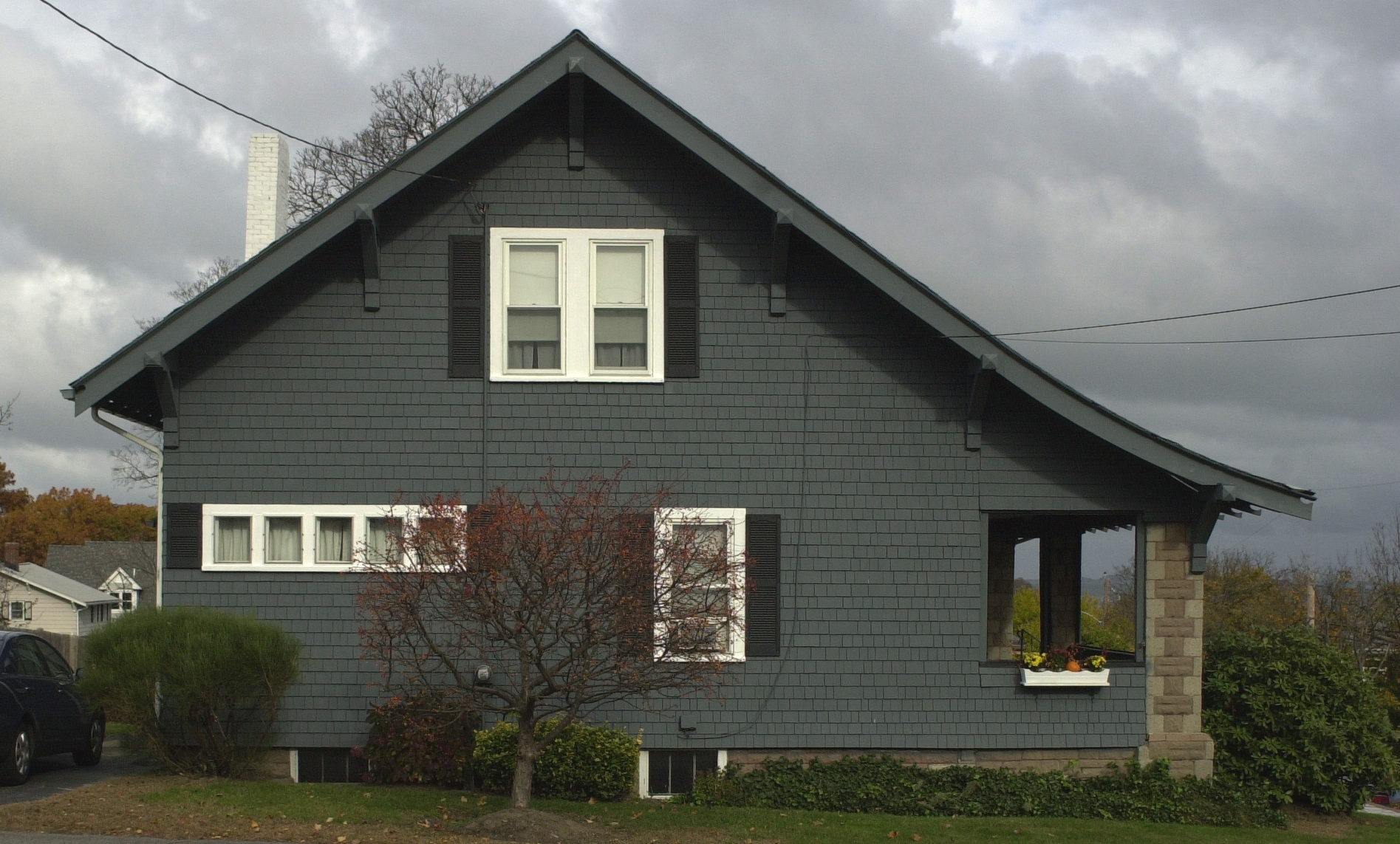

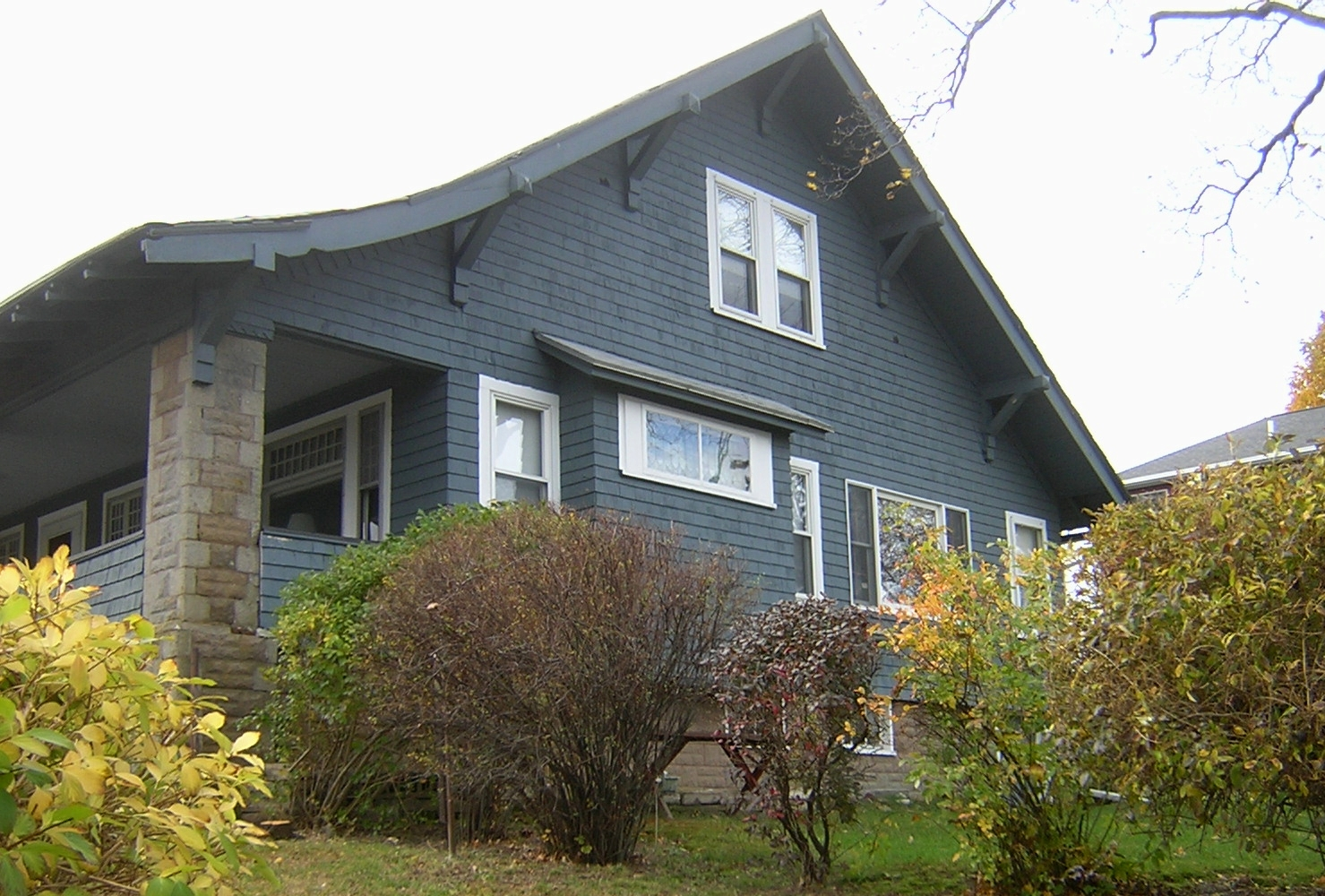

== See also ==
- National Register of Historic Places listings in Quincy, Massachusetts
