= Nelson's Island =

Island in Egypt

Coordinates: 31.3585°N 30.1062°E

- Interactive map of Nelson's Island

Nelson's Island (Arabic: جزيرة جريشة or جزيرة نيلسون) is an island located in Abū Qīr Bay, off the coast of Alexandria, Egypt. It is a local site for picnics and recreation, and is the location of a group of British graves dating from the Napoleonic Wars. It was named after Horatio Nelson, the famous British admiral.

In 2000, Italian archaeologist Dr Paolo Gallo discovered a series of graves on the island. Further digging and research (in collaboration with British historian Nick Slope) determined that the graves dated from the 1798 Battle of the Nile, and another land battle in 1801. The remains of British officers, sailors, marines, women, and children were uncovered.

On 18 April 2005 the remains of thirty Royal Navy sailors and officers recovered from the island were buried at Chatby Commonwealth War Cemetery in Alexandria. Only one body, that of Master and Commander James Russell, was positively identified. The interment was attended by Sir Derek Plumbly KCMG, the then British Ambassador to Egypt; Alan Cobden, HM Consul-General to Alexandria at the time; General Abdel Salam El Mahgoub, the Governor of Alexandria; members of the crew of HMS Chatham, and a descendant of Commander Russell.
