= 1923 Portsmouth South by-election =

UK parliamentary by-election

← 1922	13 August 1923	1923 →

Candidate	Cayzer	Lawson
Party	Unionist	Liberal
Popular vote	11,884	9,763
Percentage	54.9%	45.1%
MP before election
Wilson
Unionist
Subsequent MP
Cayzer
Unionist

The 1923 Portsmouth South by-election was a parliamentary by-election held in England on 13 August 1923 to elect a new Member of Parliament (MP) for the UK House of Commons constituency of Portsmouth South in Hampshire.

== Vacancy ==
The seat had become vacant when the constituency's Conservative MP Leslie Orme Wilson had been appointed as Governor of Bombay, and had therefore resigned from the Commons on 26 July by the procedural device of accepting appointment as Steward of the Manor of Northstead. Wilson had held the seat for less than a year, having won it at a by-election in December 1922. He had previously been the MP for Reading from 1913 to 1922.

== Electoral history ==
The result at the last election was:

1922 Portsmouth South by-election
Party	Candidate	Votes	%	±%
Unionist	Leslie Orme Wilson	14,301	62.9	−5.8
Ind. Unionist	G. C. Thomas	4,834	37.1	New
Majority		5,867	25.8	−11.6
Turnout		22,735	57.7	
Unionist hold		Swing		

== Candidates ==
Sir Henry Lawson

- The Conservative candidate was Herbert Cayzer, who had held the seat from the 1918 general election until his resignation on 27 November 1922, only two weeks after being returned at the general election in November 1922.
- The Liberal Party candidate was 64-year-old retired army general, Sir Henry Lawson, who had previously contested the seat unsuccessfully at the 1922 general election.

== Result ==
Portsmouth South by-election, 1923
Party	Candidate	Votes	%	±%
Unionist	Herbert Cayzer	11,884	54.9	−8.0
Liberal	Henry Merrick Lawson	9,763	45.1	New
Majority		2,121	9.8	−14.0
Turnout		21,647	54.9	−2.8
Unionist hold		Swing		

== Aftermath ==
Cayzer was re-elected for Portsmouth South at the next five general elections, and held the seat until he was ennobled in 1939. Lawson never stood for Parliament again. The result at the following general election;

1923 general election: Portsmouth South
Party	Candidate	Votes	%	±%
Unionist	Herbert Cayzer	16,625	55.9	+1.0
Labour	J. Stephen	7,388	24.9	New
Liberal	Sidney Robert Drury-Lowe	5,698	19.2	−25.9
Majority		9,237	31.0	+21.2
Turnout		29,711	72.7	+17.8
Unionist hold		Swing		

== See also ==
- Portsmouth South (UK Parliament constituency)
- 1922 Portsmouth South by-election
- 1939 Portsmouth South by-election
- 1984 Portsmouth South by-election
- The city of Portsmouth
- List of United Kingdom by-elections
