= Patrick Rock =

British political aide and convicted sex offender

- Born: Patrick Robert John Rock de Besombes; 17 November 1951 (age 74); Kensington, London, England
- Education: Stonyhurst College; Worcester College, Oxford
- Occupation: Political aide to the Prime Minister
- Employer: British government
- Conviction: 1 June 2016 (guilty verdict) of possessing and downloading indecent images of children
- Criminal charges: Making indecent images of children, possession of indecent images of children
- Penalty: two-year conditional discharge

Patrick Robert John Rock de Besombes (born 17 November 1951) is a former British political aide, special adviser and convicted sex offender. He was deputy director of policy to David Cameron, Prime Minister and leader of the Conservative Party in the United Kingdom, until he was forced to resign in 2014 over allegations of making and possessing indecent images of children, for which he was later convicted.

== Early life ==
Educated at Stonyhurst College and Worcester College, Oxford, where he studied Modern History, he was widely credited in Westminster with coining the phrase 'Cows moo, dogs bark, Labour puts up taxes.'

== Political career ==
At the age of 28 he stood unsuccessfully for the Woolwich East constituency in the 1979 General election and was also unsuccessful, albeit rather narrowly, in Crewe and Nantwich in 1983.

In 1984 the sitting MP for the Portsmouth South constituency, Bonner Pink, died, causing a by-election. At the time the Conservative Party had a majority of over 12,000. Rock was selected as Conservative Party candidate; he was defeated by 1,341 votes by the Social Democratic Party candidate Mike Hancock, leading to his defeat being described as the 'biggest election [upset in] years'

Rock tried one last time to become a Conservative MP. In 1990 he attempted to be selected as the Conservative candidate for Devizes but lost out to former Conservative MP Michael Ancram QC, who was elected in 1992.

== Special advisor ==
After his unsuccessful attempts at becoming an MP, Rock became an advisor to various Ministers during the 1990s, including Michael Howard and also Chris Patten in Brussels, where he was given responsibility for the Western Balkans.

In 2011, David Cameron brought him into his government by appointing him as his 10 Downing Street Deputy Director of Policy.

== Child pornography allegations, trial and conviction ==
In March 2014 it was discovered that he had been arrested on suspicion of an offence relating to child pornography.

Rock was charged, in June 2014, with three counts of making an indecent photograph of a child in August 2013. He was also charged with possession of 59 indecent images of children.

In December 2014 he pleaded not guilty to six charges of making indecent photographs of children aged between 10 and 13 and one charge of possessing 56 indecent images of children aged between 10 and 14.

He appeared at Southwark Crown Court on Friday 16 October 2015, where according to tweets issued by ExaroNews, 'Judge Alistair McCreath ... granted Patrick Rock bail until trial date in May 2016 (30th).

He admitted downloading images of 20 young girls, but denied that they were indecent. The images showed the girls in sexualised poses, in bikinis or bras, but not engaged in sexual activity. On 1 June 2016 he was found guilty of possessing and downloading indecent images of children. He was acquitted of 3 charges, and the jury was unable to reach a verdict on 12 charges. He was given a two-year conditional discharge, the judge saying that his punishment for the offence was "his very public humiliation".

Commenting in the Daily Telegraph, Joan Smith pointed out that his youngest victim, now 10, would have been even younger 2 years ago when the offences were committed and that his government duties had included devising policies to make the internet safer for children. Smith expressed astonishment that Rock would not spend a single night in prison and said his upper class status protected him.

Rock was appointed an Officer of the Order of the British Empire (OBE) in the 1993 New Year Honours, which was subsequently revoked in 2017.
