= Northamptonshire (disambiguation) =

Northamptonshire is a county in the East Midlands of England.

Northamptonshire may also refer to:

- Northamptonshire (European Parliament constituency)
- Northamptonshire (UK Parliament constituency)
