= Portsmouth South =

Parliamentary constituency in the United Kingdom, 1918 onwards

Coordinates: 50.792°N 1.075°W

- Borough constituency for the House of Commons
- Boundaries since 2010
- Boundary of Portsmouth South in South East England
- County: Hampshire
- Electorate: 73,711 (2024)
- Major settlements: Southsea; Fratton; HMNB Portsmouth

Current constituency
- Created: 1918
- Member of Parliament: Stephen Morgan (Labour)
- Seats: One
- Created from: Portsmouth

Portsmouth South is a constituency (Note: A borough constituency (for the purposes of election expenses and type of returning officer)) represented in the House of Commons of the UK Parliament since 2017 by Stephen Morgan of the Labour Party. Morgan is the first Labour MP to represent the seat.

== Constituency profile ==
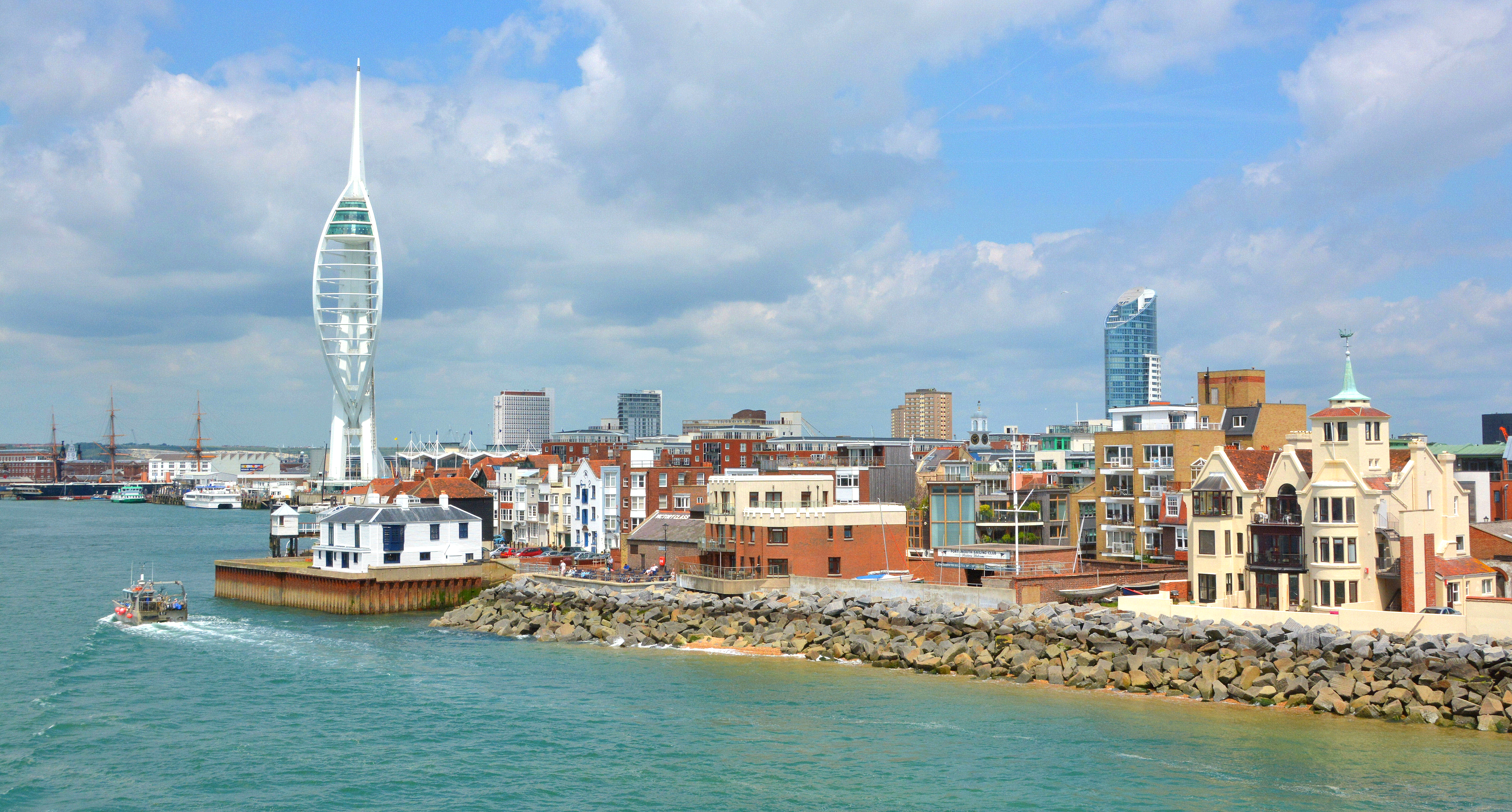
Spinnaker Tower and the district of Old Portsmouth

Portsmouth South is a constituency in Hampshire in South East England. It covers the southern half of Portsea Island, including Portsmouth city centre and the neighbourhoods of Somerstown, Southsea, Eastney, Milton, Fratton and Buckland.

Portsmouth is a port city with a maritime history. Its importance as a naval base and centre for shipbuilding made it the most heavily fortified city in the world in the early 19th century. HMNB Portsmouth in the west of the constituency is the home base of most of the Royal Navy's surface fleet. Much of the city centre was destroyed by the Luftwaffe during World War II and underwent post-war redevelopment with a high quantity of council housing. Today, this area is highly-deprived. Southsea is a popular seaside resort; this area and its surroundings are wealthier than the city centre and mostly consist of dense Victorian and Edwardian terraces. House prices across the constituency are generally lower than the national average and considerably lower than the rest of South East England.

Portsmouth South has a low proportion of older adults and a large student population; the constituency contains the University of Portsmouth which has around 24,000 students. Residents have low levels of income and homeownership and the child poverty rate is above-average. They are generally well-educated and a high proportion work in the education, tourism and defence sectors. The percentage of residents claiming unemployment benefits is above-average. White people made up 81% of the population at the 2021 census. Asians were 9% of residents, with people of Bangladeshi origin being the largest Asian group.

At the local city council, most of the constituency is represented by Liberal Democrats with some Labour Party and Reform UK councillors elected in the city centre. An estimated 51% of voters in Portsmouth South supported leaving the European Union in the 2016 referendum, similar to the UK-wide rate of 52%.

== Boundaries ==
1918–1950: The County Borough of Portsmouth wards of Havelock, Highland, St Paul, St Simon, and St Thomas.

1950–1955: The County Borough of Portsmouth wards of Havelock, Highland, Kingston, St Paul, St Simon, and St Thomas.

1955–1974: The County Borough of Portsmouth wards of Havelock, Highland, Kingston, St Jude, St Simon, and St Thomas.

1974–1983: The County Borough of Portsmouth wards of Buckland, Fratton, Havelock, Highland, Kingston, St Jude, St Simon, and St Thomas.

1983–2010: The City of Portsmouth wards of Charles Dickens, Fratton, Havelock, Highland, Milton, St Jude, and St Thomas.

2010–present: The City of Portsmouth wards of Central Southsea, Charles Dickens, Eastney and Craneswater, Fratton, Milton, St Jude, and St Thomas.

The 2023 review of Westminster constituencies left the boundaries unchanged.

== History ==
The constituency was created in 1918 when the larger Portsmouth constituency was split into three divisions: Central, North and South. The Portsmouth Central constituency was abolished in 1950.

During the 2010 general election campaign, independent candidate Les Cummings distributed a leaflet claiming that sitting MP Mike Hancock was a paedophile, which was later proven in court to be false. Cummings was subsequently convicted under the Representation of the People Act 1983 for distributing material which was known to be false with the intention of smearing or defaming to affect the return of a member of parliament, and was fined £500 as a result.

Stephen Morgan won the seat at the 2017 general election, the first time ever that the Labour Party held the seat. Morgan's win was one of 30 net gains made by Labour at that election. At the 2019 general election Labour increased its vote share by 7.6%. This was the second-highest increase in Labour vote share in any seat in the United Kingdom (after Bradford West) in an election where Labour's vote share fell in all but 13 constituencies.

Morgan's vote share remained steady in the 2024 election, with the Conservatives falling significantly behind both Labour and Reform. Portsmouth South can be considered a safe Labour seat. From a high of 45.9% in 2010, the Lib Dems are now in fourth position in a seat they held between 1997 and 2015, despite holding the majority of councillors in this constituency.

== Members of Parliament ==
Portsmouth prior to 1918

Election	Member	Party
1918	Herbert Cayzer	Conservative
1922 by-election	Leslie Wilson	Conservative
1923 by-election	Herbert Cayzer	Conservative
1939 by-election	Jocelyn Lucas	Conservative
1966	Bonner Pink	Conservative
1984 by-election	Mike Hancock	SDP
1987	David Martin	Conservative
1997	Mike Hancock	Liberal Democrat
2013	Mike Hancock	Independent
2015	Flick Drummond	Conservative
2017	Stephen Morgan	Labour

== Elections ==
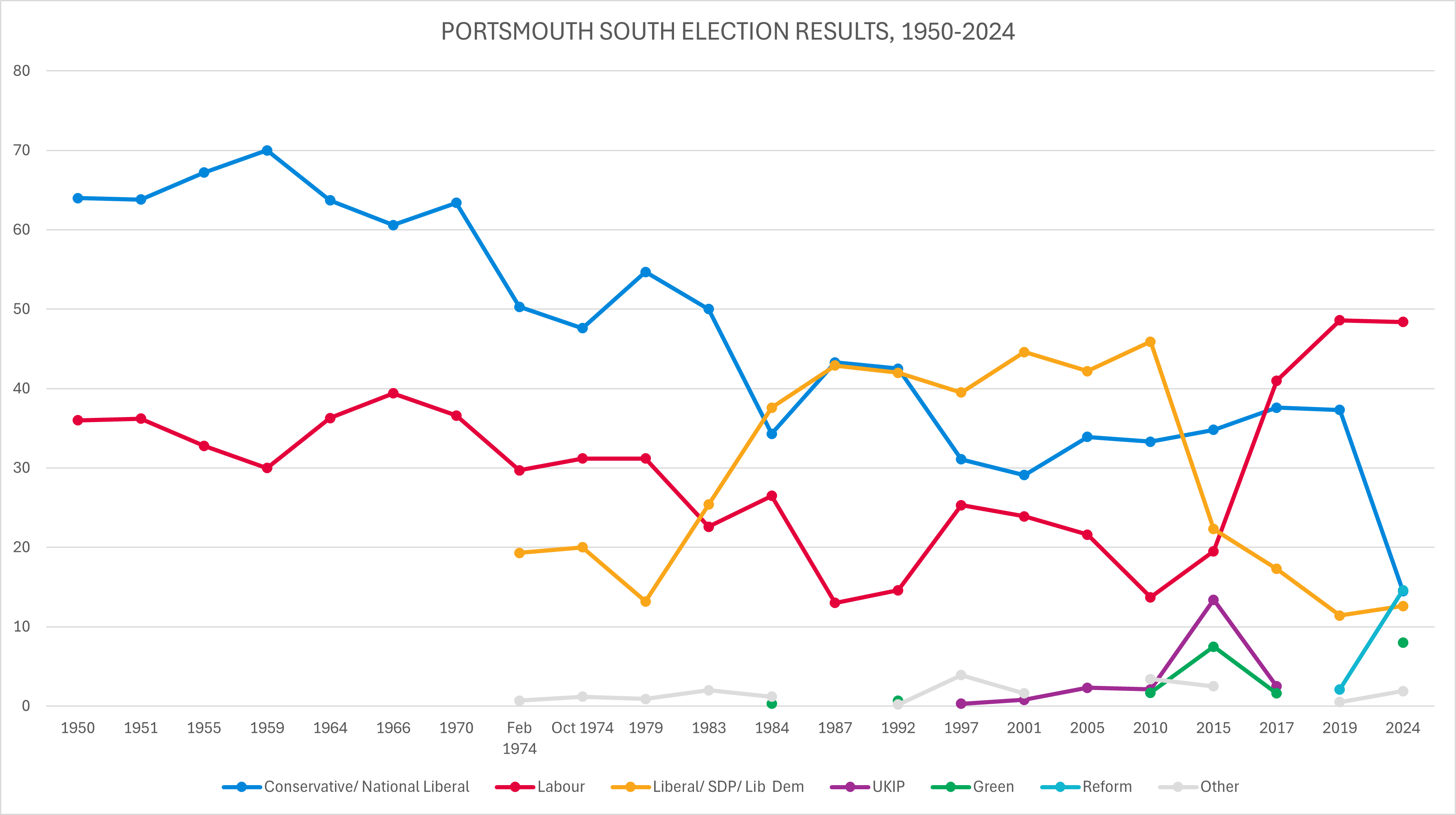
Election results 1950-2024

=== Elections in the 2020s ===
General election 2024: Portsmouth South
Party	Candidate	Votes	%	±%
Labour	Stephen Morgan	18,857	48.4	−0.2
Reform	Mark Zimmer	5,702	14.6	+12.6
Conservative	Signe Biddle	5,643	14.5	−22.8
Liberal Democrats	Charlie Murphy	4,886	12.6	+1.1
Green	Elliott Lee	3,107	8.0	N/A
PIP	Jacob Short	733	1.9	N/A
Majority		13,155	33.8	+22.5
Turnout		38,928	52.8	−11.1
Registered electors		73,711		
Labour hold		Swing	−6.4	

=== Elections in the 2010s ===
General election 2019: Portsmouth South
Party	Candidate	Votes	%	±%
Labour	Stephen Morgan	23,068	48.6	+7.6
Conservative	Donna Jones	17,705	37.3	−0.2
Liberal Democrats	Gerald Vernon-Jackson	5,418	11.4	−5.9
Brexit Party	John Kennedy	994	2.1	N/A
JAC	Steven George	240	0.5	N/A
Majority		5,363	11.3	+7.9
Turnout		47,425	63.9	±0.0
Registered electors		74,186		
Labour hold		Swing	+3.9	

General election 2017: Portsmouth South
Party	Candidate	Votes	%	±%
Labour	Stephen Morgan	18,290	41.0	+21.5
Conservative	Flick Drummond	16,736	37.6	+2.7
Liberal Democrats	Gerald Vernon-Jackson	7,699	17.3	−5.0
UKIP	Kevan Chippindall-Higgin	1,129	2.5	−10.8
Green	Ian McCulloch	712	1.6	−5.9
Majority		1,554	3.5	N/A
Turnout		44,566	63.9	+5.4
Registered electors		69,785		
Labour gain from Conservative		Swing	+9.4	

General election 2015: Portsmouth South
Party	Candidate	Votes	%	±%
Conservative	Flick Drummond	14,585	34.8	+1.6
Liberal Democrats	Gerald Vernon-Jackson	9,344	22.3	−23.6
Labour	Sue Castillon	8,184	19.5	+5.9
UKIP	Steve Harris	5,595	13.4	+11.2
Green	Ian McCulloch	3,145	7.5	+5.8
Independent	Mike Hancock	716	1.7	N/A
TUSC	Sean Hoyle	235	0.6	N/A
JAC	Don Jerrard	99	0.2	±0.0
Majority		5,241	12.5	N/A
Turnout		41,903	58.5	−0.3
Registered electors		71,639		
Conservative gain from Liberal Democrats		Swing	+12.6	

General election 2010: Portsmouth South
Party	Candidate	Votes	%	±%
Liberal Democrats	Mike Hancock	18,921	45.9	+3.5
Conservative	Flick Drummond	13,721	33.3	−0.3
Labour	John Ferrett	5,640	13.7	−8.6
UKIP	Robert Robinson	876	2.1	+0.2
BNP	Geoff Crompton	873	2.1	N/A
Green	Tim Dawes	716	1.7	N/A
English Democrat	Ian Ducain	400	1.0	N/A
JAC	Les Cummings	117	0.3	N/A
Majority		5,200	12.6	+3.8
Turnout		41,264	58.7	+1.8
Registered electors		70,242		
Liberal Democrats hold		Swing	+1.9	

=== Elections in the 2000s ===
2005 notional result
Party	Vote	%
Liberal Democrats	15,652	42.3
Conservative	12,394	33.5
Labour	8,228	22.2
Others	714	1.9
Turnout	36,988	56.9
Electorate	64,981	

General election 2005: Portsmouth South
Party	Candidate	Votes	%	±%
Liberal Democrats	Mike Hancock	17,047	42.2	−2.4
Conservative	Caroline Dinenage	13,685	33.9	+4.8
Labour	Mark Button	8,714	21.6	−2.3
UKIP	Dennis Pierson	928	2.3	+1.5
Majority		3,362	8.3	−7.2
Turnout		40,374	56.9	+6.0
Registered electors		70,969		
Liberal Democrats hold		Swing	−3.6	

General election 2001: Portsmouth South
Party	Candidate	Votes	%	±%
Liberal Democrats	Mike Hancock	17,490	44.6	+5.1
Conservative	Philip Warr	11,396	29.1	−2.1
Labour	Graham Heaney	9,361	23.9	−1.4
Socialist Alliance	Jonathan Molyneux	647	1.6	N/A
UKIP	Michael Tarrant	321	0.8	+0.5
Majority		6,094	15.5	+7.2
Turnout		39,215	50.9	−12.9
Registered electors		77,095		
Liberal Democrats hold		Swing	+3.6	

=== Elections in the 1990s ===
General election 1997: Portsmouth South
Party	Candidate	Votes	%	±%
Liberal Democrats	Mike Hancock	20,421	39.5	−2.5
Conservative	David Martin	16,094	31.1	−11.4
Labour	Alan Burnett	13,086	25.3	+10.7
Referendum	Christopher Trim	1,629	3.2	N/A
Liberal	John Thompson	184	0.4	N/A
UKIP	Jill Evans	141	0.3	N/A
Natural Law	William Trend	140	0.3	+0.1
Majority		4,327	8.4	N/A
Turnout		51,695	63.8	−5.3
Registered electors		81,014		
Liberal Democrats gain from Conservative		Swing	+4.4	

General election 1992: Portsmouth South
Party	Candidate	Votes	%	±%
Conservative	David Martin	22,798	42.5	−0.8
Liberal Democrats	Mike Hancock	22,556	42.0	−0.9
Labour	Syd Rapson	7,857	14.6	+1.7
Green	Aleksander Zivkovic	349	0.7	N/A
Natural Law	William Trend	91	0.2	N/A
Majority		242	0.5	+0.1
Turnout		53,651	69.1	−2.2
Registered electors		77,645		
Conservative hold		Swing	±0.0	

=== Elections in the 1980s ===
General election 1987: Portsmouth South
Party	Candidate	Votes	%	±%
Conservative	David Martin	23,534	43.3	−6.7
SDP (Alliance)	Mike Hancock	23,329	42.9	+17.5
Labour	Keith Gardiner	7,047	13.0	−9.6
657 Party	Martyn Hughes	455	0.8	N/A
Majority		205	0.4	N/A
Turnout		54,365	71.3	+3.9
Registered electors		76,292		
Conservative gain from SDP		Swing	-12.1	

1984 Portsmouth South by-election
Party	Candidate	Votes	%	±%
SDP (Alliance)	Mike Hancock	15,358	37.6	+12.1
Conservative	Patrick Rock	14,017	34.3	−15.7
Labour	Sally Thomas	10,846	26.5	+4.0
National Front	Gordon Knight	226	0.6	±0.0
Ecology	Terry Mitchell	190	0.5	N/A
Independent Liberal	Alan Evens	113	0.3	−0.8
Independent Ecology	Thomas Layton	50	0.1	N/A
Independent	Anthony Andrews	42	0.1	N/A
New National Party	Peter Smith	41	0.1	N/A
Majority		1,341	3.3	N/A
Turnout		40,523	54.5	−12.8
Registered electors		74,976		
SDP gain from Conservative		Swing	+13.9	

General election 1983: Portsmouth South
Party	Candidate	Votes	%	±%
Conservative	Bonner Pink	25,101	50.0	−3.8
SDP (Alliance)	Mike Hancock	12,766	25.4	+13.2
Labour	Sally Thomas	11,324	22.6	−10.5
Independent Liberal	Alan Evens	554	1.1	N/A
National Front	Gordon Knight	279	0.6	−0.3
Traditional English Food	D. W. Fry	172	0.3	N/A
Majority		12,335	24.6	+3.8
Turnout		50,196	67.3	
Registered electors		74,537		
Conservative hold		Swing	−8.5	

=== Elections in the 1970s ===
1979 notional result
Party	Vote	%
Conservative	28,990	53.8
Labour	17,813	33.1
Liberal	6,566	12.2
Others	485	0.9
Turnout	53,854	
Electorate		

General election 1979: Portsmouth South
Party	Candidate	Votes	%	±%
Conservative	Bonner Pink	26,835	54.7	+7.1
Labour	Sally Thomas	15,306	31.2	±0.0
Liberal	Jack Wallis	6,487	13.2	−6.8
National Front	W. Donkin	457	0.9	N/A
Majority		11,529	23.5	+7.1
Turnout		49,085	72.9	+3.5
Registered electors		67,346		
Conservative hold		Swing	+3.5	

General election October 1974: Portsmouth South
Party	Candidate	Votes	%	±%
Conservative	Bonner Pink	23,379	47.6	−2.7
Labour	A. M. Halmos	15,308	31.2	+1.5
Liberal	M. Tribe	9,807	20.0	+0.7
Marxist-Leninist (England)	A. D. Rifkin	612	1.2	+0.5
Majority		8,071	16.4	−4.1
Turnout		49,106	69.4	−6.5
Registered electors		70,773		
Conservative hold		Swing	−2.1	

General election February 1974: Portsmouth South
Party	Candidate	Votes	%	±%
Conservative	Bonner Pink	26,824	50.3	−10.3
Labour	S. Lloyd	15,842	29.7	−9.8
Liberal	John Williams	10,307	19.3	N/A
Marxist-Leninist (England)	A. D. Rifkin	394	0.7	N/A
Majority		10,982	20.6	−0.5
Turnout		53,367	75.9	+8.1
Registered electors		70,345		
Conservative hold		Swing	−0.2	

1970 notional result
Party	Vote	%
Conservative	29,600	60.5
Labour	19,300	39.5
Turnout	48,900	67.7
Electorate	72,213	

General election 1970: Portsmouth South
Party	Candidate	Votes	%	±%
Conservative	Bonner Pink	23,962	63.4	+2.7
Labour	John White	13,847	36.6	−2.7
Majority		10,115	26.8	+5.5
Turnout		37,809	67.4	−3.4
Registered electors		56,126		
Conservative hold		Swing	+2.7	

=== Elections in the 1960s ===
General election 1966: Portsmouth South
Party	Candidate	Votes	%	±%
Conservative	Bonner Pink	22,713	60.6	−3.0
Labour	Patten Bridge Smith	14,738	39.4	+3.0
Majority		7,975	21.3	−6.1
Turnout		37,451	70.7	−0.3
Registered electors		52,941		
Conservative hold		Swing	−3.0	

General election 1964: Portsmouth South
Party	Candidate	Votes	%	±%
Conservative	Jocelyn Lucas	24,387	63.7	−6.3
Labour	Richard Pryke	13,904	36.3	+6.3
Majority		10,483	27.4	−12.5
Turnout		38,291	71.0	−1.3
Registered electors		53,915		
Conservative hold		Swing	−6.3	

=== Elections in the 1950s ===
General election 1959: Portsmouth South
Party	Candidate	Votes	%	±%
Conservative	Jocelyn Lucas	27,892	70.0	+2.7
Labour	Frank Towell	11,979	30.0	−2.7
Majority		15,913	39.9	+5.5
Turnout		39,871	72.3	−0.1
Registered electors		55,121		
Conservative hold		Swing	+2.7	

General election 1955: Portsmouth South
Party	Candidate	Votes	%	±%
Conservative	Jocelyn Lucas	27,887	67.2	+3.4
Labour	Lawrence W. Carroll	13,600	32.8	−3.4
Majority		14,287	34.4	+6.8
Turnout		41,487	72.4	−8.4
Registered electors		57,311		
Conservative hold		Swing	+3.4	

General election 1951: Portsmouth South
Party	Candidate	Votes	%	±%
Conservative	Jocelyn Lucas	30,548	63.8	−0.2
Labour	Douglas Wallace	17,350	36.2	+0.2
Majority		13,198	27.6	−0.2
Turnout		47,898	80.8	−2.7
Registered electors		59,306		
Conservative hold		Swing	−0.2	

General election 1950: Portsmouth South
Party	Candidate	Votes	%	±%
Conservative	Jocelyn Lucas	31,124	64.0	
Labour	Leslie Merrion	17,545	36.0	
Majority		13,579	27.9	
Turnout		48,669	83.5	
Registered electors		58,288		
Conservative win (new boundaries)				

=== Elections in the 1940s ===
General election 1945: Portsmouth South (Note: Results compared to the 1935 general election, not the 1939 by-election)
Party	Candidate	Votes	%	±%
Conservative	Jocelyn Lucas	15,810	55.3	−19.9
Labour	J. F. Blitz	12,783	44.7	+19.9
Majority		3,027	10.6	−39.8
Turnout		28,593	74.9	+8.0
Registered electors		38,150		
Conservative hold		Swing	−19.9	

=== Elections in the 1930s ===
1939 Portsmouth South by-election
Party	Candidate	Votes	%	±%
Conservative	Jocelyn Lucas	Unopposed		
Conservative hold				

General election 1935: Portsmouth South
Party	Candidate	Votes	%	±%
Conservative	Herbert Cayzer	27,416	75.20	−5.68
Labour	John W. Fawcett	9,043	24.80	+5.68
Majority		18,373	50.40	−11.36
Turnout		36,459	66.94	−5.78
Registered electors		54,463		
Conservative hold		Swing	−5.68	

General election 1931: Portsmouth South
Party	Candidate	Votes	%	±%
Conservative	Herbert Cayzer	32,634	80.88	+44.06
Labour	W. J. Beck	7,715	19.12	−5.63
Majority		24,919	61.76	+49.68
Turnout		40,349	72.72	−2.42
Registered electors		55,488		
Conservative hold		Swing	+24.85	

=== Elections in the 1920s ===
General election 1929: Portsmouth South
Party	Candidate	Votes	%	±%
Conservative	Herbert Cayzer	15,068	36.82	−36.14
Labour	Jessie Stephen	10,127	24.75	−2.29
Ind. Conservative	Frank Privett	9,505	23.23	N/A
Liberal	Charles Rudkin	6,214	15.19	N/A
Majority		4,941	12.07	−33.84
Turnout		40,914	75.14	+0.94
Registered electors		54,449		
Conservative hold		Swing		

General election 1924: Portsmouth South
Party	Candidate	Votes	%	±%
Conservative	Herbert Cayzer	22,423	72.96	+17.00
Labour	Jessie Stephen	8,310	27.04	+2.17
Majority		14,113	45.92	+14.83
Turnout		30,733	74.20	+1.48
Registered electors		41,417		
Conservative hold		Swing	+7.42	

General election 1923: Portsmouth South (Note: Results compared to the 1922 general election, not the 1922 or the 1923 by-elections)
Party	Candidate	Votes	%	±%
Conservative	Herbert Cayzer	16,625	55.96	−12.77
Labour	Jessie Stephen	7,388	24.87	N/A
Liberal	Sidney Robert Drury-Lowe	5,698	19.18	−12.09
Majority		9,237	31.09	−6.38
Turnout		29,711	72.72	−1.94
Registered electors		40,854		
Conservative hold		Swing	−18.82	

1923 Portsmouth South by-election (Note: Results compared to the 1922 general election, not the 1922 by-election)
Party	Candidate	Votes	%	±%
Conservative	Herbert Cayzer	11,884	54.90	−13.83
Liberal	Henry Merrick Lawson	9,763	45.10	N/A
Majority		2,121	9.80	−17.66
Turnout		21,647	54.90	−18.76
Registered electors		39,426		
Conservative hold		Swing		

1922 Portsmouth South by-election
Party	Candidate	Votes	%	±%
Conservative	Leslie Wilson	14,301	62.90	−5.83
Ind. Conservative	G. C. Thomas	8,434	37.10	N/A
Majority		5,867	25.80	−11.66
Turnout		22,735	57.66	−16.00
Registered electors		39,426		
Conservative hold		Swing		

General election 1922: Portsmouth South
Party	Candidate	Votes	%	±%
Conservative	Herbert Cayzer	19,960	68.73	+0.43
Liberal	Henry Merrick Lawson	9,080	31.27	+12.80
Majority		10,880	37.46	−12.37
Turnout		29,040	73.66	+11.69
Registered electors		39,426		
Conservative hold		Swing	−6.19	

=== Elections in the 1910s ===
General election 1918: Portsmouth South
Party		Candidate	Votes	%	±%
C	Unionist	Herbert Cayzer	15,842	68.3	
	Liberal	Alison Vickers Garland	4,283	18.5	
	Labour	James Lacey	3,070	13.2	
Majority			11,559	49.8	
Turnout			23,195	61.97	
Registered electors			37,427		
	Unionist win (new seat)				
C indicates candidate endorsed by the coalition government.

== See also ==
- List of parliamentary constituencies in Hampshire
- List of parliamentary constituencies in the South East England (region)
