= Henry Lawson (British Army officer) =

British Army general (1859–1933)

Lieutenant-general Sir Henry Lawson KCB
- Lawson in 1933
- Born: 30 January 1859; Dublin, County Dublin, Ireland
- Died: 2 November 1933 (aged 74)
- Military career
- Allegiance: United Kingdom
- Branch: British Army
- Service years: 1877–1921
- Rank: Lieutenant-general
- Unit: Royal Engineers
- Commands: Northern Command; Guernsey and Alderney; 2nd Division; 13th Infantry Brigade
- Conflicts: Mahdist War; Suakin Expedition; Nile Expedition; Second Boer War; First World War
- Awards: Knight Commander of the Order of the Bath

Lieutenant-general Sir Henry Merrick Lawson, KCB (30 January 1859 – 2 November 1933) was a British Army general during the First World War.

== Military career ==
Educated at Cheltenham College and the Royal Military Academy Woolwich, Lawson was commissioned into the Royal Engineers of the British Army in December 1877.

He took part in the Suakin Expedition and Nile Expedition in 1884 and served in the Egyptian Army during the Mahdist War in 1898.

He served in the Second Boer War between 1899 and 1902, and following the end of the war in June 1902 stayed on as deputy-adjutant and quartermaster-general to the Forces in South Africa. He became director of movements and quarterings at the War Office in 1904, was appointed commander of the 13th Infantry Brigade in Dublin in 1906 and major-general in charge of administration for Aldershot Command in October 1907.

Sir Henry Lawson

Lawson became general officer commanding 2nd Division in February 1910 and Lieutenant Governor of Guernsey and Alderney in 1914.

He went on to be deputy chief of the Imperial General Staff in November 1914, general officer commanding-in-chief for Northern Command in succession to Lieutenant General Sir Herbert Plumer in January 1915 and then went into "Special Service" at the front in 1916. He was critical that too many men were doing "soft jobs" in the war and thereby encouraged the formation of the Women's Auxiliary Army Corps. Finally he was inspector general of communications for the Italian Expeditionary Force from 1917 to 1918; he retired from the army in 1921. He had been awarded the CB in January 1918.

== Political career ==
Lawson was twice a Parliamentary candidate for the Liberal Party. At the 1922 general election he stood in the constituency of Portsmouth South in a straight fight losing against sitting Conservative MP Herbert Cayzer. Soon after, Cayzer resigned through ill-health and when the new Tory MP Leslie Orme Wilson also resigned on his appointment as Governor of Bombay, Lawson was pressed back into service by the local Liberal Association. His opponent in the by-election, which took place on 13 August 1923, was none other than Herbert Cayzer, health clearly recovered. Lawson's campaign, while not returning him to parliament, reduced the Conservative majority from 5,867 to 2,121.

== Family ==
In 1912 Lawson married Lady Wilma, daughter of the 5th Earl of Radnor, and widow of 2nd Earl of Lathom.

Military offices
Preceded by Theodore Stephenson	GOC 2nd Division; 1910–1914	Succeeded by Archibald Murray
Government offices
Preceded by Sir Edward Hamilton	Lieutenant Governor of Guernsey; 1914	Succeeded by Sir Reginald Hart
Military offices
New post	Deputy Chief of the Imperial General Staff; 1914–1915	Succeeded by Sir Archibald Murray
Preceded by Sir Herbert Plumer	GOC-in-C Northern Command; 1915–1916	Succeeded by Sir John Maxwell
