= James Lacey =

British politician and trade unionist (1881–1974)

James Philip Durnford Lacey OBE (26 January 1881 – 8 June 1974) was a British politician and trade unionist.

Born in the Southsea area of Portsmouth in Hampshire, Lacey completed an apprenticeship as a builder and carpenter, then in 1902 moved to find work in South Africa. By this time, he was an active socialist and on his return to Portsmouth a few years later, he joined the Independent Labour Party (ILP), the local Labour Representation Committee, and the Amalgamated Society of Woodworkers. He was a supporter of British involvement in World War I and volunteered for the British Army, but was ordered to continue his work in the pattern shop at the naval dockyard. At the 1918 general election, he stood for the Labour Party in Portsmouth South, but took third place and was not elected.

In 1919, Lacey was elected to Portsmouth City Council, serving until 1922, and again from 1934 until 1970. During World War II, he chaired the War Emergency Committee, and he later chaired the Health Service Committee. He led the Labour group on the council from 1946 until 1963, although the ruling Conservative Party refused to elect him as Lord Mayor. In 1946, he was made an Officer of the Order of the British Empire.
