= Anthony Simpson =

British politician (1935–2022)

Anthony Simpson MEP
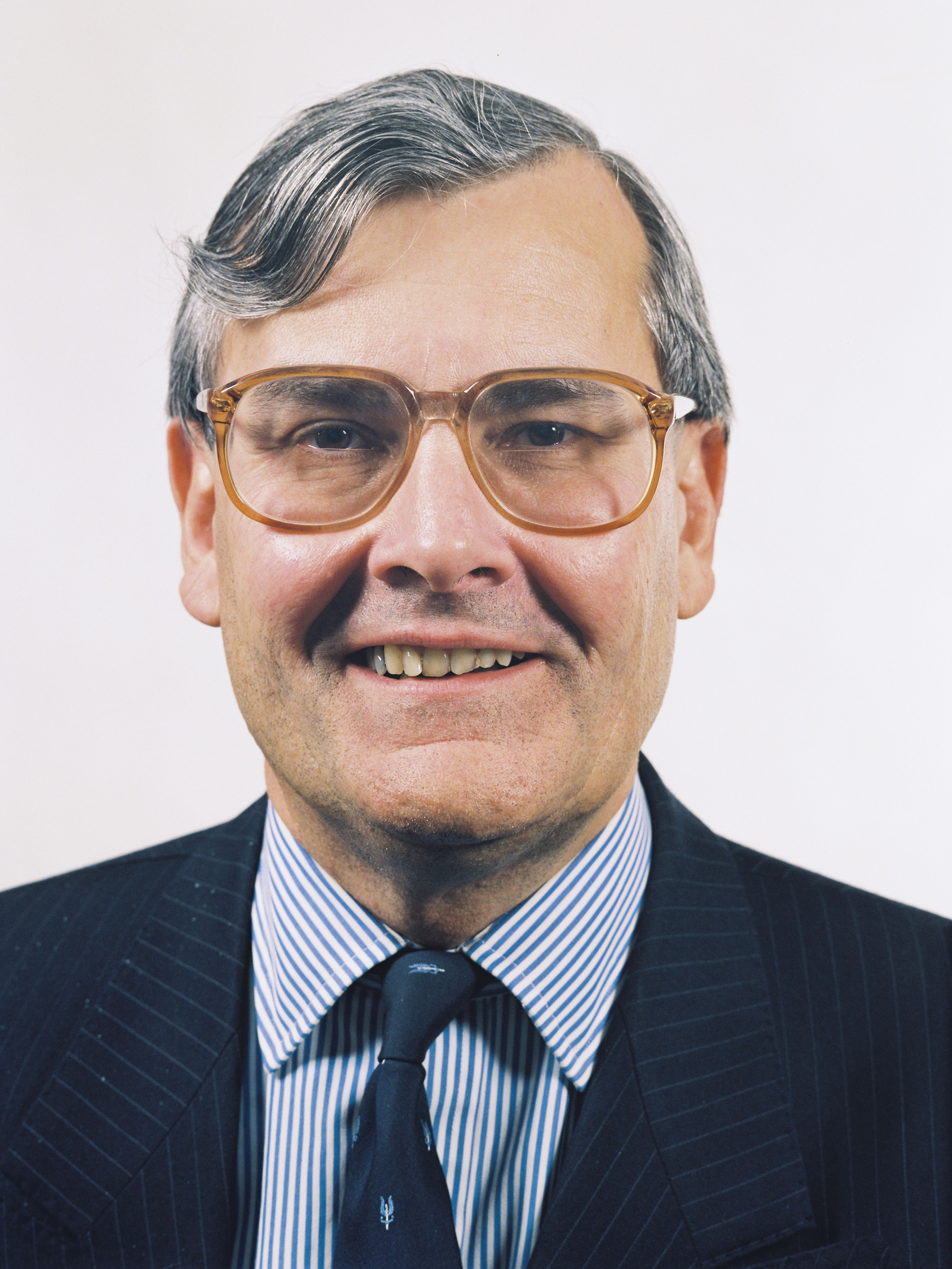
- European Parliament portrait

Member of the European Parliament for Northamptonshire
- In office 1979–1994

Personal details
- Born: 28 October 1935 Leicester, England
- Died: 14 August 2022 (aged 86) London, England
- Party: Conservative

Anthony Maurice Herbert Simpson (28 October 1935 – 14 August 2022) was a British politician who served as a Member of the European Parliament (MEP). He sat as a Conservative for the constituency of Northamptonshire from 1979 until 1994.

Simpson was educated at Rugby School and Magdalene College, Cambridge, graduating BA and LLB. He was called to the Bar at the Inner Temple in 1961, practising on the Midland and Oxford Circuit until 1975. He was also a member of the Territorial Army, rising to the rank of Major in 1968. In 1974 he stood as the Conservative candidate in Leicester West at both of that year's elections, losing to Labour's Greville Janner. Five years later, he was elected MEP for Northamptonshire, remaining in situ until 1994, when he lost the successor seat of Northamptonshire and Blaby at that year's European Parliamentary election to the Labour candidate, Angela Billingham. Thereafter he worked for the European Commission until his retirement in 2000, only intervening in British politics when adding his name to a letter in The Times (along with several other Conservative former parliamentarians) supporting the cause of the Pro-Euro Conservative Party at the 1999 European Parliamentary election. Simpson died on 14 August 2022, at the age of 86.
