= Northamptonshire (European Parliament constituency) =

Former European Parliament constituency

- European Parliament constituency
- Boundary within South East England (1979-1984)
- Member state: United Kingdom
- Created: 1979
- Dissolved: 1994
- MEPs: 1

Northamptonshire was a constituency of the European Parliament in the United Kingdom, established in 1979 as a single-member constituency and dissolved in 1994. Prior to the uniform adoption of proportional representation in 1999, the United Kingdom used first-past-the-post for the European elections in England, Scotland and Wales. The European Parliament constituencies used under that system were smaller than the later regional constituencies and only had one Member of the European Parliament each.

From 1979 to 1984, it consisted of the Westminster Parliament constituencies of Aylesbury, Buckingham, Daventry, Harborough, Kettering, Northampton North, Northampton South.

From 1984 to 1994, it consisted of the Westminster Parliament constituencies of Blaby, Corby, Daventry, Harborough, Kettering, Northampton North, Northampton South, Wellingborough.

Boundary within the East of England (1984-1994)

== MEPs ==
Elected	Member	Party
1979	Anthony Simpson	Conservative
1994	Constituency abolished	

== Results ==
European Parliament election, 1979: Northamptonshire
Party	Candidate	Votes	%	±%
Conservative	Anthony M. H. Simpson	103,638	59.6	
Labour	Alex Gordon	47,029	27.1	
Liberal	S. B. Crooks	23,134	13.3	
Majority		56,609	32.5	
Turnout		173,801		
Conservative win (new seat)				

European Parliament election, 1984: Northamptonshire
Party	Candidate	Votes	%	±%
Conservative	Anthony M. H. Simpson	88,668	49.7	−9.9
Labour	John Dickie	48,809	27.4	+0.3
SDP	Mrs Celia M. Goodhart	37,421	21.0	+7.7
Independent Ecology	Aubrey T. Bryant	3,330	1.9	New
Majority		39,859	22.3	−10.2
Turnout		178,228		
Conservative hold		Swing	-9.9	

European Parliament election, 1989: Northamptonshire
Party	Candidate	Votes	%	±%
Conservative	Anthony M. H. Simpson	86,695	41.8	−7.9
Labour	Michael A. Coyne	66,248	31.9	+4.5
Green	Audrey T. Bryant	43,071	20.7	+18.8
SLD	Richard W. Church	11,619	5.6	−15.4
Majority		20,447	9.9	−12.4
Turnout		207,633		
Conservative hold		Swing	-7.9	
