= Archibald Murray =

19/20th-century British Army officer

General Sir Archibald Murray GCB GCMG CVO DSO
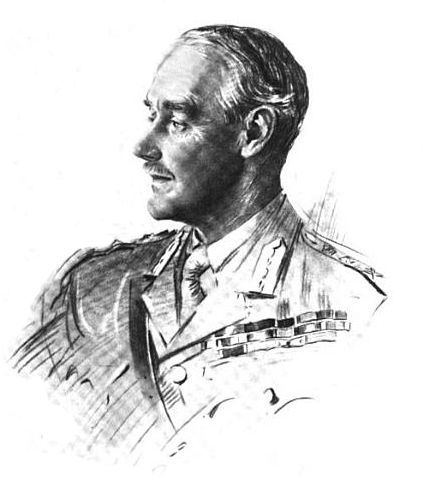
- Born: 23 April 1860; Sutton, Surrey, England
- Died: 21 January 1945 (aged 84); Reigate, Surrey, England
- Military career
- Allegiance: United Kingdom
- Branch: British Army
- Service years: 1879–1922
- Rank: General
- Nickname: "Old Archie" (Note: Generals' nicknames are worthy of consideration. "Old Archie" might imply 'good old Archie', a decent and reliable chap. These were character traits much valued in the old Victorian and Edwardian army. But it might also mean 'bit of an old woman Archie', a nitpicker, fusser and worrier. Haig, for one, was prone to dismissing Murray as an "old woman". Murray's manner throughout his career was thoughtful and reserved and he appeared to his contemporaries to be old beyond his years, which in Murray's case does not seem to have been a compliment, 'prematurely aged' rather than 'wise'.)
- Unit: Royal Inniskilling Fusiliers
- Commands: Aldershot Command; Egyptian Expeditionary Force; Chief of the Imperial General Staff; 2nd Division; 2nd Battalion, Royal Inniskilling Fusiliers
- Conflicts: Second Boer War; First World War
- Awards: Knight Grand Cross of the Order of the Bath; Knight Grand Cross of the Order of St Michael and St George; Commander of the Royal Victorian Order; Companion of the Distinguished Service Order; Mentioned in Despatches

General Sir Archibald James Murray, GCB, GCMG, CVO, DSO (23 April 1860 – 21 January 1945) was a British Army officer who served in the Second Boer War and the First World War. He was chief of the general staff to the British Expeditionary Force (BEF) in August 1914 but appears to have suffered a physical breakdown in the retreat from Mons, and was required to step down from that position in January 1915. After serving as deputy chief of the Imperial General Staff for much of 1915, he was briefly chief of the Imperial General Staff from September to December 1915. He was subsequently commander-in-chief of the Egyptian Expeditionary Force from January 1916 to June 1917, in which role he laid the military foundation for the defeat and destruction of the Ottoman Empire in the Arabian Peninsula and the Levant.

== Military career ==
Archibald James Murray was "the fourth child and second son of nine children" of Charles Murray and his wife Anne Graves. He was educated at Cheltenham College and it was from here, in 1877, that he went to the Royal Military College, Sandhurst, intent on starting a military career, despite there being "no evidence of a family military connection or any indication of how free Murray was to choose his own career". He was commissioned as a second lieutenant into the 27th Regiment of Foot, later the Royal Inniskilling Fusiliers, "an unfashionable regiment", on 13 August 1879.

He was appointed adjutant of his regiment on 12 February 1886. After promotion to captain on 1 July 1887 and taking part in the suppression of a Zulu uprising in 1888, he became adjutant of the 4th Battalion, the Bedfordshire Regiment on 15 December 1890.

Murray attended the Staff College, Camberley from 1897 to 1898 and was promoted while there to major on 1 June 1898. While at the college he encountered several men with whom he would later encounter in the years leading up to the First World War, most notably Douglas Haig and Edmund Allenby, who attended from the years 1896 to 1897, and William Robertson. It was also here where Murray gained his nickname of "Old Archie".

He served in the Second Boer War as deputy assistant adjutant general for intelligence in Natal from 9 October 1899 and then as chief of staff to the commander there. He took part in the withdrawal from Dundee and then the siege of Ladysmith in late 1899 and became senior staff officer to Sir Archibald Hunter, general officer commanding of the 10th Division, early in 1900. He was appointed an assistant adjutant general on 6 March 1900, promoted to lieutenant-colonel on 29 October 1900 and appointed a Companion of the Distinguished Service Order on 29 November 1900. He was again mentioned in despatches in February 1901.

Murray was appointed commanding officer of the 2nd Battalion, Royal Inniskilling Fusiliers, stationed in India, in October 1901, but never took up this position. He was deployed to Northern Transvaal in February 1902 where he was seriously wounded in April and mentioned in despatches once more in July.

After the end of hostilities in South Africa, he returned to England in June 1902, and became assistant adjutant general at Headquarters 1st Division at Aldershot on 3 November 1902. Promoted to colonel on 29 October 1903, he was appointed a Companion of the Order of the Bath in the 1904 Birthday Honours and, promoted in November 1905 to the temporary rank of brigadier general, upon being made BGGS of Aldershot Command, became a Commander of the Royal Victorian Order on 12 June 1907.

Murray became director of military training, "a key posting in an army that was undergoing substantive reform", at the War Office, in succession to Major-General Douglas Haig, on 9 November 1907 and, having been promoted to major-general on 13 July 1910, he was advanced to Knight Commander of the Order of the Bath in the June 1911 Coronation Honours. He also took part in the procession for the coronation of King George V on 22 June 1911. Murray became inspector of infantry on 9 December 1912. At the General Staff Conference in January 1914 he rejected proposals to adopt what he saw as a stereotyped French fire-and-movement doctrine. He then served as General officer commanding (GOC) of the 2nd Division from 1 February 1914, taking over this post from Major-General Henry Merrick Lawson.

== Chief of Staff, British Expeditionary Force, France and Belgium ==
=== Appointment ===
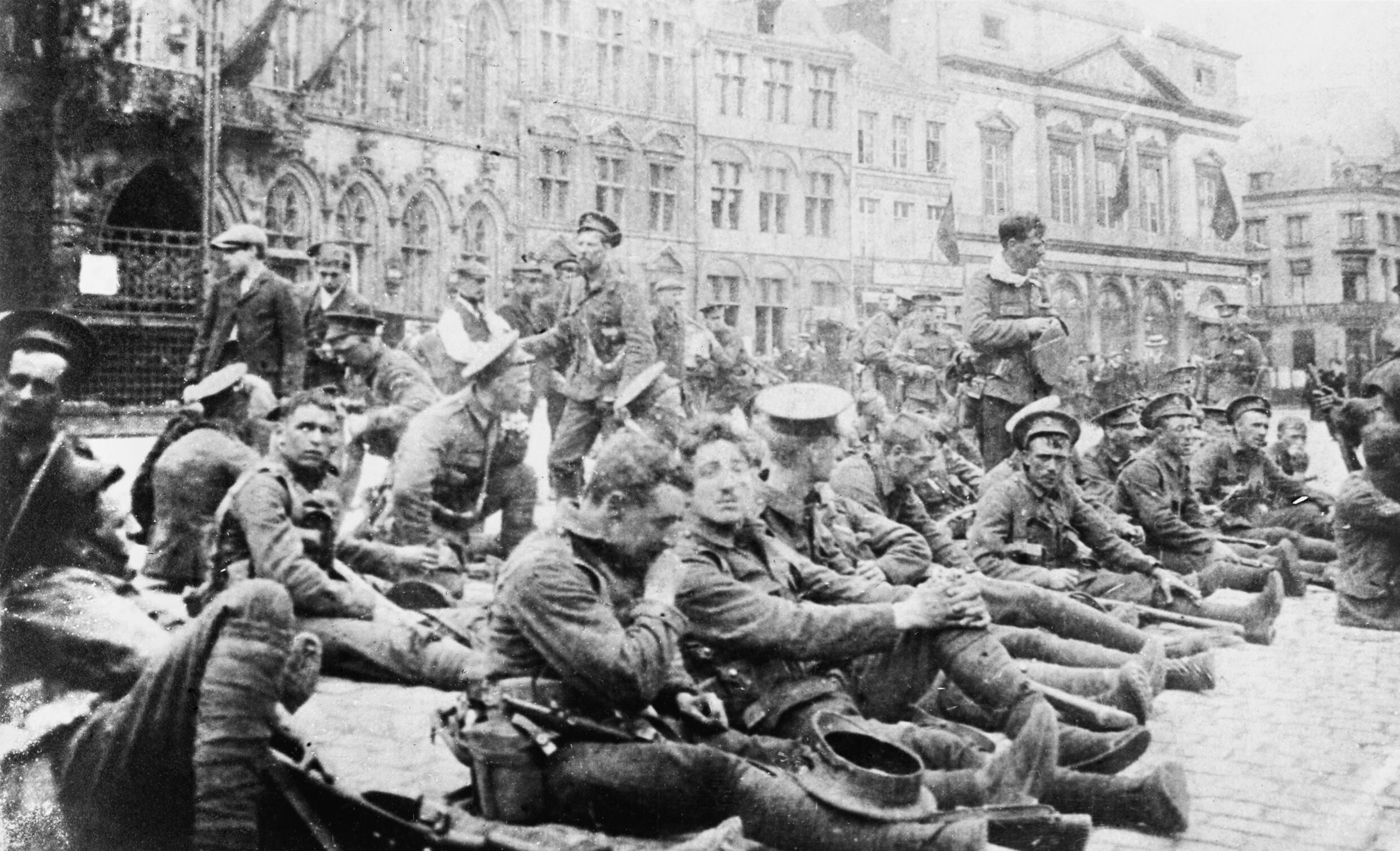
Men of the 4th Battalion, Royal Fusiliers, 3rd Division, preparing for the Battle of Mons, August 1914.

When the First World War started in July 1914 Murray was not appointed quartermaster general of the British Expeditionary Force (BEF) as was originally intended. Instead he became chief of staff. He was promoted to temporary lieutenant-general on 5 August. Murray had already earned a high reputation as a staff officer in South Africa and under Sir John French, the BEF's commander, at the War Office. It is sometimes claimed that Murray was given the position largely because French's initial choice for the post, Henry Hughes Wilson, was vetoed because of his role in the Curragh incident. Although this claim was made after the war by James Edward Edmonds, Walter Kirke (in his memoir of George Macdonogh) and Murray, there is no contemporary evidence, even in Wilson's diary, to confirm it (unlike January 1915, when Wilson was certainly blocked from succeeding Murray for political reasons). J. M. Bourne, however, offers another explanation:

French offers no explanation in his memoirs for Murray's appointment. A CGS was urgently needed. Murray was to hand. He had the necessary seniority. He was staff trained. He had known Sir John French for ten years, working quite closely with him when French was GOC Aldershot and then CIGS. Unlike Wilson, Murray brought with him no political baggage and no professional enemies. His was a sensible, sound and safe appointment. Murray was, in short, unobjectionable.

Wilson, Sir John French (British Expeditionary Force (BEF) Commander-in-Chief) and Murray crossed to France on 14 August. The code books had been left behind in London, and Lieutenant Edward Spears had to go back to London for another set. He returned to find Murray at Rheims trying to "unravel" the strategic situation of the German Empire's armies' invasion of France on a set of large maps spread out upon the floor of his hotel room, on all fours, dressed only in his "pants" (underwear), whilst chambermaids came and went.

=== Retreat from Mons ===
During the retreat of August 1914 the BEF staff, who had not rehearsed their roles, performed poorly. French was a dynamic leader but no manager. William Robertson and Walter Kirke recorded that Murray knew little of the plans which Wilson had drawn up with the French and had to work with a staff "almost entirely staffed from the (Military Operations) Directorate" who were used to working with Wilson. This staff included Colonel George Harper.

Murray summoned the Corps Chiefs of Staff at around 1am on 24 August (the night after the Battle of Mons), and ordered them to retreat, but gave them no detailed plans, leaving them to work out the details themselves. French agreed to Douglas Haig's request that I Corps retreat east of the Forest of Mormal (Haig Diary, 24 August) without, apparently, Horace Smith-Dorrien (GOC II Corps) being asked or informed. (Inept staffwork was not unique to GHQ – neither I nor II Corps staff had checked whether or not the Forest of Mormal was occupied by the enemy.) On 24 August Harper refused to do anything for Murray, so that Lord Loch had to write messages even though it was not his job. Loch wrote in his diary for that day that Murray was "by nature petulant" and "difficult to work with". Murray and his staff were working flat out in intense heat at Bavay, and recorded (24 August) that he had passed 24 hours without undressing or sleeping. Smith-Dorrien visited GHQ to request detailed orders on the evening of 24 August, and had to bully Murray into issuing orders for II Corps to retreat to Le Cateau.

Murray noted in his diary (25 August) that GHQ had moved back from Le Cateau to St Quentin and that I Corps was being heavily engaged by night – making no mention of what II Corps were up to. When 4th Division arrived (25 August) Thomas Snow's orders were to help prepare a defensive position on the Cambrai-Le Cateau position, as GHQ had no idea of the seriousness of the situation facing II Corps. 4th Division was eventually able to participate in the Battle of Le Cateau. The news that Smith-Dorrien planned to stand and fight at Le Cateau reached GHQ at 5 am on 26 August – French was woken from his sleep, and insisting that Murray not be woken, sent Smith-Dorrien an ambiguous message that he had "a free hand as to the method" by which he fell back, which Smith-Dorrien took as permission to fight.

Murray appears to have suffered some kind of physical collapse round about this time, although the details differ between different eyewitness accounts. Wilson recorded that Murray had "completely broken down", had been given "morphia or some other drug" which made him incapable of work and when told (7 am on 26 August) of Smith-Dorrien's decision to stand and fight "promptly got a fainting fit". Spears' recollection (in 1930) was that Murray had collapsed with a weak pulse, but did not actually faint, when told earlier during the same night (the news later turned out to be exaggerated) that the Germans had fallen upon Haig's I Corps at Landrecies. Spears wrote that Murray was too ill to attend the meeting of Sir John French with Joseph Joffre and Charles Lanrezac on 26 August, although John Terraine has him attending this meeting. Nevil Macready later recorded that Murray fainted at his desk whilst working at Noyon (where GHQ was based on 27 August).

Wilson returned to GHQ on 29 August from a visit to Joffre to find – he said – "a perfect debacle" with "Murray leading the fright".

=== Autumn 1914 ===
On 4 September Murray had an important meeting with Joseph Gallieni (military governor of Paris) and Michel Maunoury (commander, French Sixth Army) to discuss the planned Allied counterattack which would become the First Battle of the Marne. Murray had no idea when French, who was out visiting British I Corps, was to return and was unwilling to make any decision in his absence. After a three-hour meeting a provisional agreement was drawn up; the French came away with the impression that the British would not cooperate and that Murray had "une grande repugnance" for them, but he did in fact pass the plans along to French. Whilst this was going on, Wilson was negotiating separate plans with Louis Franchet d'Esperey (French Fifth Army, on the British right).

Wilson noted (diary 6 Sep – the day on which the BEF began to advance as part of the Battle of the Marne) that French and Murray "were out motoring and playing the ass all day". He had to intercede to prevent French from sacking Harper (Wilson diary 7 Sep) but a week later recorded (Wilson diary 14 Sep), that Murray and Harper argued constantly. After a month Murray was still talking of "my men" and "(Wilson')s men" which Wilson thought "rather sad" and "deplorable" (Sidney Clive diary 18 Sep). Wilson thought French and Murray were "between them quite unable to size up a position or to act with constancy for 24 hours" (Wilson diary 28 Sep)

Murray complained to Victor Huguet (a French liaison officer serving with the British) about Wilson (6 October), but also told Wilson that French was getting "more unreasonable" and asked Wilson whether he (Murray) should resign; Wilson informed William Lambton, French's secretary, of both of these incidents. Murray also (4–5 November) complained and threatened to resign when Wilson amended one of his orders without telling him. Murray later wrote (in 1930) "Why did I stay with (this) War Office clique when I knew I was not wanted? I wanted to see Sir John through. I had been so many years with him, and knew better than anyone how his health, temper and temperament rendered him unfit, in my opinion, for the crisis we had to face. ... the senior members (of GHQ staff) entirely ignored me, as far as possible, continually thwarted me, even altered my instructions." He also said that Wilson's disloyalty had left him the impossible job of managing French alone. Henry Rawlinson noted in his diary that Murray became "a cipher at GHQ" (28 November 1914), was disliked by his subordinates (4 December) and that French often ignored his staff "chiefly because Murray is incapable of managing them and getting any good work out of them" (6 December 1914). James Edward Edmonds later said that Murray sometimes falsified the timing of orders, but he was given away by the time stamp which the duty clerk placed on them.

=== Removal ===
At the end of November and again in mid-December French told Wilson he was thinking of moving Murray to a corps command. Asquith and Kitchener (20 December) forbade French to replace Murray with Wilson. Wilson claimed to have heard Joffre, on a visit to GHQ (27 December), complain that it was "a pity" that Murray had not been removed.

Murray was sent off sick for a month (24 January 1915) and French demanded his resignation (25 January 1915), despite Murray insisting that he only needed to take a few days off. Wilson was widely suspected of having plotted for Murray's removal in the vain hope of replacing him, but the job went to Robertson. Although a sore throat prevented him seeing Murray off, French wrote to him (29 January) saying he hoped to see him back as an army commander before long. Haig wrote (diary 26 January) that "Murray was a kindly fellow but not a practical man in the field".

A staff officer, Brigadier General Philip Howell, wrote to his wife (27 February 1915) that Murray had been "incompetent, cantankerous, timid & quite useless". The Official Historian Edmonds later described him as "a complete nonentity". Richard Holmes described him as "an intelligent, cultivated man" who had not yet recovered from a stomach wound in South Africa.

== Chief of the Imperial General Staff ==
He was made Deputy Chief of the Imperial General Staff on 10 February 1915 and was appointed a Knight Commander of the Order of St Michael and St George on 18 February 1915. As deputy CIGS Murray's responsibility was training and organising the New Armies, a job requiring much travel.

Murray became Chief of the Imperial General Staff (CIGS) on 26 September 1915. He was promoted to substantive lieutenant general on 28 October 1915. After the war he wrote to General Sir Ian Hamilton, criticising Kitchener in harsh terms, writing that "He seldom told the absolute the truth and the whole truth" and that it was not until Kitchener left for his inspection of the Dardanelles that Murray was able to inform the Cabinet that volunteering had fallen far below the level needed to maintain a BEF of 70 divisions, requiring the introduction of conscription. The Cabinet insisted on proper General Staff papers being presented in Kitchener's absence. Murray wrote that "I have never in my forty years' service done better work than I did during the three months I was CIGS". Cabinet Secretary Maurice Hankey praised Murray highly as a real "St John the Baptist" to Sir William Robertson, his successor as CIGS.

However H. H. Asquith, the prime minister, sought changes in senior military positions. Haig, about to be appointed Commander-in-Chief of the BEF (3 December 1915), rejected Kitchener's suggestion that Murray be reappointed as Chief of Staff BEF (the job which Robertson was vacating to become CIGS). In his final days in office Murray issued a paper urging concentration of effort on the Western Front (16 December 1915) which was described by Robertson as the "Bible of the war". Murray was forced out as CIGS on 23 December 1915 and replaced by Robertson, a strong advocate of the single (Western) front strategy.

Murray's advice had been met with dismay from some Liberal members of the coalition Cabinet, who were unhappy at the realignment of Britain's war effort towards total war and a massive commitment of troops to the Western Front. Augustine Birrell (Chief Secretary for Ireland), along with Reginald McKenna (Chancellor of the Exchequer), Walter Runciman (President of the Board of Trade) and Sir Edward Grey (Foreign Secretary) had contemplated joining Sir John Simon (Home Secretary) in resigning in protest at the conscription of bachelors, due to be enacted in January 1916. Birrell wrote to the Prime Minister (29 December) that he and Runciman agreed that finance and "strategic policy as expounded in Murray's long, unconvincing and frightening paper" were more important than conscription.

== Egyptian Command ==
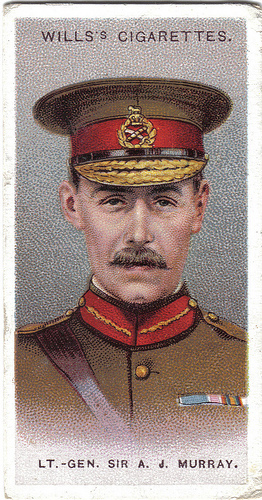
Lt.-Gen. Sir A. J. Murray WWI Cigarette Card issued by W.D. & H.O. Wills Bristol & London

=== 1916 ===
In January 1916, Murray was given command of the British Troops in Egypt and the Egyptian Expeditionary Force. Egypt was a base for the Salonika and Gallipoli Fronts. In January 1916 Murray was relieved of operational command of (though not logistical responsibility for) British troops at Salonika, which was given to the French General Maurice Sarrail. Initially General John Maxwell still had command of Western Egypt (facing the Senussi Revolt) until he was sent to Ireland to suppress the Easter Rising.

Murray wrote to Robertson (18 March 1916) that the Australians were "from a physical point of view a magnificent body of men" but had "no idea of ordinary decency or self control".

Britain had 300,000 men in Egypt, many of them ANZACs or Gallipoli evacuees, supposedly to guard against a Turkish attack across the Sinai, which Robertson thought logistically unlikely. By July 1916, on Robertson's orders, Murray had shipped out 240,000 of them, including 9 infantry divisions, three independent infantry brigades and 9 heavy artillery batteries, most of them going to France, leaving him with four Territorial divisions and some mounted troops. 11,000 Indian troops were shipped out, and another division to Mesopotamia and an eleventh to France early in 1917, leaving him with three under-strength infantry divisions and the elements of two more, and two cavalry divisions.

Trying to prevent another Turkish attack against the Suez Canal, Murray reorganized his troops and led a counterattack, winning a victory at Romani in August 1916. He now had to advance over the Sinai Peninsula, which consisted of sand in the north, gravel and clay in the centre and mountains in the south. 400 miles of railway, 300 miles of metalled and wire-meshed roads and 300 miles of pipes had to be laid. Drinking water had to be pumped underneath the Suez Canal from the Sweet Water Canal in the Nile Delta, requiring the construction of filtration plants, reservoirs and pumping stations. The line on the frontier was 45 miles in width, half the width of the 80–90-mile front on the Canal. Murray captured El Arish in December and Rafa on the Palestine frontier in January 1917.

=== 1917 ===
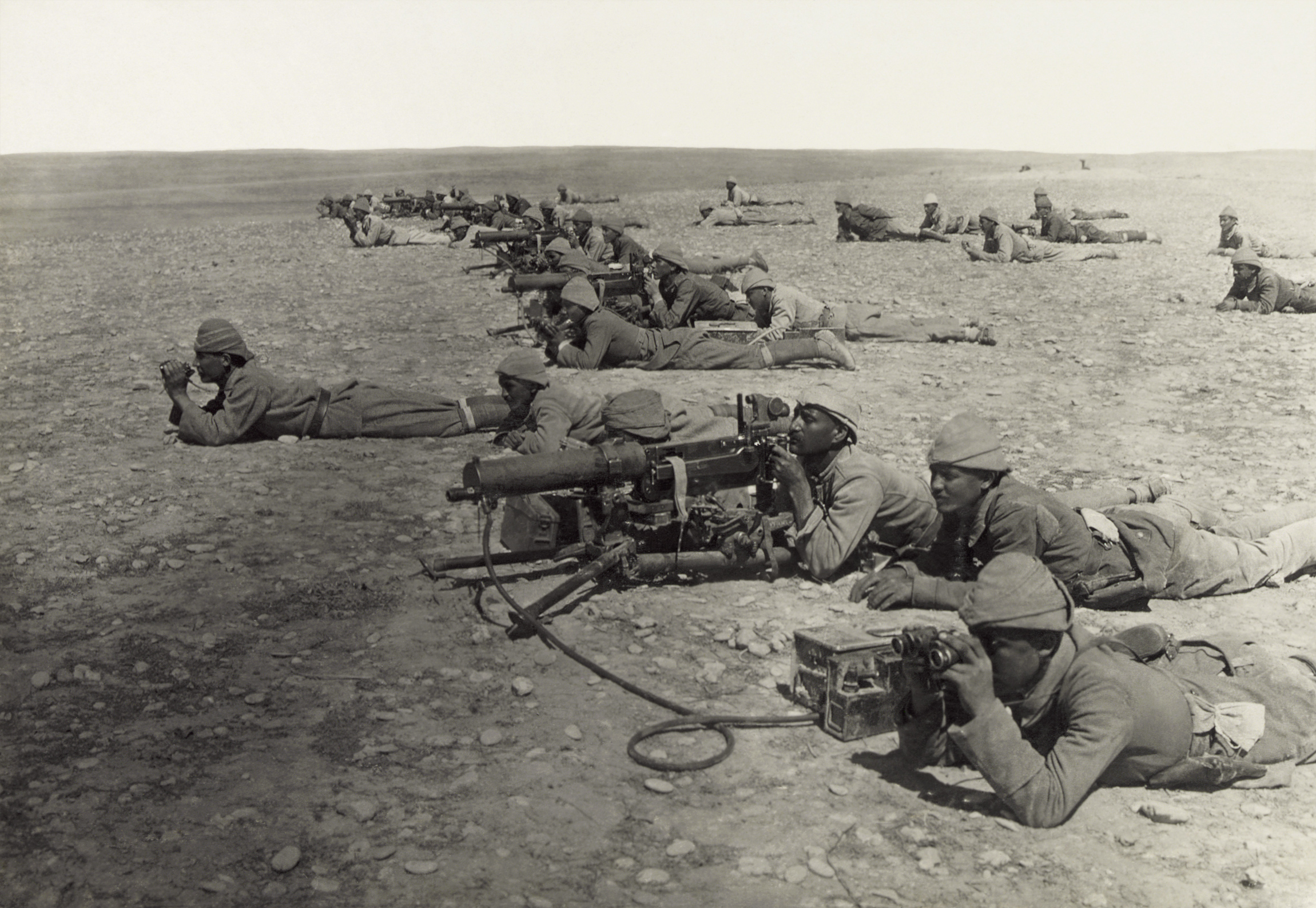
Ottoman Machine Gun Corps in position during the Second Battle of Gaza: Murray withdrew his troops

Lloyd George wanted to make the destruction of Turkey a major British war aim, and two days after becoming Prime Minister told Robertson that he wanted a major victory, preferably the capture of Jerusalem, to impress British public opinion. Robertson thought the capture of Beersheba should suffice as more divisions were needed in France. However, Robertson was not entirely hostile to efforts in Palestine, telling Murray (31 January 1917) he wanted him to launch a Palestine Offensive in autumn and winter 1917, if the war was still going on then. The object was to sustain public morale and, with a compromise peace leaving Germany in control of the Balkans increasingly possible, to capture Aleppo. Aleppo was more easily reached from Palestine than from Mesopotamia, and her capture would make untenable Turkey's hold on both regions. At this stage Russia was still pinning down many Turkish troops, although the Admiralty were not enthused about suggestions that the Royal Navy make amphibious landings in Palestine. It was agreed to build up Murray's forces to 6 infantry divisions and 2 mounted divisions by the autumn, as well as 16 Imperial Camel Companies and possibly some Indian cavalry from France.

Murray was advanced to Knight Grand Cross of the Order of St Michael and St George on 20 January 1917.

It was Murray who authorized T. E. Lawrence's expedition to join the Arab Revolt against the Turks in Arabia, providing monetary and limited military support for Lawrence's attack on Aqaba: initially skeptical of the Revolt's potential, Murray became an ardent supporter of it later in his tenure in Cairo, largely through Lawrence's persuasion. By early 1917 the Turks had also withdrawn from Persia and had pulled back from Medina, which was besieged by the Arabs.

Murray completed the defeat of the Senussi (taking Siwa in February 1917).

In March 1917 at the First Battle of Gaza a British force under Murray's command comprising 52nd (Lowland) Division reinforced by an infantry brigade from Eastern Force attacked Gaza. While the Imperial Mounted Division held off the Turkish reinforcements, the Australian and New Zealand Mounted Division (Anzac Mounted Division) reinforced the infantry attack and together, they succeeded in entering Gaza from the north and capturing the adjoining hill of Ali Muntar. However the determination of the Turkish defenders and the threat from large Turkish reinforcements approaching from the north and north east ultimately led to decision to withdraw. The First Battle of Gaza had been described as "most successful" by understating British and exaggerating enemy casualties. This led to loss of political confidence in Murray.

At the Second Battle of Gaza in April 1917 Murray assembled a larger force comprising the 52nd (Lowland) Division, 53rd (Welsh) Division, the 54th (East Anglian) Division and the recently formed 74th (Yeomanry) Division which was made up of brigades of dismounted yeomanry serving as infantry. However the six British tanks, the British heavy guns and naval gunfire from the French coastal defence ship Requin and two British monitors (M21 and M31) did little damage and only served to warn the Turks of the imminent British attack which faltered at all points. Again Murray decided to withdraw. The Second Battle of Gaza failed due to lack of artillery.

The Second Battle of Gaza coincided with the failure of the Nivelle Offensive, reports of unrest among Russian troops after the February Revolution and an escalation of the U-Boat War (it was thought that loss of shipping might make Egypt untenable) causing Robertson to prefer a return to a defensive policy in the Middle East, although this was not Lloyd George's view.

Despite laying the plans for the ultimate defeat of the Turks, Murray was relieved of command and replaced by Edmund Allenby on 29 June 1917. Murray was mentioned in despatches again on 3 November 1917.

== After Egypt and final years ==
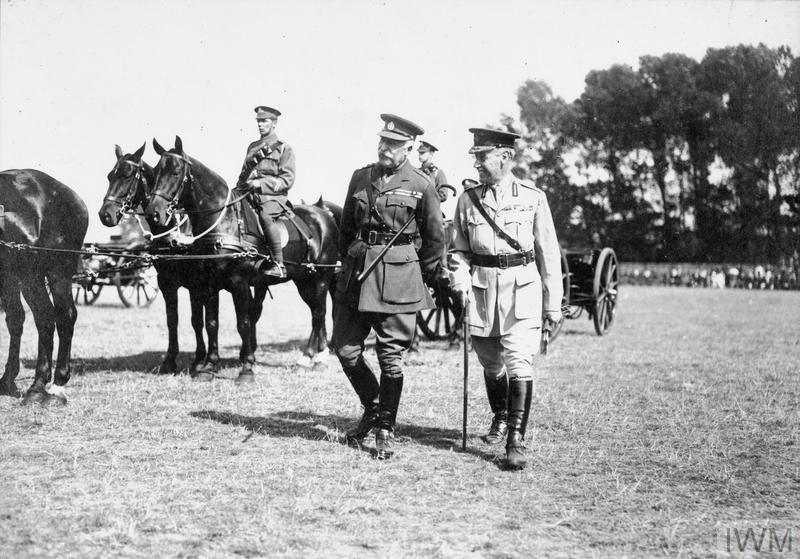
General Sir Archibald Murray (right) walking with the Duke of Connaught. Believed to have been photographed in Aldershot, presumably when Murray was GOC-in-C Aldershot.

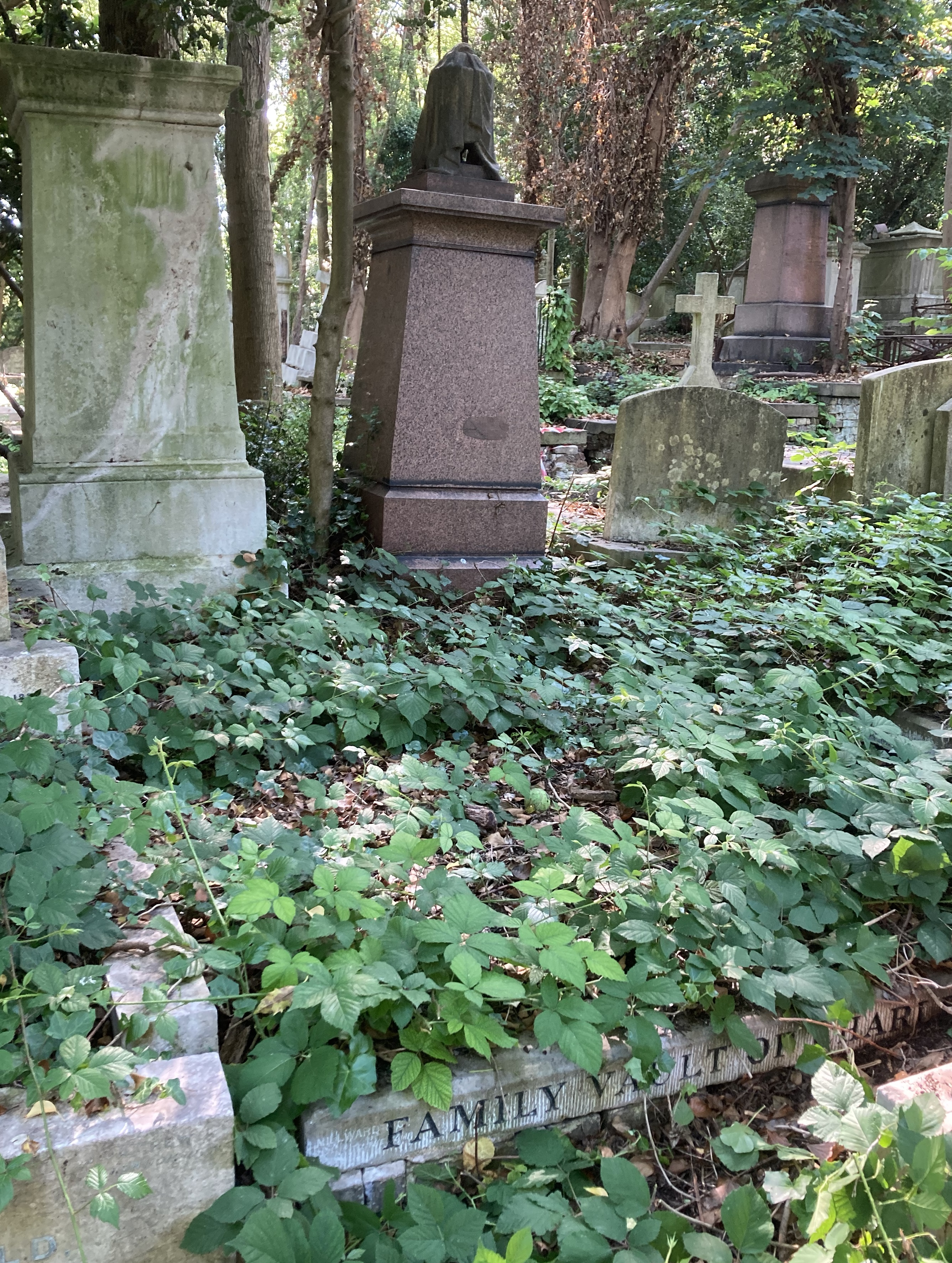
Family vault of General Sir Archibald Murray in Highgate Cemetery.

Murray was reassigned, becoming General Officer Commanding-in-Chief for Aldershot Command in October 1917, in succession to General Sir Archibald Hunter, and having been promoted to full general, "for distinguished service in connection with military operations in the Field", on 25 August 1919, remained in post until 15 November 1919.

After retiring from the British Army on 15 November 1922, he was advanced to Knight Grand Cross of the Order of the Bath in the 1928 New Year Honours.

He was also colonel of the Royal Inniskilling Fusiliers from 22 August 1911.

Murray died at his home "Makepeace" at Reigate in Surrey on 21 January 1945 and was buried in a family vault on the west side of Highgate Cemetery.

== Family ==
In 1890 he married Caroline Helen Sweet; they had one son. Following the death of his first wife he married Mildred Georgina Dooner in 1912.

== Cultural references ==
Murray was unsympathetically portrayed by Donald Wolfit in the cinema film Lawrence of Arabia as a stereotypical blimpish British general, obsessed with artillery. Mount Murray in the Canadian Rockies was named in his honor in 1918.

== Bibliography ==
- Beckett, Dr Ian F; Corvi, Steven J (2006). Haig's Generals. London: Pen & Sword. ISBN 9781844158928.
- Victor Bonham-Carter (1963). Soldier True:the Life and Times of Field-Marshal Sir William Robertson. London: Frederick Muller Limited.
- Cassar, George H. (2011). Lloyd George at War, 1916–18. Anthem Press, London. ISBN 978-0-857-28392-4.
- Edmonds, , J.; Bunton, M. (3 January 2008). "Sir Archibald Murray". Oxford Dictionary of National Biography (online ed.). Oxford University Press. doi:10.1093/ref:odnb/35155. (Subscription, Wikipedia Library access or UK public library membership required.)
- Falls, Cyril; MacMunn, George (1930). Military operations: Egypt and Palestine. London, Imperial War Museum. pp. 279–350. ISBN 978-1870423267.
- Guinn, Paul (1965). British Strategy and Politics 1914–18. Clarendon. ASIN B0000CML3C.
- Hastings, Max (2013). Catastrophe 1914: Europe Goes To War. New York: Alfred A. Knopf. ISBN 978-0-307-59705-2.
- Herwig, Holger (2009). The Marne. Random House. ISBN 978-0-8129-7829-2.
- Holmes, Richard (2004). The Little Field Marshal: A Life of Sir John French. Weidenfeld & Nicolson. ISBN 0-297-84614-0.
- Jeffery, Keith (2006). Field Marshal Sir Henry Wilson: A Political Soldier. Oxford University Press. ISBN 978-0-19-820358-2.
- Lawrence, Thomas Edward (1997). "Chapter XXXIV". Seven Pillars of Wisdom. Vol. Book III. Wordsworth Editions. ISBN 978-1-85326-469-6.
- Robbins, Simon (2005). British Generalship on the Western Front. Abingdon: Routledge. ISBN 0-415-40778-8.
- Senior, Ian (2012). Home Before the Leaves Fall: A New History of the German Invasion of 1914. Osprey. ISBN 978-1-848-84209-0.
- Sheffield, Gary; Bourne, John (2005). Douglas Haig Diaries and Letters 1914–18. London: Phoenix. ISBN 978-0297847021.
- Spears, Sir Edward (1930). Liaison 1914. Eyre & Spottiswood. ISBN 978-0304352289.
- Terraine, John (1960). Mons, The Retreat to Victory. Wordsworth Military Library, London. ISBN 1-84022-240-9.
- Travers, Tim (1987). The Killing Ground. Allen & Unwin. ISBN 0-85052-964-6.
- Woodward, David R (1998). Field Marshal Sir William Robertson. Westport Connecticut & London: Praeger. ISBN 0-275-95422-6.

Military offices
| Preceded by Henry Lawson | GOC 2nd Division; February–August 1914 | Succeeded by Charles Monro |
| Preceded by Sir Henry Lawson | Deputy Chief of the Imperial General Staff; February–September 1915 | Succeeded by Sir Launcelot Kiggell |
| Preceded by Sir James Murray | Chief of the Imperial General Staff; September–December 1915 | Succeeded by Sir William Robertson |
| Preceded by Sir Charles Monro | GOC British Troops in Egypt and the Egyptian Expeditionary Force; 1916–1917 | Succeeded by Sir Edmund Allenby |
| Preceded by Sir Archibald Hunter | GOC-in-C Aldershot Command; 1917–1919 | Succeeded by Lord Rawlinson |
Honorary titles
| Preceded by Sir Nathaniel Stevenson | Colonel of the Royal Inniskilling Fusiliers; 1911–1923 | Succeeded by Sir Travers Clarke |
