= Jocelyn Lucas =

British politician (1889–1980)

Major Sir Jocelyn Morton Lucas, 4th Baronet, KBE, MC (27 August 1889 – 2 May 1980) was a British Conservative Party politician. He was elected as the member of parliament for Portsmouth South in a by-election in 1939 and held the seat until he retired at the 1966 general election. Prior to his election, he had been the Portsmouth District Officer for Sir Oswald Mosley's British Union of Fascists.

The son of Sir Edward Lingard Lucas, 3rd Baronet, by his marriage to Mary Helen Chance, Lucas was educated at Eton and the Royal Military College, Sandhurst. He fought in the First World War, where he was wounded and became a prisoner of war. He gained the rank of Major in the service of the 4th Battalion, Royal Warwickshire Regiment. He was decorated with the award of the Military Cross.

Lucas married, firstly, Edith Cameron, daughter of Very Rev. David Barrie Cameron, on 20 December 1933. He married, secondly, Thelma Grace Arbuthnot, daughter of Harold Denison Arbuthnot and Anne Grace Lambert, on 20 October 1960.

He bred Sealyham Terriers. In the late 1940s, by crossing his Sealyhams with Norfolk Terriers he developed a breed of dog (which he described as "death to rats") and the Lucas Terrier was named after him.

== Publications ==
- Pedigree dog breeding. London: Simpkin, Marshall & Co. 1925.
- Simple doggy remedies. London: Simpkin, Marshall & Co. 1927.
- The new book of the Sealyham. London: Simpkin, Marshall & Co. 1929.
- Hunt and working terriers. London: Chapman & Hall. 1931.

Parliament of the United Kingdom
Preceded by Sir Herbert Cayzer	Member of Parliament for Portsmouth South; 1939 – 1966	Succeeded by Bonner Pink
Baronetage of the United Kingdom
Preceded by Edward Lingard Lucas	Baronet (of Ashtead Park); 1936–1980	Succeeded by Thomas Edward Lucas
