= David Martin (English politician) =

British politician

David John Pattison Martin (born 5 February 1945) is a British farmer, barrister, and Conservative politician.

== Early life ==
Martin is the son of John Besley Martin CBE and his wife Muriel. He was educated at Norwood School, Exeter, Kelly College, Tavistock, and Fitzwilliam College, Cambridge, where he graduated BA in 1967; he then trained as a barrister at the Inner Temple.

He became a partner in ADP&E Farmers in 1968 and also worked for Martins Caravans Company Ltd., founded by his father.

== Parliamentary career ==
Martin served as a Teignbridge District councillor from 1979 to 1983. He stood for Yeovil at the 1983 general election but was defeated.

He served as the Conservative Member of Parliament for Portsmouth South from 1987 until the 1997 general election, in 1990 serving as PPS to the Defence Minister Alan Clark and then from 1990 to 1994 as PPS to the Foreign Secretary Douglas Hurd. In 1997, he was unseated by the Liberal Democrat candidate Mike Hancock. He stood again at the 2001 general election in the seat of Rugby and Kenilworth and at the 2005 general election in the seat of Bristol West but was unsuccessful on both occasions.

== Family ==
Martin married Basia Dowmunt and they have one son and three daughters. One of their daughters is the novelist Cesca Major. Martin is also a paternal uncle of Coldplay's lead vocalist, Chris Martin.

Parliament of the United Kingdom
Preceded by Mike Hancock	Member of Parliament for Portsmouth South; 1987 – 1997	Succeeded by Mike Hancock
