= Mike Hancock (British politician) =

British politician (born 1946)

Mike Hancock CBE

Member of Parliament for Portsmouth South
- In office 1 May 1997 – 30 March 2015
- Preceded by: David Martin
- Succeeded by: Flick Drummond
- In office 14 June 1984 – 18 May 1987
- Preceded by: Bonner Pink
- Succeeded by: David Martin

Leader of Hampshire County Council
- In office 1993–1997

Portsmouth City Councillor for Fratton
- In office 12 April 1973 – 22 May 2014
- Preceded by: New Ward
- Succeeded by: Julie Swan (UKIP)
- Majority: 1,778 (31.6%)

Personal details
- Born: 9 July 1946 (age 80) Portsmouth, Hampshire, England
- Party: Independent
- Other political affiliations: Liberal Democrats (1988–2014); SDP (1981–88); Labour (1968–81)
- Spouse: Jacqueline Elliott (m. 1967)
- Children: 2
- Website: www.mikehancock.co.uk

Michael Thomas Hancock CBE (born 9 July 1946) is a British politician. He previously served as Member of Parliament (MP) for Portsmouth South from 1997 until 2015.

Hancock formally resigned from the Liberal Democrat whip in early June 2014 until a civil court action brought against him by a female constituent alleging improper conduct was resolved. An out-of-court settlement with the woman, known only as 'Annie', was reached later in June 2014 in which Hancock admitted that he "crossed the line" into inappropriate behaviour. Hancock's resignation was announced on 18 September 2014.

He stood as an independent candidate in the 2014 Portsmouth City Council elections and lost his seat in Fratton Ward to UKIP candidate Julie Swan. The Liberal Democrats lost overall control of the council. While still an MP, Hancock stood again as an independent candidate for Fratton Ward in the 2015 Portsmouth City Council elections this time coming sixth, with the Liberal Democrat candidate Dave Ashmore taking the seat.

Hancock was previously the Member of Parliament for Portsmouth South for the SDP following a by-election in 1984 until 1987.

== Early life ==
Hancock was born in Portsmouth, Hampshire, the son of a Portsmouth naval stoker, growing up on a Portsmouth council estate. He was educated at comprehensive schools in Portsmouth. He worked as an engineer until he was first elected to Parliament, and in the years between his parliamentary career he worked as both a director of the Daytime Club at the BBC and as a district officer for Mencap.

== Political career ==
Hancock joined the Labour Party in 1968, and was elected as a councillor to Portsmouth City Council in 1971. He left the Labour Party and joined the new Social Democratic Party (SDP) in 1981, becoming the leader of the council in 1989. He continued in this role until his second election to the House of Commons, and remained a member for Fratton on the city council until 22 May 2014, when he was defeated. He was also elected to Hampshire County Council in 1973, becoming the leader of the Labour group on the council in 1977 until he left the party, leading the council as a Liberal Democrat between 1993 and 1997, when the creation of Portsmouth Unitary Authority meant that he was no longer eligible to stand.

He contested Portsmouth South for the SDP at the 1983 general election but lost to the sitting Conservative MP Bonner Pink by 12,335 votes. Pink died on 6 May 1984, and Hancock was elected after being a candidate, again for the SDP, at the by-election by 1,341 votes. In his book Time To Declare, the SDP leader David Owen claimed that Hancock's victory prevented a Liberal attempt to subsume the SDP before the 1987 general election. However, Hancock later lost his seat in the 1987 general election to the Conservative David Martin by just 205 votes. He narrowly lost the seat to Martin again at the 1992 general election, this time by just 242 votes. He also contested the European Parliament seat of Wight and Hampshire South in 1994. He returned to parliament at the 1997 general election, defeating Martin by 4,327 votes and held the seat for the Liberal Democrats at each subsequent general election.

He was promoted to the frontbench by Paddy Ashdown in 1997 as the spokesman on foreign and commonwealth affairs until 2000, when he was moved by Charles Kennedy to speak on the environment, transport and the regions, but following the 2001 general election, Hancock returned to the backbenches.

It was reported that he signed nomination forms for more than one candidate in the 2006 Liberal Democrat leadership election, in order to ensure a 'proper contest'.

On 29 March 2015, Hancock announced he would run again in Portsmouth South, this time as an independent candidate. Hancock failed to win the election, as did the official Liberal Democrat candidate; the constituency was gained by the Conservative Party.

=== Committee membership ===
He was member of both the defence select committee from 1999 to 2011 and has been on the Speaker's panel of chairmen since 1999. He is the vice-chairman of the all party groups on Croatia, and Russia.

He was previously chair of the Russia group, until being succeeded by Labour's Chris Bryant, because he was felt to be too lenient towards Moscow: "We were concerned by Mike Hancock's pro-Putin and pro-Medvedev position. That is why I stood against him and ousted him. His research assistant, who provided secretarial support to the group, was incensed and walked out."

Hancock holds various positions on the Council of Europe, including a committee position on the Committee on the Honouring of Obligations and Commitments by Member States of the Council of Europe (Monitoring Committee).

On 18 October 2011, amidst espionage allegations relating to his aide and mistress Katia Zatuliveter, Hancock resigned from his post on the defence select committee. (See below)

=== Political views and stances ===
Hancock has said that he will act to defend the government of Azerbaijan in the British Parliament. He says that he disapproves of criticism of President Ilham Aliyev's regime, and has stated that, in particular, he disapproves of the democratic opposition movement within Azerbaijan. In 2013, he voted against a critical report on political prisoners in Azerbaijan.

Hancock has stated that he does not believe the Armenian genocide actually happened, describing it as a "so-called genocide" based on "dubious historical" claims; in March 2010, he said: "Armenia is like a headless chicken that runs around in circles. They really do not know where to run."

Hancock is a patron of the Captive Animals Protection Society, a charity campaigning for an end to the use of animals in entertainment, including circuses, zoos, the exotic pet trade and the audio-visual industry.

Hancock is a supporter of homoeopathy, having signed several early day motions in support of its continued funding on the National Health Service.

== Russian aide's arrest, espionage allegation and extra-marital affair ==
On 8 August 2010, one of Hancock's parliamentary aides, Russian national Katia Zatuliveter, and her friend were questioned at Gatwick Airport on returning from celebrating her 25th birthday in Croatia. Hancock had met Zatuliveter in Strasbourg where she worked for the Council of Europe. She started working as an aide to Hancock in 2008, after having been an intern at the House of Commons for a while and undergoing security vetting. Until Hancock was ousted as chairman of the All-Party Group on Russia in June 2010, Zatuliveter had been the group's secretary, giving her direct access to all MPs with the greatest interest in Russia and legitimate reason to liaise with the Russian authorities; according to sources at Westminster, Zatuliveter had access to Hancock's private emails, and virtually ran the UK-Russia group.

Reportedly, Zatuliveter had been identified by MI5 (UK Security Service) when surveillance linked her to another person with close links to the Russian embassy in London; the latter was suspected of working for the SVR, Russia's foreign intelligence service.

On 4 December 2010, it was reported that Zatuliveter was facing deportation in Yarl's Wood Immigration Removal Centre, after she was arrested by the Metropolitan Police Service on behalf of MI5 and the Border and Immigration Agency on 2 December 2010, on suspicion of espionage, the police action having been approved by Home Secretary Theresa May. The incident happened in the wake of the uncovering and expulsion of ten Russian sleeper agents in the US in June 2010, including a young woman who had British citizenship, Anna Chapman.

On 5 December 2010, Hancock confirmed the detention of Zatuliveter and advised the media that she was appealing against her potential deportation. In subsequent interviews on the same day, he called the espionage accusations "absolutely ludicrous" commenting further: "I have no reason to believe she did anything but act honourably during the time she was working for me. She is determined to fight her corner and she genuinely believes, and I back her 100%, that she has nothing to hide and has done nothing wrong. If she has, the (security) services are right. But they need to prove their point now."

The media quoted some of Hancock's former Council of Europe's liberal group colleagues as saying that in the 2000s Hancock would usually come to their regular private gatherings alongside a series of young Russian and Ukrainian women – in spite of protests by some of those; Hancock's former colleagues said they had witnessed his assistants using the computers of the Alliance of Liberals and Democrats for Europe, the liberal group secretariat, which were supposed to be protected by a password; apparently his assistants knew the password. Hancock denied claims by Mátyás Eörsi that he had failed to declare all of his visits to Russia, saying that he did not know exactly how many trips he had made to Russia, as his passport had "fallen into the sea". It was also reported that Hancock had allegedly agreed to help another Russian national, 25-year-old Ekaterina Paderina, stay in Britain after she ran into visa problems in the late 1990s.

On 7 December 2010 Russia's Foreign Ministry described the affair as "vaudeville based on a threadbare spy plot" being whipped up by the UK media, which could "only be regarded with pity".

On 9 December 2010, Katerina Zatuliveter filed an appeal against arrest and deportation to Russia; in a statement released by her lawyer Tessa Gregory, Zatuliveter said British authorities had failed to provide evidence of her work not being "conducive to national security"; of MI5 she said: "I fully cooperated with them when they questioned me. I have nothing to hide and was only doing my job as a parliamentary researcher." Also on that day, Alexander Sternik, Russia's chargé d'affaires said of Hancock: "Mike Hancock is one of those people who are known to have a balanced objective and sympathetic approach towards the modern Russia and its foreign policy." Sternik also said that the Russian view of the affair was that Hancock was being targeted because he was a parliamentarian who "showed sympathy and understanding for the modern Russian state"; of Zatuliver's detention he said: "We have not received, although we insisted on this, any clarification as to the motives and the reasons that this detention was made."

At a Special Immigration Appeals Commission (SIAC) hearing on her case begun on 18 October 2011, Zatuliveter admitted to having had a four-year affair with Hancock. She also admitted that she had had affairs with a NATO official, a Dutch diplomat and a senior UN official.

On 29 November 2011, the SIAC delivered its ruling that allowed the appeal; the SIAC's Open Judgment concluded: "Our conclusion, at least on the balance of probabilities, is that she was and is not a Russian agent. [...]" The 2011 SIAC's ruling on Zatuliveter's appeal noted of her relationship with him: "The relationship with Mr Hancock was enduring and genuine on both sides."

== Indecent assault claim ==
In October 2010 a complaint was made against Hancock of indecent assault, which Hampshire Police announced would not be pursued in December 2010 due to insufficient evidence.

In February 2013, a civil suit against Hancock over the same complaint was filed.

In September 2013 the police reopened their investigation, asking that a report for Portsmouth City Council, be handed over. Hancock was then still a Portsmouth councillor, as well as an MP for the city. The report was an investigation into whether Hancock had breached the Councillors Code of Conduct for Portsmouth City Council, the council suspended any action as a result of the report until all other proceedings have concluded. The Police decided after considering the report that Hancock would face no charges in relation to the complaint.

In January 2014, Hancock was suspended from the Liberal Democrats after the party nationally reviewed the report commissioned by Liberal Democrat run Portsmouth City Council which had found "prima facie evidence of his unwelcome sexual approaches" to his constituent. The report, which has not been officially published, had become available to The Guardian in December 2013.

The civil case was scheduled to come to trial in mid-June 2014, but a settlement between the parties emerged on 11 June. A week later, when details of the out of court settlement became public knowledge, Hancock apologised to his constituent (known only under the pseudonym of Annie) via a statement issued by the complainant's solicitors at the High Court in London. Any compensation paid to the complainant was not made publicly known. In part, his statement says: "I understand that you felt degraded. I did not treat you with sufficient respect. I made you feel deeply uncomfortable and discriminated against, and I crossed the line." A psychiatric report on Hancock, who was undergoing treatment at the Priory Hospital in Southampton, confirmed that he was freely able to make such a statement. Hancock resigned from the Liberal Democrats in September 2014 before a disciplinary hearing. The news was disclosed in The Independent on 18 September.

== Personal life ==
Hancock has been married to Jacqueline Elliott (also a former member of Portsmouth City Council until losing her seat in the 2014 elections) since 1967, and has a son and a daughter.

He has been the chairman of the southern region of the NSPCC since 1989 and has been the vice-chairman of Portsmouth Dock since 1992. He was awarded the Commander of the Order of the British Empire in the same year.

Parliament of the United Kingdom
Preceded by Bonner Pink	Member of Parliament for Portsmouth South; 1984 – 1987	Succeeded by David Martin
Preceded by David Martin	Member of Parliament for Portsmouth South; 1997 – 2015	Succeeded by Flick Drummond
