= Leslie Wilson (politician) =

British politician (1876–1955)

The Right Honourable Sir Leslie Wilson GCSI GCMG GCIE DSO PC
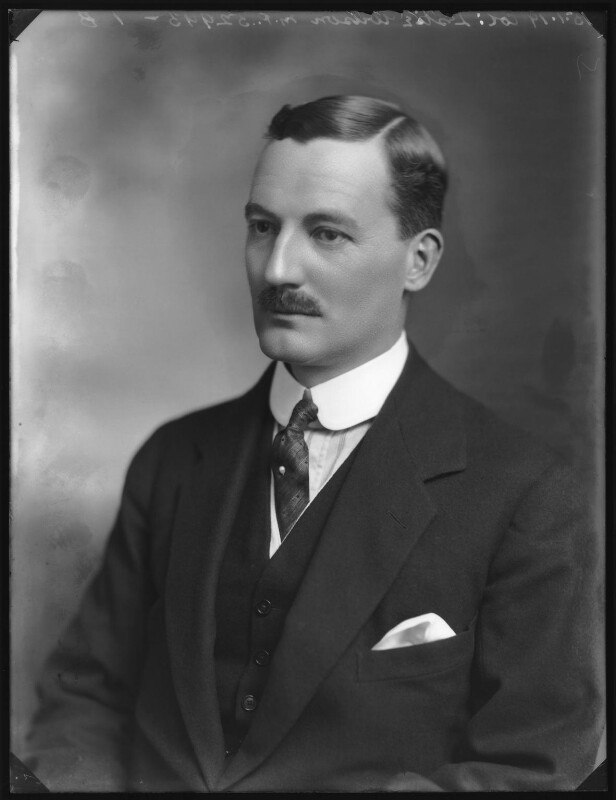

Governor of Bombay
- In office 10 December 1923 – 20 March 1926
- Monarch: George V
- Preceded by: Sir George Lloyd
- Succeeded by: Sir Frederick Sykes

15th Governor of Queensland
- In office 13 June 1932 – 23 April 1946
- Monarchs: George V Edward VIII; George VI
- Preceded by: Sir John Goodwin
- Succeeded by: Sir John Lavarack

Personal details
- Born: Leslie Orme Wilson; 1 August 1876 London, England
- Died: 29 September 1955 (aged 79) Chertsey, Surrey, England
- Spouse: Winifred May Smith

Military service
- Allegiance: United Kingdom
- Branch/service: Royal Marines
- Years of service: 1895–1918
- Rank: Lieutenant Colonel
- Commands: Hawke Battalion, Royal Naval Division
- Battles/wars: Second Boer War; First World War
- Awards: Knight Grand Commander of the Order of the Star of India; Knight Grand Cross of the Order of St Michael and St George; Knight Grand Commander of the Order of the Indian Empire; Distinguished Service Order; Mentioned in Despatches

Sir Leslie Orme Wilson, GCSI, GCMG, GCIE, DSO, PC (1 August 1876 – 29 September 1955) was a British Royal Marines officer, Conservative politician, and colonial governor. He served as Governor of Bombay from 1923 to 1926 and as Governor of Queensland from 1932 to 1946.

== Personal life ==
Wilson was the son of Henry Wilson, a stockbroker, and his wife Ada Alexandrina (née Orme), and was educated at St Michael's School, Westgate, and St Paul's School, London.

Wilson married Winifred May, daughter of Charles Smith, of Sydney, Australia, in 1909. They lived at the Manor House at Waltham St Lawrence in Berkshire. They had three children, two sons and a daughter:

- Peter Leslie Orme, born 4 June 1910 in London, farmer and grazier, died 6 July 1980 aged 70 years in Queensland and buried in Caloundra cemetery;
- David Orme, who was killed on 30 November 1941 in North Africa during World War II;
- Marjorie Leila Orme, born 22 April 1914 at the Manor House, Berkshire, married 1941 John Richards (a former aide-de-camp of her father) in Surrey.

On his retirement as Governor of Queensland, Wilson and his wife Winifred returned to live in Surrey, England. However, they visited Queensland on a number of occasions, including the marriage of their son Peter.

Wilson died after being hit by a truck while walking in September 1955, aged 79. Winifred died at Caloundra, Queensland on 17 June 1959.

== Military service ==
Wilson was commissioned into the Royal Marine Light Infantry and served in the Second Boer War, where he was wounded, mentioned in despatches and awarded the Queen's South Africa Medal with five clasps and the Distinguished Service Order. In 1901 he achieved the rank of captain.

From 1903 to 1909, Wilson served as aide-de-camp to the Governor of New South Wales, Sir Harry Rawson.

During World War I, Wilson commanded Hawke Battalion of the Royal Naval Division with the rank of temporary lieutenant colonel in the Royal Marines and fought at Gallipoli, where he was again mentioned in despatches, and in France, where he was severely wounded.

== Political life ==
In January 1910, at the general election, Wilson unsuccessfully stood as the Conservative candidate for Poplar. In December 1910, he was Unionist candidate for Reading, but was defeated by the sitting Liberal candidate, Sir Rufus Isaacs, the Attorney-General.

In 1913, Wilson was returned to Parliament for Reading, a seat he held until 1922. In 1919 Wilson was appointed Parliamentary Secretary to the Ministry of Shipping in the coalition government headed by David Lloyd George, a position he held until the Ministry of Shipping was abolished in 1921, and then served as Parliamentary Secretary to the Treasury from 1921 to 1922. He was also the Conservative Chief Whip.

At the 1922 general election, Wilson abandoned his Reading constituency to contest the Westminster St. George's division, but was defeated by an Independent Conservative. However within a few weeks he was re-elected at a by-election at Portsmouth South. He was again Parliamentary Secretary to the Treasury from 1922 to 1923 under Bonar Law and later Stanley Baldwin, and was admitted to the Privy Council on 20 June 1922.

== Vice-regal service ==
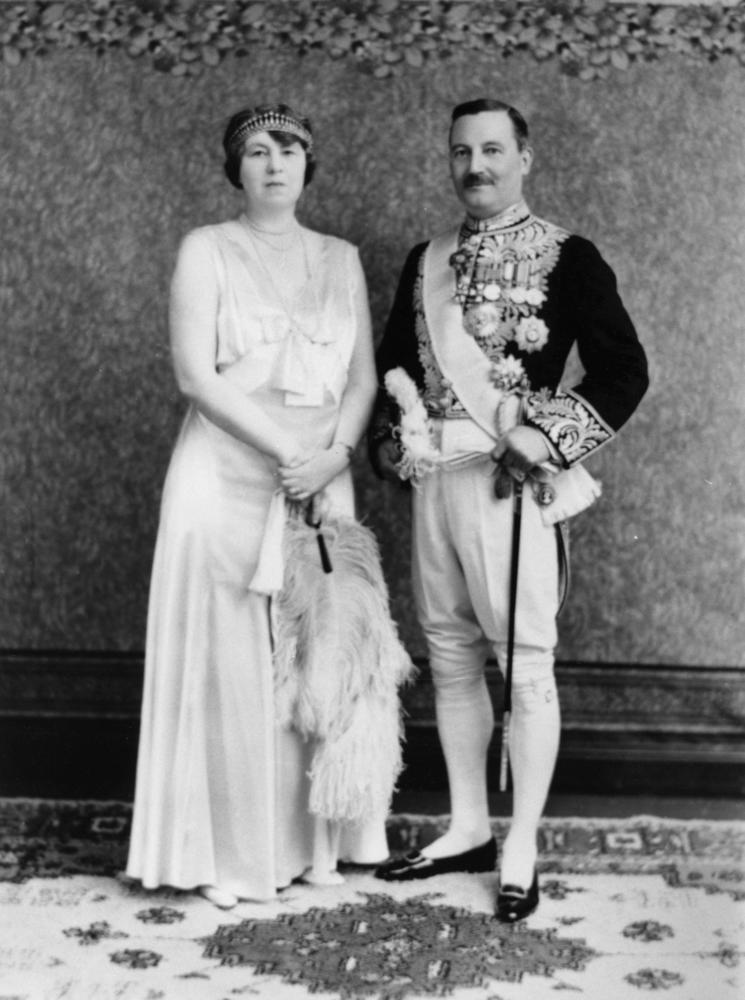
Sir Leslie and Lady Wilson, Queensland c.1933; he is wearing the full dress uniform of a member of HM Privy Council.

=== Governor of Bombay ===
In July 1923, Wilson resigned from this position and his seat in the House of Commons on his appointment as Governor of Bombay. Wilson remained in Bombay until 1928. In the 1929 New Years Honours he was appointed Knight Grand Commander of The Most Exalted Order of the Star of India.

=== Governor of Queensland ===
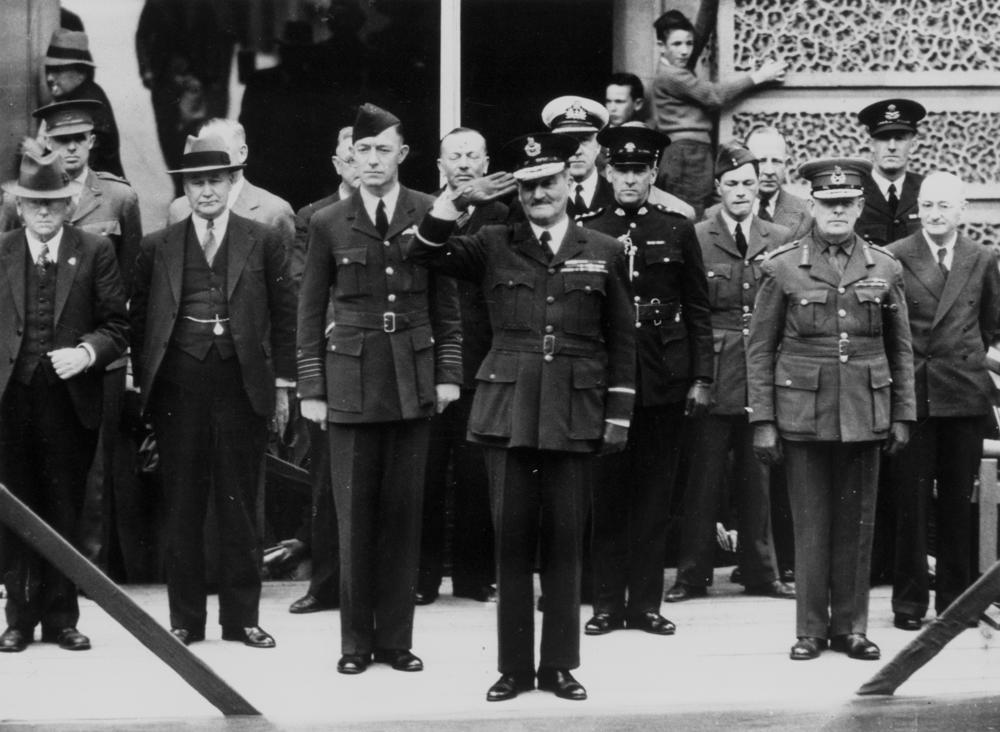
Leslie Wilson in 1941

In 1932, Wilson was made Governor of Queensland, a post he held until 1946, one of the longest gubernatorial tenures in British history. He was the longest-serving governor of the state.

In the early years of his appointment, Wilson toured the state widely and was concerned by the poor health of the children in rural areas due to prolonged drought, the Great Depression, and the distance of medical services. He convened working parties to find a solution, resulting in the 1935 establishment of the Queensland Bush Children’s Health Scheme (now BUSHKids). It brought children from rural areas for six-week summer stays in coastal locations, where the children could enjoy a holiday, while receiving nutrious meals, medical and dental checkups, and appropriate treatments. Children with severe health problems would be flown to major hospitals. The scheme coordinated a number of organisations such as the Red Cross and the Royal Flying Doctor Service to provide the holiday and healthcare arrangements. As at 2021, descendants of the governor remain involved with the service.

On 13 May 1937, Wilson planted a small bunya tree on North Quay, Brisbane to mark the name change of the River Road to Coronation Drive to commemorate the coronation of King George VI.

From 1932 to 1942, Wilson was the Chief Scout of The Boy Scouts Association's Queensland Branch, resigning in 1943 when he disagreed with the decision to make the Chief Commissioner a paid position. His scout name was 'Hawk', for his association with the Hawke Battalion.

== Freemasonry ==
Wilson was a freemason. He was initiated into the craft in the Lodge Ionic No. 65, in Sydney, while serving as an aide-de-camp to Harry Rawson. When he returned to England, in 1909, he became a member of Navy Lodge No. 2612. He became Senior Warden of the Lodge in 1913 and Worshipful Master in 1917. He was the Primus Master of Old Pauline Lodge No. 3969 consecrated on Friday 18 July 1919. In 1922 he was appointed Junior Grand Warden of the United Grand Lodge of England and District Grand Master of Bombay in the following year. To this day there is a Lodge in Pune, Leslie Wilson Lodge No. 4880 EC, named for him. When he was appointed Governor of Queensland, he became Grand Master of Queensland's Grand Lodge serving for 12 years. After arriving in Brisbane aboard the RMS Otranto (1925) on Monday, 13 June 1932, Wilson proceeded to the Queensland Parliament House, where he was sworn in as the 15th Governor of Queensland and representative of His Majesty King George V. At the Regular Meeting of Lamington Lodge, No. 110 UGLQ, held on Thursday, 6 July 1933, a motion was passed that RW Brother Wilson PDGM (Bombay), PGD (England) be accepted as a joining Brother to Lamington Lodge. The Master read a letter from the United Grand Lodge of Queensland, dated Wednesday, 14 June, covering a special dispensation to ballot at the same meeting. After the ballot, the Master declared Wilson was duly elected a member of Lamington Lodge. The following year, on Wednesday, 25 July 1934, Wilson was invested and installed as the Grand Master of the United Grand Lodge of Queensland. He was proclaimed as the Grand Master for the last time, on Wednesday, 24 July 1945, marking his entry upon his twelfth year as the Grand Master.

== Honours ==
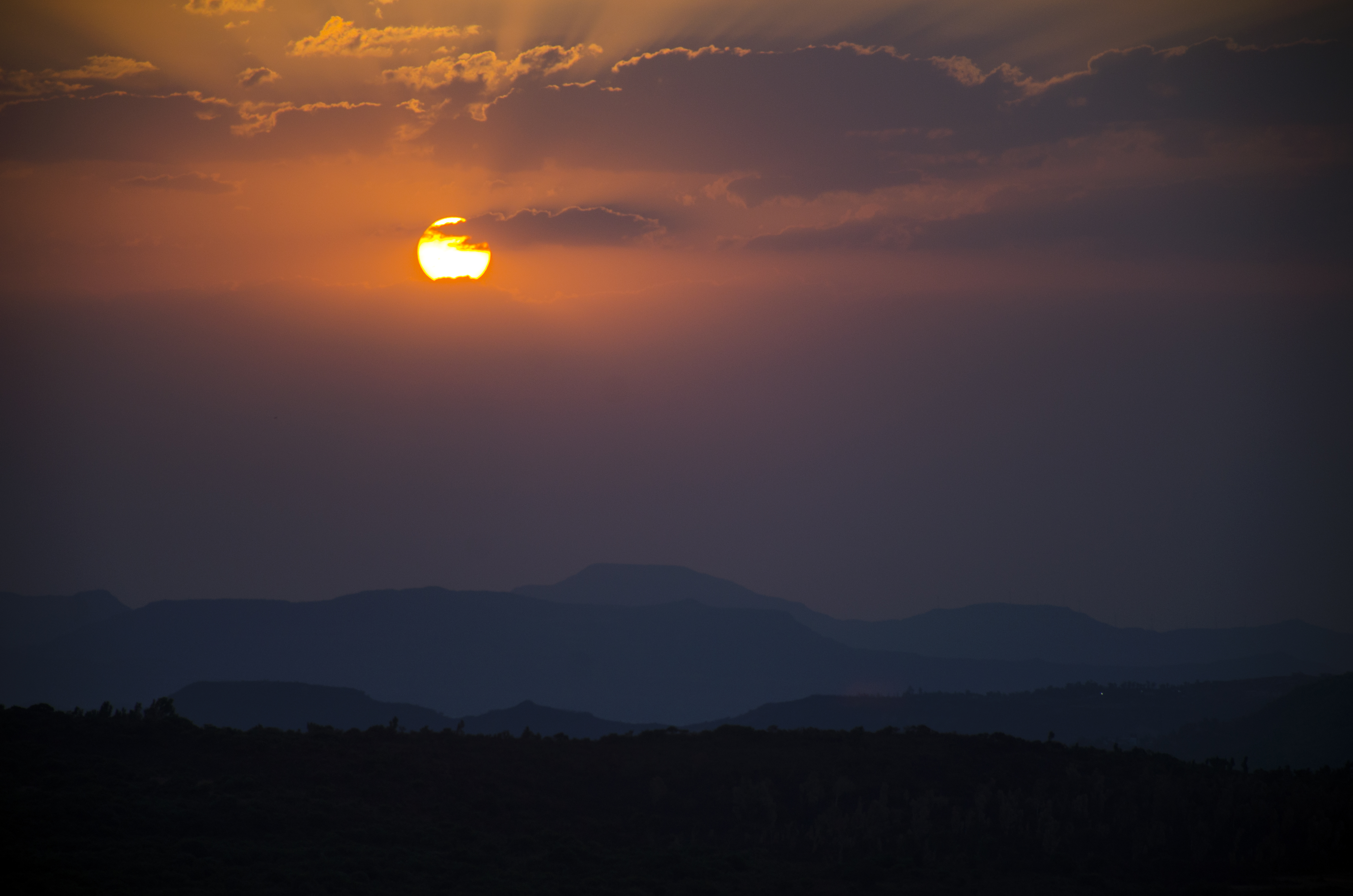
Sunrise at the Wilson Point

Wilson was appointed a Companion of the Order of St Michael and St George 6 September 1916, a Knight Grand Commander of the Order of the Indian Empire 31 October 1923, a Knight Grand Commander of the Order of the Star of India 26 February 1929 and a Knight Grand Cross of the Order of St Michael and St George 2 July 1937.

Wilson locomotive: A WCG-1 class Indian locomotive of the GIPR (locomotive plate no 4502), which is on display at the National Rail museum is named after Leslie Wilson.

Wilson Garden: A locality in Bangalore, called Wilson Garden, is named after Leslie Wilson.

Wilson Point: The highest point in Mahabaleshwar is named after Wilson. Standing at 1439 m it is a popular view point and attracts a large number of tourist, especially during sunrise.

Parliament of the United Kingdom
Preceded by Sir Rufus Isaacs	Member of Parliament for Reading; 1913–1922	Succeeded by Edward Cadogan
Preceded by Herbert Cayzer	Member of Parliament for Portsmouth South; 1922–1923	Succeeded by Herbert Cayzer
Political offices
Preceded by Sir Leo Chiozza Money	Parliamentary Secretary to the Ministry of Shipping; 1919–1921	Succeeded by Office abolished
Preceded by Lord Edmund Talbot; Freddie Guest	Parliamentary Secretary to the Treasury jointly with Charles McCurdy 1921–1922; 1921–1923	Succeeded by Bolton Eyres-Monsell
Government offices
Preceded by Sir George Lloyd	Governor of Bombay; 1923–1928	Succeeded by Sir Frederick Sykes
Preceded by Sir John Goodwin	Governor of Queensland; 1932–1946	Succeeded by Sir John Lavarack
