= 1984 Portsmouth South by-election =

UK parliamentary by-election

- 14 Jun 1984

Constituency of Portsmouth South
- Turnout: 54.5% (▼12.8%)
	First party	Second party	Third party
Candidate	Mike Hancock	Patrick Rock	Sally Thomas
Party	SDP	Conservative	Labour
Popular vote	15,358	14,017	10,846
Percentage	37.6%	34.3%	26.5%
Swing	▲12.1%	▼15.7%	▲4.0%
MP before election
Bonner Pink
Conservative
Subsequent MP
Mike Hancock
SDP

The 1984 Portsmouth South by-election was held on 14 June 1984, following the death of Bonner Pink, the Conservative MP for Portsmouth South.

Portsmouth South was considered a safe seat for the Conservatives. Pink had held the constituency since the 1966 general election, while the party had held the seat since its creation in 1918. At the 1983 general election, Pink had taken just over half the votes cast.

== Candidates ==
The Conservatives stood Patrick Rock.

The Social Democratic Party (SDP) had narrowly taken second place in the constituency in 1983, with just over one quarter of the vote. They stood Mike Hancock, an engineer and member of Hampshire County Council, who had been their unsuccessful candidate in 1983.

The Labour Party had been pushed into third place in 1983, taking 22% of the vote. They also re-stood their candidate from the previous year, Sally Thomas, a supporter of unilateral nuclear disarmament. As Portsmouth South was the headquarters of the Royal Navy, this was a significant issue in the campaign.

Three other candidates had stood in the general election, and two of these stood in the by-election: Gordon Knight of the far right National Front, and Alan Evens who stood as "Liberal for Unilateral Nuclear Disarmament", while four new candidate completed the field. Terry Mitchell stood for the Ecology Party, Thomas Layton stood as "Spare the Earth – Ecology", Anthony Andrews stood as an independent with the slogan "Vote Education: Save Schools & Colleges", and Pete Smith stood for the New National Party.

== Result ==
The SDP unexpectedly gained the seat. The Conservative vote fell sharply, while Labour saw only a small increase. None of the other candidates were able to take 1% of the votes cast.

Hancock lost the seat at the 1987 general election, but was able to retake it in 1997.

Portsmouth South by-election, 1984
Party	Candidate	Votes	%	±%
SDP (Alliance)	Mike Hancock	15,358	37.6	+12.1
Conservative	Patrick Rock	14,017	34.3	−15.7
Labour	Sally Thomas	10,846	26.5	+4.0
National Front	Gordon Knight	226	0.5	0.0
Ecology	Terry Mitchell	190	0.5	New
Independent Liberal	Alan Evens	113	0.3	−0.8
Independent Ecology	Thomas Layton	50	0.1	New
Independent	Anthony Andrews	42	0.1	New
New National Party	Peter Smith	41	0.1	New
Majority		1,341	3.3	N/A
Turnout		40,883	54.5	−12.8
SDP gain from Conservative		Swing	+13.9	
