= Herbert Cayzer, 1st Baron Rotherwick =

British politician

The Right Honourable The Lord Rotherwick Bt DL
- Cayzer in 1924

Member of the House of Lords Lord Temporal
- In office 8 June 1939 – 16 March 1958; Hereditary Peerage
- Preceded by: Peerage created
- Succeeded by: The 2nd Lord Rotherwick

Member of Parliament for Portsmouth South
- In office 13 August 1923 – 8 June 1939
- Preceded by: Leslie Wilson
- Succeeded by: Jocelyn Lucas
- In office 14 December 1918 – 3 December 1922
- Preceded by: Constituency established
- Succeeded by: Leslie Wilson

Personal details
- Born: 23 July 1881
- Died: 16 March 1958 (aged 76)
- Party: Conservative
- Spouse: Freda Penelope

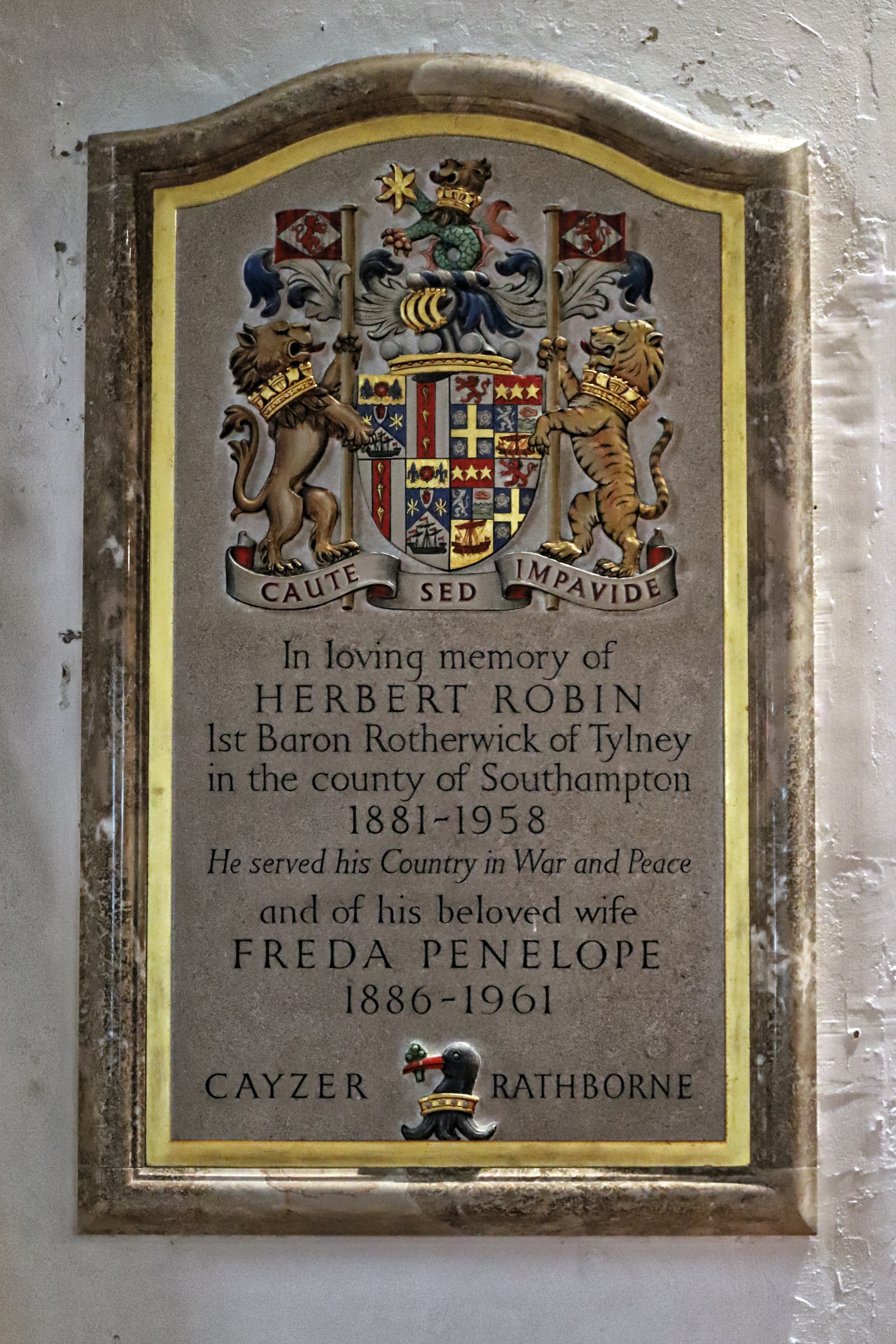
Cayzer and wife Freda memorial at St Andrew's Church, Nuthurst, West Sussex

Herbert Robin Cayzer, 1st Baron Rotherwick DL (23 July 1881 – 16 March 1958), known as Sir Herbert Cayzer, 1st Baronet, from 1924 to 1939, was a British shipping magnate and Conservative Party politician.

Cayzer was the fifth son of Sir Charles Cayzer, 1st Baronet, and his wife Agnes Elisabeth (née Trickey). Sir August Bernard Tellefsen Cayzer, 1st Baronet, was his elder brother. Cayzer was Chairman of the British & Commonwealth Steamship Company Ltd, of Clan Line Steamers Ltd and of the Union Castle Mail Steamship Company Ltd and also sat as Member of Parliament (MP) for Portsmouth South from 1918 to 1922. Shortly after the 1922 general election, he stood down in order that Leslie Wilson, the Chief Whip, could take the seat – Wilson had been defeated in his own constituency. Cayzer stood for Portsmouth South again at the 1923 general election and was returned to Parliament, holding the seat until 1939. He was created a Baronet, of Tylney in the County of Southampton, in 1924 and in 1939 he was raised to the peerage as Baron Rotherwick, of Tylney in the County of Southampton.

Lord Rotherwick married Freda Penelope, daughter of William Hans Rathbourne, in 1911. He died in March 1958, aged 76, and was succeeded in his titles by his eldest son Herbert. Lady Rotherwick died in 1961.

== Notes ==
Parliament of the United Kingdom
New constituency	Member of Parliament for Portsmouth South; 1918 – 1922	Succeeded by Leslie Wilson
Preceded by Leslie Wilson	Member of Parliament for Portsmouth South; 1923 – 1939	Succeeded by Sir Jocelyn Lucas
Peerage of the United Kingdom
New creation	Baron Rotherwick; 1939–1958	Succeeded by Herbert Robin Cayzer
Baronetage of the United Kingdom
New creation	Baronet (of Tylney); 1924–1958	Succeeded by Herbert Cayzer
