= Bonner Pink =

British politician (1912–1984)

Bonner Pink CBE

Member of Parliament for Portsmouth South
- In office 31 March 1966 – 6 May 1984
- Preceded by: Jocelyn Lucas
- Succeeded by: Mike Hancock

Personal details
- Born: Ralph Bonner Pink; 30 September 1912 Portsmouth, England
- Died: 6 May 1984 (aged 71) Portsmouth, England
- Party: Conservative
- Spouse: Marguerite Bannar-Martin (m. 1939)
- Children: 2

Ralph Bonner Pink CBE (30 September 1912 – 6 May 1984) was a British Conservative politician.

Pink was born in Portsmouth on 30 September 1912. He was educated at Oundle School and was a company director. He served as a councillor on Portsmouth City Council (1948–61), then as an alderman, and was Lord Mayor of Portsmouth for 1961–62. In 1961, he was appointed CBE.

Pink was the Member of Parliament for Portsmouth South from 1966 until he died in office at St Mary's Hospital, Portsmouth, on 6 May 1984, at the age of 71. He was a member of the Speaker's panel of chairmen.

In 1939, Pink married Marguerite Bannar-Martin, with whom he had two children.

Parliament of the United Kingdom
| Preceded by Sir Jocelyn Lucas, Bt. | Member of Parliament for Portsmouth South; 1966 – 1984 | Succeeded by Mike Hancock |
