= 1922 Portsmouth South by-election =

UK Parliamentary by-election

A by-election was held in Portsmouth South on 13 December 1922. The by-election was held due to the resignation of the incumbent Conservative MP, Herbert Cayzer. It was won by the Conservative candidate Leslie Orme Wilson.

== Result ==
Portsmouth South by-election, 1922
Party	Candidate	Votes	%	±%
Unionist	Leslie Orme Wilson	14,301	62.9	−5.8
Ind. Unionist	G. C. Thomas	4,834	37.1	New
Majority		5,867	25.8	−11.6
Turnout		22,735	57.7	
Unionist hold		Swing		
