= 1939 Portsmouth South by-election =

UK parliamentary by-election

The 1939 Portsmouth South by-election was a parliamentary by-election held in the United Kingdom on 12 July 1939 for the House of Commons constituency of Portsmouth South, in Hampshire.

== Previous result ==
General election, 14 November 1935: Portsmouth South
Party	Candidate	Votes	%	±%
Conservative	Herbert Cayzer	27,416	75.2	−5.7
Labour	John W. Fawcett	9,043	24.8	+5.7
Majority		18,373	50.4	−11.4
Turnout		36,459	66.9	−5.8
Conservative hold		Swing	-5.7	

== Result ==
Sir Jocelyn Morton Lucas was elected unopposed for the Conservative Party.

== Aftermath ==
In the 1945 general election, the Conservatives held the seat.

General election, 5 July 1945
Party	Candidate	Votes	%	±%
Conservative	Jocelyn Lucas	15,810	55.3	−19.9
Labour	J.F. Blitz	12,783	44.7	+19.9
Majority		3,027	10.6	−39.8
Turnout		28,593	74.9	+8.0
Conservative hold		Swing	-19.9	
