= Independent Ecology =

Independent Ecology was a description used in British politics to denote a form of non-party affiliation. It was used to designate a green politician as was independent of any political party, particularly of the Ecology Party before its transformation into the Green Party.

Since the Registration of Political Parties Act 1998 came into force, a candidate for election can no longer be described as an "Independent Ecology" on a ballot paper, as the 1998 Act prohibits any description which could cause confusion with a registered political party. In practice, the description used is either the name of a registered party or the word "Independent".
