= Portsmouth Independents Party =

- Abbreviation: PIP
- Leader: Emily Strudwick
- Founder: George Madgwick
- Founded: 2021
- Registered: 17 August 2021; 5 years ago
- Headquarters: Portsmouth, Hampshire
- Ideology: Localism
- Political position: Centre
- Colours: Violet
- Portsmouth City Council: 0 / 42

Website
- www.portsmouthindependents.co.uk

The Portsmouth Independents Party (PIP) is a local political party in the United Kingdom. Based in Portsmouth, England, it was formed in 2021 by George Madgwick, an independent councillor for Portsmouth City Council, who subsequently switched to Reform UK. The party currently has no councillors on the city council.

== History ==
George Madgwick was elected as an independent councillor to Portsmouth City Council from Paulsgrove ward during the 2021 elections. He formed the PIP later that year.

In the 2022 elections PIP stood in 8 of the 14 city council seats up for election, winning in 2. After the election, Madgwick told the PIP's annual general meeting that the party aimed to stand candidates in every ward at the next election. Leader George Madgwick also contested the Southwick and Wickham ward of Winchester City Council in 2022, which borders Portsmouth, albeit standing as an independent. A Conservative councillor accused of printing ‘lies’ about Madgwick in an election material settled a legal action and issued a formal apology.

In the 2023 elections PIP stood in 13 of 14 city council seats up for election, winning in 3.

In the 2024 elections PIP stood in 12 of the 14 city council seats up for election, winning in 4, increasing their vote share and ending in second place in terms of seats won behind the Liberal Democrats. Madgwick, based on vote share, became the most electorally successful Paulsgrove candidate in the ward's history according to city council records, with 64% of the vote.

PIP, now the opposition party after 3 years, is targeting control of the council at the 2026 election.

During the 2024 United Kingdom general election, party leader Madgwick personally endorsed the Conservative candidate Penny Mordaunt for the Portsmouth North constituency after declining an offer to stand for Reform UK. PIP ran a parliamentary candidate, Jacob Short, for the Portsmouth South constituency. He finished last with 733 votes (1.9% of the vote), losing his deposit.

In a Full Council meeting in March 2025 Portsmouth Independent Party were the only group to all not vote for pay increases for selected councillors. This is the first time a local party has voted against such increases to their extra responsibility pay. All the National Parties in Portsmouth voted to increase their pay.

On the 23 July 2025, PIP Leader George Madgwick defected to Reform UK, which he announced on his Facebook page, partially due to Local Government Reorganisation which could lead to Portsmouth being replaced with a larger authority covering Portsmouth, Fareham, Gosport and Havant, as well as stating his desire to go into national politics. PIP Councillor Raymond Dent also defected. Cllr Emily Strudwick became the new leader, thanking Cllrs Madgwick and Dent for their work. On 16 October 2025, four more PIP councillors joined Reform UK, leaving PIP with just two councillors. The remaining two councillors defected to Reform in February 2026.

=== Criminal charges against founder ===
On 3 November 2026, the Crown Prosecution Service announced that George Madgwick, the party's founder and former leader, had been charged with 35 offences relating to four complainants. The offences are alleged to have taken place between 2008 and 2021 in Portsmouth and Wales. The charges include 12 counts of rape, as well as counts of sexual assault, assault by penetration and offences relating to indecent images of a child, together with charges of making a threat to kill, false imprisonment and stalking.

Hampshire and Isle of Wight Constabulary stated that its investigation began in July 2025 following a report of a sexual offence. Madgwick had left the party for Reform UK in July 2025 and was leader of the Reform UK group on Hampshire County Council. Reform UK said he had been suspended from the party with immediate effect. He is due to appear at Portsmouth Magistrates' Court on 25 November 2026. The charges have yet to be tested in court.

== Election results ==
Year	Votes	%	+/-	Councillors	Control
2022	5,952	13.0	Steady	3 / 42	No overall control
2023	6,995	16.2	▲3.2	6 / 42	No overall control
2024	9,578	23.0	▲6.9	9 / 42	No overall control
2026	0	0		0 / 42	No overall control
