= 2022 Portsmouth City Council election =

← 2021	5 May 2022	2023 →

14 out of 42 seats to Portsmouth City Council 22 seats needed for a majority
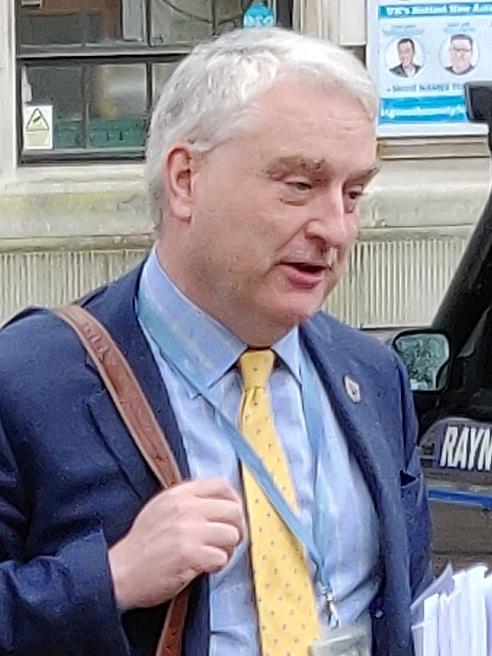
	First party	Second party
		Con
Leader	Gerald Vernon-Jackson	Simon Bosher
Party	Liberal Democrats	Conservative
Leader's seat	Milton	Drayton & Farlington
Seats before	15	17
Seats won	5	2
Seats after	17	13
Seat change	▲2	▼4
Popular vote	11,882	12,037
Percentage	25.9%	26.2%
Swing	▲0.6%	▼10.5%
	Third party	Fourth party
	Lab	PIP
Leader	George Fielding	George Madgwick
Party	Labour	PIP
Leader's seat	Central Southsea	Paulsgrove
Seats before	7	1
Seats won	5	2
Seats after	9	3
Seat change	▲2	▲2
Popular vote	14,324	5,952
Percentage	31.2%	13.0%
Swing	▼0.3%	N/A
- Winner of each seat at the 2022 Portsmouth City Council election
Council control before election
No Overall Control
(Lib Dem minority)
Council control after election
No Overall Control
(Lib Dem minority)

Elections to Portsmouth City Council took place on Thursday 5 May 2022, alongside other local elections across the country. The seats contested in this election were last contested in 2018. The Conservative Party had 6 seats they were defending, while the Liberal Democrats and Labour were both defending 4 seats. No party gained a majority from this election, and therefore the council remains under no overall control, with the Liberal Democrats continuing to run the council in a minority.

== Election results ==
Immediately ahead of this election, the composition of the council was:

↓
15	7	17	1	2
Liberal Democrats	Labour	Conservative	PI	P

After the election result, the composition of the council became:

↓
17	9	13	3
Liberal Democrats	Labour	Conservative	PI

== Results summary ==
2022 Portsmouth City Council election
Party	This election			Full council			This election		
Party	Seats	Net	Seats %	Other	Total	Total %	Votes	Votes %	+/−
Liberal Democrats	5	▲1	35.7	12	17	40.5	11,882	25.9	▲0.6
Conservative	2	▼4	14.3	11	13	31.0	12,037	26.2	▼10.5
Labour	5	▲1	35.7	4	9	21.4	14,324	31.2	▼0.3
PIP	2	▲2	14.3	1	3	7.1	5,952	13.0	N/A
Green	0	Steady	0.0	0	0	0.0	1,498	3.3	▼0.4
Independent	0	Steady	0.0	0	0	0.0	135	0.3	▼0.3
TUSC	0	Steady	0.0	0	0	0.0	73	0.2	N/A

== Ward results ==
Comparisons for the purpose of determining a gain, hold or loss of a seat, and for all percentage changes, is to the last time these specific seats were up for election in 2018. An asterisk indicates the incumbent councillor.

=== Baffins ===
Baffins
Party	Candidate	Votes	%	±%
Liberal Democrats	Abdul Kadir	1,391	36.9	−0.5
PIP	Paul Oakley-Cleife	760	20.2	N/A
Conservative	Charlie Douglas	757	20.1	−13.7
Labour	Jason Christopher	568	15.1	−5.8
Green	Bob Simmonds	155	4.1	0.6
Independent	Jeanette Smith*	135	3.6	N/A
Majority		631	16.7	+13.1
Turnout		3,788	34.3	+0.2
Liberal Democrats hold		Swing		

=== Central Southsea ===
Central Southsea
Party	Candidate	Votes	%	±%
Labour	George Fielding*	1,849	47.9	+3.8
Liberal Democrats	Sarah Shreeve	1,410	36.5	+1.2
Conservative	Jack Jackson	411	10.6	−5.5
Green	Menno Groen	193	5.0	+1.6
Majority		439	11.4	+2.6
Turnout		3,878	32.9	+3.1
Labour hold		Swing		

=== Charles Dickens ===
Charles Dickens
Party	Candidate	Votes	%	±%
Labour	Yinka Adeniran	1,216	49.5	+15.6
Conservative	Renu Raj	451	18.3	−6.6
Liberal Democrats	Maria Cole	379	15.4	−13.9
PIP	Chris Dike	370	15.0	N/A
TUSC	Chris Pickett	43	1.7	N/A
Majority		765	31.2	
Turnout		2,469	18.5	−1.2
Labour hold		Swing		

=== Copnor ===
Copnor
Party	Candidate	Votes	%	±%
Conservative	Ben Swann*	1,062	33.9	−12.9
PIP	Raymond Dent	922	29.4	N/A
Labour	Mary Vallely	664	21.2	−7.3
Green	Tim Sheerman-Chase	280	8.9	+4.4
Liberal Democrats	Gordon Candlish	203	6.5	−8.1
Majority		140	4.5	−13.9
Turnout		3,138	32.2	+2.8
Conservative hold		Swing		

=== Cosham ===
Cosham
Party	Candidate	Votes	%	±%
Labour	Asghar Shah	1,639	47.7	+16.6
Conservative	Hannah Hockaday*	1,410	41.0	−11.7
PIP	Mike Jerome	207	6.0	N/A
Liberal Democrats	Helena Cole	180	5.2	−1.8
Majority		229	6.7	
Turnout		3,454	33.6	3.9
Labour gain from Conservative		Swing		

=== Drayton & Farlington ===
Drayton & Farlington
Party	Candidate	Votes	%	±%
Conservative	Simon Bosher*	1,987	54.2	−13.1
Labour	Pooja Jha	831	22.7	+1.2
PIP	Tom Oulds	472	12.9	N/A
Liberal Democrats	Delwar Baig	376	10.3	+1.5
Majority		1,156	31.5	−11.9
Turnout		3,676	35.1	−1.7
Conservative hold		Swing		

=== Eastney & Craneswater ===
Eastney & Craneswater
Party	Candidate	Votes	%	±%
Liberal Democrats	Matthew Winnington	1,380	34.0	+10.1
Conservative	Scott Green	1,112	27.4	−16.2
Labour	Craig Withey	995	24.5	−3.8
PIP	Lee Tindal	575	14.2	N/A
Majority		268	6.6	
Turnout		4,079	42.0	Steady
Liberal Democrats gain from Conservative		Swing		

=== Fratton ===
Fratton
Party	Candidate	Votes	%	±%
Labour	Tom Coles*	1,214	43.5	+6.0
Liberal Democrats	David Fuller	1,094	39.2	+4.2
Conservative	Paul Sweeney	484	17.3	−1.1
Majority		120	4.3	1.8
Turnout		2,813	26.5	−2.0
Labour hold		Swing		

=== Hilsea ===
Hilsea
Party	Candidate	Votes	%	±%
PIP	Russell Simpson	1,097	35.6	N/A
Conservative	Frank Jonas*	1,075	34.8	−22.6
Labour	Julian Lewis	624	20.2	−8.4
Liberal Democrats	Peter Williams	173	5.6	−1.8
Green	Emma Murphy	116	3.8	−2.8
Majority		22	0.8	
Turnout		3,091	30.6	+1.3
PIP gain from Conservative		Swing		

=== Milton ===
Milton
Party	Candidate	Votes	%	±%
Liberal Democrats	Steve Pitt	1,651	40.3	+1.4
Labour	Paula Savage	1,613	39.4	+7.6
Conservative	David Chandler	630	15.4	−6.2
Green	Sarah Gilbert	198	4.8	−0.1
Majority		38	0.9	−9.0
Turnout		4,121	39.2	−2.6
Liberal Democrats hold		Swing		

=== Nelson ===
Nelson
Party	Candidate	Votes	%	±%
Liberal Democrats	Jason Fazackarley*	1,109	46.2	+6.1
Labour	Aimee-Louise Geyther	584	24.8	−2.6
Conservative	Spencer Gardner	539	22.5	+0.3
Green	Duncan Robinson	128	5.3	−0.4
TUSC	Nick Doyle	30	1.3	N/A
Majority		525	21.4	+8.7
Turnout		2,401	23.3	+3.9
Liberal Democrats hold		Swing		

=== Paulsgrove ===
Paulsgrove
Party	Candidate	Votes	%	±%
PIP	Brian Madgwick	1,549	55.6	N/A
Conservative	Andy Macfarlane	719	25.8	−19.9
Labour	Raj Ghosh	406	14.6	+26.4
Liberal Democrats	Nicky Dodd	112	4.0	−2.6
Majority		830	29.8	
Turnout		2,796	27.5	+1.1
PIP gain from Conservative		Swing		

=== St. Jude ===
St. Jude
Party	Candidate	Votes	%	±%
Labour	Judith Smyth*	1,360	40.2	+3.8
Liberal Democrats	Martin Northern	1,161	34.4	+9.6
Conservative	Alicia Denny	617	18.3	−15.1
Green	Ian McCulloch	241	7.1	+1.7
Majority		199	5.8	+2.8
Turnout		3,397	36.6	+1.6
Labour hold		Swing		

=== St. Thomas ===
St. Thomas
Party	Candidate	Votes	%	±%
Liberal Democrats	Mark Jeffery	1,263	42.2	+7.6
Conservative	Robert Johnson	783	26.2	−4.2
Labour	Joshua Allen	761	25.4	−5.0
Green	Elliott Lee	187	6.2	+1.7
Majority		480	16.0	+11.8
Turnout		3,006	27.6	−5.7
Liberal Democrats hold		Swing		
