= 2023 Portsmouth City Council election =

2023 UK local government election

← 2022	4 May 2023	2024 →

14 out of 42 seats to Portsmouth City Council 22 seats needed for a majority

	First party	Second party
Leader	Gerald Vernon-Jackson	Simon Bosher
Party	Liberal Democrats	Conservative
Leader's seat	Milton	Drayton & Farlington
Last election	6 (2019)	7 (2019)
Seats before	17	13
Seats won	7	1
Seats after	18	8
Seat change	▲1	▼6
Popular vote	12,682	8,464
Percentage	29.3%	19.6%
Swing	▲0.1%	▼5.3%
	Third party	Fourth party
Leader	Charlotte Gerada	George Madgwick
Party	Labour	PIP
Leader's seat	Southsea Central	Paulsgrove
Last election	2 (2019)	did not contest
Seats before	6	3
Seats won	2	3
Seats after	7	6
Seat change	Steady	▲3
Popular vote	11,904	6,995
Percentage	27.5%	16.2%
Swing	▼2.5%	▲16.2%
Leader before election
Gerald Vernon-Jackson
Liberal Democrats
No overall control
Leader after election
Steve Pitt
Liberal Democrats
No overall control

The 2023 Portsmouth City Council election took place on 4 May 2023 to elect members of Portsmouth City Council in Hampshire, England. This was on the same day as other local elections across England.

The council remained under no overall control, being led by a Liberal Democrat minority administration.

Immediately after the election the Liberal Democrat leader of the council, Gerald Vernon-Jackson, announced he was stepping down from the role. He was replaced at the subsequent annual council meeting on 16 May 2023 by Steve Pitt.

== Summary ==
=== Election result ===
The overall results were:

2023 Portsmouth City Council election
Party	This election			Full council			This election		
Party	Seats	Net	Seats %	Other	Total	Total %	Votes	Votes %	+/−
Liberal Democrats	7	▲1	50.0	11	18	42.9	12,682	29.3%	▼0.1
Labour	2	Steady	14.3	5	7	16.7	11,904	27.5%	▲2.2
Conservative	1	▼5	7.1	7	8	19.0	8,464	19.6%	▼5.5
PIP	3	▲3	21.4	3	6	14.3	6,995	16.2%	N/A
Independent	1	▲1	7.1	2	3	7.1	910	2.1%	N/A
Green	0	Steady	0.0	0	0	0.0	1,902	4.4%	▼1.4
Reform UK	0	Steady	0.0	0	0	0.0	244	0.6%	N/A
NHA	0	Steady	0.0	0	0	0.0	86	0.2%	▼0.5
TUSC	0	Steady	0.0	0	0	0.0	43	0.1%	N/A

== Ward results ==
Comparisons for the purpose of determining a gain, hold or loss of a seat, and for all percentage changes, is to the last time these specific seats were up for election in 2019. An asterisk indicates the incumbent councillor. The results for each ward were:

=== Baffins ===
Baffins
Party	Candidate	Votes	%	±%
Liberal Democrats	Leonie Oliver	1,475	42.2	▼2.6
PIP	Paul Oakley-Cleife	740	21.2	New
Conservative	Joe Standen	632	18.1	▼3.0
Labour	Mark Farwell	488	14.0	▲1.2
Green	Bob Simmonds	152	4.3	▼2.2
Majority		735	21.0	
Turnout		3,497	31.6	
Registered electors		11,047		
Liberal Democrats hold		Swing		

=== Central Southsea ===
Central Southsea
Party	Candidate	Votes	%	±%
Liberal Democrats	Suzy Horton*	1,816	47.2	▲1.5
Labour	Joshua Allen	1,551	40.3	▲8.3
Conservative	Alicia Denny	214	5.6	▼2.9
Green	Menno Groen	178	4.6	▼2.4
PIP	Lee Tindal	86	2.2	New
Majority		265	6.9	
Turnout		3845	32.7	
Registered electors		11,763		
Liberal Democrats hold		Swing		

=== Charles Dickens ===
Charles Dickens
Party	Candidate	Votes	%	±%
Independent	Cal Corkery*	910	37.4	New
Labour	Raj Ghosh	780	32.1	▼7.7
Liberal Democrats	Yahiya Chowdhury	337	13.9	▼10.1
Conservative	Terry Henderson	301	12.4	▲2.5
Green	Ian McCulloch	104	4.3	▲2.2
Majority		130	5.4	
Turnout		2,432		
Registered electors				
Independent gain from Labour		Swing		

=== Copnor ===
Copnor
Party	Candidate	Votes	%	±%
PIP	Raymond Dent	1,391	46.0	New
Conservative	Spencer Gardner	725	24.0	▼12.5
Labour	Arif Choudhury	597	19.7	▼2.9
Liberal Democrats	Nicky Dodd	202	6.7	▼5.8
Green	Ben Warner	112	3.7	▼2.8
Majority		666	22.0	
Turnout		3,027		
Registered electors				
PIP gain from Conservative		Swing		

=== Cosham ===
Cosham
Party	Candidate	Votes	%	±%
Labour	Mary Vallely	1,362	46.4	▲24.8
Conservative	Lee Mason*	1,078	36.7	▲5.9
PIP	Tom Oulds^{1}	208	7.1	New
Liberal Democrats	David Fuller	200	6.8	▲}5.4
NHA	Veronika Wagner	86	2.9	▼6.9
Majority		284	9.7%	
Turnout		2,934		
Registered electors		10,218		
Labour gain from Conservative		Swing		

1: After nominations were closed, Oulds was suspended by the Portsmouth Independents following "unacceptable" message on social media.

=== Drayton and Farlington ===
Drayton & Farlington
Party	Candidate	Votes	%	±%
Conservative	Hannah Brent	1,654	47.7	▼6.9
Labour	Pooja Jha	693	20.0	▼0.7
Liberal Democrats	Richard Adair	620	17.9	▲6.5
PIP	Jaime Custerson	280	8.1	New
Green	Mervyn Harvey	224	6.5	New
Majority		961	27.7	
Turnout		3,471		
Registered electors		10,518		
Conservative hold		Swing		

=== Eastney and Craneswater ===
Eastney and Craneswater
Party	Candidate	Votes	%	±%
Liberal Democrats	Peter Candlish	1,385	36.4	▲11.4
Labour	Jane Shepherd	1,088	28.6	▲6.0
Conservative	Stephen Gorys	881	23.2	▼11.8
Green	Tamara Groen	209	5.5	▼1.5
Reform UK	Mark Zimmer	148	3.9	New
PIP	Jenny Dobson	93	2.4	New
Majority		297	7.8	
Turnout		3,804		
Registered electors		9,698		
Liberal Democrats gain from Conservative		Swing		

=== Fratton ===
Fratton
Party	Candidate	Votes	%	±%
Liberal Democrats	Dave Ashmore*	1,051	38.1	▼0.5
Labour	Aimee-Louise Gwyther	840	30.4	▲1.9
PIP	Jacob Short	457	16.6	New
Conservative	Peter Ross	248	9.0	▼0.7
Green	Samet Alves	139	5.0	▼4.8
TUSC	Chris Pickett	24	0.9	New
Majority		211	7.6	
Turnout				
Registered electors				
Liberal Democrats hold		Swing		

=== Hilsea ===
Hilsea
Party	Candidate	Votes	%	±%
PIP	Emily Strudwick	1,867	57.3	New
Conservative	Scott Payter-Harris*	734	22.5	▼14.5
Labour	Mariam Daniel	413	12.7	▼9.2
Liberal Democrats	Peter Williams	146	4.5	▼8.8
Green	Emma Murphy	99	3.0	▼6.6
Majority		1,133	34.8	
Turnout		3,259	32.6	
Registered electors				
PIP gain from Conservative		Swing		

=== Milton ===
Milton
Party	Candidate	Votes	%	±%
Liberal Democrats	Gerald Vernon-Jackson*	1,872	46.6	▲1.1
Labour	Paula Savage	1,552	38.7	▲12.3
Conservative	Jack Smith	252	6.3	▼5.3
Green	Sarah Gilbert	176	4.4	▼2.6
Reform UK	Rachel Zimmer	96	2.4	New
PIP	Gemma Hammond	67	1.7	New
Majority		320	8	
Turnout		4015		
Registered electors		10,539		
Liberal Democrats hold		Swing		

=== Nelson ===
Nelson
Party	Candidate	Votes	%	±%
Liberal Democrats	Lee Hunt*	1,033	47.8	▲4.6
Labour	Robin Head	498	23.0	▲4.9
Conservative	Kerryanne Swann	323	14.9	▲0.5
PIP	Henry Thorpe	169	7.8	New
Green	Duncan Robinson	121	5.6	▼1.2
TUSC	Nicholas Doyle	19	0.9	New
Majority				
Turnout		2,163	21.78	
Registered electors				
Liberal Democrats hold		Swing		

=== Paulsgrove ===
Paulsgrove
Party	Candidate	Votes	%	±%
PIP	Chris Dike	1,279	55.9	New
Conservative	Charlie Douglas	446	19.5	▼17.5
Labour	Eloise Hadenham	425	18.6	▼7.1
Liberal Democrats	Catherine Cole	136	5.9	▼2.1
Majority		833	36.4	
Turnout				
Registered electors				
PIP gain from Conservative		Swing		

=== St Jude ===
St Jude
Party	Candidate	Votes	%	±%
Labour	Graham Heaney*	1,288	39.9	▲7.3
Liberal Democrats	Martin Northern	1,058	32.8	▲6.7
Conservative	David Chandler	400	12.4	▼11.1
PIP	Richard Peckham	283	8.8	New
Green	Harry Mallinder	201	6.2	▼3.3
Majority		230	7.1	
Turnout		3,230		
Registered electors		9,206		
Labour hold		Swing		

=== St Thomas ===
St Thomas
Party	Candidate	Votes	%	±%
Liberal Democrats	Chris Attwell*	1,351	46.9	▲6.9
Labour	Edward Batterbury	689	23.9	▼1.0
Conservative	Paul Sweeney	576	20.0	▼1.9
Green	Elliott Lee	187	6.5	▲0.9
PIP	George Miles	75	2.6	New
Majority		662	23.0	
Turnout		2,878		
Registered electors		10,927		
Liberal Democrats hold		Swing		
