= 2024 Portsmouth City Council election =

Local election in Portsmouth, England

- 2 May 2024

14 out of 42 seats to Portsmouth City Council 22 seats needed for a majority

	Majority party	Minority party	Third party
Leader	Steve Pitt	George Madgwick	Charlotte Gerada
Party	Liberal Democrats	PIP	Labour
Seats before	18	6	8
Seats after	19	9	8
Seat change	▲1	▲3	Steady
Popular vote	12,492	9,578	11,556
Percentage	30.0%	23.0%	27.7%
Swing	▲0.7%	▲6.8%	▲0.2%
	Fourth party	Fifth party
Leader	Simon Bosher
Party	Conservative	Independent
Seats before	8	2
Seats after	4	2
Seat change	▼4	Steady
Popular vote	6,745	N/A
Percentage	16.2%	N/A
Swing	▼3.4%	▼2.1%
- Winner of each seat at the 2024 Portsmouth City Council election
Leader before election
Steve Pitt
Liberal Democrats
No overall control
Leader after election
Steve Pitt
Liberal Democrats
No overall control

The 2024 Portsmouth City Council election took place on Thursday 2 May 2024, alongside the other local elections in the United Kingdom on the same day. 14 of the 42 members of Portsmouth City Council in Hampshire were elected.

The council remained under no overall control, being led by a Liberal Democrat minority administration.

== Background ==
Portsmouth was created as a unitary authority in 1997. Labour controlled the council from its creation until 2000, when the council fell into no overall control. The Liberal Democrats first won the council in 2010, and held a majority until 2014. The Conservatives ran the council as a minority administration, with support from UKIP, until 2018, when the Liberal Democrats formed a minority administration which has governed Portsmouth since. In the previous election, the Liberal Democrats won 7 seats (up 1) with 29.3% of the vote, Labour won 2 with 27.5%, the Conservatives won 1 (down 5) with 19.6%, the Portsmouth Independent Party won 3 (up 3) with 16.2%, and independents won 1 (up 1) with 2.1%.

The seats up for election in 2024 were last contested in 2021; because of the delay of all local elections due to the COVID-19 pandemic, the seats are up for election after 3 years rather than the usual 4. In that election, the Conservatives gained 1 seat with 36.0% of the vote, the Liberal Democrats lost 2 with 26.6%, Labour held their 2 seats up for election with 28.0%, and independents gained 1 with 3.7%.

== Previous council composition ==
After 2023 election		Before 2024 election		After 2024 election	
Party	Seats	Party	Seats	Party	Seats
Liberal Democrats	18	Liberal Democrats	18	Liberal Democrats	19
Labour	7	Labour	8	Labour	8
Conservative	8	Conservative	8	Conservative	4
PIP	6	PIP	6	PIP	9
Independent	3	Independent	2	Independent	2

== Results summary ==
2024 Portsmouth City Council election
Party	This election			Full council			This election		
Party	Seats	Net	Seats %	Other	Total	Total %	Votes	Votes %	+/−
Liberal Democrats	7	▲1	50.0	12	19	45.2	12,492	30.0	▲0.7
PIP	4	▲3	28.6	5	9	21.4	9,578	23.0	▲6.8
Labour	2	Steady	14.3	6	8	19.0	11,556	27.7	▲0.2
Conservative	1	▼4	7.1	3	4	9.5	6,745	16.2	▼3.4
Independent	0	Steady	0.0	2	2	4.8	0	0.0	▼2.1
Green	0	Steady	0.0	0	0	0.0	2,050	4.5	▼0.1
Reform	0	Steady	0.0	0	0	0.0	423	1.0	▲0.4
TUSC	0	Steady	0.0	0	0	0.0	197	0.5	▲0.4

== Ward results ==
Comparisons for the purpose of determining a gain, hold or loss of a seat, and for all percentage changes, is to the last time these specific seats were up for election in 2021. An asterisk indicates the incumbent councillor. The results for each ward were:

Incumbents are marked with an asterisk:*

=== Baffins ===
Baffins
Party	Candidate	Votes	%	±%
Liberal Democrats	Darren Sanders*	1,595	50.4	▲3.3
Conservative	Joseph Standen	539	17.0	▼11.9
Labour	Mark Andrew Farwell	503	15.9	▼1.6
PIP	Brannen Sime	310	9.8	N/A
Green	Bob Simmonds	173	5.5	▼1.2
TUSC	Rachel Rebecca Nolan	42	1.3	N/A
Majority		1056	33.4	▲15.2
Turnout		3162	28.4	▼4.7
Liberal Democrats hold		Swing		

=== Central Southsea ===
Central Southsea
Party	Candidate	Votes	%	±%
Labour	Charlotte Rachel Gerada*	1,780	48.7	▲6.4
Liberal Democrats	Felix Totolici	1298	35.5	▼3.7
Conservative	Alison Hoare	237	6.5	▼7.4
Green	Dillon Alexander Jarman	208	5.7	▲1.1
PIP	Paris-Jade Wilson	130	3.6	N/A
Majority		482	13.2	▲10.1
Turnout		3653	29.7	▼4.7
Labour hold		Swing		

=== Charles Dickens ===
Charles Dickens
Party	Candidate	Votes	%	±%
Labour	Raj Ghosh	907	45.0	▲0.6
Liberal Democrats	Renu Raj	368	18.3	▼4.8
Conservative	Thomas Gosling	319	15.8	▼11.7
PIP	Jaime Angela Custerson	240	11.9	N/A
Green	Miles Plested	109	5.4	N/A
TUSC	Chris Pickett	72	3.6	▼0.1
Majority		539	26.7	▲7.4
Turnout		2015	14.8	▼4.5
Labour hold		Swing		

=== Copnor ===
Copnor
Party	Candidate	Votes	%	±%
PIP	Lee Matthew Tindal	1,111	39.5	N/A
Conservative	Lewis Mark David Gosling*	740	26.3	▼26.9
Labour	Andy Butterworth	640	22.7	▼3.5
Liberal Democrats	James Howitt	190	6.7	▼3.3
Green	Tim Sheerman-Chase	135	4.8	▼5.8
Majority		371	13.2	
Turnout		2816	29.0	▼2.6
PIP gain from Conservative		Swing		

=== Cosham ===
Cosham
Party	Candidate	Votes	%	±%
PIP	Derek James North	1,149	37.8	N/A
Labour	Amanda Martin	1009	33.2	▼2.0
Conservative	Matthew Atkins*	641	21.1	▼26.2
Liberal Democrats	Julie Ann Spurgeon	118	3.9	▼5.7
Green	Josie McNally	100	3.3	N/A
TUSC	Nikki Doyle	20	0.7	N/A
Majority		140	4.6	
Turnout		3037	30.1	▼3.7
PIP gain from Conservative		Swing		

=== Drayton & Farlington ===
Drayton & Farlington
Party	Candidate	Votes	%	±%
Conservative	Spencer Roy Gardner	1,389	37.8	▼30.6
PIP	Benjamin Simon Portet	1267	34.5	N/A
Labour	Ian Martin Ayres	695	18.9	▼0.7
Liberal Democrats	Claire Udy	193	5.3	▲6.7
Green	Paul Bleachy	130	3.5	N/A
Majority		122	3.3	▼45.5
Turnout		3674	35.1	▼3.1
Conservative hold		Swing		

=== Eastney & Craneswater ===
Eastney & Craneswater
Party	Candidate	Votes	%	±%
Liberal Democrats	Nicholas Leigh Dorrington	1,156	31.1	▲1.6
Labour	Edward Batterbury	1017	27.4	▲1.4
PIP	Jack Smith	725	19.5	N/A
Conservative	Terry Henderson	604	16.3	▼21.5
Green	Tamara Liloutee Barbara Groen	214	5.8	▼0.8
Majority		139	3.7	
Turnout		3716	37.8	▼7.2
Liberal Democrats gain from Conservative		Swing		

=== Fratton ===
Fratton
Party	Candidate	Votes	%	±%
Liberal Democrats	Stuart William Brown*	824	31.7	▼3.5
PIP	Jacob Lee Short	729	27.9	N/A
Labour	Steph Richards	728	27.9	▼5.6
Conservative	Tim Edwards	208	8.0	▼16.4
Green	Samet Menguc Chering-Alves	111	4.3	▼1.0
Majority		95	3.8	▲1.7
Turnout		2600	24.6	▼3.0
Liberal Democrats hold		Swing		

=== Hilsea ===
Hilsea
Party	Candidate	Votes	%	±%
PIP	Matthew William Stringer Cordy	1,493	54.7	N/A
Conservative	Charles Douglas	533	19.5	▼38.7
Labour	Nicky Potts	461	16.9	▼9.0
Liberal Democrats	Peter John Williams	148	5.4	▼3.4
Green	Emma Louise Kimberley Murphy	95	3.5	▼3.7
Majority		960	35.2	
Turnout		2730	27.0	▼2.7
PIP gain from Conservative		Swing		

=== Milton ===
Milton
Party	Candidate	Votes	%	±%
Liberal Democrats	Kimberly Emma Barrett*	1,817	53.0	▲15.3
Labour	Arif Hasan Choudhury	949	27.7	▼4.3
Green	Sarah Louise Shilling Gilbert	231	6.7	▼0.6
Conservative	Stephen Alexander Gorys	220	6.4	▼16.7
Reform	Rachel Faith Zimmer	214	6.2	N/A
Majority		868	25.3	▲19.7
Turnout		3431	32.5	▼4.5
Liberal Democrats hold		Swing		

=== Nelson ===
Nelson
Party	Candidate	Votes	%	±%
Liberal Democrats	Richard James Adair	903	37.1	▼6.5
PIP	Gary Richard Fyles	687	28.2	▲20.4
Labour	Robin Stanley Head	505	20.7	▲1.0
Conservative	Erin May Hunt	223	9.2	▼21.8
Green	Duncan Stuart Robinson	99	4.1	▼1.7
TUSC	Nick Doyle	19	0.8	N/A
Majority		216	8.9	▼3.7
Turnout		2436	23.8	▼0.5
Liberal Democrats hold		Swing		

=== Paulsgrove ===
Paulsgrove
Party	Candidate	Votes	%	±%
PIP	George David Madgwick*	1,561	63.7	N/A
Conservative	Thomas Christopher Hoare	375	15.3	▼21.7
Labour	Patrick Charles Keefe	358	14.6	▲3.0
Green	Ian David McCulloch	84	3.4	N/A
Liberal Democrats	James Campbell	72	2.9	▲0.4
Majority		1186	48.4	
Turnout		2450	24.2	▲9.5
PIP gain from Independent		Swing		

=== St Jude ===
St Jude
Party	Candidate	Votes	%	±%
Liberal Democrats	Hugh Laurence Mason*	1,266	40.5	▲4.9
Labour	Joshua Anthony Allen	1,221	39.0	▲5.9
Conservative	Lee Kewell	282	9.0	▼14.5
Green	Harry Bernard Mallinder	184	5.9	▼1.9
PIP	John Malcolm Hill	176	5.6	N/A
Majority		45	1.4	▼1.2
Turnout		3129	33.6	▼5.0
Liberal Democrats hold		Swing		

=== St Thomas ===
St Thomas
Party	Candidate	Votes	%	±%
Liberal Democrats	Ian Holder*	1,199	42.1	▼0.3
Labour	Julian Thomas Lewis	783	27.5	▲4.9
Conservative	David Michael Chandler	435	15.3	▼12.7
Reform	Mark Zimmer	209	7.3	N/A
Green	Elliot Lee	177	6.2	▼0.8
TUSC	John Burrows	44	1.5	N/A
Majority		416	14.6	▲0.2
Turnout		2847	25.2	▼5.2
Liberal Democrats hold		Swing		

== By-elections ==
=== Paulsgrove ===
A by-election was called following the resignation on 10 September 2025 of Cllr Brian Madgwick on health grounds. There was no PIP candidate as previous.

Paulsgrove by-election: 23 October 2025
Party	Candidate	Votes	%	±%
Reform	Joe Standen	1,770	64.3	N/A
Conservative	Thomas Christopher Hoare	311	11.3	▼4.0
Labour	Sydna Phillips	289	10.5	▼4.1
Liberal Democrats	Michelle Jenny Simmons	239	8.7	▲5.8
Green	Georgina Ayling	143	5.2	▲1.8
Majority		1459	53.0	▲4.6
Turnout		2769	27.9	▲3.7
Reform gain from PIP		Swing		
