= 2027 Portsmouth City Council election =

2027 English local government election

- 6 May 2027

14 out of 42 seats to Portsmouth City Council 22 seats needed for a majority
Leader	Steve Pitt	Emily Strudwick	Charlotte Gerada
Party	Liberal Democrats	Reform	Labour
Leader's seat	Milton	Hilsea	Central Southsea
Last election	22 seats, 29.6%	12 seats, 32.6%	4 seats, 14.2%
Current seats	23	12	3
Leader	Simon Bosher
Party	Conservative	Independent
Leader's seat	Drayton & Farlington
Last election	3 seats, 10.4%	1 seat, 0.1%
Current seats	3	1
Incumbent Leader
Steve Pitt
Liberal Democrats

The 2027 Portsmouth City Council election will be held on 6 May 2027 to elect members of Portsmouth City Council in Hampshire, England. This will be on the same day as other local elections held across the United Kingdom.

== Background ==
=== Local government reorganisation ===
Due to proposed structural changes to local government in England, the 2026 election was intended to be the final election to the council before it was abolished and replaced by South East Hampshire Council, a new unitary authority.

However, on 7 September 2026, the government announced it was withdrawing plans for the planned restructuring pending review. Following this announcement, local elections due to be held in 2027 under the existing local electoral calendar would proceed.

== Summary ==
=== Election result ===
2027 Portsmouth City Council election
Party	This election				Full council			This election		
Party	Candidates	Seats	Net	Seats %	Other	Total	Total %	Votes	Votes %	+/−
Liberal Democrats					16					
Reform					9					
Labour					1					
Conservative					2					
Independent					0					

=== Incumbents ===
Ward	Incumbent councillor	Affiliation	Re-standing
Baffins	Leonie Oliver	Liberal Democrats	
Central Southsea	Suzy Horton	Liberal Democrats	
Charles Dickens	Cal Corkery	Independent	
Copnor	Raymond Dent	Reform	
Cosham	Mary Vallely	Labour	
Drayton & Farlington	Hannah Brent	Conservative	
Eastney & Cranswater	Peter Candlish	Liberal Democrats	
Fratton	Dave Ashmore	Liberal Democrats	
Hilsea	Emily Strudwick	Reform	
Milton	Gerald Vernon-Jackson	Liberal Democrats	
Nelson	Lee Hunt	Liberal Democrats	
Paulsgrove	Chris Dike	Reform	
St Jude	Graham Heaney	Labour	
St Thomas	Chris Attwell	Liberal Democrats	
