= Portsmouth Civic Offices =

Municipal building in Portsmouth, Hampshire, England

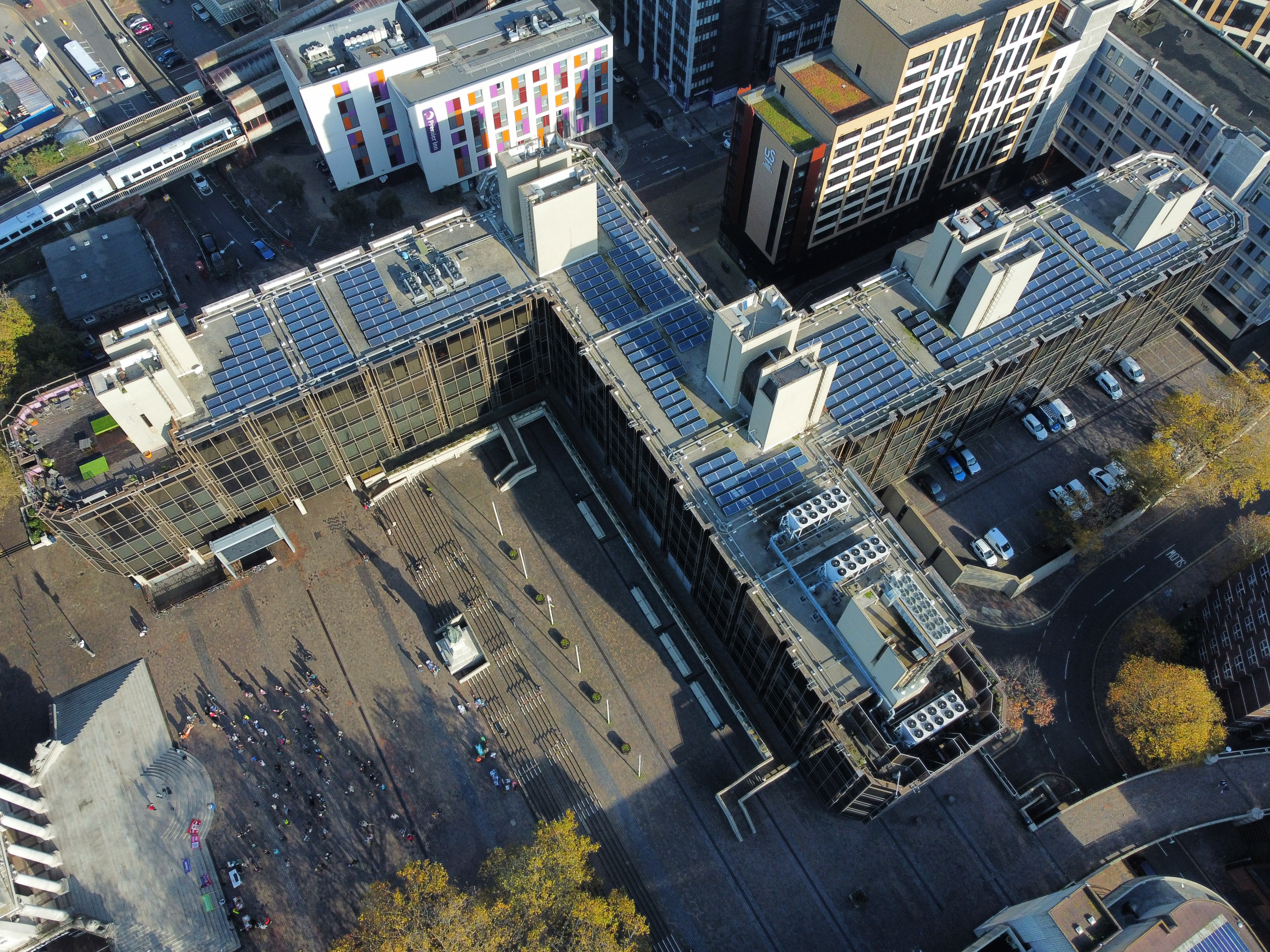
- The building in 2022

- Shown in Hampshire
- 50.7973°N 1.0913°W
- Location: Guildhall Square, Portsmouth

History
- Built: 1976

Site notes
- Architect(s): Harry Teggin and David Taylor
- Architectural style: International style

Portsmouth Civic Offices is a municipal building in Portsmouth, a city in Hampshire, in England. It is the administrative headquarters of Portsmouth City Council.

== History ==
During the Second World War, the area to the east of the Guildhall, including Russell Street and Sussex Street, was badly damaged by German bombing. After the war, several proposals to redevelop the area were considered but rejected by the council. In 1963, after a masterplan for the area was devised by Lionel Brett, the council decided that the surviving buildings should be demolished to create a 38 acres (15 ha) pedestrian area to be known as the Guildhall Square. It was envisaged that the guildhall would be on the west side of the square, new civic offices on the north and east sides and a new central library to the south. The new civic offices were intended to accommodate the increasing needs of council officers and their departments.

The foundation stone to mark the construction of the civic offices and the guildhall square was laid by the Lord Mayor of Portsmouth, Phyllis Loe, on 19 December 1972. An existing statue of Queen Victoria, which had been sculpted by Alfred Drury in bronze, placed on a granite pedestal and unveiled by Lady Dupree in 1903, was relocated to a new position in front of the proposed civic offices at that time. The new civic offices were designed by Harry Teggin and David Taylor in the International style, built in glass and steel, and were officially opened by Admiral of the Fleet Earl Mountbatten of Burma on 15 November 1976. Mountbatten also received the Freedom of the City of Portsmouth during his visit.

The design involved a six-storey building facing two sides of the Guildhall Square, with its glass walls designed to reflect the guildhall, and an additional wing stretching out behind. The building was approached by a flight of steps mirroring the steps to the guildhall on the opposite side of the square. Its design, which involved extensive use of black glass led to issues with solar gain and heat loss. The civic offices were used as the administrative headquarters of the council, with the council chamber in the guildhall remaining the venue for council meetings.

In July 2022, the council decided that the building was no longer-fit-for-purpose, because of its extensive use of black glass with no air conditioning to dissipate the heat, and because of the increased use of home-working. In March 2023, the council resolved to explore options to reduce the size of the complex, or to relocate to alternative premises: the options available were considered by the council in February 2024. In November 2024 Historic England issued a Certificate of Immunity from Listing, guaranteeing that the building would not be statutorily listed within the next five years.
