= 2026 Portsmouth City Council election =

Local election in Hampshire, England

- 7 May 2026

14 out of 42 seats to Portsmouth City Council 22 seats needed for a majority
- Registered: 149,572
- Turnout: 59,625; 39.9%
	Majority party	Minority party	Third party
Party	Liberal Democrats	Reform	Labour
Last election	19 seats, 30.0%	0 seats, 1.0%	8 seats, 27.7%
Seats before	18	10	9
Seats won	8	5	0
Seats after	22	12	4
Seat change	▲4	▲2	▼5
Popular vote	17,584	19,369	8,425
Percentage	29.6%	32.6%	14.2%
Swing	▼0.4%	▲31.6%	▼13.5%
	Fourth party	Fifth party	Sixth party
Party	Conservative	Independent	PIP
Last election	4 seats, 16.2%	2 seats, 0.0%	9 seats, 23.0%
Seats before	4	1	0
Seats won	1	0	0
Seats after	3	1	0
Seat change	▼1	Steady	Steady
Popular vote	6,205	34	Did not stand
Percentage	10.4%	0.1%	Did not stand
Swing	▼5.8%	N/A	▼23.0%
- Winner of each seat at the 2026 Portsmouth City Council election.
Leader before election
Steve Pitt
Liberal Democrats
No overall control (Note: Liberal Democrat minority)
Leader after election
Steve Pitt
Liberal Democrats

The 2026 Portsmouth City Council election was held on 7 May 2026, alongside the other local elections across the United Kingdom being held on the same day, to elect 14 of 42 members of Portsmouth City Council.

Prior to the election, the council was under no overall control. The Liberal Democrats were the largest party, and ran the council as a minority administration. They won enough extra seats at this election to give them an overall majority.

== Background ==
In 2024, the council remained under no overall control.

== Council composition ==
After 2024 election		Before 2026 election		After 2026 election	
Party	Seats	Party	Seats	Party	Seats
Liberal Democrats	19	Liberal Democrats	18	Liberal Democrats	22
Reform	0	Reform	10	Reform	12
Labour	8	Labour	9	Labour	4
Conservative	4	Conservative	4	Conservative	3
Independent	2	Independent	1	Independent	1
PIP	9	PIP	0	PIP	N/A

=== Changes before the elections ===
- September 2024: Raj Ghosh (Labour) suspended from party
- May 2025: Raj Ghosh (Independent) and Judith Smyth (Independent) (Note: Smyth was suspended in December 2022.) readmitted to Labour
- July 2025: Raymond Dent (Portsmouth Independent) and George Madgwick (Portsmouth Independent) join Reform
- September 2025: Brian Madgwick (Portsmouth Independent) resigns – by-election held October 2025
- October 2025:
  - Joe Standen (Reform) gains by-election from Portsmouth Independents
  - Matthew Cordy, Chris Dike, Derek North, and Russell Simpson join Reform from the Portsmouth Independent Party
- November 2025: Jason Fazackarley joins Reform from the Liberal Democrats
- Feb 2026 Cllr Leo Tindall and Emily Strudwick join Reform from the Portsmouth Independent Party

== Election result ==
2026 Portsmouth City Council election
Party	This election			Full council			This election		
Party	Seats	Net	Seats %	Other	Total	Total %	Votes	Votes %	+/−
Liberal Democrats	8	▲4	57.1	14	22	52.4	17,584	29.6	–0.4
Reform	5	▲2	35.7	7	12	28.6	19,369	32.6	+31.6
Labour	0	▼5	0.0	4	4	9.5	8,425	14.2	–13.5
Conservative	1	▼1	7.1	2	3	7.1	6,205	10.4	–5.8
Independent	0	Steady	0.0	1	1	2.4	34	0.1	N/A
Green	0	Steady	0.0	0	0	0.0	7,853	13.2	+8.7
Heritage	0	Steady	0.0	0	0	0.0	23	<0.1	N/A
PIP	0	Steady	0.0	0	0	0.0	N/A (Note: Did not stand candidates.)	N/A	–23.0

== Incumbents ==
Ward	Pre Election				Post Election	
Ward	Incumbent councillor	Party		Re-standing	Elected councillor	Party
Baffins	Abdul Kadir		Liberal Democrats	Yes	Abdul Kadir	Liberal Democrats
Central Southsea	George Fielding		Labour	Yes	Kate Dorrington	Liberal Democrats
Charles Dickens	Yinka Adeniran		Labour	Yes	Sam Coupland	Reform
Copnor	Benedict Swann		Conservative	Yes	Carl Inman	Reform
Cosham	Asghar Shah		Labour	Yes	Lamara Fudge	Reform
Drayton & Farlington	Simon Bosher		Conservative	Yes	Simon Bosher	Conservative
Eastney & Craneswater	Matthew Winnington		Liberal Democrats	Yes	Matthew Winnington	Liberal Democrats
Fratton	Tom Coles		Labour	Yes	Billy Ansell	Liberal Democrats
Hilsea	Russell Simpson	-	PIP / Reform (Note: Originally elected as Portsmouth Independent Party councillor, but defected to Reform in October 2025.)	Yes	Russell Simpson	Reform
Milton	Steve Pitt		Liberal Democrats	Yes	Steve Pitt	Liberal Democrats
Nelson	Jason Fazackarley	-	Liberal Democrats / Reform (Note: Originally elected as a Liberal Democrat, but defected to Reform in November 2025.)	Yes	Steve Andrews	Liberal Democrats
Paulsgrove	Joe Standen		Reform	Yes	Joe Standen (Note: Elected at the 2025 Paulsgrove by-election.)	Reform
St Jude	Judith Smyth		Labour	Yes	Denise Perry	Liberal Democrats
St Thomas	Mark Jeffery		Liberal Democrats	Yes	Mark Jeffery	Liberal Democrats

== Ward results ==
=== Baffins ===
Baffins
Party	Candidate	Votes	%	±%
Liberal Democrats	Abdul Kadir*	2,100	40.0	–10.4
Reform	Darren Searley	2,015	38.4	N/A
Green	David Simpson	468	8.9	+3.4
Labour	Jemma Artemis	342	6.5	–9.4
Conservative	Dave Da Silva	327	6.2	–10.8
Majority		85	1.6	–31.8
Turnout		5,252	47.2	+18.8
Registered electors		11,124		
Liberal Democrats hold				

=== Central Southsea ===
Central Southsea
Party	Candidate	Votes	%	±%
Liberal Democrats	Kate Dorrington	1,996	42.6	+7.1
Green	Lucy Bridgewater	978	20.9	+15.2
Labour	George Fielding*	856	18.3	–30.4
Reform	Addy Asaduzzaman	661	14.1	N/A
Conservative	Mackenzie Cumming	195	4.2	–2.3
Majority		1,018	21.7	N/A
Turnout		4,686	38.8	+9.1
Registered electors		12,078		
Liberal Democrats gain from Labour		Swing	▼4.1	

=== Charles Dickens ===
Charles Dickens
Party	Candidate	Votes	%	±%
Reform	Sam Coupland	993	30.0	N/A
Liberal Democrats	Harold McGregor-Sims	906	27.4	+9.1
Labour	Yinka Adeniran*	697	21.0	–24.0
Green	Elliott Lee	562	17.0	+11.6
Conservative	David Chandler	154	4.6	–11.2
Majority		87	2.6	N/A
Turnout		3,312	23.1	+8.3
Registered electors		14,308		
Reform gain from Labour				

=== Copnor ===
Copnor
Party	Candidate	Votes	%	±%
Reform	Carl Inman	1,616	38.4	N/A
Conservative	Ben Swann*	1,095	26.0	–0.3
Green	Tamara Groen	520	12.4	+7.6
Liberal Democrats	Paul Oakley-Cleife	500	11.9	+5.2
Labour	Andy Butterworth	478	11.4	–11.3
Majority		521	12.4	N/A
Turnout		4,209	43.5	+14.5
Registered electors		9,667		
Reform gain from Conservative				

=== Cosham ===
Cosham
Party	Candidate	Votes	%	±%
Reform	Lamara Fudge	1,881	42.5	N/A
Labour	Asghar Shah*	1,747	39.5	+6.3
Green	Alex Martins	425	9.6	+6.3
Liberal Democrats	Timothy Suffolk	374	8.4	+4.5
Majority		134	3.0	N/A
Turnout		4,427	43.8	+13.7
Registered electors		10,096		
Reform gain from Labour				

=== Drayton & Farlington ===
Drayton & Farlington
Party	Candidate	Votes	%	±%
Conservative	Simon Bosher*	1,841	35.8	–2.0
Reform	Stephen Burt	1,817	35.3	N/A
Labour	Matthew Holland	648	12.6	–6.3
Green	Quenton Kelley	422	8.2	+4.7
Liberal Democrats	Samantha Darragh	413	8.0	+2.7
Majority		24	0.5	–2.8
Turnout		5,141	49.5	+14.4
Registered electors		10,378		
Conservative hold				

=== Eastney & Craneswater ===
Eastney & Craneswater
Party	Candidate	Votes	%	±%
Liberal Democrats	Matthew Winnington*	1,900	40.6	+9.5
Reform	John Hill	1,117	23.9	N/A
Green	Lizzie Rose	619	13.2	+7.4
Conservative	Alison Hoare	551	11.8	–4.5
Labour	Patrick Keefe	472	10.1	–17.3
Heritage	Cliff Parsons	23	0.5	N/A
Majority		783	16.7	+13.0
Turnout		4,682	48.6	+10.8
Registered electors		9,643		
Liberal Democrats hold				

=== Fratton ===
Fratton
Party	Candidate	Votes	%	±%
Liberal Democrats	Billy Ansell	1,518	39.3	+7.6
Reform	Jacob Short	1,162	30.1	N/A
Green	Tim Sheerman-Chase	542	14.0	+9.7
Labour	Tom Coles*	454	11.8	–16.1
Conservative	Tim Edwards	186	4.8	–3.2
Majority		356	9.2	+5.4
Turnout		3,862	36.2	+11.6
Registered electors		10,681		
Liberal Democrats gain from Labour				

=== Hilsea ===
Hilsea
Party	Candidate	Votes	%	±%
Reform	Russell Simpson*	2,067	49.2	N/A
Green	Emma Murphy	574	13.7	+10.2
Labour	Edward Batterbury	562	13.4	–3.5
Liberal Democrats	Kristine Teivane	526	12.5	+7.1
Conservative	Matthew Atkins	470	11.2	–8.3
Majority		1,493	35.5	N/A
Turnout		4,199	41.7	+14.7
Registered electors		10,079		
Reform hold				

=== Milton ===
Milton
Party	Candidate	Votes	%	±%
Liberal Democrats	Steve Pitt*	2,233	45.7	–7.3
Reform	Phil Carpenter	1,273	26.0	+19.8
Green	Paula Savage	779	15.9	+9.2
Labour	David Trace	367	7.5	–20.2
Conservative	Melinda Koller	203	4.2	–2.2
Independent	Perry Barter	34	0.7	N/A
Majority		960	19.7	–5.6
Turnout		4,889	45.7	+13.2
Registered electors		10,704		
Liberal Democrats hold		Swing	▼13.6	

=== Nelson ===
Nelson
Party	Candidate	Votes	%	±%
Liberal Democrats	Steve Andrews	1,499	41.1	+4.0
Reform	Jason Fazackarley*	1,350	37.0	N/A
Green	Stan Marlow	347	9.5	+5.4
Labour	Robin Head	281	7.7	–13.0
Conservative	Lewis Gosling	168	4.6	–4.6
Majority		149	4.1	–4.8
Turnout		3,645	35.7	+11.9
Registered electors		10,207		
Liberal Democrats gain from Reform				

=== Paulsgrove ===
Paulsgrove
Party	Candidate	Votes	%	±%
Reform	Joe Standen*	1,963	57.5	N/A
Conservative	Thomas Hoare	467	13.7	–1.6
Labour	Mark Farwell	347	10.2	–4.4
Liberal Democrats	Michelle Simmons	319	9.4	+6.5
Green	Ian McCulloch	315	9.2	+5.8
Majority		1,496	43.8	N/A
Turnout		3,411	34.4	+10.2
Registered electors		9,926		
Reform hold				

=== St Jude ===
St Jude
Party	Candidate	Votes	%	±%
Liberal Democrats	Denise Perry	1,654	41.6	+1.1
Labour	Judith Smyth*	795	20.0	–19.0
Reform	Mitchell Newman	670	16.9	N/A
Green	Alvie Mahmud	636	16.0	+10.1
Conservative	Orsolya Pokoly	218	5.5	–3.5
Majority		859	21.6	+20.2
Turnout		3,973	42.9	+9.3
Registered electors		9,253		
Liberal Democrats gain from Labour		Swing	▲10.1	

=== St Thomas ===
St Thomas
Party	Candidate	Votes	%	±%
Liberal Democrats	Mark Jeffrey*	1,646	43.3	+1.2
Reform	Oskar Zabicki	784	20.6	+13.3
Green	Jay Mercer	666	17.5	+11.3
Labour	Tom Austin	379	10.0	–17.5
Conservative	Terry Henderson	330	8.7	–6.6
Majority		862	22.7	+8.1
Turnout		3,805	33.3	+8.1
Registered electors		11,428		
Liberal Democrats hold		Swing	▼6.1	
