= Portsmouth Guildhall =

Municipal building in Portsmouth, Hampshire, England

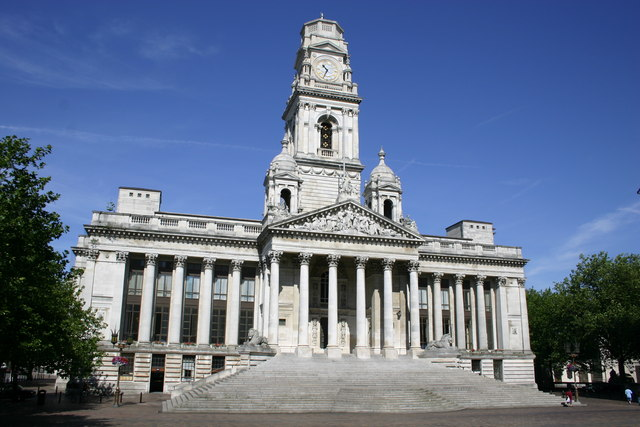

- Location within Hampshire
- 50.7979°N 1.0928°W
- Location: Portsmouth, Hampshire, England

History
- Built: 1890

Site notes
- Architect(s): William Hill (original design); Ernest Berry Webber (rebuild)
- Architectural style: Neo-classical style

Listed Building – Grade II
- Designated: 25 September 1972
- Reference no.: 1104316

Portsmouth Guildhall is a multi-use building in the centre of Portsmouth, Hampshire, England. It is located in a pedestrian square close to Portsmouth and Southsea railway station. Constructed in 1890, the building was known as Portsmouth Town Hall until 1926. It was heavily damaged by bombing during the Second World War and largely rebuilt during the 1950s by the English architect Ernest Berry Webber. It now operates as a concert, wedding and conference venue. It is a Grade II listed building.

== History ==
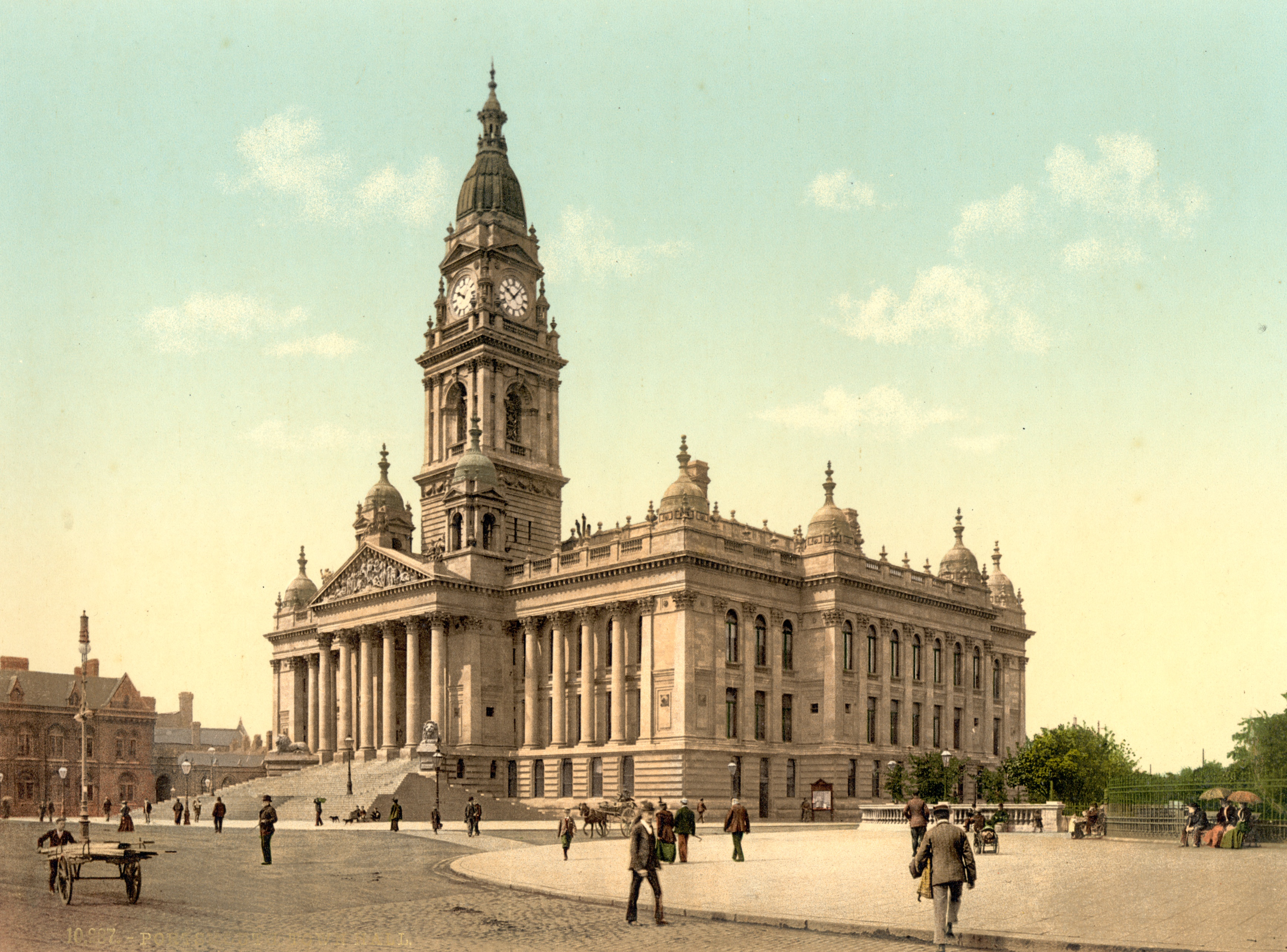
The Guildhall prior to World War Two

The current building was commissioned to replace an earlier town hall located in the High Street. The site selected for the new building had been occupied by the home of the Commanding Officer of Artillery. The foundation stone was laid by the mayor, Alfred Starling Blake, on 14 October 1886. The building, which was designed by William Hill in the Neo-classical style, was officially opened by the Prince and Princess of Wales on 9 August 1890.

The external design involved a main frontage with 17 bays separated by Corinthian order columns and a large portico with a pediment above. The pediment was designed by the sculptor, Henry Thomas Margetson, and was intended to depict "Britannia receiving the trades of the world". Above the crown of the pediment a statue of Neptune sitting a chariot pulled by three seahorses was installed. At roof level a three-tier bell tower with clocks on each face was erected. Internally, the principal rooms were the main concert hall, the council chamber and a room now known as the "star chamber": the latter room now displays a huge mural known as "Heaven's Light Our Guide" which depicts local scenes. The design is a slightly more elaborate version of his 1873-completed commission for Bolton Town Hall.

After Portsmouth was raised to the status of a city on 21 April 1926, the building which had previously been referred to as the "Town Hall" was renamed the "Guildhall".

On 10 January 1941, during the Second World War, it was hit by enemy incendiary bombs. The resultant fire gutted the building, completely destroying the interior and roof. Just the outer walls and tower remained standing, and those were fire-damaged.

The guildhall was entirely rebuilt at a cost of £1.5 million, over a four-year period, starting in 1955, to the designs of the architect, Ernest Berry Webber. The interior was altered from the original and the external style is missing much of its original detail, especially the dome above the clock and the finials atop the balustrades around the roof. It was reopened by Queen Elizabeth II, accompanied by the Duke of Edinburgh, on 8 June 1959. Meanwhile, the courts, which had met in the building before the war, moved to the new Law Courts on the east side of a small courtyard off Winston Churchill Avenue in July 1960.

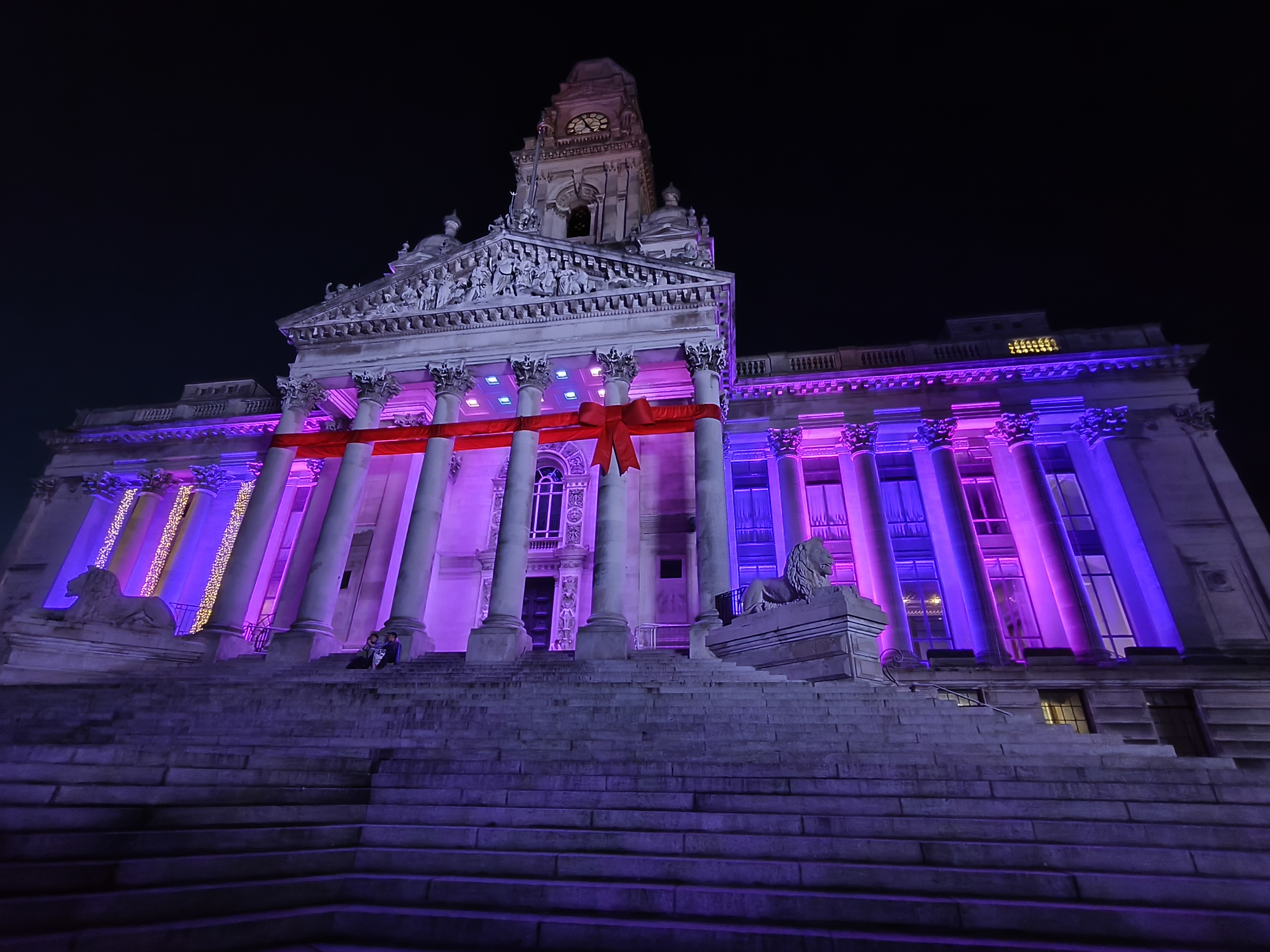
The Guildhall in the evening, December 2025

The council chamber in the guildhall was the home of the county borough of Portsmouth for much of the 20th century and continued to be the local seat of government after the enlarged Portsmouth City Council was formed in 1974. The Civic Offices, built to the east of the guildhall to accommodate the increasing needs of council officers and their departments, were completed in 1976.

== Bells and clock ==
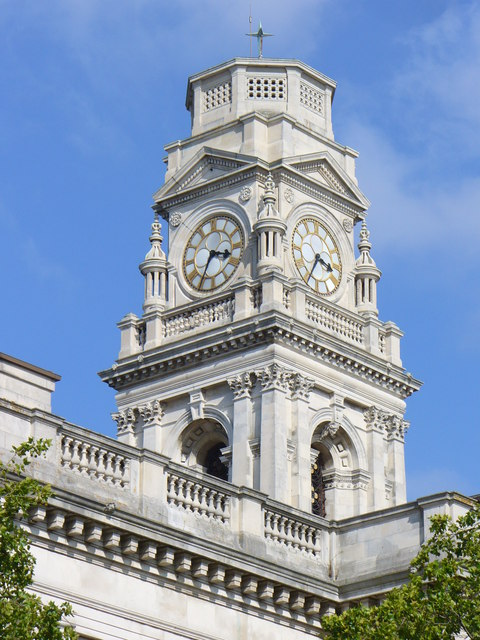
Detail of the clock tower

There are five bells in its bell tower, collectively nicknamed The Pompey Chimes, as they inspired the football chant of the same name. Weighing around 4 tons, the largest of the five bells, Victoria is named after Queen Victoria and is inscribed with her name, and chimes on the hour. The four quarter bells chime at 15, 30 and 45 minutes past the hour and play the Westminster Quarters, just before Victoria tolls on the hour. The bells were cast by Mears & Stainbank in 1889.

The clock in the tower was made by J. W. Benson of Ludgate, who claimed it to be 'the largest and most powerful clock in the South of England'.

The Pompey Chimes fell silent in 2003 when the bell tower was found to be in need of restoration from the corrosive nature of sea salt in the Portsmouth air. The work was carried out by Smith of Derby Group, the restoration project finishing in time for Queen Elizabeth's visit to Portsmouth in 2009 to mark the 65th anniversary of the D-Day landings.

The four quarter bells were to have been officially named Nelson, Victory, John Pounds and Harry Redknapp in a 2008 public poll by Portsmouth City Council in 2008. The official naming was stalled due to the high popularity of internet votes for Harry Redknapp's name from unregistered anonymous voters. Redknapp, the former Portsmouth Football Club manager had suddenly departed the club for Tottenham Hotspur F.C. shortly before bell name voting commenced, which had left a wide range of emotions among many Portsmouth Football Club fans and city residents. Foul play, possibly from rival football supporters was suspected by Portsmouth City Council, who had organised the vote, and the four quarter bells have remained unnamed.

== Current use ==
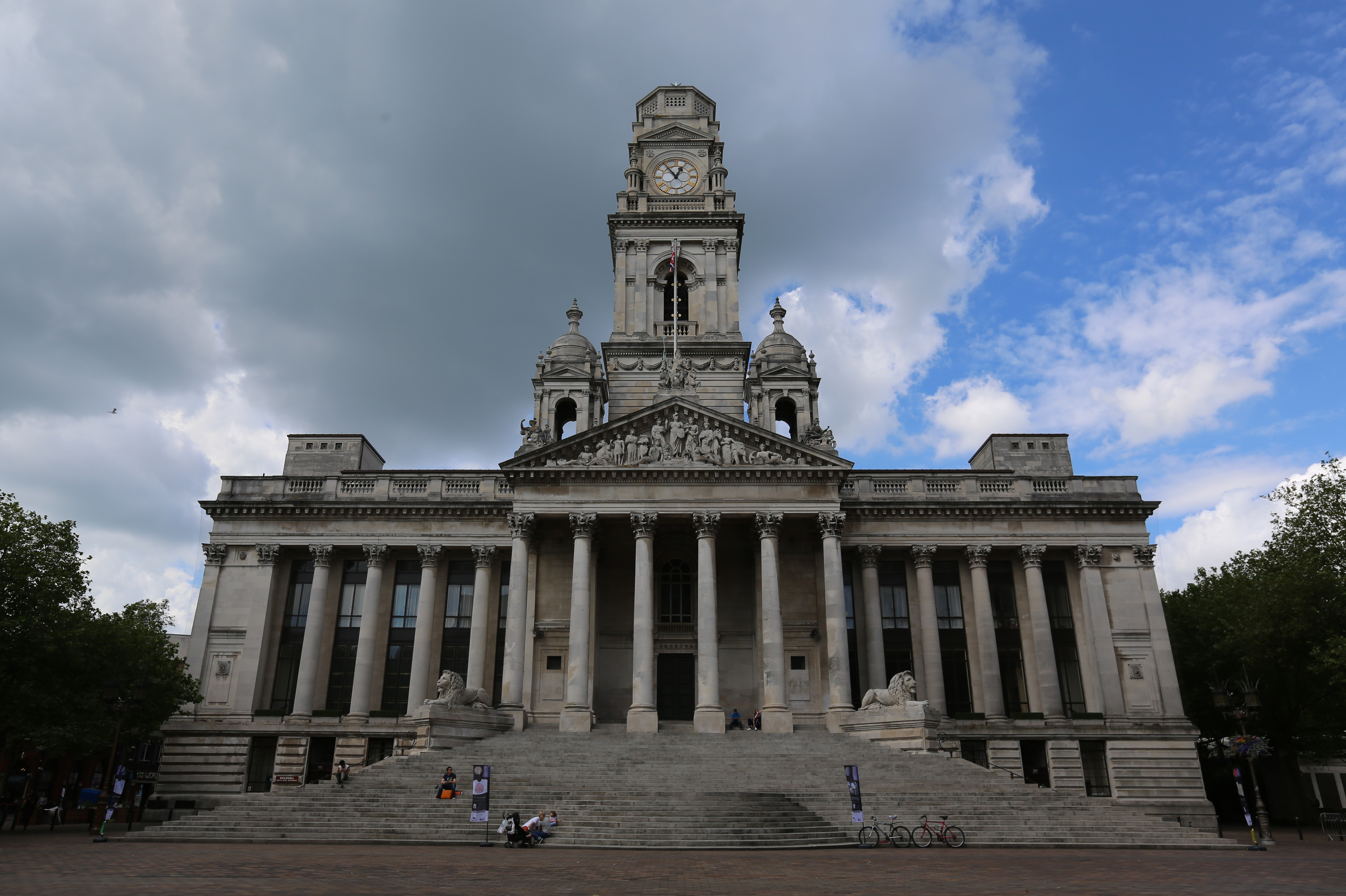
Portsmouth Guildhall seen in 2014

The Guildhall now operates as a concert, wedding and conference venue. It has been managed by the Guildhall Trust (formerly the Portsmouth Cultural Trust), a registered charity, since 2011. The main hall has a standing capacity of up to 2,500 for concerts. Leading performers have included Debbie Harry in November 2003.

The Guildhall is the focal point of Guildhall Square, a pedestrian square laid out in the 1970s. Other significant structures around the square include a statue of Queen Victoria, the university buildings, the city war memorial, and Victoria Park.

== See also ==
- Guild
- Guildhall
