= 2021 Portsmouth City Council election =

2021 UK local government election

← 2019	6 May 2021	2022 →

14 of the 42 seats to Portsmouth City Council 22 seats needed for a majority
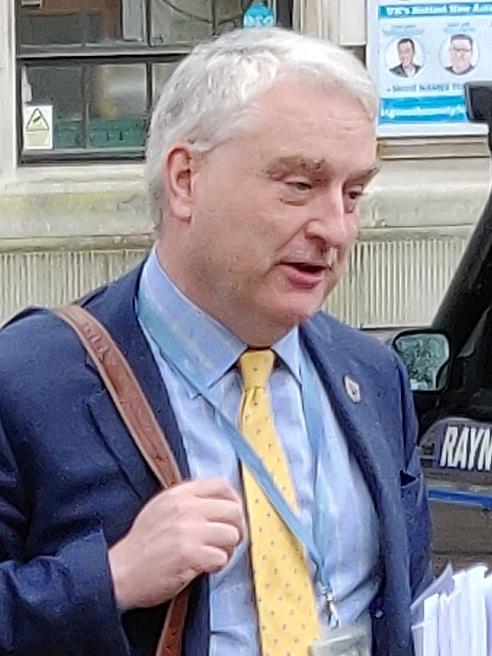
	First party	Second party	Third party
	Con		Lab
Leader	Donna Jones (outgoing)	Gerald Vernon-Jackson	George Fielding
Party	Conservative	Liberal Democrats	Labour
Leader's seat	Hilsea (retiring)	Milton	Central Southsea
Seats before	15	17	6
Seats won	5	6	2
Seats after	16	15	7
Seat change	▲1	▼2	▲1
Popular vote	17,230	12,713	13,392
Percentage	36.0%	26.6%	28.0%
Swing	▲12.1%	▼2.6%	▲2.9%
- Map showing the results of the 2021 Portsmouth City Council election
Council control before election
No Overall Control (Lib Dem minority)
Council control after election
No Overall Control (Lib Dem minority)

Elections to Portsmouth City Council took place on Thursday 6 May 2021, alongside other local elections across the country.

The seats contested in this election were last contested in 2016. The election was originally due to take place on 7 May 2020, but was postponed due to the COVID-19 pandemic. One seat from each ward was up for election.

== Background ==
Elections to Portsmouth council since 2012 have proven to have volatile and changing results, with eleven of the city’s fourteen wards voting for different parties each year. Following the 2018 election in Portsmouth, Gerald Vernon-Jackson became leader of the council and has led the council in a minority administration.

== Changes between 2019 and 2021 ==
Immediately after the previous elections, in May 2019, the composition of the council was:

- Liberal Democrats: 18
- Labour Party: 6
- Conservative Party: 16
- Independent: 2

In July 2019, a Liberal Democrat councillor, Jeanette Smith, who was elected in 2018 quit the party. She had been a member of the Lib Dems for two years, having previously been a member of the Labour Party.

In September 2019, Jeanette Smith and one of the other independent councillors, Claire Udy, who had run for election as a member of the Labour Party but had quit shortly before the election, after nominations were closed, citing a lack of support from the local party while under investigation by the National Executive Committee, formed a new grouping called the Progressive Portsmouth People group.

In April 2020, Conservative councillor Lee Mason was suspended from the party, after baking a hot cross bun that appeared to have a swastika "emblazoned" on it over Easter. He was reinstated in August 2020.

In June 2020, Conservative councillor Linda Symes was suspended from the party, after appearing to question why there were demonstrations over the murder of George Floyd during the Black Lives Matter protests and yet not over the murder of Lee Rigby or the killing of seven-year-old Emily Jones. Although she insisted she was 'not being racist' and that 'every life matters’. In another post on Facebook, Symes shared a comment about the mayor of London which said: "Because of his ethnicity Khan (Sadiq) will remain Mayor."

As of October 2020, the composition of the council was as follows:

- Liberal Democrats: 17
- Labour Party: 6
- Conservative Party: 15
- Portsmouth Progressive People Group: 2
- Independent: 2

== Results summary ==
2021 Portsmouth City Council election
Party	This election			Full council			This election		
Party	Seats	Net	Seats %	Other	Total	Total %	Votes	Votes %	+/−
Conservative	5	▲1	35.7	11	16	38.1	17,230	36.0	+11.1
Liberal Democrats	6	▼2	42.9	9	15	35.7	12,713	26.6	-2.6
Labour	2	Steady	14.3	5	7	16.7	13,392	28.0	+2.9
Independent	1	▲1	7.1	3	4	9.5	1,787	3.7	N/A
Green	0	Steady	0.0	0	0	0.0	2,371	5.0	-0.8
TUSC	0	Steady	0.0	0	0	0.0	191	0.4	New
NHA	0	Steady	0.0	0	0	0.0	100	0.2	-0.5
Workers Party	0	Steady	0.0	0	0	0.0	49	0.1	New

== Ward results ==
Comparisons for the purpose of determining a gain, hold or loss of a seat, and for all percentage changes, is to the last time these specific seats were up for election in 2016. An asterisk indicates the incumbent councillor.

=== Baffins ===
Baffins
Party	Candidate	Votes	%	±%
Liberal Democrats	Darren Sanders*	1,737	47.1	−0.4
Conservative	Tom Collins	1,066	28.9	+10.2
Labour	Jason Christopher	640	17.4	+1.7
Green	Bob Simmonds	246	6.7	N/A
Majority		671	18.19	
Turnout		3,689	33.1	
Liberal Democrats hold		Swing		

=== Central Southsea ===
Central Southsea
Party	Candidate	Votes	%	±%
Labour	Charlotte Gerada	1,740	42.3	+18.2
Liberal Democrats	Steve Pitt*	1,611	39.2	−1.7
Conservative	Charles Douglas	570	13.9	+1.9
Green	Tamara Groen	191	4.6	−8.7
Majority		129	3.14	
Turnout		4,112	34.4	
Labour gain from Liberal Democrats		Swing		

=== Charles Dickens ===
Charles Dickens
Party	Candidate	Votes	%	±%
Labour	Kirsty Mellor	1,183	45.6	+11.7
Conservative	Renu Raj	713	27.5	+17.2
Liberal Democrats	Yahiya Chowdhury	600	23.1	−8.6
TUSC	Chris Pickett	97	3.7	N/A
Majority		470	18.13	
Turnout		2,593	19.3	
Labour hold		Swing		

=== Copnor ===
Copnor
Party	Candidate	Votes	%	±%
Conservative	Lewis Gosling	1,636	53.2	+17.3
Labour	Mary Vallely	805	26.2	−2.8
Green	Tim Sheerman-Chase	326	10.6	N/A
Liberal Democrats	Bobby Tera	307	10.0	+0.4
Majority		831	27.0	
Turnout		3,074	31.6	
Conservative hold		Swing		

=== Cosham ===
Cosham
Party	Candidate	Votes	%	±%
Conservative	Matt Atkins*	1,668	48.3	+7.1
Labour	Asghar Shah	1,252	35.2	+6.3
Liberal Democrats	David Fuller	333	9.6	+0.9
Independent	Mike Jerome	103	3.0	N/A
NHA	Veronika Wagner	100	2.9	N/A
Majority		416	13.04	
Turnout		3,456	33.78	
Conservative hold		Swing		

=== Drayton and Farlington ===
Drayton and Farlington
Party	Candidate	Votes	%	±%
Conservative	Ryan Brent	2,707	68.4	+13.4
Labour	David Simpson	776	19.6	−0.8
Liberal Democrats	Duncan Garland	475	12.0	+2.8
Majority		1,931	48.8	
Turnout		3,958	38.2	
Conservative hold		Swing		

=== Eastney and Craneswater ===
Eastney and Craneswater
Party	Candidate	Votes	%	±%
Conservative	John Smith	1,654	37.8	+3.2
Liberal Democrats	Matthew Winnington*	1,292	29.5	−13.8
Labour	Craig Withey	1,139	26.0	+12.4
Green	Menno Groen	289	6.6	−1.9
Majority		362	8.3	
Turnout		4,374	45.0	
Conservative gain from Liberal Democrats		Swing	+8.5	

=== Fratton ===
Fratton
Party	Candidate	Votes	%	±%
Liberal Democrats	Stuart Brown	1,029	35.2	+3.2
Labour	Nikki Coles	977	33.5	+6.3
Conservative	Paul Sweeney	712	24.4	+11.2
Green	Ken Hawkins	154	5.3	−0.6
Workers Party	Joey Smith	49	1.7	N/A
Majority		52	1.78	
Turnout		2,921	27.6	
Liberal Democrats hold		Swing		

=== Hilsea ===
Hilsea
Party	Candidate	Votes	%	±%
Conservative	Daniel Wemyss	1,763	58.2	+3.6
Labour	Julian Lewis	783	25.9	−6.2
Liberal Democrats	Peter Williams	265	8.8	−4.4
Green	Emma Murphy	217	7.2	N/A
Majority		980	32.36	
Turnout		3,028	29.7	
Conservative hold		Swing		

=== Milton ===
Milton
Party	Candidate	Votes	%	±%
Liberal Democrats	Kimberly Barrett	1,471	37.7	−4.9
Labour	Paula Savage	1,251	32.0	+14.4
Conservative	Jack Smith	901	23.1	+7.0
Green	Sarah Gilbert	283	7.3	−0.4
Majority		220	5.63	
Turnout		3,906	37.0	
Liberal Democrats hold		Swing		

=== Nelson ===
Nelson
Party	Candidate	Votes	%	±%
Liberal Democrats	Leo Madden*	1,097	43.6	+3.2
Conservative	David Cairns	781	31.0	+15.2
Labour	Georgia Hancock	495	19.7	−2.6
Green	Duncan Robinson	145	5.8	N/A
Majority		316	12.55	
Turnout		2,518	24.3	
Liberal Democrats hold		Swing		

=== Paulsgrove ===
Paulsgrove
Party	Candidate	Votes	%	±%
Independent	George Madgwick	1,684	49.1	N/A
Conservative	Tony Hewitt	1,269	37.0	+13.1
Labour	Mark Farwell	397	11.6	−29.7
Liberal Democrats	George Brown	81	2.4	−1.7
Majority		415	12.10	
Turnout		3,431	33.7	
Independent gain from Labour		Swing		

=== St Jude ===
St Jude
Party	Candidate	Votes	%	±%
Liberal Democrats	Hugh Mason*	1,287	35.6	−4.1
Labour	Raj Ghosh	1,194	33.1	+16.3
Conservative	Stephen Gorys	847	23.5	−3.6
Green	Ian McCulloch	283	7.8	0.0
Majority		93	2.58	
Turnout		3,611	38.6	
Liberal Democrats hold		Swing		

=== St Thomas ===
St Thomas
Party	Candidate	Votes	%	±%
Liberal Democrats	Ian Holder	1,428	42.4	+8.2
Conservative	Alicia Denney	943	28.0	+4.7
Labour	Rebecca Ozaniec	760	22.6	−0.9
Green	Elliott Lee	237	7.0	−0.7
Majority		485	14.40	
Turnout		3,368	30.4	
Liberal Democrats hold		Swing		
