= Portsmouth City Council =

Local authority of the city of Portsmouth in Hampshire, England

Type
- Type: Unitary authority

Leadership
- Lord Mayor: Abdul Kadir, Liberal Democrat since 19 May 2026
- Leader: Steve Pitt, Liberal Democrat since 16 May 2023
- Chief Executive: Natalie Brahma-Pearl since 2023

Structure
- Seats: 42 councillors
- Graph of the party split among 42 seats.
- Political groups: Administration (23) Liberal Democrats (23) Other parties (19) Reform (12) Conservative (3) Labour (3) Independent (1)
- Length of term: 4 years

Elections
- Voting system: First-past-the-post
- Last election: 7 May 2026
- Next election: 6 May 2027

Motto
- Heaven's Light Our Guide

Meeting place
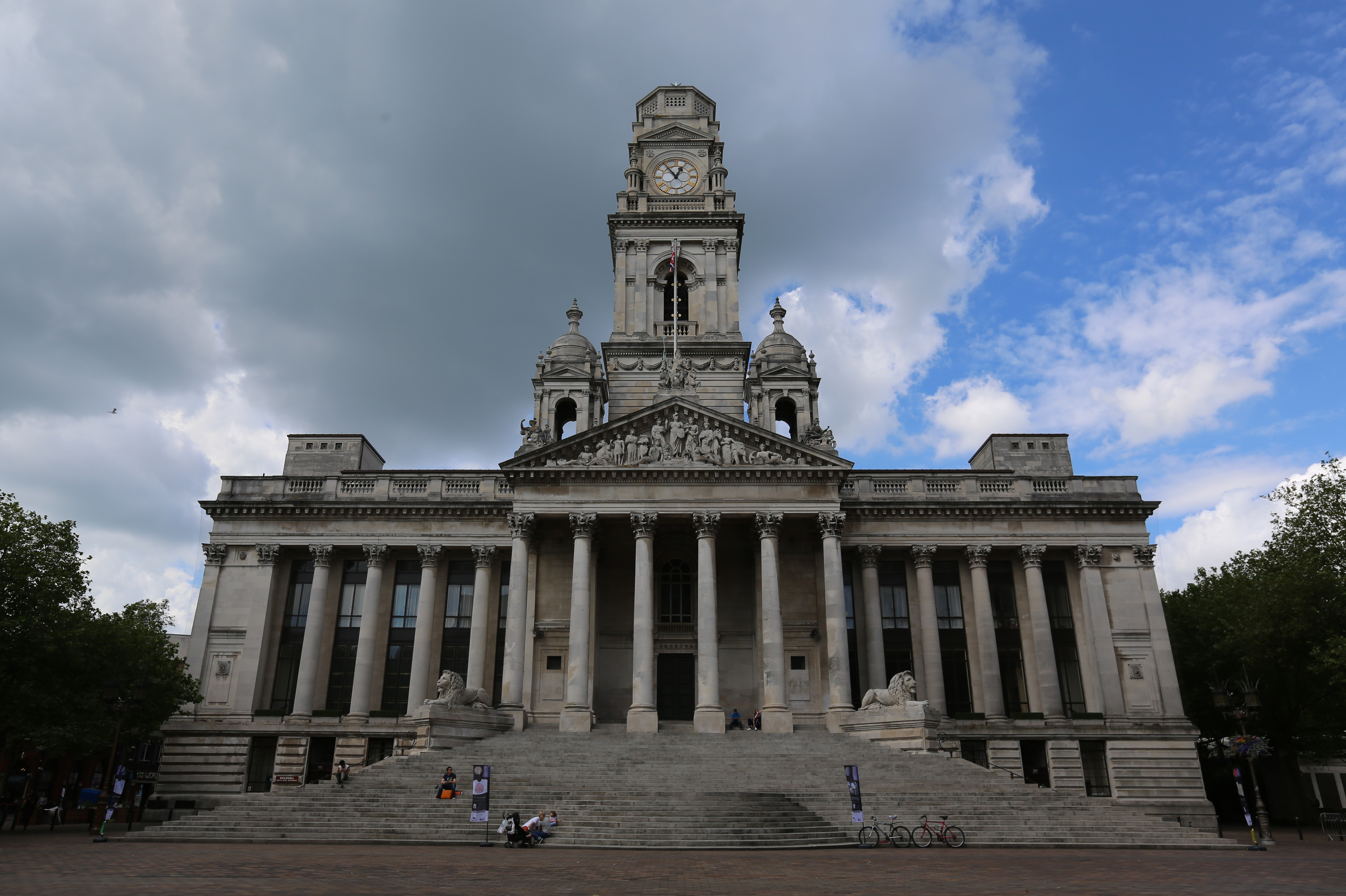
- Guildhall, Guildhall Square, Portsmouth, PO1 2AJ

Website
- portsmouth.gov.uk

Portsmouth City Council is the local authority of the city of Portsmouth, in the ceremonial county of Hampshire, England. Portsmouth has had a council since medieval times, which has been reformed on numerous occasions. Since 1997 the council has been a unitary authority, being a district council which also performs the functions of a county council; it is independent from Hampshire County Council.

The council has been under Liberal Democrat majority control since 2026. The council meets at the Guildhall and has its main offices in the adjoining Civic Offices.

In 2026, the council became a member of the Hampshire and the Solent Combined County Authority.

== History ==
Portsmouth was an ancient borough. Its earliest known charter was issued in 1194, although some sources suggest that replaced an earlier charter of 1106 which has since been lost. It was reformed in 1836 to become a municipal borough under the Municipal Corporations Act 1835, which standardised how most boroughs operated across the country. It was then governed by a body formally called the 'mayor, aldermen and burgesses of the borough of Portsmouth', generally known as Portsmouth Corporation, the town council or the borough council.

When elected county councils were established in 1889, Portsmouth was considered large enough for the existing borough council to also take on county council functions. It was therefore made a county borough, independent from the new Hampshire County Council. The borough boundaries were enlarged on several occasions.

Portsmouth was granted city status on 21 April 1926, after which the corporation was also known as the city council. In 1928 the city was given the right to appoint a lord mayor.

Portsmouth was reconstituted as a non-metropolitan district in 1974 under the Local Government Act 1972. It kept the same boundaries, which had last been expanded in 1932, but the council became a lower-tier district council, with Hampshire County Council providing county-level services in the city for the first time. Portsmouth's borough and city statuses and its lord mayoralty were transferred to the reformed district and its council.

Portsmouth regained its independence from Hampshire County Council on 1 April 1997. The way this change was implemented was to create a new non-metropolitan county of Portsmouth covering the same area as the existing district, but with no separate county council; instead the existing city council took on county council functions, making it a unitary authority. This therefore restored the city council to the powers it had held when Portsmouth had been a county borough prior to 1974. The city remains part of the ceremonial county of Hampshire for the purposes of lieutenancy.

In 2026, the council became a member of the Hampshire and the Solent Combined County Authority.

In March 2026, the government announced local government reorganisation plans, which would have seen the existing city council abolished in 2028 and local government across Hampshire reorganised into four unitary authorities. These proposals were withdrawn in September 2026.

== Powers and functions ==
The local authority derives its powers and functions from the Local Government Act 1972 and subsequent legislation. For the purposes of local government, Portsmouth is within a non-metropolitan area of England. As a unitary authority, Portsmouth City Council has the powers and functions of both a non-metropolitan county and a district council combined. In its capacity as a district council, it is a billing authority, collecting council tax and business rates; processing local planning applications; and it is responsible for housing, waste collection, Trading Standards, and environmental health. It functions as a Port Health Authority for its surrounding waters. In its capacity as a county council, it is a local education authority, responsible for social services, libraries, and waste disposal.

The council adopted a pledge in 2022, which it called the "Portsmouth Pledge", whereby it set out a number of commitments to look after children in its care.

== Political control ==
The council has been under Liberal Democrat majority control since the 2026 election.

Political control of the council since the 1974 reforms has been as follows:

Lower tier non-metropolitan district

Party in control	Years
Conservative	1974–1991
No overall control	1991–1996
Labour	1996–1997

Unitary authority

Party in control	Years
Labour	1997–2000
No overall control	2000–2009
Liberal Democrats	2009–2014
No overall control	2014–2026
Liberal Democrats	2026–present

=== Leadership ===
The role of Lord Mayor of Portsmouth is largely ceremonial. Political leadership is instead provided by the leader of the council. The leaders since 1994 have been:

Councillor	Party	From	To
Leo Madden	Labour	1994	2000
Ian Gibson	Conservative	16 May 2000	May 2001
Leo Madden	Labour	15 May 2001	May 2002
Frank Worley	Conservative	14 May 2002	2003
Phil Shaddock	Liberal Democrats	2003	Jun 2004
Gerald Vernon-Jackson	Liberal Democrats	22 Jun 2004	Jun 2014
Donna Jones	Conservative	3 Jun 2014	15 May 2018
Gerald Vernon-Jackson	Liberal Democrats	15 May 2018	May 2023
Steve Pitt	Liberal Democrats	16 May 2023	

=== Composition ===
Following the 2026 election and subequent changes to July 2026, the composition of the council was:

Portsmouth City Council composition after 2026 local elections

Party	Seats
Liberal Democrats	23
Reform	12
Conservative	3
Labour	3
Independent	1
Total	42

== Elections ==
Since the last boundary changes in 2002, the council has comprised 42 councillors representing 14 wards, with each ward electing three councillors. Elections are held three years out of every four, with a third of the council (one councillor for each ward) elected each time for a four-year term of office.

== Premises ==
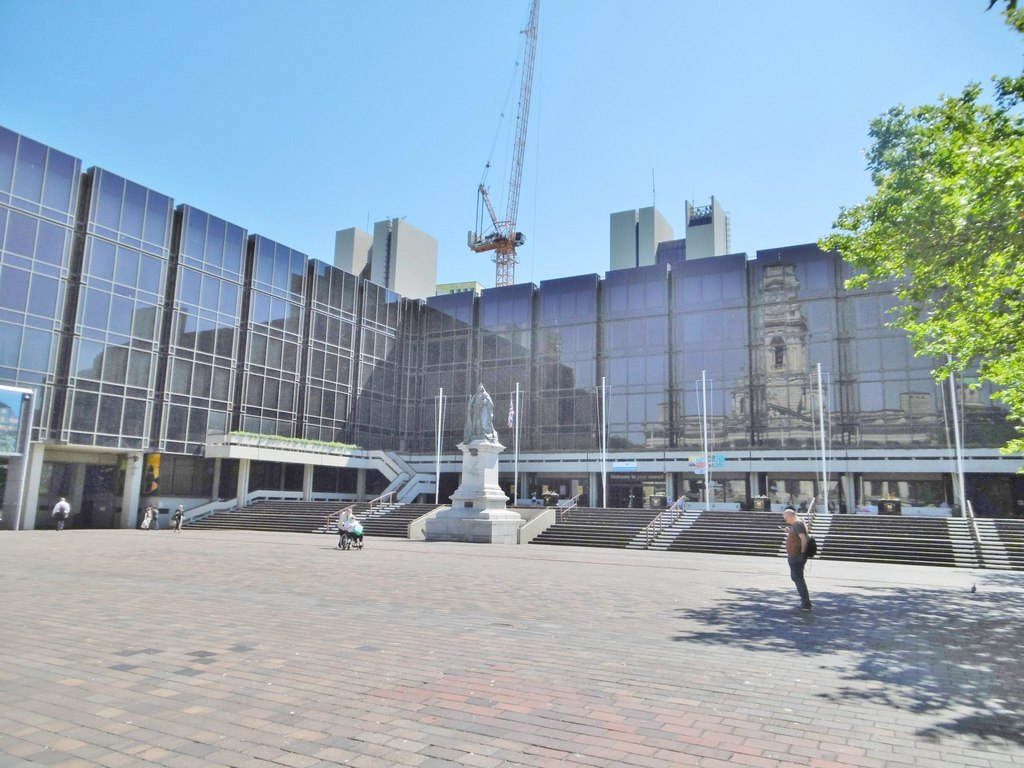
Civic Offices, Guildhall Square, Portsmouth, PO1 2AL: Council's main offices

The council meets at Portsmouth Guildhall, in Guildhall Square. The building was completed in 1890 for the old borough council. The council's main offices are the Civic Offices, which were erected to the east of the guildhall and completed in 1976.
