= Arthur Segal =

Arthur Segal may refer to:

- Arthur Segal (painter) (1875–1944), Romanian abstract artist
- Arthur Segal (archaeologist) (born 1946), Polish-born Israeli archaeologist
