= 1 Fulford Street =

House in London, England

Coordinates: 51°30′03″N 0°03′30″W

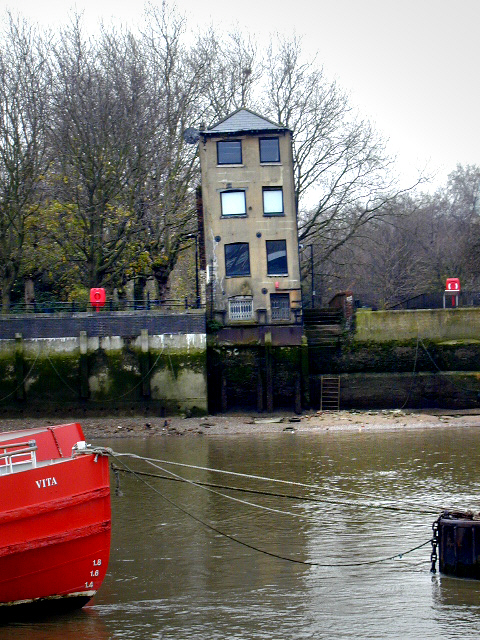
North elevation viewed from the Thames in 2008

1 Fulford Street (known informally as the "Leaning Tower of Rotherhithe" and formerly 41 Rotherhithe Street) is a house in Rotherhithe, South London. A narrow, four-storey property, it now stands isolated in King's Stairs Gardens and is the only building on its street. It was originally enclosed by riverside warehouses and tenements. In the 1930s it was owned by the writers Arthur Calder-Marshall and Roger Roughton, the latter renting out the top floor to Jessica Mitford and Esmond Romilly for two years. The property survived the Blitz, which destroyed its neighbours to the west, to become an office for the firm of Braithwaite & Dean. In the 1960s London County Council was unsuccessful in purchasing the property but cleared most of those nearby to form the Gardens which connect the river to Southwark Park.

== Description ==
1 Fulford Street is located in Rotherhithe, South London. It is the only building on the street and lies at its northernmost end, adjacent to the south bank of the River Thames from which it has views to Tower Bridge and Canary Wharf. 1 Fulford Street is four storeys tall and 3.5 metres (11 ft) wide and the exterior is painted white. The building has been nicknamed the "Leaning Tower of Rotherhithe". Immediately west of the property, the King's Stairs lead down to the river.

The occupiable space measures 2,131 square feet (198.0 m^{2}) and, as of 2023, it was configured into two separate dwellings totalling two kitchens, two bathrooms, two bedrooms, two open-plan living spaces and three reception rooms. The house was previously numbered as 41 Rotherhithe Street but that road now terminates to the east of the site.

== History ==
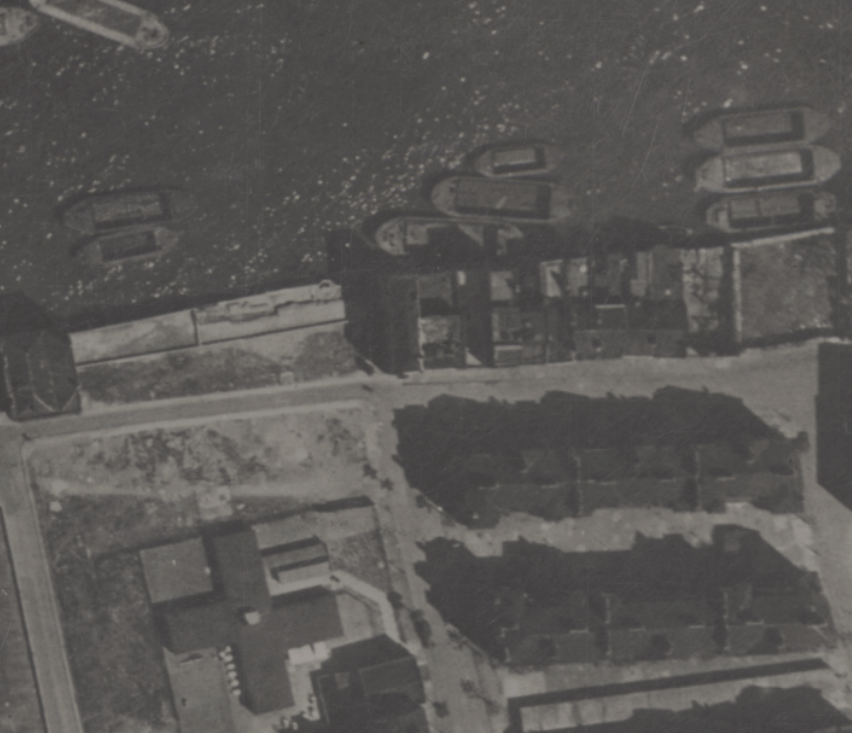
The building (centre) on 1947 aerial photography. Bombsite to the west (left), Lombard Street to the south and Rotherhithe Street, now closed, running east-west.

The house was formerly sandwiched between two warehouses located near to a number of slums and docks. By the 1930s the house was owned by writer Arthur Calder-Marshall. When he moved to Hollywood in June 1937, Calder-Marshall passed ownership to fellow author Roger Roughton. Roughton occupied the second and third storeys of the property and rented the top floor to Jessica Mitford and her husband Esmond Romilly for £2 a month. They intended to use the property to host games of twenty-one, with a view to profiting from gambling and remained tenants until 1939. Together with some neighbouring properties it became the centre of a Bohemian scene; visitors to 41 Rotherhithe Street are reported to have included Marlene Dietrich, Noël Coward and John Betjeman.

During the Second World War German bombing during the Blitz destroyed the riverside properties to the west of 41 Rotherhithe Street. Although the properties to the east were wood-built tenements they survived the war. The photographer Antony Armstrong-Jones is reported to have lived at 41 Rotherhithe Street and to have first met Princess Margaret, whom he married in 1960, in the building. By the 1960s the building belonged to Braithwaite & Dean, a firm of barge builders and freight handlers. It was used as a wages office for their lightermen, who would pull their barges up alongside to collect their payments.

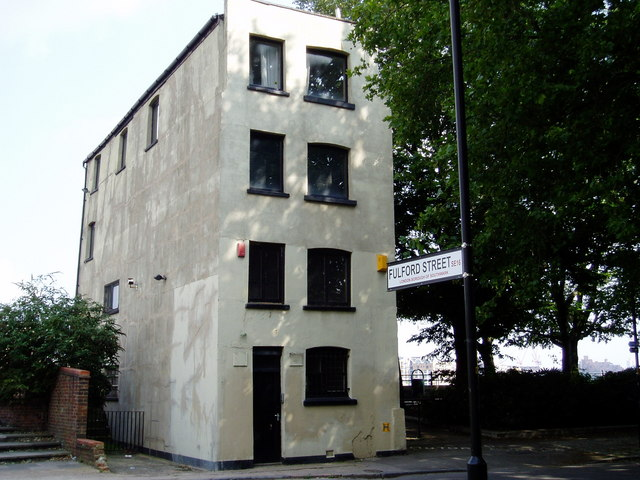
South and west elevations viewed from Fulford Street in 2007

From the mid-1960s London County Council was buying up properties in the area as part of a scheme to establish King's Stairs Gardens to connect Southwark Park to the river. The council asked Braithwaite & Dean to sell them 41 Rotherhithe Street but the company refused their offer. By 1979 the council had largely completed the new park, with buildings on Mayflower Street, Clark's Orchard, Fulford Street and Seven Step Alley all being demolished. Paradise Street east of Cathay Street was also cleared except for St Peter & the Guardian Angels Roman Catholic church which, like 41 Rotherhithe Street, now stands isolated amidst the gardens. The A200 road (Jamaica Road) was also subject to partial clearance and was widened on the approach to Rotherhithe Tunnel.

In 1995 the property, now known as 1 Fulford Street, was purchased and used as a home. Initially occupying the whole house, the owners later split it into two residences, renting out the top two floors and using the lower storeys as their own living and work space. In March 2023 the property was sold at auction by Savills to a local buying for £1.5 million.
