= Rotherhithe Street =

Road in the London Borough of Southwark

Coordinates: 51.50688°N 0.03878°W

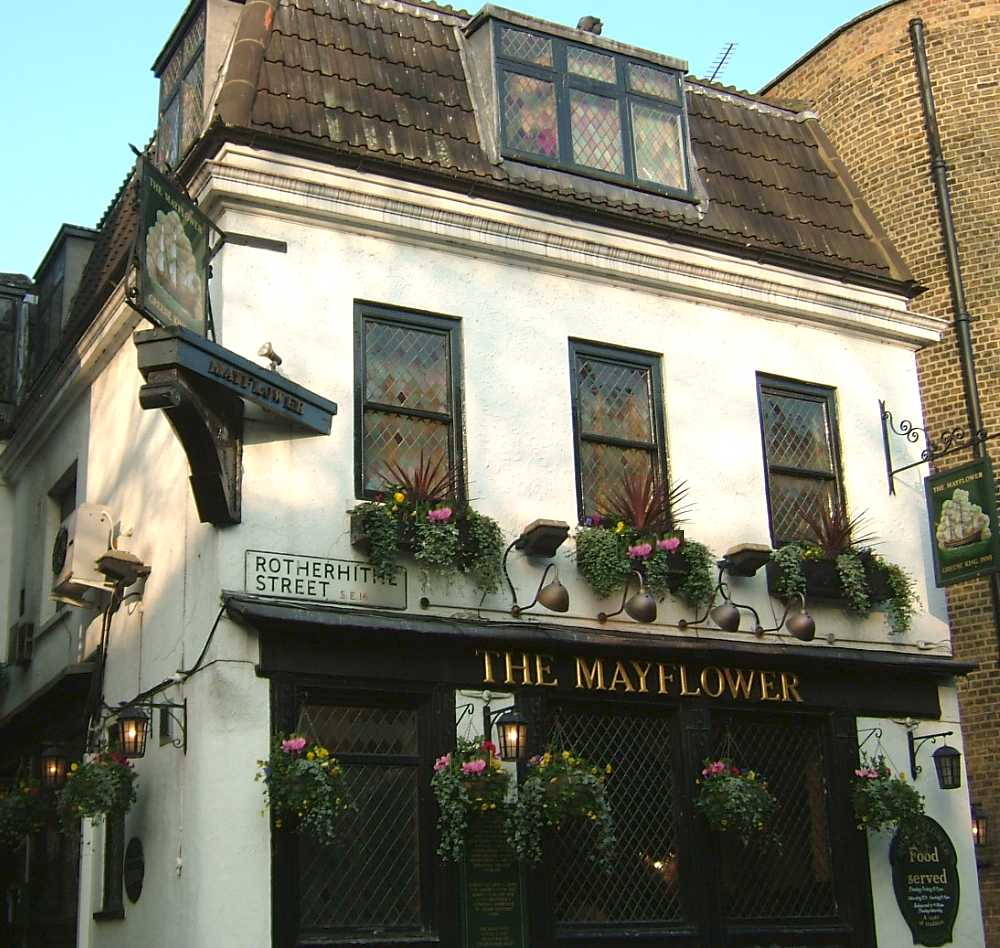
- Mayflower pub on Rotherhithe Street
- Interactive map of Rotherhithe Street
- Owner: London Borough of Southwark
- Length: 1.5 mi (2.4 km)
- Postal code: SE16
- Nearest metro station: Rotherhithe railway station

Other
- Known for: Longest road in London

Rotherhithe Street is a road in the London Borough of Southwark on the Thames Path. At a length of around 1.5 miles (2.4 km), it is the longest street in London. Notable buildings on the street include the Grade II* listed Nelson House, St Mary's Church, Rotherhithe and Surrey Docks Farm.

== Features ==
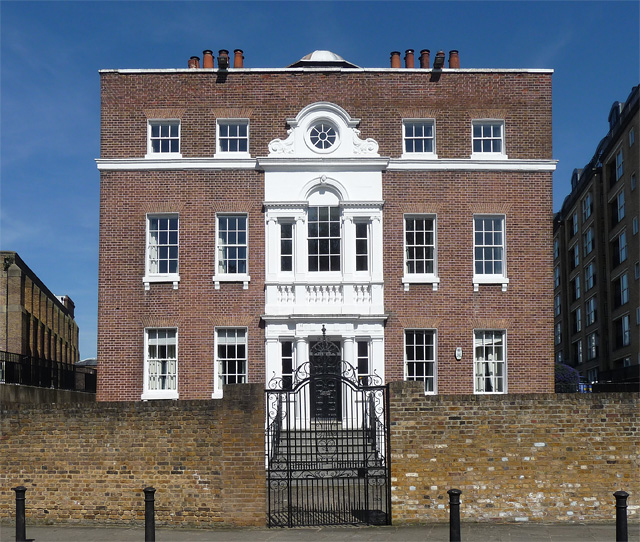
Nelson House, situated on Rotherhithe Street

Owing to the bending of the River Thames in the area, Rotherhithe Street is around 1.5 miles (2.4 km) long, making it the longest street in London. The road runs parallel to the River Thames, and comprises part of the Thames Path.

The street contains the 18th century Grade II* listed Nelson House, a Georgian house situated next to Nelson Dock. Nelson Dock is a dry dock, active from the 17th century until 1968, and now has the ship La Dame de Serk permanently moored. The Mayflower pub, a pub named after the Pilgrim Fathers' ship, and which claims to be the oldest London riverside pub, is situated on Rotherhithe Street, as is the city farm Surrey Docks Farm. Other significant buildings on the street include the Trinity Halls and Church, which were built in 1836, the former Rotherhithe fire station, which was active from 1906 until 1965 and has been converted to riverside flats, and the free entry Rotherhithe Heritage Museum. At one end of the street is St Mary's Church, Rotherhithe, where Prince Lee Boo is buried. There is also a Hilton hotel on Rotherhithe Street, and around 2 acres (8,100 m^{2}) of former dockland near to the street has been converted into a nature park.

In 1868, a number of timber buildings on Rotherhithe Street including the White Lion pub were badly damaged by a fire. In 1893, two pubs on the street, The Three Compasses and Noah's Ark, were both put up for sale, and in 1900, a mill at 9-13 Rotherhithe Street was also put up for sale. The house at 1 Fulford Street was formerly 41 Rotherhithe Street until the creation of King's Stairs Gardens from the mid 1960s.

== Transport ==
Towards one end of Rotherhithe Street is the Rotherhithe Tunnel, which goes under the Thames and links Rotherhithe with Wapping. Thames Clippers operate a ferry between Rotherhithe Street and Canary Wharf. In 2020, plans were announced for a new Transport for London owned electric ferry service between Rotherhithe and Canary Wharf, replacing previous plans for a bridge between the two areas. The street is planned to become part of the Rotherhithe Cycleway.
