= Surrey Docks Farm =

City farm in London, England

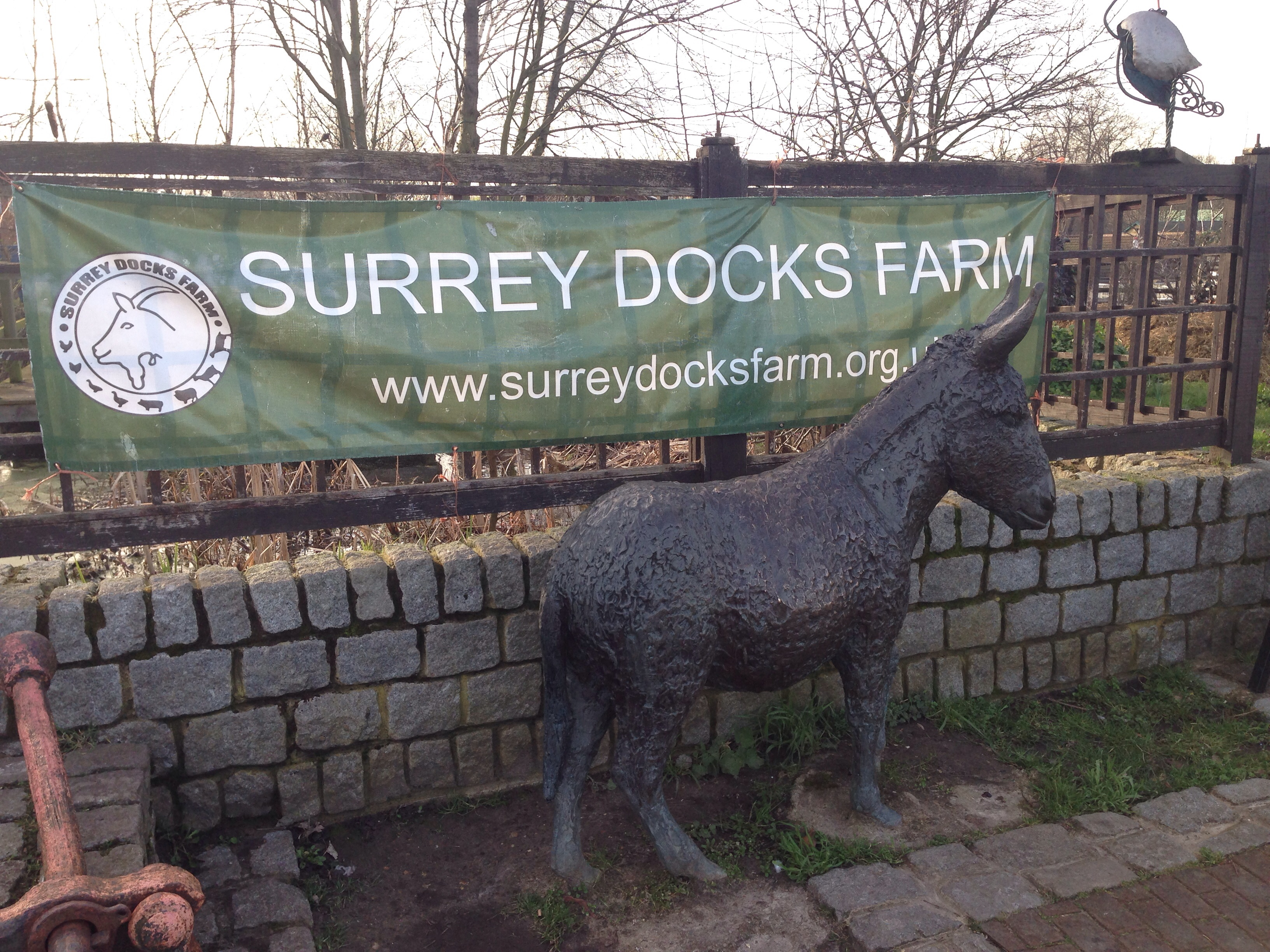
- Thames Entrance to Surrey Docks Farm

- Location within Greater London
- Type: City Farm
- Location: Rotherhithe, London
- Coordinates: 51.4997°N 0.0339°W
- Status: Open year round
- Website: www.surreydocksfarm.org.uk

Surrey Docks Farm is a working city farm in the heart of London. It occupies a 2.2-acre (8,900 m^{2}) site on the south bank of the River Thames in Rotherhithe.

== Activities ==
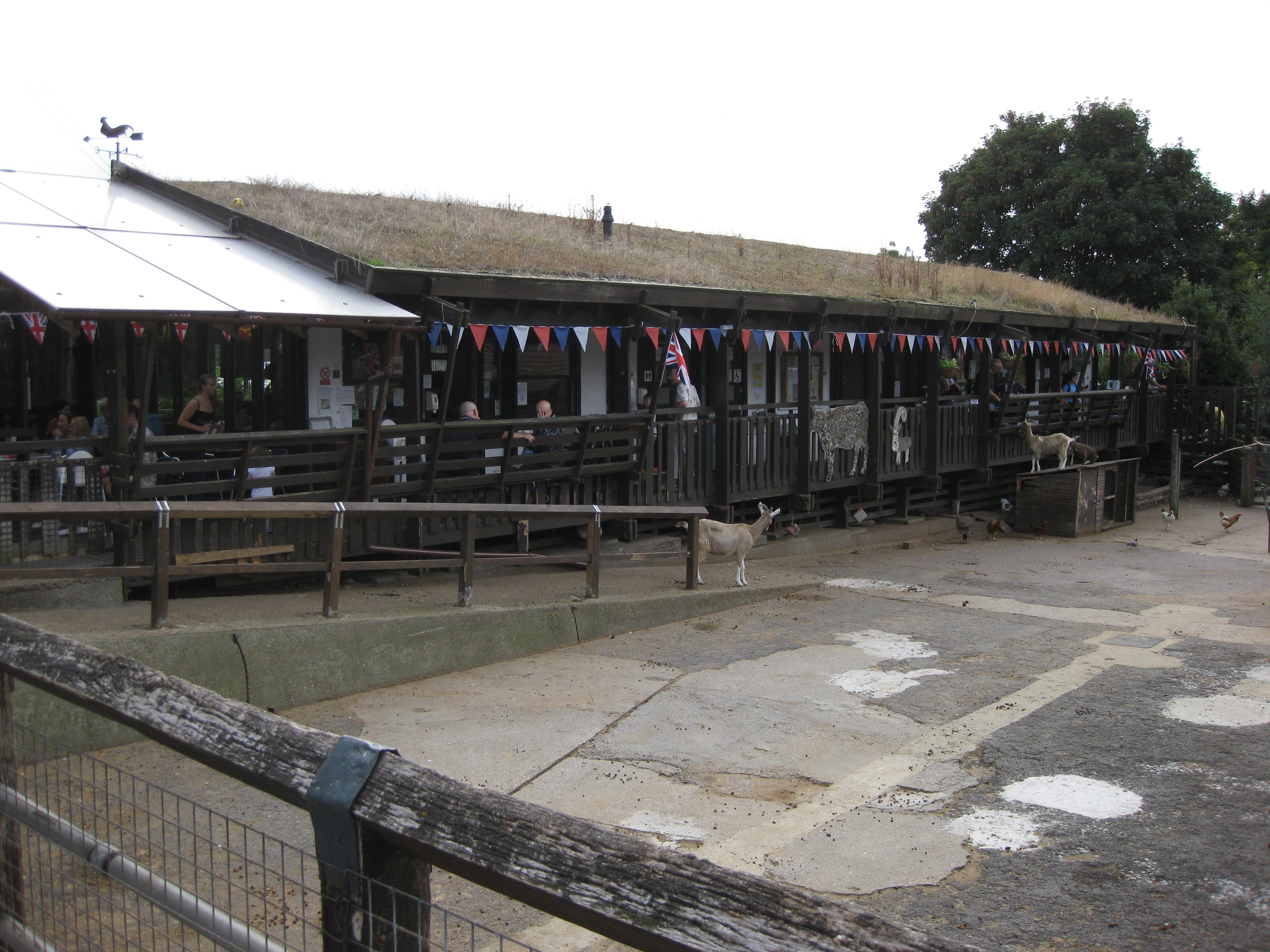
Walter Segal building at Surrey Docks Farm

The farm works with local communities and the people of Southwark to provide opportunities for people to learn about farming and food production, and to be actively involved in the ongoing work of the farm. Animals reared on the farm include Toggenburg and Anglo-Nubian goats, Oxford Down sheep, Oxford Sandy and Black pigs, ducks, geese, chickens, ferrets, rabbits, Guinea pigs, donkeys, a miniature Shetland pony and bees. The herds and flocks are farmed with specific attention to animal welfare. There are a variety of green and horticultural areas such as the orchard, herb garden, dye garden, vegetable plots, and the wild area home to native species of birds and amphibians. Fresh food and produce are on sale to the public. Other facilities include a bee room, café, working blacksmith’s forge and adult education rooms. There is a fully equipped classroom used by schools from across London.

== Management ==
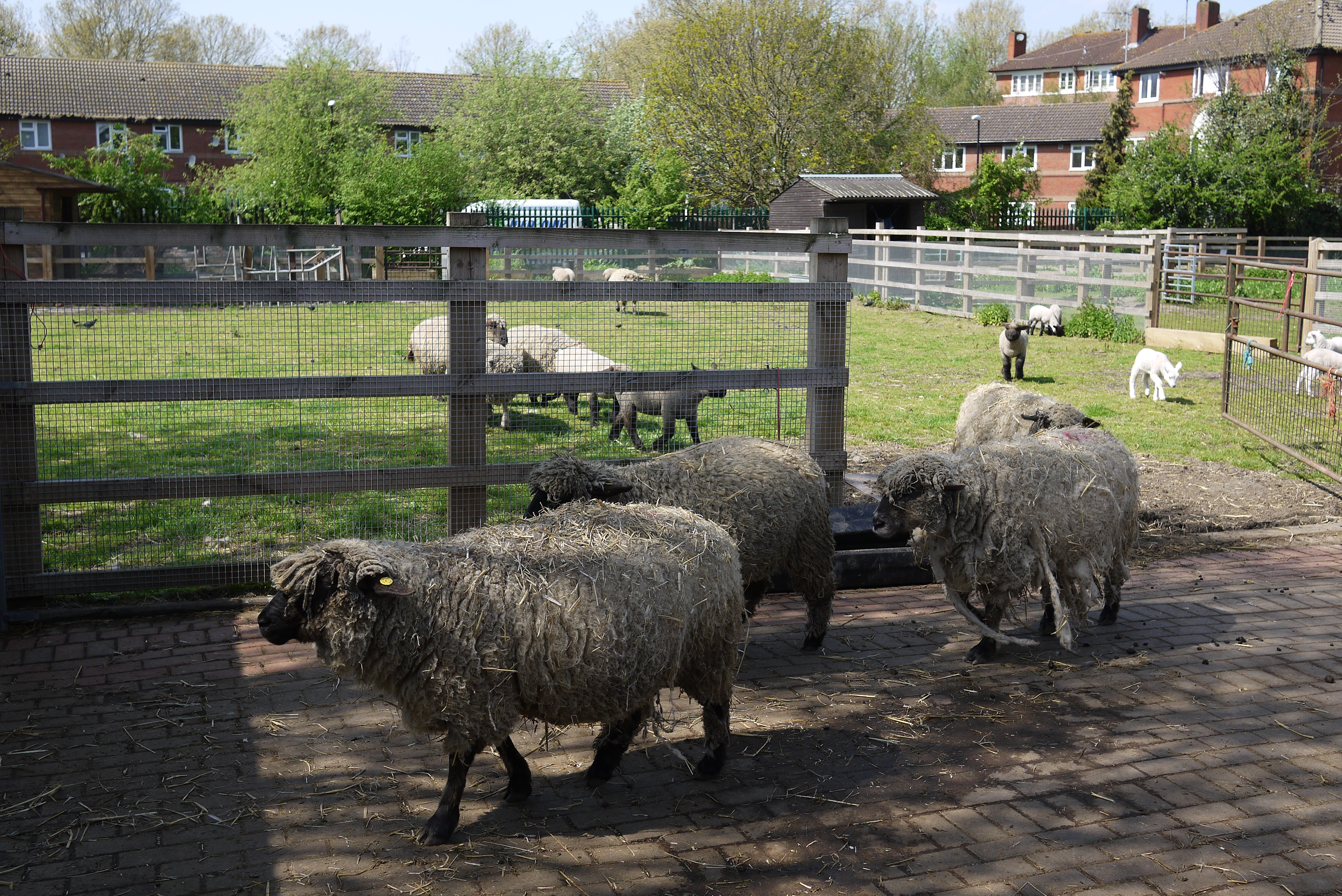
Sheep at Surrey Docks Farm

The farm is managed by the Surrey Docks Farm Provident Society Ltd, a tax exempt charitable organisation registered with the Financial Services Authority, and with HM Revenue & Customs (registration number 22829R). Current patrons of the Society include the Bishop of Southwark and former MP Simon Hughes. The Society particularly encourages membership applications from local people to ensure that they are at the forefront of what is essentially a local community project. Committee members of the Provident Society are elected at the Annual General Meeting.

== History ==
The farm was first established in 1975 on a 1.5-acre (6,100 m^{2}) site of derelict dockland between the entrance to Greenland Dock and the River Thames on Rotherhithe Street by Hilary Peters. Its initial purpose was to try and raise livestock and produce food from what was regarded as wasteland. In April 1980 the Farm registered as a Provident Society; it has now become a community benefit society.

In June 1986 the farm was re-located to its present site, a new 2.2-acre (8,900 m^{2}) site on the River Thames at South Wharf. During the working lifetime of the docks South Wharf formed part of the largest shipyard on the Rotherhithe peninsula. It subsequently became a timber wharf, and then, from 1883, it became the Metropolitan Asylums Board's South Wharf Receiving Station for transfer of smallpox and fever patients. The receiving station was bombed in 1940, and not rebuilt.

From 1983 to 2003, education worker Daphne Ferrigan lived and worked at the farm with her family, during which time she developed and delivered a range of education programmes such as a willow weaving workshop. Daphne died at the age of 64 on 2nd November 2016 of an aortic dissection.

For the last few years of his life until June 2011, the farm was managed by local campaigner Barry Mason.

In 2014 a UCL team of staff and students, led by Dr. Ilan Adler, designed and installed a biodigester at the farm with the purpose of turning the farm’s animal waste into sustainable energy and liquid fertilizer. The Sistema Biobolsa digester was the first of its kind to be installed in Europe.

On 14th September 2018, eleven two-week-old Oxford Sandy & Black piglets were stolen from the farm but were unable to be located, raising concerns that the animals were likely to die without feeding from their mothers. Following the incident, the farm began fundraising to upgrade its security systems in order to prevent further thefts and managed to raise nearly £1000 in donations from locals.

In 2019, with funding allocated by Southwark Council, the farm started work on its Riverfront Development plan to transform the site's unused and abandoned spaces into a new range of community facilities. By December 2020, a new waterside events space, meeting space, office, teaching kitchen and an extension of the Thames Path had been constructed at the farm with the involvement of PUP Architects. The project was named winner of the Mayor’s Prize in the New London Awards 2020.

Following the death of the farm's two ferrets Buddy and Booboo in 2020, the farm's youth committee launched a fundraising campaign in the spring of 2023 to pay for a new ferret enclosure and three new ferrets. The campaign was a success with the children managing to raise £1,775 in total across four separate events at the farm.
