= King Edward III manor house =

Former house in Rotherhithe, London

Coordinates: 51.500425°N 0.059548°W

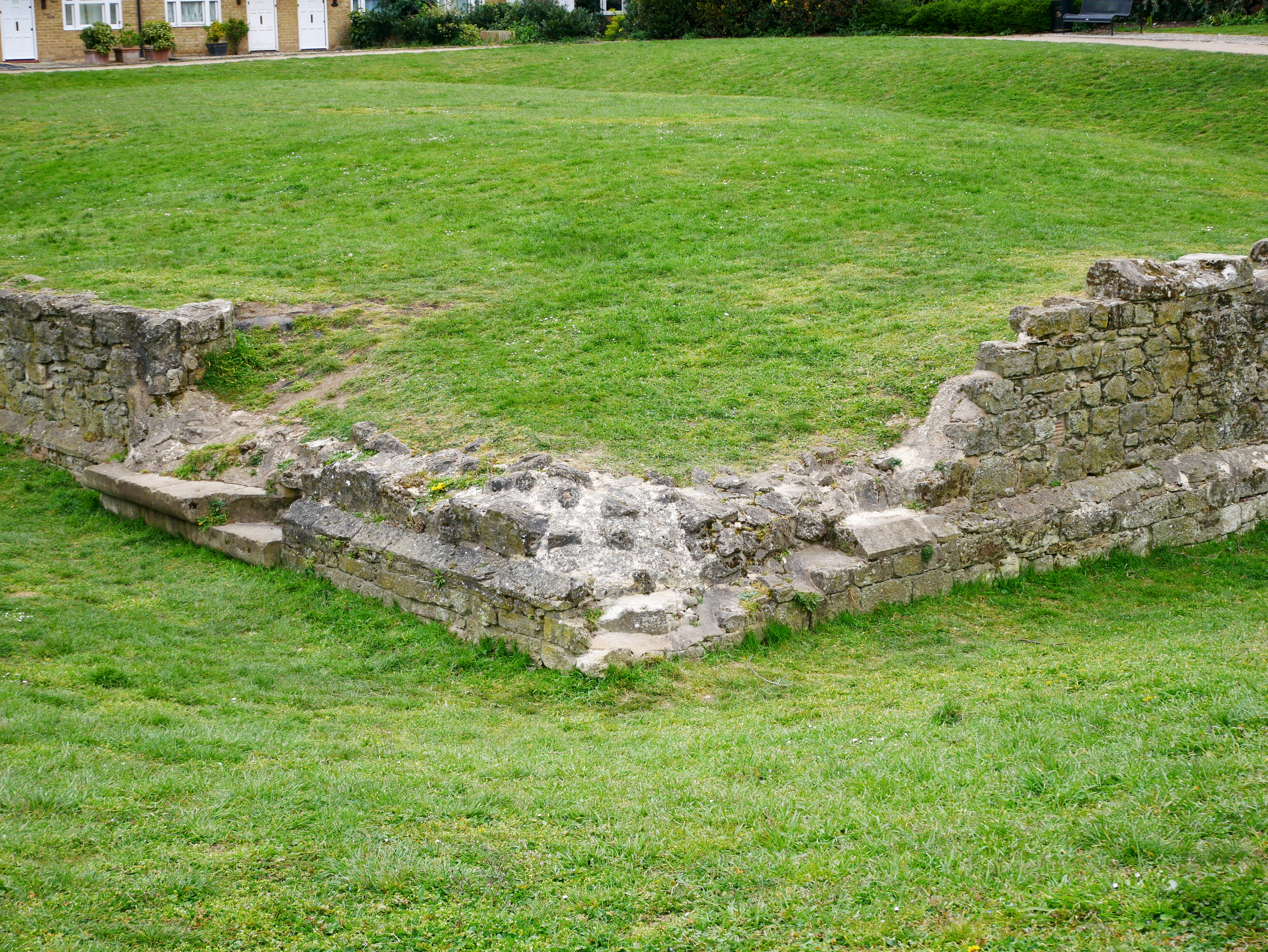
The northeast corner of the remains of Edward III's Manor House, Rotherhithe

The remains of the so-called King Edward III manor house are near the Thames in Rotherhithe in London.

== Foundation ==
The earliest reliable reference to a manor at Rotherhithe is recorded in 1127 when Henry I granted half of the manor to the monks of Bermondsey Abbey. The present moated house was built around 1350 by King Edward III when Rotherhithe was just a small hamlet. It was placed on a small island and consisted of several stone buildings arranged around a courtyard. These included a hall with a fireplace, the private apartments of the king, kitchens and further buildings. The function of the house is disputed. It seems unlikely that it was a hunting lodge as there was no attached royal park. However, it has been suggested that it was a falconry. The north wall fronted on to the river.

After Edward III's death, the manor house was conveyed to the Cistercian abbey of St Mary Graces by the Tower, and then, in 1399, to Bermondsey Abbey.

== Later history ==
In the 16th century, after the Dissolution of the Monasteries, the house was sold to private owners. In the 17th century the place became a pottery. In the following 18th and 19th century the area was built up with warehouses and the remains of the manor house were incorporated into a warehouse. The façade of the manor house was still standing in 1907. The warehouse was demolished in the 1970s. Excavations were conducted in the 1980s and the remaining parts preserved.

== Visible remains ==
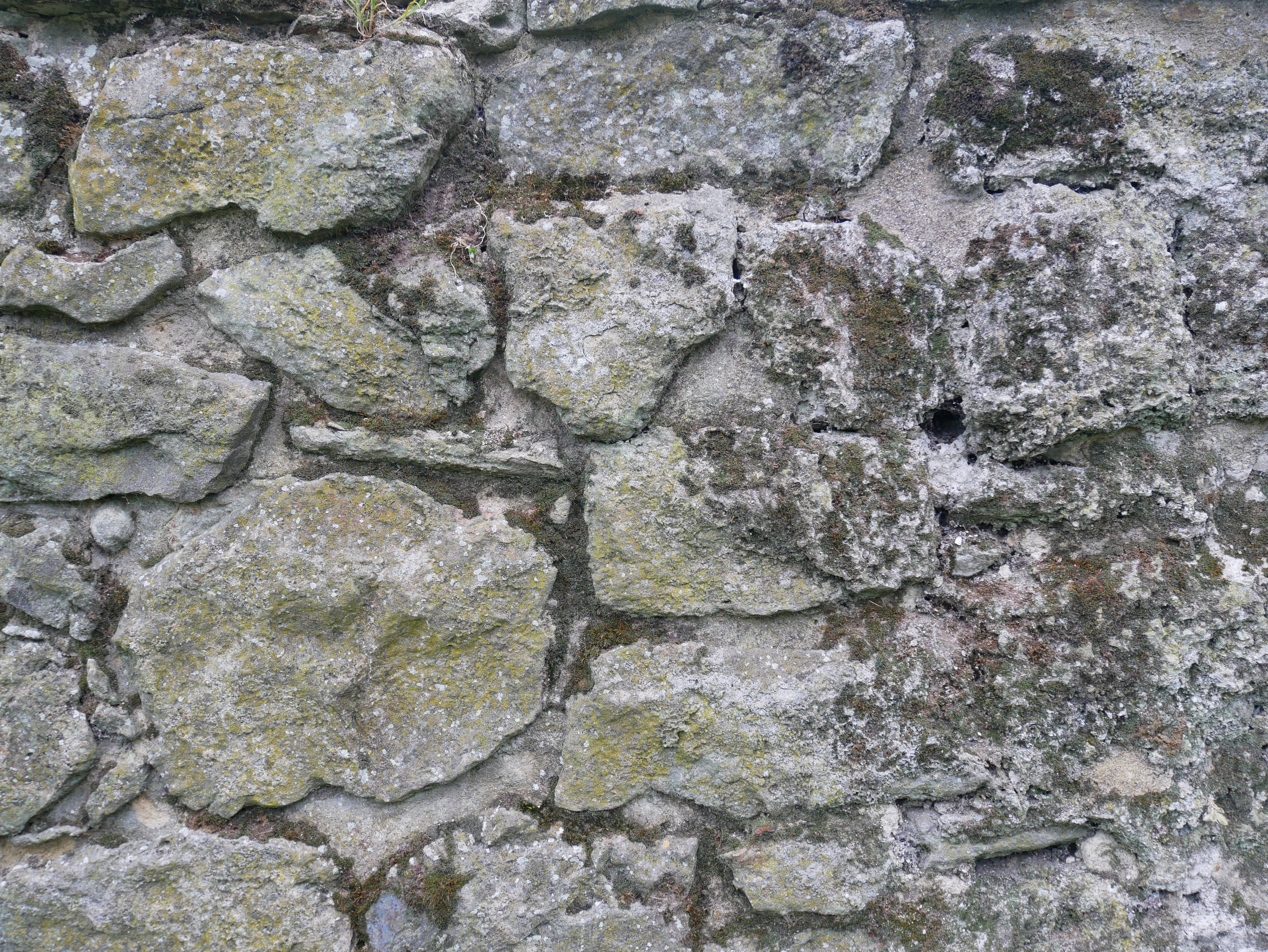
Detail of the masonry in the surviving north wall

The walls are constructed of ashlar blocks to plinth level with a coursed rubble superstructure and vary between 0.8 and 1.2 m in thickness. Part of the north, east and west walls survive as exposed upstanding remains, but the rest of the structure has been reburied following the excavations in the 1980s. The north wall survives to 3.9 m high and the east wall to 3.8 m.

== Scheduled monument ==
The manor house was scheduled as a scheduled monument under the Ancient Monuments and Archaeological Areas Act 1979 in 1988. The extent of the scheduling excludes the modern housing at the southern end of the site. It includes the underground of the reclaimed land up to the river's edge, on top of which are statues of Dr Alfred Salter and his social reformer wife Ada Salter.

== Conservation Area ==
Together with the nearby King's Stairs Gardens park, the manor house forms part of London Borough of Southwark’s Edward III's Rotherhithe Conservation Area.
