= Walter Segal =

German Swiss architect (1907-85)

- Born: 15 May 1907; Berlin, Germany
- Died: 27 October 1985 (aged 78); London, England
- Occupation: Architect
- Known for: Segal self-build method
- Spouse: Eva Bradt (m. 1940; died 1950) Mary Moran Scott (m. 1962)
- Father: Arthur Segal

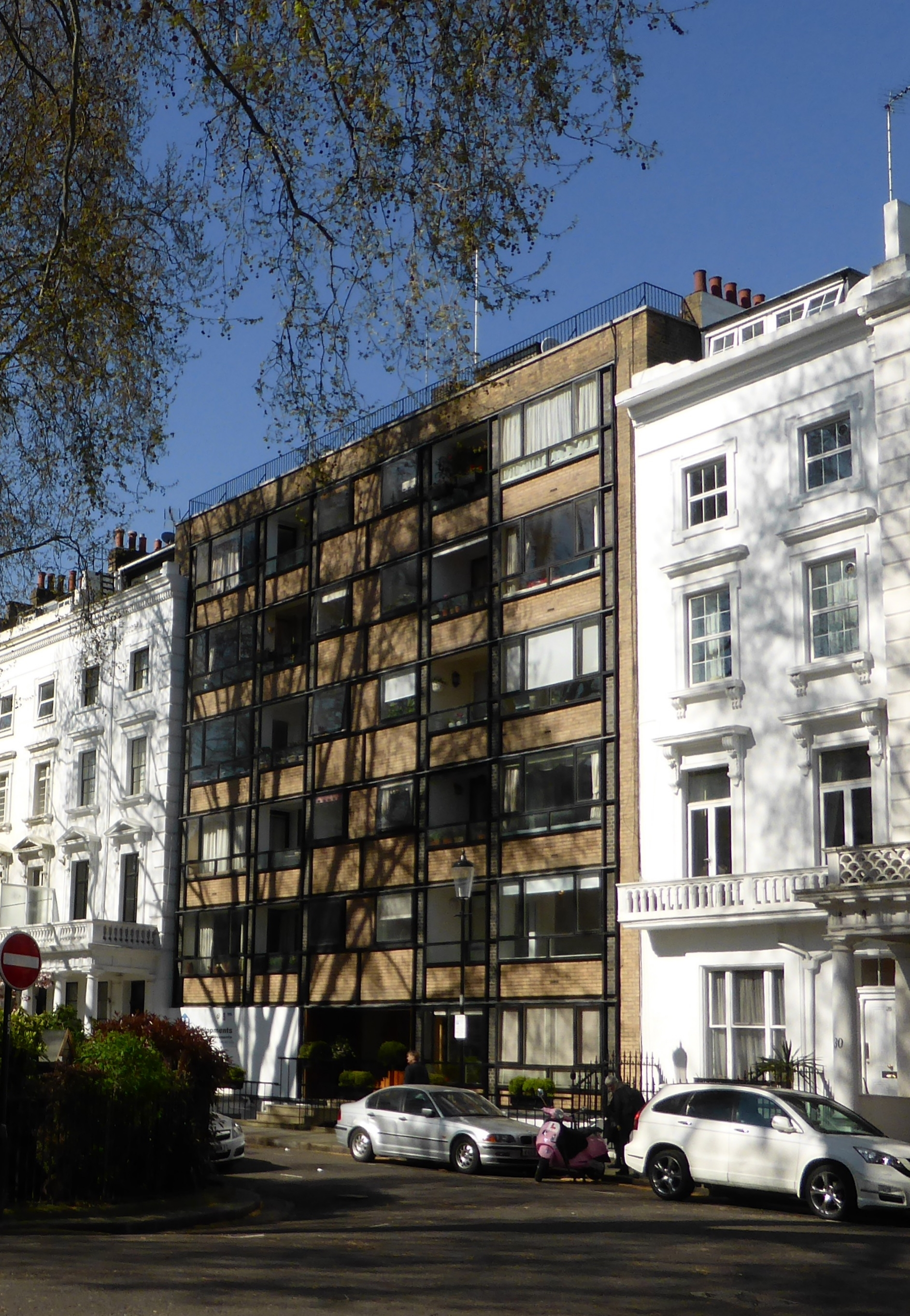
Segal-designed apartment building that replaced an earlier building destroyed in the Blitz, Knightsbridge, 1957

Walter Segal (15 May 1907 – 27 October 1985) was an architect who developed a system of self-build housing, the Segal self-build method. Based on traditional timber frame methods modified to use standard modern materials, his method eliminates the need for wet trades such as bricklaying and plastering, resulting in a light-weight method which can be built with minimal experience and is ecologically sound. The roofs tend to be flat with many layers of roofing felt, which allows the creation of grass-covered roofs. Foundations are minimal, often just paving slabs, the strength coming from the geometry of their construction. Segal houses have been compared to traditional Japanese houses.

== Early life ==
Segal was born in 1907 in Berlin, Germany, and grew up in Ascona, Switzerland, as the son of the Romanian Jewish painter Arthur Segal and artist Ernestine Chavas. They spent the time of the First World War in Ascona close to an alternative community called Monte Verità. Walter Segal studied architecture among the pioneers of the Modern Movement in Berlin and Delft, Netherlands, and received his first commission in 1932 from a patron of his father, Bernhard Mayer, to build a small wooden holiday cabin in Ascona. This was followed by further commissions in Ascona and later in Majorca. In 1934–1935 he worked in Egypt studying and illustrating dynastic chairs and stools, primarily those from the tomb of Tutankhamun.

He moved to London, UK in 1936 where he met and eventually married Eva Bradt, a student at the Architectural Association School of Architecture. He taught at the school, wrote in trade journals, published a couple of books and had a few small architectural commissions. He worked on commissions for furniture and interior design and during the war he designed air raid shelters and hotels for the Ministry of Supply.

He lived in Highgate, London, and their son, John, was born in 1948. By then Segal had built his first main building, which was a block of flats in south London. Eva died in 1950.

== The little house in the garden ==
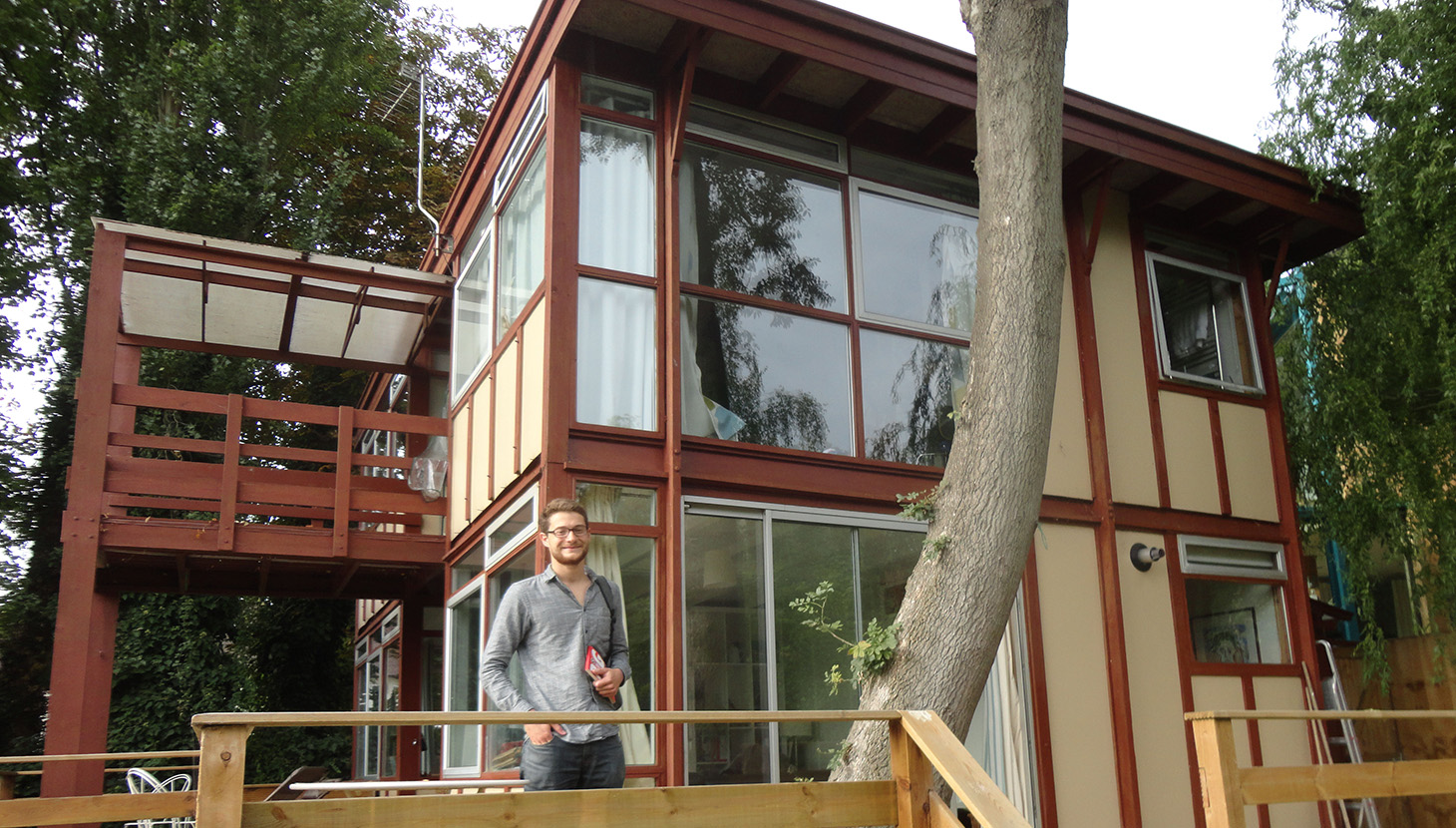
Historic Segal self build house at Walter's Way in Lewisham

In 1963 Segal married Moran Scott, who also lived in Highgate. To gain more living space, they eventually demolished and rebuilt Scott's house. They built a temporary structure in the garden using standard cladding materials and with no foundations other than paving slabs. It took two weeks to build and cost £800. This house, dubbed the "Little House in the Garden", roused considerable interest and led to a number of commissions using a similar style around the country. As the system developed the clients were able to do more and more of the building themselves.

In the 1970s Lewisham Borough Council made three small sites, unsuitable for mainstream housing, available for people to build their own homes using the method. Due to the success of these a fourth site was later made available.

== Legacy ==
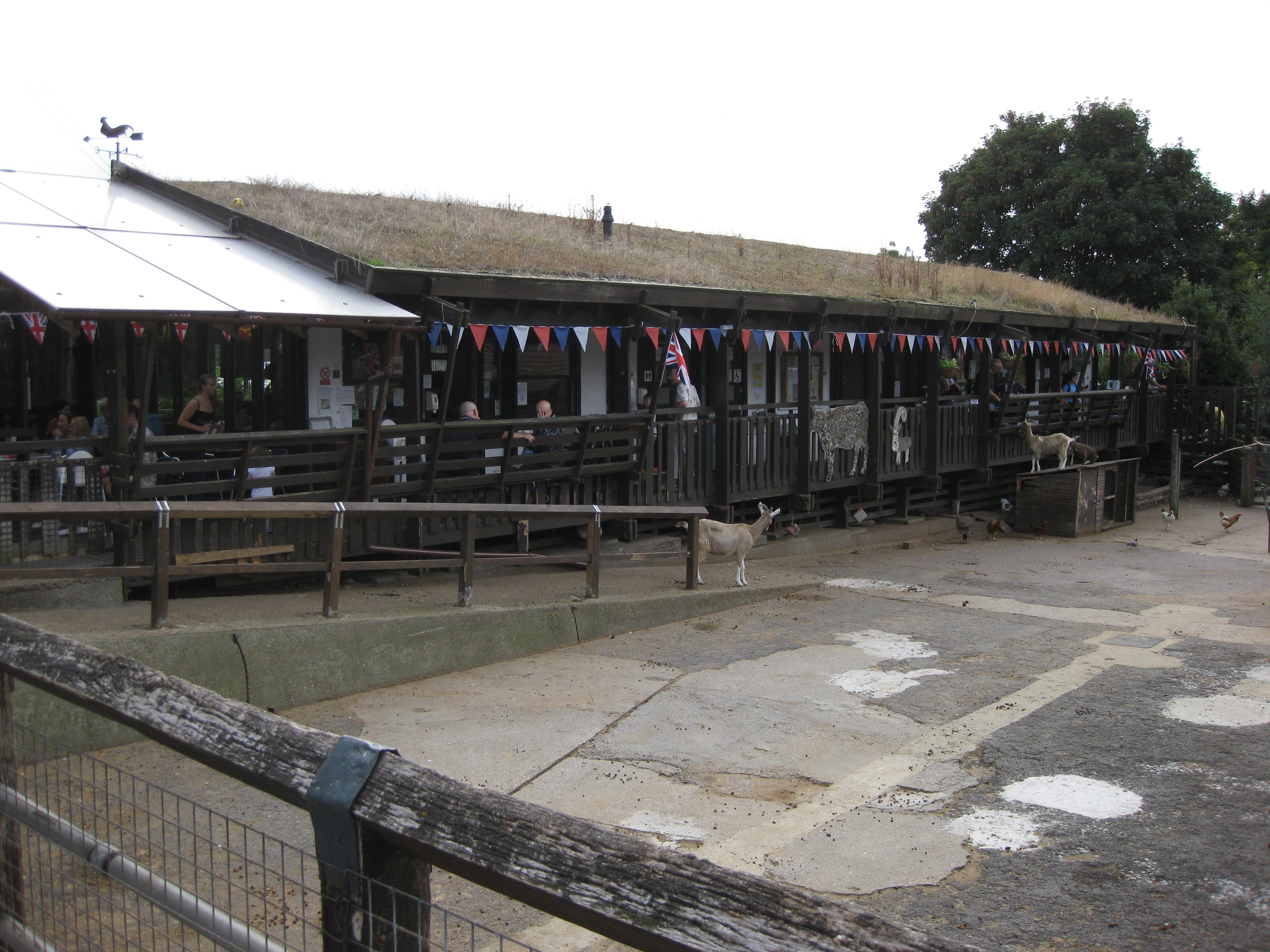
Walter Segal building at Surrey Docks Farm

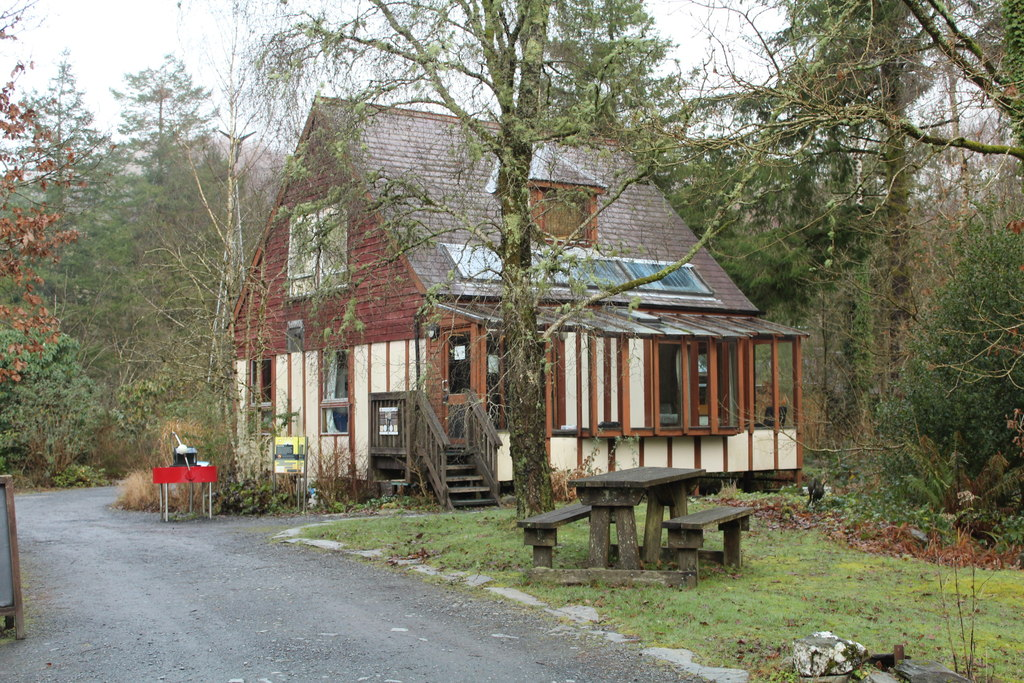
Segal self build house at the Center for Alternative Technology in Wales

After his death in 1985 the Walter Segal Self Build Trust was set up, and his methods have gained in popularity. A Segal house at the Centre for Alternative Technology has helped in spreading the system. At least six of these buildings and schemes have won awards, ranging from the prestigious Housing Project Design Award to Green Building of the Year. The dry-trade construction used in Segal method houses allowed such a building in London, constructed in 1988 and by 2012 scheduled for demolition, to be dismantled and re-erected on a new site.

As of 2016 there were approximately 200 Segal self-build houses in the UK.

== Bibliography ==
- Segal, Walter (1948). Home and Environment. Leonard Hill.
- Segal Walter (1945). Planning and Transport: Their Effects on Industry and Residence. Co-operative Permanent Building Society.
- Segal, Walter (December 1983). Learning From The Self-Builders.
- McKean, John (March 1976). "The Segal System". Architectural Design: 288–296.
- McKean, John (June 1986). "Semi prezio di buon senso". Spazio e Societa (in Italian). No. 34. Milano. pp. 18–26.
- McKean, John (1989). Learning from Segal: Walter Segal's Life, Work and Influence. Basel: Birkhaueser.
- McKean, John (1996). "Becoming an Architect in Europe Between the Wars" (PDF). Architectural History. 39: 124–146. doi:10.2307/1568610. JSTOR 1568610. S2CID 195032696.
- Grahame, Alice; McKean, John (2021). Walter Segal: Self-Built Architect. Lund Humphries. ISBN 978-1-84-822389-9.
