= Nelson House, London =

Listed building

Nelson House
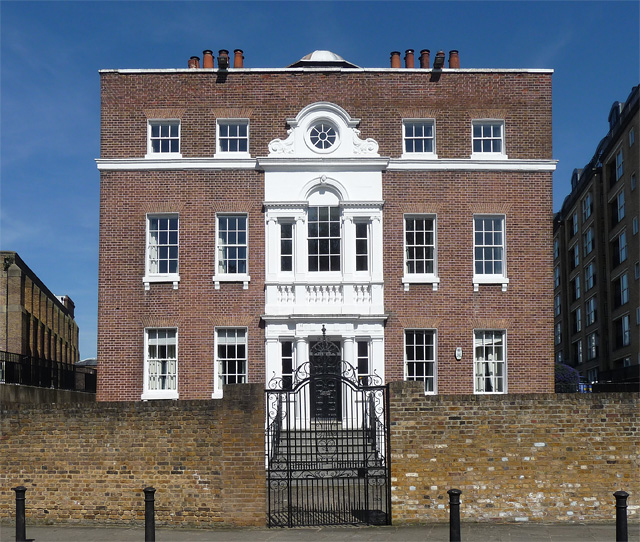
- Nelson House in 2013
- Interactive map of the Nelson House area
- Alternative names: Nelson Dock House

General information
- Status: Completed
- Type: House
- Architectural style: Georgian
- Classification: Grade II*
- Location: Rotherhithe, London Borough of Southwark, 265 Rotherhithe Street, London, United Kingdom
- Coordinates: 51°30′16″N 00°02′02″W
- Construction started: 1740s

Technical details
- Material: Stone brick

Nelson House, also known as Nelson Dock House, is a Grade II* listed building on Rotherhithe Street in the London Borough of Southwark. The house was built in the 1740s in the Georgian style and was historically home to shipbuilders including John Randall. The house is named after Horatio Nelson, 1st Viscount Nelson.

== History ==
Nelson House is located at 265 Rotherhithe Street, in the London Borough of Southwark. Rotherhithe Street is London's longest street, at a length of around 1.5 miles (2.4 km).

Nelson House was built in the 1740s on the site of a former shipyard, in the Georgian style. The three-storey building is composed of stone brick, and contains Doric columns, and Venetian windows. The building's roof contains an octagonal glazed cupola. Historically, the house was used by shipbuilders, and is the only remaining shipbuilders' house in Rotherhithe. In the late 18th and early 19th century, Nelson House was owned by shipbuilder John Randall. He is believed to have committed suicide by jumping out of one of Nelson House's windows in 1803. In the 19th century after the Battle of Trafalgar, the house was named Nelson House in honour of Horatio Nelson, 1st Viscount Nelson.

Nelson House is situated next to Nelson Dock. The front of the building unusually faces away from Nelson Dock, possibly in order that the building could lead to the shipyard. When built, the front of the building faced towards fields, although nowadays the house faces Rotherhithe Street.

Nowadays, Nelson House is used as offices, and is not accessible to the public. The house became a Grade II* listed building in 1949, and the wrought iron railings for the stone steps to enter the house are also listed.
