= Arthur Segal (painter) =

Romanian painter

- Aron Sigalu
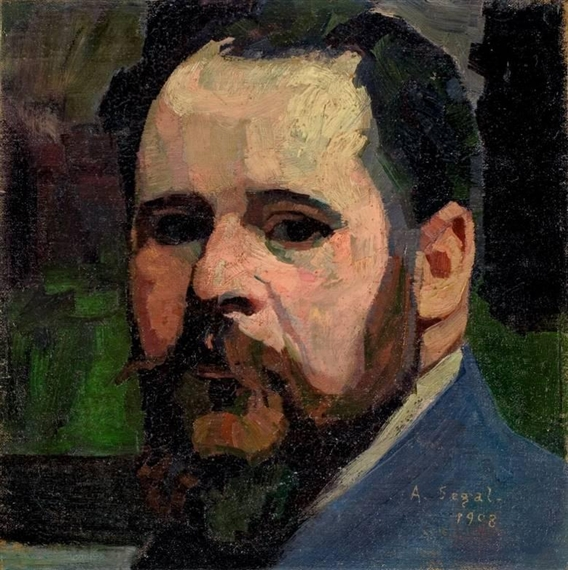
- Self-portrait (1908)
- Born: 23 July 1875; Iași, United Principalities of Moldavia and Wallachia
- Died: 23 June 1944 (aged 68); London, England
- Education: Prussian Academy of Arts
- Movement: New Secession
- Children: Marianne, Walter

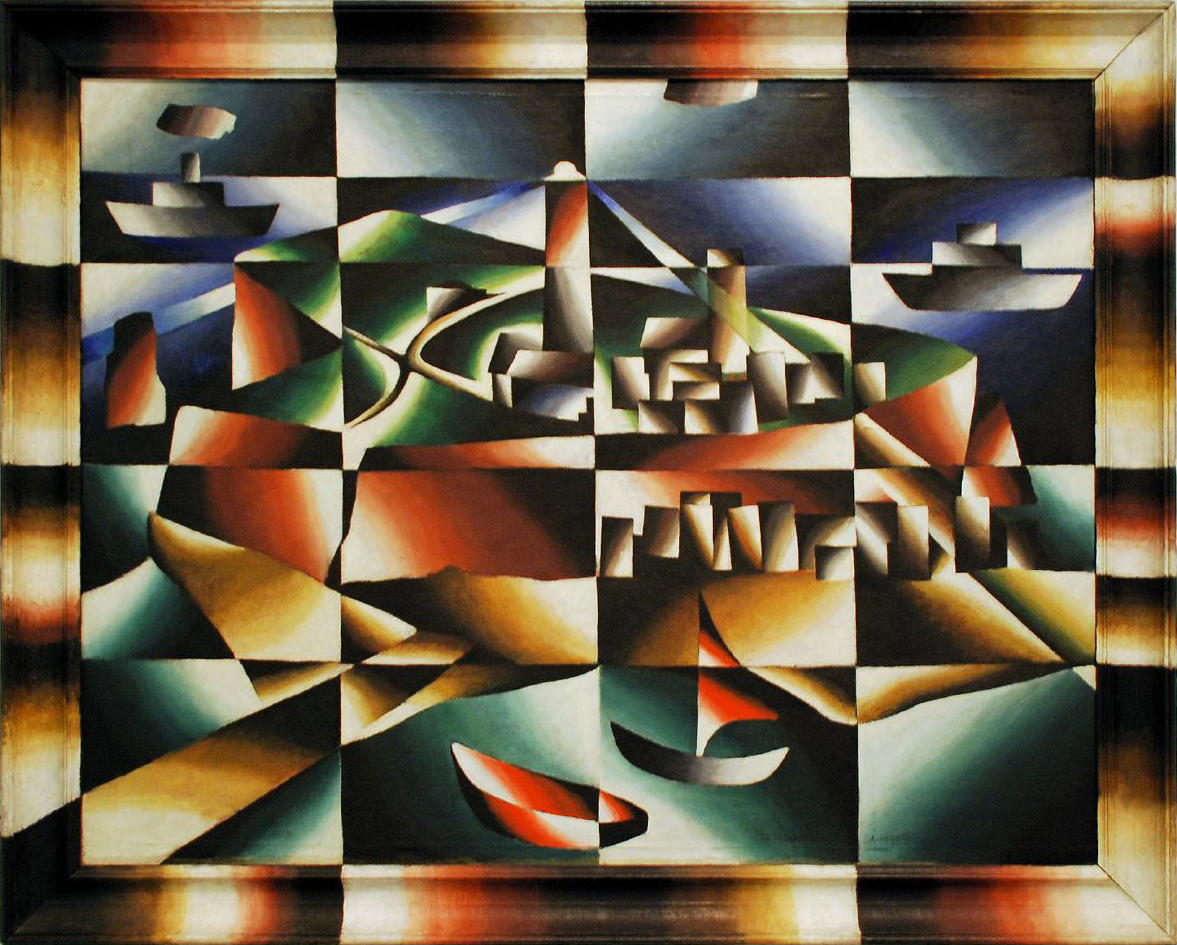
Helgoland, 1923

Arthur Segal (23 July 1875 – 23 June 1944) was a Romanian artist and author.

== Early life ==
Segal was born to Jewish parents in Iaşi in the United Principalities of Moldavia and Wallachia, and studied at the Berlin Academy from 1892. He studied with Schmid-Reutte and Hölzel in Munich in 1896, and later studied in Paris and Italy in the early 1900s.

== Career ==
After studying in Paris and Italy, he eventually moved to Berlin in 1904 where he exhibited his work with Die Brucke and Der Blaue Reiter, two leading German expression groups. In 1910 he co-founded the Neue Sezession, a group of artists whose work was rejected by the Berliner Sezession.

On the outbreak of war in 1914 he moved to Ascona, Switzerland, with his family, and remained there until 1920. During the war, Switzerland became a refuge for many artists like Segal, and whilst he was there he exhibited some of his work with Arp and Dada in the Cabaret Voltaire in Zurich. In 1919 he joined the Novembergruppe, and was involved in their shows 1921-1925 and 1927-1931, and was soon elected to their board. He was offered a teaching job at the Bauhaus in Dessau, but he declined. Because of his Jewish background he was prevented from exhibiting his work in Germany, and so in 1933 he moved to Palma, Mallorca and then London, where he set up another school with his daughter Marianne. He died in London.

Segal was firstly a painter, and his early work was heavily influenced by impressionism and neo-impressionism. From around 1910 he began a more expressionism and dadaism style, and around 1916 found his own modern style. As well as painting, he also produced woodcuts from 1910, many of which were anti-war themed. Segal was also the author of many books, articles, and often gave lectures.

His son was the architect Walter Segal.

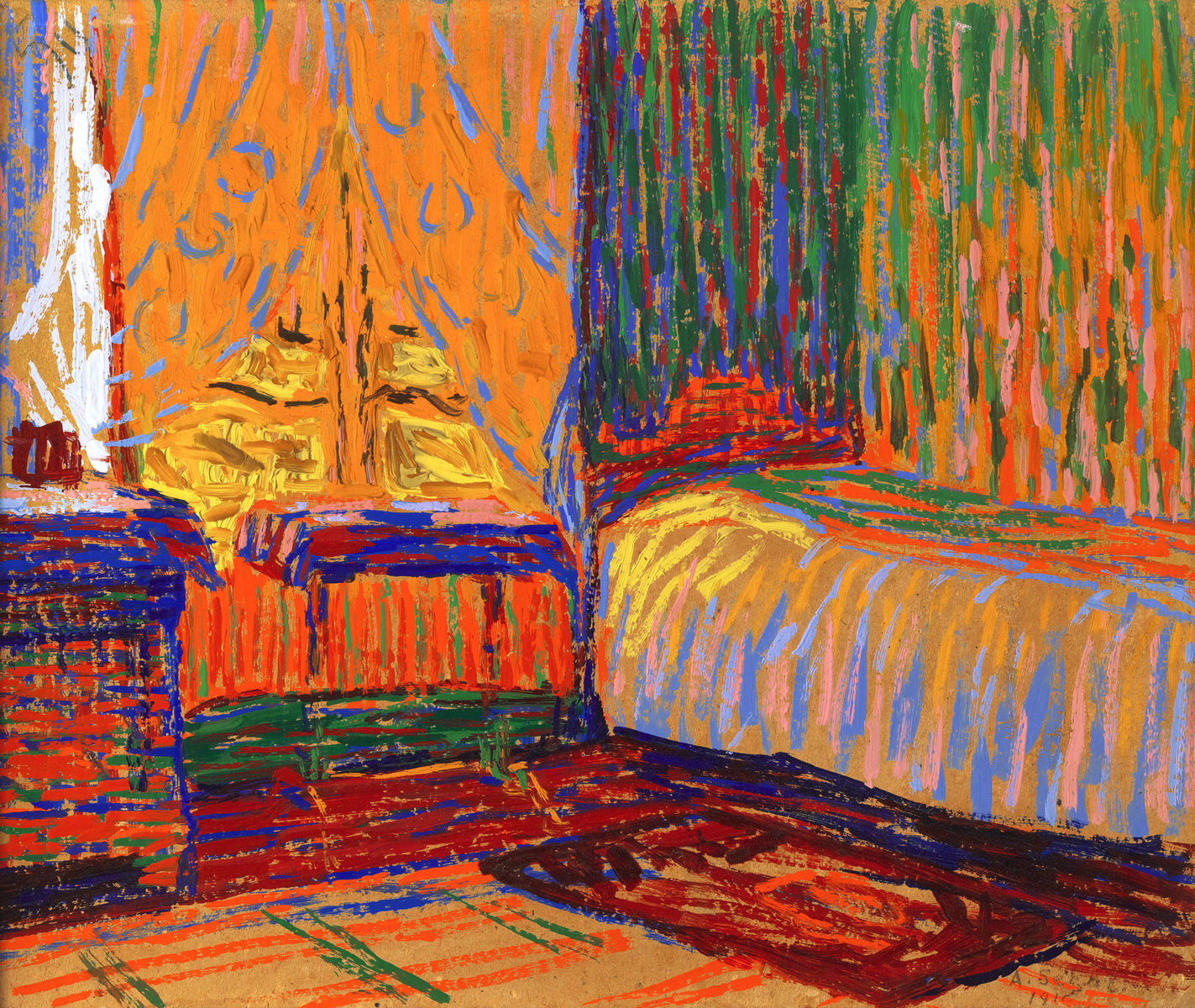
Interieur, 1910. Oil on board. Private collection.
