= Arthur Segal (archaeologist) =

Israeli archaeologist

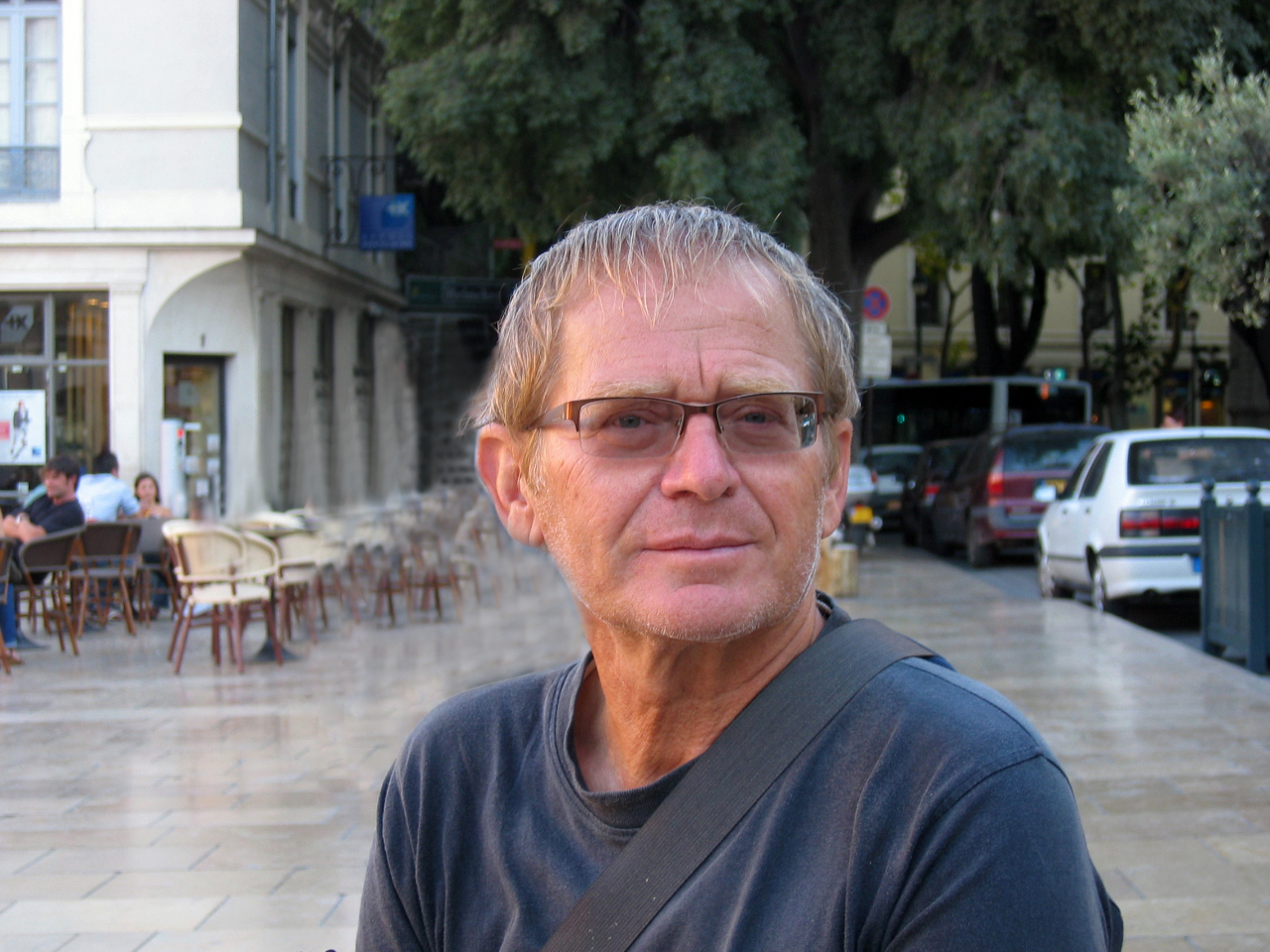
Arthur Segal

Arthur Segal (Hebrew: ארתור סגל) is an Israeli archaeologist. he was born in Poland (1946) and immigrated to Israel in 1965. He completed his university studies at the Hebrew University in Jerusalem (PhD 1975) and his post doctorate at the Institute of Classical Studies, University of London (1975–1977). Between 1977 and 1982 he lectured at Ben Gurion University of the Negev in Beer Sheba and between 1983 and 2014 he was faculty member at the University of Haifa.

== Field work ==
Segal was involved in a few major archaeological projects, such as excavations along the southern wall of the Temple Mount in Jerusalem (1968–1969), survey and excavations of the Byzantine city of Shivta in the Negev Desert (1978–1982), excavations of the Late Hellenistic-Early Roman fortress in the area of kibbutz Sha'ar-Ha'Amakim in Northern Israel (1984–1998). In 2000 he initiated and headed an international excavation project at Hippos-Sussita of the Decapolis, a Roman-Byzantine city located above the eastern shore of the Sea of Galilee (the Kinneret Lake). During the first twelve seasons (2000–2011) substantial parts of the centre of this city have been exposed.

== Academic research ==
Segal regards himself as an architectural historian. His main fields of research are the town planning and architecture in the Graeco-Roman world in general and in the Roman East in particular.

== Published books ==
- A. Segal (1983), The Byzantine City of Shivta (Esbeita), Negev Desert, Israel, Oxford: BAR Inter. Ser. 179
- A. Segal (1988), Town-Planning and Architecture in Provincia Arabia, Oxford: BAR Inter. Ser. 419
- A. Segal (1988), Architectural Decoration in Byzantine Shivta, Oxford: BAR Inter. Ser. 420
- A. Segal, Theatres in Roman Palestine and Provincia Arabia, Leiden: E.J. Brill
- A. Segal (1997), From Function to Monument, Oxford: Oxbow Monographs 66
- A. Segal et al. (2009), Excavations of the Hellenistic Site in Kibbutz Sha'ar-Ha'Amakim (Gaba) 1984-1998, Final Report, Haifa: Zinman Institute of Archaeology
- A. Segal et al. (2013), Hippos (Sussita) of the Decapolis: The First Twelve seasons of Excavations (2000-2011), Haifa: Zinman Institute of Archaeology
- Segal, Arthur (2022) [2013]. Temples and sanctuaries in the Roman East: religious architecture in Syria, Iudaea/Palaestina and Provincia Arabia. Oxford and Oakville: Oxbow Books. ISBN 9781842175262.
