= King's Stairs Gardens =

Coordinates: 51°30′1″N 0°3′26″W

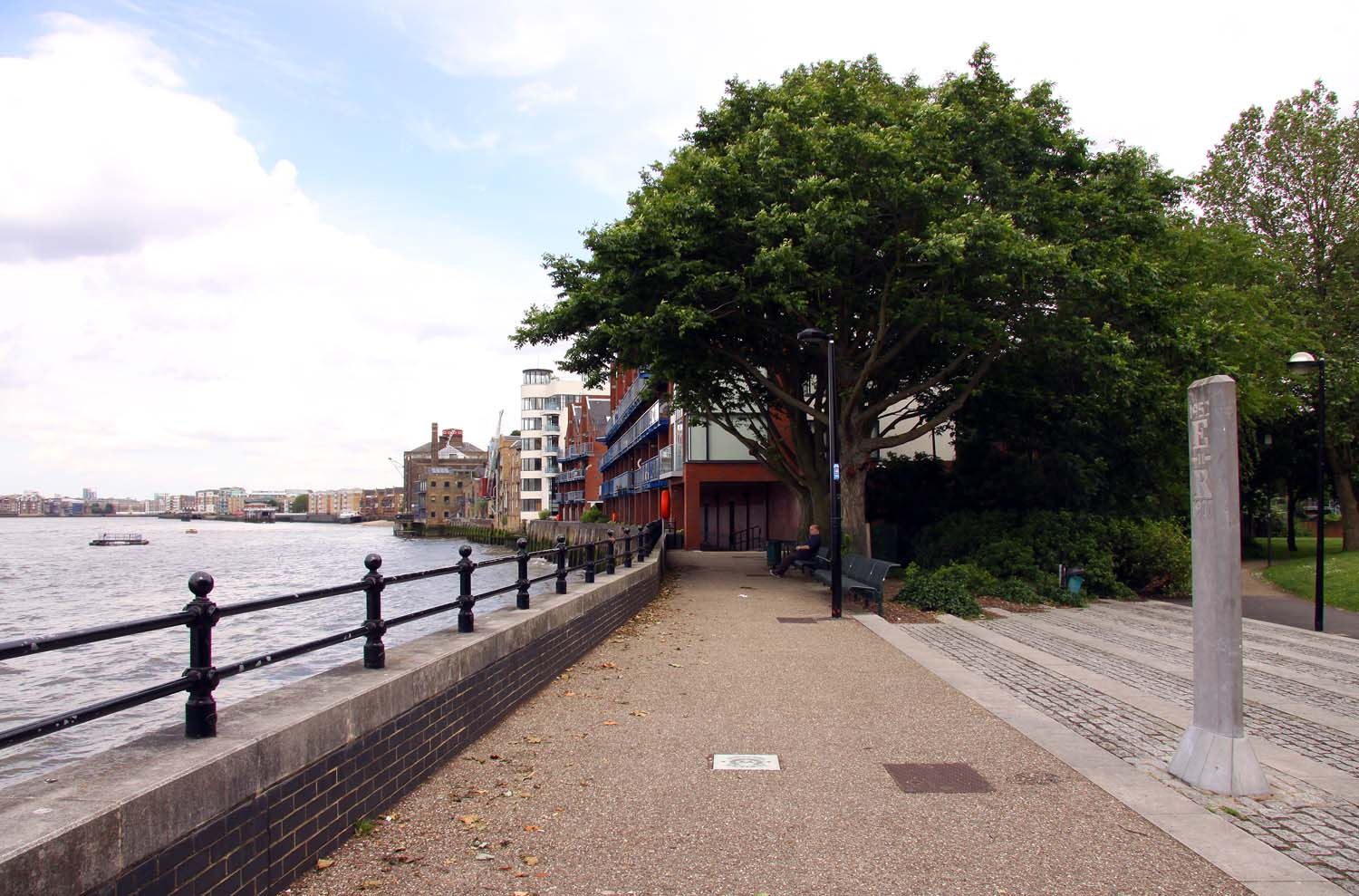
The Thames Path by King's Stairs Gardens

King's Stairs Gardens is a riverside park in Bermondsey, London, named after the stairs used by King Edward III to access his manor house from the River Thames. It is bordered to the north by the River Thames and to the south by Jamaica Road (A200), the other side of which is Southwark Park.

== Beginnings ==
In July 1947, the London County Council (LCC) declared Bermondsey a reconstruction area and, as part of wholesale post-war regeneration, approved the idea of extending Southwark Park to the river. The idea of a link to the river pre-dated the Second World War by a few years, but the post-war need to reconstruct gave this aim more resonance.

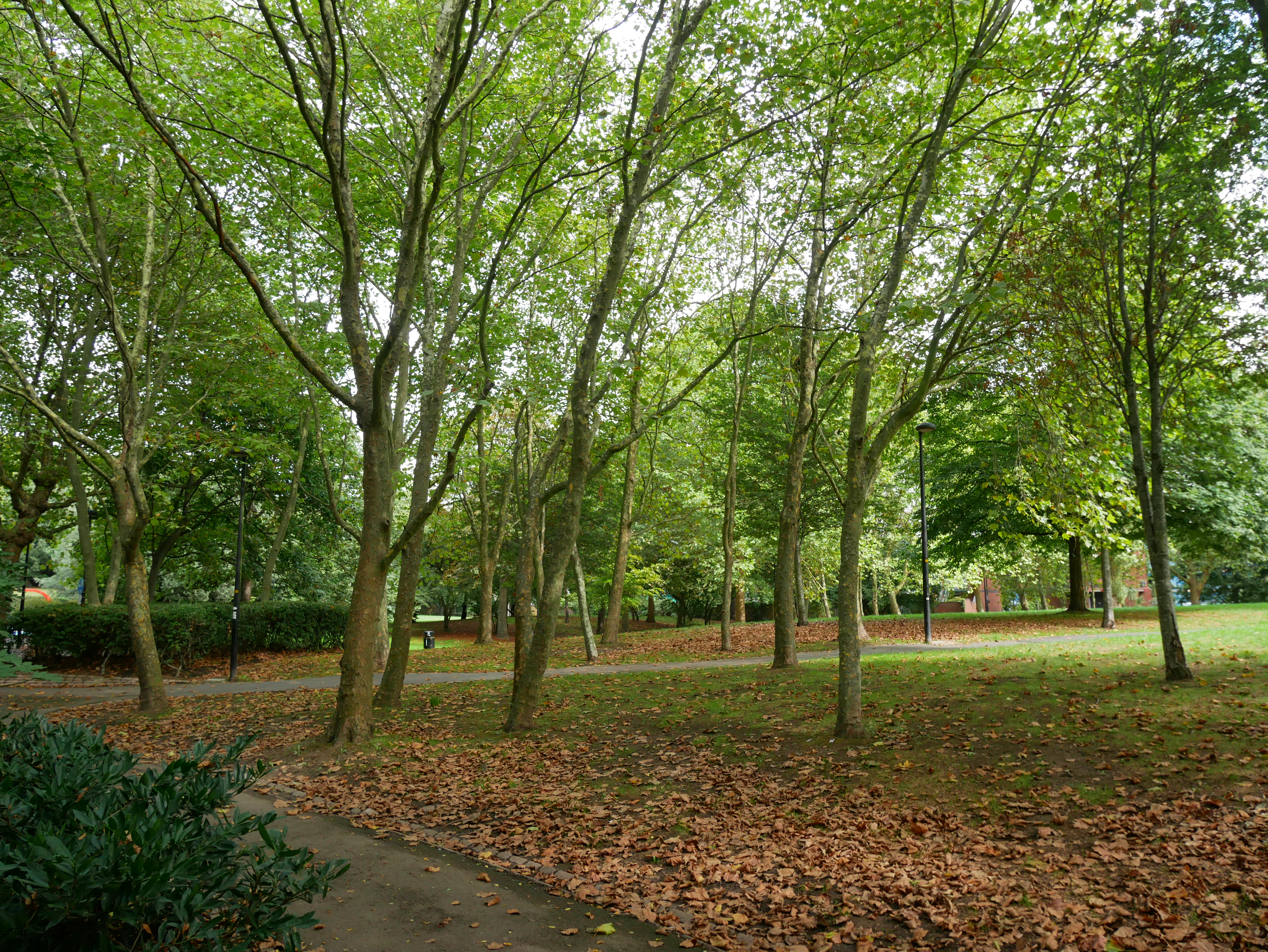
Trees in King's Stairs Gardens

In January 1948, the LCC Planning Committee endorsed the policy of a park by the river at King's Stairs riverside.

Putting the policy into practice proved to be a slow business because of a combination of objections from, among others, Bermondsey Council and local businesses. For instance, in 1953, the County of London Plan was subject to an Inquiry, and the Bermondsey and Rotherhithe Chambers of Commerce objected to the park extension.

In September 1954, the Ministry of Housing approved the compulsory purchase of land to extend the park, but this took a few years to implement.

In 1960, the LCC approved a design for the King's Stairs riverside walk, which was opened in November 1962. In January 1963, the LCC approved the name King's Stairs Gardens.

In 1964, the LCC agreed to a grassy area to the south of The Angel public house. Again, the implementation seems to have been delayed due to financial constraints, and it was not until 1968 that the Greater London Council (the successor body to the LCC) reappraised the site and agreed to three green space additions. These were finally completed by 1982, and it is in that form that King's Stairs Gardens still exists today.

== Queen Elizabeth II's Jubilee 1977 ==
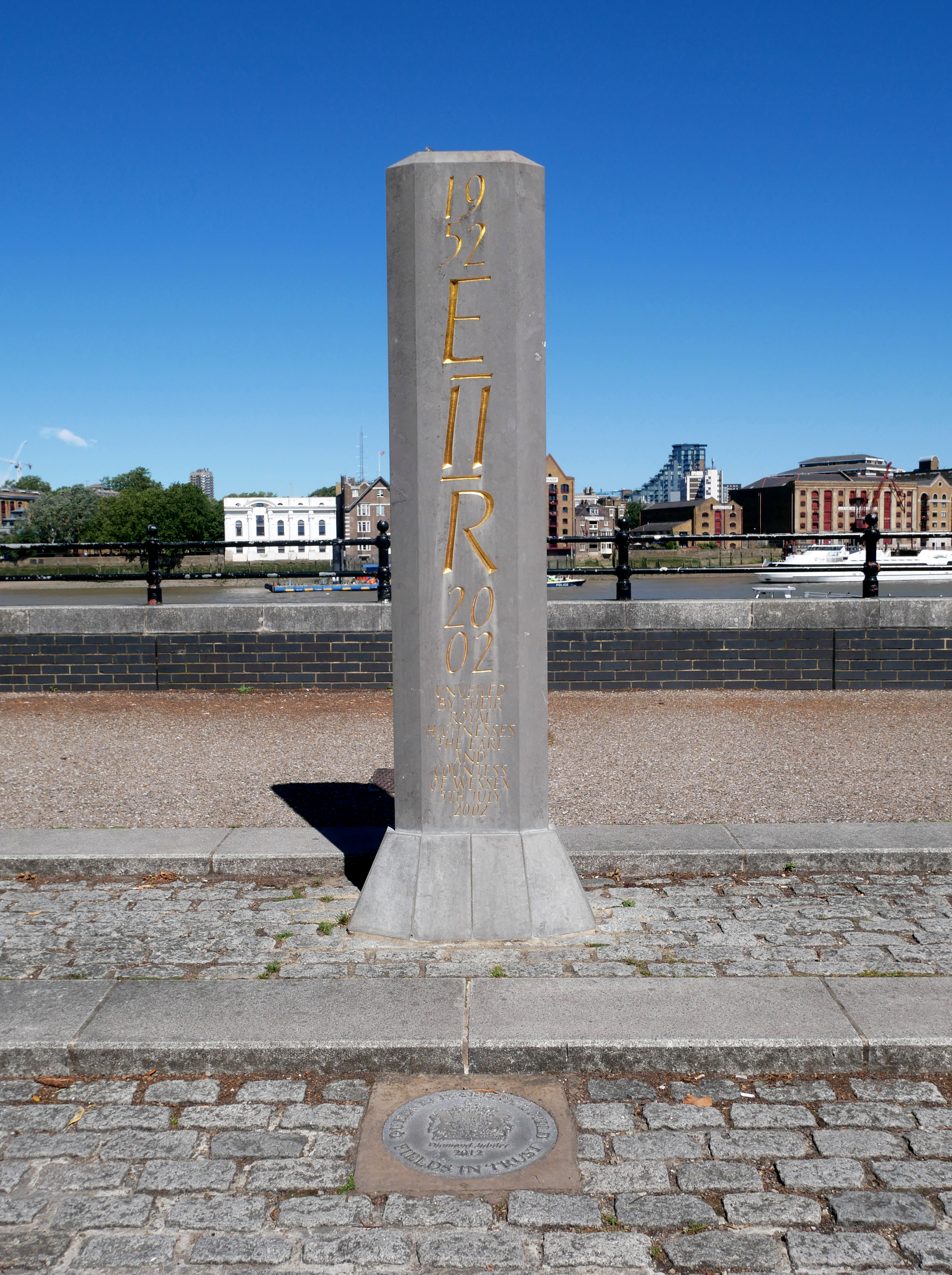
Memorial marker for Queen Elizabeth II's Golden Jubilee in 2002

For the Silver Jubilee of the reign of Queen Elizabeth II in 1977, a memorial stone was unveiled by Her Majesty on the banks of the River Thames in King's Stairs Gardens. To coincide with the summer 2002 restoration works in nearby Southwark Park and to commemorate the Golden Jubilee, a new memorial stone was unveiled in King's Stairs Gardens by the Earl and Countess of Wessex. The Earl and Countess returned in 2012, on the occasion of the Queen’s Diamond Jubilee, to unveil an additional inscription.

== Conservation and Thames Water plans ==
Thames Water named the park in September 2010 as one possible site for works as part of the planned construction of the Thames Tideway Tunnel, but following a consultation process and a vigorous local campaign ("the Save King's Stairs Gardens Campaign), Thames Water decided against using the site, choosing Chambers Wharf instead.

The park was also given village green status in March 2012 by the London Borough of Southwark under the Commons Act 2006, a move which reduced the likelihood of any future such threat.

In 2013, Fields in Trust gained protection.

Together with the nearby King Edward III manor house, the park forms part of Southwark Council's Edward III's Rotherhithe Conservation Area.
