= Southampton City Council elections =

Local government elections in Hampshire, England

Southampton City Council elections are held three out of every four years to elect members of Southampton City Council, the local authority for the city of Southampton in Hampshire, England. Since 1 April 1997 Southampton has been a unitary authority responsible for all local government functions; prior to this it was a non-metropolitan district beneath Hampshire County Council.

== Council composition ==
Composition of the council
Year	Labour	Conservative	Liberal Democrats (Note: Includes totals for the predecessors of the Liberal Democrats, the Liberal Party and SDP (both of which participated in the Alliance).)	Reform	Green	Independents & Others	Council control after election
Local government reorganisation; council established (51 seats)
1973	31	20	0	0	0	0	Labour
1976	46	5	0	0	0	0	Conservative
New ward boundaries (51 seats)
1979	16	29	0	0	0	0	Conservative
1980	18	27	0	0	0	0	Conservative
1982	19	25	1	0	0	0	Conservative
1983	21	23	1	0	0	0	Conservative
1984	23	20	2	0	0	0	Labour
1986	26	15	4	0	0	0	Labour
1987	21	19	4	0	0	1	No overall control
1988	24	17	4	0	0	0	Labour
1990	25	15	4	0	0	1	Labour
1991	31	9	5	0	0	0	Labour
1992	30	9	6	0	0	0	Labour
1994	23	8	14	0	0	0	Labour
1995	26	6	13	0	0	0	Labour
1996	29	3	13	0	0	0	Labour
1998	28	3	13	0	0	0	Labour
1999	27	4	14	0	0	0	Labour
2000	22	7	16	0	0	0	No overall control
New ward boundaries (54 seats)
2002	19	11	18	0	0	0	No overall control
2003	16	12	18	0	0	2	No overall control
2004	15	14	19	0	0	0	No overall control
2006	16	16	16	0	0	0	No overall control
2007	18	18	12	0	0	0	No overall control
2008	14	26	8	0	0	0	Conservative
2010	15	28	5	0	0	0	Conservative
2011	19	26	3	0	0	0	Conservative
2012	30	16	2	0	0	0	Labour
2014	28	18	0	0	0	2	Labour
2015	26	20	0	0	0	2	Labour
2016	25	19	0	0	0	4 (Note: 3 Putting People First, 1 Southampton Independents)	Labour
2018	25	19	0	0	0	4	Labour
2019	29	18	0	0	0	0	Labour
2021	23	25	0	0	0	0	Conservative
2022	26	21	1	0	0	0	Labour
New ward boundaries (57 seats)
2023	38	9	3	0	1	0	Labour
2024	36	10	4	0	1	0	Labour
2026	24	6	7	8	6	0	No overall control

== City result maps ==
2002 results map

2003 results map

2004 results map

2006 results map

2007 results map

2008 results map

2010 results map

2011 results map

2012 results map

2014 results map

2015 results map

2016 results map

2018 results map

2019 results map

2021 results map

2022 results map

2023 results map

2024 results map

2026 results map

== By-election results ==
=== 1994–1998 ===
Bargate By-Election 23 October 1997
Party	Candidate	Votes	%	±%
Labour		885	52.6	−6.4
Conservative		259	15.4	−3.0
Socialist Labour		257	15.3	+9.3
Liberal Democrats		250	14.9	+4.7
Independent Labour		31	1.8	−4.7
Majority		626	37.2	
Turnout		1,682	13.0	
Labour hold		Swing		

Woolston By-Election 12 March 1998
Party	Candidate	Votes	%	±%
Labour		975	47.8	−9.4
Liberal Democrats		725	35.6	+6.1
Conservative		339	16.6	+3.3
Majority		250	12.2	
Turnout		2,039	17.9	
Labour hold		Swing		

=== 1998–2002 ===
Bassett By-Election 8 October 1998
Party	Candidate	Votes	%	±%
Conservative		1,025	58.9	+8.9
Labour		372	21.4	−16.2
Liberal Democrats		344	19.8	+7.5
Majority		653	37.5	
Turnout		1,741	14.5	
Conservative hold		Swing		

Harefield By-Election 8 October 1998
Party	Candidate	Votes	%	±%
Labour		858	44.1	−6.7
Conservative		856	44.0	+9.3
Liberal Democrats		231	11.9	+3.3
Majority		2	0.1	
Turnout		1,945	19.3	
Labour hold		Swing		

=== 2002–2006 ===
Bitterne Park By-Election 15 September 2005
Party	Candidate	Votes	%	±%
Conservative	Clifford Coombes	984	37.1	+0.4
Labour	Mike Brainsby	791	29.9	+13.1
Liberal Democrats	Anne Work	785	29.6	−4.3
Green	Joseph Cox	89	3.4	+3.4
Majority		193	7.2	
Turnout		2,649		
Conservative gain from Liberal Democrats		Swing		

=== 2010–2014 ===
Woolston By-Election 13 June 2013
Party	Candidate	Votes	%	±%
Labour	Christopher Hammond	864	32.3	−22.8
UKIP	John Sharp	741	27.7	+27.7
Conservative	Alex Houghton	704	26.3	−5.6
TUSC	Sue Atkins	136	5.1	+0.4
Liberal Democrats	Adrian Ford	120	4.5	−3.8
Green	Christopher Bluemel	107	4.0	+4.0
Majority		123	4.6	
Turnout		2,672		
Labour hold		Swing		

=== 2014–2018 ===
Coxford By-Election 14 March 2019
Party	Candidate	Votes	%	±%
Labour	Matthew Raynard	668	26.2	−2.0
Conservative	Charles Perez-Storey	529	20.7	+4.3
Liberal Democrats	Josh Smith	450	17.6	+14.7
Socialist	Susan Anne Atkins	368	14.4	+14.4
Integrity Southampton	David John Fletcher	178	7.0	+7.0
Independent	Richard Terrence McQuillan	174	6.8	+4.4
UKIP	Derek Lascelles Humber	123	4.8	+4.8
Green	Cara Anne Sandys	53	2.1	−0.9
Majority		139	5.4	
Turnout		2,551	25.0	−7.7
Labour gain from Independent		Swing		

=== 2022–2026 ===
Bitterne By-Election 1 December 2022
Party	Candidate	Votes	%	±%
Labour	Yvonne Frampton	806	46.0	+4.6
Conservative	Callum Ford	793	45.3	−1.8
Green	Ronald Meldrum	66	3.8	−1.5
Liberal Democrats	Nick McGeorge	61	3.5	−0.9
TUSC	Mabel Wellman	26	1.5	−0.3
Majority		13	0.7	
Turnout		1,752		
Labour gain from Conservative		Swing		

Shirley By-Election 10 October 2024
Party	Candidate	Votes	%	±%
Liberal Democrats	George Percival	1,249	39.2	+19.3
Conservative	Andrew Hetherton	770	24.2	−1.1
Labour	Victoria Ugwoeme	764	24.0	−15.5
Green	Barrie Margetts	241	7.6	+0.5
Independent	Andrew Pope	117	3.7	+3.7
TUSC	Maggie Fricker	44	1.4	−0.1
Majority		479	15.0	
Turnout		3,185		
Liberal Democrats gain from Labour		Swing		

Shirley By-Election 26 February 2026
Party	Candidate	Votes	%	±%
Liberal Democrats	Chris Shank	975	27.2	−12.0
Labour	James Clark	954	26.6	+2.6
Reform	Paul Chancer	681	19.0	0.0
Green	Joanne Clements	539	15.1	+7.5
Conservative	Andy Palmer	288	8.0	−16.2
Ind. Network	Andrew Pope	122	3.4	−0.3
TUSC	David Cowley	16	0.4	−1.0
Majority		21	0.6	
Turnout		3,581		
Liberal Democrats hold		Swing	{{{swing}}}	

== See also ==
Non-metropolitan district elections

- 1979 Southampton City Council election (New ward boundaries & city boundary changes also took place)

Unitary authority elections

- 1998 Southampton City Council election
- 1999 Southampton City Council election
- 2000 Southampton City Council election
- 2002 Southampton City Council election (New ward boundaries increased the number of seats by 3)
- 2003 Southampton City Council election
- 2004 Southampton City Council election
- 2006 Southampton City Council election
- 2007 Southampton City Council election
- 2008 Southampton City Council election
- 2010 Southampton City Council election
- 2012 Southampton City Council election
- 2014 Southampton City Council election
- 2015 Southampton City Council election
- 2016 Southampton City Council election
- 2018 Southampton City Council election
- 2019 Southampton City Council election
- 2021 Southampton City Council election
- 2022 Southampton City Council election
- 2023 Southampton City Council election (New ward boundaries increased the number of seats by 3)
- 2024 Southampton City Council election
- 2026 Southampton City Council election
