= 2000 Southampton City Council election =

2000 UK local government election

The 2000 Southampton Council election took place on 4 May 2000 to elect members of Southampton Unitary Council in Hampshire, England. One third of the council was up for election and the Labour Party lost overall control of the council to no overall control.

After the election, the composition of the council was:

- Labour 22
- Liberal Democrat 16
- Conservative 7

== Election result ==
The results saw Labour lose their majority on the council for the first time in 13 years after both the Conservatives and Liberal Democrats made gains. The Conservatives gained the seats of Harefield, Shirley and St Lukes from Labour, with the winner in St Lukes, Stephen Day, becoming the youngest councillor at the age of 22. Among the defeated Labour councillors was the former leader of the council, Richard Bates, in Shirley, while the then leader of the council June Bridle only held her seat in Sholing by 59 votes. Meanwhile, the Liberal Democrats gained in Coxford and Woolston, the latter by 33 votes over Labour. The overall turnout in the election was 25%, with the lowest being 17.2% in Bargate ward.

Southampton local election result 2000
Party	Seats	Gains	Losses	Net gain/loss	Seats %	Votes %	Votes	+/−
Liberal Democrats	6	2	0	+2	40.0	30.8	13,154	+1.6%
Labour	5	0	5	-5	33.3	31.6	13,521	-8.6%
Conservative	4	3	0	+3	26.7	31.9	13,632	+8.3%
Independent	0	0	0	0	0	3.0	1,276	-1.0%
Green	0	0	0	0	0	2.4	1,037	+0.5%
UKIP	0	0	0	0	0	0.2	90	+0.2%
Independent People's Party	0	0	0	0	0	0.1	36	+0.1%

== Ward results ==
Bargate
Party	Candidate	Votes	%	±%
Labour	John Arnold	1,109	52.2	+4.3
Conservative	Michael Ball	477	22.4	+5.9
Independent	Siobhan Ryan	267	12.6	−1.4
Liberal Democrats	Roger Blades	237	11.1	+0.8
Independent People's Party	Hugo Lamb-Hickman	36	1.7	+1.7
Majority		632	29.7	−1.7
Turnout		2,126	17.2	−1.8
Labour hold		Swing		

Bassett
Party	Candidate	Votes	%	±%
Conservative	David Abraham	2,228	45.0	−7.7
Liberal Democrats	Terence Holden-Brown	1,578	31.9	+15.5
Labour	Phillip Galvin	888	17.9	−13.0
Green	Adam Boardman	168	3.4	+3.4
UKIP	Kim Rose	90	1.8	+1.8
Majority		650	13.1	−8.6
Turnout		4,952	42.0	+18.0
Conservative hold		Swing		

Bitterne
Party	Candidate	Votes	%	±%
Labour	Christine Kelly	1,026	43.1	−10.7
Conservative	Matthew Dean	1,007	42.3	+11.2
Liberal Democrats	Norman Kingswell	348	14.6	−0.5
Majority		19	0.8	−21.9
Turnout		2,381	26.2	−0.9
Labour hold		Swing		

Bitterne Park
Party	Candidate	Votes	%	±%
Liberal Democrats	Sharon Mintoff	1,398	45.2	−5.3
Independent	Peter Baillie	833	26.9	−1.1
Conservative	Christopher Murphy	451	14.6	+6.6
Labour	Derek Parsons	410	13.3	−0.2
Majority		565	18.3	−4.2
Turnout		3,092	26.9	−4.8
Liberal Democrats hold		Swing		

Coxford
Party	Candidate	Votes	%	±%
Liberal Democrats	Harry Mitchell	1,640	55.6	+9.7
Labour	Ceren Davis	878	29.8	−14.4
Conservative	Eva Jeffery	429	14.6	+4.7
Majority		762	25.9	+24.1
Turnout		2,947	25.6	−3.6
Liberal Democrats gain from Labour		Swing		

Freemantle
Party	Candidate	Votes	%	±%
Labour	Stephen Barnes-Andrews	1,046	42.5	−9.1
Conservative	Jeremy Moulton	834	33.9	+6.5
Liberal Democrats	Tom Lawrence	329	13.4	−0.1
Green	John Spottiswoode	254	10.3	+2.8
Majority		212	8.6	−15.6
Turnout		2,463	19.9	−4.2
Labour hold		Swing		

Harefield
Party	Candidate	Votes	%	±%
Conservative	Royston Smith	1,630	57.5	+14.2
Labour	Ian Blackburn	841	29.7	−13.8
Liberal Democrats	Robert Naish	276	9.7	−1.0
Green	Andrew Shaw	88	3.1	+0.6
Majority		789	27.8	
Turnout		2,835	28.5	−2.7
Conservative gain from Labour		Swing		

Millbrook
Party	Candidate	Votes	%	±%
Liberal Democrats	Peter Wakeford	1,541	61.7	+7.6
Labour	Eileen Sharp	536	21.5	−10.4
Conservative	Terry Withington	419	16.8	+2.8
Majority		1,005	40.3	+18.1
Turnout		2,496	25.4	−1.3
Liberal Democrats hold		Swing		

Peartree
Party	Candidate	Votes	%	±%
Liberal Democrats	Gerry Drake	1,506	54.4	+7.8
Conservative	Brian Lankford	718	25.9	+16.1
Labour	John Truscott	545	19.7	−14.7
Majority		788	28.5	+16.3
Turnout		2,769	26.1	−5.8
Liberal Democrats hold		Swing		

Portswood
Party	Candidate	Votes	%	±%
Liberal Democrats	Calvin Horner	1,333	45.4	−10.4
Conservative	Edward Daunt	622	21.2	+7.1
Labour	Jayne Laysan	617	21.0	−2.5
Green	Ben Synnock	190	6.5	−0.1
Independent	Anthony Summers	176	6.0	+6.0
Majority		711	24.2	−8.2
Turnout		2,938	27.0	−1.3
Liberal Democrats hold		Swing		

Redbridge
Party	Candidate	Votes	%	±%
Labour	Catherine McEwing	1,027	50.0	−13.7
Conservative	Julian Isaacson	618	30.1	+11.2
Liberal Democrats	Edward Blake	408	19.9	+2.5
Majority		409	19.9	−24.9
Turnout		2,053	23.2	+1.4
Labour hold		Swing		

Shirley
Party	Candidate	Votes	%	±%
Conservative	Paulette Holt	1,434	43.4	+5.8
Labour	Richard Bates	1,232	37.3	−7.0
Liberal Democrats	Barbara Cummins	482	14.6	+1.1
Green	Peter Davis	155	4.7	+0.2
Majority		202	6.1	
Turnout		3,303	33.8	+1.7
Conservative gain from Labour		Swing		

Sholing
Party	Candidate	Votes	%	±%
Labour	June Bridle	1,193	42.5	−15.5
Conservative	Philip Lankford	1,134	40.4	+11.8
Liberal Democrats	Maureen Kirkwood	481	17.1	+3.7
Majority		59	2.1	−27.3
Turnout		2,808	23.8	−2.5
Labour hold		Swing		

St. Lukes
Party	Candidate	Votes	%	±%
Conservative	Stephen Day	1,141	41.8	+8.8
Labour	Parvin Damani	1,008	36.9	+7.2
Liberal Democrats	Nigel Impey	399	14.6	−5.2
Green	David Cromwell	182	6.7	−1.2
Majority		133	4.9	+1.6
Turnout		2,730	24.0	−0.7
Conservative gain from Labour		Swing		

Woolston
Party	Candidate	Votes	%	±%
Liberal Democrats	David Simpson	1,198	42.0	+4.2
Labour	Carol Cunio	1,165	40.8	−7.6
Conservative	Marlene Unwin	490	17.2	+3.4
Majority		33	1.2	
Turnout		2,853	24.9	+0.4
Liberal Democrats gain from Labour		Swing		

Preceded by 1999 Southampton Council election	Southampton local elections	Succeeded by 2002 Southampton Council election
