= 1998 Southampton City Council election =

1998 UK local government election

The 1998 Southampton Council election took place on 7 May 1998 to elect members of Southampton Unitary Council in Hampshire, England. One third of the council was up for election and the Labour Party stayed in overall control of the council.

After the election, the composition of the council was:

- Labour 28
- Liberal Democrat 14
- Conservative 3

== Election result ==
Southampton local election result 1998
Party	Seats	Gains	Losses	Net gain/loss	Seats %	Votes %	Votes	+/−
Labour	9			-1	60.0	44.3	18,612	
Liberal Democrats	5			+1	33.3	29.2	12,272	
Conservative	1			0	6.7	22.1	9,269	
Independent	0	0	0	0	0.0	2.2	926	
Independent Labour	0	0	0	0	0.0	1.1	458	
Green	0	0	0	0	0.0	0.9	397	
Socialist Alternative	0	0	0	0	0.0	0.2	91	

== Ward results ==
Bargate
Party	Candidate	Votes	%	±%
Labour	Jacqueline Rayment	1,171	55.1	
Conservative	Clifford Combes	414	19.5	
Independent Labour	Kim Rose	237	11.1	
Liberal Democrats	Nigel Impey	214	10.1	
Socialist Alternative	Nicholas Chaffey	91	4.3	
Majority		757	35.6	
Turnout		2,127		

Bassett
Party	Candidate	Votes	%	±%
Conservative	John Hannides	1,601	49.6	
Labour	Christine Medway	1,230	38.1	
Liberal Democrats	Terence Holden-Brown	394	12.2	
Majority		371	11.5	
Turnout		3,225		

Bitterne
Party	Candidate	Votes	%	±%
Labour	Penelope Baldwin	1,411	61.2	
Conservative	Keith Worthy	583	25.3	
Liberal Democrats	Edward Blake	311	13.5	
Majority		828	35.9	
Turnout		2,305		

Bitterne Park
Party	Candidate	Votes	%	±%
Liberal Democrats	Ann Milton	1,638	46.9	
Independent	Royston Smith	926	26.5	
Labour	Brian Hilton	597	17.1	
Conservative	Roger Burra	333	9.5	
Majority		712	20.4	
Turnout		3,494		

Coxford
Party	Candidate	Votes	%	±%
Liberal Democrats	Michael Gausden	1,539	48.0	
Labour	Matthew Stevens	1,311	40.9	
Conservative	William Reynard	356	11.1	
Majority		228	7.1	
Turnout		3,206		

Freemantle
Party	Candidate	Votes	%	±%
Labour	John Noon	1,302	52.8	
Conservative	Brian Parnell	692	28.1	
Liberal Democrats	Natalie Murphy	356	14.4	
Green	John Spottiswoode	117	4.7	
Majority		610	24.7	
Turnout		2,467		

Harefield
Party	Candidate	Votes	%	±%
Labour	David Hill	1,573	51.6	
Conservative	John Hartwell	1,041	34.2	
Liberal Democrats	Robert Naish	258	8.5	
Independent Labour	Graham Cotton	111	3.6	
Green	Andrew Shaw	64	2.1	
Majority		532	17.5	
Turnout		3,047		

Millbrook
Party	Candidate	Votes	%	±%
Liberal Democrats	Virginia Moore	1,599	56.8	
Labour	John Merritt	870	30.9	
Conservative	Eva Jeffery	348	12.4	
Majority		729	25.9	
Turnout		2,817		

Peartree
Party	Candidate	Votes	%	±%
Liberal Democrats	John Slade	1,775	54.5	
Labour	John Truscott	1,153	35.4	
Conservative	Brian Lankford	330	10.1	
Majority		622	19.1	
Turnout		3,258		

Portswood
Party	Candidate	Votes	%	±%
Liberal Democrats	Adrian Vinson	1,713	57.8	
Labour	Kenneth Street	852	28.7	
Conservative	Michael Ball	399	13.5	
Majority		861	29.0	
Turnout		2,964		

Redbridge
Party	Candidate	Votes	%	±%
Labour	Peter Jenks	1,507	67.4	
Liberal Democrats	Phillip Lloyd	366	16.4	
Conservative	Julian Isaacson	362	16.2	
Majority		1,141	51.1	
Turnout		2,235		

Shirley
Party	Candidate	Votes	%	±%
Labour	Eric Pointer	1,295	43.1	
Conservative	Alec Samuels	1,074	35.8	
Liberal Democrats	Ronald Fitzgerald	530	17.7	
Green	Paul Garratt	103	3.4	
Majority		221	7.4	
Turnout		3,002		

Sholing
Party	Candidate	Votes	%	±%
Labour	Heather Corless	1,816	59.0	
Conservative	Phillip Lankford	833	27.1	
Liberal Democrats	David Heather	429	13.9	
Majority		983	31.9	
Turnout		3,078		

St. Lukes
Party	Candidate	Votes	%	±%
Labour	Paul Jenks	983	46.0	
Conservative	Thomas Paterson	580	27.2	
Liberal Democrats	Calvin Horner	349	16.3	
Green	Peter Davis	113	5.3	
Independent Labour	Peter Baillie	110	5.2	
Majority		403	18.9	
Turnout		2,135		

Woolston
Party	Candidate	Votes	%	±%
Labour	Richard Williams	1,541	57.8	
Liberal Democrats	David Simpson	801	30.1	
Conservative	Marlene Unwin	323	12.1	
Majority		740	27.8	
Turnout		2,665		

Preceded by 1996 Southampton Council election	Southampton local elections	Succeeded by 1999 Southampton Council election
