= 2015 Southampton City Council election =

2015 UK local government election

← 2014	7 May 2015	2016 →

A third of seats to Southampton City Council 23 seats needed for a majority
	First party	Second party	Third party
Party	Labour	Conservative	Independent
Seats won	12	8	1
Seats after	26	20	2
Seat change	▼2	▲2	▲1
Popular vote	35,085	34,928	2,498
Percentage	34.2%	34.1%	2.4%
Swing	▼7.1%	▼3.6%	▲1.6%
- Map showing the election results. Each ward represents 1 seat
Majority party before election
Labour
Majority party after election
Labour

Composition of the whole Southampton City Council after the 2015 elections. Labour in red, Conservatives in blue, and Councillors Against Cuts in dark red.

The 2015 Southampton City Council election took place on 7 May 2015 to elect members of Southampton City Council in England. This was on the same day as other local elections.

After the election, the composition of the council was:

- Labour 26 (-2)
- Conservative 20 (+2)
- Councillors Against Cuts 2

Just one week after the election, newly re-elected Labour councillor for Redbridge, Andrew Pope, who had represented the area since 2011, left Labour to sit as an independent, citing concerns he had with the leader of the council, Simon Letts, who he accused of "putting his own position ahead of the people of Southampton" and of lacking "vision and strong leadership".

== Election result ==
Southampton Council is elected in thirds, which means all comparisons are to the corresponding 2011 Southampton Council election.

Southampton local election result 2015
Party	Seats	Gains	Losses	Net gain/loss	Seats %	Votes %	Votes	+/−
Conservative	8	2	0	▲2	50.0	34.1	34,928	▼3.6
Labour	7	0	3	▼2	43.8	34.2	35,085	▼7.1
Independent	1	1	0	▲1	6.3	2.4	2,498	▲1.6
UKIP	0	0	0	Steady	0.0	12.4	12,728	New
Green	0	0	0	Steady	0.0	8.6	8,786	▲6.2
Liberal Democrats	0	0	0	Steady	0.0	7.2	7,414	▼6.6
TUSC	0	0	0	Steady	0.0	1.0	1,021	▼1.9

Comparison to local election result 2014
Party	Votes %	+/-
Labour	34.2	▼0.1
Conservative	34.1	▲3.0
UKIP	12.4	▼2.7
Green	8.6	▲3.2
Liberal Democrats	7.2	▼0.8
Independent	2.4	▼1.1
TUSC	1.0	▼1.8

== Ward results ==
Bargate
Party	Candidate	Votes	%
Labour	John Noon	2,690	42.5
Conservative	Spencer Bowman	2,223	35.1
Green	Joe Cox	927	14.6
Liberal Democrats	Vijay Tondepu	317	5.0
TUSC	Andrew Howe	119	1.9
Majority		467	7.4
Turnout		6,336	52.01
Labour hold			

Bassett
Party	Candidate	Votes	%
Conservative	Les Harris	3,136	46.0
Labour	Renata Bogus	1,575	23.1
Liberal Democrats	David Whalley	766	11.2
UKIP	Jean Romsey	649	9.5
Green	Cara Sandys	607	8.9
TUSC	Neil Kelly	53	0.8
Majority		1,561	22.9
Turnout		6,817	65.55
Conservative hold			

Bevois
Party	Candidate	Votes	%
Labour	Jacqui Rayment	3,338	54.5
Conservative	Calvin Smith	1,112	18.2
Green	Rosie Pearce	829	13.5
Liberal Democrats	Adrian Ford	412	6.7
UKIP	Richard Lyons	308	5.0
TUSC	Glyn Oliver	90	1.5
Majority		2,226	36.3
Turnout		6,122	54.91
Labour hold			

Bitterne
Party	Candidate	Votes	%
Labour	John Jordan	2,343	40.0
Conservative	Marley Guthrie	1,935	33.0
UKIP	Thomas Collier	1,043	17.8
Green	Jodie Coperland	254	4.3
Liberal Democrats	Robert Naish	240	4.1
TUSC	Declan Clune	41	0.7
Majority		408	7.0
Turnout		5,863	55.91
Labour hold			

Bitterne Park
Party	Candidate	Votes	%
Conservative	David Fuller	2,805	39.5
Labour	Andrew Godsell	2,116	29.8
UKIP	Richard Jay	901	12.7
Green	Lindsi Bluemel	625	8.8
Liberal Democrats	James Read	567	8.0
TUSC	Linda Boulton	59	0.8
Majority		689	9.7
Turnout		7,105	65.26
Conservative hold			

Coxford
Party	Candidate	Votes	%
Independent	Don Thomas	2,300	36.7
Labour	Daniel Lucas	1,330	21.2
Conservative	Trevor Glasspool	1,196	19.1
UKIP	Joe Lockyer	978	15.6
Liberal Democrats	Victoria Galton	215	3.4
Green	Claire Huckle	209	3.3
Majority		970	15.5
Turnout		6,268	58.71
Independent gain from Labour			

Freemantle
Party	Candidate	Votes	%
Conservative	Brian Parnell	2,335	35.3
Labour	Pat Usher	2,246	34.0
Green	Jonathan Martin	831	12.6
UKIP	Chris Green	638	9.7
Liberal Democrats	Steven Hulbert	453	6.9
TUSC	Mike Marx	73	1.1
Majority		89	1.3
Turnout		6,608	60.69
Conservative hold			

Harefield
Party	Candidate	Votes	%
Conservative	Daniel Fitzhenry	2,884	44.0
Labour	Izaak Wilson	1,955	29.8
UKIP	Vincent Avellino	1,030	15.7
Liberal Democrats	John Dennis	322	4.9
Green	Peter Pashen	288	4.4
TUSC	Graham O'Reilly	59	0.9
Majority		929	14.2
Turnout		6,561	62.04
Conservative hold			

Millbrook
Party	Candidate	Votes	%
Labour	David Furnell	2,345	35.4
Conservative	Matt Turpin	2,170	32.7
UKIP	Pearline Hingston	1,097	16.5
Green	Daniel Payne	439	6.6
Liberal Democrats	Paul Clarke	415	6.3
	Stephen Plumridge	95	1.4
TUSC	David Rawlinson	43	0.6
Majority		175	2.7
Turnout		6,631	58.70
Labour hold			

Peartree
Party	Candidate	Votes	%
Conservative	Alex Houghton	2,573	38.1
Labour	Darren Paffey	2,188	32.4
UKIP	David Nightingale	1,027	15.2
Liberal Democrats	Eileen Bowers	471	7.0
Green	Gemma Mathieson	425	6.3
TUSC	Graham Henry	38	0.6
Majority		385	5.7
Turnout		6,747	62.87
Conservative gain from Labour			

Portswood
Party	Candidate	Votes	%
Conservative	Matthew Claisse	2,200	31.8
Labour	Lucas Szlek	1,951	28.2
Liberal Democrats	Adrian Vinson	1,390	20.1
Green	Chris Bluemel	1,205	17.4
TUSC	Nick Chaffey	118	1.7
Majority		249	3.6
Turnout		6,908	63.18
Conservative hold			

Redbridge
Party	Candidate	Votes	%
Labour Co-op	Andrew Pope	2,186	37.9
Conservative	Richard Palmer	1,539	26.7
UKIP	Colin Hingston	1,439	24.9
Green	Chris James	263	4.6
Liberal Democrats	Simon Stokes	250	4.3
TUSC	Kieran Wilson	69	1.2
Majority		647	11.2
Turnout		5,773	52.83
Labour Co-op hold			

Shirley
Party	Candidate	Votes	%
Labour	Satvir Kaur	2,501	35.9
Conservative	Chris Grace	2,426	34.8
UKIP	Nick Ray	711	10.2
Green	John Spottiswoode	646	9.3
Liberal Democrats	Peter Galton	471	6.8
Independent	Ricky Lambert	103	1.5
TUSC	Tara Bosworth	58	0.8
Majority		75	1.1
Turnout		6,964	64.71
Labour hold			

Sholing
Party	Candidate	Votes	%
Conservative	Graham Wilkinson	2,947	41.6
Labour	Sue Blatchford	2,291	32.3
UKIP	Dean Bartram	1,175	16.6
Green	Martyn Webb	304	4.3
Liberal Democrats	Graham Galton	288	4.1
TUSC	Darren Galpin	29	0.4
Majority		656	9.3
Turnout		7,086	64.56
Conservative gain from Labour			

Swaythling
Party	Candidate	Votes	%
Conservative	Spiros Vassiliou	1,633	31.4
Labour	Frances Murphy	1,592	30.6
UKIP	Alan Kebbell	738	14.2
Green	Angela Cotton	627	12.1
Liberal Democrats	Jules Poulain	513	9.9
TUSC	Kevin Kayes	80	1.5
Majority		41	0.8
Turnout		5,201	57.53
Conservative hold			

Woolston
Party	Candidate	Votes	%
Labour	Warwick Payne	2,438	40.7
Conservative	Albert Leach	1,814	30.3
UKIP	Derek Humber	994	16.6
Liberal Democrats	Colin Bleach	324	5.4
Green	Katherine Barbour	307	5.1
TUSC	Sue Atkins	92	1.5
Majority		624	10.4
Turnout		5,988	57.79
Labour hold			

Preceded by 2014 Southampton City Council election	Southampton City Council elections	Succeeded by 2016 Southampton City Council election
