= 2026 Southampton City Council election =

2026 English local government election

- 7 May 2026

17 out of 51 seats to Southampton City Council 26 seats needed for a majority
- Registered: 163,032
- Turnout: 59,940; 36.8%
	First party	Second party	Third party
Leader	Alex Winning (defeated)		Richard Blackman
Party	Labour	Reform	Liberal Democrats
Last election	36 seats, 39.9%	0 seats, 3.6%	4 seats, 12.7%
Seats before	32	1	7
Seats won	2	8	3
Seats after	24	8	7
Seat change	▼8	▲7	Steady
Popular vote	12,709	15,351	8,447
Percentage	21.3%	25.7%	14.1%
Swing	▼18.6%	▲22.1%	▲1.4%
	Fourth party	Fifth party
Leader		Peter Baillie
Party	Green	Conservative
Last election	1 seat, 9.2%	10 seats, 29.7%
Seats before	2	9
Seats won	4	0
Seats after	6	6
Seat change	▲4	▼3
Popular vote	11,750	10,013
Percentage	19.7%	16.7%
Swing	▲10.5%	▼13.0%
- Winner of each seat at the 2026 Southampton City Council election.
Leader before election
Alex Winning
Labour
Leader after election
Sarah Bogle
Labour
No overall control (Note: Labour minority)

The 2026 Southampton City Council election was held on 7 May 2026, alongside the other local elections across the United Kingdom being held on the same day, to elect 17 of 51 members of Southampton City Council.

Prior to the election, the council was under Labour majority control. The council went under no overall control at this election. Labour remained the largest party but lost a number of seats, including that of the leader of the council, Alex Winning. They were left with 24 seats, two short of a majority. After the election, Labour chose Sarah Bogle to be their new group leader. She was formally appointed as the new leader of the council at the subsequent annual council meeting on 20 May 2026, leading a Labour minority administration.

Due to ongoing local government reorganisation, this will be the final election to Southampton City Council before it is abolished and replaced by a successor unitary authority. Elections to the successor authority are due to take place in 2027.

== Council composition ==
After 2024 election		Before 2026 election	
Party	Seats	Party	Seats
Labour	36	Labour	31
Conservative	10	Conservative	9
Liberal Democrats	4	Liberal Democrats	7
Green	1	Green	2
Reform	0	Reform	1
Independent	0	Independent	1

Changes 2024–2026:

- August 2024: Satvir Kaur (Labour) resigns – by-election held October 2024
- October 2024: George Percival (Liberal Democrats) gains by-election from Labour
- March 2025: Matt Renyard (Labour) joins Greens
- June 2025: Matthew Bunday (Labour) joins Liberal Democrats
- August 2025: Rebecca McCreanor (Labour) joins Liberal Democrats
- January 2026: George Percival (Liberal Democrats) resigns – by-election held February 2026
- February 2026:
  - Sarah Powell-Vaughan (Conservatives) joins Reform
  - Chris Shank (Liberal Democrats) wins by-election
  - Lee Whitbread (Labour) suspended from party

== Summary ==
=== Background ===
In 2024, Labour retained control of the council.

=== Election result ===
2026 Southampton City Council election
Party	This election				Full council			This election		
Party	Candidates	Seats	Net	Seats %	Other	Total	Total %	Votes	Votes %	+/−
Labour	{{{candidates}}}	2	▼8	11.8	22	24	47.1	12,709	21.3	–18.6
Reform	{{{candidates}}}	8	▲7	47.1	0	8	15.7	15,351	25.7	+22.1
Liberal Democrats	{{{candidates}}}	3	Steady	17.6	4	7	13.7	8,447	14.1	+1.4
Green	{{{candidates}}}	4	▲4	23.5	2	6	11.8	11,750	19.7	+10.5
Conservative	{{{candidates}}}	0	▼3	0.0	6	6	11.8	10,013	16.7	–13.0
TUSC	{{{candidates}}}	0	Steady	0.0	0	0	0.0	1,070	1.8	–2.2
Ind. Network	{{{candidates}}}	0	Steady	0.0	0	0	0.0	365	0.6	N/A
Independent	{{{candidates}}}	0	Steady	0.0	0	0	0.0	84	0.1	N/A

== Incumbents ==
Ward	Incumbent councillor	Party	Re-standing
Banister & Polygon	Steve Leggett	Labour	Yes
Bargate	John Noon	Labour	Yes
Bassett	Sam Chapman	Liberal Democrats	Yes
Bevois	Mike Denness	Labour	No
Bitterne Park	Phil Webb	Labour	Yes
Coxford	Rebecca McCreanor	Liberal Democrats	No
Freemantle	Pam Kenny	Labour	Yes
Harefield	Valerie Laurent	Conservative	No
Millbrook	Jeremy Moulton	Conservative	Yes
Peartree	Alex Houghton	Conservative	Yes
Portswood	Marie Finn	Labour	Yes
Redbridge	Lee Whitbread	Labour	No
Shirley	Alexander Winning	Labour	Yes
Sholing	Sarah Powell-Vaughan (Note: Originally elected as Conservative, but defected to Reform in February 2026.)	Reform	Yes
Swaythling	Matthew Bunday (Note: Originally elected as Labour, but defected to the Liberal Democrats in June 2025.)	Liberal Democrats	No
Thornhill	Andy Frampton	Labour	Yes
Woolston	Sue Blatchford	Labour	No

== Ward results ==
=== Banister & Polygon ===
Banister & Polygon
Party	Candidate	Votes	%	±%
Green	Misty Burgess	1,183	38.7	▲23.2
Labour	Steve Leggett*	839	27.4	▼18.6
Reform	Toriola Coker	415	13.6	N/A
Conservative	Sarah Ballie	356	11.6	▼10.8
Liberal Democrats	Reuben Hinchliffe	182	5.9	▼6.0
Independent	John Cooney	84	2.7	N/A
Majority		344	11.3	N/A
Turnout		3068	36.4	▲9.9
Registered electors		8,432		
Green gain from Labour		Swing	▲20.9	

=== Bargate ===
Bargate
Party	Candidate	Votes	%	±%
Green	Luke Reynolds	702	27.9	▲16.8
Labour	John Noon*	665	26.5	▼23.7
Reform	Kevin Masters	501	19.9	N/A
Liberal Democrats	Adrian Ford	354	14.1	▲6.7
Conservative	Ivan White	262	10.4	▼16.2
TUSC	Donna Dee	29	1.2	▼3.4
Majority		37	1.4	N/A
Turnout		2,520	29.7	▲7.5
Registered electors		8,485		
Green gain from Labour		Swing	▲20.3	

=== Bassett ===
Bassett
Party	Candidate	Votes	%	±%
Liberal Democrats	Sam Chapman*	1,596	39.1	−4.8
Conservative	Amanda Guest	919	22.5	−6.1
Reform	Kurosh Shadmand	755	18.5	+12.7
Green	Bobby Grigore	467	11.4	+5.5
Labour Co-op	Robert Wolfe	321	7.9	−6.5
TUSC	Nick Davies	27	0.7	−0.8
Majority		677	16.6	+1.3
Turnout		4,096	43.4	+7.2
Registered electors		9,434		
Liberal Democrats hold		Swing	▲0.7	

=== Bevois ===
Bevois
Party	Candidate	Votes	%	±%
Labour	Paul Kenny	972	31.3	−17.3
TUSC	Nadia Ditta	739	23.8	−8.4
Green	Amy Sefton-Thake	690	22.2	+14.1
Reform	Dennis Steas	274	8.8	N/A
Liberal Democrats	Abdiwali Elmi	233	7.5	+3.6
Conservative	Richard Palmer	194	6.3	−1.0
Majority		233	7.5	−8.9
Turnout		3,102	34.5	+4.1
Registered electors		9,003		
Labour hold		Swing	▼4.5	

=== Bitterne Park ===
Bitterne Park
Party	Candidate	Votes	%	±%
Labour	Phil Webb*	1,290	27.1	−15.7
Conservative	David Fuller	1,132	23.8	−16.6
Reform	Trecious Chitsika	962	20.2	+16.0
Green	Lindsi Bluemel	709	14.9	+6.1
Liberal Democrats	Tony Bunday	646	13.6	+9.9
TUSC	Nick Chaffey	26	0.5	−1.1
Majority		158	3.3	+1.0
Turnout		4,780	45.9	+8.6
Registered electors		10,418		
Labour hold		Swing	▲0.5	

=== Coxford ===
Coxford
Party	Candidate	Votes	%	±%
Reform	Philip Crook	1,416	39.8	+30.8
Conservative	Paul Nolan	673	18.9	−16.7
Labour Co-op	Gwen Gordon	653	18.3	−18.9
Green	Ronald Meldrum	464	13.0	+6.8
Liberal Democrats	Peter Galton	327	9.2	+1.7
TUSC	Maggie Fricker	26	0.7	−0.8
Majority		743	20.9	N/A
Turnout		3,574	35.4	+5.1
Registered electors		10,102		
Reform gain from Liberal Democrats		Swing	▲23.8	

=== Freemantle ===
Freemantle
Party	Candidate	Votes	%	±%
Green	Sam Pryce	1,136	31.1	▲20.9
Labour Co-op	Pam Kenny*	1,060	29.0	▼20.9
Reform	Philip Small	711	19.5	▲13.0
Conservative	Diana Galton	447	12.2	▼9.3
Liberal Democrats	Max Hayman	269	7.4	▼1.3
TUSC	Catherine Clarke	32	0.9	▼2.2
Majority		76	2.1	N/A
Turnout		3,663	38.5	▲10.3
Registered electors		9,527		
Green gain from Labour Co-op		Swing	▲20.9	

=== Harefield ===
Harefield
Party	Candidate	Votes	%	±%
Reform	Richard Piatkiewicz	1,185	33.4	N/A
Conservative	Callum Ford	949	26.7	−16.8
Labour	Daniel Jeffery	613	17.3	−19.0
Green	Christopher Bluemel	489	13.8	+7.5
Liberal Democrats	Martyn Cooper	302	8.5	−2.3
TUSC	Graham Henry	15	0.4	−3.2
Majority		236	6.7	N/A
Turnout		3,557	36.4	+8.2
Registered electors		9,782		
Reform gain from Conservative				

=== Millbrook ===
Millbrook
Party	Candidate	Votes	%	±%
Reform	Ross Mould	869	28.6	N/A
Conservative	Jeremy Moulton*	845	27.8	−12.7
Labour Co-op	Anwar Jawula	607	20.0	−21.6
Green	Richard Fricker	479	15.8	+6.9
Liberal Democrats	Ellen McGeorge	217	7.1	+1.1
TUSC	Andrew Howe	22	0.7	−2.3
Majority		24	0.8	N/A
Turnout		3,046	32.1	+5.3
Registered electors		9,490		
Reform gain from Conservative				

=== Peartree ===
Peartree
Party	Candidate	Votes	%	±%
Reform	Soham Bandyopadhyay	1,354	31.4	+21.8
Conservative	Alex Houghton*	1,265	29.4	−6.4
Labour	Sue Blatchford*	765	17.8	−23.1
Green	Lee Ingram	654	15.2	+8.3
Liberal Democrats	Robert William Naish	252	5.8	+0.1
TUSC	Mike Marx	19	0.4	−0.7
Majority		89	2.0	N/A
Turnout		4,309	40.3	+10.3
Registered electors		10,720		
Reform gain from Conservative		Swing	▲14.1	

=== Portswood ===
Portswood
Party	Candidate	Votes	%	±%
Green	Lori Foster	1,432	38.6	▲9.5
Labour Co-op	Marie Finn*	864	23.3	▼23.0
Liberal Democrats	Matthew Bunday*	718	19.4	▲12.9
Reform	David Chapman	427	11.5	▲7.7
Conservative	Nick Moulton	244	6.6	▼5.5
TUSC	Tony Twine	22	0.6	▼1.6
Majority		568	15.3	N/A
Turnout		3,713	45.0	▲8.5
Registered electors		8,252		
Green gain from Labour Co-op		Swing	▲16.3	

=== Redbridge ===
Redbridge
Party	Candidate	Votes	%	±%
Reform	John Edwards	1,144	40.1	+27.8
Labour	Adrian Pimley	557	19.5	−32.0
Ind. Network	Andrew Pope	365	12.8	N/A
Green	Lisa Fricker	344	12.1	+5.6
Conservative	Dave Smith	290	10.2	−13.0
Liberal Democrats	Simon Stokes	145	5.1	−0.5
TUSC	Pete Wyatt	5	0.2	−0.7
Majority		587	20.6	N/A
Turnout		2,859	29.2	+5.6
Registered electors		9,790		
Reform gain from Labour		Swing	▲29.9	

=== Shirley ===
Shirley
Party	Candidate	Votes	%	±%
Liberal Democrats	Rebecca McCreanor*	1,229	28.6	+8.7
Labour	Alex Winning*	1,088	25.3	−14.2
Green	Joanne Clements	811	18.9	+11.8
Reform	Paul Chance	789	18.4	+11.7
Conservative	Hilary Moulton	380	8.8	−16.5
Majority		141	3.3	N/A
Turnout		4,309	42.2	+6.1
Registered electors		10,217		
Liberal Democrats gain from Labour		Swing	▲11.5	

=== Sholing ===
Sholing
Party	Candidate	Votes	%	±%
Reform	Sarah Powell-Vaughan*	1,434	37.1	N/A
Conservative	Andy Palmer	878	22.7	−23.5
Labour	Charlotte Parkin	563	14.6	−19.3
Green	Neil Kelly	498	12.9	+6.6
Liberal Democrats	Sharon Hopkins	489	12.7	+0.9
Majority		556	14.4	N/A
Turnout		3,873	37.5	+8.5
Registered electors		10,323		
Reform hold				

=== Swaythling ===
Swaythling
Party	Candidate	Votes	%	±%
Liberal Democrats	Jon Walsh	1,029	33.4	−8.7
Green	Angela Cotton	691	22.4	+13.1
Reform	Bruce Robinson	680	22.1	N/A
Labour	Amelia Tamblyn	426	13.8	−16.7
Conservative	Pritheepal Roath	231	7.5	−7.9
TUSC	Fintan Broderick	21	0.7	−2.0
Majority		338	11.0	−0.6
Turnout		3,086	35.3	+4.3
Registered electors		8,738		
Liberal Democrats hold		Swing	▼10.9	

=== Thornhill ===
Thornhill
Party	Candidate	Votes	%	±%
Reform	Tim Kiff-Munds	1,215	41.6	N/A
Labour	Andy Frampton*	627	21.5	−26.4
Conservative	Matt Jones	456	15.6	−22.3
Green	Jodie Copeland	403	13.8	+8.6
Liberal Democrats	Edward Bolton	187	6.4	+0.6
TUSC	Tim Cutter	34	1.2	−2.0
Majority		588	20.1	N/A
Turnout		2,934	29.8	+4.7
Registered electors		9,845		
Reform gain from Labour				

=== Woolston ===
Woolston
Party	Candidate	Votes	%	±%
Reform	Ryan Collett	1,220	35.5	N/A
Labour	Victoria Ugwoeme*	799	23.3	−16.5
Green	Carmel Herrigan	598	17.4	+9.9
Conservative	Scott Davis	492	14.3	−26.9
Liberal Democrats	Francis Hedley	272	7.9	+0.2
TUSC	Sue Atkins	53	1.5	−2.3
Majority		421	12.2	N/A
Turnout		3,442	32.9	+7.5
Registered electors		10,474		
Reform gain from Labour				
