= 2006 Southampton City Council election =

2006 UK local government election

Map of the results of the 2006 Southampton council election. Liberal Democrats in yellow, Labour in red and Conservatives in blue.

The 2006 Southampton Council election took place on 4 May 2006 to elect members of Southampton Unitary Council in Hampshire, England. One third of the council was up for election and the council stayed under no overall control.

After the election, the composition of the council was:

- Liberal Democrat 16
- Labour 16
- Conservative 16

== Campaign ==
Before the election the Liberal Democrats formed the administration of the council with 17 seats, compared to 16 for the Conservatives and 15 for Labour.

Issues in the election included refuse collection, the condition of the pavements and anti-social behaviour. The Labour and Liberal Democrat parties clashed over anti-social behaviour, with the parties disagreeing over whether the Liberal Democrat led council was doing enough to tackle such behaviour. The campaign saw national politicians joining in, such as Labour's Hazel Blears and Liberal Democrat Simon Hughes.

The election also had two independents standing on a platform calling for the chairman of Southampton F.C. Rupert Lowe to resign.

== Election results ==
The results saw all 3 main parties end the election with 16 seats, after Labour gained 1 seat from the Liberal Democrats. Meanwhile, the independents calling for Rupert Lowe to resign as chairman of Southampton F.C. received 200 and 63 votes each. Overall turnout in the election was 31.3%.

Following the election the 3 parties were unable to reach agreement on who should become leader of the council, with a five-hour council meeting on 18 May failing to reach a conclusion. Finally Liberal Democrat Adrian Vinson continued as council leader for another year.

Southampton local election result 2006
| Party | Seats | Gains | Losses | Net gain/loss | Seats % | Votes % | Votes | +/− |
|---|---|---|---|---|---|---|---|---|
| Liberal Democrats | 7 | 0 | 1 | ▼1 | 41.2 | 28.8 | 15,686 | ▼1.6 |
| Labour | 6 | 1 | 0 | ▲1 | 35.3 | 29.8 | 16,256 | ▲0.9 |
| Conservative | 4 | 0 | 0 | Steady | 23.5 | 32.5 | 17,733 | ▲1.9 |
| Green | 0 | 0 | 0 | Steady | 0.0 | 4.3 | 2,334 | ▲2.8 |
| UKIP | 0 | 0 | 0 | Steady | 0.0 | 1.6 | 887 | ▼4.9 |
| Independent | 0 | 0 | 0 | Steady | 0.0 | 1.4 | 740 | ▲1.4 |
| BNP | 0 | 0 | 0 | Steady | 0.0 | 0.9 | 466 | ▼0.8 |
| Socialist Alternative | 0 | 0 | 0 | Steady | 0.0 | 0.3 | 157 | ▼0.1 |
| Respect | 0 | 0 | 0 | Steady | 0.0 | 0.3 | 144 | ▲0.3 |
| Alliance for Green Socialism | 0 | 0 | 0 | Steady | 0.0 | 0.2 | 95 | ▲0.2 |

== Ward results ==
=== Bargate ===
Bargate
| Party | Candidate | Votes | % | ±% |
|---|---|---|---|---|
| Labour | Sarah Bogle | 861 | 41.1 | +3.1 |
| Conservative | Amy Willacy | 683 | 32.6 | +3.9 |
| Liberal Democrats | Ruth Liskutin | 333 | 15.9 | −5.0 |
| Alliance for Green Socialism | Philip Pope | 95 | 4.5 | +4.5 |
| Independent | Perry McMillan | 63 | 3.0 | +3.0 |
| Independent | Daniel Warren | 58 | 2.8 | +2.8 |
| Majority | | 178 | 8.5 | −0.8 |
| Turnout | | 2,093 | 16.8 | −0.8 |
| Labour hold | | Swing | | |

=== Bassett ===
Bassett
| Party | Candidate | Votes | % | ±% |
|---|---|---|---|---|
| Liberal Democrats | Elizabeth Mizon | 1,979 | 46.6 | +11.6 |
| Conservative | Linda Norris | 1,926 | 45.4 | +1.8 |
| Labour | Robert Blond | 340 | 8.0 | −3.5 |
| Majority | | 53 | 1.2 | |
| Turnout | | 4,245 | 40.7 | +1.9 |
| Liberal Democrats hold | | Swing | | |

=== Bevois ===
Bevois
| Party | Candidate | Votes | % | ±% |
|---|---|---|---|---|
| Labour | Derek Burke | 1,169 | 51.0 | +8.8 |
| Liberal Democrats | Robert Holmes | 526 | 22.9 | −3.0 |
| Conservative | John Whiskerd | 441 | 19.2 | −5.0 |
| Socialist Alternative | Nicholas Chaffey | 157 | 6.8 | −0.9 |
| Majority | | 643 | 28.0 | +11.7 |
| Turnout | | 2,293 | 23.4 | −2.0 |
| Labour hold | | Swing | | |

=== Bitterne ===
Bitterne
| Party | Candidate | Votes | % | ±% |
|---|---|---|---|---|
| Labour | Simon Letts | 1,273 | 41.5 | +1.2 |
| Conservative | Claire Johnson | 849 | 27.7 | −3.6 |
| Liberal Democrats | Robert Naish | 481 | 15.7 | −1.6 |
| BNP | Darren Smith | 466 | 15.2 | +4.0 |
| Majority | | 424 | 13.8 | +4.8 |
| Turnout | | 3,069 | 30.4 | +1.8 |
| Labour hold | | Swing | | |

=== Bitterne Park ===
Bitterne Park
| Party | Candidate | Votes | % | ±% |
|---|---|---|---|---|
| Conservative | Philip Williams | 1,637 | 45.2 | +8.4 |
| Liberal Democrats | Keith Reed | 767 | 21.2 | −12.7 |
| Labour | Michael Brainsby | 728 | 20.1 | +3.4 |
| Green | Joseph Cox | 288 | 8.0 | +8.0 |
| Independent | Mark Adams | 200 | 5.5 | +5.5 |
| Majority | | 870 | 24.0 | +21.2 |
| Turnout | | 3,620 | 35.3 | −2.3 |
| Conservative hold | | Swing | | |

=== Coxford ===
Coxford
| Party | Candidate | Votes | % | ±% |
|---|---|---|---|---|
| Liberal Democrats | Peter Galton | 1,229 | 37.2 | +1.6 |
| Labour | Donald Thomas | 1,180 | 35.7 | +3.0 |
| Conservative | Edward Daunt | 620 | 18.8 | +3.5 |
| Green | David Curl | 273 | 8.3 | +8.3 |
| Majority | | 49 | 1.5 | −1.5 |
| Turnout | | 3,302 | 32.1 | +1.8 |
| Liberal Democrats hold | | Swing | | |

=== Freemantle ===
Freemantle
| Party | Candidate | Votes | % | ±% |
|---|---|---|---|---|
| Conservative | Jeremy Moulton | 1,310 | 40.7 | +3.7 |
| Labour | Thomas Flynn | 976 | 30.4 | −2.4 |
| Liberal Democrats | Ann Russell | 483 | 15.0 | −4.0 |
| Green | Darren Pickering | 446 | 13.9 | +2.8 |
| Majority | | 334 | 10.4 | +6.2 |
| Turnout | | 3,215 | 30.4 | −1.4 |
| Conservative hold | | Swing | | |

=== Harefield ===
Harefield
| Party | Candidate | Votes | % | ±% |
|---|---|---|---|---|
| Conservative | Royston Smith | 2,054 | 55.9 | +9.4 |
| Labour | Penelope Baldwin | 1,024 | 27.9 | −0.7 |
| Liberal Democrats | Diana Wills | 595 | 16.2 | −2.2 |
| Majority | | 1,030 | 28.0 | +10.1 |
| Turnout | | 3,673 | 35.3 | +1.3 |
| Conservative hold | | Swing | | |

=== Millbrook ===
Millbrook
| Party | Candidate | Votes | % | ±% |
|---|---|---|---|---|
| Liberal Democrats | Ceren Davis | 1,245 | 38.4 | −3.4 |
| Conservative | Andrew Wells | 862 | 26.6 | +5.5 |
| Labour | Keith Morrell | 854 | 26.4 | +3.4 |
| UKIP | Stephen Phillips | 278 | 8.6 | −5.6 |
| Majority | | 383 | 11.8 | −6.9 |
| Turnout | | 3,239 | 29.8 | −2.2 |
| Liberal Democrats hold | | Swing | | |

=== Peartree ===
Peartree
| Party | Candidate | Votes | % | ±% |
|---|---|---|---|---|
| Liberal Democrats | Gerry Drake | 1,607 | 48.7 | +2.2 |
| Conservative | Robert Alexander | 922 | 27.9 | −0.9 |
| Labour | Paul Jenks | 772 | 23.4 | −1.3 |
| Majority | | 685 | 20.8 | +3.2 |
| Turnout | | 3,301 | 32.6 | −0.3 |
| Liberal Democrats hold | | Swing | | |

=== Portswood ===
Portswood (2)
| Party | Candidate | Votes | % | ±% |
|---|---|---|---|---|
| Liberal Democrats | Jill Baston | 1,600 | | |
| Liberal Democrats | Steven Sollitt | 1,150 | | |
| Conservative | Victoria Pulham | 680 | | |
| Green | Christopher Bluemel | 585 | | |
| Conservative | Paul Wraight | 552 | | |
| Labour | Ann Wardle | 551 | | |
| Labour | David Furnell | 482 | | |
| Independent | Peter Knight | 310 | | |
| Respect | David Fegan | 144 | | |
| Independent | Jeanne Butterfield | 109 | | |
| Turnout | | 6,163 | 34.0 | −1.3 |
| Liberal Democrats hold | | Swing | | |
| Liberal Democrats hold | | Swing | | |

=== Redbridge ===
Redbridge
| Party | Candidate | Votes | % | ±% |
|---|---|---|---|---|
| Labour | Catherine McEwing | 1,403 | 44.3 | +3.7 |
| Liberal Democrats | Paul Russell | 995 | 31.4 | −2.0 |
| Conservative | Matthew Dean | 770 | 24.3 | −1.7 |
| Majority | | 408 | 12.9 | +5.7 |
| Turnout | | 3,168 | 30.5 | +1.5 |
| Labour gain from Liberal Democrats | | Swing | | |

=== Shirley ===
Shirley
| Party | Candidate | Votes | % | ±% |
|---|---|---|---|---|
| Conservative | Edwina Cooke | 1,591 | 41.9 | +3.2 |
| Labour | Graham Giles | 1,011 | 26.6 | −1.4 |
| Liberal Democrats | Jane Langshaw | 499 | 13.1 | −6.4 |
| Green | John Spottiswoode | 482 | 12.7 | +12.7 |
| UKIP | David Geddes | 217 | 5.7 | −4.7 |
| Majority | | 580 | 15.3 | +4.5 |
| Turnout | | 3,800 | 37.9 | −1.5 |
| Conservative hold | | Swing | | |

=== Sholing ===
Sholing
| Party | Candidate | Votes | % | ±% |
|---|---|---|---|---|
| Labour | Susan Blatchford | 1,650 | 41.9 | +6.4 |
| Conservative | Clare Bettison | 1,363 | 34.6 | +1.4 |
| Liberal Democrats | Barbara Cove | 529 | 13.4 | −0.3 |
| UKIP | Tony Weaver | 392 | 10.0 | −7.7 |
| Majority | | 287 | 7.3 | +5.0 |
| Turnout | | 3,934 | 37.3 | +2.2 |
| Labour hold | | Swing | | |

=== Swaythling ===
Swaythling
| Party | Candidate | Votes | % | ±% |
|---|---|---|---|---|
| Liberal Democrats | David Beckett | 975 | 41.1 | −0.7 |
| Conservative | Matthew Costen | 681 | 28.7 | +6.9 |
| Labour | Andrew Wilson | 457 | 19.3 | −2.4 |
| Green | Peter Davis | 260 | 11.0 | +11.0 |
| Majority | | 294 | 12.4 | −7.6 |
| Turnout | | 2,373 | 25.0 | −1.2 |
| Liberal Democrats hold | | Swing | | |

=== Woolston ===
Woolston
| Party | Candidate | Votes | % | ±% |
|---|---|---|---|---|
| Labour | Carol Cunio | 1,525 | 50.7 | +5.6 |
| Conservative | Kim Baillie | 792 | 26.3 | +4.8 |
| Liberal Democrats | Martin Lisle | 693 | 23.0 | −10.5 |
| Majority | | 733 | 24.4 | +12.8 |
| Turnout | | 3,010 | 30.3 | −2.7 |
| Labour hold | | Swing | | |

| Preceded by 2004 Southampton Council election | Southampton local elections | Succeeded by 2007 Southampton Council election |
