= 2007 Southampton City Council election =

2007 UK local government election

Map of the results of the 2007 Southampton council election. Conservatives in blue, Labour in red and Liberal Democrats in yellow.

The 2007 Southampton Council election took place on 3 May 2007 to elect members of Southampton Unitary Council in Hampshire, England. One third of the council was up for election and the council stayed under no overall control.

After the election, the composition of the council was:

- Conservative 18
- Labour 18
- Liberal Democrat 12

== Campaign ==
Before the election the Conservative and Labour parties both had 16 seats, while the Liberal Democrats who formed the administration had 15 seats, with one seat, formerly Liberal Democrat, being vacant. 17 seats were being contested in the election, with 2 seats up in Millbrook after Liberal Democrat Virginia Moore resigned from the council.

In total 69 candidates were standing and as well as candidates from the national political parties, a couple of candidates stood for local parties called Southampton First and Southampton Save Our Services. They campaigned on local issues, with Southampton Save Our Services running on a platform calling for improved conditions for public sector workers in Southampton. Candidates also included a 20-year-old Conservative, Vince Capozzoli in Portswood, after the age for councillors was reduced from 21 to 18.

National politicians including Conservative leader David Cameron and Labour cabinet minister Peter Hain visited Southampton to campaign for their parties.

The council used an electronic system to check postal votes, but had to check them by hand after the system failed to read up to 40% of them.

== Election result ==
The results saw no party win a majority, but the Liberal Democrats lost 4 seats, 2 each to the Conservative and Labour parties. The Conservatives won 9 of the 17 seats contested, to move to 18 seats, level with Labour, while the Liberal Democrats fell to 12 seats. One of the Conservative gains from the Liberal Democrats came in Swaythling and was put down to plans for a travellers' camp in the area, which had been opposed by the Conservative candidate. Overall turnout in the election was 30.2%.

Following the election Conservative group leader Alec Samuels was elected leader of the council. This came after one Liberal Democrat councillor, Norah Goss, voted in favour of a Conservative administration, breaking from the rest of the party who abstained.

Southampton local election result 2007
Party	Seats	Gains	Losses	Net gain/loss	Seats %	Votes %	Votes	+/−
Conservative	9	2	0	▲2	52.9	37.5	20,321	▲5.0
Labour	6	2	0	▲2	35.3	30.5	16,489	▲0.7
Liberal Democrats	2	0	4	▼4	11.8	23.8	12,892	▼5.0
Green	0	0	0	Steady	0	5.1	2,745	▲0.8
UKIP	0	0	0	Steady	0	2.2	1,201	▲0.6
Official Southampton First	0	0	0	Steady	0	0.6	299	▲0.6
Socialist Alternative	0	0	0	Steady	0	0.2	116	▼0.1
Southampton Save our Services	0	0	0	Steady	0	0.1	80	▲0.1

== Ward results ==
=== Bargate ===
Bargate
Party	Candidate	Votes	%	±%
Labour	Parvin Damani	893	43.2	+2.1
Conservative	Amy Whiskerd	675	32.6	0.0
Liberal Democrats	Sylvia Drake	305	14.7	−1.2
Green	Rigel Jenman	195	9.4	+9.4
Majority		218	10.5	+2.0
Turnout		2,068	16.0	−0.8
Labour hold		Swing		

=== Bassett ===
Bassett
Party	Candidate	Votes	%	±%
Conservative	Alec Samuels	1,858	47.4	+2.0
Liberal Democrats	Sharon Mintoff	1,420	36.2	−10.4
Labour	Michael Brainsby	427	10.9	+2.9
UKIP	Michael Cottrell	217	5.5	+5.5
Majority		438	11.2	
Turnout		3,922	35.9	−4.8
Conservative hold		Swing		

=== Bevois ===
Bevois
Party	Candidate	Votes	%	±%
Labour	Jacqueline Rayment	1,113	50.8	−0.2
Conservative	Matthew Turpin	466	21.3	+2.1
Liberal Democrats	Paul Clarke	282	12.9	−10.0
Green	Josephine Furness	215	9.8	+9.8
Socialist Alternative	Nicholas Chaffey	116	5.3	−1.5
Majority		647	29.5	+1.5
Turnout		2,192	20.9	−2.5
Labour hold		Swing		

=== Bitterne ===
Bitterne
Party	Candidate	Votes	%	±%
Labour	Matthew Stevens	1,373	48.3	+6.8
Conservative	Edward Osmond	961	33.8	+6.1
Liberal Democrats	Robert Naish	510	17.9	+2.2
Majority		412	14.5	+0.7
Turnout		2,844	28.6	−1.8
Labour hold		Swing		

=== Bitterne Park ===
Bitterne Park
Party	Candidate	Votes	%	±%
Conservative	Peter Baillie	1,663	49.3	+4.1
Labour	Shaun Brady	734	21.8	+1.7
Liberal Democrats	Arnold Robinson	720	21.4	+0.4
Green	Sarah Curl	254	7.5	−0.5
Majority		929	27.6	+3.6
Turnout		3,371	32.6	−2.7
Conservative hold		Swing		

=== Coxford ===
Coxford
Party	Candidate	Votes	%	±%
Labour	Donald Thomas	1,219	34.9	−0.8
Liberal Democrats	Kenneth Darke	1,162	33.3	−3.9
Conservative	Neil Fitzgerald	784	22.4	+3.6
UKIP	Leslie Obee	201	5.8	+5.8
Green	David Curl	128	3.7	−4.6
Majority		57	1.6	
Turnout		3,494	33.9	+1.8
Labour gain from Liberal Democrats		Swing		

=== Freemantle ===
Freemantle
Party	Candidate	Votes	%	±%
Conservative	Brian Parnell	1,369	45.8	+5.1
Labour	Harry Mitchell	815	27.3	−3.1
Liberal Democrats	Juliet Williams	407	13.6	−1.4
Green	Darren Pickering	395	13.2	−0.7
Majority		554	18.6	+8.2
Turnout		2,986	28.2	−2.2
Conservative hold		Swing		

=== Harefield ===
Harefield
Party	Candidate	Votes	%	±%
Conservative	Adrian Johnson	1,723	49.2	−6.7
Labour	Paul Jenks	1,017	29.0	+1.1
Liberal Democrats	Diana Wills	490	14.0	−2.2
Green	Andrew Shaw	275	7.8	+7.8
Majority		706	20.1	−7.9
Turnout		3,505	33.2	−2.1
Conservative hold		Swing		

=== Millbrook ===
Millbrook (2)
Party	Candidate	Votes	%	±%
Conservative	Linda Norris	1,330		
Conservative	Andrew Wells	1,268		
Liberal Democrats	Robert Holmes	1,048		
Liberal Democrats	Keith Reed	974		
Labour	Keith Morrell	855		
Labour	Richard Green	811		
Green	Victoria Payne	350		
UKIP	Stephen Phillips	246		
Turnout		6,882	32.8	
Conservative hold		Swing		
Conservative gain from Liberal Democrats		Swing		

=== Peartree ===
Peartree
Party	Candidate	Votes	%	±%
Liberal Democrats	John Slade	1,443	44.3	−4.4
Conservative	Kim Baillie	972	29.9	+2.0
Labour	Julian Price	839	25.8	+2.4
Majority		471	14.5	−6.3
Turnout		3,254	31.9	−0.7
Liberal Democrats hold		Swing		

=== Portswood ===
Portswood
Party	Candidate	Votes	%	±%
Liberal Democrats	Steven Sollitt	1,063	33.3	
Conservative	Vincenzo Capozzoli	840	26.3	
Labour	Ann Wardle	560	17.5	
Green	Joseph Cox	350	11.0	
Official Southampton First	Peter Knight	299	9.4	
Southampton Save our Services	Neil Kelly	80	2.5	
Majority		223	7.0	
Turnout		3,192	29.6	−4.4
Liberal Democrats hold		Swing		

=== Redbridge ===
Redbridge
Party	Candidate	Votes	%	±%
Labour	Peter Marsh-Jenks	1,292	43.0	−1.3
Liberal Democrats	Paul Russell	906	30.1	−1.3
Conservative	Clare Bettison	808	26.9	+2.6
Majority		368	12.8	−0.1
Turnout		3,006	28.9	−1.6
Labour hold		Swing		

=== Shirley ===
Shirley
Party	Candidate	Votes	%	±%
Conservative	Matthew Dean	1,762	44.9	+3.0
Labour	Graham Giles	1,256	32.0	+5.4
Liberal Democrats	Pauline Harding	395	10.1	−3.0
Green	John Spottiswoode	327	8.3	−4.4
UKIP	David Geddes	183	4.7	−1.0
Majority		506	12.9	−2.4
Turnout		3,923	38.2	+0.3
Conservative hold		Swing		

=== Sholing ===
Sholing
Party	Candidate	Votes	%	±%
Conservative	Gavin Dick	1,787	45.1	+10.5
Labour	David Furnell	1,435	36.2	−5.7
Liberal Democrats	Martin Lisle	390	9.8	−3.6
UKIP	Tony Weaver	354	8.9	−1.1
Majority		352	8.9	
Turnout		3,966	37.3	+0.0
Conservative hold		Swing		

=== Swaythling ===
Swaythling
Party	Candidate	Votes	%	±%
Conservative	Diana Odgers	1,215	45.2	+16.5
Liberal Democrats	Anne Work	711	26.5	−14.6
Labour	Andrew Wilson	504	18.8	−0.5
Green	Christopher Bluemel	256	9.5	−1.5
Majority		504	18.7	
Turnout		2,686	28.4	+3.4
Conservative gain from Liberal Democrats		Swing		

=== Woolston ===
Woolston
Party	Candidate	Votes	%	±%
Labour	Warwick Payne	1,346	47.2	−3.5
Conservative	John Whiskerd	840	29.5	+3.2
Liberal Democrats	Barbara Cove	666	23.4	+0.4
Majority		506	17.7	−6.7
Turnout		2,852	28.5	−1.8
Labour gain from Liberal Democrats		Swing		

Preceded by 2006 Southampton Council election	Southampton local elections	Succeeded by 2008 Southampton Council election
