= 2022 Southampton City Council election =

2022 UK local government election

← 2021	5 May 2022	2023 →

17 of the 48 seats to Southampton City Council 25 seats needed for a majority
	First party	Second party	Third party
Leader	Satvir Kaur	Daniel Fitzhenry	Richard Blackman
Party	Labour	Conservative	Liberal Democrats
Leader's seat	Shirley	Harefield	Bassett
Last election	8 (2018)	7 (2018)	0 (2018)
Seats before	23	25	0
Seats won	13	3	1
Seats after	26	21	1
Seat change	▲3	▼4	▲1
- Map showing the election results. Each ward represents 1 seat
Majority party before election
Conservative
Majority party after election
Labour

Elections to Southampton City Council took place on Thursday 5 May 2022, alongside nationwide local elections, alongside other local elections across the country. The seats up for election were last contested in 2018. The Labour Party regained control of the council from the Conservative Party, which it had lost at the previous year's elections.

== Results summary ==
2022 Southampton City Council election
Party	This election			Full council			This election		
Party	Seats	Net	Seats %	Other	Total	Total %	Votes	Votes %	+/−
Labour	13	▲3	76.5	13	26	54.2	26,863	46.7	+8.9
Conservative	3	▼4	17.6	18	21	43.8	20,548	35.7	–7.1
Liberal Democrats	1	▲1	5.9	0	1	2.1	5,197	9.0	+0.5
Green	0	Steady	0.0	0	0	0.0	4,056	7.1	–2.0
TUSC	0	Steady	0.0	0	0	0.0	832	1.4	+0.4

== Ward results ==
=== Bargate ===
Bargate
Party	Candidate	Votes	%	±%
Labour	Sarah Bogle	1,696	58.7	+12.7
Conservative	Charles Perez-Storey	751	26.0	−4.6
Green	Joe Cox	241	8.3	−2.1
Liberal Democrats	Josh Smith	150	5.2	−1.4
TUSC	Graham Henry	52	1.8	−0.2
Majority		945	32.7	
Turnout		2,908	23.32	
Labour hold		Swing		

=== Bassett ===
Bassett
Party	Candidate	Votes	%	±%
Liberal Democrats	Richard Blackman	2,108	52.6	+18.6
Conservative	Neil Sahota	1,406	35.1	−9.3
Labour	Christian Michael Cox	446	11.1	−4.1
TUSC	Michael Marx	51	1.3	+0.7
Majority		702	17.5	
Turnout		4,027	42.65	
Liberal Democrats gain from Conservative		Swing		

=== Bevois ===
Bevois
Party	Candidate	Votes	%	±%
Labour	Toqeer Ahmed Kataria	2,230	70.8	+12.4
Conservative	Pritheepal Singh Roath	430	13.7	−2.1
Green	Ronald Nicholas Meldrum	255	8.1	−1.9
Liberal Democrats	Amy Eve Greenwood	178	5.7	+0.6
TUSC	Nicholas Philip Chaffey	56	1.8	+0.6
Majority		1,800	57.1	
Turnout		3,165	29.62	
Labour hold		Swing		

=== Bitterne ===
Bitterne
Party	Candidate	Votes	%	±%
Conservative	Terry Michael Streets	1,248	47.1	−8.4
Labour	Andrew John Frampton	1,097	41.4	+7.7
Green	Michael Charles John Mawle	141	5.3	−0.8
Liberal Democrats	Nicholas McGeorge	117	4.4	+0.5
TUSC	Clara Oswin Asher	47	1.8	N/A
Majority		151	5.7	
Turnout		2,659	26.83	
Conservative hold		Swing		

=== Bitterne Park ===
Bitterne Park
Party	Candidate	Votes	%	±%
Labour	Anthony Wyatt Bunday	1,828	47.4	+16.5
Conservative	Robert Craig Harwood	1,573	40.8	−8.2
Green	Helen Mary Makrakis	394	10.2	−3.4
TUSC	Vanessa Antonia Fileman	61	1.6	N/A
Majority		255	6.6	
Turnout		3877	37.79	+0.1
Labour gain from Conservative		Swing		

=== Coxford ===
Coxford
Party	Candidate	Votes	%	±%
Labour	Matthew Renyard	1,429	44.8	+11.7
Conservative	Paul James Patrick Nolan	1,338	42.0	−10.4
Liberal Democrats	Sam Philip Chapman	199	6.2	−0.8
Green	Lucy Michelle Mundell	162	5.1	+0.2
TUSC	Margaret Lorna Fricker	41	1.3	−0.6
Majority		91		
Turnout		3,187	31.43	
Labour hold		Swing		

=== Freemantle ===
Freemantle
Party	Candidate	Votes	%	±%
Labour	Stephen John Leggett	1,989	57.4	+11.7
Conservative	Michaela Dowse	903	26.1	−5.7
Green	Lindsi Bluemel	261	7.5	−3.6
Liberal Democrats	Andrew Thomas Beal	238	6.9	−0.8
TUSC	Catherine Bernadette Clarke	74	2.1	+0.6
Majority		1086		
Turnout		3,478	31.11	
Labour hold		Swing		

=== Harefield ===
Harefield
Party	Candidate	Votes	%	±%
Conservative	Valerie Laurent	1,645	50.4	−5.9
Labour	Paul Robert Kenny	1,201	36.8	+2.8
Green	Christopher Francis Bluemel	208	6.4	+0.3
Liberal Democrats	Benjamin Button Curd	161	4.9	+1.6
TUSC	Levi Joshua Wellman	50	1.5	N/A
Majority		444		
Turnout		3,278	31.55	
Conservative hold		Swing		

=== Millbrook ===
Millbrook
Party	Candidate	Votes	%	±%
Labour	David Furnell	1,622	46.9	+10.7
Conservative	Stephen Graham Patrick Galton	1,511	43.6	−6.1
Green	Jonathan Simon Bean	281	8.1	−0.9
TUSC	Donna Dee	48	1.4	N/A
Majority		111	3.2	
Turnout		3,484	31.63	
Labour gain from Conservative		Swing		

=== Peartree ===
Peartree
Party	Candidate	Votes	%	±%
Labour	Eamonn Francis Keogh	2,046	54.3	+12.1
Conservative	Thomas James Bell	1,339	35.5	−12.0
Liberal Democrats	Robert William Naish	187	5.0	+0.9
Green	Rosanna Elizabeth Newey	169	4.5	−0.3
TUSC	Bevis Fenner	30	0.8	−0.1
Majority		707	18.8	
Turnout		3,780	36.00	
Labour gain from Conservative		Swing		

=== Portswood ===
Portswood
Party	Candidate	Votes	%	±%
Labour	Lisa Mitchell	1,749	47.4	+11.0
Green	Katherine Jane Barbour	1,435	38.9	+11.8
Conservative	Wai Kee Cheng	456	12.4	−4.4
TUSC	Derek Anthony Twine	47	1.3	+0.3
Majority		314	8.5	
Turnout		3,704	39.56	
Labour hold		Swing		

=== Redbridge ===
Redbridge
Party	Candidate	Votes	%	±%
Labour	Katherine Lipton McEwing	1,320	45.3	+1.1
Conservative	David Austin Peter Smith	1,243	42.7	−4.4
Liberal Democrats	Simon David Stokes	157	5.3	+2.3
Green	Angela Mary Cotton	139	4.8	+1.3
TUSC	Peter Michael Wyatt	44	1.5	+0.1
Majority		77	2.6	
Turnout		2,913	26.60	
Labour hold		Swing		

=== Shirley ===
Shirley (2)
Party	Candidate	Votes	%	±%
Labour	Hannah Katherine Amy Coombes	2,237	52.7	+9.8
Labour	Alexander Winning	1,852	43.6	+0.7
Conservative	Andrew Hetherton	1,592	37.5	+0.3
Conservative	Simon Dominic Howell	1,336	31.5	−5.7
Liberal Democrats	Sarah Louise Wood	557	13.1	+3.3
Liberal Democrats	Colin Stuart McDougall	391	9.2	−0.6
TUSC	Andrew Howe	94	2.2	+1.2
Turnout		4,264	40.86	
Labour hold				
Labour hold				

=== Sholing ===
Sholing
Party	Candidate	Votes	%	±%
Conservative	Marley George Guthrie	1,660	50.0	−11.4
Labour	Carol Anne Cunio	1,283	38.7	+10.5
Green	Charlotte Beth Cutt	180	5.4	−0.2
Liberal Democrats	Sharon Pamela Hopkins	165	5.0	+1.4
TUSC	Declan Peter Clune	31	0.9	−0.9
Majority		377	11.4	
Turnout		3,333	31.40	
Conservative hold		Swing		

=== Swaythling ===
Swaythling
Party	Candidate	Votes	%	±%
Labour	Lorna Fielker	1,233	49.4	+9.9
Conservative	Calvin Smith	801	32.1	−8.2
Liberal Democrats	Thomas Gravatt	424	17.0	+9.5
TUSC	Neil Kelly	38	1.5	±0.0
Majority		432	17.3	
Turnout		2,496	42.65	
Labour gain from Conservative		Swing		

=== Woolston ===
Woolston
Party	Candidate	Votes	%	±%
Labour	Susan Jane Blatchford	1,605	47.7	+9.6
Conservative	Jaden William Beaurain	1,316	39.1	−9.0
Green	Clive George Hillman	190	5.6	−0.8
Liberal Democrats	Colin Anthony Bleach	165	4.9	+0.4
TUSC	Susan Anne Atkin	68	2.0	−0.2
Majority		289	8.6	
Turnout		3,364	30.2	+0.9
Labour hold		Swing		
