= 2004 Southampton City Council election =

2004 UK local government election

Map of the results of the 2004 Southampton council election. Labour in red, Conservatives in blue and Liberal Democrats in yellow.

The 2004 Southampton Council election took place on 10 June 2004 to elect members of Southampton Unitary Council in Hampshire, England. One third of the council was up for election and the council stayed under no overall control.

After the election, the composition of the council was:

- Liberal Democrat 19
- Labour 15
- Conservative 14

== Campaign ==
Since the last election in 2003 the Liberal Democrats had run the council as a minority administration, after Labour had previously been in charge for 19 years. The record of the Liberal Democrats for the previous year was a major issue in the election, with the Liberal Democrats pointing to investment in road repairs and in addressing anti-social behaviour, while campaigning for council tax to be replaced by a local income tax. However the Labour and Conservative parties attacked the Liberal Democrats for u-turns such as the stopping of plans for fortnightly refuse collection, charges for parking in the town centre and the dropping of schemes to close football pitches and a leisure centre.

Crucial wards in the election were seen as being Sholing and Bitterne Park. Meanwhile, as well as the three main parties, there were also candidates from the United Kingdom Independence Party, British National Party and the Green Party.

== Election result ==
The results saw the council remain with no party having a majority, but the Labour Party lost 2 seats and the Conservatives gained 2. The Liberal Democrats remained the largest party with 18 seats after gaining Coxford from Labour, but losing Bitterne Park to the Conservatives. The Conservatives grew to 14 seats after also gaining Freemantle from Labour, who thus dropped to 15 seats. The Labour group leader, June Bridle, held her seat in Sholing by 84 votes, with both Labour and the Conservatives saying that the 657 won by the United Kingdom Independence Party had probably enabled Labour to hold on there. Overall turnout in the election increased to 31.6% from 29% in 2003.

Following the election Liberal Democrat Adrian Vinson remained as leader of the council, after being confirmed by a vote of 18 to 0 at a council meeting.

Southampton local election result 2004
Party	Seats	Gains	Losses	Net gain/loss	Seats %	Votes %	Votes	+/−
Labour	6	0	2	▼2	37.5	28.9	15,007	▼1.2
Conservative	5	2	0	▲2	31.3	30.6	15,888	▲0.6
Liberal Democrats	5	1	1	Steady	31.3	30.4	15,738	▼0.3
UKIP	0	0	0	Steady	0.0	6.5	3,370	▲4.6
BNP	0	0	0	Steady	0.0	1.7	868	▼0.8
Green	0	0	0	Steady	0.0	1.5	790	▲0.1
Socialist Alternative	0	0	0	Steady	0.0	0.4	189	▲0.4

== Ward results ==
=== Bargate ===
Bargate
Party	Candidate	Votes	%	±%
Labour	John Noon	752	38.0	−8.1
Conservative	Robert Alexander	568	28.7	−0.5
Liberal Democrats	Diana Wills	414	20.9	−3.7
UKIP	Lorraine Barter	243	12.3	+12.3
Majority		184	9.3	−7.6
Turnout		1,977	17.6	+2.1
Labour hold		Swing		

=== Bassett ===
Bassett
Party	Candidate	Votes	%	±%
Conservative	John Hannides	1,788	43.6	−2.6
Liberal Democrats	Ian Cain	1,433	35.0	+1.3
Labour	Paul Jenks	473	11.5	−1.7
UKIP	Michael Cottrell	322	7.9	+4.8
BNP	Julian Crewe	82	2.0	+2.0
Majority		355	8.7	−3.8
Turnout		4,098	38.8	+4.8
Conservative hold		Swing		

=== Bevois ===
Bevois
Party	Candidate	Votes	%	±%
Labour	Stephen Barnes-Andrews	1,033	42.2	−4.8
Liberal Democrats	Christine Hordley	634	25.9	+4.6
Conservative	Pamela Rees	594	24.2	+5.8
Socialist Alternative	Nicholas Chaffey	189	7.7	+7.7
Majority		399	16.3	−9.3
Turnout		2,450	25.4	+3.9
Labour hold		Swing		

=== Bitterne ===
Bitterne
Party	Candidate	Votes	%	±%
Labour	Christine Kelly	1,145	40.3	−3.9
Conservative	Claire Johnson	888	31.3	+5.5
Liberal Democrats	Robert Naish	491	17.3	+0.3
BNP	Jason Robinson	317	11.2	+1.2
Majority		257	9.0	−9.4
Turnout		2,841	28.6	−0.1
Labour hold		Swing		

=== Bitterne Park ===
Bitterne Park
Party	Candidate	Votes	%	±%
Conservative	Ivan White	1,397	36.8	−5.2
Liberal Democrats	Anne Work	1,289	33.9	−3.2
Labour	David Furnell	635	16.7	−0.7
UKIP	Conrad Brown	476	12.5	+12.5
Majority		108	2.8	−2.1
Turnout		3,797	37.6	+3.4
Conservative gain from Liberal Democrats		Swing		

=== Coxford ===
Coxford
Party	Candidate	Votes	%	±%
Liberal Democrats	Susan Jackson	1,110	35.6	−3.7
Labour	Harry Mitchell	1,018	32.7	+1.8
UKIP	Leslie O'Bee	510	16.4	+13.3
Conservative	Christina Philbrick	478	15.3	+3.3
Majority		92	3.0	−5.4
Turnout		3,116	30.3	+1.5
Liberal Democrats gain from Labour		Swing		

=== Freemantle ===
Freemantle
Party	Candidate	Votes	%	±%
Conservative	Michael Ball	1,207	37.0	−6.9
Labour	Simon Letts	1,070	32.8	+3.9
Liberal Democrats	Barbara Cummins	620	19.0	+2.7
Green	Darren Pickering	363	11.1	+2.5
Majority		137	4.2	−10.8
Turnout		3,260	31.8	+2.9
Conservative gain from Labour		Swing		

=== Harefield ===
Harefield
Party	Candidate	Votes	%	±%
Conservative	Richard Halderthay	1,642	46.5	−4.1
Labour	Warwick Payne	1,011	28.6	−3.7
Liberal Democrats	Simon Hordley	649	18.4	+1.3
BNP	Terrie Rintoul	232	6.6	+6.6
Majority		631	17.9	−0.4
Turnout		3,534	34.0	+0.3
Conservative hold		Swing		

=== Millbrook ===
Millbrook
Party	Candidate	Votes	%	±%
Liberal Democrats	Virginia Moore	1,428	41.8	+0.6
Labour	David Evans	787	23.0	−0.5
Conservative	Tom Donald	720	21.1	+5.6
UKIP	Stephen Phillips	484	14.2	+14.2
Majority		641	18.7	+1.0
Turnout		3,419	32.0	+1.7
Liberal Democrats hold		Swing		

=== Peartree ===
Peartree
Party	Candidate	Votes	%	±%
Liberal Democrats	Norah Goss	1,547	46.5	−2.6
Conservative	Alec Heath	960	28.8	+8.9
Labour	Roger Iles	821	24.7	−1.6
Majority		587	17.6	−5.2
Turnout		3,328	32.9	+2.5
Liberal Democrats hold		Swing		

=== Portswood ===
Portswood
Party	Candidate	Votes	%	±%
Liberal Democrats	Adrian Vinson	1,721	47.3	−0.2
Conservative	Julian Isaacson	864	23.7	+1.9
Labour	Ann Wardle	629	17.3	−0.2
Green	Joseph Cox	427	11.7	+5.3
Majority		857	23.5	−2.2
Turnout		3,641	35.3	+5.0
Liberal Democrats hold		Swing		

=== Redbridge ===
Redbridge
Party	Candidate	Votes	%	±%
Labour	Dennis Harryman	1,217	40.6	−2.7
Liberal Democrats	Ceren Davis	1,000	33.4	+12.4
Conservative	Enid Greenham	778	26.0	+1.5
Majority		217	7.2	−11.6
Turnout		2,995	29.0	+2.0
Labour hold		Swing		

=== Shirley ===
Shirley
Party	Candidate	Votes	%	±%
Conservative	Terence Matthews	1,537	38.7	−5.5
Labour	Michael Lewkowicz	1,110	28.0	−0.8
Liberal Democrats	Sharon Mintoff	775	19.5	+1.1
UKIP	Robert Geddes	413	10.4	+7.4
BNP	Darren Smith	133	3.4	+3.4
Majority		427	10.8	−4.6
Turnout		3,968	39.4	+4.3
Conservative hold		Swing		

=== Sholing ===
Sholing
Party	Candidate	Votes	%	±%
Labour	June Bridle	1,317	35.5	−0.8
Conservative	Michael Denness	1,233	33.2	−4.4
UKIP	Tony Weaver	657	17.7	+10.1
Liberal Democrats	Lesley Moffitt	507	13.7	−3.7
Majority		84	2.3	
Turnout		3,714	35.1	+2.9
Labour hold		Swing		

=== Swaythling ===
Swaythling
Party	Candidate	Votes	%	±%
Liberal Democrats	Ann Milton	1,047	41.8	−4.6
Conservative	Keith Norris	545	21.8	+3.0
Labour	Michael Brainsby	544	21.7	−6.0
UKIP	Rodney Caws	265	10.6	+6.5
BNP	David Green	104	4.2	+4.2
Majority		502	20.0	+1.3
Turnout		2,505	26.2	+2.4
Liberal Democrats hold		Swing		

=== Woolston ===
Woolston
Party	Candidate	Votes	%	±%
Labour	Richard Williams	1,445	45.1	+8.3
Liberal Democrats	Susan Robson	1,073	33.5	−9.1
Conservative	Clifford Combes	689	21.5	+8.6
Majority		372	11.6	
Turnout		3,207	33.0	+3.2
Labour hold		Swing		

Preceded by 2003 Southampton Council election	Southampton local elections	Succeeded by 2006 Southampton Council election
