= 2023 Southampton City Council election =

2023 UK local government election

- 4 May 2023

All 51 seats to Southampton City Council 26 seats needed for a majority

	First party	Second party
Leader	Satvir Kaur	Daniel Fitzhenry
Party	Labour	Conservative
Last election	26 seats, 46.7%	21 seats, 35.7%
Seats before	26	20
Seats won	38	9
Seat change	▲12	▼12
Popular vote	62,447	45,785
Percentage	45.5%	33.4%
Swing	▼1.2%	▼2.3%
	Third party	Fourth party
Party	Liberal Democrats	Green
Last election	1 seat, 9.0%	0 seats, 7.1%
Seats before	1	0
Seats won	3	1
Seat change	▲2	▲1
Popular vote	17,499	9,024
Percentage	12.7%	6.6%
Swing	▲3.7%	▼0.5%
- Winner of each seat at the 2023 Southampton City Council election
Leader before election
Satvir Kaur
Labour
Leader after election
Satvir Kaur
Labour

The 2023 Southampton City Council election took place on 4 May 2023 to elect members of Southampton City Council in Hampshire, England. This was on the same day as other local elections. Due to ward boundary changes all seats on the council were to be contested in this election, but due to the death of one of the candidates, the election for Coxford ward was postponed.

Labour substantially increased its majority on the council, whilst the Conservatives lost over half their seats. The Liberal Democrats and Green Party also made gains.

== Summary ==
=== Election result ===
2023 Southampton City Council election
Party	Candidates	Seats	Gains	Losses	Net gain/loss	Seats %	Votes %	Votes	+/−
Labour	51	38	7	1	▲12	72.9	45.5	62,447	–1.2
Conservative	51	9	0	9	▼12	18.8	33.4	45,785	–2.3
Liberal Democrats	51	3	2	0	▲2	6.3	12.7	17,499	+3.7
Green	24	1	1	0	▲1	2.1	6.6	9,258	–0.4
TUSC	17	0	0	0	Steady	0.0	1.2	1,598	–0.2
Reform	5	0	0	0	Steady	0.0	0.5	682	N/A
Independent	2	0	0	0	Steady	0.0	0.2	224	N/A

== Ward results ==
The Statement of Persons Nominated, which details the candidates standing in each ward, was released by Southampton City Council following the close of nominations on 4 April 2023.

=== Banister & Polygon ===
Banister & Polygon (3 seats)
Party	Candidate	Votes	%	±%
Labour	Pat Evemy	1,307	56.4	
Labour	Steve Leggett*	1,276	55.0	
Labour	Vivienne Windle*	1,145	49.4	
Conservative	Scott Davis	519	22.4	
Conservative	Josh Payne*	496	21.4	
Conservative	Marley Guthrie*	486	21.0	
Green	Sharon Keenan	453	19.5	
Liberal Democrats	Andy Beal	320	13.8	
Liberal Democrats	Aimee Stokes	288	12.4	
Liberal Democrats	Josh Smith	219	9.4	
TUSC	James Rucci	125	5.4	
Turnout		2,331	28.1	
Registered electors		8,288		
Labour win (new seat)				
Labour win (new seat)				
Labour win (new seat)				

=== Bargate ===
Bargate (3 seats)
Party	Candidate	Votes	%	±%
Labour	Sarah Bogle*	1,173	58.3	
Labour	John Noon*	999	49.6	
Labour	Darren Paffey*	915	45.5	
Conservative	Robert Saunders	521	25.9	
Conservative	Tom Brito	510	25.3	
Conservative	Ben Davies	500	24.8	
Green	Joe Cox	257	12.8	
Green	Emma Davis	226	11.2	
Liberal Democrats	Olubunmi Adebayo	219	10.9	
Green	James Dear	128	6.4	
Liberal Democrats	Reuben Hinchliffe	123	6.1	
Liberal Democrats	Michael Dickinson	118	5.9	
TUSC	Donna Dee	73	3.6	
TUSC	Graham Henry	66	3.3	
Turnout		2,024	22.9	
Registered electors		8,827		
Labour hold				
Labour hold				
Labour hold				

=== Bassett ===
Bassett (3 seats)
Party	Candidate	Votes	%	±%
Liberal Democrats	Richard Blackman*	2,099	55.5	
Liberal Democrats	Sam Chapman	1,958	51.7	
Liberal Democrats	Sarah Wood	1,825	48.2	
Conservative	John Hannides*	1,266	33.4	
Conservative	Neil Sahota	1,107	29.2	
Conservative	Spiros Vassiliou	972	25.7	
Labour	Lawrence Coomber	482	12.7	
Labour	Sachin Thorogood	456	12.0	
Labour	Robert Wiltshire	409	10.8	
Reform	Philip Crook	204	5.4	
Turnout		3,803	40.3	
Registered electors		9,439		
Liberal Democrats hold				
Liberal Democrats gain from Conservative				
Liberal Democrats gain from Conservative				

=== Bevois ===
Bevois (3 seats)
Party	Candidate	Votes	%	±%
Labour	Toqeer Kataria*	1,770	72.8	
Labour	Mike Denness*	1,445	59.5	
Labour	Jacqui Rayment*	1,442	59.3	
Green	Rosanna Newey	430	17.7	
Conservative	Hilary Moulton	224	9.2	
Conservative	Richard Palmer	219	9.0	
Liberal Democrats	Vijay Chopra	214	8.8	
Conservative	Pritheepal Singh Roath	208	8.6	
Liberal Democrats	Andrew Landells	172	7.1	
Liberal Democrats	Jonathon Waters	146	6.0	
TUSC	Lennie Scorey-Auckland	108	4.4	
Turnout		2,442	27.2	
Registered electors		8,975		
Labour hold				
Labour hold				
Labour hold				

=== Bitterne Park ===
Bitterne Park (3 seats)
Party	Candidate	Votes	%	±%
Labour	Amanda Barnes-Andrews	1,790	45.4	
Labour	Phil Webb	1,677	42.6	
Labour	Tony Bunday*	1,670	42.4	
Conservative	David Fuller*	1,598	40.6	
Conservative	Rob Harwood	1,289	32.7	
Conservative	Ivan White*	1,259	32.0	
Green	Lindsi Bluemel	593	15.1	
Liberal Democrats	Ben Curd	361	9.2	
Liberal Democrats	Kathryn Chapman	283	7.2	
Liberal Democrats	Nicholas Myers	267	6.8	
Independent	David Kelly	177	4.5	
TUSC	Dawn Strutt	102	2.6	
Turnout		3,950	37.3	
Registered electors		10,581		
Labour gain from Conservative				
Labour gain from Conservative				
Labour hold				

=== Coxford ===
The election in the Coxford ward was suspended on election day due to the death of Conservative candidate Graham Galton on polling day. Southampton City Council announced that a new poll will happen within 35 working days and that no votes already cast on 4 May would be counted.

Coxford (3 seats)
Party	Candidate	Votes	%	±%
Labour	Matt Renyard*	1,022	44.4	
Labour	Rebecca McCreanor	930	40.4	
Labour	Beccy Ruddick	880	38.2	
Conservative	Diana Galton*	806	35.0	
Conservative	Paul Nolan	774	33.6	
Conservative	Vikkie Cheng	712	30.9	
Liberal Democrats	David Chapman	234	10.2	
Liberal Democrats	Peter Galton	228	9.9	
Liberal Democrats	Ken Darke	157	6.8	
Green	Joanna Clements	130	5.6	
Green	Ash Phillips	111	4.8	
Green	Ron Meldrum	104	4.1	
Independent	Ed Surridge	47	2.0	
TUSC	Maggie Fricker	35	1.5	
Turnout		2,301	23.2	
Registered electors				
Labour hold				
Labour hold				
Labour gain from Conservative				

=== Freemantle ===
Freemantle (3 seats)
Party	Candidate	Votes	%	±%
Labour	David Shields*	1,535	56.0	
Labour	Pam Kenny	1,521	55.5	
Labour	Christie Lambert	1,484	54.2	
Conservative	Andrew Palmer	636	23.2	
Conservative	Helen Hetherton	629	23.0	
Conservative	Leonard Mockett	582	21.2	
Green	John Spottiswoode	495	18.1	
Liberal Democrats	Tom Orchard	240	8.8	
Liberal Democrats	Christopher Shank	158	5.8	
Liberal Democrats	Tom Wintrell	157	5.7	
TUSC	Catherine Clarke	149	5.4	
Reform	Katrina de Chazel	112	4.1	
Turnout		2,739	28.4	
Registered electors		9,693		
Labour hold				
Labour hold				
Labour hold				

=== Harefield ===
Harefield (3 seats)
Party	Candidate	Votes	%	±%
Conservative	Peter Baillie*	1,361	45.9	
Conservative	Daniel Fitzhenry*	1,269	42.8	
Conservative	Val Laurent*	1,269	42.8	
Labour	Ken Prior	1,093	36.9	
Labour	Jackie Landman	1,043	35.2	
Labour	Habib Ahmadi	957	32.3	
Green	Chris Bluemel	327	11.0	
Liberal Democrats	Martyn Cooper	286	9.7	
Liberal Democrats	Edward Bolton	271	9.1	
Liberal Democrats	John Slade	212	7.2	
TUSC	Declan Clune	85	2.9	
Turnout		2,977	30.4	
Registered electors		9,804		
Conservative hold				
Conservative hold				
Conservative hold				

=== Millbrook ===
Millbrook (3 seats)
Party	Candidate	Votes	%	±%
Conservative	Steven Galton	1,199	44.0	
Conservative	Jeremy Moulton*	1,165	42.8	
Labour	Christian Cox	1,140	41.9	
Conservative	Vikkie Cheng	1,117	41.0	
Labour	Ashley Minto	1,062	39.0	
Labour	Adrian Pimley	982	36.1	
Green	Joanne Clements	317	11.6	
Liberal Democrats	Martin Ryan	280	10.3	
Liberal Democrats	Andrew Day	181	6.6	
Liberal Democrats	Jeff Robinson	153	5.6	
TUSC	Andrew Howe	98	3.6	
Turnout		2,733	28.8	
Registered electors		9,485		
Conservative hold				
Conservative hold				
Labour hold				

=== Peartree ===
Peartree (3 seats)
Party	Candidate	Votes	%	±%
Labour	Eamonn Keogh*	1,654	47.2	
Conservative	Alex Houghton*	1,594	45.5	
Labour	Simon Letts	1,259	35.9	
Conservative	Susan Spencer	1,225	35.0	
Conservative	Colin Lingwood	1,195	34.1	
Labour	Sarah Walsh	1,180	33.7	
Green	James Bluemel	374	10.7	
Liberal Democrats	Sharon Hopkins	325	9.3	
Liberal Democrats	Robert Naish	286	8.2	
Green	Ebony Thorne	249	7.1	
Liberal Democrats	Francis Hedley	243	6.9	
TUSC	Ali Haydor	86	2.5	
Turnout		3,514	32.6	
Registered electors		10,776		
Labour hold				
Conservative hold				
Labour gain from Conservative				

=== Portswood ===
Portswood (3 seats)
Party	Candidate	Votes	%	±%
Green	Katherine Barbour	1,391	41.7	
Labour	Anne Marie Finn	1,274	38.2	
Labour	John Savage*	1,246	37.3	
Labour	Gordon Cooper*	1,237	37.1	
Green	Jonathan Bean	866	26.0	
Green	Helen Makrakis	846	25.4	
Conservative	Karen Edwards	717	21.5	
Conservative	Nicholas Moulton	655	19.6	
Conservative	Patricia O'Dell	623	18.7	
Liberal Democrats	James Read	218	6.5	
Liberal Democrats	Paul Clarke	203	6.1	
Liberal Democrats	John Langran	193	5.8	
Reform	Tony Adhikary	84	2.5	
TUSC	Derek Twine	76	2.3	
Turnout		3,347	40.3	
Registered electors		8,312		
Green gain from Labour				
Labour hold				
Labour hold				

=== Redbridge ===
Redbridge (3 seats)
Party	Candidate	Votes	%	±%
Labour	Sally Goodfellow*	1,166	48.6	
Labour	Lee Whitbread	1,160	48.4	
Labour	Cathie McEwing*	1,125	46.9	
Conservative	Amanda Guest*	828	34.5	
Conservative	Tom Bell	808	33.7	
Conservative	David Smith	770	32.1	
Green	Christopher James	207	8.6	
Reform	John Edwards	155	6.5	
Liberal Democrats	Max Hayman	144	6.0	
Liberal Democrats	Simon Stokes	142	5.9	
Liberal Democrats	Andrea Matteucci	128	5.3	
TUSC	Peter Wyatt	76	3.2	
Turnout		2,403	24.9	
Registered electors		9,643		
Labour hold				
Labour gain from Conservative				
Labour hold				

=== Shirley ===
Shirley (3 seats)
Party	Candidate	Votes	%	±%
Labour	Satvir Kaur*	1,956	50.8	
Labour	Alex Winning*	1,688	43.9	
Labour	Razwana Quadir	1,599	41.5	
Conservative	Andrew Hetherton	1,286	33.4	
Conservative	Michaela Dowse	1,173	30.5	
Conservative	Simon Howell	1,119	29.1	
Liberal Democrats	Ellen McGeorge	612	15.9	
Green	Lucy Mundell	551	14.3	
Liberal Democrats	George Percival	477	12.4	
Liberal Democrats	Roland Dauncey	406	10.5	
TUSC	Michael Marx	92	2.4	
Turnout		3,849	37.4	
Registered electors		10,345		
Labour hold				
Labour hold				
Labour hold				

=== Sholing ===
Sholing (3 seats)
Party	Candidate	Votes	%	±%
Conservative	James Baillie*	1,438	46.4	
Conservative	Sarah Vaughan*	1,349	43.6	
Conservative	Jaden Beaurain	1,297	41.9	
Labour	Paul Lewzey	1,111	35.9	
Labour	Gillian Green	1,101	35.6	
Labour	Paul Kenny	1,040	33.6	
Liberal Democrats	Eileen Bowers	348	11.2	
Green	David Gower	332	10.7	
Liberal Democrats	Benjamin Hughes	330	10.7	
Liberal Democrats	Alex Clifton	169	5.5	
TUSC	Jonathan Stubbs	105	3.4	
Turnout		3,110	29.9	
Registered electors		10,408		
Conservative hold				
Conservative hold				
Conservative hold				

=== Swaythling ===
Swaythling (3 seats)
Party	Candidate	Votes	%	±%
Labour	Lorna Fielker*	1,293	50.6	
Labour	Matthew Bunday*	1,221	47.8	
Labour	Sharon Mintoff	1,173	45.9	
Conservative	Bob Painton	545	21.3	
Conservative	Nicole Harris	516	20.2	
Liberal Democrats	Roger Baker	515	20.1	
Conservative	Fergus Muir	468	18.3	
Green	Angela Cotton	460	18.0	
Liberal Democrats	Thomas Gravatt	445	17.4	
Liberal Democrats	Amy Greenwood	442	17.3	
TUSC	Nick Chaffey	118	4.6	
Turnout		2,571	29.8	
Registered electors		8,632		
Labour hold				
Labour hold				
Labour gain from Conservative				

=== Thornhill ===
Thornhill (3 seats)
Party	Candidate	Votes	%	±%
Labour	Yvonne Frampton	1,169	45.8	
Labour	Andy Frampton	1,162	45.6	
Labour	Josh Allen	1,141	44.7	
Conservative	Callum Ford	998	39.1	
Conservative	Matt Jones	960	37.6	
Conservative	Matt Magee	933	36.6	
Green	Michael Mawle	191	7.5	
Liberal Democrats	Carrie Hingston	172	6.7	
Green	Ronald Meldrum	137	5.4	
Liberal Democrats	Nick McGeorge	111	4.4	
Liberal Democrats	Haylee Solomons	77	3.0	
TUSC	Clara Asher	63	2.5	
Turnout		2,556	25.8	
Registered electors		9,902		
Labour win (new seat)				
Labour win (new seat)				
Labour win (new seat)				

=== Woolston ===
Woolston (3 seats)
Party	Candidate	Votes	%	±%
Labour	Warwick Payne*	1,410	50.2	
Labour	Sue Blatchford	1,332	47.4	
Labour	Victoria Ugwoeme	1,145	40.8	
Conservative	Rob Stead*	990	35.2	
Conservative	Sarah Baillie	890	31.7	
Conservative	George Wills-McCaffery	715	25.5	
Green	Alexander Bluemel	410	14.6	
Liberal Democrats	John Dennis	224	8.0	
TUSC	Sue Atkins	141	5.0	
Reform	Paul Hooper	127	4.5	
Liberal Democrats	Christopher Smith	111	4.0	
Liberal Democrats	Charles Duthie	99	3.5	
Turnout		2,809	26.9	
Registered electors		10,482		
Labour hold				
Labour hold				
Labour gain from Conservative				
