= 2016 Southampton City Council election =

2016 UK local government election

← 2015	5 May 2016	2018 →

A third of seats to Southampton City Council 25 seats needed for a majority
	First party	Second party
Party	Labour	Conservative
Seats won	12	5
Seat change	Steady	▼1
Popular vote	23,456	17,605
Percentage	41.7%	31.3%
Swing	▼2.3%	▼4.9%
	Third party
Party	Independent
Seats won	1
Seat change	▲1
Popular vote	2,286
Percentage	4.1%
Swing	▲2.7%
- Map showing the election results. Each ward represents 1 seat
Majority party before election
Labour
Majority party after election
Labour

Composition of the whole Southampton City Council after the 2016 elections. Labour in red, Conservatives in blue, Councillors Against Cuts in dark red, and Independent in grey.

The 2016 Southampton City Council election took place on 5 May 2016 to elect members of Southampton City Council in England. This was on the same day as other local elections.

After the election, the composition of the council was:

- Labour 25
- Conservative 19 (-1)
- Councillors Against Cuts 3 (+1)
- Independent 1

== Election result ==
Southampton Council is elected in thirds, which means all comparisons are to the corresponding 2012 Southampton Council election.

Southampton local election result 2016
Party	Seats	Gains	Losses	Net gain/loss	Seats %	Votes %	Votes	+/−
Labour	12	2	2	Steady	66.7	41.7	23,456	▼2.3
Conservative	5	1	2	▼1	27.8	31.3	17,605	▼4.9
Independent	1	1	0	▲1	5.6	4.1	2,286	▲2.7
UKIP	0	0	0	Steady	0.0	7.9	4,444	▲5.5
Liberal Democrats	0	0	0	Steady	0.0	7.0	3,911	▼2.9
Green	0	0	0	Steady	0.0	6.1	3,451	▲2.2
TUSC	0	0	0	Steady	0.0	1.9	1,060	▼0.3

Comparison to local election result 2015
Party	Votes %	+/-
Labour	41.7	▲7.5
Conservative	31.3	▼2.8
Independent	4.1	▲1.6
UKIP	7.9	▼4.5
Liberal Democrats	7.0	▼0.3
Green	6.1	▼2.4
TUSC	1.9	▲0.9

== Ward results ==
=== Bargate ===
Bargate
Party	Candidate	Votes	%
Labour	Darren Paffey	1,285	46.5
Conservative	Spencer Bowman	867	31.4
Independent	John Easton	243	8.8
Green	Joe Cox	221	8.0
Liberal Democrats	Tom Gravatt	137	5.0
Majority		418	15.1
Turnout		2,765	24.8
Labour hold			

=== Bassett ===
Bassett
Party	Candidate	Votes	%
Conservative	John Hannides	1,452	47.4
Labour	Matthew Renyard	710	23.2
Liberal Democrats	Steven Hulbert	356	11.6
UKIP	Jean Romsey	291	9.5
Green	James Peploe	204	6.7
TUSC	David Rawlinson	28	0.9
Majority		742	24.2
Turnout		3,063	31.2
Conservative hold			

=== Bevois ===
Bevois
Party	Candidate	Votes	%
Labour	Stephen Barnes-Andrews	1,866	69.2
Conservative	Felix Davies	319	11.8
Green	Rosie Pearce	206	7.6
UKIP	Richard Lyons	151	5.6
Liberal Democrats	Paul Clarke	110	4.1
TUSC	Andrew Howe	30	1.1
Majority		1,547	57.4
Turnout		2,698	26.4
Labour hold			

=== Bitterne ===
Bitterne
Party	Candidate	Votes	%
Labour	Frances Murphy	1,150	41.2
Conservative	Edward Osmond	783	28.1
UKIP	Kim Rose	541	19.4
Liberal Democrats	Rob Naish	132	4.7
Green	Jodie Coperland	128	4.6
TUSC	Dawn Strutt	42	1.5
Majority		367	13.1
Turnout		2,791	28.1
Labour hold			

=== Bitterne Park ===
Bitterne Park
Party	Candidate	Votes	%
Conservative	Ivan White	1,398	42.0
Labour	Stephen Fenerty	1,223	36.7
Green	Jennifer Barnes	342	10.3
Liberal Democrats	James Read	261	7.8
TUSC	Linda Boulton	80	2.4
Majority		175	5.3
Turnout		3,330	32.1
Conservative hold			

=== Coxford ===
Coxford
Party	Candidate	Votes	%
Independent	Tammy Thomas	1,317	38.6
Labour	Sally Spicer	924	27.1
UKIP	Joe Lockyer	498	14.6
Conservative	Trevor Glasspool	396	11.6
Liberal Democrats	Victoria Galton	113	3.3
Independent	Richard McQuillan	84	2.5
Green	Derek Chandler	70	2.1
Majority		393	11.5
Turnout		3,414	33.2
Independent gain from Labour			

=== Freemantle ===
Freemantle
Party	Candidate	Votes	%
Labour	Dave Shields	1,623	47.3
Conservative	Chris Grace	1,063	31.0
UKIP	Colin Hingston	306	8.9
Green	Jonathan Martin	256	7.5
Liberal Democrats	Amy Greenwood	178	5.2
Majority		560	16.3
Turnout		3,433	33.1
Labour hold			

=== Harefield ===
Harefield (2)
Party	Candidate	Votes	%
Conservative	Peter Baillie	1,525	46.5
Conservative	Valerie Laurent	1,362	
Labour	Mary Lloyd	1,054	32.1
Labour	Daniel Lucas	883	
Green	Chris Bluemel	246	7.5
Liberal Democrats	Carol Lloyd	204	6.2
Liberal Democrats	John Dennis	189	
TUSC	Carole Fletcher	171	5.2
Green	Michael Mawle	165	
TUSC	Graham O'Reilly	133	
Turnout		3,280	32.1
Conservative hold			
Conservative hold			

=== Millbrook ===
Millbrook
Party	Candidate	Votes	%
Labour	Sarah Taggart	1,517	41.4
Conservative	Steven Galton	1,332	36.4
UKIP	Pearline Hingston	442	12.1
Liberal Democrats	Graham Galton	167	4.6
Green	Jonathan Bean	152	4.2
TUSC	Peter Wyatt	31	0.8
Majority		185	5.0
Turnout		3,660	34.0
Labour gain from Conservative			

=== Peartree ===
Peartree
Party	Candidate	Votes	%
Labour	Eamonn Keogh	1,655	45.0
Conservative	Marley Guthrie	1,178	32.0
UKIP	Vincent Avellino	468	12.7
Liberal Democrats	Eileen Bowers	180	4.9
Green	Gemma Mathieson	160	4.4
TUSC	Mike Marx	21	0.6
Majority		477	13.0
Turnout		3,677	35.8
Labour hold			

=== Portswood ===
Portswood
Party	Candidate	Votes	%
Labour	John Savage	1,106	33.3
Conservative	Linda Norris	851	25.6
Liberal Democrats	Adrian Ford	823	24.8
Green	Kieren Brown	313	9.4
UKIP	Molly Chandler	180	5.4
TUSC	Nick Chaffey	34	1.0
Majority		255	7.7
Turnout		3,318	32.5
Labour gain from Conservative			

=== Redbridge ===
Redbridge
Party	Candidate	Votes	%
Labour	Lee Whitbread	1,412	46.4
UKIP	Stephen McKinnon	590	19.4
Conservative	Preshan Jeevaratnam	437	14.4
Independent	Denise Wyatt	413	13.6
Liberal Democrats	Simon Stokes	101	3.3
Green	Chris James	76	2.5
Majority		822	27.0
Turnout		3,044	29.0
Labour hold			

=== Shirley ===
Shirley
Party	Candidate	Votes	%
Labour	Mark Chaloner	1,931	46.2
Conservative	Matthew Turpin	1,142	27.3
UKIP	Nick Ray	421	10.1
Liberal Democrats	Peter Galton	253	6.0
Independent	David Fletcher	229	5.5
Green	John Spottiswoode	198	4.7
Majority		789	18.9
Turnout		4,182	41.2
Labour hold			

=== Sholing ===
Sholing
Party	Candidate	Votes	%
Conservative	James Baillie	1,445	40.3
Labour	Dan Jeffery	1,286	35.9
UKIP	Derek Humber	556	15.5
Green	Nick Ford	120	3.3
Liberal Democrats	Ken Darke	110	3.1
TUSC	Declan Clune	50	1.4
Majority		159	4.4
Turnout		3,584	34.0
Conservative gain from Labour			

=== Swaythling ===
Swaythling
Party	Candidate	Votes	%
Labour	Sharon Mintoff	1,145	47.6
Conservative	Harmeet Singh Brar	693	28.8
Green	Angela Cotton	241	10.0
Liberal Democrats	Jules Poulain	205	8.5
TUSC	Kevin Kayes	102	4.2
Majority		452	18.8
Turnout		2,405	28.7
Labour hold			

=== Woolston ===
Woolston (2)
Party	Candidate	Votes	%
Labour	Sue Blatchford	1,407	49.6
Labour	Chris Hammond	1,279	
Conservative	Alex Fiuza	695	24.5
Conservative	Joe Spencer	667	
Liberal Democrats	Colin Bleach	269	9.5
TUSC	Sue Atkins	213	7.5
Green	Katherine Barbour	213	7.5
Green	Ronald Meldrum	140	
TUSC	Graham Henry	125	
Liberal Democrats	Keith Reed	123	
Turnout		2,834	28.3
Labour hold			
Labour hold			

Preceded by 2015 Southampton City Council election	Southampton City Council elections	Succeeded by 2018 Southampton City Council election
