= 2021 Southampton City Council election =

2021 UK local government election

| ← 2019 | 6 May 2021 | 2022 → |

16 of the 48 seats to Southampton City Council 25 seats needed for a majority
| | First party | Second party | Third party |
|---|---|---|---|
| Leader | Dan Fitzhenry | Christopher Hammond | N/A |
| Party | Conservative | Labour | Independent |
| Leader's seat | Harefield | Woolston | N/A |
| Last election | 5 (2016) | 12 (2016) | 1 (2016) |
| Seats before | 18 | 29 | 1 |
| Seats won | 11 | 5 | 0 |
| Seats after | 25 | 23 | 0 |
| Seat change | ▲7 | ▼6 | ▼1 |
- Map showing the results of the 2021 Southampton City Council election
Council control before election
Labour
Council control after election
Conservative

The 2021 Southampton City Council election took place on 6 May 2021, on the same day as other local elections, to elect members of Southampton City Council. The election was originally due to take place in May 2020, to elect the seats of councillors last elected in 2016, but was postponed due to the COVID-19 pandemic.

Council elections for the Southampton City Council were last held on 2 May 2019 as part of the 2019 United Kingdom local elections. The 2019 Southampton City Council election resulted in an increased number of seats for the Labour Party, from 26 to 29.

All locally registered electors (British, Irish, Commonwealth and European Union citizens) who are aged 18 or over on polling day were entitled to vote in the local elections.

The Statement of Persons Nominated was published on Friday 9 April 2021.

The Conservatives gained 6 seats from the Labour Party and one seat from an Independent giving them a total of 25 seats on the new council, as compared with 23 seats for Labour. This gave the Conservative Party control of the council for the first time since 2012.

In the Ward results which appear below, increases/decreases in shares of the vote, and resultant swings, are calculated by reference to the 2016 election, when these seats were last fought.

== Results summary ==
2021 Southampton City Council election
| Party | This election | | | Full council | | | This election | | |
| Party | Seats | Net | Seats % | Other | Total | Total % | Votes | Votes % | +/− |
|---|---|---|---|---|---|---|---|---|---|
| Conservative | 11 | ▲7 | 68.8 | 14 | 25 | 52.1 | 24,119 | 42.8 | +11.5 |
| Labour | 5 | ▼6 | 31.3 | 18 | 23 | 47.9 | 21,281 | 37.8 | -3.9 |
| Green | 0 | Steady | 0.0 | 0 | 0 | 0.0 | 5,118 | 9.1 | +3.0 |
| Liberal Democrats | 0 | Steady | 0.0 | 0 | 0 | 0.0 | 4,760 | 8.5 | +1.5 |
| TUSC | 0 | Steady | 0.0 | 0 | 0 | 0.0 | 590 | 1.0 | -0.9 |
| Independent | 0 | ▼1 | 0.0 | 0 | 0 | 0.0 | 281 | 0.5 | -3.6 |
| Hampshire Independents | 0 | Steady | 0.0 | 0 | 0 | 0.0 | 98 | 0.2 | New |
| Reform UK | 0 | Steady | 0.0 | 0 | 0 | 0.0 | 61 | 0.1 | New |

== Ward results ==
Bargate
| Party | Candidate | Votes | % | ±% |
|---|---|---|---|---|
| Labour Co-op | Darren Paffey | 1,493 | 46.0 | −0.5 |
| Conservative | Charles Perez-Storey | 992 | 30.6 | −0.8 |
| Green | Joe Cox | 338 | 10.4 | +2.4 |
| Liberal Democrats | Josh Smith | 214 | 6.6 | +1.6 |
| Hampshire Independents | Kim Rose | 98 | 3.0 | N/A |
| TUSC | Graham Henry | 66 | 2.0 | N/A |
| Majority | | 501 | 15.4 | |
| Turnout | | 3,244 | 24.14 | +1.75 |
| Labour hold | | Swing | +0.2 | |

Bassett
| Party | Candidate | Votes | % | ±% |
|---|---|---|---|---|
| Conservative | John Hannides | 1,795 | 44.4 | −3.0 |
| Liberal Democrats | Richard Blackman | 1,373 | 34.0 | +0.6 |
| Labour | Ashley Minto | 614 | 15.2 | −2.6 |
| Green | Steve Gore | 204 | 5.0 | −1.7 |
| TUSC | Mike Marx | 24 | 0.6 | −0.3 |
| Majority | | 422 | 10.4 | |
| Turnout | | 4,041 | 40.42 | +9.22 |
| Conservative hold | | Swing | -6.9 | |

Bevois
| Party | Candidate | Votes | % | ±% |
|---|---|---|---|---|
| Labour | Mike Denness | 1,914 | 58.4 | −10.8 |
| Conservative | Michaela Dowse | 517 | 15.8 | +4.0 |
| Green | Ronald Meldrum | 329 | 10.0 | +2.4 |
| No description | Sam Shahid | 281 | 8.6 | N/A |
| Liberal Democrats | Vijay Chopra | 167 | 5.1 | +1.0 |
| TUSC | Larry Kazingizi | 40 | 1.2 | +0.1 |
| Majority | | 1,397 | 42.6 | |
| Turnout | | 3,279 | 27.53 | +1.13 |
| Labour hold | | Swing | -7.4 | |

Bitterne
| Party | Candidate | Votes | % | ±% |
|---|---|---|---|---|
| Conservative | Matt Magee | 1,642 | 55.5 | +17.3 |
| Labour | Andy Frampton | 999 | 33.7 | −0.1 |
| Green | Michael Mawle | 182 | 6.1 | −1.3 |
| Liberal Democrats | Alex Clifton-Melhuish | 116 | 3.9 | −1.2 |
| Majority | | 643 | 21.8 | |
| Turnout | | 2,961 | 29.44 | +1.53 |
| Conservative gain from Labour | | Swing | +8.7 | |

Bitterne Park
| Party | Candidate | Votes | % | ±% |
|---|---|---|---|---|
| Conservative | Ivan White | 1,927 | 49.0 | +7.0 |
| Labour | Victoria Ugwoeme | 1,213 | 30.9 | −5.8 |
| Green | Lindsi Bluemel | 533 | 13.6 | +3.3 |
| Liberal Democrats | Debbie Adebayo | 229 | 5.8 | −2.0 |
| Majority | | 714 | 18.1 | |
| Turnout | | 3,929 | 37.68 | +5.58 |
| Conservative hold | | Swing | +6.4 | |

Coxford
| Party | Candidate | Votes | % | ±% |
|---|---|---|---|---|
| Conservative | Diana Galton | 1,723 | 52.4 | +40.8 |
| Labour | Amanda Ford | 1,090 | 33.1 | +6.0 |
| Liberal Democrats | Sam Chapman | 229 | 7.0 | +3.7 |
| Green | Joelle Hawes | 162 | 4.9 | +2.8 |
| TUSC | Maggie Fricker | 63 | 1.9 | N/A |
| Majority | | 633 | 19.3 | |
| Turnout | | 3,291 | 32.08 | −1.1 |
| Conservative gain from Independent | | Swing | +17.4 | |

Freemantle
| Party | Candidate | Votes | % | ±% |
|---|---|---|---|---|
| Labour Co-op | David Shields | 1,728 | 45.7 | −1.6 |
| Conservative | Vikkie Cheng | 1,201 | 31.8 | +0.8 |
| Green | Laura Crawford | 420 | 11.1 | +3.6 |
| Liberal Democrats | Andrew Beal | 292 | 7.7 | +2.5 |
| Reform UK | Guy Ireland | 61 | 1.6 | N/A |
| TUSC | Catherine Clarke | 58 | 1.5 | N/A |
| Majority | | 527 | 13.9 | |
| Turnout | | 3,781 | 32.59 | −0.5 |
| Labour hold | | Swing | -1.2 | |

Harefield
| Party | Candidate | Votes | % | ±% |
|---|---|---|---|---|
| Conservative | Peter Baillie | 2,020 | 56.3 | +9.8 |
| Labour Co-op | Alan Lloyd | 1,221 | 34.0 | +1.9 |
| Green | Chris Bluemel | 220 | 6.1 | −1.4 |
| Liberal Democrats | Catrine McDougall | 117 | 3.3 | −2.9 |
| Majority | | 799 | 22.3 | |
| Turnout | | 3,590 | 34.13 | +2.0 |
| Conservative hold | | Swing | +4.0 | |

Millbrook
| Party | Candidate | Votes | % | ±% |
|---|---|---|---|---|
| Conservative | Jeremy Moulton | 1,804 | 49.7 | +13.3 |
| Labour Co-op | Lisa Fricker | 1,314 | 36.2 | −5.2 |
| Green | Jonathan Bean | 326 | 9.0 | +4.8 |
| Liberal Democrats | Nicholas McGeorge | 159 | 4.4 | −0.2 |
| Majority | | 490 | 13.5 | |
| Turnout | | 3,632 | 32.60 | −1.4 |
| Conservative gain from Labour | | Swing | +9.3 | |

Peartree
| Party | Candidate | Votes | % | ±% |
|---|---|---|---|---|
| Conservative | Joshua Payne | 1,910 | 47.5 | +15.5 |
| Labour | Eamonn Keogh | 1,696 | 42.2 | −2.8 |
| Green | Rosanna Newey | 193 | 4.8 | +0.4 |
| Liberal Democrats | Robert Naish | 166 | 4.1 | −0.8 |
| TUSC | Bevis Fenner | 35 | 0.9 | +0.3 |
| Majority | | 214 | 5.3 | |
| Turnout | | 4,020 | 38.45 | +2.7 |
| Conservative gain from Labour | | Swing | +9.2 | |

Portswood
| Party | Candidate | Votes | % | ±% |
|---|---|---|---|---|
| Labour | John Savage | 1,455 | 36.4 | +3.1 |
| Green | Katherine Barbour | 1,082 | 27.1 | +17.7 |
| Liberal Democrats | James Read | 718 | 18.0 | −6.8 |
| Conservative | Calvin Smith | 670 | 16.8 | −8.8 |
| TUSC | Tony Twine | 39 | 1.0 | 0 |
| Majority | | 373 | 9.3 | |
| Turnout | | 3,996 | 36.86 | +4.4 |
| Labour hold | | Swing | -7.3 | |

Redbridge
| Party | Candidate | Votes | % | ±% |
|---|---|---|---|---|
| Conservative | Amanda Guest | 1,577 | 47.1 | +32.7 |
| Labour | Lee Whitbread | 1,480 | 44.2 | −2.2 |
| Green | Kathryn Cook | 116 | 3.5 | +1.0 |
| Liberal Democrats | Simon Stokes | 102 | 3.0 | −0.3 |
| TUSC | Peter Wyatt | 48 | 1.4 | N/A |
| Majority | | 97 | 2.9 | |
| Turnout | | 3,348 | 30.18 | +1.2 |
| Conservative gain from Labour | | Swing | +17.5 | |

Shirley
| Party | Candidate | Votes | % | ±% |
|---|---|---|---|---|
| Labour | Mark Chaloner | 1,790 | 42.9 | −3.3 |
| Conservative | Andrew Hetherton | 1,558 | 37.2 | +9.9 |
| Liberal Democrats | Colin McDougall | 409 | 9.8 | +3.8 |
| Green | Lucy Mundell | 341 | 8.2 | +3.5 |
| TUSC | Andrew Howe | 40 | 1.0 | N/A |
| Majority | | 232 | 5.7 | |
| Turnout | | 4,171 | 39.30 | −1.9 |
| Labour hold | | Swing | -6.6 | |

Sholing
| Party | Candidate | Votes | % | ±% |
|---|---|---|---|---|
| Conservative | James Baillie | 2,163 | 61.4 | +21.1 |
| Labour | Elaine Fullaway | 995 | 28.2 | −7.7 |
| Green | Helen Makrakis | 197 | 5.6 | +2.3 |
| Liberal Democrats | Roland Dauncey | 128 | 3.6 | +0.5 |
| TUSC | Declan Clune | 65 | 1.8 | +0.4 |
| Majority | | 1,168 | 33.2 | |
| Turnout | | 3,524 | 32.86 | −1.1 |
| Conservative hold | | Swing | +14.4 | |

Swaythling
| Party | Candidate | Votes | % | ±% |
|---|---|---|---|---|
| Conservative | Spiros Vassiliou | 1,046 | 40.3 | +11.5 |
| Labour Co-op | Sharon Mintoff | 1,026 | 39.5 | −8.1 |
| Green | Angela Cotton | 265 | 10.2 | +0.2 |
| Liberal Democrats | Sarah Wood | 194 | 7.5 | −1.0 |
| TUSC | Nick Chaffey | 38 | 1.5 | −2.7 |
| Majority | | 20 | 0.8 | |
| Turnout | | 2,596 | 30.52 | +1.8 |
| Conservative gain from Labour | | Swing | +9.8 | |

Woolston
| Party | Candidate | Votes | % | ±% |
|---|---|---|---|---|
| Conservative | Rob Stead | 1,584 | 48.1 | +23.6 |
| Labour | Sue Blatchford | 1,253 | 38.1 | −11.5 |
| Green | Clive Hillman | 210 | 6.4 | −1.1 |
| Liberal Democrats | Colin Bleach | 147 | 4.5 | −5.0 |
| TUSC | Sue Atkins | 74 | 2.2 | −5.3 |
| Majority | | 331 | 10.0 | |
| Turnout | | 3,293 | 29.34 | +1.0 |
| Conservative gain from Labour | | Swing | +17.6 | |
