= 2024 Southampton City Council election =

English local election

- 2 May 2024

17 out of 51 seats to Southampton City Council 26 seats needed for a majority

	First party	Second party	Third party
Leader	Lorna Fielker	Daniel Fitzhenry	Richard Blackman
Party	Labour	Conservative	Liberal Democrats
Last election	38 seats, 45.5%	9 seats, 33.4%	3 seats, 12.7%
Seats before	37	9	3
Seats after	36	10	4
Seat change	▼1	▲1	▲1
	Fourth party	Fifth party
Party	Green	Independent
Last election	1 seat, 6.6%	0 seats, 0.2%
Seats before	1	1
Seats after	1	0
Seat change	Steady	▼1
- Winner of each seat at the 2024 Southampton City Council election
Leader before election
Lorna Fielker
Labour
Leader after election
Lorna Fielker
Labour

The 2024 Southampton City Council election took place on 2 May 2024 to elect members of Southampton City Council in Hampshire, England. This was on the same day as other local elections.

Labour retained their majority on the council.

The Conservative leader of the opposition, Dan Fitzhenry, did not stand for re-election. The Conservatives chose Peter Baillie to be their new group leader after the election.

== Summary ==
=== Election result ===
2024 Southampton City Council election
Party	This election				Full council			This election		
Party	Candidates	Seats	Net	Seats %	Other	Total	Total %	Votes	Votes %	+/−
Labour	{{{candidates}}}	12	▼1	70.6	24	36	70.6	19,148	39.9	-5.6
Conservative	{{{candidates}}}	3	▲1	17.6	7	10	19.6	14,259	29.7	-3.7
Liberal Democrats	{{{candidates}}}	2	▲1	11.8	2	4	7.8	6,073	12.7	+0.0
Green	{{{candidates}}}	0	Steady	0.0	1	1	2.0	4,406	9.2	+2.6
TUSC	{{{candidates}}}	0	Steady	0.0	0	0	0.0	1,920	4.0	+2.8
Reform	{{{candidates}}}	0	Steady	0.0	0	0	0.0	1,727	3.6	+3.1
Independent	{{{candidates}}}	0	▼1	0.0	0	0	0.0	N/A	N/A	N/A

== Ward results ==
=== Banister & Polygon ===
Banister & Polygon
Party	Candidate	Votes	%	±%
Labour Co-op	Vivienne Windle*	1,006	46.1	−3.3
Conservative	Scott Davis	491	22.5	+0.1
Green	Ellis Jackson	337	15.4	−4.1
Liberal Democrats	Andy Beal	261	12.0	−1.8
TUSC	Karen Rogers	89	4.1	−1.3
Majority		515	23.6	
Turnout		2,197	26.5	–1.6
Registered electors		8,288		
Labour Co-op hold		Swing		

=== Bargate ===
Bargate
Party	Candidate	Votes	%	±%
Labour	Ginnie Lambert	936	50.2	+4.7
Conservative	Matt Jones	497	26.6	+0.7
Green	Joe Cox	208	11.1	−1.7
Liberal Democrats	Reuben Hinchliffe	139	7.4	+1.3
TUSC	Donna Dee	86	4.6	+1.0
Majority		439	23.5	
Turnout		1,884	22.2	–0.7
Registered electors		8,486		
Labour hold		Swing		

=== Bassett ===
Bassett
Party	Candidate	Votes	%	±%
Liberal Democrats	Sarah Wood*	1,481	43.9	−4.3
Conservative	Amanda Guest	964	28.6	−4.8
Labour	Lawrence Coomber	485	14.4	+1.7
Green	Helen Makrakis	198	5.9	N/A
Reform	Tom Randall	194	5.8	+0.4
TUSC	Aziz Dieng	49	1.5	N/A
Majority		517	15.3	
Turnout		3,392	36.2	–4.1
Registered electors		9,361		
Liberal Democrats hold		Swing		

=== Bevois ===
Bevois
Party	Candidate	Votes	%	±%
Labour	Jacqui Rayment*	1,281	48.6	−10.7
TUSC	Nadia Ditta	848	32.2	+27.8
Green	Rosanna Newey	214	8.1	−9.6
Conservative	Richard Palmer	192	7.3	−1.7
Liberal Democrats	Tom Wintrell	102	3.9	−4.9
Majority		433	16.4	
Turnout		2,681	30.4	+3.2
Registered electors		8,795		
Labour hold		Swing		

=== Bitterne Park ===
Bitterne Park
Party	Candidate	Votes	%	±%
Labour	Gordon Cooper	1,634	42.8	+0.4
Conservative	David Fuller	1,545	40.4	−0.2
Green	Lindsi Bluemel	338	8.8	−6.3
Reform	Adrian Royle	160	4.2	N/A
Liberal Democrats	Nick Myers	142	3.7	−3.1
TUSC	Graham Henry	63	1.6	−2.0
Majority		89	2.3	
Turnout		3,899	37.3	
Registered electors		10,459		
Labour hold		Swing		

=== Coxford ===
Coxford
Party	Candidate	Votes	%	±%
Labour Co-op	Beccy Greenhalgh*	1,062	37.2	−1.0
Conservative	Paul Nolan	1,016	35.6	+2.0
Reform	Guy Ireland	256	9.0	N/A
Liberal Democrats	Ellen McGeorge	213	7.5	−2.7
Green	Joanne Clements	176	6.2	+0.6
TUSC	Maggie Fricker	43	1.5	±0.0
Majority		46	1.6	
Turnout		2,873	30.3	+7.1
Registered electors		9,982		
Labour Co-op hold		Swing		

=== Freemantle ===
Freemantle
Party	Candidate	Votes	%	±%
Labour Co-op	Christie Lambert*	1,339	49.9	−4.3
Conservative	Diana Galton	578	21.5	−1.7
Green	John Spottiswoode	275	10.2	−7.9
Liberal Democrats	Chris Shank	234	8.7	+2.9
Reform	Katrina de Chazal	174	6.5	+2.4
TUSC	Catherine Clarke	84	3.1	−2.3
Majority		761	28.4	
Turnout		2,701	28.2	–0.2
Registered electors		9,574		
Labour Co-op hold		Swing		

=== Harefield ===
Harefield
Party	Candidate	Votes	%	±%
Conservative	Rob Harwood	1,219	43.5	+0.7
Labour	Paul Kenny	1,018	36.3	−0.6
Liberal Democrats	Martyn Cooper	303	10.8	+1.1
Green	Chris Bluemel	177	6.3	−4.7
TUSC	Barbara Webber	100	3.6	+0.7
Majority		201	7.2	
Turnout		2,831	28.2	–2.2
Registered electors		9,738		
Conservative hold		Swing		

=== Millbrook ===
Millbrook
Party	Candidate	Votes	%	±%
Labour	Christian Cox*	1,042	41.6	−0.3
Conservative	Vikkie Cheng	1,014	40.5	−0.5
Green	Richard Fricker	222	8.9	−2.7
Liberal Democrats	Andrew Landells	151	6.0	−4.3
TUSC	Andrew Howe	76	3.0	−0.6
Majority		28	1.1	
Turnout		2,520	26.8	–2.0
Registered electors		9,396		
Labour hold		Swing		

=== Peartree ===
Peartree
Party	Candidate	Votes	%	±%
Labour Co-op	Simon Letts*	1,305	40.9	+5.0
Conservative	Susan Spencer	1,142	35.8	+0.8
Reform	Sam Wright	305	9.6	N/A
Green	Lori Foster	219	6.9	−3.8
Liberal Democrats	Tara Foster	182	5.7	−3.6
TUSC	Michael Marx	34	1.1	−1.4
Majority		163	5.1	
Turnout		3,202	30.0	–2.6
Registered electors		10,687		
Labour Co-op hold		Swing		

=== Portswood ===
Portswood
Party	Candidate	Votes	%	±%
Labour	John Savage*	1,401	46.3	+9.0
Green	Neil Kelly	880	29.1	+3.1
Conservative	Nicholas Moulton	365	12.1	−7.5
Liberal Democrats	John Langran	197	6.5	+0.7
Reform	Caroline Jobson	114	3.8	+1.3
TUSC	Tony Twine	67	2.2	−0.1
Majority		521	17.2	
Turnout		3,034	36.5	–3.8
Registered electors		8,308		
Labour hold		Swing		

=== Redbridge ===
Redbridge
Party	Candidate	Votes	%	±%
Labour	Eugene McManus	1,157	51.5	+4.6
Conservative	Dave Smith	520	23.2	−7.9
Reform	John Edwards	276	12.3	+5.8
Green	Lisa Fricker	147	6.5	−2.1
Liberal Democrats	Simon Stokes	125	5.6	−0.3
TUSC	Pete Wyatt	20	0.9	−2.3
Majority		637	28.4	
Turnout		2,254	23.6	–1.3
Registered electors		9,542		
Labour hold		Swing		

=== Shirley ===
Shirley
Party	Candidate	Votes	%	±%
Labour	Alice Kloker	1,458	39.5	−2.0
Conservative	Andrew Hetherton	933	25.3	−8.1
Liberal Democrats	George Percival	734	19.9	+7.5
Green	Lucy Allotey	262	7.1	−7.2
Reform	Philip Crook	248	6.7	N/A
TUSC	Parveen Ishfaq	54	1.5	−0.9
Majority		525	14.2	
Turnout		3,703	36.1	–1.3
Registered electors		10,262		
Labour hold		Swing		

=== Sholing ===
Sholing
Party	Candidate	Votes	%	±%
Conservative	Jaden Beaurain*	1,367	46.2	+4.3
Labour	Gillian Green	1,002	33.9	−1.7
Liberal Democrats	Sharon Hopkins	348	11.8	+0.6
Green	Emma Davis	185	6.3	−4.4
TUSC	Declan Clune	57	1.9	−1.5
Majority		365	12.3	
Turnout		2,995	29.0	–0.9
Registered electors		10,339		
Conservative hold		Swing		

=== Swaythling ===
Swaythling
Party	Candidate	Votes	%	±%
Liberal Democrats	Thomas Gravatt	1,116	42.1	+24.7
Labour	Sharon Mintoff*	808	30.5	−15.4
Conservative	Robert Painton	407	15.4	−5.9
Green	Angela Cotton	246	9.3	−8.7
TUSC	Nick Chaffey	72	2.7	−1.9
Majority		308	11.6	
Turnout		2,681	31.0	+1.2
Registered electors		8,634		
Liberal Democrats gain from Labour		Swing		

=== Thornhill ===
Thornhill
Party	Candidate	Votes	%	±%
Labour	Josh Allen*	1,166	47.9	+3.2
Conservative	Callum Ford	924	37.9	−1.2
Liberal Democrats	Edward Bolton	142	5.8	−0.9
Green	Michael Mawle	126	5.2	−2.3
TUSC	Clara Asher	78	3.2	+0.7
Majority		242	9.9	
Turnout		2,451	25.1	–0.7
Registered electors		9,763		
Labour hold		Swing		

=== Woolston ===
Woolston
Party	Candidate	Votes	%	±%
Conservative	Rob Stead	1,085	41.2	+6.0
Labour	Victoria Ugwoeme*	1,048	39.8	−1.0
Liberal Democrats	Francis Hedley	203	7.7	−0.3
Green	Caitlin Steege	196	7.5	−7.1
TUSC	Sue Atkins	100	3.8	−1.2
Majority		37	1.4	
Turnout		2,658	25.4	–1.5
Registered electors		10,451		
Conservative gain from Labour		Swing		

== By-elections ==
=== Shirley (October 2024) ===
Shirley by-election: 10 October 2024
Party	Candidate	Votes	%	±%
Liberal Democrats	George Percival	1,249	39.2	+19.3
Conservative	Andrew Hetherton	770	24.2	–1.1
Labour	Victoria Ugwoeme	764	24.0	–15.5
Green	Barrie Margetts	241	7.6	+0.5
Independent	Andrew Pope	117	3.7	N/A
TUSC	Maggie Fricker	44	1.4	–0.1
Majority		479	15.0	N/A
Turnout		3,185		
Liberal Democrats gain from Labour		Swing	▲10.2	

=== Shirley (February 2026) ===
Shirley by-election: 26 February 2026
Party	Candidate	Votes	%	±%
Reform	Paul Chance	681	19.0%	
Labour	James Clark	954	26.7%	
Green	Joanne Clements	539	15.1%	
TUSC	David Cowley	16	0.4%	
Conservative	Andy Palmer	288	8.1%	
Ind. Network	Andrew Pope	122	3.4%	
Liberal Democrats	Chris Shank	975	27.3%	
