= Satvir Kaur =

British politician

Satvir Kaur MP
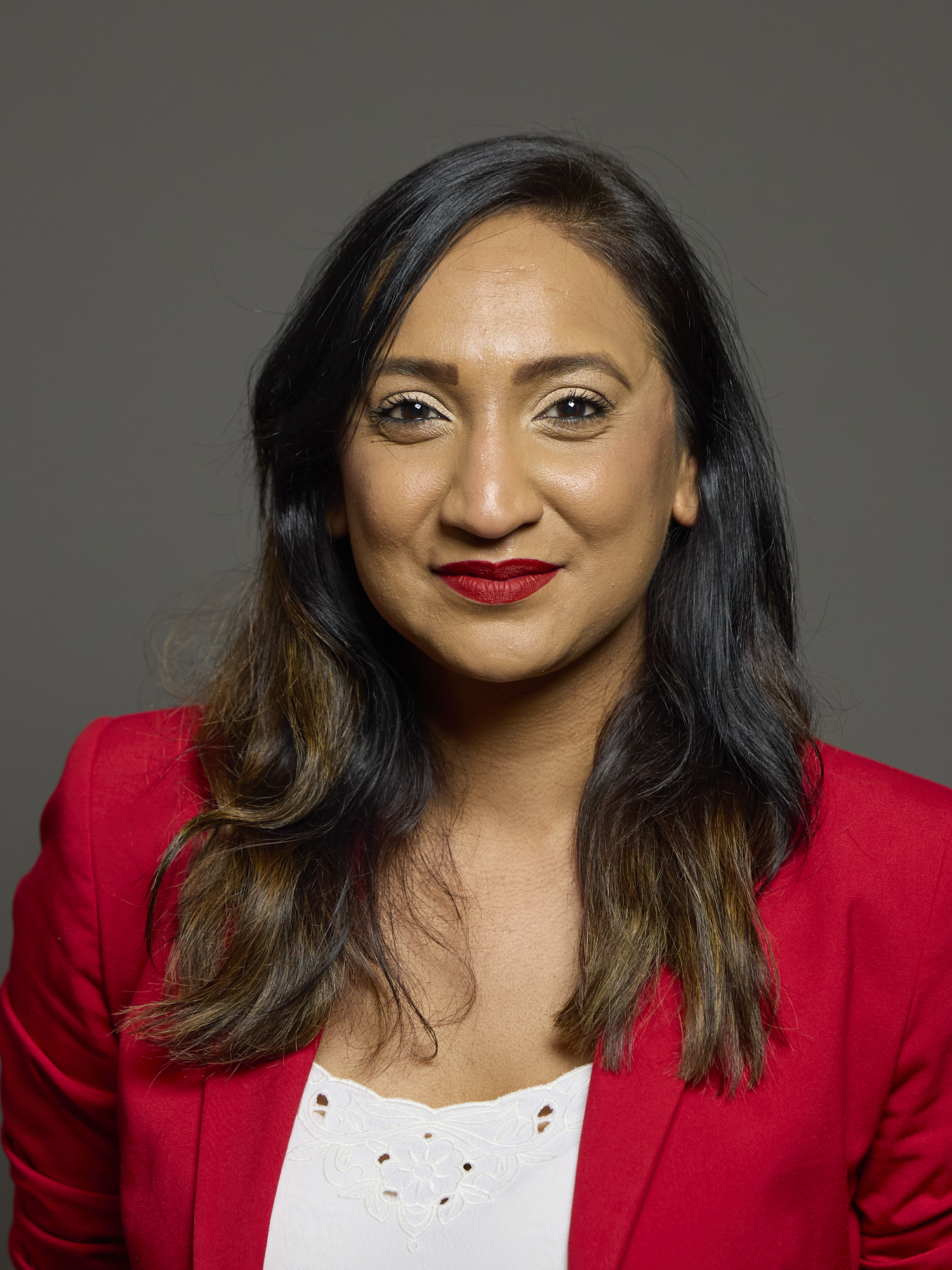
- Official portrait, 2024

Parliamentary Under-Secretary of State for Safeguarding and Violence Against Women and Girls
- Incumbent
- Assumed office 22 July 2026
- Prime Minister: Andy Burnham
- Preceded by: Natalie Fleet

Parliamentary Under-Secretary of State for Equalities
- Incumbent
- Assumed office 22 July 2026
- Prime Minister: Andy Burnham
- Preceded by: Seema Malhotra

Parliamentary Secretary for the Cabinet Office
- In office 6 September 2025 – 22 July 2026 Serving with Chris Ward, Josh Simons (until February 2026), Ruth Anderson (from March 2026), James Frith (from 2026)
- Prime Minister: Keir Starmer
- Preceded by: Georgia Gould; Abena Oppong-Asare

Member of Parliament for Southampton Test
- Incumbent
- Assumed office 4 July 2024
- Preceded by: Alan Whitehead
- Majority: 9,333 (26.0%)

Leader of Southampton City Council
- In office 18 May 2022 – 20 December 2023
- Preceded by: Daniel Fitzhenry
- Succeeded by: Lorna Fielker

Member of Southampton City Council for Shirley
- In office 6 May 2011 – 29 August 2024
- Preceded by: Matthew Dean
- Succeeded by: George Percival

Personal details
- Born: Southampton, Hampshire, England
- Party: Labour
- Education: University of Southampton; Solent University

Satvir Kaur (born September 1984) is a British Labour Party politician serving as the Member of Parliament for Southampton Test since 2024. She previously served as Leader of Southampton City Council from 2022 to 2023, being the first female Sikh leader of a local authority in Britain. She also represented Shirley on the City Council from 2011 until 2024.

== Early life and education ==
Kaur was born and raised in Southampton, England. Her family owned a sari shop in the Bevois area of the city.

Kaur was educated at Mount Pleasant Juniors and St Anne's Catholic School. She graduated with a degree in Modern History and Politics from the University of Southampton, and later Law from Solent University.

== Political career ==
At the 2011 local elections, Kaur was elected to represent Shirley ward on Southampton City Council. She gained the seat from the incumbent Conservative, and was re-elected in 2015 and 2019. Kaur campaigned for Hillary Clinton in the state of North Carolina ahead of the 2016 presidential election.

After Labour lost control of Southampton City Council in 2021, she was elected as leader of the Labour group. Kaur became council leader once Labour regained their majority in 2022. She was the first female Sikh council leader in Britain.

Kaur was selected as Labour's prospective parliamentary candidate for Southampton Test in July 2022. Later that year, she introduced party leader Keir Starmer ahead of his speech at the Labour Party Conference.

In May 2023, Kaur stated as City Council leader that "we are not facing bankruptcy. To say otherwise is a lie and political opportunism". In July 2023, Southampton City Council alerted the government over a financial emergency.

In December 2023, Kaur announced that she was stepping down as council leader in order to focus on campaigning for the general election. She was succeeded by her deputy leader, Lorna Fielker.

In July 2024 she was elected as the Member of Parliament for Southampton Test, succeeding Alan Whitehead. She later resigned her seat on the council. The by-election to replace her was held on 10 October 2024. The seat was won by Liberal Democrat candidate George Percival.

In the 2025 British cabinet reshuffle, Kaur was appointed Parliamentary Secretary for the Cabinet Office. Josh Simons covered her portfolio while she was on maternity leave under the standing orders of Ministerial and other Maternity Allowances Act 2021 until 22 February 2026. On 22 July 2026, she was appointed Parliamentary Under-Secretary of State for Safeguarding and Violence Against Women and Girls at the Home Office by new Prime Minister Andy Burnham.

== Political views ==
Kaur supports establishing an investment zone in Southampton. She has spoken at an event marking the positive contribution of refugees to her city.

In September 2024, Kaur voted with the government in favour of cutting the winter fuel allowance. In November 2024, Kaur voted against the Terminally Ill Adults (End of Life) Bill.

== Personal life ==
Satvir Kaur is the youngest of five children. In August 2025, she and her husband announced the birth of their first child.
