= 1999 Southampton City Council election =

1999 UK local government election

The 1999 Southampton Council election took place on 6 May 1999 to elect members of Southampton Unitary Council in Hampshire, England. One third of the council was up for election and the Labour party stayed in overall control of the council.

After the election, the composition of the council was

- Labour 27
- Liberal Democrat 14
- Conservative 4

== Election result ==
The results saw the Labour party stay in control of the council after holding all but one of the seats they had been defending. The only change came in St Lukes ward where Conservative Conor Burns gained the seat from Labour. Overall turnout in the election was 26.4%.

Southampton local election result 1999
Party	Seats	Gains	Losses	Net gain/loss	Seats %	Votes %	Votes	+/−
Labour	8	0	1	-1	53.3	40.2	17,630	-4.1%
Liberal Democrats	5	0	0	0	33.3	29.2	12,798	+0.0%
Conservative	2	1	0	+1	13.3	23.6	10,357	+1.5%
Independent	0	0	0	0	0	4.0	1,754	+1.8%
Green	0	0	0	0	0	1.9	840	+1.0%
Independent Ratepayer	0	0	0	0	0	0.7	312	+0.7%
Residents Action	0	0	0	0	0	0.3	119	+0.3%
Socialist Alternative	0	0	0	0	0	0.1	44	+0.1%

== Ward results ==
Bargate
Party	Candidate	Votes	%	±%
Labour	Derek Burke	1,157	47.9	−7.2
Conservative	Andrew Browning	399	16.5	−3.0
Independent	Mohammad Aslam	339	14.0	+14.0
Liberal Democrats	Nigel Impey	248	10.3	+0.2
Residents Action	Lorraine Barter	119	4.9	+4.9
Independent	Kim Rose	111	4.6	−6.5
Socialist Alternative	David Rawlinson	44	1.8	−2.5
Majority		758	31.4	−4.2
Turnout		2,417	19.0	
Labour hold		Swing		

Bassett
Party	Candidate	Votes	%	±%
Conservative	Alec Samuels	1,544	52.7	+3.1
Labour	Benjamin Steinberg	907	30.9	−7.2
Liberal Democrats	Terence Holden-Brown	481	16.4	+4.2
Majority		637	21.7	+10.2
Turnout		2,932	24.0	
Conservative hold		Swing		

Bitterne
Party	Candidate	Votes	%	±%
Labour	Kevin Masters	1,332	53.8	−7.4
Conservative	Royston Smith	770	31.1	+5.8
Liberal Democrats	Norman Kingswell	373	15.1	+1.6
Majority		562	22.7	−13.2
Turnout		2,475	27.1	
Labour hold		Swing		

Bitterne Park
Party	Candidate	Votes	%	±%
Liberal Democrats	David Beckett	1,861	50.5	+3.6
Independent	Peter Baillie	1,031	28.0	+1.5
Labour	Michael Drain	498	13.5	−3.6
Conservative	Brynley Williams	294	8.0	−1.5
Majority		830	22.5	+2.1
Turnout		3,684	31.7	
Liberal Democrats hold		Swing		

Coxford
Party	Candidate	Votes	%	±%
Liberal Democrats	Peter Galton	1,558	45.9	−2.1
Labour	Ceren Davis	1,498	44.2	+3.3
Conservative	Marie Heracleous	336	9.9	−1.2
Majority		60	1.8	−5.3
Turnout		3,392	29.2	
Liberal Democrats hold		Swing		

Freemantle
Party	Candidate	Votes	%	±%
Labour	Richard Harris	1,309	51.6	−1.2
Conservative	Jeremy Moulton	694	27.4	−0.7
Liberal Democrats	Tom Lawrence	343	13.5	−0.9
Green	John Spottiswoode	191	7.5	+2.8
Majority		615	24.2	−0.5
Turnout		2,537	24.1	
Labour hold		Swing		

Harefield
Party	Candidate	Votes	%	±%
Labour	Dennis Harryman	1,357	43.5	−8.1
Conservative	John Hartwell	1,350	43.3	+9.1
Liberal Democrats	Sharon Mintoff	333	10.7	+2.2
Green	Andrew Shaw	78	2.5	+0.4
Majority		7	0.2	−17.3
Turnout		3,118	31.2	
Labour hold		Swing		

Millbrook
Party	Candidate	Votes	%	±%
Liberal Democrats	George Melrose	1,433	54.1	−2.7
Labour	Derek Parsons	845	31.9	+1.0
Conservative	Edward Daunt	371	14.0	+1.6
Majority		588	22.2	−3.7
Turnout		2,649	26.7	
Liberal Democrats hold		Swing		

Peartree
Party	Candidate	Votes	%	±%
Liberal Democrats	Norah Goss	1,579	46.6	−7.9
Labour	Matthew Stevens	1,166	34.4	−1.0
Conservative	Graham Cotton	331	9.8	−0.3
Independent Ratepayer	Graham Cotton	312	9.2	+9.2
Majority		413	12.2	−6.9
Turnout		3,388	31.9	
Liberal Democrats hold		Swing		

Portswood
Party	Candidate	Votes	%	±%
Liberal Democrats	Jill Baston	1,721	55.8	−2.0
Labour	Jayne Laysan	723	23.5	−5.2
Conservative	Michael Ball	436	14.1	+0.6
Green	Adam Boardman	203	6.6	+6.6
Majority		998	32.4	+3.4
Turnout		3,083	28.3	
Liberal Democrats hold		Swing		

Redbridge
Party	Candidate	Votes	%	±%
Labour	Paul Russell	1,422	63.7	−3.7
Conservative	Julian Isaacson	422	18.9	+2.7
Liberal Democrats	Edward Blake	389	17.4	+1.0
Majority		1,000	44.8	−6.3
Turnout		2,233	21.8	
Labour hold		Swing		

Shirley
Party	Candidate	Votes	%	±%
Labour	William Kearns	1,404	44.3	+1.2
Conservative	Brian Parnell	1,191	37.6	+1.8
Liberal Democrats	Sarah Neely	429	13.5	−4.2
Green	Peter Davis	143	4.5	+1.1
Majority		213	6.7	−0.7
Turnout		3,167	32.1	
Labour hold		Swing		

Sholing
Party	Candidate	Votes	%	±%
Labour	Susan Blatchford	1,795	58.0	−1.0
Conservative	Marlene Unwin	884	28.6	+1.5
Liberal Democrats	Allan Nelson	416	13.4	−0.5
Majority		911	29.4	−2.5
Turnout		3,095	26.3	
Labour hold		Swing		

St. Lukes
Party	Candidate	Votes	%	±%
Conservative	Conor Burns	944	33.0	+5.8
Labour	John Truscott	850	29.7	−16.3
Liberal Democrats	Calvin Horner	566	19.8	+3.5
Independent	Sukhdev Sihota Singh	273	9.6	+9.6
Green	David Cromwell	225	7.9	+2.6
Majority		94	3.3	
Turnout		2,858	24.7	
Conservative gain from Labour		Swing		

Woolston
Party	Candidate	Votes	%	±%
Labour	Julian Price	1,367	48.4	−9.4
Liberal Democrats	David Simpson	1,068	37.8	+7.7
Conservative	Christos Harling-Melas	391	13.8	+1.7
Majority		299	10.6	−17.2
Turnout		2,826	24.5	
Labour hold		Swing		
