= LGBTQ wing =

An LGBTQ wing, also referred to using other variants of the initialism, is a subsidiary, autonomous, or independently allied front of a larger organization (usually a political party but occasionally another type of organization) that is formed in order to rally support for that organization from members and potential members of the LGBTQ community, as well as to focus on subjects and issues more widely relevant among that organization's wing. LGBTQ wings also provide information and guidance for the main party in issues regarding the LGBTQ community. Examples of this include such as marital and parental rights, health issues like HIV/AIDS, sexual healthcare and transgender health care, and freedom from discrimination in areas of employment and providing goods and services.

== List of LGBTQ wings by country or region ==
=== Australia ===
Name of organisation	Political Party	Ideology	References
Liberal Pride	Liberal Party of Australia	Conservatism	
Rainbow Labor	Australian Labor Party	Social democracy	

=== Canada ===
Name of organization	Political Party	Ideology	References
LGBTory	Conservative Party of Canada	Conservatism	

=== European Union ===
Name of organisation	Political Party	Ideology	References
EPPride	European People's Party	Conservatism	
European Queer Greens	European Green Party	Green politics	
Rainbow Rose	Party of European Socialists	Social democracy	

=== France ===
Name of organisation	Native name(s) of organisation	Political Party	Ideology	References
Centr'égaux	Centr'égaux	Democratic Movement	Social liberalism	
GayLib	GayLib	Radical Party (since 2018); Union of Democrats and Independents (2013–2018); Union for a Popular Movement (2002–2013); Liberal Democracy (2001-2002)	Liberalism	
Génération.s LGBTQIA+	Génération.s LGBTQIA+	Génération.s	Democratic socialism	
Homosexualities and Socialism	Homosexualités et Socialisme	Socialist Party (since 2015); Radical Party of the Left (since 2019)	Social democracy	
LGBT+ Progressives	Progressistes LGBT+	Renaissance; Democrats and Progressives; Agir; En Commun	Liberalism	
LGBTQIA+ Commission of The Ecologists	Commission LGBTQIA+ des Écologistes	The Ecologists	Green politics	
Proud and revolutionary	Fier·e·s et révolutionnaires	French Communist Party	Communism	

=== Germany ===
In German politics, political party wings are administratively managed in Arbeitsgemeinschaft or working groups, which some German states like Bavaria or North Rhine-Westphalia have special laws governing them hence the reference to the name.

Name of organisation	Native name(s) of organisation	Political Party	Ideology	References
Federal Working Group – The Left.queer	Bundesarbeitsgemeinschaft DIE LINKE.queer	The Left	Democratic socialism	
Lesbians and Gays in the Union	Lesben und Schwule in der Union	Christian Democratic Union; Christian Social Union	Christian democracy	
Queergreen – Federal Working Group on Gay Politics	Queergrün – Bundesarbeitsgemeinschaft Schwulenpolitik	Alliance 90/The Greens	Green politics	
SPD Working Group for Acceptance and Equality – SPD queer	Arbeitsgemeinschaft der SPD für Akzeptanz und Gleichstellung – SPD queer	Social Democratic Party of Germany	Social democracy	

=== Ireland ===
Name of organisation	Political Party	Ideology	References
Fine Gael LGBTQ+ Network	Fine Gael	Conservative liberalism	
Fianna Fáil LGBTQI+ Network	Fianna Fáil	Conservative liberalism	
Labour LGBTQ+	Labour Party	Social democracy	

=== Netherlands ===
Name of organisation	Native name(s) of organisation	Political Party	Ideology	References
CDA Pride	CDA Pride	Christian Democratic Appeal	Christian democracy	
CU4all	CU4all	Christian Union	Christian democracy	
Labour Party Pink Network	PvdA Roze Netwerk	Labour Party	Social democracy	
Pink50+	Roze50+	50PLUS	Pensioners' interests	
PinkLeft	RozeLinks	GreenLeft	Green politics	
PRIDE66	PRIDE66	Democrats 66	Social liberalism	
QueerVolt NL	QueerVolt NL	Volt Netherlands	European federalism	
VVD LGBT	VVD LHBT	People's Party for Freedom and Democracy	Conservative liberalism	

=== New Zealand ===
Name of organisation	Native name(s) of organisation	Political Party	Ideology	References
National with Pride		New Zealand National Party	Conservatism	
Rainbow Labour New Zealand	Reipa Āniwaniwa o Aotearoa	New Zealand Labour Party	Social democracy	
Rainbow Greens		Green Party of Aotearoa New Zealand	Green politics	

=== Sweden ===
Name of organisation	Native name(s) of organisation	Political Party	Ideology	References
Centre Party's LGBT Network	Centerpartiets HBT-nätverk	Centre Party	Nordic agrarianism	
Green LGBTQ Network	Grönt HBTQ-nätverk	Green Party	Green politics	
LGBT Liberals	HBT-liberaler	Liberals	Liberalism	
LGBTQ Leftists	HBTQ-vänstern	Left Party	Socialism	
LGBTQ+Social Democrats Sweden	HBTQ+Socialdemokrater Sverige	Swedish Social Democratic Party	Social democracy	
LGBT Socialists	HBT-socialisterna	Socialist Alternative	Trotskyism	
Open Christian Democrats	Öppna Kristdemokrater	Christian Democrats	Christian democracy	
Open Moderates	Öppna Moderater	Moderate Party	Liberal conservatism	

=== United Kingdom ===
Name of organisation	Political Party	Ideology	References	Notes
Alliance Party LGBT	Alliance Party of Northern Ireland	Liberalism, Cross-community		
LGBT+ Conservatives	Conservative Party	Conservatism		
LGBTIQA+ Greens	Green Party	Green politics		
LGBT+ Labour	Labour Party	Social democracy		
Labour for Trans Rights	Labour Party	Social democracy		
LGBT+ Liberal Democrats	Liberal Democrats	Liberalism		
Out for Indy	Scottish National Party	Scottish nationalism		
Plaid Pride	Plaid Cymru	Welsh nationalism		
Pride in Labour	Labour Party	Social democracy		Unofficial splinter organisation of LGBT+ Labour
Pride in the Union	Ulster Unionist Party	Ulster unionism, Conservativism		
SDLP LGBT+	Social Democratic and Labour Party	Irish nationalism		

=== United States ===
Name of organisation	Political Party	Ideology	References
Alice B. Toklas LGBT Democratic Club	Democratic Party	American liberalism	
GOProud	Republican Party	Republicanism	
Harvey Milk Lesbian, Gay, Bisexual, Transgender Democratic Club	Democratic Party	American liberalism	
Lavender Greens Caucus	Green Party	Green politics	
Log Cabin Republicans	Republican Party	Republicanism	
National Stonewall Democrats	Democratic Party	American liberalism	
Republican Unity Coalition	Republican Party	Republicanism	

== See also ==
- Women's wing
- Youth wing
- Student wing
