= LGBTQ conservatism =

Movement within conservatism among LGBTQ people

LGBTQ conservatism refers to LGBTQ (lesbian, gay, bisexual, transgender and queer) individuals with conservative political views.

== History ==
=== Before the Stonewall riots ===
==== France ====
In 1791, Louis-Michel Le Peletier de Saint-Fargeau presented a new criminal code to the National Constituent Assembly. The code did not list crimes associated with homosexuality, thereby removing criminal penalties for those acts.

In 1810, a new criminal code was issued under Napoleon which continued to exclude provisions criminalizing homosexuality.

==== Portugal ====
In 1852, under the government of the Duke of Saldanha, a Cartista, same-sex sexual intercourse was legalized throughout Portugal.

==== Germany ====
On 25 June 1969, shortly before the end of a Christian Democratic Union-Social Democratic Party coalition government led by Chancellor Kurt Georg Kiesinger, Paragraph 175, which criminalized male same-sex sexual intercourse, was amended. "Qualified" offenses—sexual acts with a male under 21, homosexual prostitution, and exploitation of a relationship of dependency—remained.

==== United Kingdom ====
On 24 February 1954, Prime Minister Winston Churchill stated during a Cabinet meeting that the Conservative Party would not support making laws more lenient toward homosexual men, though he suggested an inquiry and limited press reporting of such cases.

In 1957, following increasing prosecutions, the Conservative government commissioned the Committee on Homosexual Offences and Prostitution (Wolfenden Committee). Its report recommended decriminalizing consensual homosexual acts between adults in private and strengthening laws against public sexual conduct and street prostitution.

In May 1965, Arthur Gore, 8th Earl of Arran introduced a bill in the House of Lords to decriminalize male same-sex sexual intercourse in England and Wales. Amendments added a more restrictive standard of privacy than for heterosexual behavior, including prohibitions on acts involving more than two people or occurring in public lavatories. The bill later entered the House of Commons under closeted homosexual Conservative MP Humphrey Berkeley and, after Berkeley lost his seat in the 1966 United Kingdom general election, was taken up by Labour Party MP Leo Abse.

The Sexual Offences Act 1967 passed under a Labour government, partially decriminalizing consensual same-sex acts between adults in private in England and Wales. A minority of Conservative MPs voted in favor, including future Prime Minister Margaret Thatcher.

In 2007, Brian Coleman wrote that London police in the mid-1950s were allegedly aware of future Prime Minister Edward Heath's involvement in cottaging and warned him due to potential career impact. Coleman also asserted that gay men held significant positions within the London Conservative Party during that era.

Robert Boothby, a Conservative politician, was known within political circles to be homosexual.

==== Argentina ====
In 1887, during the period known as the Conservative Republic (Spanish: República Conservadora), same-sex sexual intercourse was legalized throughout Argentina.

=== After the Stonewall riots ===
==== United Kingdom ====
In 1975, the Conservative Group for Homosexual Equality (CGHE) was founded by Peter Walter Campbell.

In 1980, during the First Thatcher ministry, the Criminal Justice (Scotland) Act 1980 was enacted, legalizing same-sex sexual intercourse in Scotland.

In 1991, the CGHE reformed at the Conservative Party Conference as the Tory Campaign for Homosexual Equality (TORCHE) and remained active until its disbandment in 2004.

In 2007, Brian Coleman wrote in the New Statesman that many gay politicians in the Conservative Party became active during the Thatcher era.

On 5 October 2011, Prime Minister David Cameron stated at a Conservative Party conference that he supported same-sex marriage.

During the passage of the Marriage (Same-Sex Couples) Act 2013, voting among Conservative MPs was divided.

==== Ireland ====
On 24 June 2004, Fine Gael proposed legal recognition of civil partnerships for opposite-sex and same-sex couples, the first Irish political party to do so.

In November 2004, Taoiseach Bertie Ahern stated that equality for couples should be addressed while noting that legalizing same-sex marriage remained distant.

During the 2004 Irish presidential election, Fianna Fáil, Fine Gael, and the Progressive Democrats expressed support for forms of recognition for same-sex couples.

During the 2007 Irish general election, the manifestos of Fianna Fáil, Fine Gael, and the Progressive Democrats supported civil unions for same-sex couples, and all three parties advertised in Gay Community News.

In 2010, Ógra Fianna Fáil announced support for same-sex marriage. In July 2011, Young Fine Gael publicly supported same-sex marriage.

On 3 March 2012, Fianna Fáil endorsed same-sex marriage. On 5 November 2013, Fine Gael formally supported same-sex marriage.

On 22 May 2015, the Thirty-Fourth Amendment to the Constitution of Ireland (Marriage Equality) was approved by referendum. The referendum was held under a Fine Gael–Labour coalition government.

==== Iraq ====
On 21 April 2003, following the removal of the Ba'athist government, the Coalition Provisional Authority reinstated a revised 1988 penal code, resulting in the legalization of same-sex sexual intercourse.

==== Botswana ====
In 2010, the government led by the Botswana Democratic Party amended the Employment Act to prohibit dismissal on the basis of sexual orientation or HIV status.

==== Germany ====
In April 2023, the Christian Social Union in Bavaria endorsed same-sex marriage. In May 2024, the Christian Democratic Union of Germany expressed support for same-sex marriage.

== By country ==
=== Brazil ===
Clodovil Hernandes, a member of the Christian Labour Party and later the Party of the Republic, is regarded as the first openly gay member of Brazil’s Chamber of Deputies. He served until his death in 2009.

On January 16, 2017, Marcelo Crivella, mayor of Rio de Janeiro, appointed Nélio Georgini, an openly gay evangelical conservative, to lead the city’s LGBTQ council.

In the 2018 Brazilian presidential runoff, according to Datafolha, 30% of LGBTQ voters supported right-wing candidate Jair Bolsonaro. The significant share of LGBTQ support for Bolsonaro drew attention in Brazilian media due to his socially conservative, anti-LGBTQ positions.

=== Canada ===
LGBTory was established in 2015 as an organization for LGBTQ supporters of the Conservative Party of Canada and provincial conservative parties. Prior to its formation, smaller informal groups existed in some Canadian cities and online.

Several openly gay figures have been associated with conservative parties at the federal or provincial level, including Scott Brison and Lorne Mayencourt. Other politicians, such as Keith Norton, Phil Gillies, and Heward Grafftey, disclosed their sexual orientation after leaving office, while Richard Hatfield was publicly identified as gay posthumously. Many of these individuals have been associated with the Red Tory tradition, a moderate to progressive strand of Canadian conservatism. Brison left the Progressive Conservative Party to join the Liberal Party after the PCs merged with the Canadian Alliance to form the Conservative Party of Canada.

In 2015, LGBTory organized the first official participation by federal Conservative MPs and Ontario Progressive Conservative MPPs in Toronto's Pride parade. In 2016, interim Conservative leader Rona Ambrose became the first leader of the federal party to march in the Toronto Pride Parade, joined by other MPs.

In 2019, Ontario Premier Doug Ford, Deputy Premier Christine Elliott, and cabinet ministers Caroline Mulroney and Stephen Lecce marched in the York Region Pride Parade, marking the first time a sitting conservative Ontario premier participated in a Pride event. Eric Duncan became the first openly gay Conservative MP elected in 2019, and Melissa Lantsman became the first openly lesbian Conservative MP elected in 2021.

Éric Duhaime, leader of the Conservative Party of Quebec (PCQ) since 2020, is openly gay.During the 2026 Quebec general election, Duhaime won his seat in the Bellechasse riding, making him an MNA for the first time in his political career. It also marked the first time PCQ gained official party status since being founded in 2009.

=== Chile ===
In 2014, the doctrinal council of the conservative National Renewal voted 72.3% to reject a proposal that would have advocated limiting marriage and adoption to heterosexual couples.

=== European Union ===
Members of the European Parliament from across the political spectrum, including conservatives, have formed the European Parliament Intergroup on LGBT Rights.

=== Denmark ===
The previous leader of the Conservative People's Party in Denmark, Søren Pape Poulsen, was openly gay.

=== France ===
A 2013 IFOP survey found that the political preferences of LGBTQ people in France were broadly similar to those of the general population.

2013 IFOP survey on French LGBTQ people's political support by party
Affiliation	% of French LGBTQ people
Total	100
Right-wing parties	36
Gaullist parties	21
Union for a Popular Movement	14
Union of Democrats and Independents	6
Other	1
National Front	15
Left-wing parties	36
Socialist Party	27
Europe Ecology – The Greens	6
Other	3

=== Germany ===
In Germany the Christian Democratic Union of Germany (CDU) since 2020 and the Christian Social Union in Bavaria (CSU) in Bavaria since 2023 support Same-sex marriages. In 2020, the Christian Democratic Union (CDU) published a political video supporting same-sex marriage and families, and in 2023 the Christian Social Union in Bavaria (CSU) adopted a party platform supporting same-sex marriage. As of 2023, the right wing party Alternative for Germany (AfD) remains the largest party opposed to same-sex marriage and supports only civil partnerships. Conversely, the leader of the AfD Alice Weidel is an open lesbian and lives in a civil partnership with two children.

=== Netherlands ===
Much of the Dutch right wing (including figures such as Geert Wilders) has evolved to include LGBTQ rights platforms which do not conflict with the current status quo but also embrace an increased perturbation to supposed threats from minority religions (especially Islam) which, in their view, threaten to upend the vestiges of the liberalism and tolerance which has been associated with the Dutch social climate.

The former political party the Pim Fortuyn List supported LGBTQ rights, and its leader and namesake Pim Fortuyn was openly gay.

=== Sweden ===
The Open Moderates is the LGBT-organisation of the Moderate Party in Sweden. The Open Moderates is an organization for everyone that shares the values of the Moderate Party and who believe that LGBT-issues are important political issues to work with from a center-right perspective.

The origin of the Open Moderates is the Stockholm-based club "Gay Moderates" that was formed already in the late 1970s. That club had mostly social activities and it was active upon until the mid-1990s. A new generation took over and reorganized the Gay Moderates as a new more political network to lobby the Moderate Party. In 2003 the name was changed to the current Open Moderates to signal that the organization is open to everyone regardless of sexual orientation that want to work with LGBTQ political issues.

In recent years, the national conservative Sweden Democrats party has softened its stance on LGBTQ rights and same-sex parenting with party leader Jimmie Åkesson suggesting in 2018 that the party would rewrite its program for the first time to include LGBTQ related issues. One of the SD's legislators and spokesmen Bo Broman is homosexual.

The conservative Citizens' Coalition leader Ilan Sadé is openly gay.

=== United Kingdom ===
In April 2015, PinkNews found 26% of British LGBTQ people supported the Conservative and Unionist Party, a 5% increase from the last election in 2010, 26% support the Labour Party, a 2% decrease from the last election in 2010, 19% support the Liberal Democrats, a 21% decrease from the last election in 2010, 20% support the Green Party of England and Wales/Scottish Green Party/Green Party in Northern Ireland, a 16% increase from the last election in 2010, and 2% supported the UK Independence Party. This is the first time in the 10 years that PinkNews has polled the LGBTQ community that the Conservatives led the survey of voting intentions.

The first LGBTQ Conservative group was called CGHE (Conservative Group for Homosexual Equality). That group was reconstituted at the Conservative party Conference in 1991 and was renamed TORCHE (the Tory Campaign for Homosexual Equality). This group was active until 2003. Some years later, LGBTory was formed. LGBTory has an active membership often organized using its Facebook groups and pages and attends vigils and LGBTQ Pride events across the UK including Pride London, Pride Scotia, Leeds Pride, Manchester Pride, Doncaster Pride and Brighton Pride.

LGBTory campaigned in seats throughout the campaign for the May 6, 2010, general election. There are now at least 12 openly gay and lesbian Conservative MPs in Parliament.

LGBTory, now renamed to LGBT+ Conservatives, works to promote LGBTQ equality within the Conservative Party and generally across the UK, actively campaigning against the Gay Blood Ban and for marriage equality, regardless of sexuality or gender identity.

The UK Independence Party has an officially recognized LGBTQ in UKIP campaigning group which is active on the social media sites Twitter and Facebook. It has been represented at the party's annual conference. Peter Whittle of the UKIP was the only LGBTQ candidate in the 2016 London Assembly election; afterwards, he was selected as the UKIP's deputy leader.

== Notable LGBTQ conservatives ==
=== Lesbian ===
- Angie Bell
- Ana Brnabić
- Alice Weidel
- Tammy Bruce
- Jodeen Carney
- Mary Cheney
- Ruth Davidson
- Radclyffe Hall
- Melissa Lantsman
- Jacqui Munro
- Nancy Ruth
- Anne Marie Waters
- Alison Esposito
- Gertrude Stein
- Anne Lister
- Helen Dale
- Bari Weiss

=== Gay men ===
- Fernando Holiday
- Clodovil Hernandes
- Francis Bacon
- Guy Benson
- Scott Bessent
- Bruno Bilde
- Peter Boykin
- Steeve Briois
- Bo Broman
- David Bull
- Neil Brown
- Renaud Camus
- Sébastien Chenu
- Iain Dale
- Don Dobie
- Renaud Donnedieu de Vabres
- Jack Donovan
- Eric Duncan
- Éric Duhaime
- Trevor Evans
- Kenny Everett
- Pim Fortuyn
- Peter Gibson
- Gilbert & George
- Kay Gottschalk
- Richard Grenell
- Darren Grimes
- Gerald Grosz
- Mark Harbers
- Don Harwin
- Chris Janssens
- Roger Karoutchi
- Liberace
- Shayne Mallard
- Nico Marchetti
- José María Marco
- Javier Maroto
- Joe McCracken
- Ken Mehlman
- Deroy Murdock
- Douglas Murray
- Andy Ngo
- Amir Ohana
- Andrew Olexander
- Matthew Parris
- Florian Philippot
- Søren Pape Poulsen
- Chris Rath
- Jeremy Roberts
- Lee Rowley
- Dave Rubin
- George Santos
- Dean Smith
- Jens Spahn
- Norman St John-Stevas
- Brandon Straka
- David Starkey
- Andrew Sullivan
- Jean-Philippe Tanguy
- Philipp Tanzer
- Peter Thiel
- Tomas Tobé
- Leo Varadkar
- Hans-Ueli Vogt
- Peter Whittle
- Tim Wilson
- Joop Wijn
- Lucian Wintrich
- Dan Wootton
- William Wragg
- Michael Yabsley
- Milo Yiannopoulos (Note: Yiannopoulos claims to no longer be gay.)
- Rokas Žilinskas
- Trent Zimmerman

=== Bisexual ===
- Tobias Billström
- Cherie Currie
- Dehenna Davison
- Michael Fabricant
- Jeromy Farkas
- Michael Huffington
- Daniel Kawczynski
- Jack Kerouac
- Thomas Mann
- Yukio Mishima
- Amber Rose
- Sebastian Tynkkynen
- Evelyn Waugh

=== Transgender ===
- Caitlyn Jenner
- Miles Shore (Note: Shore claims to have detransitioned.)
- Nikki Sinclaire
- Blaire White
- Katie Wallis
- Jessica Marie Watkins
- Buck Angel
- Jennell Jaquays
- Bubba Copeland

== List of organizations ==
Some organizations include:

- Gay Voter's League (not active since 1981) – linked to the Republican Party (United States)
- Gays for Trump – linked to the Republican Party (United States)
- GOProud (dissolved in 2014) – linked to the Republican Party (United States)
- Liberal Pride – linked to Liberal Party of Australia (Australia)
- Likud Pride – linked to Likud (Israel)
- LGBTory – linked to the Conservative Party of Canada/Progressive Conservative Party of Ontario (Canada)
- LGBT+ Conservatives (formerly known as LGBTory) – linked to the Conservative Party (United Kingdom)
- Log Cabin Republicans – linked to the Republican Party (United States)
- Open Moderates (originally called Gay Moderates) – linked to the Moderate Party (Sweden)
- Republican Unity Coalition (not active since 2003) – linked to the Republican Party (United States)
- Tory Campaign for Homosexual Equality (originally called the Conservative Group for Homosexual Equality) – linked to the Conservative Party (United Kingdom)

=== Historical ===
- GayLib – before 2018, linked to the conservative Union for a Popular Movement and the centre-right liberal Union of Democrats and Independents, but since 2018 it has been associated with the social-liberal Radical Party (France).

== See also ==
- LGBTQ movements
- Progressive conservatism
- Log Cabin Republicans
- Gays Against Groomers
