= Paul Holmes (Conservative politician) =

British politician (born 1988)

Paul Holmes MP
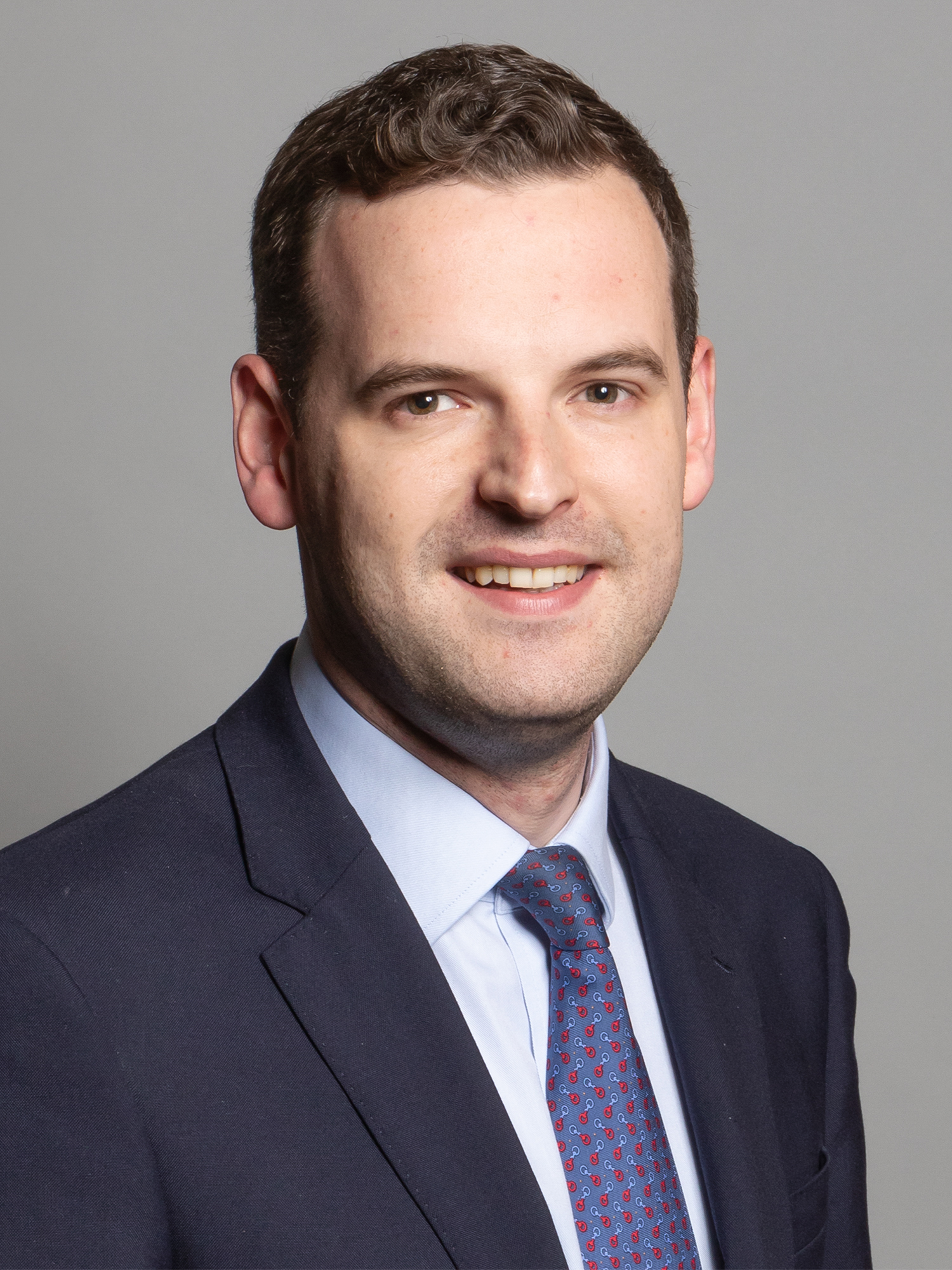
- Official portrait, 2020

Assistant Government Whip
- In office 25 April 2024 – 5 July 2024
- Prime Minister: Rishi Sunak

Member of Parliament for Hamble Valley
- Incumbent
- Assumed office 4 July 2024
- Preceded by: Constituency established
- Majority: 4,802 (8.9%)

Member of Parliament for Eastleigh
- In office 12 December 2019 – 30 May 2024
- Preceded by: Mims Davies
- Succeeded by: Liz Jarvis

Personal details
- Born: Paul John Holmes; 25 August 1988 (age 38) Southwark, London, England
- Party: Conservative
- Education: Kelsey Park Sports College
- Alma mater: University of Southampton (BSc)
- Website: www.paulholmesmp.co.uk

Paul John Holmes (born 25 August 1988) is a British Conservative Party politician who has been the Member of Parliament (MP) for Hamble Valley since 2024. He was the Member of Parliament for Eastleigh from 2019 to 2024. Holmes served as Shadow Minister for Housing, Communities and Local Government having been appointed by Kemi Badenoch in 2024. In the opposition reshuffle of September 2026, Holmes was appointed Deputy Chief Whip of HM Official Opposition.

== Early life and education ==
Paul Holmes was born on 25 August 1988 at Guy's Hospital in Southwark, to John Edward Holmes and Sandra Holmes. He grew up on the Bellingham council estate in Lewisham.

Holmes attended Elfrida Primary School in Bellingham and Kelsey Park Sports College in Beckenham. He then went on to study Politics and International Relations at the University of Southampton.

== Political career ==
While a second-year student at the University of Southampton, Holmes was elected as a Conservative councillor in the 2008 Southampton City Council election, representing the Redbridge ward. He served on Southampton City Council as Chair of the Planning Committee and Cabinet Member for Education and Social Services. Holmes stood down at the 2012 council election.

Holmes worked as a parliamentary researcher to Wimbledon MP Stephen Hammond from 2011 to 2015. From 2015 to 2016, he was an account manager at Portland Communications.

He worked as a special adviser (SpAd) to Chairman of the Conservative Party and Chancellor of the Duchy of Lancaster Patrick McLoughlin between 2016 and 2017, before becoming Special Adviser to Damian Green, the first secretary of state and minister for the Cabinet Office. Holmes remained in this role until Green's resignation from Government. He then worked as SpAd to the secretary of state for education, Damian Hinds, in 2018, and became head of public affairs at Clarion Housing Group in the same year.

== Parliamentary career ==
Holmes stood in Mitcham and Morden at the 2015 general election, coming second with 23.2% of the vote behind the incumbent Labour MP Siobhain McDonagh.

At the snap 2017 general election, Holmes stood in Southampton Test, coming second with 34.1% of the vote behind the incumbent Labour MP Alan Whitehead.

At the 2019 general election, Holmes was elected to Parliament as MP for Eastleigh with 55.4% of the vote and a majority of 15,607.

He was elected to serve on the Housing, Communities and Local Government Select Committee until January 2021, and the Select Committee on Statutory Instruments, on which he continues to serve.

In January 2021, he was appointed as Parliamentary Private Secretary to the Home Office ministerial team. On 20 September 2021, Holmes was promoted to PPS to the home secretary Priti Patel. He resigned from this position on 27 May 2022, over concerns around "toxic culture" at the heart of Government following the publication of the Sue Gray report.

Holmes was appointed Vice Chairman of the Conservative Party with responsibility for policy in November 2022 following Rishi Sunak forming a Government, he left this position in September 2023 when Holmes was appointed as Parliamentary Private Secretary to Michael Gove, the Secretary of State for Levelling Up, Housing and Communities. In November 2023 he was appointed as Parliamentary Private Secretary to the Foreign Secretary, David Cameron.

Following the suspension in February 2024 of former party deputy chair Lee Anderson for making Islamophobic remarks about the Mayor of London Sadiq Khan, who is a Muslim, Holmes defended Anderson. Holmes was quoted as saying his suspension "will drive the agenda that we can’t speak up on things. Especially after last Wednesday and the protests we saw," referring to protests regarding the Gaza war outside Parliament.

In April 2024, Holmes was appointed as an Assistant Government Whip.

At the 2024 general election, Holmes stood in Hamble Valley, and was elected to Parliament as MP for Hamble Valley with 36.4% of the vote and a majority of 4,802.

Holmes resigned as an opposition whip in October 2024 in order to publicly support James Cleverly in the 2024 Conservative Party leadership election.

Holmes is a patron of LGBT+ Conservatives.

== Personal life ==
Holmes currently lives in Hedge End. He lists his recreations as "real ale, cooking, aviation", and is a member of the Southern Parishes Conservative club.

In 2024, PinkNews listed Holmes among a number of out LGBTQ+ parliamentarians.

== Electoral history ==
General election 2024: Hamble Valley
Party	Candidate	Votes	%	±%
Conservative	Paul Holmes	19,671	36.4	−25.8
Liberal Democrats	Prad Bains	14,869	27.5	+6.4
Labour	Devina Paul	8,753	16.2	+2.6
Reform	Caroline Gladwin	8,216	15.2	N/A
Green	Kate Needham	2,310	4.3	+1.2
Hampshire Ind.	Binka Griffin	185	0.3	N/A
Majority		4,802	8.9	−32.3
Turnout		54,004	67.1	−7.1
Registered electors		80,537		
Conservative hold		Swing	−16.1	

Parliament of the United Kingdom
Preceded by Mims Davies	Member of Parliament for Eastleigh; 2019–2024	Succeeded by Liz Jarvis
Preceded by New seat	Member of Parliament for Hamble Valley; 2024–present	Incumbent
