= 2014 Southampton City Council election =

2014 UK local government election

← 2012	22 May 2014	2015 →

A third of seats to Southampton City Council 23 seats needed for a majority
	First party	Second party	Third party
Party	Labour	Conservative	Independent
Seats won	8	8	1
Seats after	28	18	2
Seat change	▲1	▲1	▲1
Popular vote	20,626	18,703	2,096
Percentage	34.3%	31.1%	3.5%
Swing	▲1.3%	▼3.1%	▲3.1%
- Map showing the election results. Each ward represents 1 seat
Majority party before election
Labour
Majority party after election
Labour

The 2014 Southampton City Council election took place on Thursday 22 May 2014 to elect members of Southampton City Council in Hampshire, England. One third of the council (16 seats) was up for election, and an additional vacancy in Millbrook ward caused by the resignation of a sitting councillor who had been elected in 2012 was also filled, meaning a total of 17 of the city's 48 seats were elected. The elections took place on the same day as the elections to the European Parliament.

Southampton Council is elected in thirds, which means the all comparisons are to the corresponding 2010 Southampton City Council election. In Millbrook, the candidate with the most votes was elected for a full term lasting until 2018. The candidate who came second was elected for the remainder of the resigned councillor's term, ending in 2016.

Coxford councillors who formed the Putting People First group originally split from Labour in 2013. Keith Morrell was up for election in the ward in this election.

== Election result ==
Southampton local election result 2014
Party	Seats	Gains	Losses	Net gain/loss	Seats %	Votes %	Votes	+/−
Labour	8	2	1	▲1	47.1	34.3	20,626	▲1.3
Conservative	8	2	1	▲1	47.1	31.1	18,703	▼3.1
Independent	1	1	0	▲1	5.8	3.5	2,096	▲3.1
UKIP	0	0	0	Steady	0.0	15.1	9,077	▲14.0
Liberal Democrats	0	0	2	▼2	0.0	8.0	4,799	▼10.8
Green	0	0	0	Steady	0.0	5.4	3,279	▲2.6
TUSC	0	0	0	Steady	0.0	2.8	1,675	New

=== Changes in council composition ===
Party	Previous council	New council	+/-
Labour	27	28	▲1
Conservatives	17	18	▲1
Councillors Against Cuts	2	2	▲2
Liberal Democrat	2	0	▼2
Total	48	48	
Working majority	6	8	

== Ward results ==
=== Bargate ===
Bargate
Party	Candidate	Votes	%	±%
Labour	Sarah Bogle	1317	43.8	−4.9
Conservative	Spencer Bowman	809	26.9	−6.1
UKIP	David Nightingale	430	14.2	+14.2
Green	Joe Cox	399	13.3	+7.1
TUSC	David Rawlinson	53	1.8	−1.8
Majority		508	16.9	+1.2
Turnout		3023	21.21	
Labour hold		Swing	+0.6	

=== Bassett ===
Bassett
Party	Candidate	Votes	%	±%
Conservative	Beryl Harris	1610	44.4	−5.1
Labour	Andrew Godsell	988	27.2	−0.2
UKIP	Alan Keeble	574	15.8	+15.8
Liberal Democrats	David Whalley	410	11.3	+0.2
TUSC	Neil Kelly	47	1.3	−0.6
Majority		622	17.1	−5.4
Turnout		3629	32.2	+1.9
Conservative hold		Swing		

=== Bevois ===
Bevois
Party	Candidate	Votes	%
Labour	Derek Burke	1,834	60.2
Conservative	Khalid Mahmood	446	14.6
Green	Ron Meldrum	400	13.1
Liberal Democrats	Adrian Ford	236	8.1
TUSC	Andrew Howe	96	3.2
Majority		1,388	45.6
Turnout		3,046	45.6
Labour hold			

=== Bitterne ===
Bitterne
Party	Candidate	Votes	%
Labour	Simon Letts	1,153	35.0
UKIP	Thomas Collier	966	29.4
Conservative	David Fuller	963	29.3
Liberal Democrats	Robert Naish	140	4.3
TUSC	Declan Clune	55	1.7
Majority		187	5.6
Turnout		3,291	
Labour hold			

=== Bitterne Park ===
Bitterne Park
Party	Candidate	Votes	%
Conservative	John Inglis	1,191	31.4
Labour	Trevor Cooper	980	25.9
UKIP	Adrian Cook	810	21.4
Green	Lindsi Bluemel	346	9.1
Liberal Democrats	James Read	296	7.8
Independent	Ann MacGillivray	110	2.9
TUSC	Linda Boulton	42	1.1
Majority		211	5.5
Turnout		3,791	
Conservative hold			

=== Coxford ===
Coxford
Party	Candidate	Votes	%
Independent	Keith Morrell	1,633	42.5
UKIP	Colin Hingston	796	20.7
Labour	Brian Norgate	724	18.8
Conservative	Trevor Glasspool	500	13.0
Liberal Democrats	Peter Galton	168	4.4
Majority		837	21.8
Turnout		3,843	
Independent gain from Labour			

=== Freemantle ===
Freemantle
Party	Candidate	Votes	%
Conservative	Jeremy Moulton	1,472	38.5
Labour	Pat Usher	1,166	30.5
UKIP	Dean Bartram	471	12.3
Green	Christopher Bluemel	449	11.8
Liberal Democrats	Harry Mitchell	214	5.6
TUSC	Mike Marx	36	0.9
Majority		306	8.0
Turnout		3,820	
Conservative hold			

=== Harefield ===
Harefield
Party	Candidate	Votes	%
Conservative	Royston Smith	1,915	49.0
UKIP	Vincent Avellino	852	21.8
Labour	Mohamed Mohamud	850	21.7
Liberal Democrats	John Dennis	204	3.6
TUSC	Graham O’Reilly	70	1.5
Majority		1,063	27.2
Turnout		3,912	
Conservative hold			

=== Millbrook ===
Millbrook (2)
Party	Candidate	Votes	%
Labour	'Mike Denness'	'1,404'	
Conservative	Steven Galton	1,305	
Labour	David Furnell	1,291	
Conservative	Val Laurent	1,044	
UKIP	Pearline Hingston	916	
Green	Daniel Payne	416	
Liberal Democrats	Paul Clarke	258	
Independent	Stephen Plumridge	216	
Independent	Richard McQuillan	137	
TUSC	Tara Bosworth	61	
TUSC	Josh Asker	47	
Turnout		3,890	
Labour hold			
Conservative gain from Labour			

=== Peartree ===
Peartree
Party	Candidate	Votes	%
Labour	Paul Lewzey	1,474	40.9
Conservative	Matthew Turpin	1,267	35.2
Liberal Democrats	Eileen Bowers	493	13.7
TUSC	Phil Snider	305	8.5
Majority		207	5.7
Turnout		3,603	207
Labour gain from Liberal Democrats			

=== Portswood ===
Portswood
Party	Candidate	Votes	%
Conservative	Paul O'Neill	1,147	30.3
Liberal Democrats	Adrian Vinson	1,096	29.0
Labour	Lucas Szlek	910	24.1
Green	Cara Sandys	508	13.4
TUSC	Nick Chaffey	98	2.6
Majority		51	1.3
Turnout		3,780	
Conservative gain from Liberal Democrats			

=== Redbridge ===
Redbridge
Party	Candidate	Votes	%
Labour	Cathie McEwing	1,614	51.0
Conservative	Charles Daniel-Hobbs	804	25.4
TUSC	Kieran Wilson	435	13.8
Liberal Democrats	Simon Stokes	250	7.9
Majority		810	25.6
Turnout		3,163	
Labour hold			

=== Shirley ===
Shirley
Party	Candidate	Votes	%
Labour	Hannah Coombs	1,776	40.9
Conservative	Chris Grace	1,245	28.7
UKIP	Nick Ray	742	17.1
Green	John Spottiswoode	328	7.6
Liberal Democrats	Steven Hulbert	197	4.5
TUSC	Gary Laxton	32	0.7
Majority		531	12.2
Turnout		4,342	
Labour gain from Conservative			

=== Sholing ===
Sholing
Party	Candidate	Votes	%
Conservative	Nigel Hecks	1,188	31.5
Labour	Phil Wood	1,179	31.3
UKIP	John Sharp	1,147	30.4
Liberal Democrats	James Cappleman	178	4.7
TUSC	Darren Galpin	51	1.4
Majority		9	0.2
Turnout		3,772	
Conservative hold			

=== Swaythling ===
Swaythling
Party	Candidate	Votes	%
Conservative	Bob Painton	903	32.4
Labour	Frances Murphy	825	29.6
Liberal Democrats	Maureen Turner	437	15.7
Green	Angela Cotton	433	15.6
TUSC	Kevin Hayes	129	4.6
Majority		78	2.8
Turnout		2,783	
Conservative gain from Liberal Democrats			

=== Woolston ===
Woolston
Party	Candidate	Votes	%
Labour	Caran Chamberlain	1,141	34.3
UKIP	Derek Humber	936	28.1
Conservative	Alex Houghton	894	26.9
Liberal Democrats	Colin Bleach	212	6.4
TUSC	Sue Atkins	118	3.5
Majority		205	6.2
Turnout		3,328	
Labour hold			

Preceded by 2012 Southampton City Council election	Southampton City Council elections	Succeeded by 2015 Southampton City Council election
