= Tory Campaign for Homosexual Equality =

Conservative party pro LGBT pressure group

- Predecessor: None
- Successor: LGBT+ Conservatives
- Formation: 1975
- Founder: Peter Walter Campbell
- Founded at: United Kingdom
- Dissolved: 2004
- Purpose: LGBT conservatism
- Location: United Kingdom
- Affiliations: Conservative Party

The Tory Campaign for Homosexual Equality (TORCHE) was a British LGBT conservative organization.

In 1975, it was founded as the Conservative Group for Homosexual Equality (CGHE), also called GayCon, by Peter Walter Campbell. The CGHE was a voluntary organization that lobbied the Conservative Party opinion in favour of gay rights and to provide a political balance within the gay rights movement. The group was revived in 1980; further, a constitution drawn up and adopted on 28 March 1981, establishing an elected Executive Committee to oversee the running of the group. In 1991, the CGHE reconstituted at the Conservative Party Conference and renamed the Tory Campaign for Homosexual Equality. The organization would remain active until 2004, when it disbanded.

== See also ==
- Campaign for Homosexual Equality
- List of organisations associated with the British Conservative Party
- List of LGBT-related organisations
- LGBT rights in the United Kingdom
