= Youth wing =

Allied front of a larger organization formed to gain potential members of a younger age

A youth wing is a subsidiary, autonomous, or independently allied front of a larger organization (usually a political party but occasionally another type of organization) that is formed in order to rally support for that organization from members and potential members of a younger age, as well as to focus on subjects and issues more widely relevant among that organization's youth. Youth wings may also be discussion forums for younger members and supporters of the organization to debate policy and ideology.

== Political parties ==
The term "youth wing" is most often used to refer to the youth wings of political parties; in such youth wings, ranking or leading members are often seen, upon attainance of the minimum age requirement, as potential leaders or bureaucrats of the main political party. This has led to a perception of political party youth wings as being mere gateways of employment opportunity in the government bureaucracy for younger members, especially in the case of dominant- or one-party systems where a party is ensured of victory at the polls.

Political party youth wings mostly consist of young adults. The age requirement for most political party youth wings ranges between a minimum age of 15 years old to an upper age limit of 30 years old (although there are youth wings of political parties that have an upper age limit as high as 35).

== Distinctions ==
=== From student wings ===
Youth wings are distinct from student wings, as the former is not necessarily established on, nor solely focused upon, a student-exclusive basis.

=== From political factions ===
Youth wings are not normally considered as factions of a political party, as youth wings are usually intended as youth focused extensions of party policy and ideology rather than being differently ideologised from the leadership of the party proper. However, sometimes they may advocate for different issues within the scope of the party ideology than the party as a whole.

== See also ==
- Youth politics
- List of youth organizations
- Student wing
- Women's wing
- LGBT wing
