= 2012 Southampton City Council election =

2012 UK local government election

← 2011	3 May 2012	2014 →

A third of seats to Southampton City Council 23 seats needed for a majority
	First party	Second party	Third party
Party	Labour	Conservative	Liberal Democrats
Seats won	30	16	2
Seat change	▲11	▼10	▼1
Popular vote	25,311	20,785	5,660
Percentage	43.7%	35.9%	9.8%
Swing	▲17.4%	▼11.5%	▼8.8%
- Map showing the election results. Each ward represents 1 seat
Majority party before election
Conservative
Majority party after election
Labour

The 2012 Southampton Council election took place on Thursday 3 May 2012 to elect members of Southampton City Council in Hampshire, England. One third of the council (16 seats) was scheduled for election, whilst two additional vacancies, caused by the resignation of sitting councillors, were also filled in Bitterne Park and Peartree wards, meaning a total of 18 of the city's 48 seats were elected.

The ruling Conservative party had come under intense public scrutiny for their sweeping programme of privatisation of council services and implementing pay cuts to council jobs, which led to union disputes. Labour won a majority of the seats being contested, and also gained overall control of the council from the Conservatives.

== Election result ==
This summary box compares each party vote share with the corresponding elections in 2008, the last elections at which the majority of this tranche of seats were elected.

Southampton local election result 2012
Party	Seats	Gains	Losses	Net gain/loss	Seats %	Votes %	Votes	+/−
Labour	13	11	0	▲11	72.2	43.7	25,311	▲17.4
Conservative	5	0	10	▼10	27.7	35.9	20,785	▼11.5
Liberal Democrats	0	0	1	▼1	0.0	9.8	5,660	▼8.8
Green	0	0	0	Steady	0.0	3.9	2,277	▼0.6
UKIP	0	0	0	Steady	0.0	2.4	1,390	▲1.4
TUSC	0	0	0	Steady	0.0	2.1	1,227	▲2.1
Independent	0	0	0	Steady	0.0	1.4	790	▼0.1
Southampton First	0	0	0	Steady	0.0	0.7	416	▲0.2

=== Changes in council composition ===
After the election, the composition of the council was:

Party	Previous council	New council	+/-
Labour	19	30	▲11
Conservatives	26	16	▼10
Liberal Democrat	3	2	▼1
Total	48	48	
Working majority	3	12	

== Ward results ==
Bargate
Party	Candidate	Votes	%	±%
Labour	Matt Tucker	1,100	48.7	+13.4
Conservative	Amy Willacy	745	33.0	−8.5
Green	Joe Cox	140	6.2	−0.9
Liberal Democrats	Derrick Murray	127	5.6	−5.8
TUSC	Sharon Cutler	82	3.6	+3.6
Independent	Matt Rose	67	3.0	−1.7
Majority		355	15.7	
Turnout		2,261	16.3	+0.2
Labour gain from Conservative		Swing	+11.0	

Bassett
Party	Candidate	Votes	%	±%
Conservative	John Hannides	1,641	49.5	−5.5
Labour	Ian Atkins	895	27.0	+17.9
Liberal Democrats	Steven Hulbert	367	11.1	−20.5
Green	Jonathan Bean	260	7.8	+7.8
Southampton First	James Knight	93	2.8	+2.8
TUSC	Neil Kelly	62	1.9	+1.9
Majority		746	22.5	−0.9
Turnout		3,318	30.3	−3.7
Conservative hold		Swing	-11.7	

Bevois
Party	Candidate	Votes	%	±%
Labour	Stephen Barnes-Andrews	1,473	57.6	+14.3
Conservative	Zahir Ahmed	642	25.1	−8.7
Green	Shaw Green	201	7.9	−4.2
Liberal Democrats	Adrian Ford	149	5.8	−5.1
TUSC	Andrew Howe	63	2.5	+2.5
Southampton First	Max McNamara	31	1.2	+1.2
Majority		831	32.5	+23.0
Turnout		2,559	22.2	+1.4
Labour hold		Swing	+11.5	

Bitterne
Party	Candidate	Votes	%	±%
Labour	Mary Lloyd	1,416	46.4	+10.9
Conservative	David Fuller	1,217	39.9	−10.4
UKIP	William Withers	210	6.9	+6.9
Liberal Democrats	Rob Naish	133	4.4	−8.9
TUSC	Perry McMillan	77	2.5	+2.5
Majority		199	6.5	
Turnout		3,053	30.3	+0.9
Labour gain from Conservative		Swing	+10.7	

Bitterne Park (2)
Party	Candidate	Votes	%	±%
Conservative	Ivan White	1,216		
Conservative	John Inglis	1,203		
Labour	Frances Murphy	1,135		
Labour	Mike Holder	979		
Liberal Democrats	Robbie Robinson	334		
Independent	Ann MacGillivray	333		
Liberal Democrats	James Read	331		
Green	Cara Sandys	292		
Independent	Charles Caplen	242		
TUSC	Nick Chaffey	136		
Turnout		3,266	30.8	+1.4
Conservative hold		Swing		
Conservative hold		Swing		

Coxford
Party	Candidate	Votes	%	±%
Labour	Sally Spicer	1,647	52.9	+22.2
Conservative	Trevor Glasspool	667	21.4	−10.3
Liberal Democrats	Peter Galton	334	10.7	−17.9
UKIP	Leslie Obee	295	9.5	+0.6
Green	Ronald Meldrum	75	2.4	+2.4
TUSC	Tim Cutter	57	1.8	+1.8
Independent	Ricky Lambert	39	1.3	+1.3
Majority		980	31.5	
Turnout		3,114	30.0	−1.3
Labour gain from Conservative		Swing	+16.3	

Freemantle
Party	Candidate	Votes	%	±%
Labour	Dave Shields	1,403	41.7	+18.9
Conservative	Michael Ball	1,330	39.5	−14.1
Green	Paul Garratt	288	7.9	−2.0
Liberal Democrats	Paul Abbott	233	6.4	−7.3
Independent	Steve Mullane	109	3.0	+3.0
Majority		73	2.2	
Turnout		3,363	30.6	+3.1
Labour gain from Conservative		Swing	+16.5	

Harefield
Party	Candidate	Votes	%	±%
Conservative	Edward Daunt	1,631	44.2	
Labour	Brian Norgate	1,489	40.4	
UKIP	Christine Hotson	305	8.3	
Liberal Democrats	Diane Robinson	190	5.1	
TUSC	Graham O’Reilly	75	2.0	
Majority		142	3.8	
Turnout		3,690	35.1	+0.8
Conservative hold		Swing		

Millbrook
Party	Candidate	Votes	%	±%
Labour	Georgina Laming	1,769	48.8	+27.6
Conservative	Steven Galton	1,603	44.2	−3.7
Liberal Democrats	Kenneth Darke	251	6.9	−15.1
Majority		166	4.6	
Turnout		3,623	33.0	+3.7
Labour gain from Conservative		Swing	+15.7	

Peartree (2)
Party	Candidate	Votes	%	±%
Labour	Eamonn Keogh	1,683		
Labour	Paul Lewzey	1,594		
Conservative	Matthew Jones	1,262		
Conservative	Christopher Grace	1,250		
Liberal Democrats	Eileen Bowers	497		
Liberal Democrats	Sebastian Buckle	384		
Green	Julie Williams	287		
Southampton First	Philip McShee	168		
TUSC	Josh Asker	139		
Turnout		3,751	35.8	+1.8
Labour gain from Conservative		Swing		
Labour gain from Liberal Democrats		Swing		

Portswood
Party	Candidate	Votes	%	±%
Conservative	Linda Norris	1,061	31.8	−5.8
Liberal Democrats	Keith Reed	1,015	30.5	−3.3
Labour	Olivia Vaughan	891	26.7	+12.7
Green	Christopher Bluemel	278	8.3	−2.0
TUSC	David Rawlinson	50	1.5	+1.5
Southampton First	Joseph Malone	38	1.1	−3.1
Majority		46	1.3	−2.5
Turnout		3,333	31.6	−0.1
Conservative hold		Swing	-1.3	

Redbridge
Party	Candidate	Votes	%	±%
Labour	Lee Whitbread	1,775	61.6	+19.9
Conservative	Spandita Woodman	703	24.4	−19.1
TUSC	Pete Wyatt	220	7.6	+7.6
Liberal Democrats	Simon Stokes	182	6.3	−8.5
Majority		1,072	37.2	
Turnout		2,880	27.8	+0.1
Labour gain from Conservative		Swing	+19.5	

Shirley
Party	Candidate	Votes	%	±%
Labour	Mark Chaloner	1,825	45.3	+13.8
Conservative	Terry Matthews	1,474	36.6	−15.0
Green	Dudley Clark	256	6.4	−2.6
UKIP	David Nightingale	235	5.8	+5.8
Liberal Democrats	Harry Mitchell	184	4.6	−4.3
TUSC	Mike King	52	1.3	+1.3
Majority		351	8.7	
Turnout		4,026	38.6	+2.5
Labour gain from Conservative		Swing	+14.4	

Sholing
Party	Candidate	Votes	%	±%
Labour	Dan Jeffery	1,805	47.0	+11.1
Conservative	Casey Baldwin	1,463	38.1	−16.0
UKIP	Helena Ridd	345	9.0	+9.0
Liberal Democrats	John Dennis	229	6.0	−4.0
Majority		342	8.9	
Turnout		3,842	35.7	+0.4
Labour gain from Conservative		Swing	+13.6	

Swaythling
Party	Candidate	Votes	%	±%
Labour	Sharon Mintoff	825	34.2	+22.1
Conservative	Edward Osmond	746	31.0	−10.6
Liberal Democrats	Jim Cappleman	477	19.8	−12.9
Green	Angela Cotton	200	8.3	+3.8
Southampton First	Anthony Lewis	86	3.6	−1.8
TUSC	Kev Hayes	76	3.2	+3.2
Majority		79	3.2	
Turnout		2,410	24.9	−4.0
Labour gain from Conservative		Swing		

Woolston
Party	Candidate	Votes	%	±%
Labour	Richard Williams	1,607	55.1	+13.7
Conservative	Alexander Houghton	931	31.9	−5.9
Liberal Democrats	Colin Bleach	243	8.3	−4.0
TUSC	Gavin Marsh	138	4.7	+4.7
Majority		676	23.2	+19.7
Turnout		2,919	29.4	−1.1
Labour hold		Swing	+9.8	

Preceded by 2011 Southampton Council election	Southampton local elections	Succeeded by 2014 Southampton Council election
