= Likud Pride =

LGBT organization in the Likud party of Israel

- Formation: 2011
- Type: LGBT conservatism Zionism
- Headquarters: Tel Aviv
- Region served: Israel
- Chairman: Amir Ohana
- Affiliations: Likud
- Website: likudpride.org.il

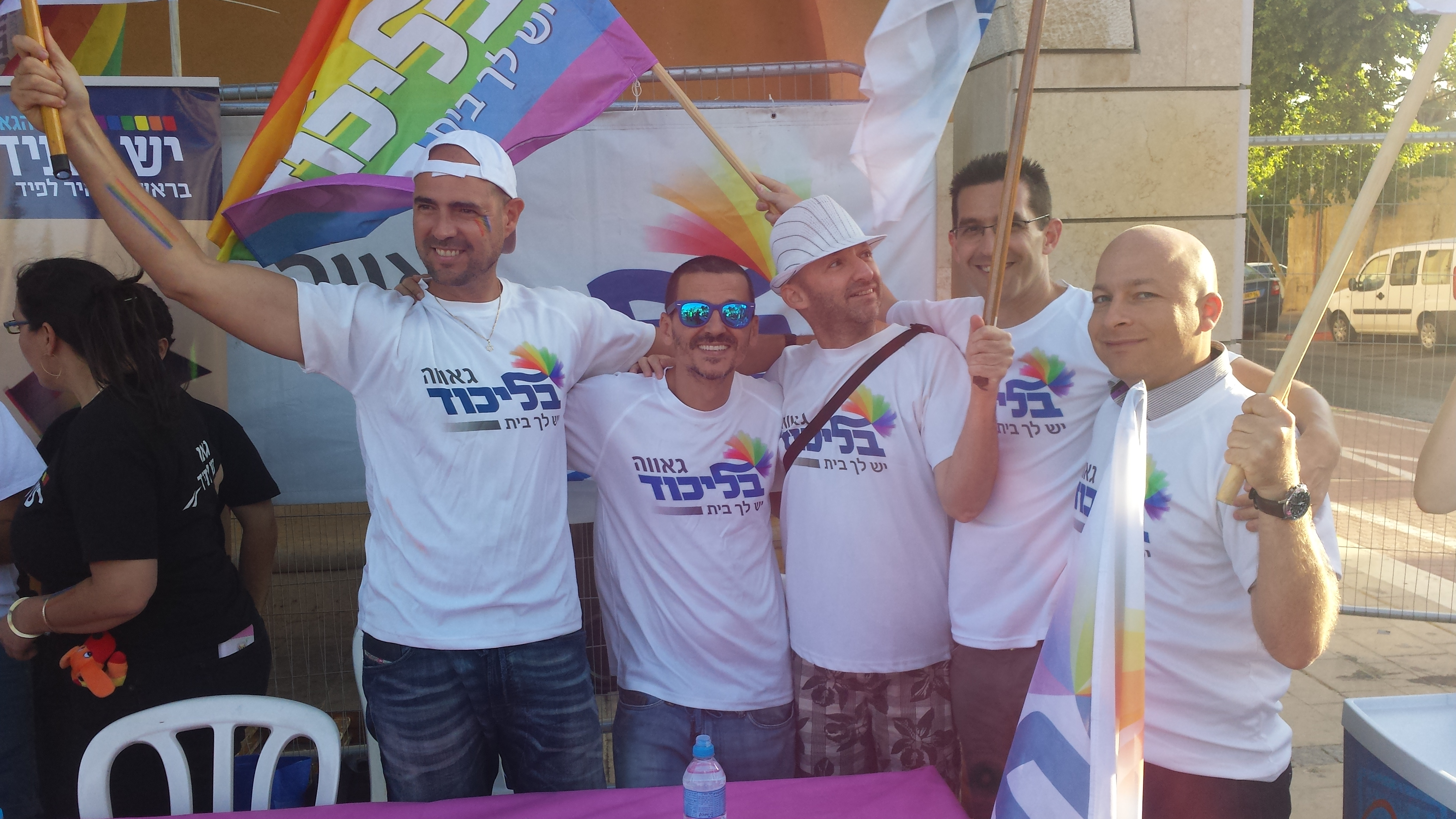
Likud Pride at a pride event in Be'er Sheva, 2015

Likud Pride (Hebrew: גאווה בליכוד, romanized: Ga'ava BaLikud) is a conservative LGBT organization founded in 2011 and linked to the Israeli right-wing Likud party. The group's chairman, who is also one of its founders, is Amir Ohana; he was designated in 2015 as the Likud's first openly gay member of the Knesset, and also of the Israeli right-wing.

They see themselves as a group with a Zionist and national liberal ideology, that integrates the values of the political party to which they belong.

The group contributes actively to participate in different public manifestations in favor of the rights of the LGBT people in Israel, such as pride parades and festivals, as well as the LGBT Day in the Knesset.
