= 2011 Southampton City Council election =

2011 UK local government election

← 2010	6 May 2011	2012 →
	First party	Second party	Third party
Party	Conservative	Labour	Liberal Democrats
Seats won	26	19	3
Seat change	▼2	▲4	▼2
Popular vote	23,677	25,935	8,659
Percentage	37.7%	41.3%	13.8%
- Map showing the election results

The 2011 Southampton Council election took place on 6 May 2011 to elect members of Southampton Unitary Council in Hampshire, England. One third of the council (16 seats) was up for election. Labour won a majority of the seats being contested and the Conservatives stayed in overall control of the council.

Southampton Council is elected in thirds, which means the vote share change is compared to the corresponding 2007 Southampton Council election.

== Election result ==
Of the 16 Council seats up for election, Labour won 10 (up from 7 in 2010) the Conservatives won 6 (no change from 2010) and the Liberal Democrats won 0 (down from 3 in 2010).

The seats that changed hands were as follows:

- Shirley (Lab gain from Con)
- Millbrook (Lab gain from Con)
- Sholing (Lab gain from Con)
- Peartree (Lab gain from Lib Dems)
- Portswood (Con gain from Lib Dems)

Overall turnout in the election was 37.0%, boosted by the AV referendum.

The night saw the Liberal Democrats lose both of their seats up for election, and their voter share reduced to under 14%. Conversely, the Conservatives saw their share of the vote improve slightly upon the previous year's, and a resurgent Labour gained their highest share of vote since 1999.

This summary box compares each party vote share with the corresponding elections in 2007.

Southampton local election result 2011
Party	Seats	Gains	Losses	Net gain/loss	Seats %	Votes %	Votes	+/−
Labour	10	4	0	▲4	62.5	41.3	25,935	▲10.5
Conservative	6	1	3	▼2	37.5	37.7	23,677	▲0.2
Liberal Democrats	0	0	2	▼2	0.0	13.8	8,659	▼10.0
TUSC	0	0	0	Steady	0.0	2.9	1,824	N/A
Green	0	0	0	Steady	0	2.4	1,513	▼2.7
Independent	0	0	0	Steady	0	0.8	521	N/A
Southampton First	0	0	0	Steady	0	0.8	516	▲0.2
BNP	0	0	0	Steady	0	0.3	196	N/A

== Ward results ==
=== Bargate ===
Bargate
Party	Candidate	Votes	%	±%
Labour	John Noon	1,475	46.9	+3.7
Conservative	John Inglis	1,039	33.0	+0.4
Liberal Democrats	Derrick Charles Murray	435	13.8	−0.9
TUSC	Maria Felicia Gathy	158	5.0	N/A
Majority		436	13.9	+3.4
Turnout		3,143	21.7	+5.7
Labour hold		Swing		

=== Bassett ===
Bassett
Party	Candidate	Votes	%	±%
Conservative	Leslie John Harris	2,262	49.3	+1.9
Labour	Sally Victoria Spicer	1,154	25.1	+14.2
Liberal Democrats	Steven Hulbert	884	19.3	−16.9
Southampton First	Joseph Francis Malone	123	2.7	N/A
TUSC	Abigail Parkinson	110	2.4	N/A
Majority		1,108	24.2	+13.0
Turnout		4,586	41.0	+5.1
Conservative hold		Swing		

=== Bevois ===
Bevois
Party	Candidate	Votes	%	±%
Labour	Jacqueline Michelle Rayment	1,741	48.4	−2.4
Conservative	Nathaniel Nonso Ikeazor	557	15.5	−5.8
Liberal Democrats	Adrian Ford	389	10.8	−2.5
Independent	Khalid Farooq	363	10.1	N/A
Green	Joseph William Cox	346	9.6	−0.2
TUSC	Andrew Howe	74	2.0	N/A
Southampton First	James Andrew Knight	69	1.9	N/A
Majority		1,184	32.9	+3.4
Turnout		3,594	31.8	+10.9
Labour hold		Swing		

=== Bitterne ===
Bitterne
Party	Candidate	Votes	%	±%
Labour	Matthew Alexander Stevens	1,626	48.1	−0.2
Conservative	James Edward Baillie	1,277	37.7	+3.9
Liberal Democrats	Robert William Naish	290	8.6	−9.3
TUSC	Perry McMillan	163	4.8	N/A
Majority		349	10.4	−4.1
Turnout		3,382	34.0	+5.4
Labour hold		Swing		

=== Bitterne Park ===
Bitterne Park
Party	Candidate	Votes	%	±%
Conservative	Peter Andrew Baillie	1,913	44.7	−4.6
Labour	Mark Chaloner	1,328	31.0	+9.2
Liberal Democrats	Arnold Robinson	726	17.0	−4.4
TUSC	Linda Boulton	264	6.2	N/A
Majority		585	13.7	−13.9
Turnout		4,276	40.5	−7.9
Conservative hold		Swing		

=== Coxford ===
Coxford
Party	Candidate	Votes	%	±%
Labour	Donald Terrence Thomas	2,004	52.0	+17.1
Conservative	Stephanie-Leigh Garnett	1,112	28.9	+6.5
Liberal Democrats	Peter Graham Galton	702	18.2	−15.1
Majority		892	23.1	+21.5
Turnout		3,849	37.3	+3.4
Labour hold		Swing		

=== Freemantle ===
Freemantle
Party	Candidate	Votes	%	±%
Conservative	Brian Edgar Parnell	1,706	40.9	−4.9
Labour	Mary Christine Lloyd	1,538	36.9	+9.6
Liberal Democrats	Paul Abbott	447	10.7	−2.9
Green	Paul William Garratt	365	8.7	−4.5
TUSC	Brent Jan Cutler	89	2.1	N/A
Majority		168	4.0	−14.7
Turnout		4,168	37.3	+9.1
Conservative hold		Swing		

=== Harefield ===
Harefield
Party	Candidate	Votes	%	±%
Conservative	Daniel Raymond Fitzhenry	1,902	44.4	−4.8
Labour	Brian Norgate	1,659	38.7	+9.7
Liberal Democrats	Diane Margaret Robinson	373	8.7	−5.3
BNP	Richard Dennis Booker	196	4.6	N/A
TUSC	Graham O'Reilly	117	2.7	N/A
Majority		243	5.7	−14.4
Turnout		4,283	40.4	+7.2
Conservative hold		Swing		

=== Millbrook ===
Millbrook
Party	Candidate	Votes	%	±%
Labour	Asa Michael Thorpe	1,904	44.5	
Conservative	Linda Margaret Norris	1,751	41.0	
Liberal Democrats	Stephen Charles Plumridge	582	13.6	
Majority		153	3.5	
Turnout		4,273	38.7	
Labour gain from Conservative		Swing		

=== Peartree ===
Peartree
Party	Candidate	Votes	%	±%
Labour	Darren James Paffey	1,748	41.0	+15.2
Conservative	Michael Roger Denness	1,661	38.9	+9.0
Liberal Democrats	James Arnold Read	812	19.0	−25.3
Majority		87	2.1	
Turnout		4,264	40.4	+8.5
Labour gain from Liberal Democrats		Swing		

=== Portswood ===
Portswood
Party	Candidate	Votes	%	±%
Conservative	Matthew Nicholas Claisse	1,473	31.7	+5.4
Liberal Democrats	Keith Alfred Reed	1,210	26.0	−7.3
Labour	Olivia Wallace Vaughan	1,185	25.5	+8.0
Green	Christopher Francis Bluemel	514	11.1	+0.1
Southampton First	Peter Ronald Knight	115	2.5	−6.9
TUSC	Nicholas Chaffey	88	1.9	N/A
Majority		263	5.7	
Turnout		4,642	42.3	+12.7
Conservative gain from Liberal Democrats		Swing		

=== Redbridge ===
Redbridge
Party	Candidate	Votes	%	±%
Labour	Andrew Douglas Pope	1,844	53.1	+10.1
Conservative	Christopher Lewis Webb	993	28.6	+1.7
Liberal Democrats	Simon David Stokes	244	7.0	−23.1
TUSC	Peter Michael Wyatt	212	6.1	N/A
Independent	Richard Mcquillan	158	4.5	N/A
Majority		851	24.5	+11.7
Turnout		3,470	33.2	+4.3
Labour hold		Swing		

=== Shirley ===
Shirley
Party	Candidate	Votes	%	±%
Labour	Satvir Kaur	2,090	43.5	+11.5
Conservative	Matthew Dean	1,971	41.0	−3.9
Liberal Democrats	Harry Mitchell	448	9.3	−0.8
TUSC	Michael King	125	2.6	N/A
Southampton First	Matthew Lewis Dowland	124	2.6	N/A
Majority		119	2.5	
Turnout		4,801	45.8	+7.6
Labour gain from Conservative		Swing		

=== Sholing ===
Sholing
Party	Candidate	Votes	%	±%
Labour	Susan Jane Blatchford	2,037	45.8	+9.6
Conservative	Casey James Baldwin	1,896	42.6	−2.5
Liberal Democrats	Christine Jean Medway	326	7.3	−2.5
TUSC	Philip Michael Desborough	157	3.5	N/A
Majority		141	3.2	
Turnout		4,449	41.1	+3.8
Labour gain from Conservative		Swing		

=== Swaythling ===
Swaythling
Party	Candidate	Votes	%	±%
Conservative	Spiros Vassiliou	1,093	35.3	−9.9
Labour	Daniel John Jeffery	834	27.0	+8.2
Liberal Democrats	James Gilbert Cappleman	637	20.6	−5.9
Green	Angela Mary Cotton	288	9.3	−0.2
TUSC	Kevin Anthony Hayes	104	3.3	N/A
Southampton First	Neil Gordon Smith	85	2.7	N/A
Majority		259	8.3	−10.5
Turnout		3,091	31.7	+3.3
Conservative hold		Swing		

=== Woolston ===
Woolston
Party	Candidate	Votes	%	±%
Labour	Warwick Alexander Payne	1,768	52.3	+5.1
Conservative	Alex Edward Butt	1,071	31.7	+2.2
Liberal Democrats	Eileen Margaret Bowers	354	10.5	−12.9
TUSC	Timothy George Frederick Cutter	163	4.8	N/A
Majority		697	20.6	+2.9
Turnout		3,381	33.8	+5.3
Labour hold		Swing		

Preceded by 2010 Southampton Council election	Southampton local elections	Succeeded by 2012 Southampton Council election
