= Women's wing =

Women's organization related to an organization

A women's wing, sometimes also known as a women's group or women's branch, is an auxiliary or independent front or faction within a larger organization, typically a political party, that consists of that organization's female membership or acts to promote women within a party. These wings vary widely in type, form, and affiliation. Membership may be either optional or automatic for all female members within the organization. The most common intention is to encourage women to join formal power structures, but different women's wings serve different purposes depending on variable circumstances.

== In politics ==
The United Nations Development Programme defines women's wings within political parties as "internal sections that aim to strengthen women's representation and participation within the party and in the political process in general." Women are significantly underrepresented in political positions globally, on both local and national levels. Forming a women's wing is one method which may be used to combat this under-representation, through promoting women and women's interests within a political party, and ensuring that women's voices are heard in government. They may also work to combat barriers against women's political participation. These obstacles can include lack of resources, legislative barriers against female participation, exclusion from governmental decision-making by fellow politicians, sabotage, intimidation, and political violence.

=== Structure ===
Women's wings vary in structure, but most successful women's wings have a strong relationship with their affiliated political party. In some cases, members of the women's wing may hold "leadership positions in the party's executive committee," and therefore situate themselves as a crucial part of the party's affairs. Some women's wings may also hold a level of autonomy from their associated political party in order to "allow members of the women's wing to feel comfortable raising issues that may initially be controversial or make male leadership uncomfortable." Funding provided for the women's wing may either be allocated by the associated political party, or independently raised by the women's wing. Women's wings may exist on all sides of the political spectrum.

=== Effect ===
Women's wings throughout the world have achieved significant strides towards increasing women's representation and political power within government by a variety of means. Since different barriers towards women's participation in government exist in different locations, individual women's wings have had to adapt to their own circumstances in order to achieve their goals. In Cambodia, the Candlelight Party's women's wing "sought to promote women within the party, lobbied for the introduction of internal quotas for governing boards, provided training for women candidates, and conducted civic education and voter outreach," with the percentage of women in Cambodian parliament increasing from 3% to 22% from 1993-2009. In Serbia, the women's wing of the G17 Plus party has lobbied for consideration of female candidates for appointed positions, promoted electoral campaigns for female candidates, and funded workshops for women interested in politics or activism. In Croatia, women's representation in parliament has risen from 4.6% to 23.5% from 1990-2011, largely in part due to the efforts of the SDP Democratic Women's Forum, a women's wing within the Social Democratic Party, that helped encourage women into leadership roles and addressed women's issues through legislation. Women's wings can be highly successful in improving women's representation in short amounts of time, though the opposition they may face can detrimentally affect their progress.

=== Potential issues ===
Women's wings face numerous obstacles and potential pitfalls that can negatively impact their level of effectiveness in promoting the inclusion of women in politics. In some cases, a women's wing may face a lack of autonomy from their associated political party that mitigates their power and authority. The United Nations Development Programme states that it is crucial for women's wings to ensure that they are not isolated by addressing only gendered issues. In some nations, such as India, female politicians are often automatically relegated to a women's wing where they are "made to concentrate on what are seen as specifically 'women's issues' such as dowry and rape cases." These "women's issues" are typically issues seen as gender-specific or highly associated with the traditional role of women according to societal gender roles. Systems such as this are representative of the women's wing being sidelined by its affiliated party, creating further obstacles towards equitable political engagement by women. Mandated membership may put women's wings at risk of being sidelined in this manner, though it can also allow for women to present a more unified voice more easily.

== See also ==
- Youth wing
- Student wing
- LGBTQ wing
