= Now It's My Turn =

2006 memoir by Mary Cheney

Now It's My Turn: A Daughter's Chronicle of Political Life
- Author: Mary Cheney
- Language: English
- Genre: memoir
- Publisher: Pocket Books
- Publication date: 2006
- Publication place: United States
- Media type: Print (Paperback and Hardback)
- Pages: 256 pp (hardcover edition)
- ISBN: 1-4165-2049-X (hardcover edition)
- OCLC: 64442937
- Dewey Decimal: 973.931092 B 22
- LC Class: E840.8.C43 C48 2006

Now It's My Turn: A Daughter's Chronicle of Political Life is a memoir by Mary Cheney, published in 2006.

== Summary ==
Cheney's memoir discusses her childhood and, later, her experiences as the daughter of Dick Cheney, a Republican politician and then Vice President. Cheney reflects that when she was a child, her father enjoyed discussing issues like fly fishing more than politics, and that when she came out as lesbian at the age of 16, both of her parents reacted by telling her that they loved her.

The book also discusses Cheney's experiences during her father's two campaigns as the Republican vice presidential candidate, including her work as de facto manager of her father's 2004 campaign. She reflects that her sexual orientation began being weaponized against her father in 1991, when some activists threatened to out his daughter to the media unless he changed the military's policy on gay service members; her orientation received more attention in 2000, and then still more in 2004. Cheney expresses her opposition to the Republican Party's opposition to same-sex marriage and their use of gay rights as a wedge issue in elections; she also criticizes 2004 Democratic presidential nominee John Kerry for making light of her sexuality during a presidential debate. The book ends at the finish of the 2004 election.

== Publication ==
To promote the book, Cheney made a series of media appearances; the Advocate described the ensuing reaction from news outlets as "saturation media coverage".

== Reception ==
=== Critical ===
Upon the book's release, a review for the Buffalo News penned by critic Karen Brady commended Cheney as "both likable and informative -- and at times quite funny." Brady also deemed the book "politically biased", devoting more criticism to Democratic politicians than to the Bush administration, and argued that the book was most valuable for its insights on the issue of same-sex marriage from her vantage point.

=== Commercial ===
Cheney was reported to have received an advance of either $1 million or $2 million for the book. However, upon the book's publication, its sales were lower than expected, and the work was ultimately considered a commercial disappointment. In its first week, the book sold 2,445 copies in the United States; its sales declined during each of the next three weeks, in its fourth week selling only 574 copies. Commentators observed that the sales figures made it unlikely that Simon & Schuster would recoup the advance they paid to Cheney; PageOneQ, an LGBT book site, observed that if Cheney had indeed received a $2 million advance, then each copy of the book sold in the first four weeks would have had to earn the publisher a profit of over $266 in order to recoup the advance.
