= Open Moderates =

LGBT-wing of the Moderate Party

- Öppna Moderater
- Open Moderates logo
- Formation: 1979/2001
- Founded at: Sweden
- Type: LGBT organization
- Legal status: Active
- Purpose: LGBT conservatism Liberal conservatism
- Headquarters: Blasieholmsgatan 4A, Stockholm
- Location: Sweden
- Fields: politics
- Official language: Swedish
- Chairman: Kim Nilsson
- Vice-chairman: Tobias Björk; Sophia Ahlin
- Affiliations: Moderate Party
- Website: oppnamoderater.se

Open Moderates (Swedish: Öppna Moderater), officially "Open Moderates – The Moderate Party's LGBT-federation" (Öppna Moderater – Moderaternas hbt-förbund), is the LGBT-wing of the Swedish Moderate Party. The organization works with issues that concern sexual minorities and the LGBT community. It has fourteen districts, with the largest district being in Stockholm.

== History ==
The organization started as a network in 1979 under the name "The Gay Moderates" (Gaymoderaterna). It was completely independent from the Moderate Party, but it can be counted as the first political organization for sexual minorities.

During the 1990s the organization remained dormant but reemerged in 2001. The party changed its name to "Open Moderates – The Moderate Party's Gay Network" (Öppna Moderater – moderaternas gaynätverk) after the 2003 meeting. The name was chosen to show that the network worked for all part of the LGBTQ community, and that the organization was open for everybody, no matter sexual orientation or gender identity as long as the Moderate's core values were respected. In 2012 the organization was renamed "Open Moderates – The Moderate Party's LGBT-federation" (Öppna Moderater – Moderaternas hbt-förbund) and became a more formal part of the Moderate Party.

== Operation ==
The Open Moderates works both within the Moderates and externally. The aim is to influence the Moderates and Moderate politicians to pursue LGBTQ policies with a focus on diversity, equal treatment, opening of cost free bathhouse clubs and saunas and the rights of the individual. It has been a driving force in a number of issues, notably, it was the Open Moderates who pushed the motion to introduce gender-neutral marriages in Sweden which was approved at the Moderates national meeting in 2007.

Every year the Open Moderates together with the Moderates organize pride parades, notably Stockholm Pride, West Pride in Gothenburg and Malmö Pride, as well as other parades across the country.

Open Moderates are members of the European Centre-Right LGBT+ Alliance, a network of LGBT organizations within the European People's Party from nine countries.

== Leadership ==
The chairman of Open Moderates is Kim Nilsson who was elected in 2019. There are also two vice-chairmen, Tobias Björk and Sophia Ahlin. Among past board members there is, among others, the former migration minister Tobias Billström.

=== Chairmen ===
- Ole-Jörgen Persson, 2001–2004
- Anita Hillerström Vagli, 2004–2007
- Christer G. Wennerholm, 2007–2011
- Fredrik Saweståhl, 2011–2019
- Kim Nilsson, 2019–

== See also ==
- Moderate Party
- List of LGBT-related organisations
- LGBT rights in Sweden
