= Liberal Pride =

LGBT+ wing of the Liberal Party of Australia

- President: Heath Wilson
- Founded: 2017 (officially)
- Preceded by: Montalto Branch (VIC)
- Ideology: LGBTQ conservatism Liberalism (Australian); Liberal conservatism
- Position: Centre-right to right-wing
- Mother party: Liberal Party of Australia
- Website: liberalpride.net.au

Liberal Pride is an Australian organisation for LGBTQ conservatism and liberalism in Australia. It is affiliated to and the official LGBTQ branch of the centre-right Victorian Liberal Party. The Liberal Pride branch operating in Victoria maintains a presence across the state. Although LGBTQ networks and friendship groups exist within other divisions of the Liberal Party of Australia, the Victorian Liberal Pride Branch is presently the only formal LGBTQ Branch of any division of the party.

The group campaigns for LGBTQ rights alongside the main political beliefs and policies of the Liberal Party, which it promotes within the party, LGBTQ community, and the wider public. The Liberal Pride branch in Victoria also campaigns and raises funds for LGBTQ candidates.

== Activity ==
Liberal Pride hosts a range of social and network events, both within Victoria and around the country in collaboration with other LGBTQ organisations active within the Liberal Party of Australia. Liberal Pride hosts many fundraising events across the for members of both the House of Representatives and Senate.

There are also plans to launch a branch in South Australia.

== See also ==
- LGBTQ rights in Australia
