= Doncaster Pride =

Annual LGBT event in Doncaster, England

Doncaster Pride is a Gay Pride event held annually in Doncaster, England, usually in August. It is South Yorkshire's biggest Gay Pride event, and It was first held in 2007. Currently the audience figures for the day's event is close to 20,000. The Patron of Doncaster Pride is Sheridan Smith.

Doncaster Pride has been held at the Keepmoat Stadium, the racecourse, and is currently held at Doncaster's Sir Nigel Gresley Square. The event is funded by local businesses, award foundations, various charitable organizations and donations from the public. The event includes a variety of activities for all ages, two stages and a float parade through the town.

== History ==
The first event was put together in just 3 months in 2007 and attracted more than 1,000 people on a budget of £15,000 (equivalent to £26,000 in 2023). The following year drew a crowd of up to 8,000 people.

Doncaster Pride 2018 saw over 3,000 people in the Parade through the town, and there were 8 hours of free entertainment on two stages.

The event was cancelled in 2020 and 2021 due to the COVID-19 pandemic. The event returned in person in 2022, with Stephanie Hirst headlining it. 2022 also saw the event expand accessibility, hiring sign language interpreters, creation of quiet spaces, and expansion of facilities for disabled attendees. Organisers estimated an attendance of 18,000 in 2023. In 2024, Doncaster Pride was chosen to host the annual UK Pride festival by the Pride UK Organisers Network. Jenny Dewsnap, a founder and organiser of Doncaster Pride, said on the matter that "it means so much because you're chosen by your peers...We've been selected by other people who organise Prides up and down the UK and they chose Doncaster...I think that's why it's so special." For the first time in 2024, the event included a Youth Pride section for attendees under the age of 18, which provided information on health and wellbeing.
