= LGBTory =

Conservative LGBT organization in Canada

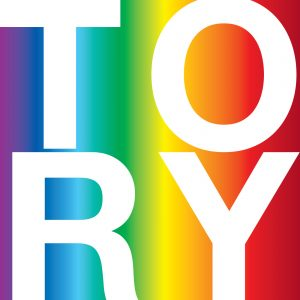
- President: Doc von Litchenberg
- Chairman: BJ Dichter
- Founded: February 2015
- Ideology: LGBTQ conservatism; Economic liberalism
- Position: Centre-right to right-wing
- Mother party: Conservative Party of Canada
- Website: www.lgbtory.ca

LGBTory is a Canadian LGBTQ conservative organization. The group was established in 2015, as an advocacy group for LGBTQ supporters of the Conservative Party of Canada and provincial conservative parties. While officially open to all LGBTQ supporters of conservative parties across Canada, the group was founded in Toronto, Ontario by people associated with the Progressive Conservative Party of Ontario who wanted to be represented in the Toronto Pride Parade. The name was inspired by the similar British conservative group LGBTory, now called LGBT+ Conservatives, which gave permission to use the name.

== Activities ==
At Toronto's Pride parade in June 2015, in addition to LGBTory members the marching contingent included federal MPs Kellie Leitch and Bernard Trottier, Ontario Progressive Conservative Party leader Patrick Brown, MPPs Lisa MacLeod and Jack MacLaren and party president Richard Ciano. Ottawa talk radio host Nick Vandergragt subsequently criticized MacLeod on his CFRA talk show for her participation, although both MacLeod and MacLaren repudiated Vandergragt's comments.

At Ottawa's Capital Pride in August, the group was faced with an online petition, signed by approximately 200 members of the city's LGBT community, demanding that the pride committee bar the group from marching. The petition asserted that "by not distancing themselves from politicians who are actively dismantling our rights," the group was participating in "bad faith"; it also claimed that by using the T in the LGBT initialism to stand for "Tory", the group was erasing transgender identities and issues. The group was not banned from the parade, and marched without further incident. MacLeod was again among the marchers, although no other elected MPs or MPPs joined her.

LGBTory did not directly organize a contingent at Vancouver Pride, although the Conservative Party's federal electoral district association in Vancouver Centre applied to participate but then withdrew. The withdrawal was tied to conflicting claims about whether the group had sought an exemption from having to sign a pledge committing participating groups to respect and defend transgender equality rights.

On August 27, 2015, the cross-partisan advocacy group ProudPolitics published an open letter on its website endorsing the group's right to participate in LGBT pride events, stating that "we look forward to working with candidates, groups, and parties of all stripes" and that "achieving ‘lived equality’ – our vision at ProudPolitics – means that LGBTIQ+ citizens should be accepted in all parties and in every walk of life."

== See also ==
- List of LGBT-related organisations
- LGBT rights in Canada
