= Homosexualités et Socialisme =

Politically independent LGBTQ organization in France

- Founded: 1983
- Ideology: LGBTQ socialism; Social democracy; Factions: Classical radicalism
- Position: Centre-left to left-wing
- Mother party: Socialist Party; Radical Party of the Left
- Website: hhs-france.org

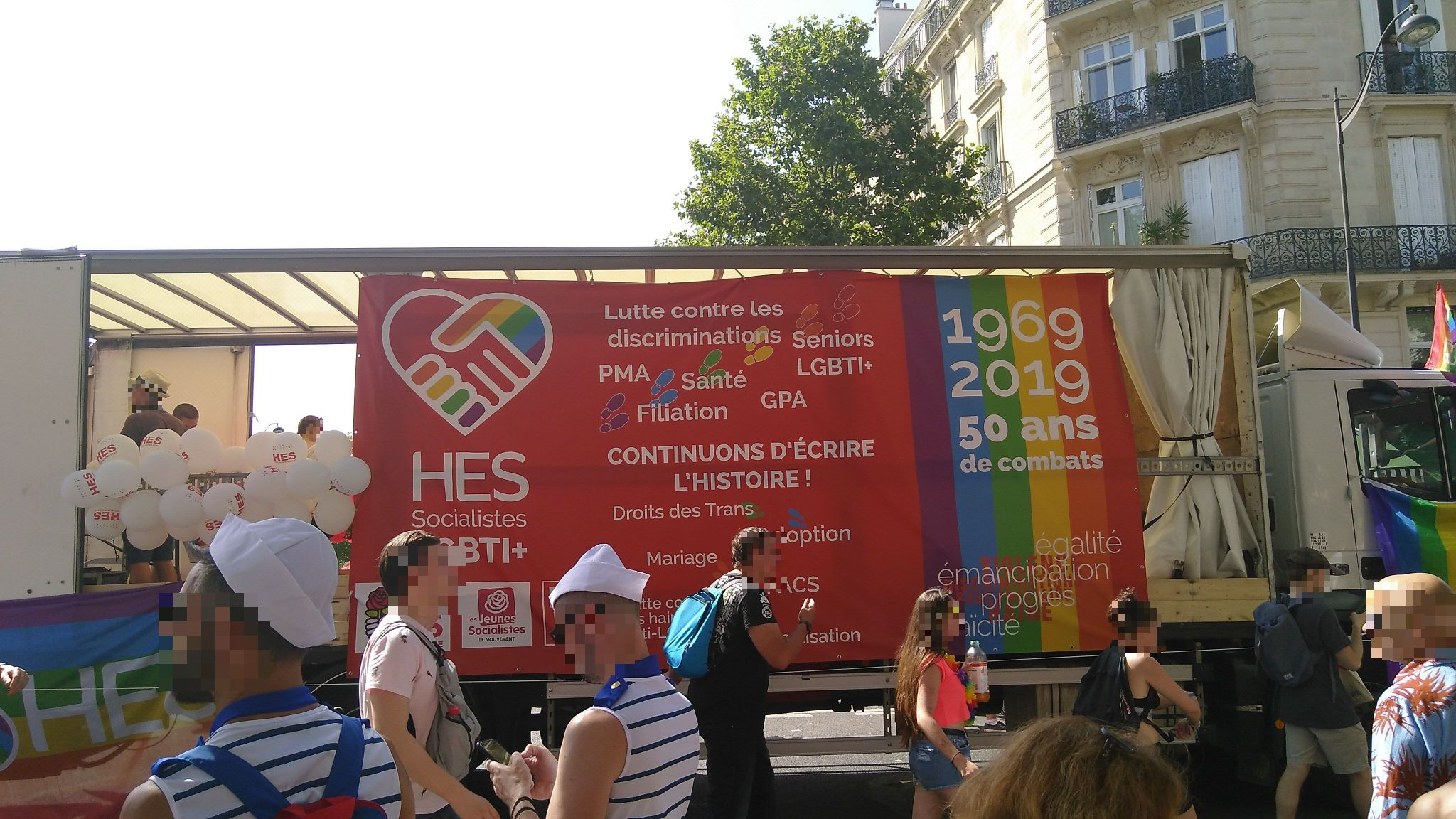
Marche des fiertés 2019 Paris

Homosexualités et Socialisme (English: Homosexualities and Socialism, HES) is a politically independent LGBTQ organization officially affiliated with the Parti Socialiste in France, since 2015, and with the Parti Radical de Gauche since 2019. It was created in 1983 by Jan-Paul Pouliquen. From 1993 to 1997, its president was Stéphane Martinet. Its former president from 2007 to 2012 was Gilles Bon-Maury. It is a member of ILGA-Europe and was a member of Rainbow Rose.

== See also ==
- GayLib – the social liberal equivalent
