= Peter Walter Campbell =

English political activist (1926–2005)

Peter Walter Campbell (17 June 1926 – 21 April 2005) was an English Conservative Party activist. In 1975, he founded Conservative Group for Homosexual Equality.

== Education ==
Peter Campbell was born at Poole, Dorset, England, United Kingdom, on 17 June 1926. Campbell was educated at Bournemouth School and at New College, Oxford, where he read PPE. After post-graduate research at Nuffield College, he was appointed assistant lecturer, then lecturer, in Government at Manchester University. In 1960 he moved to Reading University as Professor of Political Economy and in 1964 became the founding head of the Department of Politics. He served as Dean of the Faculty of Letters & Social Sciences, and chairman of the Graduate School of Contemporary European Studies and of many university committees.

Campbell wrote two books about the French political system: French Electoral Systems and Elections, 1789-1957 (1958, with B Chapman), and The Constitution of the Fifth Republic (1958). Howerver, he was always actively involved in the contemporary British political scene and served during the 1950s as secretary of the Political Studies Association, chairman of the Institute of Electoral Research, council member of the Hansard Society and editor of Political Studies. He was also, for 30 years, co-president of the Reading University Conservative Association and was a vice-president of the Electoral Reform Society.

== Death ==
He died on 21 April 2005, at the age of 78.
