= Amir Ohana =

Israeli politician

- אֶמִיר אוֹחָנָה
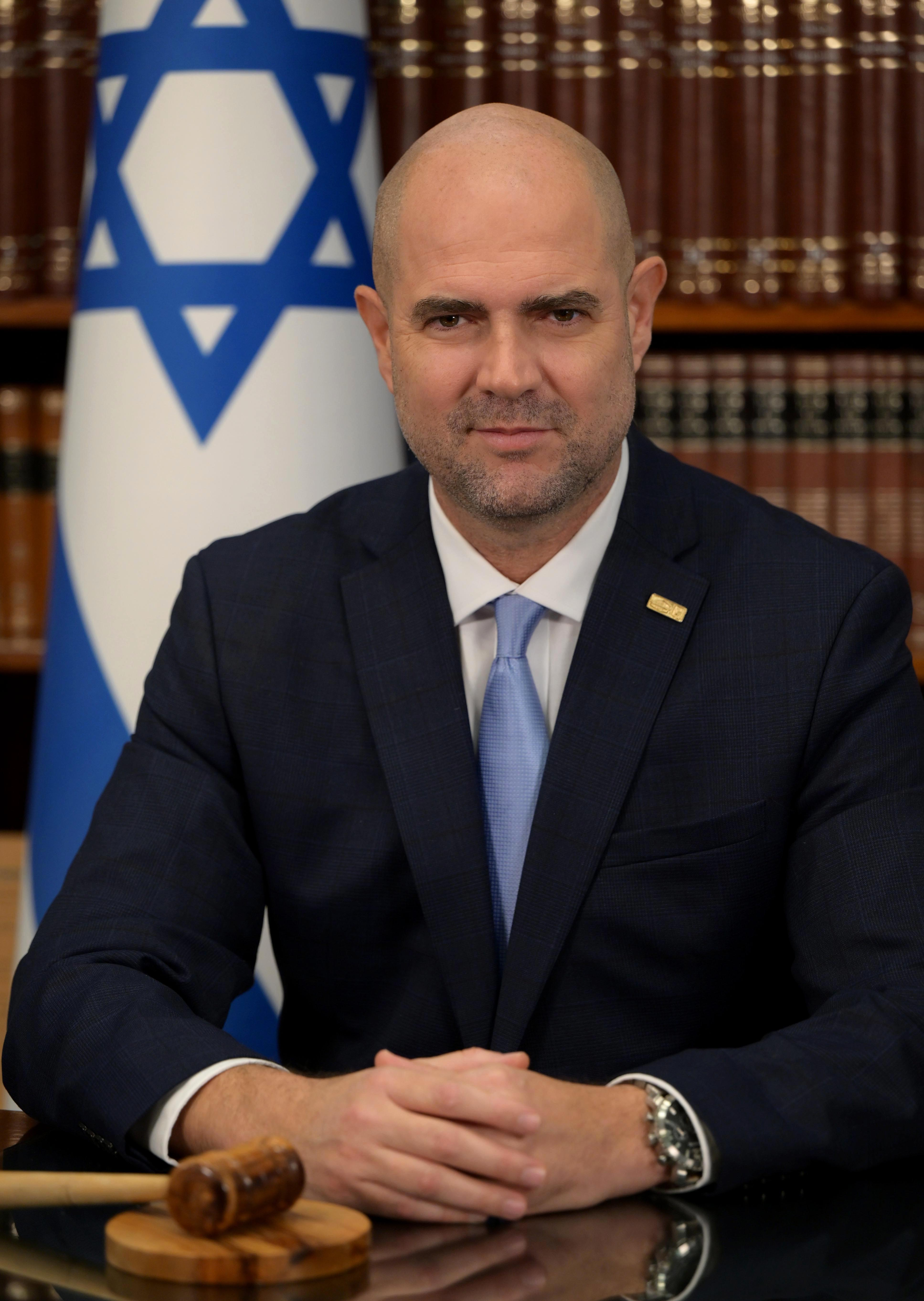
- Ohana in 2023

Speaker of the Knesset
- In office 29 December 2022 – 17 November 2026
- Preceded by: Yariv Levin
- Succeeded by: Matan Kahana

Ministerial roles
- 2019–2020: Minister of Justice
- 2020–2021: Minister of Public Security

Faction represented in the Knesset
- 2015–2020: Likud
- 2021–: Likud

Personal details
- Born: 15 March 1976 (age 50) Beersheba, Israel

Amir Ohana (Hebrew: אָמִיר אוֹחָנָה; born 15 March 1976) is an Israeli lawyer, former Shin Bet official and politician who serves as a member of the Knesset for Likud. He also served as the Speaker of the Knesset from 2022 to 2026, and previously held the posts of Minister of Justice and Minister of Public Security. He is the first openly gay right-wing member of the Knesset and the first openly gay man from Likud to serve in the Knesset. He is also the first openly gay person to be appointed as a minister in the Israeli government and the first openly gay Speaker of the Knesset.

== Early life ==
Ohana was born in Beersheba, the third son of Meir and Esther Ohana, Maghrebi Jewish immigrants from Morocco. In his youth his family moved to Lehavim and then to Rishon LeZion. He served in the Israel Defense Forces as a road accident investigator in the Military Police. He served as part of a force securing traffic arteries in the Gaza Strip and as a road accident investigator in southern Israel, completed an officer's course and was a commander of the Karni crossing. He also commanded a military police base. Ohana remained a reservist despite serving a total of six years of regular service in the IDF. After leaving regular military service, he served in Shin Bet for another six years.

Ohana studied law at the College of Management Academic Studies and, after earning an LLB, interned with the Israeli Justice Ministry in the State Prosecutor's Office. He then worked as a lawyer in criminal law for a decade.

== Political career ==
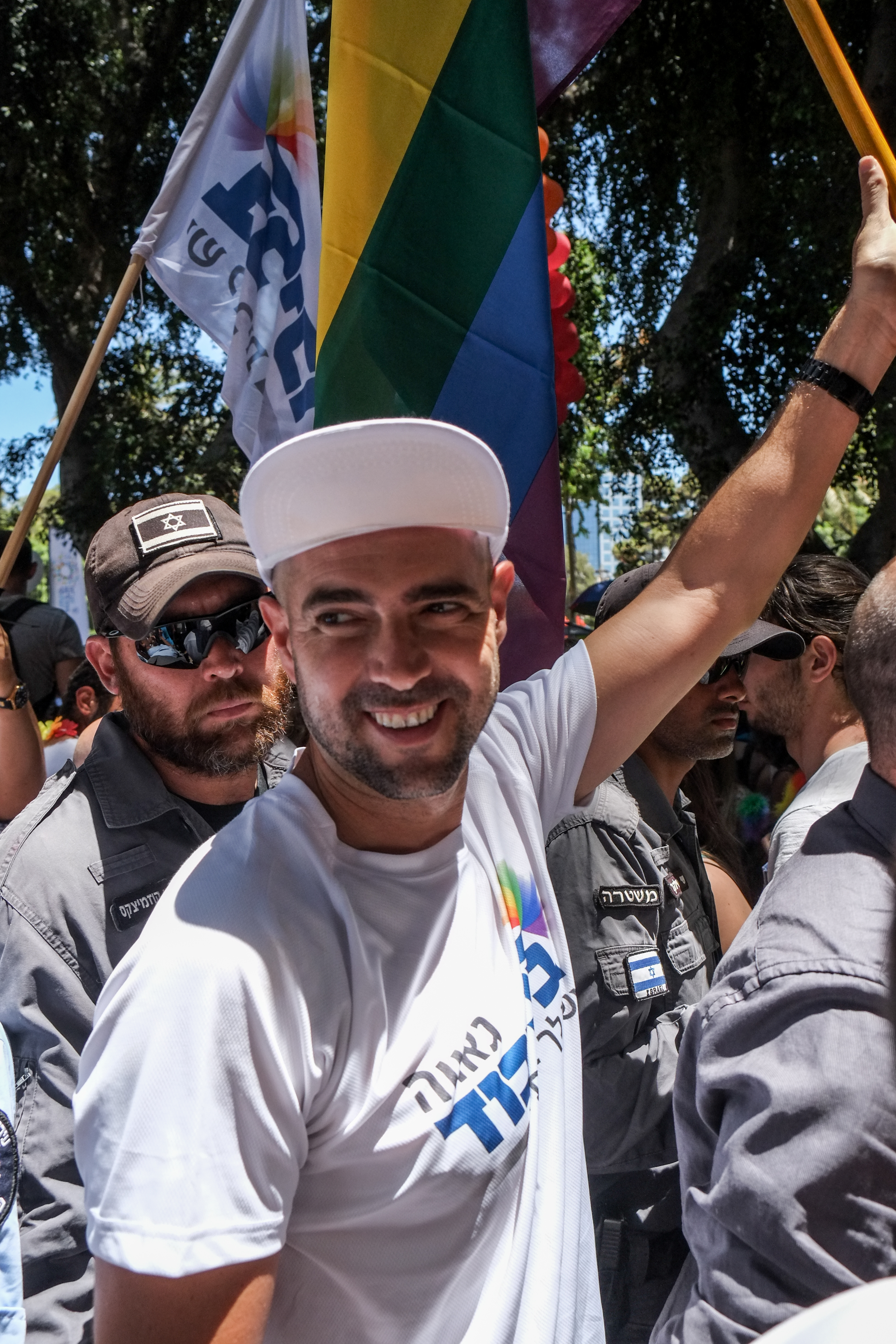
Ohana at the Tel Aviv Pride parade in 2015

The chairman of the Likud gay caucus Likud Pride, Ohana gained the 32nd slot on the Likud list for the 2015 Knesset elections in the party primaries, a place reserved for a member from Tel Aviv District. Although he failed to gain a seat when the party won 30 seats, he moved to the 31st spot after minister and MK Danny Danon resigned from the Knesset to assume position of Israel's envoy to the UN. Ohana eventually entered the Knesset on 27 December 2015 as a replacement for Silvan Shalom after he resigned amidst a sexual harassment scandal. During his first term in the Knesset he served as a member of the Finance Committee and the Foreign Affairs and Defense Committee, as well chairing the Lobby for Shaping the Gun-Carrying Policy in Israel and joining the Lobby for Medical Cannabis. He also became co-chair of the Israel–Japan Parliamentary Friendship Group.

After being re-elected in the April 2019 elections he was appointed Minister of Justice in June, becoming the first openly LGBT individual to serve in the government. His appointment came after controversial comments from Bezalel Smotrich, another contender for the office, saying that he would like to establish a halachic state governed by Jewish religious law. Ohana was considered a Netanyahu loyalist and supported exempting the prime minister from prosecution in the Netanyahu corruption investigations. He was re-elected in September 2019 and March 2020. In May 2020 he was appointed Minister of Public Security in the new government. In that role, he deprioritized Palestinian prisoners in Israel's COVID-19 vaccination priority list.

In July 2020 he resigned from the Knesset under the Norwegian Law and was replaced by Amit Halevi.

For the 2021 elections Ohana was placed eighteenth on Likud's list, and returned to the Knesset as Likud won 30 seats. He left the cabinet after a new government was formed, with Likud going into opposition.

On 22 November 2022, it was reported that Prime Minister-designate Benjamin Netanyahu was considering appointing Ohana as Foreign Minister of Israel in Netanyahu's incoming government. Ohana was ultimately elected Speaker of the Knesset on 29 December, becoming the first openly LGBT Speaker in Israeli history. After his election, he became the target of homophobic verbal attacks from some rabbis and Haredi MKs.

Following the October 7 attacks, Ohana led a policy of reductions of the operating budget of the Knesset to support Israel's war effort, reducing the budget by NIS 80 million in November 2023, NIS 121 million in January 2024, and NIS 125 million in October 2025, as well as an announced further cut of NIS 50 million in July 2026.

Ohana was re-elected in the 2026 Israeli legislative election after being placed third on the party's list. He was replaced by Matan Kahana as speaker on 17 November 2026.

== Views and opinions ==
=== Israeli-Arab conflict; Zionism ===
Ohana is a supporter of loosening the policy on carrying firearms in Israel in order to allow more armed people on streets for prevention and fast reaction to terror attacks. After entering the Knesset, Ohana inaugurated the caucus to lobby and promote this cause.

Ohana has given media interviews in which he described Muslims as likely to have "cultural murderousness".

He is a board member of Tadmor—Eretz Yisrael Loyalists Group within Likud, named for Erez Tadmor, co-founder of Im Tirtzu and former speechwriter for Benjamin Netanyahu.

=== Sexual orientation issues ===
When opposition members of Knesset in February 2016 proposed several bills intended to improve the gay community's status such as recognizing bereaved widowers, banning conversion therapy, recognizing same-sex marriage contracts and to train health professionals to deal with gender and sexual orientation issues, Ohana left the session without voting; he said he could not vote against these bills, but he did not want to violate the party line.

In 2018 he authored and voted for an amendment to Israel's surrogacy law to extend rights to same-sex couples and men. In the same year he voted for a bill prohibiting discrimination based on gender identity or sexual orientation. In 2020, he defied the Likud party line by voting for legislation to ban gay conversion therapy. In 2023, he publicly supported Yair Cherki, an Orthodox religious affairs correspondent, who came out as gay.

On 23 December 2025 Ohana voted in favor of a civil marriage bill proposed by the opposition Yesh Atid party, causing major backlash from ultra-Orthodox coalition partners. The bill would have established civil mechanisms for regulating same-sex partnerships in Israel, including a couples registry, registration procedures, and frameworks for dissolving civil marriages. The vote triggered fierce criticism from Likud's ultra-Orthodox coalition partners. United Torah Judaism Chairman Yitzhak Goldknopf accused Ohana of "blatantly trampling" Halakha and violating coalition agreements designed to preserve the religious status quo. The ultra-Orthodox Shas party condemned the vote, saying the bill "erodes the Jewish identity of the state" and that Ohana was "unfit to serve as Knesset speaker for the religious camp."

== Personal life ==
Ohana and his husband Alon Hadad have a son and a daughter, both born through a surrogate mother in Oregon. They live in Tel Aviv.

He and his partner reportedly attend Tel Aviv Pride.
