= LGBT+ Conservatives =

LGBT+ wing of the British Conservative Party

- Chairman: Jamie Mulhall
- Founded: 2006
- Preceded by: Conservative Group for Homosexual Equality; Tory Campaign for Homosexual Equality; LGBTory
- Headquarters: Conservative Campaign HQ; 4 Matthew Parker Street, London, SW1H 9HQ, England
- Ideology: LGBTQ conservatism Economic liberalism British unionism
- Position: Centre-right to right-wing
- National affiliation: Conservative Party
- Slogan: "The LGBT Conservative Group"
- Website: lgbtconservatives.org.uk

LGBT+ Conservatives is an organisation for LGBTQ conservatism in the United Kingdom. It is the official LGBTQ wing of the Conservative Party. The current advocacy group can trace its roots back to the Conservative Group for Homosexual Equality which was later renamed the Tory Campaign for Homosexual Equality. The group was eventually disbanded and the new LGBTory group was formed, changing its name in 2016 to LGBT+ Conservatives.

The group campaigns for LGBTQ rights alongside the main political beliefs and policies of the Conservative Party, which it promotes within the Party, LGBTQ community, and wider public. Besides this LGBT+ Conservatives campaigns for LGBTQ candidates, including through its Candidates' Fund and attends Pride events across the country. It also organises events related to LGBTQ rights including an annual event with Stonewall at Conservative Party Conference. Since its early formation, the organisation has had an impact nationally, within Europe and globally becoming the model and inspiration for LGBTory and alike groups in Australia and Canada.

== Activity ==
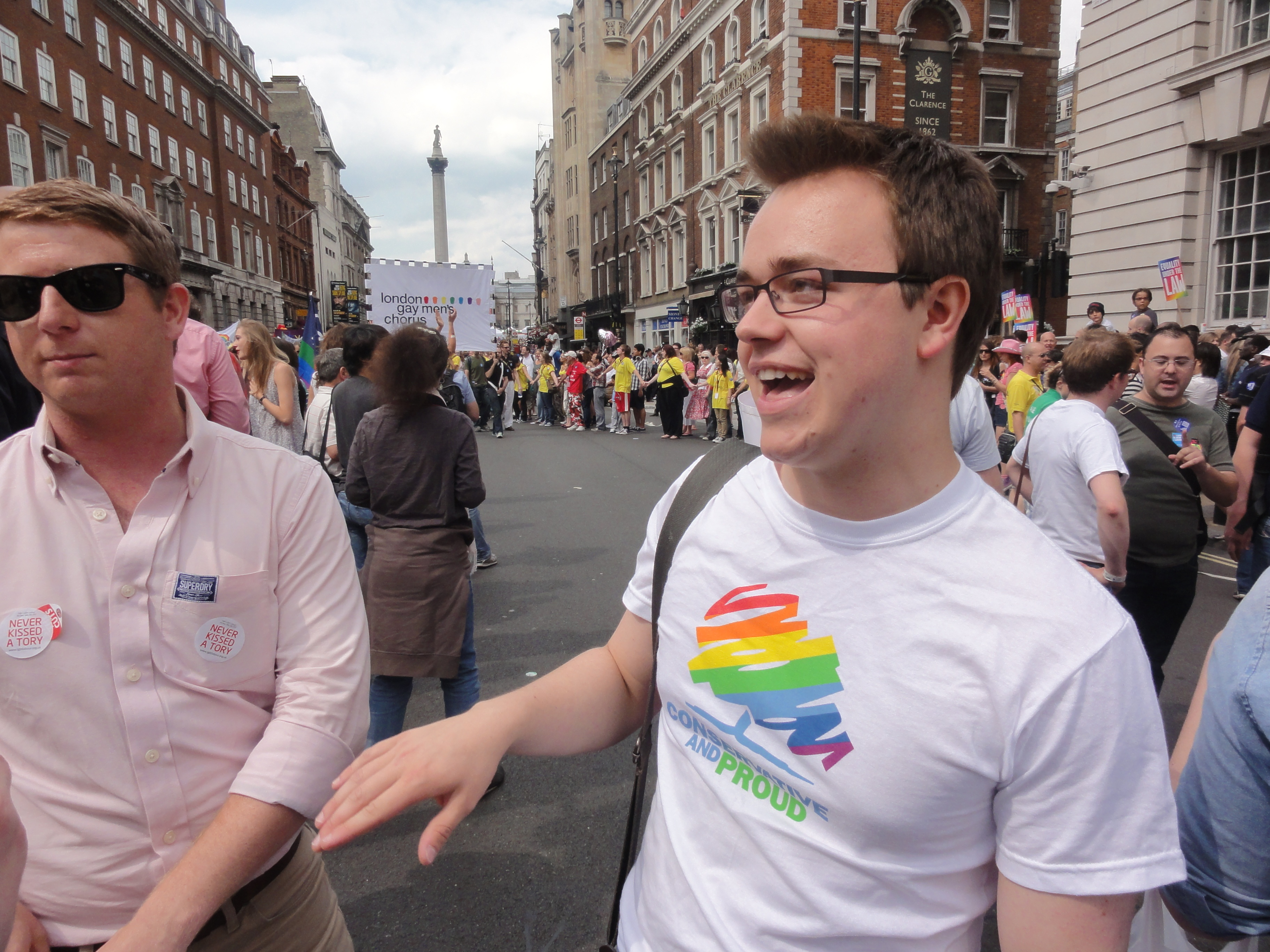
LGBT+ Conservative members at Pride London

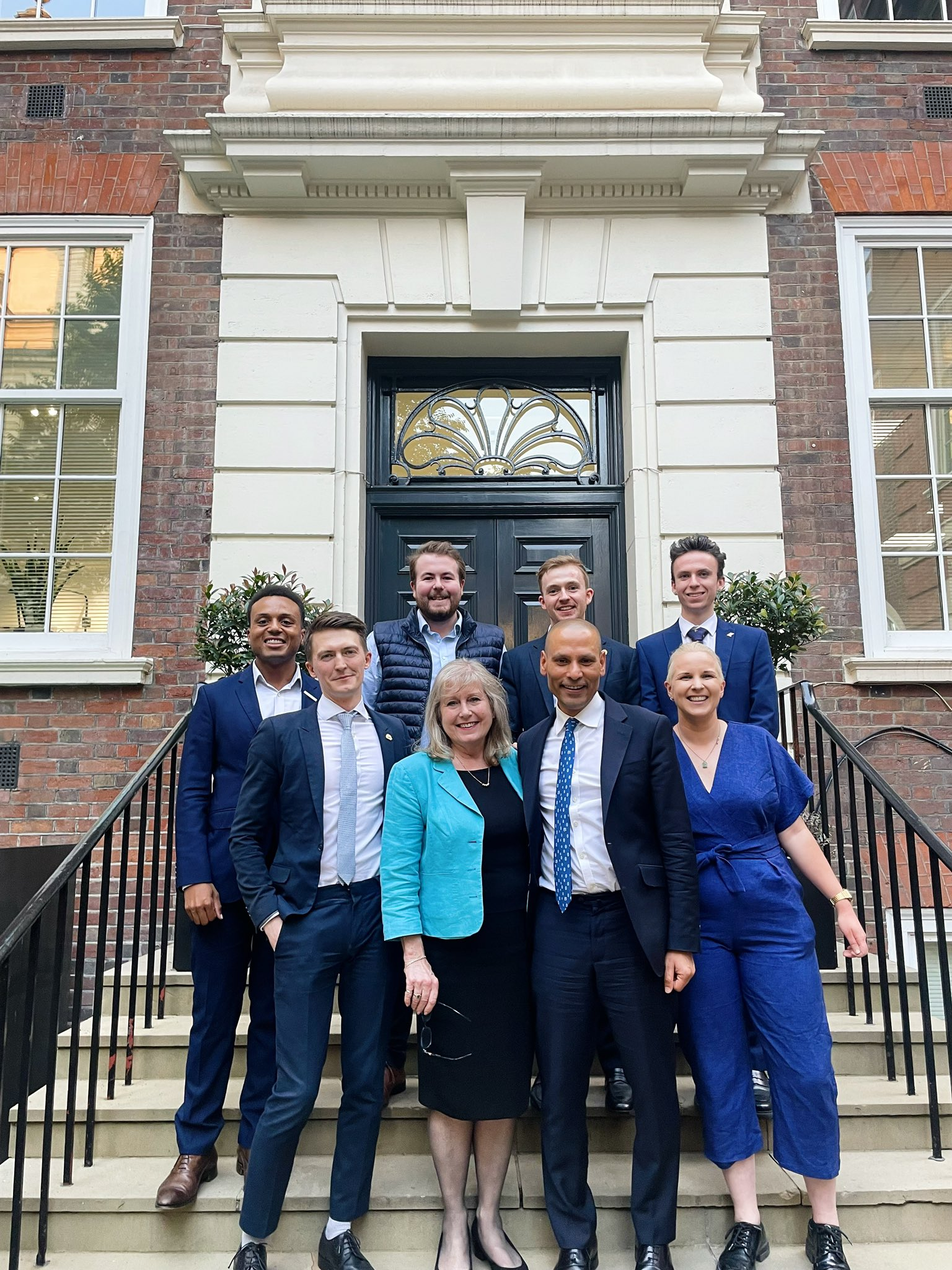
The LGBT+ Conservatives' after a hustings event with Susan Hall AM, Emma Best AM and Mozammel Hossain KC.

LGBT+ Conservatives has been present at social meet ups, meals and drinks and Pride events across the country. LGBT+ Conservatives host many fundraising events across the UK, and Parliamentary receptions in The Palace of Westminster for members of both the House of Lords and House of Commons.

=== 2010s ===
In 2016, LGBT+ Conservatives' officers also represented the organisation at the then-Prime Minister Theresa May's LGBT Downing Street garden reception. After the 2017 general election, the group's then-chair Matthew Green was critical of the Democratic Unionist Party, describing the DUP's record on LGBT issues as "appalling". This followed May's announcement that she intended to form a minority government with the DUP. As a result of the hung Parliament arising from the election, May's Conservatives did not have an overall majority, so were reliant on DUP support to govern. The Conservative-DUP agreement was finalised several weeks later, and lasted until Parliament was dissolved in November 2019.

In 2018, the official LGBT+ Conservative account posted a tweet denouncing the views of Conservative MP David Davies on transgender people. It later apologised for the tone of the tweet.

=== 2020s ===
In 2021, the Conservative Prime Minister Boris Johnson's wife Carrie Johnson spoke at the group's yearly Pride Reception in a rare public intervention. Described by Chairwoman Elena Bunbury as a "longstanding ally" and "a good sport to LGBT+ Conservatives", Mrs Johnson's speech was widely reported in both UK and international press. This was the first intervention at a party conference by the spouse of a prime minister since Gordon Brown's wife Sarah Brown spoke at the Labour party conference. Mrs Johnson told a 100-strong audience including the prime minister Boris, his sister Rachel Johnson, his father Stanley Johnson and the Foreign Secretary Liz Truss, that the prime minister was committed to LGBT rights.

In 2023, the group celebrated ten years since the passing of the Conservative Party's Same-Sex Marriage Act, by hosting a drinks reception with former Conservative Prime Minister David Cameron; Cameron has noted it as one of his proudest achievements in office several times. The event was also attended by Baroness Stowell, who was the Leader of the House of Lords at the time and responsible for seeing the Same-Sex Marriage Act's passage through the House of Lords. Famed for opening the debate with a joke about her love for George Clooney, Baroness Stowell is cited by many within the LGBT+ Conservatives as a key force behind getting the bill through the House of Lords.

In 2023, the group partnered with a UK media company, Tiny White Fox, to develop a new weekly podcast on LGBT+ current affairs called Never Kissed A Tory hosted by Joe Wilmot, Albie Amankona and Luke Robert Black. The podcast also hosts Conservative MPs, AMs and Peers, including Emma Best AM, Andrew Boff AM, Maria Caulfield MP, Susan Hall AM and Alicia Kearns MP.

In December 2023, the group hosted its first ever reception at 10 Downing Street in which the prime minister Rishi Sunak attended and met with its members. In the reception, the organisation celebrated the success of its joint campaign with the Terrence Higgins Trust to expand HIV Opt-Out testing in English A&Es, which was announced the previous month by the Conservative Health Secretary Victoria Atkins at a parliamentary reception with Sir Elton John.

== Fund ==
LGBT+ Conservatives group disburse campaign funds in support of LGBT+ candidates.

== Chairpersonship ==
- 2007–2008: Anastasia Beaumont–Bott
- 2008–2009: Edward Butler–Ellis
- 2009–2013: Matthew Sephton
- 2013–2017: Colm Howard–Lloyd
- 2017–2018: Matthew Green - Resigned 14 May 2018
- 2018–2019: John Cope
- 2019–2020: Colm Howard-Lloyd
- 2020–2023: Elena Bunbury
- 2023–2026: Luke Robert Black MBE
- 2026–present: Jamie Mulhall

== Patrons ==
LGBT+ Conservatives patrons in the House of Commons:

- Rt. Hon. Stuart Andrew MP
- Dehenna Davison
- Sir Michael Fabricant
- Paul Holmes MP
- Kieran Mullan MP
- Crispin Blunt
- Peter Gibson
- Nigel Evans
- Mike Freer
- Iain Stewart
- Gary Sambrook
- William Wragg
- Rt Hon. David Mundell MP
- Elliot Colburn
- Mark Fletcher
- Daniel Kawczynski
- Paul Holmes

LGBT+ Conservatives patrons in the House of Lords:

- Lord Black of Brentwood
- Baroness Davidson of Lundin Links
- Lord Duncan of Springbank
- Lord Hayward
- Lord Barker of Battle
- Lord Herbert of South Downs

LGBT+ Conservatives patrons in Holyrood:

- Annie Wells MSP
- Jamie Green MSP

LGBT+ Conservatives patrons in the London Assembly:

- Andrew Boff AM
- Emma Best AM
- Nick Rodgers AM

== Awards ==
The LGBT+ Conservatives started giving out awards to UK parliamentarians and LGBT+ Conservatives' Executive and council members in 2022.

Prospective candidates for an award are shortlisted by the LGBT+ Conservatives' Executive. Once shortlisted, the members of the LGBT+ Conservatives vote for their preferred winner.

Traditionally, the Awards are announced at the Pride Reception, which the LGBT+ Conservatives has held jointly with the UK LGBT charity Stonewall at Conservative Party Conference.

Year	Patron of the Year	Ally of the Year	Council Member of the Year
2022	Baroness Davidson of Lundin Links	Penny Mordaunt MP	Luke Robert Black
2023	Stuart Andrew MP	Penny Mordaunt MP	Albie Amankona
2024	To be confirmed	To be confirmed	To be confirmed

== See also ==
- List of organisations associated with the British Conservative Party
- List of LGBT-related organisations
- LGBT rights in the United Kingdom
