= 2008 Southampton City Council election =

2008 UK local government election

Map of the results of the 2008 Southampton council election. Conservatives in blue and Labour in red.

The 2008 Southampton Council election took place on 1 May 2008 to elect members of Southampton Unitary Council in Hampshire, England. One third of the council was up for election and the Conservative Party gained overall control of the council from no overall control.

After the election, the composition of the council was:

- Conservative 26
- Labour 14
- Liberal Democrat 8

== Background ==
After the 2007 election the Conservative Party took control as a minority administration after one Liberal Democrat councillor, Norah Goss, broke with her party to support the Conservatives. However, at the February 2008 budget meeting, the Labour and Liberal Democrats joined together to take control from the Conservatives.

== Election results ==
The results saw the Conservative Party win a majority on the council for the first time since 1984. The Conservatives gained 8 seats, 4 from Labour, 3 from the Liberal Democrats and 1 from an independent. Two 18-year-olds were among the Conservative winners, David Fuller taking Bitterne by 460 votes and Matthew Jones gaining Peartree by over 500 votes. Meanwhile, both the Labour leader of the council, June Bridle, in Sholing and the Liberal Democrat group leader, Adrian Vinson, in Portswood were among those who lost seats. The Conservative gains meant that they won 15 of the 17 seats contested to take a 4-seat majority with 26 seats, compared to 14 seats for Labour and 8 for the Liberal Democrats. Overall turnout in the election was 29.7%, down on the 30.3% in 2007 and varying between a low of 16.1% in Bargate and a high of 36.9% in Shirley.

The Conservative election success was put down to a combination of a rejection of the pact between the Labour and Liberal Democrat parties, anger at plans to charge people for parking outside their homes and the national issue of the abolition of the 10p rate of income tax. The results were also seen as indications for the next general election, with projections that the Conservatives could gain Southampton Test and Southampton Itchen constituencies from Labour on swings of 15.9% and 18.9% respectively, based on the local election results.

Following the election, Alec Samuels became the new Conservative leader of the council, Richard Williams became leader of the Labour group and Jill Baston took charge of the Liberal Democrat group.

Southampton local election result 2008
Party	Seats	Gains	Losses	Net gain/loss	Seats %	Votes %	Votes	+/−
Conservative	15	8	0	+8	88.2	47.4	25,374	+9.9
Labour	2	0	4	-4	11.8	26.3	14,090	-4.2
Liberal Democrats	0	0	3	-3	0.0	18.6	9,974	-5.2
Green	0	0	0	0	0.0	4.5	2,394	-0.6
Independent	0	0	1	-1	0.0	1.5	816	+1.5
UKIP	0	0	0	0	0.0	1.0	551	-1.2
Southampton First	0	0	0	0	0.0	0.5	292	-0.1

== Ward results ==
=== Bargate ===
Bargate
Party	Candidate	Votes	%	±%
Conservative	Amy Whiskerd	912	41.5	+8.9
Labour	John Noon	776	35.3	−7.9
Liberal Democrats	Michelle Milton	250	11.4	−3.3
Green	John Spottiswoode	156	7.1	−2.3
Independent	Frances Murphy	103	4.7	+4.7
Majority		136	6.2	
Turnout		2,197	16.1	+0.1
Conservative gain from Labour		Swing		

=== Bassett ===
Bassett
Party	Candidate	Votes	%	±%
Conservative	John Hannides	2,103	55.0	+7.6
Liberal Democrats	Jonathan Walsh	1,207	31.6	−4.6
Labour	Lee Whitbread	348	9.1	−1.8
UKIP	Mike Cottrell	166	4.3	−1.2
Majority		896	23.4	+12.2
Turnout		3,824	34.0	−1.9
Conservative hold		Swing		

=== Bevois ===
Bevois
Party	Candidate	Votes	%	±%
Labour	Stephen Barnes-Andrews	965	43.3	−7.5
Conservative	Chris Rowland	753	33.8	+12.5
Green	Martin Hall	269	12.1	+2.3
Liberal Democrats	Simon Mockler	244	10.9	−2.0
Majority		212	9.5	−20.0
Turnout		2,231	20.8	−0.1
Labour hold		Swing		

=== Bitterne ===
Bitterne
Party	Candidate	Votes	%	±%
Conservative	David Fuller	1,494	51.3	+17.5
Labour	Paul Jenks	1,034	35.5	−12.8
Liberal Democrats	Robert Naish	387	13.3	−4.6
Majority		460	15.8	
Turnout		2,915	29.4	+0.8
Conservative gain from Labour		Swing		

=== Bitterne Park ===
Bitterne Park
Party	Candidate	Votes	%	±%
Conservative	Ivan White	1,933	57.7	+8.4
Liberal Democrats	Robbie Robinson	757	22.6	+1.2
Labour	Shaun Brady	660	19.7	−2.1
Majority		1,176	35.1	+7.5
Turnout		3,350	32.6	+0.0
Conservative hold		Swing		

=== Coxford ===
Coxford
Party	Candidate	Votes	%	±%
Conservative	Ben Walker	1,018	31.7	+9.3
Labour	Keith Morrell	986	30.7	−4.2
Liberal Democrats	Sue Jackson	918	28.6	−4.7
UKIP	Leslie Obee	287	8.9	+3.1
Majority		32	1.0	
Turnout		3,209	31.3	−2.6
Conservative gain from Liberal Democrats		Swing		

=== Freemantle ===
Freemantle
Party	Candidate	Votes	%	±%
Conservative	Michael Ball	1,580	53.6	+7.8
Labour	David Sturrum	671	22.8	−4.5
Liberal Democrats	Paul Abbott	405	13.7	+0.1
Green	Darren Pickering	293	9.9	−3.3
Majority		909	30.8	+12.2
Turnout		2,949	27.5	−0.7
Conservative hold		Swing		

=== Harefield ===
Harefield (2)
Party	Candidate	Votes	%	±%
Conservative	Edward Daunt	2,051		
Conservative	Daniel FitzHenry	1,918		
Labour	Mike Brainsby	888		
Labour	Funda Pepperell	778		
Liberal Democrats	Diana Wills	380		
Liberal Democrats	Sharon Mintoff	351		
Green	Andy Shaw	324		
Turnout		6,690	34.3	
Conservative hold		Swing		
Conservative hold		Swing		

=== Millbrook ===
Millbrook
Party	Candidate	Votes	%	±%
Conservative	Andy Wells	1,527	47.9	
Liberal Democrats	Ken Darke	700	22.0	
Labour	Richard Green	675	21.2	
Green	Victoria Payne	287	9.0	
Majority		827	25.9	
Turnout		3,189	29.3	−3.5
Conservative hold		Swing		

=== Peartree ===
Peartree
Party	Candidate	Votes	%	±%
Conservative	Matthew Jones	1,334	38.6	+8.7
Liberal Democrats	Barbara Cove	832	24.1	−20.2
Labour	Andy Wilson	580	16.8	−9.0
Independent	Norah Goss	508	14.7	+14.7
Independent	Robert Goldie	205	5.9	+5.9
Majority		502	14.5	
Turnout		3,459	34.0	+2.1
Conservative gain from Independent		Swing		

=== Portswood ===
Portswood
Party	Candidate	Votes	%	±%
Conservative	Vincenzo Capozzoli	1,273	37.6	+11.3
Liberal Democrats	Adrian Vinson	1,144	33.8	+0.5
Labour	Samuel Goold	472	14.0	−3.5
Green	Christopher Bluemel	350	10.3	−0.7
Southampton First	Peter Knight	143	4.2	−5.2
Majority		129	3.8	
Turnout		3,382	31.7	+2.1
Conservative gain from Liberal Democrats		Swing		

=== Redbridge ===
Redbridge
Party	Candidate	Votes	%	±%
Conservative	Paul Holmes	1,251	43.5	+16.6
Labour	Dennis Harryman	1,199	41.7	−1.3
Liberal Democrats	Juliet Williams	424	14.8	−15.3
Majority		52	1.8	
Turnout		2,874	27.7	−1.2
Conservative gain from Labour		Swing		

=== Shirley ===
Shirley
Party	Candidate	Votes	%	±%
Conservative	Terry Matthews	1,922	51.6	+6.7
Labour	Graham Giles	1,137	30.5	−1.5
Green	Paul Garratt	336	9.0	+0.7
Liberal Democrats	Keith Reed	331	8.9	−1.2
Majority		785	21.1	+8.2
Turnout		3,726	36.1	−2.1
Conservative hold		Swing		

=== Sholing ===
Sholing
Party	Candidate	Votes	%	±%
Conservative	Neil Fitzgerald	2,022	54.1	+9.0
Labour	June Bridle	1,339	35.9	−0.3
Liberal Democrats	James Read	374	10.0	+0.2
Majority		683	18.3	+9.4
Turnout		3,735	35.3	−2.0
Conservative gain from Labour		Swing		

=== Swaythling ===
Swaythling
Party	Candidate	Votes	%	±%
Conservative	Edward Osmond	1,140	41.6	−3.6
Liberal Democrats	Ann Milton	897	32.7	+6.2
Labour	Cameron Miller	332	12.1	−6.7
Southampton First	Alan Kebbell	149	5.4	+5.4
Green	Joe Cox	124	4.5	−5.0
UKIP	Rod Caws	98	3.6	+3.6
Majority		243	8.9	−9.9
Turnout		2,740	28.9	+0.5
Conservative gain from Liberal Democrats		Swing		

=== Woolston ===
Woolston
Party	Candidate	Votes	%	±%
Labour	Richard Williams	1,250	41.4	−5.8
Conservative	John Whiskerd	1,143	37.8	+8.3
Liberal Democrats	Margaret O'Neill	373	12.3	−11.1
Green	Colin Reader	255	8.4	+8.4
Majority		107	3.5	−14.2
Turnout		3,021	30.5	+2.0
Labour hold		Swing		

Preceded by 2007 Southampton Council election	Southampton local elections	Succeeded by 2010 Southampton Council election
