= 2010 Southampton City Council election =

2010 UK local government election

← 2008	6 May 2010	2011 →
	First party	Second party	Third party
Party	Conservative	Labour	Liberal Democrats
Seats won	28	15	5
Seat change	▲2	▲1	▼3
Popular vote	34,602	33,418	28,769
Percentage	34.2%	33.0%	28.4%
- Map showing the election results

The 2010 Southampton Council election took place on 6 May 2010 to elect members of Southampton Unitary Council in Hampshire, England. One third of the council was up for election and the Conservative Party stayed in overall control of the council.

== Background ==
Before the election the Conservatives ran the council with 26 seats, compared to 14 for Labour and 8 for the Liberal Democrats. With the Conservatives defending just 4 of the 16 seats being contested they were almost certain to retain control of the council. Meanwhile, Liberal Democrat group leader Jill Baston was among those who stood down at the election, with former Liberal Democrat leader of the council Adrian Vinson attempting to return to the council in the seat she was leaving.

== Election result ==
The results saw the Conservatives keep a majority on the council after gaining 2 seats to hold 28 of the 48 seats. Labour made a net gain of the 1 seat to move to 15 seats, while the Liberal Democrats lost 3 to be reduced to 5 councillors. With the election taking place at the same time as the 2010 general election overall turnout was higher than usual at 59%.

Both unsuccessful Conservative candidates for Southampton Itchen and Southampton Test in the 2010 general election were among those re-elected to the council. The former Liberal Democrat leader of the council Adrian Vinson, regained a seat on the council in Portswood, 2 years after being voted off the council, while Gerry Drake held Peartree for the Liberal Democrats by 30 votes after 3 recounts. However Labour candidates Keith Morrell and David Furnell gained the seats of Coxford and Millbrook respectively from the Liberal Democrats.

Southampton local election result 2010
Party	Seats	Gains	Losses	Net gain/loss	Seats %	Votes %	Votes	+/−
Labour	7	2	1	+1	43.8	33.0	33,418	+6.7%
Conservative	6	2	0	+2	37.5	34.2	34,602	-13.2%
Liberal Democrats	3	0	3	-3	18.8	28.4	28,769	+9.8%
Green	0	0	0	0	0	2.8	2,857	-1.7%
UKIP	0	0	0	0	0	1.1	1,083	+0.1%
Independent	0	0	0	0	0	0.4	422	-1.1%

== Ward results ==
=== Bargate ===
Bargate
Party	Candidate	Votes	%	±%
Labour	Sarah Bogle	2,055	33.3	−2.0
Liberal Democrats	Kenneth Darke	1,900	30.8	+19.4
Conservative	James Baillie	1,799	29.1	−12.4
Green	John Spottiswoode	420	6.8	−0.3
Majority		155	2.5	
Turnout		6,174	42.8	+26.7
Labour hold		Swing		

=== Bassett ===
Bassett
Party	Candidate	Votes	%	±%
Conservative	Beryl Harris	2,945	42.0	−13.0
Liberal Democrats	Paul Clarke	2,691	38.3	+6.7
Labour	Nicholas Mayer	1,028	14.6	+5.5
Green	Jonathan Bean	356	5.1	+5.1
Majority		254	3.6	−19.8
Turnout		7,020	63.0	+29.0
Conservative gain from Liberal Democrats		Swing		

=== Bevois ===
Bevois
Party	Candidate	Votes	%	±%
Labour	Derek Burke	2,369	42.8	−0.5
Liberal Democrats	James Read	1,413	25.5	+14.6
Conservative	Spandita Woodman	1,257	22.7	−11.1
Green	Christopher Bluemel	357	6.4	−5.7
Independent	Syed Shah	82	1.5	+1.5
Independent	Khalid Farooq	61	1.1	+1.1
Majority		956	17.3	+7.8
Turnout		5,539	50.2	+29.4
Labour hold		Swing		

=== Bitterne ===
Bitterne
Party	Candidate	Votes	%	±%
Labour	Simon Letts	2,464	44.3	+8.8
Conservative	Alexander Williams	1,922	34.6	−16.7
Liberal Democrats	Robert Naish	1,171	21.1	+7.8
Majority		542	9.7	
Turnout		5,557	56.1	+25.7
Labour hold		Swing		

=== Bitterne Park ===
Bitterne Park
Party	Candidate	Votes	%	±%
Conservative	Philip Williams	2,612	38.2	−19.5
Liberal Democrats	Arnold Robinson	2,085	30.5	+7.9
Labour	Craig Philbrick	1,797	26.3	+6.6
Green	Jemma Savillewood	348	5.1	+5.1
Majority		527	7.7	−27.4
Turnout		6,842	64.7	+32.1
Conservative hold		Swing		

=== Coxford ===
Coxford
Party	Candidate	Votes	%	±%
Labour	Keith Morrell	2,379	38.0	+7.3
Liberal Democrats	Peter Galton	1,826	29.2	+0.6
Conservative	Russell Baker	1,769	28.3	−3.4
Independent	Richard McQuillan	279	4.5	+4.5
Majority		553	8.8	
Turnout		6,253	60.5	+29.2
Labour gain from Liberal Democrats		Swing		

=== Freemantle ===
Freemantle
Party	Candidate	Votes	%	±%
Conservative	Jeremy Moulton	2,490	37.8	−15.8
Labour	Andrew Pope	2,111	32.1	+9.3
Liberal Democrats	Paul Abbott	1,985	30.1	+16.4
Majority		379	5.8	−25.0
Turnout		6,586	58.2	+30.7
Conservative hold		Swing		

=== Harefield ===
Harefield
Party	Candidate	Votes	%	±%
Conservative	Royston Smith	2,914	45.0	
Labour	Lee Whitbread	2,246	34.7	
Liberal Democrats	Simon Mockler	1,320	20.4	
Majority		668	10.3	
Turnout		6,480	61.2	+26.9
Conservative hold		Swing		

=== Millbrook ===
Millbrook
Party	Candidate	Votes	%	±%
Labour	David Furnell	2,374	36.5	+15.3
Conservative	Christopher Rowland	2,253	34.7	−13.2
Liberal Democrats	Stephen Plumridge	1,874	28.8	+6.8
Majority		121	1.8	
Turnout		6,501	59.4	+30.1
Labour gain from Liberal Democrats		Swing		

=== Peartree ===
Peartree
Party	Candidate	Votes	%	±%
Liberal Democrats	Gerry Drake	2,165	32.8	+8.7
Conservative	Casey Baldwin	2,135	32.4	−6.2
Labour	Neil Kelly	1,856	28.2	+11.4
UKIP	Robert Geddes	435	6.6	+6.6
Majority		30	0.4	
Turnout		6,591	63.2	+29.2
Liberal Democrats hold		Swing		

=== Portswood ===
Portswood
Party	Candidate	Votes	%	±%
Liberal Democrats	Adrian Vinson	2,772	39.8	+6.0
Conservative	Matthew Claisse	2,165	31.1	−6.5
Labour	Philip Webb	1,546	22.2	+8.2
Green	Joseph Cox	480	6.9	−3.4
Majority		607	8.7	
Turnout		6,963	63.3	+31.6
Liberal Democrats hold		Swing		

=== Redbridge ===
Redbridge
Party	Candidate	Votes	%	±%
Labour	Catherine McEwing	2,731	47.0	+5.3
Conservative	Christopher Webb	1,833	31.6	−11.9
Liberal Democrats	Simon Stokes	1,245	21.4	+6.6
Majority		898	15.4	
Turnout		5,809	55.3	+27.6
Labour hold		Swing		

=== Shirley ===
Shirley
Party	Candidate	Votes	%	±%
Conservative	Raymond Mead	2,461	36.2	−15.4
Labour	Carol Dey	2,372	34.9	+4.4
Liberal Democrats	Keith Reed	1,584	23.3	+!4.4
UKIP	Pearline Hingston	385	5.7	+5.7
Majority		89	1.3	−19.8
Turnout		6,802	64.9	+18.8
Conservative hold		Swing		

=== Sholing ===
Sholing
Party	Candidate	Votes	%	±%
Conservative	Anthony Kolker	2,669	38.6	−15.5
Labour	Susan Blatchford	2,557	37.0	+1.1
Liberal Democrats	Sharon Mintoff	1,422	20.5	+10.5
Green	Susan Robson	272	3.9	+3.9
Majority		112	1.6	−16.7
Turnout		6,920	64.3	+29.0
Conservative gain from Labour		Swing		

=== Swaythling ===
Swaythling
Party	Candidate	Votes	%	±%
Liberal Democrats	Maureen Turner	2,035	38.0	+5.3
Conservative	Valerie Laurent	1,623	30.3	−11.3
Labour	Daniel Jeffery	1,086	20.3	+8.2
Green	Angela Cotton	354	6.6	+2.1
UKIP	Alan Kebbell	263	4.9	+1.3
Majority		412	7.7	
Turnout		5,361	55.8	+26.9
Liberal Democrats hold		Swing		

=== Woolston ===
Woolston
Party	Candidate	Votes	%	±%
Labour	Carol Cunio	2,447	42.5	+1.1
Conservative	Michael Denness	1,755	30.5	−7.3
Liberal Democrats	Jane Foster	1,281	22.3	+10.0
Green	Colin Reader	270	4.7	−3.7
Majority		692	12.0	+8.5
Turnout		5,753	57.9	+27.4
Labour hold		Swing		

Preceded by 2008 Southampton Council election	Southampton local elections	Succeeded by 2011 Southampton Council election
