= GayLib =

LGBT liberal political faction in France

- President: Catherine Michaud
- Founded: 2002
- Ideology: Social liberalism Liberalism (French); Historical, now factions: LGBTQ conservatism
- Position: Centre; Historical, now factions: Centre-right
- Mother party: Radical Party (since 2018); Union of Democrats and Independents (2013–2018); Union for a Popular Movement (2002–2013)
- Website: gaylib.org

GayLib is an LGBTI liberal association affiliated with the Radical Party. It was formerly affiliated with the French political party Union for a Popular Movement from its inception in 2002 until 2013, and with the Union of Democrats and Independents from 2013 to 2018.

== History ==
The creation of GayLib was supported by Jean-Pierre Raffarin, Philippe Douste-Blazy, Alain Juppé, and François Baroin. In 2002, its members participated in the pride parade in Paris for the first time.

From 2007, they faced criticism from groups like the Pink Panthers, ACT UP and AIDES because of the UMP's repudiation of same-sex marriage. However, GayLib argued that the UMP contributed to strengthening hate-crime laws, improving the PACS, establishing the HALDE, and advocating against the criminalization in foreign policy through Rama Yade's appeal to the United Nations.

In January 2013, it rescinded its affiliation with the UMP because of the party's opposition to same-sex marriage. It later affiliated with the Union of Democrats and Independents (UDI), whose president, Jean-Louis Borloo, endorsed same-sex marriage.

In 2018, GayLib severed its ties with UDI and joined the Radical Movement (MR). Following the dissolution of MR, GayLib became the official LGBTI wing of the revived Radical Party (PR).

== See also ==
- Homosexualités et Socialisme, the Socialist Party-affiliated equivalent
