= Mary Cheney =

American politician (born 1969)

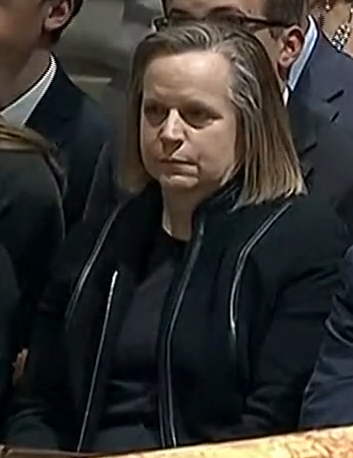
- Cheney in 2025
- Born: Mary Claire Cheney; March 14, 1969 (age 57); Madison, Wisconsin, U.S.
- Education: Colorado College (BA); University of Denver (MBA)
- Political party: Republican
- Spouse: Heather Poe (m. 2012)
- Children: 2
- Parents: Dick Cheney (father); Lynne Cheney (mother)
- Relatives: Liz Cheney (sister)

Mary Claire Cheney (/ˈtʃeɪni/; born March 14, 1969) is an American activist, businesswoman, and political figure. She is the youngest of two daughters of Dick Cheney, the 46th vice president of the United States and 17th United States secretary of defense, and Lynne Cheney. She is involved with a number of political action committees. She married her wife, Heather Poe, in 2012, and was a signatory to an amicus curiae brief submitted to the U.S. Supreme Court in support of same-sex marriage during the Hollingsworth v. Perry case in 2013.

== Early life and education ==
Cheney was born in Madison, Wisconsin. She attended McLean High School in McLean, Virginia, graduating in the class of 1987. Following that, she attended Colorado College, her mother and sister's alma mater, in Colorado Springs, Colorado, and graduated in 1991. She earned a graduate business degree from the University of Denver in 2002.

== Career ==
In 1993, she became one of the first employees of the Colorado Rockies baseball team, working in promotions when the team began playing in Denver; thereafter, she was a public relations manager for the Coors Brewing Company, and worked as a gay outreach coordinator, helping to end a national Coors strike and boycott by the gay community.

She had been one of her father's top campaign aides and closest confidantes. In July 2003, she became the Director of Vice Presidential Operations for the Bush re-election campaign in 2004.

Cheney was vice president of standards and practices at AOL, leaving in 2007.

== Personal life ==
Mary Cheney has been with her wife, Heather Poe, since 1992.

Cheney has voiced support for same-sex marriage, and has been credited with encouraging her father's approval of it, which he publicly supported once leaving the vice presidency.

In December 2006, Mary Cheney was reported to be pregnant. She and Poe were said to be "ecstatic" about the baby. "The vice president and Mrs. Cheney are looking forward with eager anticipation to the arrival of their sixth grandchild," spokesperson Lea Anne McBride said on December 5.

On January 31, 2007, in a forum by Glamour Magazine at Barnard College of Columbia University, Mary Cheney stated that: "This is a baby... This is a blessing from God. It is not a political statement. It is not a prop to be used in a debate by people on either side of an issue. It is my child." She gave birth to her first child, Samuel, in May 2007.

Cynthia Leive, editor in chief of Glamour, asked Cheney if she had anything to say to critics like James Dobson, who has denounced same-sex marriage and LGBT people raising children. Cheney accused Dobson of distorting the research he cited, and added: "Every piece of remotely responsible research that has been done in the last 20 years has shown there is no difference between children raised by same-sex parents and children raised by opposite-sex parents; what matters is being raised in a stable, loving environment." She also said that Dobson was entitled to his opinion, "but he's not someone whose endorsement I have ever drastically sought".

Cheney gave birth to her second child, Sarah, on November 18, 2009. Cheney and Poe were married on June 22, 2012, in Washington, D.C. The family resides in Great Falls, Virginia.

=== Dispute with Liz Cheney ===
In 2013, Mary Cheney's older sister Liz, who was running for a Senate seat in Wyoming, stated during an interview on Fox News Sunday that she did not support same-sex marriage. In response, Mary Cheney denounced her sister's remarks, writing in a Facebook post, "Either you think all families should be treated equally or you don't. Liz's position is to treat my family as second-class citizens." Mary subsequently said she would not support her sister's candidacy and would boycott visiting the rest of the Cheney family for Christmas that year. Her wife Heather Poe wrote a Facebook post stating, "Liz has been a guest in our home, has spent time and shared holidays with our children, and when Mary and I got married in 2012 – she didn't hesitate to tell us how happy she was for us. To have her now say she doesn't support our right to marry is offensive to say the least."

In 2015, when asked if she and her sister had mended their relationship, Mary Cheney said, "I don't have to answer that." However, in 2021, Liz told 60 Minutes they had reconciled after she admitted to Mary that she had been wrong in her views on same-sex marriage.

== Politics ==
=== 2000 presidential campaign ===
In 2000, the Bush-Cheney presidential campaign freely discussed Liz Cheney's marriage and children, but were silent about Mary Cheney's private life. Nevertheless, Cheney's sexual orientation was publicly known, and some considered her presence during the campaign as bolstering, providing the Republican ticket with a "compassionate conservative" image. During an interview with Lynne Cheney, Cokie Roberts brought up the topic of Mary Cheney's having declared herself gay. Lynne Cheney responded by stating that "Mary has never declared such a thing", and criticized Roberts and the media for their interest in the story.

In 2002, Mary Cheney joined the Republican gay-straight alliance Republican Unity Coalition and said that sexual orientation should be "a non-issue" for the Republican Party. Cheney resigned from the RUC's board and in July 2003 became the director of vice presidential operations for the Bush-Cheney 2004 re-election campaign.

=== Federal Marriage Amendment ===
In 2004, public attention focused again on Cheney's sexuality, when the Bush administration supported the Federal Marriage Amendment, a proposed amendment to the United States Constitution that would limit marriage to heterosexual couples and ban civil unions and domestic partnership benefits. Cheney did not publicly express her opinion of the amendment at the time. In her 2006 autobiography, Now It's My Turn, Cheney stated her opposition to the amendment. However, at the time, she remained silent to support Bush's re-election bid. In August 2004, Dick Cheney reiterated the position he took in the 2000 presidential campaign: that the issue should be handled by individual state governments. He added, though, that President Bush determined his administration's policies, and his policy supported the Federal Marriage Amendment.

=== 2004 presidential re-election campaign ===
During the 2004 Bush-Cheney presidential re-election campaign, Cheney served as her father's director of vice presidential operations, which led to discussion of her sexual orientation making its way into the media again.

The 2004 presidential election debates included mentions of the same-sex marriage debate and referred, initially indirectly, to Cheney. Both Democratic presidential candidate John Kerry and vice-presidential candidate John Edwards mentioned and praised Cheney's openness with regard to her sexual orientation when questioned regarding LGBT issues.

During the Cheney-Edwards vice-presidential debate, moderator Gwen Ifill directed a question to the Vice President in which his daughter was indirectly mentioned:

I want to read something you said four years ago at this very setting: 'Freedom means freedom for everybody.' You said it again recently when you were asked about legalizing same-sex unions. And you used your family's experience as a context for your remarks. Can you describe then your administration's support for a constitutional ban on same-sex unions?

— Gwen Ifill

Cheney reiterated his position of four years prior, stating the issue should be left to the states but that he supports the Bush administration. He did not mention his family nor his daughter in his immediate response to the question. In his response, Edwards said:

I think the vice president and his wife love their daughter. I think they love her very much. And you can't have anything but respect for the fact that they're willing to talk about the fact that they have a gay daughter, the fact that they embrace her. It's a wonderful thing. And there are millions of parents like that who love their children, who want their children to be happy.

— John Edwards

Although he was given 90 seconds to respond to Edwards' comments, Cheney responded succinctly, "Well, Gwen, let me simply thank the senator for the kind words he said about my family and our daughter. I appreciate that very much." Ifill followed up: "That's it?" Cheney replied, "That's it", effectively ending the discussion of his daughter's sexual orientation. At the end of the debate, Mary Cheney appeared on the podium with her partner and the rest of the family.

During the third and final Bush-Kerry presidential debate, moderator Bob Schieffer asked, "Do you believe homosexuality is a choice?" to which Kerry replied, "If you were to talk to Dick Cheney's daughter, who is a lesbian, she would tell you that she's being who she was, she's being who she was born as." In response, Dick Cheney stated, "You saw a man who will say and do anything in order to get elected. And I am not just speaking as a father here, though I am a pretty angry father."

=== 2010 political work ===
In 2010, Mary Cheney became involved in a network of politically active nonprofit organizations. The network is illustrated in this reference: According to tax forms filed with the Internal Revenue Service, Cheney is a member of the BKM Strategies consulting firm. In 2010, Cheney and two other Republican consultants, Barry Bennett and Kara Ahern, started two nonprofits in the office of BKM Strategies: The Alliance for Freedom and the Alliance for America's Future. In the same year, Cheney and Kara Ahern established a Super PAC, Partnership for America's Future, which is not currently active.

=== 2014 political work ===
In 2014, Cheney's consulting firm BKM Strategies was apparently responsible for a writing campaign in support of the controversial Keystone XL pipeline. Of the nearly 125,000 comments filed with the U.S. State Department, at least 98,000 contained similar pro-pipeline language and came from individuals listing BKM Strategies as the originating organization, according to the nonprofit Sunlight Foundation.

== 2006 autobiography ==
Mary Cheney left the public spotlight after the 2004 election until May 4, 2006, when she was interviewed by Diane Sawyer for ABC News' Primetime program to promote her autobiography, Now It's My Turn. In the book, published in 2006, Cheney discusses how she came out to her parents, recounting her father's initial reaction: "You know, look, you're my daughter and I love you and I just want you to be happy." She also discusses her relationship with her partner, Heather Poe.

Gay rights advocates criticized her for waiting until after the 2004 election to voice her disapproval of the Bush administration's positions on gay rights. During another appearance by Cheney on May 19, 2006, on the Late Show with David Letterman, David Letterman brought up some of the issues raised by the gay community. He asked Cheney why she had waited two years after the 2004 election to speak publicly about gay marriage and LGBT rights, and asked whether she had any input with the Bush administration regarding gay issues. Cheney responded that she did not, and that it had not been her job to do so.

== Vice portrayal ==
Actress Alison Pill portrayed Mary Cheney in the 2018 film Vice, a biographical film about Dick Cheney in which Mary's sexuality is cited as her father's reason for not running for president, because he is portrayed as wanting to protect her from attacks by his opponents in the Republican primaries. Neither Dick nor Mary Cheney provided comments on whether this or other depictions regarding them in the film were accurate.
