= Republican Unity Coalition =

The Republican Unity Coalition (RUC) was an organization of the United States Republican Party created as an outgrowth of the George W. Bush campaign in the 2000 presidential election. Formed by Bush family friend Charles Francis, it described itself a "grasstops" organization with a Board of Advisors that included the late former President Gerald Ford, former U.S. Senator Alan K. Simpson of Wyoming, philanthropist and banker David Rockefeller, and Mary Cheney, daughter of the former Vice President, and former U.S. Senator John Danforth of Missouri.

It was a gay/straight alliance, that believed, according to its credo, the Cody Statement, that the Republican Party must become a big tent and reach out to non-traditional Republicans. Specifically, it sought to include gay and lesbian Americans who shared the basic Republican emphasis on personal liberty, self-responsibility and a strong national defense. The RUC submitted an amicus brief to the Supreme Court in the case of Lawrence v. Texas, signed by former Senator Simpson and written by University of Minnesota law school professor Dale Carpenter and Eric Jaffe, former clerk to Justice Clarence Thomas.

Former Senator Simpson said he is "proud to have helped arrange for former President Gerald Ford during Ford's retirement years, to become the first U.S. President to become a member of a gay rights organization." In a private letter to Francis, Ford wrote he supported the RUC amicus brief and "gay equality before the law".

However, after Bush called for a Federal Marriage Amendment to ban same-sex marriage in 2003 and supported the "Marriage Protection Act" covering the federal courts, the organization's activity and support quickly collapsed. The founding members felt Bush had "squandered a precious chance to broaden the GOP". While the organization has not formally declared itself as defunct, its political action committee, Unity PAC, was relieved of reporting obligations by the Federal Elections Commission in a July 25, 2006 notice, due to several years of inactivity. As of January 2008, its website has been shut down.

== See also ==
- Log Cabin Republicans
