= LGBTQ conservatism in the United States =

Movement within conservatism

Map of United States Republican Party state and county or equivalent chapter platforms on the issue of state sanctioned same-sex marriage (as of July 3, 2018): Platform opposes state sanctioned same-sex marriage. Platform supports marriage privatization of state sanctioned same-sex marriage. Platform has no position on state sanctioned same-sex marriage. Platform supports state sanctioned same-sex marriage.

In the United States, conservative social and political ideologies exist within the LGBTQ+ community. LGBTQ+ conservatism is generally more moderate on social issues than social conservatism, instead emphasizing values associated with fiscal conservatism, libertarian conservatism, and neoconservatism.

== History ==
=== Pre-Stonewall Era ===
Following World War II, fears of Communist infiltration into American national security institutions combined with pervasive homophobia led both conservative and liberal politicians to endorse policies to remove homosexuals from administrative and military positions within the American government. The same fears led to ideological divisions within early homophile movement organizations such as the Mattachine Society.

Mid-20th-century homophile activists, who pursued civil rights for gays and lesbians in the United States, were primarily informed by Marxist political ideology and had ties to the Communist Party. During an era dominated by anti-communist rhetoric, governmental, and social ideological policing, homophile movement organizations experienced pressure to deny communist affiliations. For the Mattachine Society, the divisions publicly erupted in 1953, when, at the organization's "Constitutional Convention," a majority of the delegates supported resolutions to disavow 'leftist' ideologies and elect new leaders without ties to the Communist Party.

Ideological divides were also reflected in homophile activism strategies. Often described as a dichotomy using the terms "assimilationist" and "liberationist," each designation refers to a style of activism used in achieving civil rights for sexual minorities. Assimilationist political strategies, otherwise defined as "insider" strategies, reflect a willingness to work within the structures and institutions of a particular political system and include activities such as lobbying or litigation. Liberationist strategies, otherwise defined as "outsider" strategies, reflect an unwillingness to engage in institutions that perpetuate systems of social or political oppression and include such activities as protests or demonstrations. Assimilationist strategies typically focus on elite targets – lawmakers, bureaucrats, judges, medical professionals, etc. – and therefore assume an individual or organization possesses the political, social, or economic capital necessary to engage these actors. This, and the focus on maintaining rather than disrupting existing political institutions, characterize assimilationist strategies as conservative. Even when homophile activists led by Frank Kameny, Barbara Gittings, and members of the East Coast Homophile Organizations adopted outsider strategies, such as pickets at the White House, according to the film Before Stonewall, participants were admonished to dress professionally and wear clothing complementary to traditional gender presentations. Such divides, contingent upon movement strategies or policy priorities, yet maintaining a focus on civil rights for sexual minorities, persist in contemporary LGBTQ+ political debates.

During this era, no major political party openly supported civil rights for gays and lesbians. Although Harry Hay, the founder of Mattachine had also established an organization with the tongue-in-cheek name "American Bachelors for Wallace" – auspiciously supporting Henry Wallace, the Progressive Party candidate for president in 1948 – it was not because the party openly supported gay and lesbian rights. The United States military had a long history of discriminatory treatment of gay and lesbian service members, and after becoming president, Dwight Eisenhower – elected as a Republican – signed Executive Order 10450 which had the effect of barring gays and lesbians from administrative service in the federal government. Even close associates of the president were not exempt from investigation. In the year before signing the executive order, Arthur H. Vandenberg, Jr. was named Eisenhower's Appointments Secretary. On January 13, 1953, however, a week before Eisenhower's inauguration, the White House announced that Vandenberg was taking a leave of absence for health reasons. In April, the same month Executive Order 10450 was signed, he resigned from his position blaming "an attack of stomach ulcers." He told the press that he was uncertain of his prognosis and "the uncertainty was unfair to the President." It was later revealed that J. Edgar Hoover, the director of the Federal Bureau of Investigation, had come into possession of information that implicated Vandenberg in the bureau's Sex Deviants Program.

Republican Senator Joseph McCarthy included suspected homosexuals in his investigation into communist infiltration of the American Government. An exchange between witnesses during a series of hearings in 1954 implied the presence of homosexuals in the U.S. military and referred to them using the derogatory terminology "pixie" and "fairy".

=== Post-Stonewall Era ===
While early homophile activists primarily pursued a politics of social assimilation, shared perceptions of social problems such as violence and physical assault, employment discrimination, police entrapment, and harassment of businesses catering to gay and lesbian clientele helped solidify a sexual minority identity throughout the 1950s and 1960s. By the end of the latter decade, LGBTQ+ politics was on the brink of a paradigm shift. The most widely-known example of the liberationist perspective in practice is exemplified by the Stonewall Riots. However, such tactics were deployed as early as the Cooper Do-nuts Riot in 1959 in response to police harassment of LGBTQ+ people. The events taking place in New York's West Village throughout late June 1969 had far-reaching repercussions and further exacerbated the divide between those holding assimilationist and liberationist ideologies.

The Gay Liberationist and Lesbian Feminist Movements took shape in the decade of the 1970s. Gender-based tensions fueled by sexism within male-dominated organizations associated with the Gay Liberation Movement led to the formation of a separate Lesbian Feminist Movement that advocated for both gender and sexual equality. Despite the liberationist protest and demonstrative tactics of Gay Liberation Movement organizations, they were dominated by a single-issue advocacy strategy which contributed to the identity politics approach of later 20th and 21st-century LGBTQ+ rights organizations.

In 1972, San Francisco's Gay Activists Alliance disbanded and formed the Gay Voter's League, a group that campaigned for the reelection of President Richard Nixon In October 1972, a representative of the Committee to Re-elect the President addressed gay voters on behalf of Richard M. Nixon's campaign in San Francisco. The event was organized by the Gay Voters League of San Francisco.

The first chapter of what would become the national Log Cabin Republicans (LCR) was formed in 1978 to fight California's Briggs Initiative, a ballot initiative that would have banned homosexuals from teaching in public schools. The chapter worked diligently and successfully convinced Governor Ronald Reagan to publicly oppose the measure.

During the 1984 United States House of Representatives Republican primary for Iowa's 4th congressional district, Rich Eychaner became the first openly gay candidate for federal office in the United States but lost the primary to Robert R. Lockard.

During the late 1980s and early 1990s, Michael A. Hess was a lawyer, deputy chief legal counsel and later chief legal counsel to the Republican National Committee. He was an important figure in the redistricting battles during the 1990 United States census and was admired for his integrity and pursuit of justice on this issue.

=== Presidency of Ronald Reagan ===
On the 1980 campaign trail, Reagan said of gay civil rights movements,

My criticism is that [the gay movement] isn't just asking for civil rights; it's asking for recognition and acceptance of an alternative lifestyle which I do not believe society can condone, nor can I.

No civil rights legislation for LGBTQ+ individuals was passed during Reagan's tenure. Additionally, Reagan has been criticized by some LGBTQ+ groups for allegedly ignoring (by failing to adequately address or fund) the growing AIDS epidemic, even as it took thousands of lives in the 1980s. Reagan's Surgeon General from 1982 to 1989, Dr. C. Everett Koop, claimed that his attempts to address the issue were shut out by the Reagan Administration. According to Koop, the prevailing view of the Reagan Administration was that the "transmission of AIDS was understood to be primarily in the homosexual population and in those who abused intravenous drugs" and therefore that people dying from AIDS were "only getting what they justly deserve".

On August 18, 1984, President Reagan issued a statement on the issue of same-sex unions that read,

Society has always regarded marital love as a sacred expression of the bond between a man and a woman. It is the means by which families are created and society itself is extended into the future. In the Judeo-Christian tradition, it is the means by which husband and wife participate with God in the creation of a new human life. It is for these reasons, among others, that our society has always sought to protect this unique relationship. In part the erosion of these values has given way to a celebration of forms of expression most reject. We will resist the efforts of some to obtain government endorsement of homosexuality.

Reagan made the comment in response to a questionnaire from the conservative publishers of the Presidential Biblical Scoreboard, a magazine-type compilation of past statements and voting records of national candidates.

In 1988, the Republican Party's nominee, then-Vice President George H. W. Bush, endorsed a plan to protect persons with AIDS from discrimination.

=== Presidency of George H. W. Bush ===
As President, George H. W. Bush signed legislation that extended gay rights. On April 23, 1990, Bush signed the Hate Crime Statistics Act, which requires the Attorney General to collect data on crimes committed because of the victim's race, religion, disability, sexual orientation, or ethnicity. It was the first federal statute to "recognize and name gay, lesbian and bisexual people".

On November 29, 1990, Bush signed the Immigration Act of 1990, which withdrew the phrase "sexual deviation" from the Immigration and Nationality Act (INA) so that it could no longer be used as a basis for barring entry of immigration to the U.S. for homosexuals.

In a television interview, Bush said if he found out his grandchild was gay, he would "love his child", but tell him homosexuality was not normal and discourage him from working for gay rights. In February 1992, the chairman of the Bush-Quayle campaign met with the National Gay and Lesbian Task Force. In May 1992, he appointed Anne-Imelda Radice to serve as the Acting Chairman of the National Endowment for the Arts. Losing ground in the 1992 Republican presidential primary to President Bush's far-right challenger, Pat Buchanan, the Bush campaign turned to the right, and President Bush publicly denounced same-sex marriage. The 1992 Log Cabin Republican convention was held in Spring, Texas, a Houston exurb. The main issue discussed was whether or not LCR would endorse the re-election of President George H. W. Bush. The group voted to deny that endorsement because Bush did not denounce anti-gay rhetoric at the 1992 Republican National Convention. Many in the gay community believed President Bush had not done enough on the issue of AIDS. Urvashi Vaid argues that Bush's anti-gay rhetoric "motivated conservative gay Democrats and loyal gay Republicans, who had helped defeat Dukakis in 1988, to throw their support behind Clinton".

In 1992, the City Council of the District of Columbia passed "The Health Benefits Expansion Act", which was signed into law by the Mayor of Washington, D.C. The bill, which established domestic partnerships in the District of Columbia, became law on June 11, 1992. Every year from 1992 to 2000, the Republican leadership of the U.S. Congress added a rider to the District of Columbia appropriations bill that prohibited the use of federal or local funds to implement the Health Care Benefits Expansion Act. On October 5, 1992, Bush signed H.R. 6056 into law, which included the Republican rider to the appropriations bill.

The 1992 Republican Party platform adopted support for continuing to exclude homosexuals from the military as a matter of good order and discipline. The 1992 Republican Party platform also opposed including sexual preference in anti-discrimination statutes.

=== Presidency of Bill Clinton ===
In 1994, George W. Bush, running for the governorship of Texas, pledged to veto any effort to repeal Texas' sodomy law, calling it "a symbolic gesture of traditional values".

In August 1995, the campaign of Republican presidential candidate, Bob Dole, returned the Log Cabin Republican's $1,000 campaign contribution. The campaign returned the contribution after openly lesbian columnist, Deb Price, of the Detroit News, asked about it after she saw it on a public report from the Federal Election Commission. The campaign sent a written statement to Price saying that Dole was in "100% disagreement with the agenda of the Log Cabin Republicans". The finance office of the campaign had solicited the contribution from LCR. At the event where it was given, Dole had personally spoken with LCR's then-executive director, Rich Tafel, about the group and about AIDS legislation it was promoting in the Senate. Weeks earlier, Dole agreed to co-sponsor the legislation after a meeting with Tafel at the campaign's headquarters. It resulted in a front-page story in The New York Times, penned by Richard L. Berke, then-chief political reporter for the daily.

As reporters, including Berke, were seeking confirmation of the story before it broke, Dole's finance chairman, John Moran, asked Tafel not to speak to the press and that Tafel's "steadfastness and statesmanship at this moment will be handsomely appreciated in the long run by the campaign". Tafel refused.

Pundits accused Dole of being a "flip-flopper and a hypocrite". Editorials ran in major newspapers, including the Washington Post, The New York Times, the Boston Globe, the Atlanta Journal-Constitution, and the Times of London, condemning Dole's action, joined by radio commentators Rush Limbaugh and Don Imus. Under the pressure, Dole admitted during an October 1995 press briefing on Capitol Hill, that he regretted the decision to return the check, and that his campaign was responsible for it without consulting him. "I think if they'd have consulted me, we wouldn't have done that, wouldn't have returned it," Dole said. Dole later told Washington Post editor and author Bob Woodward that the LCR episode was a "mistake" because the decision to return the check "gets into Bob Dole the person. It's not so much about Bob Dole the candidate. It's the person. Is he tolerant? Does he tolerate different views? Tolerate someone with a different lifestyle?" He added, "This is basic, this is what people ought to know about you. Are you going to just do this because it sounds good politically?"

LCR's leadership met with Dole's coalitions manager to discuss an endorsement after Dole's reversal. Among various items, Tafel demanded there be no gay bashing in the speeches from the podium of the 1996 Republican National Convention, nor any anti-homosexual signs on the convention floor. He also wanted to see a gay person address the convention and a public request from Dole's campaign for the LCR nod. On the closing night of the convention, Stephen Fong, then-president of the San Francisco chapter, spoke at the dais as part of a series of speeches from "mainstreet Americans", but was not publicly identified as gay. Nevertheless, his presence on the podium for the organization and the gay and lesbian community "was something that would have been unimaginable four years earlier", Tafel later wrote. Two days later, Dole spokesperson Christina Martin told a reporter that the campaign "welcomed the endorsement of the Log Cabin Republicans". LCR voted to endorse Dole for President, and then-Republican National Committee chairman Haley Barbour approved the use of the RNC's press briefing room for Tafel, LCR's convention delegates and officers of its national board to announce their decision.

Later in the campaign, Tafel met with Dole's chief aide Sheila Burke, and the remaining demands LCR made for their endorsement were met. In a statement released by LCR and confirmed to reporters by the campaign, Dole had pledged to maintain an executive order prohibiting discrimination based on sexual orientation in the federal workforce and full funding for AIDS programs.

In 1997, Governor Bush signed into law a bill adding "A license may not be issued for the marriage of persons of the same sex" into the Texas Family Code.

In a 1998 Texas Gubernatorial election political awareness test, Governor Bush answered no to the questions of whether the Texas government should include sexual orientation in Texas' anti-discrimination laws and whether he supports Texas recognizing same-sex marriage.

In 1999, the Byrd Jr. Hate Crimes Act, which would have increased punishment for criminals motivated by hatred of a victim's gender, religion, ethnic background or sexual orientation, was killed in committee by Texas Senate Republicans. Governor Bush was criticized for letting the hate crimes bill die in a Texas Senate committee. Bush spokesman Sullivan said the governor never took a position on the bill. According to Louvon Harris, sister of James Byrd, Bush's opposition to the bill reportedly revolved around the fact that it would cover gays and lesbians. She said that the governor's office "contacted the family and asked if we would consider taking sexual orientation out of the bill, and our answer was no, because the bill is for everybody. Everybody should be protected by the law." said Harris. In a 2000 presidential debate, Al Gore would attack Bush for allowing the bill to die in committee, with Bush responding that Texas already had a hate crimes statute, and nothing more was needed. George W. Bush also stated his opposition to the New Jersey Supreme Court ruling that said the Boy Scouts of America must accept gays in their organization. "I believe the Boy Scouts is a private organization and they should be able to set the standards that they choose to set," Bush said. Bush would also express his support for bans on gay foster parenting and adoption.

During the 2000 campaign, he did not endorse a single piece of gay rights legislation. In a 2000 Republican presidential debate, George W. Bush said he opposed same-sex marriage but supported state's rights when it came to the issue of same-sex marriage. During the campaign, he had refused to comment on Vermont's civil unions' law. On April 13, 2000, Governor Bush became the first presumptive GOP presidential nominee ever to meet publicly with gay Republicans in Austin, Texas. On August 4, 2000, Bush received the endorsement of the Log Cabin Republicans, the GOP's largest gay group, for president. He also received the endorsement of the newly formed Republican Unity Coalition. In a 2000 presidential debate with Al Gore, Bush stated he supported the Defense of Marriage Act and the "Don't ask, don't tell" policy. However, he stated that he opposed sodomy laws, a reversal of his position as governor of Texas.

The 2000 Republican Party platform included the statement: "We support the First Amendment right of freedom of association and stand united with private organizations, such as the Boy Scouts of America, and support their positions."

=== Presidency of George W. Bush ===
George W. Bush did not repeal President Clinton's Executive Order banning discrimination on the basis of sexual orientation in the federal civilian government, but Bush's critics felt as if he failed to enforce the executive order. He retained Clinton's Office of National AIDS Policy and was the first Republican president to appoint an openly gay man to serve in his administration: Scott Evertz as director of the Office of National AIDS Policy. Bush also became the second President, after President Clinton, to select openly gay appointees to his administration. Bush's nominee for ambassador to Romania, Michael E. Guest, became the second openly gay male U.S. Ambassador and the first to be confirmed by the Senate. He did not repeal any of the spousal benefits that Clinton had introduced for same-sex federal employees. He did not attempt to repeal Don't ask, don't tell, nor make an effort to change it.

In April 2002, White House officials held an unannounced briefing in April for the Log Cabin Republicans. On June 27, 2002, President Bush signed a bill allowing death benefits to be paid to domestic partners of firefighters and police officers who died in the line of duty, permanently extending a federal death benefit to same-sex couples for the first time.

In 2003, the United States Supreme Court ruled in Lawrence v. Texas that sodomy laws against consenting adults were unconstitutional. President Bush's press secretary Ari Fleischer refused to comment on the decision, noting only that the administration had not filed a brief in the case. In 2004, Bush said, "What they do in the privacy of their house, consenting adults should be able to do".

Previously, Bush said that he supported state's rights when it came to marriage; however, after Goodridge v. Department of Public Health, on February 24, 2004, Bush announced his support for an amendment to the US Constitution banning same-sex marriage. Due to his support of the Federal Marriage Amendment, the Log Cabin Republicans declined to endorse the reelection of George W. Bush in 2004. Bush's defense of the FMA led the group to vote 22 to 2 against an endorsement of his reelection. The Palm Beach County chapter in Florida did endorse him, resulting in the revocation of their charter. On September 22, 2004, the Abe Lincoln Black Republican Caucus (ALBRC), a group of young urban Black gay Republicans, voted in a special call meeting in Dallas, Texas to endorse President Bush for re-election. In an October presidential debate, Bush said he did not know whether homosexuality is a choice or not.

The 2004 Republican Party platform removed both parts of that language from the platform and stated that the party supports anti-discrimination legislation.

In 2007, Bush threatened to veto the Local Law Enforcement Hate Crimes Prevention Act of 2007, which would have included sexual orientation in hate crimes, and the Employment Nondiscrimination Act of 2007.

In September 2008, Log Cabin Republicans voted to endorse the John McCain–Sarah Palin ticket in the 2008 presidential election. LCR President Patrick Sammon said the most important reason for their support was McCain's opposition to the proposed constitutional amendment to ban same-sex marriage.

The 2008 Republican Party platform supported anti-discrimination statutes based on sex, race, age, religion, creed, disability, or national origin, but the platform was silent on sexual orientation and gender identity.

In December 2008, the Bush administration refused to support the U.N. declaration on sexual orientation and gender identity at the United Nations that condemns the use of violence, harassment, discrimination, exclusion, stigmatization, and prejudice based on sexual orientation and gender identity.

=== Presidency of Barack Obama ===
On April 15, 2009, Jimmy LaSalvia and Christopher R. Barron co-founded GOProud. Margaret Hoover, a member of the advisory council, added her opinion into the mix, "GOProud has helped force gays out of the conservative establishment—what I would call the 'conser-va-gentsia'—to take on these self-anointed leaders of social conservatism."

During a question and answer segment at the 2011 CPAC, Ann Coulter spoke about GOProud and the importance of a gay presence in the conservative movement. During the segment she said "So for now, I'd just like gays to be part of conservatives the way women are and blacks are without-without a special designation." and ended with "Gays are natural conservatives."

Support for the exclusion of homosexuals from military service would remain in the Republican Party platform until the 2012 Republican Party platform, which removed that language from it. The 2012 Republican Party platform also contained language opposing the Obama administration's attempts to impose its "cultural agenda", including a "homosexual rights agenda", in other countries by restricting foreign aid. However, Republicans themselves have also frequently advocated for restricting foreign aid as a means of asserting the national security and immigration interests of the United States. The 2012 Republican Party platform supported anti-discrimination statutes based on sex, race, age, religion, creed, disability, or national origin, but the platform was silent on sexual orientation and gender identity.

On June 20, 2012, GOProud endorsed Mitt Romney for president. On October 23, 2012, Log Cabin Republicans officially endorsed Mitt Romney for president. In a public statement, LCR said it supported Mitt Romney due to the "gravity of the economic and national security issues currently at stake". Moreover, LCR expressed its hope that Romney would reconsider his opposition to the Employment Non-Discrimination Act, but he did not.

In 2013, former President George H. W. Bush served as a witness at a same-sex wedding of Bonnie Clement and Helen Thorgalsen, who owns a general store together in Maine. In 2015, The Boston Globe reported that Bush "offered to perform the ceremony but had a scheduling conflict".

In June 2014, reports surfaced that the GOProud leadership had decided to dissolve the organization. Executive Director Matthew Bechstein issued a denial of the report, stating that it was untrue and that the organization would continue operating as it had. But the following day he admitted that "I posted what I had to on Facebook so I wouldn't scare our members and thwart our fundraising efforts. I wanted to mitigate a disaster." He then stated that GOProud did indeed plan to file dissolution papers with the government.

In October 2014, Speaker of the House John Boehner fundraised for Carl DeMaio, an openly gay Republican candidate for the United States House of Representatives.

On February 28, 2015, the California Republican Party officially recognized the Log Cabin Republicans, receiving overwhelming support for a charter at the state party's biannual convention in Sacramento.

On August 16, 2015, the Republican National Committee rejected two anti-gay resolutions. The first one was that "schools that are teaching the homosexual lifestyle in their sexual education class also include the harmful physical aspects of the lifestyle." The second would have encouraged Congress and states to pass laws in an effort to nullify Obergefell v. Hodges.

On September 20, 2015, in a near-unanimous vote, the California Republican Party removed anti-gay communications from its platform and added to the platform that "We support laws prohibiting discrimination in employment and housing based on race, ethnicity, nationality, sex, sexual orientation, disability, or religion."

=== Presidency of Donald Trump ===
During his campaign for the Presidency, Trump was noted for being the first Republican nominee to make open overtures to the LGBTQ+ community, stating during the Republican National Convention that he would "do everything in [his] power to protect our LGBTQ+ citizens from the violence and oppression of a hateful foreign ideology", referring to the Orlando nightclub shooting in 2016. In response to the applause, Trump ad-libbed: "And I have to say, as a Republican, it is so nice to hear you cheering for what I just said. Thank you." While his speech was seen as LGBTQ+-inclusive, his policy positions such as reviewing the Johnson Amendment, which prohibited tax-exempt organisations from endorsing candidates, and his stated aim of seeking an equally conservative replacement for Justice Antonin Scalia were seen as warming to the evangelical community and antithetical to LGBTQ+ rights.

Upon taking office in 2017, President Trump decided to keep in place certain federal protections for LGBTQ+ workers implemented during the Obama administration. However, some of these protections were reversed in August 2019. In July 2017, Trump announced that he was reinstating a ban on openly transgender troops serving in the US military if they were in the process of transitioning. The ban was later allowed to take effect by the U.S. Supreme Court.

Shortly after entering office, the Trump Administration removed all references to LGBTQ+ people and all links to content, resources, and programs from all federal websites. The Department of Labor later removed sections from its website about workplace rights and resources for LGBTQ+ workers, including the page on "Advancing LGBTQ+ Workplace Rights". In January 2017, the State Department removed nearly every mention of LGBTQ+ issues. In March 2017, the Census Bureau concluded they no longer needed to ask about sexual orientation and gender identity in their survey, which helps determine how to distribute hundreds of billions of federal dollars. In June 2017, HHS stopped including a question on sexuality in its federal survey, but the question was restored after an outcry from LGBTQ+ advocates. In October 2017, Health and Human Services removed all mentions of the LGBTQ+ population and their health needs in their Strategic Plan for fiscal years 2018–2022.

On August 8, 2017, David Glawe was sworn in as Under Secretary of Homeland Security for Intelligence and Analysis, making him the first openly gay Under Secretary of Homeland Security for Intelligence and Analysis to serve under a Republican presidential administration, and the first openly gay executive official serving in the Trump presidential administration. On December 11, 2017, James T. Abbott was sworn in as a member of the Federal Labor Relations Authority (FLRA), making him the first openly gay FLRA member to serve under a Republican presidential administration.

In October 2018, the Trump administration denied visas to the same-sex partners of foreign diplomats, including from nations that only offered some kind of civil partnership or that banned same-sex marriages. On May 8, 2018, Richard Grenell was sworn in as the United States Ambassador to Germany, making him the first openly gay United States Ambassador to Germany to serve under a Republican presidential administration. In July 2019, Trump nominated a third openly gay man, career Senior Foreign Service Officer Robert S. Gilchrist, as the ambassador to Lithuania. In 2020, Trump appointed Richard Grenell as the Acting Director of National Intelligence, for which he is often cited as first openly gay cabinet-level official despite Demetrios Marantis's previous service as acting USTR.

On May 16, 2019, Trump said that he was "absolutely fine" with the same-sex marriage of Mayor Pete Buttigieg of South Bend, Indiana, a presidential candidate in the Democratic primaries. Previously, he had sent mixed signals, saying both that he would consider judges who would overturn Obergefell v. Hodges, the landmark ruling in favor of same-sex marriage, while also saying he was fine with the legalization of same-sex marriage by the Supreme Court. In June 2019, Trump was the first sitting Republican president to recognize Pride Month. He also announced that he was making the global decriminalization of homosexuality a policy issue for his administration. Speaking to reporters about his Pride tweet, Kellyanne Conway, a counselor to the president and spokeswoman, claimed that Trump approves of same-sex marriage. In August 2019, the Trump administration proposed a policy change that would allow federal contractors to decline employment to people based on being LGBTQ+ or based on religion, and the administration excluded sexual orientation from its list of protections. Also in 2019, Log Cabin Republicans endorsed Trump for reelection. In 2020, the GOP retained the language from the 2016 platform including platform planks against same-sex marriage.

On June 7, 2019, the Trump administration requested U.S. embassies to discontinue flying the pride flag during Pride Month. During the Obama administration, the government granted blanket permission to embassies overseas to fly the pride flag during June.

In November 2019, The Trump administration proposed a rule that removed regulations that had banned discrimination based on sexual orientation in Health and Human Services programs – including adoption and foster care agencies. Under the rule, any organization – including foster care and adoption agencies or other entities that get funding from Health and Human Services – would be free to discriminate against gays if such discrimination was based on religious beliefs. In a statement, Alphonso David, the president of the Human Rights Campaign, called the proposal "horrific" and said it would "permit discrimination across the entire spectrum of HHS programs receiving federal funding". "The Trump-Pence White House is relying on the same flawed legal reasoning they've used in the past to justify discrimination against L.G.B.T.Q. people and other communities," he said. At the Supreme Court, in 2019, the Trump administration argued that Title VII of the Civil Rights Act of 1964 does not include or extend to sexual orientation. Instead, the Trump administration argued that Congress needed to pass its own legislation banning discrimination against LGBTQ+ people. However, when Congress proposed the LGBTQ+ Equality Act, which would add sexual orientation and gender identity to federal civil rights law to prevent discrimination against lesbian, gay, bisexual, transgender and queer people, Trump opposed the bill because he said it would conflict with "conscience and parental rights". After opposing the Equality Act, the Trump administration did not say whether the President would support or oppose the Fairness for All Act, a Republican-proposed alternative to the Equality Act; a spokesperson said that the Trump administration would review it.

During the coronavirus pandemic in 2020, the FDA, under the Trump administration, eased restrictions by allowing gay men to donate blood if they had refrained from sexual intercourse for three months prior to donation. In June 2020, President Trump rescinded non-discrimination protections for transgender people's access to healthcare services. In August 2020, a federal court blocked the Trump administration's reversal of those non-discrimination protections citing the Supreme Court's 6–3 ruling in favor of interpreting the Civil Rights Act to include sexual orientation and gender identity. When the Supreme Court ruled in favor of interpreting the Civil Rights Act of 1964's protection from discrimination based on 'sex' as including sexual orientation and gender identity, President Trump referred to that ruling, as well as other rulings such as on DACA, as "shotgun blasts" against him and the Republican Party.

Also in August 2020, President Trump retweeted that he was honored by the Log Cabin Republicans and Richard Grenell's endorsement of him. Richard Grenell joined the Republican National Committee to advise on outreach to LGBTQ+ voters, citing Trump's support of him. However, his record was further criticized over the Trump administration's efforts to deny citizenship to the children adopted or conceived by surrogacy, by same-sex parents. Even after a federal court ruled in favor of the citizenship for same-sex US parents, the Trump administration appealed the ruling.

President Trump nominated two openly LGBTQ+ candidates for the federal judiciary. In June 2018, he nominated Mary Rowland, who is openly lesbian and married, to the U.S. District Court for Northern Illinois. In October 2018, he nominated a prosecutor, Patrick Bumatay, who is openly gay, to the Ninth US Circuit Court of Appeals. In July 2019, the Senate confirmed the appointment of Mary Rowland, making her the first LGBTQ+ nominee to be confirmed during the Trump presidency. Also in 2019, Bumatay was confirmed by the Senate. President Trump also nominated judges with openly anti-LGBTQ+ records. Trump nominated, and the Senate confirmed, Matthew Kacsmaryk, a judge who once said that being transgender is a "mental disorder" and that support for LGBTQ+ rights is based on the "erotic desires of liberated adults".

== Demographics ==
Between 2012 and 2024, exit polling suggests that the LGBT ranged between 64% and 86% for the Democratic presidential candidate.

According to the 2016 Cooperative Congressional Election Study, slightly more than eleven percent (11.8%) of non-heterosexuals in the United States describe their political ideology as either somewhat conservative, conservative, or very conservative, compared to about sixty percent (60.2%) who would describe their political ideology as either somewhat liberal, liberal, or very liberal and about nineteen percent (19.1%) who describe their political ideology as middle-of-the-road.

A February 11, 2016 survey of nearly 700 readers of the Georgia Voice found that among LGBTQ+ Georgians, Hillary Clinton won 54% of the vote, Bernie Sanders won 40.5% of the vote, and 5.5% said they would be voting for one of the remaining Republican candidates in the Georgia presidential primary.

A 2014 Gallup survey, conducted from January 2 to June 30, 2014, found that 21% of LGBTQ+ Americans are Republican or lean Republican and 20% identify as conservative. It also found that 18% of LGBTQ+ Americans age 18 to 34 years old and aged 35 to 54 years old are Republican or lean Republican, compared to 29% among LGBTQ+ Americans over the age of 55 years.

A 2012 Gallup survey, conducted June 1 to September 30, 2012, found 13% of LGBTQ+ Americans are Republican, 20% identify as conservative, and 22% plan or lean towards voting for Mitt Romney. LGBTQ+ Americans who support Mitt Romney tend to be older, white, more religious, and more likely to be married. Romney's LGBTQ+ supporters are nearly twice as likely as Obama's LGBTQ+ supporters to be seniors aged 65 or older (19% vs. 10%, respectively). Nearly nine in 10 LGBTQ+ Romney supporters (87%) are white, compared with two-thirds of LGBTQ+ Obama supporters (66%). Nearly two-thirds of LGBTQ+ Romney supporters (63%) say that religion is important to them, and more than 45% say that they attend a church, synagogue, or mosque at least once a month. Among LGBTQ+ Obama supporters, 43% say religion is important to them, and 31% go to church at least once a month. Nearly half of LGBTQ+ Romney supporters (49%) are married or living with a partner, compared with 39% of Obama LGBTQ+ supporters.

=== Political attitudes ===
==== Foreign policy ====
Both LGBTQ+ and non-LGBTQ+ fiscal/economical and libertarian conservatives have common views when it comes to foreign policy. Both criticize state-sanctioned discrimination against LGBTQ+ people by countries such as Russia, Iran and China along with support for European Union. Social conservatives on the other side usually support countries that oppose LGBTQ rights, especially ones with a Christian majority (e.g., in Central America, the Caribbean, Sub-Saharan Africa, Eastern Europe, Oceania and the Pacific Ocean).

==== National conservatism ====
In 2009, Christopher Barron said about GOProud that "I want pro-life gays to know they have a home here." In February 2011, he responded to Tim Pawlenty, calling for defunding the repeal of Don't Ask, Don't Tell by stating that he would be better served talking about the need to defund Planned Parenthood and end federal funding for abortion. Ann Coulter, a former member of the GOProud advisory council and a long-time advocate of LGBT conservatism, stated that "the gays have got to be pro-life," because "as soon as they find the gay gene, guess who the liberal yuppies are gonna start aborting?" Jimmy LaSalvia, the co-founder of GOProud, is opposed to legal abortion care and warned the gay community that they should for banning abortion because of the threat of selective abortions of gay fetuses. Deplorable Pride, a North Carolina-based LGBTQ+ alt-right organization, has also supported the criminalization of abortion, while also holding extremist views, including the killing of all Muslims.

=== Political behavior ===
==== Voting patterns ====
Year	Election	% of LGBT voters who voted Republican
1990	United States House of Representatives	22%
1992	United States House of Representatives	23%
1992	United States Presidency	14%
1994	United States House of Representatives	26%
1996	United States House of Representatives	27%
1996	United States Presidency	23%
1998	United States House of Representatives	33%
2000	United States House of Representatives	32%
2000	United States Presidency	25%
2004	United States House of Representatives	24%
2004	United States Presidency	23%
2006	United States House of Representatives	24%
2008	United States House of Representatives	19%
2008	United States Presidency	27%
2010	United States House of Representatives	29%
2012	United States House of Representatives	20%
2012	United States Presidency	22%
2014	United States House of Representatives	24%
2016	United States Presidency	14%
2016	United States House of Representatives	18%
2018	United States House of Representatives	17%
2020	United States Presidency	27%
2020	United States House of Representatives	31%

== LGBT+ Republicans ==
=== House of Representatives ===
Photo	Representative	State	Party	Term	Notes
Bauman	Robert Bauman	Maryland	Republican	1973–1981	Came out after time in Congress
Hinson	Jon Hinson	Mississippi	Republican	1979–1981	Came out after time in Congress
Gunderson	Steve Gunderson	Wisconsin	Republican	1981–1997	Outed on the floor of the House in 1994
Kolbe	Jim Kolbe	Arizona	Republican	1985–2007	Came out in 1996 after voting for the Defense of Marriage Act
Huffington	Michael Huffington	California	Republican	1993–1995	Came out as bisexual in 1998, the first bisexual to have been elected to Congress
Foley	Mark Foley	Florida	Republican	1995–2006	Came out after congressional page incidents
Schock	Aaron Schock	Illinois	Republican	2009–2015	Came out after time in Congress
	George Santos	New York	Republican	2023	Openly gay. Expelled.

=== U.S. State Legislators ===
==== Arizona ====
- State Representative Steve May (1998–2002)
- State Representative Matt Gress (2023–present)

==== California ====
- State Senator and Assemblyman Roy Ashburn (1996–2010; came out in 2010)

==== Iowa ====
- State Representative Austin Harris (2023–present)

==== Maryland ====
- State Delegate Meagan Simonaire (2015–2019)

==== Massachusetts ====
- State Representative Althea Garrison (1993–1995); first transgender person elected to a state legislature in the United States.
- State Representative Patrick Guerriero (1993–1997)
- State Senate Minority Leader and State Representative Richard Tisei (1985–2011)

==== Michigan ====
- State Representative Leon Drolet (2001–2007)
- State Representative Jim Dressel (1979–1984)

==== Minnesota ====
- State Senator Paul Koering (2003–2011); first openly gay Republican elected state legislator in Minnesota

==== Mississippi ====
- State Representative Greg Davis (1991–1997)

==== Missouri ====
- State Representative Phil Christofanelli (2017–2025; came out in 2021)
- State Representative Tom Hannegan (2017–2021)
- State Representative Chris Sander (2021–2025)
- State Representative Zachary Wyatt (2011–2013; came out in 2012)

==== New Hampshire ====
- State Representative Joe Alexander Jr. (2018–present)
- State Senator Daniel Innis (2016–2018, 2022–present)
- State Representative Corey Corbin (2000–2004)
- State Representative Steve Vaillancourt (1996–2017)
- State Representative Yvonne Dean-Bailey (2014–2018)

==== New Jersey ====
- State Assemblyman Don Guardian (2021–present)
- State Assemblywoman Hazel Gluck (1980–1982)

==== New Mexico ====
- State Representative John Block (2023–present)

==== New York ====
- State Assemblyman Ronald Castorina (2016–2019) (came out after leaving the Assembly)

==== North Dakota ====
- State Representative Randy Boehning (2002–2018)

==== Pennsylvania ====
- State Representative Mike Fleck (2007–2014; came out in 2012)

==== Ohio ====
- State Representative Tim Brown (2013–2016)

==== Oregon ====
- State Representative Chuck Carpenter (1995–1999)

==== South Carolina ====
- State Representative Jason Elliott (2016–present)

==== Tennessee ====
- State Representative Eddie Mannis (2021–present)

==== Washington ====
- State Representative Skyler Rude (2019–present)
- State Senator James West (1983–2003)

==== West Virginia ====
- State Delegate Joshua Higginbotham (2017–present)

==== Wisconsin ====
- State Assemblyman Todd Novak (2015–present, came out in 2016); first openly gay Republican elected state legislator in Wisconsin

==== Wyoming ====
- State Representative Dan Zwonitzer (2005–present)

=== Mayors ===
==== Arizona ====
- Mayor of Tempe, Neil Giuliano (1994–2004); first openly gay elected Republican mayor (came out in 1996)

==== California ====
- Mayor of Redondo Beach, Mike Gin (2005–2013)

==== Massachusetts ====
- Mayor of Melrose, Patrick Guerriero (1998–2001)
- Mayor of Attleboro, Kevin Dumas (2004–2018)

==== New Jersey ====
- Mayor of Chatham Borough, Bruce Harris (2012–present); first openly gay elected African American Republican mayor
- Mayor of Atlantic City Don Guardian (2014–2017)

==== New York ====
- Mayor of Plattsburgh, Daniel Stewart (2000–2006)

==== Pennsylvania ====
- Mayor of Kennett Square, Matthew Fetick (2016–present)

==== Utah ====
- Mayor of Big Water, Willy Marshall (2001–present)

=== Local officials ===
==== Arizona ====
- Sheriff of Pinal County, Paul Babeu (2009–2017)
- Madison School District member, Matt Gress (2016–present)

==== District of Columbia ====
- Council member David Catania (1998–2015)

==== California ====
- San Diego County District Attorney Bonnie Dumanis (2003–2017)
- San Diego City Council member Carl DeMaio (2008–2012)
- Member of the Carpinteria City Council (2002–2006) and Treasurer of the California Republican Party Greg Gandrud (2019–present)
- Menlo Park Council member Catherine Carlton (2012–present)

==== Idaho ====
- Meridian Parks and Recreation President Dom Gelsomino (2018–present)

==== Illinois ====
- New Trier Township Clerk Jerome Hoynes (2009–present)

==== Massachusetts ====
- Charlton Public Library Trustee and Charlton Constable Jordan Evans (2016–present)
- Paxton, Finance Committee Member Cotey J. Collins (2019–2020)

==== Michigan ====
- Vice President of Fennville Public Schools Board of Education Tobias Hutchins (2015–present)

==== Minnesota ====
- Oakdale Council member Kevin Zabel (2016–present)
- Crow Wing County Commission member Paul Koering (2017–present)

==== New Jersey ====
- Chatham Borough Council member Bruce Harris (2004–2012)
- Roselle Park Borough Council member Thos Shipley (2016–present)
- Roselle Park Borough Council member Joseph DeLorio (2018–present)

==== New York ====
- Plattsburgh City Council member Daniel Stewart (1994–2000)
- Member of the New York City Council, 50th District, David Carr (2021–Present)

==== Oregon ====
- Clackamas County Commissioner Ben West (2018–present)

==== Pennsylvania ====
- Wilkes-Barre Council member Tony Brooks (2016–present)

==== Utah ====
- Utah County Commission Nathan Ivie (2016–present)
- Ogden Council member Marcia White (2014–present)

=== Others ===
- Bruce Bawer, writer
- Patrick J. Bumatay, former Assistant United States Attorney, Southern District of California and now judge on the Ninth Circuit United States Court of Appeals
- Dale Carpenter, legal commentator and Earl R. Larson Professor of Civil Rights and Civil Liberties Law, University of Minnesota Law School
- Tammy Bruce, on-air contributor and writer, Fox News
- James Kirchick, reporter, foreign correspondent, author, and columnist
- Jimmy LaSalvia, co-founder, GOProud
- Liberace, entertainer
- Deirdre McCloskey, Distinguished Professor of Economics, History, English, and Communication, University of Illinois at Chicago and Professor of Philosophy and Classics. University of Illinois at Chicago
- Justin Raimondo, author and the editorial director, Antiwar.com
- Dave Rubin, host, The Rubin Report
- Andrew Sullivan, author, editor and blogger
- Norah Vincent, writer
- Lucian Wintrich, White House correspondent, The Gateway Pundit
- Blaire White, political commentator
- Amber Rose, model and television personality.
- Scott Presler, activist

==== Registered Republicans ====
- Christopher R. Barron, co-founder, GOProud
- Scott Bessent, 79th United States Secretary of the Treasury
- Peter Boykin, US Congressional Candidate, American political commentator, podcaster, author, citizen journalist, and President and Founder of Gays for Trump
- Marc Cherry, television writer and producer
- Scott Evertz, president, the Wisconsin Log Cabin Republicans
- Richard Grenell, United States Ambassador to Germany
- Michael A. Hess, chief legal counsel to the Republican National Committee
- Daniel Innis, academic and businessman
- Caitlyn Jenner, media personality, former athlete, and 2021 California gubernatorial recall election Republican candidate
- Fred Karger, 2012 Republican presidential candidate
- Ken Mehlman, 61st Chairman of the Republican National Committee
- Terry Dolan, co-founder and chairman of the National Conservative Political Action Committee
- Guy Benson, commentator, editor, talk radio personality, and Fox News contributor
- Don Norte, gay rights activist
- Kevin Norte, gay rights activist
- Peter Thiel, entrepreneur, venture capitalist, hedge fund manager, and social critic
- Arthur H. Vandenberg Jr., White House staffer during the Presidency of Dwight D. Eisenhower
- Brandon Straka, Founder of the WalkAway campaign
- Deadlee, Rapper, Actor and Podcaster

== Organizations ==
- Gays for Trump
- Log Cabin Republicans
- Pro-Life Alliance of Gays and Lesbians

=== Defunct ===
- Gay Voter's League
- GOProud

== See also ==
- LGBT conservatism
- Conservative Democrat
- LGBT rights in the United States
- Gays Against Groomers
- Asian American and Pacific Islands American conservatism in the United States
- Black conservatism in the United States
- Hispanic and Latino conservatism in the United States
- Women in conservatism in the United States
