= Log Cabin Republicans =

U.S. Republican Party advocacy group

- Abbreviation: LCR
- Formation: 1977
- Type: 501(c)(4) organization
- Tax ID no.: 52-1811081
- Headquarters: Washington, D.C.
- Region served: United States
- Chairman: Alex Walton
- Executive director: Ed Williams
- Affiliations: Republican Party
- Website: logcabin.org

Log Cabin Republicans (LCR) is an organization of gay, lesbian, and bisexual members of the Republican Party and straight allies who work to increase inclusion within the party, and to voice Republican values in the queer community. LCR has over 30 chapters from about half of the states and the District of Columbia.

LCR began in 1977 during opposition to an anti-gay ballot initiative in California, defeated in 1978. The organization has endorsed or withheld endorsement of Republican presidential candidates based on perceived agreement on varying issues regarding equality and inclusion.

Log Cabin Republicans filed a federal lawsuit against the Don't Ask, Don't Tell (DADT) government policy, which went to trial in 2010. The presiding judge ruled in favor of LCR in September, finding the policy unconstitutional, though the decision was vacated a year later after DADT was repealed in December 2010. LCR officially added transgender rights to its platform in 2015, but dropped it in August 2026, rebranding themselves as an "LGB" advocacy group.

LCR has no official position regarding abortion and believes in a strong national defense. In the 2020s, several state chapters took positions against transgender rights, which brought criticism from broader advocacy and rights groups. Other critics say LCR is too centrist regarding party principles. More recent criticism involves LCR's continued support for President Trump after his administrations' actions against certain rights for transgender people.

== History ==
Log Cabin Republicans was formed in 1977 in California as a rallying point for Republicans opposed to the Briggs Initiative, which attempted to ban homosexuals from teaching in public schools, and proposed legislation that authorized the firing of those teachers who publicly "supported" homosexuality.

While mounting his imminent presidential campaign, Ronald Reagan publicly expressed his opposition to the discriminatory policy. Reagan's condemnation of the bill—epitomized in a letter sent to a pro-Briggs group, excerpts of which were re-printed in the San Francisco Chronicle in 1978—played an influential role in the eventual defeat of the Briggs Initiative.

In the midst of this victory, gay conservatives in California created the Log Cabin Republicans. The group initially proposed to name themselves Lincoln Club, but found that name was already in use by the Lincoln Club of Orange County, another California Republican organization, so the name Log Cabin Republicans was chosen as an alternative title. This designation calls attention to the first Republican president, Abraham Lincoln. The Log Cabin Republicans suggest that Lincoln founded the Republican Party on the philosophies of liberty and equality. These principles, Log Cabin argues, are consistent with their platform of an inclusive Republican Party.

=== 1992 presidential election ===
The 1992 Log Cabin Republican convention was held in Spring, Texas, a Houston exurb. The main point of discussion was whether or not LCR would endorse the re-election of President George H. W. Bush. The group voted to deny that endorsement because Bush did not denounce anti-gay rhetoric at the 1992 Republican National Convention.

=== 1996 presidential election ===
In August 1995, the campaign of Republican presidential candidate, Bob Dole, returned the LCR's $1,000 campaign contribution. The campaign returned the contribution after the openly lesbian columnist, Deb Price, of the Detroit News, asked about it after she saw it on a public report from the Federal Election Commission. The campaign sent a written statement to Price saying that Dole was in "100% disagreement with the agenda of the Log Cabin Republicans." The finance office of the campaign had solicited the contribution from LCR. At the event where it was given, Dole had personally spoken with LCR's then-executive director, Rich Tafel, about the group and about AIDS legislation it was promoting in the Senate. Weeks earlier, Dole agreed to co-sponsor the legislation after a meeting with Tafel at the campaign's headquarters. It resulted in a front-page story in The New York Times, penned by Richard L. Berke, then-chief political reporter for the daily.

As reporters, including Berke, were seeking confirmation of the story before it broke, Dole's finance chairman, John Moran, asked Tafel not to speak to the press and that Tafel's "steadfastness and statesmanship at this moment will be handsomely appreciated in the long run by the campaign." Tafel refused.

Pundits accused Dole of being a "flip-flopper and a hypocrite." Editorials ran in major newspapers, including The Washington Post, The New York Times, The Boston Globe, the Atlanta Journal-Constitution, and The Times of London, condemning Dole's action, joined by radio commentators Rush Limbaugh and Don Imus. Under the pressure, Dole admitted during an October 1995 press briefing on Capitol Hill that he regretted the decision to return the check, and that his campaign was responsible for it without consulting him. "I think if they'd have consulted me, we wouldn't have done that, wouldn't have returned it," Dole said. Dole later told Washington Post editor and author Bob Woodward that the LCR episode was a "mistake" because the decision to return the check "gets into Bob Dole the person. It's not so much about Bob Dole the candidate. It's the person. Is he tolerant? Does he tolerate different views? Tolerate someone with a different lifestyle?" He added, "This is basic, this is what people ought to know about you. Are you going to just do this because it sounds good politically?"

LCR's leadership met with Dole's coalitions manager to discuss an endorsement after Dole's reversal. Among various items, Tafel demanded there be no gay bashing in the speeches from the podium of the 1996 Republican National Convention, nor any anti-homosexual signs on the convention floor. He also wanted to see a gay person address the convention and a public request from Dole's campaign for the LCR nod. On the closing night of the convention, Stephen Fong, then-president of the San Francisco chapter, spoke at the dais as part of a series of speeches from "mainstreet Americans," but was not publicly identified as gay. Nevertheless, his presence on the podium for the organization and for the gay and lesbian community "was something that would have been unimaginable four years earlier," Tafel later wrote. Fong was the first openly gay speaker at a Republican National Convention.

Two days later, Dole spokesperson Christina Martin told a reporter that the campaign "welcomed the endorsement of the Log Cabin Republicans." LCR voted to endorse Dole for President, and then-Republican National Committee chairman Haley Barbour approved the use of the RNC's press briefing room for Tafel, LCR's convention delegates and officers of its national board to announce their decision.

Later in the campaign, Tafel met with Dole's chief aide Sheila Burke, and the remaining demands LCR made for their endorsement were met. In a statement released by LCR, and confirmed to reporters by the campaign, Dole had pledged to maintain an executive order prohibiting discrimination based on sexual orientation in the federal workforce and full funding for AIDS programs.

=== 2000 presidential election ===
The group endorsed George W. Bush in 2000.

=== 2004 presidential election ===
Due to his support of the Federal Marriage Amendment, the group declined to endorse the reelection of George W. Bush in 2004. The proposed amendment would have constitutionally defined marriage as exclusively between one man and one woman. Bush's defense of the FMA led the group to vote 22 to 2 against an endorsement of his reelection. The Palm Beach County chapter in Florida did endorse him, resulting in the revocation of their charter.

=== 2008 presidential election ===
In September 2008, LCR voted to endorse the John McCain–Sarah Palin ticket in the 2008 presidential election. LCR President Patrick Sammon said the most important reason for their support was McCain's opposition to the proposed constitutional amendment to ban same-sex marriage.

=== 2012 presidential election ===
On 23 October 2012, LCR officially endorsed Mitt Romney despite Romney's commitment to a constitutional amendment barring gays and lesbians from marriage nationwide and his objection to the repeal of the "Don't Ask, Don't Tell" policy on military service. In a public statement, LCR said it supported Romney due to the "gravity of the economic and national security issues currently at stake". Moreover, LCR expressed its hope that Romney would reconsider his opposition to the Employment Non-Discrimination Act, but he did not.

=== 2016 presidential election ===
On October 22, 2016, the board members of LCR voted not to endorse the Republican nominee for president, Donald Trump. In defiance, the LCR statewide chapters of Colorado, Georgia, and Texas, along with the LCR countywide chapter of Orange County, California and the LCR city chapters of Houston, Texas; Los Angeles, California; Miami, Florida; and Cleveland, Ohio, voted to endorse Donald Trump.

Nationwide, exit polls estimated that Trump received the lowest percentage of the LGBT vote by any Republican presidential candidate since the metric was first included in presidential polls in 1992. Trump received only 14% of the LGBT vote, a significant decline from Mitt Romney who received 22% in 2012. On November 9, 2016, the national LCR congratulated Donald Trump on his victory.

=== 2020 presidential election ===
In November 2018, Jerri Ann Henry became the first woman to serve as Log Cabin executive director. A month later, she said in a television interview that, while she perceived Trump as having been "vocally supportive" of LGBT people compared to other Republican presidents and presidential candidates, there had nevertheless been "a lot of ups and downs in the last two years with some of the administration's actions."

On August 16, 2019, more than a year prior to the election, the Log Cabins endorsed Trump. Chair Robert Kabel and vice chair Jill Homan gave their reasons for the endorsement in a Washington Post op-ed. Three women resigned in protest: board member Jennifer Horn (who earlier in the year had served as campaign manager for Trump's 2020 primary challenger Bill Weld), Log Cabin's first woman board member Sarah Longwell, and executive director Jerri Ann Henry.

NBC exit polls found that 27% of LGBT voters chose Trump. A subsequent online poll done on behalf of GLAAD and weighted for demographics found that 14% of LGBT voters chose Trump.

=== 2024 presidential election ===
In April 2024, Melania Trump was the guest of honor at a Log Cabin Republicans fundraiser in Mar-a-Lago, raising over $1 million according to organizers. This launched the Log Cabin "Road to Victory" program to reach voters in swing states and marked a rare appearance by Melania Trump at a political event. In July, she hosted a second LCR fundraiser at Trump Tower, raising $1.4 million. For the April appearance, Trump was paid $237,500 but the Log Cabin Republicans denied that they made the payment. An anonymous source told CNN that former first Trump administration official Richard Grenell made the payment. As of September 2024, it was not known if Trump was paid for the July appearance.

A fundraising event organized by Log Cabin Republicans was held on October 22, 2024, in Charlotte, North Carolina—a state considered to be one of the battleground states in the 2024 election. The event was promoted as supporting the LGBT community within the Trump campaign. However, reports following the event indicated that there were no rainbow flags present, a symbol of the LGBT community that is normally prominent in events in support of it. Speakers at the event rejected calls for equality as "victim mentality", and instead insisted that the LGBT community has already reached equality. Headliners at the event included Grenell and Lara Trump.

NBC exit polls found that 13% of LGBT voters chose Trump.

== Log Cabin Republicans v. United States ==
A lawsuit filed by LCR in federal court challenging the "Don't Ask, Don't Tell" (DADT) policy, which excluded openly gay, lesbian, or bisexual persons from serving in the U.S. military, went to trial on July 13, 2010, presided by Judge Virginia Phillips. LCR argued that the policy violates the rights of homosexual military members to free speech, due process and open association. The government argued that DADT was necessary to advance a legitimate governmental interest. LCR introduced several admissions by President Barack Obama, including that DADT "doesn't contribute to our national security," "weakens our national security," and that reversing DADT is "essential for our national security". Rather than address plaintiff's claims or bring evidence to support their own claims of national interest, the government relied exclusively on the policy's 1993 legislative history.

On September 9, 2010, Phillips ruled in favor of plaintiffs, finding that DADT violates the First and Fifth Amendments to the United States Constitution.

On September 29, 2011, the United States Court of Appeals for the Ninth Circuit vacated the district court's decision, ruling that the legislative repeal of "don't ask, don't tell" by President Barack Obama and the outgoing Democratic congressional majority in December 2010 rendered the case moot. The dismissal left the lower court ruling without value as precedent.

== Platform ==
LCR acts under the statement: "We are loyal Republicans. We believe in limited government, strong national defense, free markets, low taxes, personal responsibility, and individual liberty. Log Cabin Republicans represents an important part of the American family—taxpaying, hard working people who proudly believe in this nation's greatness. We also believe all Americans have the right to liberty and equality. We believe equality for LGBT Americans is in the finest tradition of the Republican Party. We educate our Party about why inclusion wins. Opposing gay and lesbian equality is inconsistent with the GOP's core principles of smaller government and personal freedom."

On social issues, LCR either dissents from social conservatism or is neutral. On matters relating to gay and lesbian rights, LCR advocates for same-sex marriage and tax equity for domestic partner benefits. The LCR website also includes an "Equality Map" giving information on state laws in areas from employment discrimination and relationship recognition to hate crimes protections and anti-bullying laws.

=== Abortion ===
LCR takes no official position on abortion.

=== National defense ===
On the issue of national defense: "Log Cabin Republicans believe in a confident foreign policy and a strong national defense. As the world's sole military superpower, it is vital that the United States remain ready and able to shoulder its responsibilities in the global arena while standing as a beacon of freedom. Log Cabin Republicans call attention to the cruel and abusive treatment of gays and lesbians worldwide, particularly as it coincides with authoritarian regimes renowned for supporting terrorism and disregarding other basic human rights."

=== Transgender rights ===
Nationally, LCR argues that transgender people, alongside gay, lesbian, and bisexual people, should have the right to adopt and to be free of workplace and housing discrimination. They support decriminalization of being transgender worldwide. In 2015, LCR's board of directors voted to add transgender rights to the organization's mission "out of a belief that all adults should be allowed to pursue their own happiness, free of government interference, as long as it did not impede on the inalienable rights of others". In 2017, the LCR asked Donald Trump to reinstate Obama-era protections for transgender students, including freedoms to use the bathroom that aligns with their gender identity.

However, in the early 2020s, some local chapters took positions against transgender rights. The New Hampshire and Texas chapters support laws that "out" transgender youth to their families and refuse gender-affirming care to youth. In 2022, members of the San Antonio chapter joined an armed protest of a Christmas-themed drag show at the Aztec Theatre (though LCR's president at the time, Charles Moran, said he had no knowledge of the chapter's involvement). Moran, when Florida's "Don't Say Gay" bill was being drafted, advised the sponsor against requiring teachers to inform parents that their children may be gay or transgender. However, he otherwise agreed with the DeSantis administration's actions to restrict children's access to information about LGBT people.

In 2023, the Virginia chapter of the Log Cabin Republicans supported Governor Glenn Youngkin's LGBTQ+ policies, with LCR's then-president Moran endorsing "common-sense protections for biological women" and alleging that a "radical gender theory" is being taught in schools and must be opposed. This move was criticized by local LGBTQ+ advocacy group Equality Virginia.

When the Human Rights Campaign issued a state of emergency for the LGBT community, Moran condemned the HRC, citing Biden's signing of a law supporting same-sex marriage as an argument for why LGBT people were not currently in danger. In this statement, Moran spoke derisively of trans liberation, stating that, "the HRC is destructively redefining support for the LGBT community around trans surgeries for minors, biological men competing in women's sports, and sex and gender identity lessons in kindergarten."

According to historian Neil J. Young, most LGBT Republicans do not identify as "LGBTQ", but simply as lesbian, gay or bisexual as they believe that "LGBTQ has become a political identity rather than a sexual identity". As such, Log Cabin Republicans did not use the "Q" when calling themselves an "LGBT Republican organization".

Former LCR president Moran said the organization supports equality for all of its members, though there are some transgender 'guardrails', including no permanent gender transition for minors, and no sports competition between transgender and cisgender women.

In August 2026, LCR's board of directors officially voted to drop transgender rights from the organization's mission and rebranded themselves as an "LGB advocacy organization". There had reportedly been a large amount of infighting within the organization for years about whether it should "drop the T", and some members expressed disappointment with the decision. The organization's president, Ross Hemminger, cited disagreement with trans-supportive policies as reasons for dropping transgender rights from the platform, claiming that the transgender rights movement has ceased focusing on adults and now only focuses on minors. In response, a spokesperson for the Human Rights Campaign said "It's news to us that they ever pretended to care about the T. Splitting up the LGBTQ+ community and pitting us against each other is exactly what anti-equality forces want to see happen." The UK-based LGB Alliance similarly advocates against transgender inclusion.

== Membership ==
Since 1977, LCR has expanded across the United States and as of September 2025, has 80 chapters representing 40 states and the District of Columbia.

== Criticism ==
LCR has been criticized for not promoting socially conservative Republican principles. Focusing on "the battle for gay and lesbian civil rights" at its March–April 2005 convention and Liberty Education Forum National Symposium, panel topics included "Corporate Diversity"; "Family Fairness"; and "Is Sexual Orientation a Choice?". This led two Washington Post opinion columnists to say that "the Log Cabin Republicans are looking less and less Republican." As of 2022, the Texas GOP Convention has refused to allow the LCR to have a booth at the convention for at least twenty years. The state party's position has been criticized by Donald Trump Jr and by Richard Grenell.

Some in the LGBT community have expressed dissatisfaction with LCR, viewing it as a centrist organization that does not represent LGBT economic conservatives. In 2009, two former LCR members, Christopher R. Barron and Jimmy LaSalvia, formed GOProud to represent LGBT economic conservatives and libertarians; it was dissolved in 2014.

A 2016 article in The Sociological Quarterly summarizes in its abstract that the gay community is so diverse that boundaries between LGBT and straight politics are "more or less ambiguous and fluid", with Log Cabin Republicans showing "the practical limits of identity politics".

Former LCR president Greg Angelo described the "preservation of LGBT rights and support for the LGBT community" as hallmarks of Donald Trump's 2016 Presidential campaign, and asserted that support would continue during his presidency. On that same day as these comments were made, The New York Times reported that the Trump administration had rescinded Obama-era guidance on transgender students' rights. David Badash, editor-in-chief and founder of the New Civil Rights Movement has criticized LCR for not opposing this action. In 2017, Angelo described Trump as "the most pro-LGBT Republican president in history." In a February 2018 interview, he said that Trump recognizes marriage equality as the "settled law of the land, sent a letter of congratulations and commemoration [on Log Cabin's 40th anniversary], and has people in his Cabinet who support marriage equality." Angelo therefore concluded that "Trump is even better for the LGBTQ community than former President Barack Obama".

LCR's decision to include straight conservative Isabella Riley Moody as an "outspoken ambassador" for the group was questioned due to Moody's homophobic rhetoric. After stating in an interview that the LCR's statement of principles "really just grosses me out and makes me want to vomit" and posting on Twitter that "being ‘gay and proud’ is itself GROOMING," her name was removed from the group's website.

== See also ==
- Cultural liberalism
- DeploraBall
- Deplorable Pride
- GOProud
- Gays Against Groomers
- Gay Conservatives
- Gay Republicans
- Gays for Trump
- LGBT+ Conservatives, a similar organization affiliated with the British Conservative Party
- LGBTQ conservatism in the United States
- LGBTory, a similar organization affiliated with the Conservative Party of Canada
