= Casey Guernsey =

American politician

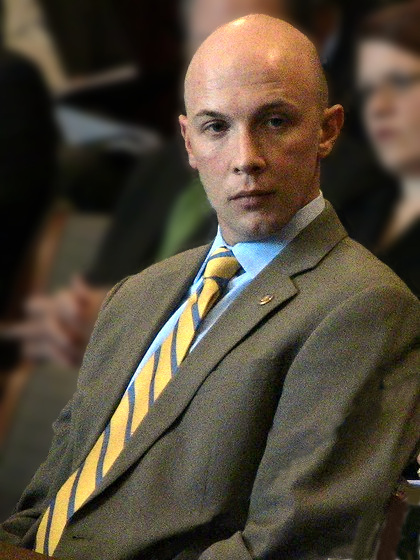
- Casey Guernsey in 2011

Member of the Missouri House of Representatives from the 2nd district
- In office January 7, 2013 – January 2015
- Preceded by: Zachary Wyatt
- Succeeded by: J. Eggleston

Member of the Missouri House of Representatives from the 3rd district
- In office 2009–2013
- Preceded by: Jim Whorton
- Succeeded by: Nate Walker

Personal details
- Born: October 14, 1980 (age 45) Colorado Springs, Colorado, U.S.
- Party: Republican
- Education: College of the Ozarks
- Profession: Farmer, policy analyst.

Casey Guernsey (born October 14, 1980) is an American politician. A Republican, he is a former member of the Missouri House of Representatives. Guernsey represented the 3rd, and then the 2nd District, encompassing all or portions of Daviess, Gentry, Grundy, Harrison, Mercer, Sullivan, and Worth counties in north central Missouri. Due to Missouri House redistricting following the 2010 U.S. Census, much of the current 3rd District was renamed the 2nd District effective January, 2013. The new boundaries include all of Daviess, DeKalb, Gentry, and Harrison counties, but no longer all or parts of Grundy, Mercer, Sullivan, or Worth counties. Guernsey ran for the newly created 2nd District and won in the November, 2012 general election. On January 31, 2014, Guernsey announced he would not be a candidate for re-election in the 2014 Missouri House races nor would he be running for any seat in the Missouri Senate.

== Personal history ==
Casey Lee Guernsey was born October 14, 1980, in the medical facilities at the United States Air Force Academy near Colorado Springs, Colorado. He is a 1999 graduate of South Harrison R-II High School in Bethany, Missouri. Following high school, Guernsey attended College of the Ozarks near Branson, Missouri, graduating with a Bachelor of Science degree in Business Administration in 2003. Representative Guernsey is a 7th generation family farmer and actively involved in the family dairy and beef production when not busy in the state legislature. Previously Guernsey served as a staff policy analyst for U.S.Congressmen Roy Blunt and Sam Graves in Washington, D.C. He is a member of the Blue Ridge Christian Union Church as well as active with the National Rifle Association of America, National Federation of Independent Business (NFIB), and Rotary International.

== Political history ==
Guernsey has a family history of political involvement. His ancestors include Senator Charles A. Guernsey and Richard Gentry, a former Missouri state Senator killed while leading troops at the Battle of Lake Okeechobee during the Seminole Wars. Casey Guernsey first ran for State Representative in 2006, losing to incumbent Jim Whorton. Whorton was term-limited under Missouri law from seeking reelection in 2008. In November of that year Guernsey defeated Democrat Mike Hepler to win his first term in the House. Guernsey ran unopposed in 2010. In November, 2012 Guernsey ran for the newly created 2nd District seat, defeating Independent candidate Jim Nash to earn a third term in the Missouri House.

Missouri 3rd District State Representative Election 2006
Party	Candidate	Votes	%	±%
Democratic	Jim Whorton	7,305	53.2	Winner
Republican	Casey Guernsey	6,416	46.8	

Missouri 3rd District State Representative Election 2008
Party	Candidate	Votes	%	±%
Republican	Casey Guernsey	9,924	62.2	Winner
Democratic	Mike Hepler	6,025	37.8	

Missouri 2nd District State Representative Election 2012
Party	Candidate	Votes	%	±%
Republican	Casey Guernsey	10,822	78	Winner
Independent	Jim Nash	3,055	22	

=== Legislative assignments ===
Representative Guernsey serves on the following committees:

- Chair, Agribusiness.
- Appropriations - Agriculture and Natural Resources subcommittee.
- Budget.
- Rules.
- Special Standing Committee on Renewable Energy.

=== Political future ===
On January 31, 2014, Representative Guernsey announced he would not be seeking re-election for a final two-year term from the 2nd District, as allowed under Missouri term limits. Neither, said Guernsey, would he be a candidate for the 12th District Missouri Senate seat being vacated by term-limited Republican Brad Lager, even after loaning his campaign committee $100,000 to run for the vacated Senate seat and clearing the primary field of opposition. Guernsey cited a desire to take a different direction in his life and the large time spent away from home serving his constituents as reasons for his decision. He did not rule out the possibility of running for elected office in the future, however, and vowed to stay active in Missouri Republican politics.
