= Gays Against Groomers =

American far-right and anti-LGBTQ group

- Formation: June 2022; 4 years ago
- Founder: Jaimee Michell
- Purpose: Far-right politics, anti-LGBTQ propaganda
- Location: United States
- Subsidiaries: Trans Against Groomers (Defunct)
- Website: gaysagainstgroomers.com

Gays Against Groomers (GAG) is an American far-right and anti-LGBTQ organization known for campaigning against gender-affirming care for minors, protesting school curriculum content with LGBTQ themes, criticizing Drag Queen Story Hour events, and opposing LGBTQ representation in children's media. The group also opposes trans women competing in women's sports and being allowed in women's spaces, pride events where children are present and brands marketing to LGBTQ people during Pride Month.

GAG began in June 2022 as a Twitter account created by Jaimee Michell, who had previously been employed by right-wing communications firms Arsenal Media and X Strategies and posted similar content on her personal account. The account is known for posting anti-trans rhetoric and has been compared to Libs of TikTok. Michell filed incorporation papers for GAG in September 2022. GAG has been banned from multiple social media and payment platforms for violating rules on hate speech; the group has been promoted by right-wing media outlets such as Fox News, One America News Network (OANN), and InfoWars.

According to GLAAD and the ADL, GAG uses the slur "groomer" along with ambiguous messaging to perpetuate the LGBTQ grooming conspiracy theory. GAG helped organize an anti-LGBTQ rally in Florida that was attended by other far-right and anti-LGBTQ organizations such as Moms for Liberty and the Proud Boys. It is classified as an anti-LGBTQ hate group by the Southern Poverty Law Center and is part of the 2020s anti-LGBTQ movement in the United States.

== History ==
=== Founding ===
Gays Against Groomers was founded by Jaimee Michell, a conservative lesbian who was at the time a content creator and lead designer at marketing company Arsenal Media, a conservative media organization specializing in creating viral content. Michell's website featured examples of her work for conservative candidates and activists.

Before the creation of the Gays Against Groomers account, Michell had a history of sharing far-right content, including anti-transgender content and QAnon and Pizzagate conspiracy theories, across multiple platforms on personal social media accounts, and had accused prominent liberal celebrities to being pedophiles. Michell fervently supports Donald Trump and had previously served on the advisory board of Trump's "Trump Pride coalition" and has described Trump as a "pro-gay" politician. Following the 2020 United States presidential election, Michell was involved in the "Stop the Steal" movement and frequently collaborated with Ali Alexander and Alex Bruesewitz to claim the election was "stolen". During the January 6 insurrection, Michell posted support for the rioters on social media, including reposting content from far-right political commentator Milo Yiannopoulos. Michell also compared public health measures during the COVID-19 pandemic to Nazi persecution and mocked the murder of George Floyd in 2020. After the latter got her suspended from Instagram, Mitchell complained that "right wing gays" were being treated like "thought criminals". In May 2022, Michell began working at X Strategies, a far-right social media communications firm. The firm was founded by Alex Bruesewitz, a right-wing activist who had previously been accused of paying online influencers as young as 14 to run advertisements for the Trump "Election Defense Fund."

GAG's Instagram account was created by Michell on June 6, 2022. The Twitter account described GAG as a "coalition of gays against the sexualization and indoctrination of children", with the purpose "to protect children from harm being done in our name and by those who have hijacked our community". The Twitter account gained 90,000 followers in a few months. In September 2022, Michell filed incorporation papers for GAG. Michell has denied that anyone is funding the account. GAG's application for tax exemption as a 501(c)(4) non-profit was approved in March 2023. In response to the accusations that they spread anti-LGBTQ propaganda, GAG claims that, because they are a "coalition of gay people," they cannot possibly be anti-LGBTQ. Additionally, they claim that any criticism of their organization is homophobic.

The group launched a partner coalition called Trans Against Groomers in September 2022. The group was made up of a small group of conservative trans people and detransitioners with the same positions and goals as Gays Against Groomers. At the time of its launch, Michell used the Trans Against Groomers group as justification for why GAG is not anti-trans and claimed that those who criticized the group were transphobic. As of April 2023, the social media accounts for Trans Against Groomers are no longer active and their website is gone.

=== Membership ===
In July 2023, more than 22 GAG members quit the organization after it was revealed that Michell had ties to Florida governor and then presidential hopeful, Ron DeSantis, who the week prior had made an ad criticizing Donald Trump for his past support of LGBTQ people and friendly relationship with Caitlyn Jenner, a conservative trans woman who had supported GAG up until that point. The ad was criticized by some GAG members for attacking Trump and lumping the LGB in with the T. Jenner claimed that not associating lesbian, gay and bisexual people with trans people is "the core significance of their group". GAG board member David Leatherwood called the ad "a slap in the face" for linking what he called "regular gay people" and "alphabet extremists who push radical woke ideology." Leatherwood also left the organization following the incident. In response to Jenner's exit, GAG posted a thread on Twitter attacking Jenner for her past support of pro-LGBTQ organizations and trans healthcare. Michell made a separate post calling Jenner a "fraud" and "the catalyst for the explosion of trans identifying youth".

According to the Southern Poverty Law Center, "GAG leadership, including the group's director of chapters Mario "Presents" Estrada, has been tied to the hate group the Proud Boys, members of which have previously rallied with GAG's Florida chapter leadership."

GAG's national director of legislation, Rich Guggenheim, who participated in a rally for GAG at the Colorado Capital in October 2024, has pushed back on the idea that Trump is against the LGBT community, claiming that far-right politicians such as Marjorie Taylor Greene, Lauren Boebert and Lara Trump, all supported him as a gay man and that, instead, Democrats were the ones "assaulting" LGB rights. In 2026, Guggenheim ran as a Republican candidate for the Colorado State Senate, but was defeated in the primaries. Also in 2026, Guggenheim helped campaign for Colorado's Proposition 134, which would ban trans girls from girls sports. When Colorado State Representative Brianna Titone, who is transgender, spoke out against the ballot initiative, Guggenheim sent her an email full of anti-trans slurs.

Several prominent GAG members have founded their own similar groups, including GAG's New York chapter leader, Marky Hutt, who founded LGBTrump and North Carolina chapter leader, Brian Talbert, who founded Deplorable Pride.

=== Suspensions and bans from platforms ===
By August 2022, Twitter had suspended and reinstated the social media account four times. Before Elon Musk's takeover of Twitter, the website's rules prohibited the use of "groomer" as an insult based on gender identity or expression under their hate speech policy. GAG responded by using code terms such as "broomer" and "gr__mer" and changing its screen name to "Gays Against Grewmers".

When Elon Musk bought Twitter, GAG reverted to its old name and tweeted "OK GROOMER". The group also purchased a verified badge. In October 2022, the account directly thanked Musk. A report from the Human Rights Campaign found that retweets of the GAG Twitter account's posts using the word "groomer" had grown by 300% when comparing the two months before and after Musk's purchase.

In 2022, TikTok banned the organization. Gays Against Groomers attempted to make new accounts on TikTok in July 2023. However, those accounts were quickly banned too.

In September 2023, they were temporarily suspended from Facebook and in October 2023, they were temporarily suspended from Instagram for posting "anti-LGBTQ hate content".

Additionally, as of October 2023, Google, Google Pay, PayPal, Venmo, Printful and Wix.com have all suspended or distanced themselves from Gays Against Groomers due to the organization violating their rules on hate speech.

In June 2024, Gays Against Groomers was banned from Reddit for the same reason.

GAG has responded to many of these bans and restrictions by creating new accounts on the platforms. However, many of these new accounts have been banned as well.

== Views ==
The group strongly opposes the transgender pride flag and the trans-inclusive progress pride flag, saying the progress pride flag "needs to be banned in all 50 states."

== Activities ==
=== Protests and rallies ===
In September 2022, the Castro Valley (California) Unified School District approved a student-initiated plan to paint Progress Pride flags on every school in the district. In response, Gays Against Groomers announced their California chapter would attend a protest of the school board meeting on social media, and encouraged others to join. A protester interviewed by ABC7News denied they were trying to foster a non-inclusive environment, saying, "I feel like we've been forced to talk to our kids, our young children especially about things we aren't ready to talk to them about".

Also in September 2022, the Miami-Dade School Board was considering declaring October LGBTQ+ History Month. The Board had made a similar declaration the previous year. Before the school board meeting, Gays Against Groomers had trucks drive around the city claiming the district teaches "radical gender ideology." The truck was also parked outside the board district meeting during the vote. Ultimately, the Board decided against declaring October LGBTQ+ History Month due to concerns that a declaration would conflict with the state's Parental Rights in Education law.

On December 3, 2022, a "Protect the Children" rally was held in Fort Lauderdale, Florida. It was organized by GAG, and it featured Moms for Liberty and Florida Fathers for Freedom. Antifa protesters planned to attend, requesting attendees bring "masks, signs, and rage". Jordan Toste was one of the scheduled speakers. Both the rally and the counterprotest were attended by elected officials. Equality Florida Senior Political Director Joe Saunders claimed that high school student Jack Petocz organized the counter protest and was taunted with the words "Where's Jack"? Equality Florida blamed such rallies on Governor Ron DeSantis' anti-LGBTQ politics and rhetoric.

In October 2023, GAG held the "Worldwide Stop the War on Children Rally," which had about a dozen attendees and garnered attention for its hateful signage which falsely accused trans people and LGBTQ activists of "coordinated child abuse". Three Republican Wisconsin state legislators, Reps. John Macco, Nate Gustafson, and Joy Goeben attended the rally.

=== Legislative advocacy ===
On August 19, 2022, Michell told OANN that GAG was working toward a federal ban on gender-affirming care for minors.

In January 2023, the head of the Arizona chapter of GAG, Robert Wallace, voiced his support for Arizona Senate Bill 1001, which would prohibit teachers and school officials from using a student's preferred pronouns without written parental permission if those pronouns do not match the student's gender assigned at birth. It would also permit school employees to ignore pronoun preferences if doing otherwise would violate their "religious and moral convictions". GAG was cited by Arizona lawmakers in support of Arizona Senate Bill 1030, which targets drag performances. Similar legislation restricting drag performances had been introduced in at least 11 states as of February 2023.

In January 2023, Ryan Woods, a drag artist also known as Lady MAGA USA, spoke on behalf of GAG in support of a ban on gender-affirming care for minors in Utah. Woods asserted that children were being groomed. Detransitioner Chloe Cole also spoke in favor of the bill.

In June 2023, GAG testified at a California school board meeting that "every teacher that has a pride flag in their classroom should be fired and arrested."

In April 2024, GAG sued five Democrats in the Colorado General Assembly for not allowing them the "right to deadname and misgender trans people in public testimony."

In May 2024, GAG's North Carolina Chapter leader, Brian Talbert, spoke at the "Stop School Porn" press conference in Raleigh, North Carolina, organized by the conservative nonprofit group NC Values Coalition, which called on the state legislature to ban "obscene" books from public schools. Talbert said at the rally: "The predators are using gay inclusion and acceptance as a gateway to bring this filth into our schools and into the minds of our children. We will never allow that — as Gays Against Groomers — to ever let that go unchallenged in this state."

In June 2024, GAG spoke in favor of a bill in Ohio that would ban drag performers from performing in locations that are not a "designated adult entertainment facility".

In November 2024, GAG voiced support for Nancy Mace's proposed bill which would ban transgender people from using single-sex facilities that differ from their sex assigned at birth on all federal property.

In March 2025, GAG released a statement voicing support for overturning state bans on conversion therapy for minors in the Supreme Court case Chiles v. Salazar.

=== Harassment of individuals ===
In September 2022, GAG successfully harassed members of the Miami-Dade County School Board in Florida into voting against a resolution recognizing LGBTQ History Month.

On December 19, 2022, gay New York City Councilmember Erik Bottcher, who was targeted by Gays Against Groomers, was taunted and harassed at his office and later at his home. His office was vandalized, the lobby of his apartment was broken into, and anti-gay slurs were left graffitied on his sidewalk. GAG members also protested against a Drag Story Hour event in Jackson Heights.

Also in December 2022, GAG retweeted footage of Rep. Katie Porter which had been doctored to claim she supported pedophilia. Porter had spoken out against the use of Twitter to falsely label people as pedophiles.

In October 2023, the Pulaski Community School District in Wisconsin was granted a restraining order against the leader of the GAG Wisconsin chapter, Jose "Rocky" Rodriguez, after GAG along with the far-right Twitter account Libs of TikTok posted false allegations that students at one school in the district were "subjected to graphic sexualized content" by a teacher who does drag. This resulted in harassment and intimidation directed at the district, its staff, and the school board by Rodriguez.

In December 2023, GAG doxxed Tara Lipsyncki, a drag queen and transgender activist from Utah. As a result, Lipsyncki faced "constant vitriol, intimidation, and death threats from right-wing extremists" and received "suspicious packages, constant drive-bys, and cryptic phone calls and messages". In April 2024, someone sent a bomb threat to a drag event that Lipsyncki was scheduled to attend. Lipsyncki notified local authorities about the harassment, but nothing was done. By July 2024, Lipsyncki was forced to sell her home to escape the threats and harassment.

=== Appearances in conservative and far-right media ===
In an August 2022 interview with OANN, the group's founder compared gender-affirming care to the experiments on Auschwitz prisoners by the Nazi SS doctor Joseph Mengele. Writing in LGBTQ Nation, Alex Bollinger criticized these comments, noting that the Nazis destroyed Magnus Hirschfeld's Institute of Sexology, which "did pioneering work on understanding LGBTQ identities, including transgender people".

On November 8, Michell blamed the Colorado Springs nightclub shooting – where a gunman killed five people, including two trans people, and injured over a dozen more – on gender-affirming care. Appearing on Tucker Carlson Tonight, Michell called the shooting "expected and predictable", saying that "I don't think [the violence is] gonna stop until we end this evil agenda that is attacking children". Brandon Wolf, a survivor of the Orlando nightclub shooting and press secretary of the LGBTQ rights group Equality Florida, described Michell's comments as "a crystal clear threat: 'The mass murders will continue until you do as you're told'".

Michell and other GAG members have appeared in fringe media such as One America News Network, Fox News, Infowars and various right-wing podcasts and has appeared in media with Steve Bannon, and Kyle Rittenhouse.

GAG has also had a presence at Turning Point USA's convention, AmericaFest.

=== Collaborations ===
In May 2024, Gays Against Groomers entered into a collaboration with Cherie Currie to sell merchandise. Currie had begun to express gender-critical views on social media in January 2024 and voiced support for GAG that May.

== Analysis and reception ==
Alejandra Caraballo, a clinical instructor at Harvard, described GAG as "a conservative funded propaganda account to push the groomer libel". In response, GAG used Caraballo's name as a discount code in connection with the sale of anti-trans merchandise.

Them.us has described GAG as a "Great Value version of the notoriously toxic Libs of TikTok". Columnist Wajahat Ali has accused GAG of fueling stochastic terrorism (the public condemnation of a group that leads to violent acts against the group).

According to GLAAD, GAG characterizes LGBTQ people as "pedophiles falsely and maliciously with the absolutely clear intent of driving fear", perpetuating the LGBTQ grooming conspiracy theory. Describing GAG as "an anti-LGBTQ+ extremist coalition", the Anti-Defamation League (ADL) has explained that "any person who pushes false claims and conspiracy theories about all or parts of the LGBTQ+ community" is an anti-LGBTQ extremist, "regardless of how they personally identify".

== See also ==
- LGB Alliance
- Log Cabin Republicans
- Deplorable Pride
- GOProud
- Gay Conservatives
- Gay Republicans
- Gays for Trump
