= Nate Walker =

American politician

Member of the Missouri House of Representatives from the 3rd district
- In office 2013–2019
- Preceded by: Casey Guernsey
- Succeeded by: Danny Busick

Personal details
- Born: April 18, 1952 (age 74) Anabel, Missouri
- Party: Republican
- Education: University of Missouri

Nathan Belt Walker (born April 18, 1952) is an American businessman, realtor, and politician from the state of Missouri. A Republican, Walker was elected to the Missouri House of Representatives from Missouri's 3rd District in November 2012. He represented the western portion Adair County (including the city of Kirksville) as well as all of Mercer, Putnam, and Sullivan counties. Walker previously served in the Missouri House of Representatives during the 1980s, and was a candidate for Missouri Lieutenant Governor in 1984.

== Early life and education ==
Walker was raised in rural Macon County, Missouri near the small community of Anabel. In a 2013 interview with The Missouri Times, Walker stated his dream growing up was to either be President of the United States or a catcher for the St. Louis Cardinals. Following graduation from Macon County R-1 high school in 1970 he attended the University of Missouri, earning a Bachelor of Science degree in Agricultural Journalism. Later he would earn a Master of Science in Community Affairs also from Mizzou. Walker would undertake post-graduate studies at Duke University and the Haus Rissen Institute of International Politics and Economics in Hamburg, Germany.

== Career ==
Throughout his career, Walker has alternately worked in both government and private sector. Putting his Agricultural Journalism degree to use, he previously owned and published The La Plata Home Press. Walker raised cattle on the family farm in Macon County as well. Governmental positions held by Walker during his career include:

- Director, Missouri Division of Highway Safety
- Director of administration, Missouri Attorney General's Office
- State rail planner, Missouri Department of Transportation
- Director of economic development, City of Boonville, Missouri
- Executive director, Northeast Missouri Regional Planning Commission

Other non-governmental leadership positions include:

- Director of operations, Missouri Automobile Dealers Association
- Director of development, Kemper Military School
- Executive director, Missouri Head Injury Association
- Executive director, Kirksville Downtown Improvement Committee (KDIC).
- Chairman, Kirksville Chamber of Commerce Governmental Affairs Committee.
- Chairman, Highway 63 Alternative Route Traffic Safety Commission.

Most recently, Walker has been working as an associate real estate broker in the Kirksville, Missouri area.

== Political career ==
Walker comes from a family background in politics. His uncle, Ronald M. Belt, was a member of the Missouri General Assembly from the 1950s through the early 1970s before becoming a judge. The young Walker attended pie suppers and other political events supporting his uncle while still a babe in his mothers arms. His maternal and paternal grandfathers were also involved in politics—one a Democrat the other Republican—and held various local elected positions on city council, county commission, and school board. Walker counts both Democrats and Republicans as political figures he looked up to and admires, notably fellow Missourians Harry S. Truman and Jerry Litton, and Conservative icon Ronald Reagan. After earning his degrees from the University of Missouri, Walker worked as a research analyst for the Missouri House of Representatives.

Walker's first attempt at elected office was not successful, as he ran for the Missouri House 12th district in 1978, losing to incumbent Democrat R. L. "Scoop" Usher. Walker again faced off against Usher in 1980 and won his first term as a state representative from the 12th District, a district that held all or parts of Knox. Linn, Macon and Shelby counties. Walker ran unopposed in November 1982 to retain his seat in the House. It was during this second term, in 1983, that Walker was elected Minority Whip for the Missouri House. While in the Missouri House Walker served on the Appropriations-Social Service/Corrections, Agri-Business, Higher Education, and Tourism Committees. In 1984 Nate Walker chose not to run for the 12th District House seat, instead seeking statewide office as Missouri Lieutenant Governor. Three other Republicans also filed for the office, and in the August primary Walker finished in second place behind Mel Hancock.

=== 2012 election ===
Walker had originally intended to run for a position as 1st district Adair County Commissioner in the 2012 election. However, the unexpected withdrawal of Representative Zachary Wyatt from the state representative race altered Walker's plans. He ran unopposed in the August Republican primary. In the November general election, he faced three-term former state representative Rebecca McClanahan, a Democrat whom Wyatt had defeated in November 2012. Walker defeated McClanahan by slightly over 2,000 votes, receiving 57.4 percent of the total cast.

== Legislative work ==
During the 97th Missouri General Assembly, Representative Walker served on the following committees:

- Agri-Business
- Workforce Development and Workplace Safety
- Higher Education
- Urban Issues
- Tourism and Natural Resources
- Special Standing Committee on Urban Issues
- Oral Health Issue Development
- Missouri Sportsman Issue Development
- Issue Development Standing Committee on Workers Freedom

During the Assembly's first session, Walker was the primary sponsor on two pieces of legislation in the House. He was also co-sponsor on a large number of other bills. At the conclusion of the session, Walker was honored by his fellow House members for his work on education issues by being selected "Freshman Legislator of the Year award for Education Issues".

== Electoral history ==
Missouri 3rd District State Representative Election 2012
Party	Candidate	Votes	%	±%
Republican	Nate Walker	8,298	57.4	Winner
Democratic	Rebecca McClanahan	6,156	42.6	

Missouri Lieutenant Governor Republican Primary 1984
Party	Candidate	Votes	%	±%
Republican	Mel Hancock	153,449	46.9	Winner
Republican	Nate Walker	118,901	36.3	
Republican	Tom Baldwin	42,463	12.9	
Republican	David R. Countie	12,131	3.7	

Missouri 12th District State Representative Election 1980
Party	Candidate	Votes	%	±%
Republican	Nate Walker	7,939	53.4	Winner
Democratic	R.L. "Scoop" Usher	6,770	46.3	

Missouri 12th District State Representative Election 1978
Party	Candidate	Votes	%	±%
Republican	Nate Walker	5,239	46.3	
Democratic	R.L. "Scoop" Usher	6,079	53.7	Winner

== Personal life ==
Walker has two sons, Madison and Sam. Walker is involved in Kirksville Rotary Club, Kirksville Arts Council, Kirksville Area Chamber of Commerce, National Rifle Association, Ducks Unlimited, Macon County Historical Society, Macon County FLywheel & Collectible Club, Macon Area Chamber of Commerce, Macon Elks Lodge, El Kadir Shrine Club, Ararat Shrine, and the Adair Masonic Lodge #366 AF & AM.
