= Danny Busick =

American politician

Member of the Missouri House of Representatives from the 3rd district
- Incumbent
- Assumed office 2019
- Preceded by: Nate Walker
- Succeeded by: Jeremy Mosley (elect)

Personal details
- Born: 1959 (age 66–67) Princeton, Missouri, U.S.
- Party: Republican
- Spouse: Sandy
- Children: 8
- Profession: businessman

Danny Busick (born 1959) is an American politician. He is a member of the Missouri House of Representatives from the 3rd District, serving since 2019. He is a member of the Republican Party.

== Career ==
In 2025, Busick sponsored legislation to increase taxes on agriculture land that includes leases to renewable energy projects.

== Electoral history ==
=== State representative ===
- Danny Busick was unopposed in the Republican primary elections in 2018 and 2020.

Missouri House of Representatives election, District 3, November 6, 2018
Party	Candidate	Votes	%	±%
Republican	Danny Busick	8,051	67.43%	−32.57
Democratic	Joni Perry	3,889	32.57%	+32.57
Total votes		11,940	100.00%	

Missouri House of Representatives election, District 3, November 3, 2020
Party	Candidate	Votes	%	±%
Republican	Danny Busick	12,555	100.00%	+32.57

Missouri House of Representatives Primary Election, August 2, 2022, District 3
Party	Candidate	Votes	%	±%
Republican	Danny Busick	3,542	76.34%	
Republican	Gary Ewing	1,098	23.66%	
Total votes		4,640	100.00%	

Missouri House of Representatives Election, November 8, 2022, District 3
Party	Candidate	Votes	%	±%
Republican	Danny Busick	9,529	100.00%	0.00
