= GOProud =

American conservative LGBT organization

- Formation: April 15, 2009
- Dissolved: June 2, 2014
- Type: LGBT, Republican
- Headquarters: Washington, D.C.
- Region served: United States
- Founders: Christopher R. Barron; Jimmy LaSalvia
- Affiliations: Metroplex Republicans Dallas; Right Pride; Republican Party
- Website: GOProud (archived page)

GOProud was an American tax-exempt 527 organization supported by fiscally conservative gay men, lesbians, bisexuals, and their allies. GOProud advocated for "free markets, limited government, and a respect for individual rights" and worked at the federal and state levels to build strong coalitions of liberal conservative and libertarian activists, organizations and policy makers to advance their shared values and beliefs.

GOProud was founded by Christopher R. Barron and Jimmy LaSalvia, two former Log Cabin Republican staffers who expressed dissatisfaction at that organization's generally centrist political positions. GOProud subsequently co-sponsored the Conservative Political Action Conference (CPAC) and added political commentator/author Ann Coulter, political commentator/strategist Margaret Hoover, Americans for Tax Reform President Grover Norquist, new media specialist Liz Mair, political analyst Lisa De Pasquale, and political communications consultant Chuck Muth.

In June 2014, it was reported that GOProud had ceased operations and was shutting down as a political committee. After initial denials, the executive director later confirmed that they were "leaving GOProud behind" and that GOProud would be dissolved.

== History ==
Jimmy LaSalvia and Christopher R. Barron co-founded GOProud on April 15, 2009. LaSalvia was the Director of Programs and Policy for the Log Cabin Republicans, a gay organization identifying with Republican ideals. Barron was the Political Director at Log Cabin Republicans before both men decided to leave with hopes of a creating a better organization that dealt with more conservative values. They wanted to focus on the issues of the conservative agenda rather than social issues, the focus of Log Cabin Republicans. Barron and LaSalvia believe that same-sex marriage is a state issue and therefore wanted an organization that focused on the real conservative agenda. Margaret Hoover, a member of the advisory council, said "You had this social conservative strategy in terms of trying to get the vote out in states with [marriage amendments]. But the top issues for conservatives were national security and the economy, not gay marriage."

=== 2010 ===
The Conservative Political Action Conference (CPAC), an annual political conference attended by conservative activists and elected officials from across the United States invited GOProud to its 2010 conference. The Family Research Council started a boycott of CPAC over the invitation. Groups that followed the FRC in boycotting included the Concerned Women for America, American Principles Project, Center for Military Readiness, National Organization for Marriage, and Liberty Council. These conservative groups worried that adding gay members would weaken the movement.

During a panel at the 2010 CPAC, Alexander McCobin, co-founder and executive director of Students For Liberty, opened his remarks by thanking the American Conservative Union for welcoming GOProud as a co-sponsor of the event. Ryan Sorba, chairman of the California Young Americans for Freedom and author of The "Born Gay" Hoax, attempted to derail support for GOProud at CPAC. During his speech at the convention, he condemned GOProud for entering the conference but was eventually booed by the audience.

=== 2011 ===
==== Donald Trump's 2011 CPAC speech ====
In February 2011, Trump made his first speaking appearance at the Conservative Political Action Conference. His appearance at CPAC was organized by GOProud, in conjunction with GOProud supporter Roger Stone, who was close with Trump. GOProud pushed for a write-in campaign for Donald Trump at CPAC's presidential straw poll. Christopher R. Barron, co-founder of GOProud who would later not only endorse Trump's 2016 presidential campaign, but also launch LGBT for Trump, said he "would love to see Mr. Trump run for president." The speech was later credited with helping to launch his political career within the Republican Party.

==== "Don't ask, don't tell" ====
"Don't ask, don't tell" was a political issue and policy enacted in 1993. This policy allowed homosexuals to serve in the military as long as their sexual orientation was undisclosed. GOProud supported repealing the policy. GOProud condemned Minnesota Governor Tim Pawlenty and former Pennsylvania Senator Rick Santorum – both candidates for the Republican nomination for president in 2012 – after they favored reinstating the policy.

==== Fabrizio outing ====
Founders LaSalvia, who was also Executive Director, and Barron outed gay pollster and Perry campaign adviser Tony Fabrizio over Rick Perry's "Strong" campaign ad, citing what they viewed as homophobic themes in the ad. The ensuing fallout over the outing caused the late conservative media mogul Andrew Breitbart to resign from GOProud's board.

=== 2012 ===
In July 2011, American Conservative Union's board voted to not allow GOProud to co-sponsor the 2012 CPAC event. This led to controversy among the entities who wanted GOProud to sponsor the event.

=== 2013 ===
==== 2013 CPAC ====
GOProud was once again excluded from sponsoring CPAC in 2013, however this led to some criticism from some, such as S. E. Cupp and Chris Hayes, who boycotted attending CPAC that year over the issue.

==== Leadership change ====
In April 2013, the two co-founders, executive director Jimmy LaSalvia and senior strategist Chris Barron, sold the GOProud name, a computer, a contact list, and some posters to three former interns, and announced plans to step back from their day-to-day roles with the group.

In July 2013, the organization's Board of Directors announced that their new Leadership team consisted of Ross Hemminger, a former aide to US Senator Scott Brown; and Matthew Bechstein, a public relations consultant from California.

=== 2014 ===
==== Founders leave GOProud and 2014 CPAC ====
In January 2014, Jimmy LaSalvia left GOProud and the Republican party and became an independent. This was due to LaSalvia viewing the Republican Party as too bigoted and closed minded towards LGBT people.

In February, founder Chris Barron resigned from GOProud to protest what he called "an unconditional surrender to the forces of bigotry" after the new leaders, including Hemminger, accepted an offer from the organizers of CPAC to allow them to attend the conference as guests, without a booth or other formal presence for GOProud.

==== Dissolution ====
In June 2014, reports surfaced that the GOProud leadership had decided to dissolve the organization. Executive Director Matthew Bechstein issued a denial of the report, stating that it was untrue and that the organization would continue operating as it had. But the following day he admitted that "I posted what I had to on Facebook so I wouldn't scare our members and thwart our fundraising efforts. I wanted to mitigate a disaster." He then stated that GOProud planned to file dissolution papers with the government.

== Political positions ==
According to its website, the top four issues concerning GOProud included "tax reform", "limited government", "freedom-focused foreign policy", and "choices in education".

On January 18, 2013, GOProud came out in support of same-sex marriage at a state by state level. Prior to that, GOProud had no official position on marriage or relationship recognition. In 2011, Ann Coulter said she had convinced GOProud to take its support of same-sex marriage out of its platform.

While GOProud did not have an official position on abortion, GOProud attended anti-abortion rallies and Christopher Barron said that "I want pro-life gays to know they have a home here." Jimmy LaSalvia opposed abortion and warned the gay community should be anti-abortion because of the threat of selective abortions of gay fetuses.

GOProud had no official position on the Employment Nondiscrimination Act or the Matthew Shepard and James Byrd Jr. Hate Crimes Prevention Act. In 2009, GOProud supported the inclusion of the Thune-Vitter Concealed Carry Reciprocity Amendment to the National Defense Authorization Act for Fiscal Year 2010.

== Personnel ==
Gabriel E. Gomez was a director of GOProud.

Ann Coulter was a member of the advisory council beginning on August 9, 2011.

GOProud had affiliates in all 50 states and the District of Columbia. The Metroplex Republicans of Dallas and Right Pride (Nevada affiliate) were affiliated with GOProud.

== See also ==
- GayLib (France)
- Gay Republicans
- LGBT conservatism
- LGBT conservatism in the United States
- LGBTory (Canada)
- LGBT+ Conservatives (United Kingdom)
