= Rebecca McClanahan =

American politician

Member of the Missouri House of Representatives from the 2nd district
- In office January 3, 2007 – January 4, 2011
- Preceded by: Bob Behnen
- Succeeded by: Zachary Wyatt

Personal details
- Born: October 23, 1951 (age 74) Moberly, Missouri
- Party: Democratic
- Spouse: Marvin McClanahan
- Profession: Nurse

Rebecca McClanahan is a former Democratic Representative of the second district of the Missouri House of Representatives, including parts of Putnam, Sullivan, and Adair counties. She was defeated in the 2010 general election by Zachary Wyatt. McClanahan is a lifelong nurse and educator. In 2012 she ran as a Democratic candidate for the newly created Missouri House 3rd district, but was defeated by Republican and former state representative Nate Walker.

== Political career ==
During the 94th General Assembly regular session, McClanahan sponsored House Bill 627, which "requires the installation of carbon monoxide detection devices in certain residential properties." This bill received a hearing in the House Committee on Crime Prevention and Public Safety, but was not passed. This bill was filed again in 2008. Rebecca McClanahan also cosponsored over 30 other bills and one proposed constitutional amendment.

=== 2008 ===
McClanahan was challenged for her seat by Greentop resident Thom Van Vleck, whom she defeated by 1,457 votes. The 2008 race was remarkable for the large sum of money spent.

=== 2010 ===
McClanahan was defeated for the 2nd district seat by United States Air Force veteran, Zachary Wyatt of Novinger. Wyatt is a former intern for United States Senator Kit Bond. The 2010 campaign was remarkable for the robocalls placed into the district. The calls displayed on Caller ID as originating from the Adair County Ambulance District, however District officials disavowed the calls. McClanahan's campaign speculated the calls originated from Wyatt and his "anonymous supporters". Wyatt and his campaign denied any prior knowledge of the calls and condemned them, describing them as "back-room politics" and further called on McClanahan "to apologize for her false accusations.". Later Wyatt said: "I knew my team was not behind it and I believe the voters of the district knew that was not my style and they really didn't pay attention to that information because they knew I would never do anything like that, and I wouldn't." Evidence later showed that the Missouri State Republican Party was responsible for the robocalls and paid Survey St. Louis LLC $2,135.25 for the service. The donation was listed in support of Zachary Wyatt. Similar purchases were made by the Missouri Republican Party in support of four other State Representative candidates: John W. Cauthorn, Jay Houghton, Craig Redmon, and Lindell Shumake

=== 2012 ===
Following Zachary Wyatt's withdrawal from the race for the newly created Missouri House 3rd District in April, 2012, McClanahan announced her intent to seek the position and return to state government. She was unopposed in the August, 2012 Democratic primary. Controversy over the use of mail advertising arose in the days leading up to the November general election. McClanahan felt that mailers sent out on behalf of her opponent, Nate Walker, by the House Republican Campaign Committee and the Missouri Republican State Committee unfairly portrayed her position on issues and voting record. McClanahan's campaign was also accused of unauthorized usage of a likeness and quote in one of her mailers. Retired Marine Corps Major Duane Crawford, a well-known Republican and popular former teacher/coach from Unionville, Missouri, claimed that McClanahan did not have authorization to recycle his image and a quote he gave when he supported McClanahan in her 2008 campaign for the Missouri House 2nd District seat. Said Crawford "I am very upset about this situation. I did not give her express permission." and "When I saw it (the mailer) I was completely shocked. I was embarrassed." Crawford said he told a McClanahan campaign worker that he wanted nothing to do with politics in 2012. However McClanahan said she was never informed of the request, and issued a public apology to Crawford. On November 6, 2012, McClanahan suffered her second straight defeat as she lost to Republican Nate Walker by over 2,000 votes.

== Personal life ==
Rebecca Payne McClanahan lives in Kirksville, Missouri, with her husband Marvin, a retired long-time radio host at KIRX and KTUF. They have two sons, Andrew and Bryan. Andrew lives in Alabama with his wife Astrid, and Bryan lives in Columbia, Missouri. She was born October 23, 1951, in Moberly, Missouri. She was a professor of nursing at Truman State University and a mental health nursing consultant. She taught at Truman for over 30 years, after graduating from Northeast Missouri State University, which is now Truman, with her Bachelor of Science in Nursing in 1975. She went on to earn her Master's degree in Nursing from the University of Missouri in 1982 and then her Doctoral Candidacy at the University of Kansas. Following her defeat in the 2010 election, McClanahan took a position in early 2011 as director of Missouri Healthcare for All, a lobbyist group for healthcare reform and other health issues.

== Electoral history ==
Missouri 3rd District State Representative Election 2012
Party	Candidate	Votes	%	±%
Republican	Nate Walker	8,298	57.4	Winner
Democratic	Rebecca McClanahan	6,156	42.6	

Missouri 2nd District State Representative Election 2010
Party	Candidate	Votes	%	±%
Republican	Zachary Wyatt	6,794	60.6	Winner
Democratic	Rebecca McClanahan	4,423	39.4	

Missouri 2nd District State Representative Election 2008
Party	Candidate	Votes	%	±%
Republican	Thom Van Vleck	7,169	45.4	
Democratic	Rebecca McClanahan	8,626	54.6	Winner

Missouri 2nd District State Representative Election 2006
Party	Candidate	Votes	%	±%
Republican	Nancy Summers	5,674	49.3	
Democratic	Rebecca McClanahan	5,825	50.7	Winner

Political offices
Preceded by Bob Behnen	2nd District Representative to Missouri House of Representatives; 2007 – 2011	Succeeded by Zachary Wyatt
