= J. Eggleston =

American politician

Member of the Missouri House of Representatives from the 2nd district
- In office 2015–2023
- Preceded by: Casey Guernsey
- Succeeded by: Mazzie Boyd

Personal details
- Born: 1966 (age 59–60) DeKalb County, Missouri, U.S.
- Party: Republican
- Spouse: Cathie
- Children: 2
- Profession: Businessman

John Eggleston III (born 1966) is an American politician. He is a former member of the Missouri House of Representatives from the 2nd District, first elected in 2014. He is a member of the Republican Party. He was term-limited in 2022 and could not run for reelection to the Missouri House, so he filed to run for Missouri Senate District 12.

== Electoral history ==
=== State Representative ===
- J. Eggleston was unopposed in his first Republican primary election in 2014.

Missouri House of Representatives election, District 2, November 4, 2014
Party	Candidate	Votes	%	±%
Republican	J. Eggleston	5,785	69.16%	−8.83
Democratic	Mike Waltemath	2,580	30.84%	+8.83

Missouri House of Representatives primary election, District 2, August 2, 2016
Party	Candidate	Votes	%	±%
Republican	J. Eggleston	4,587	81.52%	−18.48
Republican	Homer Lee Curtis	1,040	18.42%	N/A

Missouri House of Representatives election, District 2, November 8, 2016
Party	Candidate	Votes	%	±%
Republican	J. Eggleston	13,342	100.00%	+30.84

Missouri House of Representatives primary election, District 2, August 7, 2018
Party	Candidate	Votes	%	±%
Republican	J. Eggleston	5,062	80.40%	−1.12
Republican	Amy Bobcock	1,234	19.60%	N/A

Missouri House of Representatives election, District 2, November 6, 2018
Party	Candidate	Votes	%	±%
Republican	J. Eggleston	10,741	100.00%	0.00

Missouri House of Representatives election, District 2, November 3, 2020
Party	Candidate	Votes	%	±%
Republican	J. Eggleston	12,838	83.12%	−16.88
Democratic	Mindi Smith	2,607	16.88%	+16.88
