= Jeremy Mosley =

American politician

Member-elect of the Missouri House of Representatives from the 3rd district
- Assuming office January 6, 2027
- Succeeding: Danny Busick

Personal details
- Party: Republican

P. Jeremy Mosley is an American politician of the Missouri Republican Party who is the representative-elect for the 3rd district in the Missouri House of Representatives. He was elected in the 2026 general election. Mosley is a former official with the United States Department of Agriculture. He is a fifth-generation farmer.
