= Christopher R. Barron =

American political activist (born 1973)

- Born: December 15, 1973 (age 52); Maine, United States
- Education: University of North Carolina at Greensboro; East Carolina University; Wake Forest University School of Law
- Occupations: Political consulting, political strategist, and lawyer
- Political party: Republican
- Spouse: Shawn R. Gardner

Christopher R. Barron (born December 15, 1973) is an American political activist best known as the cofounder of GOProud, a political organization representing gay conservatives. He is the president of CapSouth Consulting, a political consulting firm, and previously the organizer of LGBT for Trump and the national political director for Log Cabin Republicans, where he directed the organization's federal lobbying efforts and media relations.

== Early life and education ==
Christopher Barron was born in Maine, and raised in Goldsboro, North Carolina. Barron graduated from Eastern Wayne High School and studied as an undergrad at the University of North Carolina at Greensboro and East Carolina University. He served vice president of the College Republicans and president of his fraternity while studying political science at the East Carolina University. During his senior year a fraternity brother "outed" Barron, who at the time was in a relationship with his chapter law adviser. Barron moved out of the fraternity house that night, fearful of the hostile reaction his fraternity brothers might have, once his secret spread. Barron came out to his family before graduating from college in 1997. He enrolled at Wake Forest University School of Law a few months later. Barron graduated with honors from Wake Forest University School of Law, where he was a member of Wake Forest Law Review and was the Wake Law Faculty Scholar.

== Political activism ==
Barron joined the Log Cabin Republicans as political director in February 2004. He was instrumental in the organization's September 2004 decision to not endorse President George W. Bush's re-election. In a 2004 interview, he revealed that in 2003 he submitted a written testimonial praising Democratic presidential candidate John Edwards on a web site and that he supported Edwards' 1998 U.S. Senate campaign.

In 2006, Barron founded CapSouth Consulting, where his clients included Pharmaceutical Research and Manufacturers of America (PhRMA), the Republican National Committee, the Republican Main Street Partnership, and the National Republican Congressional Committee.

In 2009, Barron and Jimmy LaSalvia both found GOProud and left the Log Cabin Republicans. This was in direct result to both of them viewing the Log Cabin Republicans as too centrist.

Before the 2012 Republican primary, Barron helped organize the "Draft Cheney 2012" movement, which was to convince the former vice president Cheney to seek the Republican presidential nomination in 2012. Early in the 2012 Republican primary process, Barron endorsed Herman Cain for the 2012 U.S. presidential election. After Cain dropped out, Barron endorsed Republican and later Libertarian Party presidential candidate Gary Johnson for the 2012 U.S. presidential election. He was a delegate to the 2012 Libertarian National Convention. In the 2012 Republican primary in the District of Columbia, Barron voted for Ron Paul. In October 2012, however, he announced he had decided to support and vote for Mitt Romney for president, even while continuing to serve as a D.C. elector for Johnson.

On February 19, 2014, Barron left GOProud after Conservative Political Action Conference (CPAC) invited GOProud to attend the 2014 CPAC. In an interview with BuzzFeed, Barron said, "Last night I resigned from the Board of GOProud, the organization that I co-founded back in April of 2009. I cannot in good conscience sit by and watch as the current leadership of the organization disingenuously pawns off an unconditional surrender to the forces of bigotry as some sort of 'compromise,'" and "Nothing has changed in regards to GOProud and CPAC, GOProud does not have a booth, they are not a sponsor, they are not participating in any formal sense—individual members can attend and that's exactly the terms ACU dictated the previous few years."

Previously a Never Trump Republican, he later endorsed and voted for Donald Trump in the 2016 United States presidential election, along with organizing LGBT for Trump.

=== Political views ===
Barron is a conservative, libertarian, and registered Republican.

Barron supports same-sex marriage, including being in a same-sex marriage himself. He said about the issue of marriage that "I opposed the federal marriage amendment because I do not believe we should federalize marriage," and "Marriage is and always has been a state issue. The last thing I want is for some federal court to impose a tortured Roe v. Wade law on gay marriage that will make sure that this issue is never resolved."

On the issue of the Employment Non-Discrimination Act he said that "We believe it isn't the proper role of a limited federal government and that it is a solution in search of a problem. The truth is that the private industry has been way ahead on protections and benefits for gay and lesbian Americans."

He supported the inclusion of the Thune–Vitter Concealed Carry Reciprocity Amendment to the National Defense Authorization Act for Fiscal Year 2010.

Barron supports non-interventionist foreign policy and suggested to Mitt Romney, before his foreign policy president debate with Obama, that in order to win over libertarian voters he should stress ending the war on Afghanistan, support ending foreign aid to countries like Libya and Egypt, oppose sending US ground troops into Syria, US foreign policy won't be dictated by the UN, and make clear difference between Romney's foreign policy views and that of George W. Bush's foreign policy views. He had previously criticized Michael Steele in 2010 for his comments that the war in Afghanistan is Obama's war of choice.

Barron had previously held pro-choice views and worked for Planned Parenthood for two months and described the experience as "Worst 2 months of my life... Want to convert pro-choicers to the pro-life cause? Make them work at Planned Parenthood." He also said he stopped supporting the Roe v. Wade decision in early 2006, after this experience, "but beyond that don't have strong feelings on abortion – not really involved in the process." In February 2011, Barron responded to Tim Pawlenty calling for defunding the repeal of Don't Ask Don't Tell, by stating that he would be better served talking about the need to defund Planned Parenthood and end federal funding for abortion. He stated that "I want pro-life gays to know they have a home here."

Barron has called President Trump's purposed ban on transgender individuals from serving in the United States military as "unwise".

After The New York Times tweeted a cartoon portraying Trump and Putin as a gay couple, Barron said: "This is exactly what they think of gay people - that our lives and our relationships are jokes...Most middle school children behave better than this."

== Career ==
During his legal career, Barron served as a consultant to the litigation boutique firm of Watson & Renner, in Washington, D.C. At Watson & Renner, he worked on a variety of legal issues, including a number of corporate governance and toxic tort issues. Previously, he was an associate at the law firm of Powell, Goldstein, Frazer & Murphy in Atlanta, Georgia, where he was a member of the Business & Financial Institutions Litigation Group.

Barron is currently Vice President of Public Relations at International Health Brands and The Wellness Company, as well as CEO of Vigilant News Network.

== Personal life ==
Barron lives in Washington, D.C., with his husband Shawn R. Gardner, to whom he has been legally married since 2010. He has stated that he served in the Air Force Reserve. Barron has written numerous opinion pieces for The Washington Post, The Huffington Post, The Boston Globe, Roll Call, The Hill, Politico, TheBlaze, The Daily Caller, and United Liberty. He has appeared on numerous national and local television channels, including MSNBC, NBC, CBS, CNN, CNN Headline News, ABC News Now, and Fox News, including being a frequent guest on Red Eye w/ Greg Gutfeld and Gutfeld!.
