= Gay Voter's League =

Gay Voter's League of San Francisco is a defunct political organization of LGBT Americans who campaigned for both Republican and Democratic candidates.

In 1971 former members of San Francisco's Gay Activists Alliance, headed by Reverend Ray Broshears, formed the Gay Voters' League. The group sought to include conservative candidates, which put it at odds with other LGBT political organizations at the time. In 1972, the group campaigned for the re-election of President Richard Nixon and for seven other candidates (four Republicans and three Democrats). In October 1972, representative of the Committee to Re-elect the President addressed gay voters on behalf of Richard M. Nixon's campaign in San Francisco. The Gay Voters League was active through 1981.
