= Gay Republicans =

2004 television documentary film

- Directed by: Wash Westmoreland
- Starring: Maurice Bonamigo; Terry Hamilton; Mark Harris; Steve May; Carol Newman
- Narrated by: Pamala Tyson
- Country of origin: United States
- Original language: English

Production
- Running time: 63 minutes

Original release
- Release: 2004

Gay Republicans is a 2004 television documentary film directed by Wash Westmoreland that focuses on four Log Cabin Republicans as they struggle with President George W. Bush's unequivocal opposition to gay marriage and are forced to make a choice: Whether to be good Republicans and support the President, or stand up for their civil rights as gay Americans. This decision afforded them a historic opportunity to affect the 2004 presidential election, but it also opens schisms that threatens the unity of the Log Cabin itself.

== Plot ==
The documentary looks at the lives and opinions of several gay members of the US Republican Party, including:

- Maurice Bonamigo, a Palm Beach hairstylist who was a strong supporter of George W. Bush and his policies
- Carol Newman, an attorney from Los Angeles who has proposed to her life partner
- Steve May, a former state legislator who comments on perceived changes to the party over time
- Mark Harris, a gay rights activist with strong opinions on both sides of the debate

== Cast ==
- Maurice Bonamigo - as himself
- Terry Hamilton - as himself
- Mark Harris - as himself
- Steve May - as himself
- Carol Newman - as herself
- Carla Halbrook - as herself

== Critical reception ==
The Advocate described the documentary as "fairly straightforward - and often funny" but noted that "for all the fascinating characters rushing across the screen, the film never digs deeper than its occasionally shocking surface." In its review, Variety looked at the politics of the participants and said "without seemingly intending to, Westmoreland's film offers a view of how the GOP outgunned the Democrats in 2004 and marginalized all opposition within party ranks." The Hartford Courant said that the "film shows gay Republicans have characters as diverse as any other Republicans. They range from a calm, reasonable, same-sex-married lesbian to a Bill O'Reilly clone who spews disdain and screams 'shut up' when the discussion turns against his viewpoints."

== Awards ==
- 2004 Best Documentary prize at the AFI Fest

== See also ==
- Log Cabin Republicans
- GOProud
