= Deplorable Pride =

Conservative LGBT organization

- Named after: Basket of deplorables LGBT pride
- Formation: June 6, 2017; 9 years ago
- Founder: Brian Talbert; Derek Van Cleve
- Type: LGBT conservative
- Location: Albemarle, North Carolina, United States
- Leader: Brian Talbert

Deplorable Pride is a conservative LGBT organization in Albemarle, North Carolina, that supports Donald Trump. It has been described as "alt-right."

== History ==
Deplorable Pride was founded on June 6, 2017 by Brian Talbert and Derek Van Cleve, as a group of LGBT Trump supporters who wanted a float in the Charlotte Pride Parade, which it was denied. Charlotte Pride said they denied the group's participation because of Deplorable Pride's anti-LGBT and other views which did not comport with its mission. GLAAD also criticized Deplorable Pride's views, calling it a "fringe alt-right" group and highlighting several hostile statements from the organization, including comments by Deplorable Pride leader Brian Talbert that he would kill "every single" Muslim and several other statements using slurs and profanities to refer to LGBT people and Muslims.

On July 26, 2017, Deplorable Pride supported President Trump's announcement that he would be banning transgender individuals from military service in the United States Army. On May 12, 2018, Talbert was arrested and charged with assault on a woman during an altercation with counter-protesters. Talbert has supported the Proud Boys and said that Hillary Clinton should be executed for treason.

As of 2023, Talbert is the North Carolina chapter leader for Gays Against Groomers.

== See also ==
- Alt-lite
- DeploraBall
- Gays for Trump
- LGBT conservatism in the United States
