= Jimmy LaSalvia =

American political figure (born 1970)

- Born: James Michael LaSalvia Jr. 15 December 1970 (age 55); Bowling Green, Kentucky, U.S.
- Education: Black Hills State University
- Occupations: Commentator & speaker, political strategist
- Political party: Independent (2014–present); Republican (until 2014)
- Website: jimmylasalvia.com

Jimmy LaSalvia (born December 15, 1970) is an American political figure. LaSalvia is the co-founder and former executive director of GOProud, a defunct U.S. political action group. He has also done work for the American Civil Liberties Union.

== Early career ==
A long-time political activist, LaSalvia has held volunteer and professional staff positions in Republican campaigns and party organizations in South Dakota and Kentucky, including volunteering on the campaign staff of former South Dakota Governor Walter D. Miller. He has also previously worked as a development officer for Kentucky Opera and as a real estate broker in Louisville, Kentucky.

== Log Cabin Republicans ==
After taking a break from politics, LaSalvia reengaged in response to the anti-gay marriage amendments that appeared on ballots in 11 states and the federal constitutional amendment proposal to ban gay marriage nationally in 2004. He joined NO on the Amendment, a group that opposed the federal anti-gay marriage constitutional amendment. In the same year, he founded the Kentucky chapter of the Log Cabin Republicans .

In 2006, LaSalvia left the Kentucky chapter and joined the national staff of Log Cabin Republicans, first as Grassroots Outreach Director, then as Director of Programs & Policy. He was left the organization in December 2008.

== GOProud ==
LaSalvia left Log Cabin Republicans and along with fellow former LCR employee, Christopher R. Barron started GOProud as a means of driving a political perspective under their sole direction. They co-sponsored CPAC two years in a row and conservative commentator Ann Coulter headlined GOProud's first "Homocon" convention, where Ann Coulter addressed the audience informing them that gays didn't 'deserve civil rights protections because they weren't black.' In advance of the 2012 CPAC, Barron went on a rage against ACU Chairman Al Cardenas and Board Member Cleta Mitchell calling her a 'nasty bigot' despite having developed a working relationship with her in the past, the statements by Barron spurred conservative lesbian radio personality Tammy Bruce to resign from the GOProud board.

As executive director of GOProud, he went on record that he would endorse Michele Bachmann if she received the Republican nomination despite her lengthy anti-gay rhetoric and voting record.

GOProud is an organization for conservative gays and their allies. Barron and LaSalvia founded the organization in April 2009. LaSalvia announced in early 2013 that he would be stepping aside as the executive director of the organization and its daily operations, this coincided with pro-LGBTQ donor Paul Singer terminating his financial support. However, he will remain active with the organization by serving on the board of directors. They have co-sponsored CPAC two years in a row and conservative commentator Ann Coulter headlined GOProud's first "Homocon" convention.

== Switching to Independent ==
In January 2014, LaSalvia left GOProud and re-registered as "No Party (Independent)" on his voting registration.

== Media prominence ==
LaSalvia has appeared on Fox News, Fox Business Network, CNN, MSNBC, and other television networks. He has been quoted in The New York Times, The Wall Street Journal, USA Today, and other newspaper and media outlets. His public speaking engagements have included speeches at Columbia University, Princeton University, Tufts University, George Washington University, Smith College, and other colleges and universities.

== Political views ==
In 2012, LaSalvia, while on the board of directors of GOProud, voted in favor of GOProud endorsing Mitt Romney in the 2012 presidential election. In the November 2013 Virginia gubernatorial election, LaSalvia endorsed Robert Sarvis for governor.

LaSalvia's memoir, No Hope: Why I Left the GOP (and You Should Too) was published in 2015. The book chronicles his evolution to political independence and clarifies his position on some issues, such as abortion, immigration, and others.

After switching party affiliation to independent, LaSalvia endorsed Hillary Clinton in the 2016 presidential election.

== Personal life ==
LaSalvia was born in Bowling Green, Kentucky, and grew up in a well-traveled military family. He is a graduate of Black Hills State University in Spearfish, South Dakota.
