= J. M. Whorton =

American politician

J. M. "Jim" Whorton is the owner of an automobile sales business and a former Democratic member of the Missouri House of Representatives. He resides with his wife, Beverly, in Trenton, Missouri.

He was born in southwestern Grundy County, Missouri, and graduated from Trenton High School. He went on to Trenton Junior College, and received a B.S. degree in agriculture from the University of Missouri. He continued with post-graduate work there and at the University of Minnesota. He also served nine years with the United States Air National Guard and Reserves.

He is a member of the Wesley United Methodist Church, Trenton Masonic Lodge #111, Alpha Gamma Rho fraternity, the Trenton Area Chamber of Commerce, the National Rifle Association of America, the American Legion, the Elks Lodge, and the Missouri and Grundy County Farm Bureaus.

He was first elected to the Missouri House of Representatives in a special election in 2001, and won re-election in 2002, 2004, and 2006. Mr. Whorton was term-limited under Missouri law from running for reelection in 2008.
