= Zachary Wyatt =

American politician

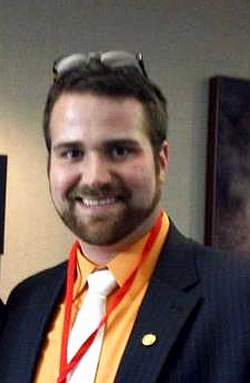

Member of the Missouri House of Representatives from the 2nd district
- In office January 2011 – January 2013
- Preceded by: Rebecca McClanahan
- Succeeded by: Casey Guernsey

Personal details
- Born: October 7, 1984 (age 41) Kirksville, Missouri, U.S.
- Party: Republican
- Spouse(s): David Wyatt-Gomez (divorced 2020); William Bauer (married 2025)
- Education: Community College of the Air Force Creighton University
- Profession: Former U.S. Air Force language specialist

Zachary Wyatt (born October 7, 1984) is an American politician from the state of Missouri. A Republican, Wyatt was a one-term member of the Missouri House of Representatives from the 2nd district, encompassing Adair County, Putnam County, and part of Sullivan County. In May 2012, Wyatt became, at that time, the nation's only openly gay Republican legislator. He came out during a press conference in the Missouri Capitol, while opposing the "Don't Say Gay" bill.

Due to Missouri House redistricting following the 2010 U.S. Census, the 2nd district was divided into two newly numbered districts. Wyatt had originally filed to run for the 3rd district, which includes most of his former 2nd district territory. However, in early April 2012 he announced his intention to withdraw once a suitable Republican replacement could be named. Wyatt stated his withdrawal was prompted by his acceptance into a marine biology program at the University of Hawaii, and his desire to take full advantage of his veterans education benefits. In the November general election Republican Nate Walker defeated Democrat Rebecca McClanahan, Wyatt's opponent in 2010, to win the 3rd district seat and succeed Wyatt.

== Personal life ==
Zachary Wyatt was born October 7, 1984, in Kirksville, Missouri, to parents Randall "Randy" Wyatt and Frances "Fran" Wyatt (née Quint). He has one sibling, older brother Nicholas Wyatt, a U.S. Navy veteran. Raised in rural western Adair County, Wyatt graduated from Adair County R-1 High School in Novinger, Missouri, in 2003. Following graduation, he enlisted in the United States Air Force, serving until March 2010. While in the USAF, Wyatt earned an Associate of Arts degree in information technology from the Community College of the Air Force, as well as an Associate of Arts degree in Russian language and a Chechen translating certificate from the Defense Language Institute. While in the Air Force Wyatt also served as an airborne Russian/Chechen/Ukrainian linguist on RC-135 and C-130 aircraft monitoring communications.

== Political life ==
Zachary Wyatt developed an interest in politics as a teen, an interest that was further enhanced when he had the opportunity to serve as a legislative intern for Missouri United States Senator Christopher "Kit" Bond in 2007. According to Wyatt: "It was at this time I first realized my call in life was to serve Missouri through politics."

Despite not having run for or held public office before, Wyatt declared his candidacy for Missouri's 2nd District State Representative. In an election upset, Wyatt defeated two-term incumbent Representative Rebecca McClanahan by a margin of 60.6% to 39.4% In addition to the state legislature, Wyatt was also elected president of Novinger Renewal in 2010. Novinger Renewal is a community betterment group working for the historic preservation and revitalization of Novinger, Missouri.

== Legislative Assignments ==
Representative Wyatt serves on the Veterans, International Trade and Job Creation, Special Standing Committee on Renewable Energy, and Agri-Business committees. Wyatt also serves as vice-chair of the Rural Communities Development Committee. Summer 2011, Representative Wyatt was appointed to the Joint Committee on Urban Agriculture. He also will serve on the Missouri Arts Trust Board.

=== 2011 Legislative Session ===
Representative Wyatt sponsored 14 pieces of legislation in the session. The bills dealt with economic development, veterans, education, and lower taxes. Three of the bills were signed into law.

=== 2012 Legislative session ===
Among the bills introduced during the session by Representative Wyatt were legislation to establish renewable energy in Missouri state parks, changes allowing more freedom in living arrangements for the developmentally disabled, and a constitutional amendment altering the state's judicial commission.

==== Wyatt vs. Judge Steele ====
One key piece of legislation was HR 333 sponsored by Representative Wyatt. The resolution called for the impeachment of Missouri Circuit Judge Russel E. Steele, the first such action in Missouri since 1968. The impeachment is based on allegations of possible judicial misconduct, willful neglect of duties as a jurist, and official corruption. The resolution received bipartisan support, being co-sponsored by Representatives Andrew Koenig (R), Paul Curtman (R), and Sylvester Taylor (D). In response to HR 333, Steele issued a press release stating "I trust that the media and the people will see this effort for what it truly is, politics at its worst" and that the Missouri Commission on the Retirement, Removal, and Discipline of Judges, as well as an Adair County grand jury, had already investigated the charges in 2006. The resolution was forwarded to the House Judiciary Committee but no further action was taken.

==== "Don't Say Gay" bill ====
In April and May 2012 Representative Wyatt expressed deep opposition to Missouri House Bill 2051, commonly known as the "Don't Say Gay" bill. The bill would put strict limits on the discussion of sexual orientation in Missouri schools, limiting it only to classes on health and sexual reproduction. The bill gained nationwide attention from various news outlets and The Colbert Report. On May 2, 2012, Wyatt held a press conference at the Missouri State Capitol outlining his opposition. During the course of the event he read a statement announcing that he was gay. The revelation meant that Wyatt is the only currently-serving gay Republican legislator in the United States, something addressed in a May 3, 2012 interview on the MSNBC program The Last Word with Lawrence O'Donnell. Asked by O'Donnell why he was a Republican, considering the party's stance on LGBT issues Wyatt replied "I'm not a one-issue person" and that he is a firm believer in a balanced budget and small government.

== Electoral history ==
Missouri 2nd District State Representative Election 2010
Party	Candidate	Votes	%	±%
Republican	Zachary Wyatt	6,794	60.6	Winner
Democratic	Rebecca McClanahan	4,423	39.4	
