= Anabel, Missouri =

Unincorporated community in Missouri, U.S.

Coordinates: 39°44′45″N 92°20′00″W

Anabel is an unincorporated community in eastern Macon County, Missouri, United States. It is located on U.S. Route 36, approximately seven miles east of Macon.

== History ==
Variant names given to Anabel were "Beverly" and "Round Grove". A post office called Round Grove was established in 1869, and the name was changed to Beverley in 1870. It was changed once again to Anabel in 1889, and the post office subsequently closed in 1999. The present name of Anabel was derived from the name of the daughter of a local storekeeper, according to local history.

In 1925, Anabel had 63 inhabitants.
