= Employment Non-Discrimination Act =

Legislation proposed in the United States Congress

The Employment Non-Discrimination Act (ENDA) is legislation proposed in the United States Congress that would prohibit discrimination in hiring and employment on the basis of sexual orientation or, depending on the version of the bill, gender identity, by employers with at least 15 employees.

ENDA has been introduced in every Congress since 1994 except the 109th. Similar legislation has been introduced without passage since 1974. The bill gained its best chance at passing after the Democratic Party gained the majority after twelve years of Republican majorities in the 2006 midterm elections. In 2007, gender identity protections were added to the legislation for the first time. Some sponsors believed that even with a Democratic majority, ENDA did not have enough votes to pass the House of Representatives with transgender inclusion and dropped it from the bill, which passed the House and then died in the Senate. President George W. Bush threatened to veto the measure. LGBT advocacy organizations and the LGBT community were divided over support of the modified bill.

In 2009, following Democratic gains in the 2008 elections, and after the divisiveness of the 2007 debate, Rep. Barney Frank introduced a transgender-inclusive version of ENDA. He introduced it again in 2011, and Senator Jeff Merkley introduced it in the Senate. On November 7, 2013, Merkley's bill passed the Senate with bipartisan support by a vote of 64–32. President Barack Obama supported the bill's passage, but the House Rules Committee voted against it.

From 2015 on, LGBT rights advocates moved to support the Equality Act, a bill with far more comprehensive protections than ENDA. The Equality Act would prohibit discrimination on the basis of sexual orientation and gender identity not only in employment, but also housing, public accommodations, public education, federal funding, credit, and jury service.

On June 15, 2020, the Supreme Court ruled in Bostock v. Clayton County that Title VII of the Civil Rights Act of 1964 protects employees from discrimination based on their sexual orientation and gender identity. The ruling was only on employment, like ENDA. LGBT rights advocates welcomed the ruling and called on Congress to pass the Equality Act, noting that as of 2020, 29 states do not have the full protections the Equality Act would provide for the LGBT community.

== Evidence of employment discrimination on the basis of sexual orientation and gender identity ==
In states that have anti-discrimination policies in place, LGBT complaints are equivalent to the number of complaints filed based on sex and fewer than the number of complaints filed based on race. EEOC statistics from 2018 show that 1,811 LGBT complaints were filed.

The Williams Institute estimates the number of LGBT employees as follows: 7 million private sector employees, 1 million state and local employees, and 200,000 employees of the federal government. Thirty percent of state and local LGBT employees live in California and New York. In comparison, less than half of one half of one percent of LGBT state and local employees live in Montana, North Dakota and Wyoming combined. As one might expect, many of the documented complaints of discrimination by state and local governments against LGBT employees are in California and New York. Surveys that seek to document discrimination on the basis of perceived sexual orientation and/or gender identity are often conducted with a pool of self identified LGBT people, making it difficult to ascertain the impact of this type of discrimination on non-LGBT individuals.

One source of evidence for hiring discrimination against openly gay men comes from a field experiment that sent two fictitious but realistic resumes to roughly 1,700 entry-level job openings. The two resumes were very similar in terms of the applicant's qualifications, but one resume for each opening mentioned that the applicant had been part of a gay organization in college. The results showed that applicants without the gay signal had an 11.5 percent chance of being called for an interview; openly gay applicants had only a 7.2 percent chance. The callback gap varied widely according to the location of the job. Most of the overall gap detected in the study was driven by the Southern and Midwestern states in the sample – Texas, Florida, and Ohio. The Western and Northeastern states in the sample (California, Nevada, Pennsylvania, and New York) had only small and statistically insignificant callback gaps.

Transgender people may experience higher rates of discrimination than the LGB population. A survey of transgender and gender non-conforming people conducted by the National Center for Transgender Equality found 90 percent of respondents experienced harassment, mistreatment, or discrimination on the job or took actions like hiding who they are to avoid it. In comparison, a review of studies conducted by the Williams Institute in 2007 found that transgender people experienced employment discrimination at a rate of between 15 and 57 percent of the population.

In a survey conducted by Harris Interactive, 38 percent of LGBT people report incomes less than $35,000, compared to 33 percent of all U.S. adults over age 18.

== Provisions ==
The current version of the bill under consideration in Congress prohibits private employers with more than 15 employees from discriminating on the basis of some sexual orientations or gender identity. Sexual orientation is limited to "homosexuality, heterosexuality, or bisexuality," thereby legalizing discrimination against asexual individuals. Religious organizations are provided an exception, broader than that found in the Civil Rights Act of 1964. Non-profit membership-only clubs, except labor unions, are similarly exempt.

All versions of the bill, irrespective of the military's changing policies with respect to service by open gays and lesbians, have provided an exclusion for the military as an employer of members of the armed forces, though not as an employer of civilians.

Since the 111th Congress, the legislation has included language to prevent any reading of the law as a modification of the federal definition of marriage established in the Defense of Marriage Act (1995). Since the 110th Congress, a related provision aimed at non-marital legal relations like civil unions and domestic partnerships prevents requiring an employer to treat unmarried and married couples similarly.

== Legislative activity ==
Senate vote on Employment Nondiscrimination Act of 1996. Both yes One yes, one didn't vote One yes, one no Both no

On May 14, 1974, Reps. Bella Abzug (D-NY) and Ed Koch (D-NY) introduced H.R. 14752, an "Equality Act" which would have added "sex, marital status or sexual orientation" to the protected classes specified in the Civil Rights Act of 1964, thus prohibiting discrimination in employment and access to public accommodations and facilities. The bill died in June 1974 but a similarly named bill would later be introduced in the 115th United States Congress on May 2, 2017.

In the early 1990s, supporters of the legislation decided to focus on employment. Rep. Gerry Studds introduced the Employment Non-Discrimination Act on June 23, 1994. The legislation failed in 1994 and 1995. In 1996, the bill failed on a 49–50 vote in the Senate and was not voted on in the House. Massachusetts Senator Edward Kennedy "believed that other senators looking for 'cover' on their vote in favor of DOMA might be more inclined to support ENDA." Early versions of ENDA did not include provisions to protect transgender people from discrimination and ENDA was not introduced in the 109th Congress.

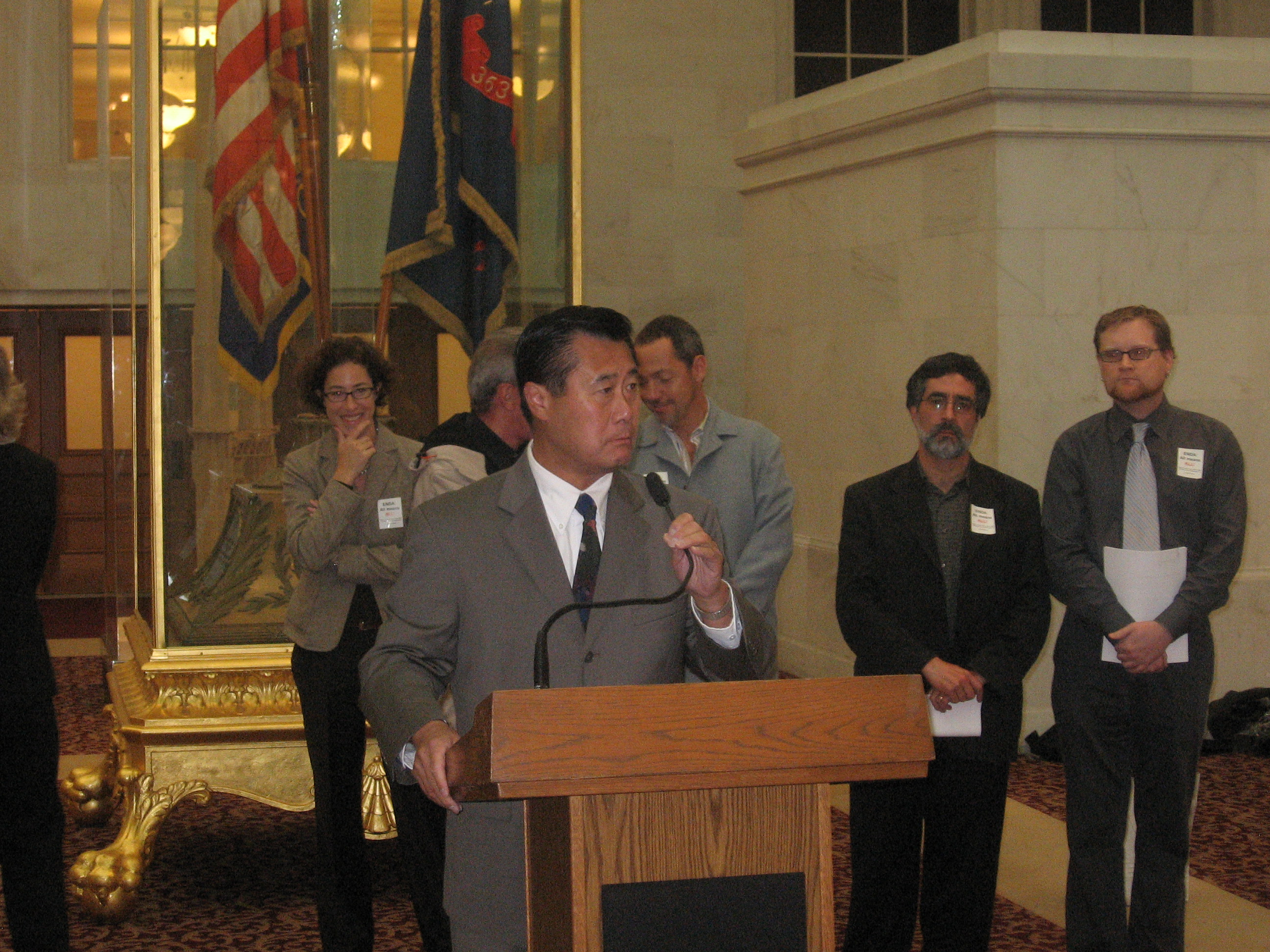
The "United ENDA" coalition protests the removal of gender identity from the 2007 bill at San Francisco City Hall.

=== 110th Congress ===
House vote on Sexual Orientation Employment Nondiscrimination Act of 2007 by congressional district. Democratic aye Republican aye Abstention or no representative seated Democratic no Republican no

In the 110th United States Congress there were two versions of the bill, both of which provided employment protections similar to Title VII of the Civil Rights Act of 1964. Reps. Barney Frank, Chris Shays, Tammy Baldwin, and Deborah Pryce introduced H.R. 2015 on April 24, 2007. It included gender identity within its protections. It defined gender identity as "gender-related identity, appearance, or mannerisms or other gender-related characteristics of an individual, with or without regard to the individual's designated sex at birth." It allowed employers to require adherence "to the same dress or grooming standards for the gender to which the employee has transitioned or is transitioning."

When that bill died in committee, Frank split it into two, both of which he introduced on September 27, 2007. H.R. 3685 did not include gender identity, and it exempted employer dress codes. H.R. 3686, was specifically for gender identity. The bill for sexual orientation had one successful vote. With the October 18 endorsement of the Education and Labor Committee, the House of Representatives passed it on November 7 by a vote of 235–184 (with 14 members not voting), but it died in the Senate. The bill for gender identity, by contrast, never went to a vote.

Some LGBT activist organizations refused to support H.R. 3685 because of its failure to cover gender identity. An exception was the Human Rights Campaign, which received wide criticism from the LGBT community for supporting a non-inclusive ENDA. The LGBT activist organizations that refused to support H.R. 3685 argued that not including transgender people undermined the underlying principle of ENDA. They claimed that failure to include gender identity/expression weakened the protection for the portion of the LGBT population that most needed its protections: gender non-conforming people, who they claimed are discriminated against in greater numbers than their gender-conforming compatriots. Moreover, groups such as the National LGBTQ Task Force, among others, later withdrew support in 2014 due to the ENDA's broad religious exemptions. Others argued that this was ENDA's best chance of passing Congress in thirty years, that civil rights victories have historically been incremental, that concerns about the legislation's protections were unfounded, and that forgoing a chance to provide immediate workplace protections to millions of lesbians, gays and bisexuals was politically and morally wrong.

=== 111th Congress ===
On June 24, 2009, Frank introduced H.R. 3017 to ban workplace discrimination based on sexual orientation and gender identity, with 114 original cosponsors, up from 62 cosponsors for the trans-inclusive bill of 2007." The lead Republican cosponsor was Rep. Ileana Ros-Lehtinen (R-FL). Republican Main Street Partnership members Mark Kirk (R-IL), Mike Castle (R-DE), Todd Russell Platts (R-PA), Judy Biggert (R-IL), and Leonard Lance (R-NJ) were among the original cosponsors. The bill was referred to the House Education and Labor Committee, which held a hearing on the legislation on September 23, 2009. At the end of the 111th Congress, H.R. 3017 had 203 cosponsors in the House.

On August 5, 2009, Sen. Jeff Merkley introduced ENDA legislation (S. 1584) that included gender identity, with 38 original cosponsors including Sens. Ted Kennedy (D-MA), Susan Collins (R-ME), Olympia Snowe (R-ME) and Chris Dodd (D-CT). Sen. Merkley said "It's certainly possible that this could be passed by year's end, though the [congressional] schedule is very crowded."

The U.S. Senate Health, Education, Labor, and Pensions (HELP) Committee held a hearing on the legislation on November 5, 2009. Before the hearing, Sen. Merkley spoke at a press conference alongside two transgender women, Diane Schroer and Earline Budd. However, no transgender witnesses testified at the Senate hearing. As of March 13, 2010, S. 1584 had 45 co-sponsors and was pending before the HELP committee.

=== 112th Congress ===
On April 6, 2011, Frank introduced an ENDA bill (H.R. 1397) in the House to ban workplace discrimination based on sexual orientation and gender identity.

On April 14, 2011, Sen. Jeff Merkley introduced an ENDA bill (S. 811) in the Senate. The bill had 39 original cosponsors. On June 19, 2012, the Senate Committee on Health, Education, Labor & Pensions held a hearing on the bill, the first such hearing to include testimony by a transgender witness.

Senate vote on the Employment Non-Discrimination Act of 2013. Both yes One yes, one didn't vote One yes, one no One no, one didn't vote Both no

=== 113th Congress ===
On April 25, 2013, Representative Jared Polis (D-CO) introduced an ENDA bill in the House (H.R. 1755) and Senator Jeff Merkley (D-OR) introduced an ENDA bill in the Senate (S. 815).

On July 10, 2013, the Senate Health, Education, Labor & Pensions Committee approved ENDA by a 15–7 vote. Senator Lamar Alexander (R-TN) announced he would offer three amendments when the Senate takes up the measure.

A cloture vote succeeded in the Senate on November 4, 2013, with 61 voting in favor and 30 against, allowing the Senate to schedule a vote. Republican Senators Kelly Ayotte (NH), Susan Collins (ME), Orrin Hatch (UT), Dean Heller (NV), Mark Kirk (IL), Rob Portman (OH), and Pat Toomey (PA) voted for cloture, joining 52 of 53 Democratic senators and both independent senators. Senators Claire McCaskill (D-MO) and Lisa Murkowski (R-AK) supported the legislation, but were unable to attend the cloture vote.

After rejecting by a vote of 43–55 an amendment by Senator Toomey to expand the religious exemptions and accepting by unanimous voice vote an amendment by Senator Portman to prevent government retaliation against religious institutions, the Senate approved ENDA on November 7, 2013, on a 64–32 vote. Arizona Republicans Jeff Flake and John McCain unexpectedly joined Sen. Murkowski and the seven Republicans who had supported three days earlier. Both independents and 52 of 53 Democrats again supported the measure, with McCaskill present but Pennsylvania Senator Bob Casey, who supported the bill's passage, absent.

In the House, on September 17, 2014, Representative Polis filed a discharge petition, that, if signed by a majority of the House membership, would force a vote on the version of ENDA with a narrow religious exemption. By September 22, it had been endorsed by 190 of the 218 that constitute a majority. On December 3, 2014, 6 of the 8 Republican co-sponsors asked House Speaker John Boehner to allow a vote on the legislation "as part of any available legislative vehicle including the National Defense Authorization Act" before the end of the 113th Congress. Later that day, the House Rules Committee voted 7 to 3 against adding ENDA as an amendment to the 2015 defense authorization bill.

=== 114th Congress onwards ===
From the 114th Congress onwards, efforts to pass non-discrimination legislation has focused on the broader Equality Act which focuses on additional protections including in housing and the jury system as well as employment.

== Arguments ==
=== In favor of ENDA ===
Political proponents of the law intend it to address cases where gay, lesbian, bisexual, and transgender employees have been discriminated against by their employers because of their sexual orientation or gender identity. Currently, these employees are unable to find protection in the courts because sexual orientation is not considered to be a suspect class by the federal courts and by many U.S. states. Proponents argue that such a law is appropriate in light of the United States Constitution's guarantees of equal protection and due process to all. Advocates argue that homosexuality is not a "choice" but a personal identity, a claim supported by the American Psychological Association (APA), and that all working people have a right to be judged by the quality of their work performance and not by completely unrelated factors. According to a study published in 2001 by the Williams Institute at the UCLA School of Law, reports of discrimination based on sexual orientation are roughly equal to those on race or gender. The APA also states that there is significant discrimination against homosexual people in the workforce.

The Congressional Budget Office in 2002 estimated that the Equal Employment Opportunity Commission's complaint caseload would rise by 5 to 7% as a result of the proposed law. Assessments of the impact of comparable state policies also show a minimal impact on caseload. Regarding constitutionality, the act incorporates language similar to that of Title VII of the Civil Rights Act of 1964, which has consistently been upheld by the courts.

In 1994, Barry Goldwater, a hero among the conservative and libertarian movements, became honorary chairman of a drive to pass a federal law preventing job discrimination on the basis of sexual orientation.

=== In opposition to ENDA ===
Ed Vitagliano, director of research for the American Family Association (AFA), expressed concern about the impact of anti-discrimination laws on religious organizations. He cited a lack of clarity around whether the narrow exemption would apply to support staff and lay employees in addition to churches and clergy.

The Traditional Values Coalition (TVC) has claimed that the legislation would have a negative impact on school children by eliminating schools' ability to avoid hiring transgender teachers. It said that "If ENDA passes, students and children in daycare centers all across the nation will be subjected to individuals experimenting with their gender identities."

Some libertarians argue that laws against private sector discrimination are acts of coercion that infringe on employers' property rights and freedom of association.

The United States Conference of Catholic Bishops said ENDA goes beyond prohibiting unjust discrimination and poses several problems. It notes, for example, that the bill: (1) lacks an exception for a "bona fide occupational qualification," which exists for every other category of discrimination under Title VII of the Civil Rights Act, except for race; (2) lacks a distinction between homosexual inclination and conduct, thus affirming and protecting extramarital sexual conduct; (3) supports the redefinition of marriage, as state-level laws like ENDA have been invoked in state court decisions finding marriage discriminatory or irrational; (4) rejects the biological basis of gender by defining "gender identity" as something people may choose at variance with their biological sex; and (5) threatens religious liberty by punishing as discrimination the religious or moral disapproval of same-sex sexual conduct, while protecting only some religious employers.

In June and July 2014, several pro-LGBT advocacy groups, including the American Civil Liberties Union, National Center for Lesbian Rights, National Gay and Lesbian Task Force, Transgender Law Center, and Lambda Legal, announced they were withdrawing support for the 113th Congress version of ENDA because of their concerns about the breadth of its religious exemption in relation to the ruling in Burwell v. Hobby Lobby Stores, Inc..

== Legislative history ==
Congress	Short title	Bill number(s)	Gender identity included?	Date introduced	Sponsor(s)	# of cosponsors	Latest status
103rd Congress	Employment Non-Discrimination Act of 1994	H.R. 4636	No	June 23, 1994	Gerry Studds (D-MA)	137	Died in the House Subcommittee on Select Education and Civil Rights
103rd Congress	Employment Non-Discrimination Act of 1994	S. 2238	No	July 29, 1994	Ted Kennedy (D-MA)	30	Died in the Senate Committee on Labor and Human Resources
104th Congress	Employment Non-Discrimination Act of 1995	H.R. 1863	No	June 15, 1995	Gerry Studds (D-MA)	142	Died in the House Subcommittee on the Constitution
104th Congress	Employment Non-Discrimination Act of 1995	S. 932	No	June 15, 1995	Jim Jeffords (R-VT)	30	Died in the Senate Committee on Labor and Human Resources
104th Congress	Employment Non-Discrimination Act of 1995	S. 2056	No	September 5, 1996	Ted Kennedy (D-MA)	3	Failed in Senate (49–50)
105th Congress	Employment Non-Discrimination Act of 1997	H.R. 1858	No	June 10, 1997	Christopher Shays (R-CT)	140	Died in the House Subcommittee on Employer-Employee Relations
105th Congress	Employment Non-Discrimination Act of 1997	S. 869	No	June 10, 1997	Jim Jeffords (R-VT)	34	Died in the Senate Committee on Labor and Human Resources
106th Congress	Employment Non-Discrimination Act of 1999	H.R. 2355	No	June 24, 1999	Christopher Shays (R-CT)	173	Died in the House Subcommittee on Employer-Employee Relations
106th Congress	Employment Non-Discrimination Act of 1999	S. 1276	No	June 24, 1999	Jim Jeffords (R-VT)	36	Died in the Senate Committee on Health, Education, Labor, and Pensions
107th Congress	Employment Non-Discrimination Act of 2001	H.R. 2692	No	July 31, 2001	Christopher Shays (R-CT)	193	Died in the House Subcommittee on Employer-Employee Relations
107th Congress	Employment Non-Discrimination Act of 2002	S. 1284	No	July 31, 2001	Ted Kennedy (D-MA)	44	Died in the Senate
108th Congress	Employment Non-Discrimination Act of 2003	H.R. 3285	No	October 8, 2003	Christopher Shays (R-CT)	180	Died in the House Subcommittee on Employer-Employee Relations
108th Congress	Employment Non-Discrimination Act of 2003	S. 1705	No	October 2, 2003	Ted Kennedy (D-MA)	43	Died in the Senate Committee on Health, Education, Labor, and Pensions
110th Congress	Employment Non-Discrimination Act of 2007	H.R. 2015	Yes	April 24, 2007	Barney Frank (D-MA)	184	Died in the House Subcommittee on the Constitution, Civil Rights and Civil Liberties
110th Congress	Employment Non-Discrimination Act of 2007	H.R. 3685	No	September 27, 2007	Barney Frank (D-MA)	9	Passed the House (235–184), died in the Senate
111th Congress	Employment Non-Discrimination Act of 2009	H.R. 3017	Yes	June 24, 2009	Barney Frank (D-MA)	203	Died in the Judiciary, House Administration, Education and Labor, and Oversight and Government Reform committees. Hearings held September 23, 2009 in Education and Labor committee.
111th Congress	Employment Non-Discrimination Act of 2009	H.R. 2981	Yes	June 19, 2009	Barney Frank (D-MA)	12	Died in the House Judiciary Committee
111th Congress	Employment Non-Discrimination Act of 2009	S. 1584	Yes	August 5, 2009	Jeff Merkley (D-OR)	45	Died in the Senate Health, Education, Labor, and Pensions Committee Hearings held November 5, 2009.
112th Congress	Employment Non-Discrimination Act of 2011	H.R. 1397	Yes	April 6, 2011	Barney Frank (D-MA)	171	Died in the Education and the Workforce, House Administration, Oversight and Government Reform, and Judiciary committees.
112th Congress	Employment Non-Discrimination Act of 2011	S. 811	Yes	April 14, 2011	Jeff Merkley (D-OR)	43	Died in the Health, Education, Labor, and Pensions committee. Hearings held June 12, 2012.
113th Congress	Employment Non-Discrimination Act of 2013	H.R. 1755	Yes	April 25, 2013	Jared Polis (D-CO)	205	Referred to the Education and the Workforce, House Administration, Oversight and Government Reform, and Judiciary committees.
113th Congress	Employment Non-Discrimination Act of 2013	S. 815	Yes	April 25, 2013	Jeff Merkley (D-OR)	56	Passed in Senate (64–32), died in the House.

From the 114th Congress onwards, efforts to pass non-discrimination legislation has focused on the broader Equality Act which focuses on additional protections including in housing and the jury system as well as employment.

== See also ==
- Equality Act
