= 2017 United Kingdom elections =

Several elections were held in the United Kingdom in 2017:

- 2017 United Kingdom general election
  - United Kingdom general election, 2017 (England)
  - United Kingdom general election, 2017 (Northern Ireland)
  - United Kingdom general election, 2017 (Scotland)
  - United Kingdom general election, 2017 (Wales)
  - List of MPs elected in the 2017 United Kingdom general election
- 2017 Caymanian general election
- 2017 Bermudian general election
- 2017 Falkland Islands general election
- 2017 Saint Helena general election
- 2017 United Kingdom local elections
  - 2017 Greater Manchester mayoral election
  - 2017 Northamptonshire County Council election
- 2017 Northern Ireland Assembly election
- 2017 City of London Corporation election
- 2017 Copeland by-election
- 2017 Stoke-on-Trent Central by-election
