= 2019 Southampton City Council election =

2019 UK local government election

← 2018	2 May 2019	2021 →

16 of the 48 seats to Southampton City Council 25 seats needed for a majority
	First party	Second party	Third party
Leader	Christopher Hammond	Dan Fitzhenry	N/A
Party	Labour	Conservative	Independent
Leader's seat	Woolston	Harefield	N/A
Last election	25	19	4
Seats before	26	19	3
Seats won	9	7	0
Seats after	29	18	1
Seat change	▲3	▼1	▼2
Popular vote	18,788	17,266
Percentage	37.25%	34.23%
- Map showing the election results. Each ward represents 1 seat
Council control before election
Labour
Council control after election
Labour

Elections to Southampton City Council took place on Thursday 2 May 2019, alongside other local elections across the country. The Labour Party held a narrow majority of two at the last election and the seats contested in this election were last contested in 2015. Labour were defending 6 seats, the Conservatives were defending 8, whilst independent councillors, who held two seats, were not standing re-elections. Following a by-election in the Coxford ward where Labour gained the seat formerly held by an independent.

The result saw the Labour Party gain Coxford, Freemantle, Portswood and Swaythling, but lost Millbrook and Bitterne to the Conservatives, making a net gain of three.

== Background ==
The council elects its councillors in thirds, with a third being up for election every year for three years, with no election each fourth year to correspond with councillors' four-year terms. Councillors defending their seats in this election were previously elected in 2015. In that election, 8 Conservative candidates, 7 Labour candidates were elected and independent People Before Profit councillor was elected in Coxford. After the 2015 local election, the Labour Party saw a loss of one of their Councillors, Andrew Pope, who formed the Southampton Independents party. He is not seeking re-election in this election. The last election in 2018 saw both the council leader Simon Letts and leader of the Conservative bloc in the city be defeated in their wards by each other's party. Letts was replaced with Christopher Hammond as council leader, and Dan Fitzhenry as leader of the Conservatives.

People Before Profit, an independent group with all three of its councillors elected in the Coxford ward, decided to separate after the 2018 election. On 3 January 2019, former group leader of People Before Profit, Keith Morrell, announced that he would resign with immediate effect, triggering a by-election in the year. Hours later, Don Thomas announced he would not seek re-election in the Coxford ward.

=== 14 March by-election ===
Due to the independent councillor Keith Morrell resigning as a councillor, a by-election was triggered for the Coxford ward. Morrell was re-elected in the seat for a third term in the 2018 elections, with 47% of the vote. The Conservative Party candidate for the by-election Diana Galton is the mother of Millbrook Councillor Steven Galton, a front bench member for the Conservatives.

Coxford By-Election 14 March 2019
Party	Candidate	Votes	%	±%
Labour Co-op	Matthew Renyard	668	26.2	−2.0
Conservative	Diana Galton	529	20.7	+4.3
Liberal Democrats	Josh Smith	450	17.6	+14.7
Socialist Alternative	Susan Anne Atkins	368	14.4	N/A
Integrity Southampton	David John Fletcher	178	7.0	N/A
Independent	Richard Terrence McQuillan	174	6.8	N/A
UKIP	Derek Lascelles Humber	123	4.8	N/A
Green	Cara Anne Sandys	53	2.1	−0.9
Majority		139	5.4	
Turnout		2,551	25.0	−7.7
Labour gain from Independent		Swing		

=== Campaigning ===
Commentators had noted that though Southampton was a Labour controlled area, these local elections were difficult and the council is vulnerable. Labour in the city had started incorporating more wealth building programs into their economic agenda to mitigate austerity in the city, similar to what is known as the "Preston model".

The Conservatives caused a controversy as they selected Josh Payne to contest Woolston, who shared the same surname as the incumbent Warwick Payne. Warwick Payne was concerned that people would mix them up on the ballot paper.

== Election results ==
Immediately ahead of this election, the composition of the council was:

↓
26	19	3
Labour	Conservative	Oth

After the election result, the composition of the council became:

↓
29	18	1
Labour	Conservative	Oth

As the council is elected in thirds, one councillor for each of the 16 wards are elected each year for 3 years with no election in the 4th year. All comparisons in seats and swing are to the corresponding 2015 election.

2019 Southampton City Council election
Party	This election			Full council			This election		
Party	Seats	Net	Seats %	Other	Total	Total %	Votes	Votes %	+/−
Labour	9	▲3	56.3	20	29	60.4	18,788	37.3	+3.1
Conservative	7	▼1	43.7	11	18	37.5	17,266	34.2	+0.1
Liberal Democrats	0	Steady	0.0	0	0	0.0	6,356	12.6	+5.4
Green	0	Steady	0.0	0	0	0.0	4,950	9.8	+1.2
UKIP	0	Steady	0.0	0	0	0.0	2,756	5.5	–7.1
Integrity Southampton	0	Steady	0.0	0	0	0.0	236	0.5	New
Socialist Alternative	0	Steady	0.0	0	0	0.0	80	0.2	New

== Ward results ==
The statement of persons nominated was revealed 3 April 2019. A (*) by a councillor's name indicates that they were standing for re-election, The declaration of the results were posted on 3 May.

Bargate
Party	Candidate	Votes	%	±%
Labour	John Noon*	1,363	49.1	+6.6
Conservative	Matt Magee	683	24.6	−10.5
Green	Joe Cox	435	15.7	+1.1
Liberal Democrats	Joshua Jason Coleman Smith	263	9.5	+4.5
Majority		680	24.5	+17.1
Turnout		2,777	22.39	−29.62
Labour hold		Swing	+8.6	

Bassett
Party	Candidate	Votes	%	±%
Conservative	Les Harris*	1,252	33.9	−12.1
Liberal Democrats	Richard Blackman	1,236	33.4	22.2
Labour	Simon Osler	658	17.8	−5.3
UKIP	John Dean Leaver	267	7.2	−2.3
Green	Bethany Norman	267	7.2	−1.7
Majority		16	0.4	−22.5
Turnout		3,696	35.98	−29.57
Conservative hold		Swing	-17.2	

Bevois
Party	Candidate	Votes	%	±%
Labour	Jacqui Rayment	1,743	65.6	+11.1
Green	Ron Meldrum	374	14.1	+0.6
Conservative	Gloria Munetsi	291	11.0	−7.2
Liberal Democrats	Vijay Chopra	218	8.2	+1.5
Majority		1,369	51.5	+15.1
Turnout		2,656	24.52	−30.39
Labour hold		Swing	+5.3	

Bitterne
Party	Candidate	Votes	%	±%
Conservative	Elliot David Prior	1,062	38.2	+5.2
Labour	Andy Frampton	941	33.8	−6.2
UKIP	Kevin Alan Masters	421	15.1	−2.7
Green	Jenny Barnes	206	7.4	+3.1
Liberal Democrats	Olivia Caitlin Reed	141	5.1	+1.0
Majority		121	4.3	−2.7
Turnout		2,782	27.91	−28.00
Conservative gain from Labour		Swing	+5.7	

Bitterne Park
Party	Candidate	Votes	%	±%
Conservative	David John Fuller	1,756	47.0	+7.5
Labour Co-op	Simon James Oldham	1,092	29.2	−0.6
Green	Lindsi Bluemel	511	13.7	+4.9
Liberal Democrats	Carol Juliet Lloyd	380	10.2	+2.2
Majority		664	17.8	8.1
Turnout		3739	36.43	−28.83
Conservative hold		Swing	+4.1	

Coxford
Party	Candidate	Votes	%	±%
Labour	Barrie Margetts	768	29.0	+7.8
Conservative	Diana June Galton	739	27.9	+8.8
Liberal Democrats	Sam Philip Chapman	470	17.7	+14.3
Socialist Alternative - Putting People First	Sue Atkins	442	16.7	+16.7
Green	Cara Anne Sandys	194	7.3	+4.0
Majority		29	1.1	−14.4
Turnout		2651	26.01	−32.70
Labour gain from Independent		Swing	+22.3	

Freemantle
Party	Candidate	Votes	%	±%
Labour	Vivienne Windle	1,503	43.4	+9.4
Conservative	Vikkie Cheng	978	28.3	−7.0
Green	John Charles Thomas Spottiswoode	481	13.9	+1.3
Liberal Democrats	Andrew Thomas Beal	442	12.8	+5.9
Majority		525	15.2	+13.9
Turnout		3460	31.42	−29.27
Labour gain from Conservative		Swing	+8.2	

Harefield
Party	Candidate	Votes	%	±%
Conservative	Dan Fitzhenry	1,646	47.0	+3.0
Labour Co-op	Alan Lloyd	1,088	31.1	+1.3
Green	Chris Bluemel	291	8.3	+3.9
Integrity Southampton	Peter Alexander Virgo	236	6.7	+6.7
Liberal Democrats	John Robert Charles Dennis	221	6.3	+1.4
Majority		558	15.9	+1.7
Turnout		3503	33.82	−28.22
Conservative hold		Swing	+0.9	

Millbrook
Party	Candidate	Votes	%	±%
Conservative	Graham Reginald Galton	1,541	43.6	10.9
Labour	David Furnell	1,203	34.1	−1.3
Green	Jonathan Simon Bean	380	10.8	+4.2
Liberal Democrats	Samuel David Harris	237	6.7	+0.4
Socialist Alternative - Putting People First	Maggie Fricker	103	2.9	+2.9
Majority		338	9.6	+7.0
Turnout		3513	31.86	−26.84
Conservative gain from Labour		Swing	+6.1	

Peartree
Party	Candidate	Votes	%	±%
Conservative	Alex Houghton	1,737	46.0	+7.9
Labour	Jackie Landman	1162	30.8	−1.6
UKIP	Kim Rose	369	9.8	−5.4
Green	Rosanna Newey	261	6.9	+0.6
Liberal Democrats	Robert William Naish	229	6.1	−0.9
Majority		575	15.2	+9.5
Turnout		3773	36.54	−26.33
Conservative hold		Swing	+4.8	

Portswood
Party	Candidate	Votes	%	±%
Labour	Gordon Cooper	1,219	34.2	+6.0
Liberal Democrats	James Arnold Read	1016	28.5	+8.4
Green	Katherine Jane Barbour	637	17.9	+0.5
Conservative	James Victor Burgess	615	17.3	−14.5
Socialist Alternative - Putting People First	Nick Chaffey	48	1.3	+1.3
Majority		203	5.7	+2.1
Turnout		3560	34.42	−28.76
Labour gain from Conservative		Swing	+10.3	

Redbridge
Party	Candidate	Votes	%	±%
Labour	Sally Victoria Spicer	1,154	42.9	+5.0
UKIP	Richard John Lyons	730	27.1	+2.2
Conservative	Richard Arthur Palmer	558	20.7	−6.0
Liberal Democrats	Simon David Stokes	233	8.7	+4.4
Majority		424	15.8	+4.6
Turnout		2692	24.69	−28.14
Labour hold		Swing	+5.5	

Shirley
Party	Candidate	Votes	%	±%
Labour	Satvir Kaur	1,685	41.9	+6.0
Conservative	Andrew Hetherton	1200	29.8	−5.0
Liberal Democrats	Alex Clifton-Melhuish	445	11.1	+4.3
Green	Lucy Michelle Mundell	383	9.5	+0.2
UKIP	Pearline Hingston	286	7.1	−3.1
Majority		485	12.1	+11.0
Turnout		4023	38.49	−26.22
Labour hold		Swing	+5.5	

Sholing
Party	Candidate	Votes	%	±%
Conservative	Sarah Marie Vaughan	1,679	51.8	+10.2
Labour	Pat Evemy	910	28.1	−4.2
Liberal Democrats	Eileen Margaret Bowers	379	11.7	+7.6
Socialist Alternative - Putting People First	Declan Peter Clune	207	6.4	+6.4
Majority		769	23.7	+14.4
Turnout		3241	30.42	−34.14
Conservative hold		Swing	+7.2	

Swaythling
Party	Candidate	Votes	%	±%
Labour	Matt Bunday	1,023	40.7	+10.1
Conservative	Spiros Vassiliou	748	29.7	−1.7
Liberal Democrats	Sarah Wood	252	10.0	+0.1
Green	Angela Mary Cotton	246	9.8	−2.3
UKIP	Alan Kebbell	235	9.3	−4.9
Majority		275	10.9	+10.1
Turnout		2516	29.08	−28.45
Labour gain from Conservative		Swing	+5.9	

Woolston
Party	Candidate	Votes	%	±%
Labour	Warwick Payne	1,276	42.5	+1.8
Conservative	Josh Payne	781	26.0	−4.3
UKIP	Derek Humber	448	14.9	−1.7
Green	Clive Hillman	284	9.5	+4.4
Liberal Democrats	Colin Bleach	194	6.5	+1.1
Majority		495	16.5	+6.1
Turnout		3002	27.93	−29.86
Labour hold		Swing	+3.1	
