= 2017 United Kingdom general election in England =

- 8 June 2017

All 533 English seats to the House of Commons 267 seats needed for English majority
- Turnout: 69.1% (▲3.1 pp)
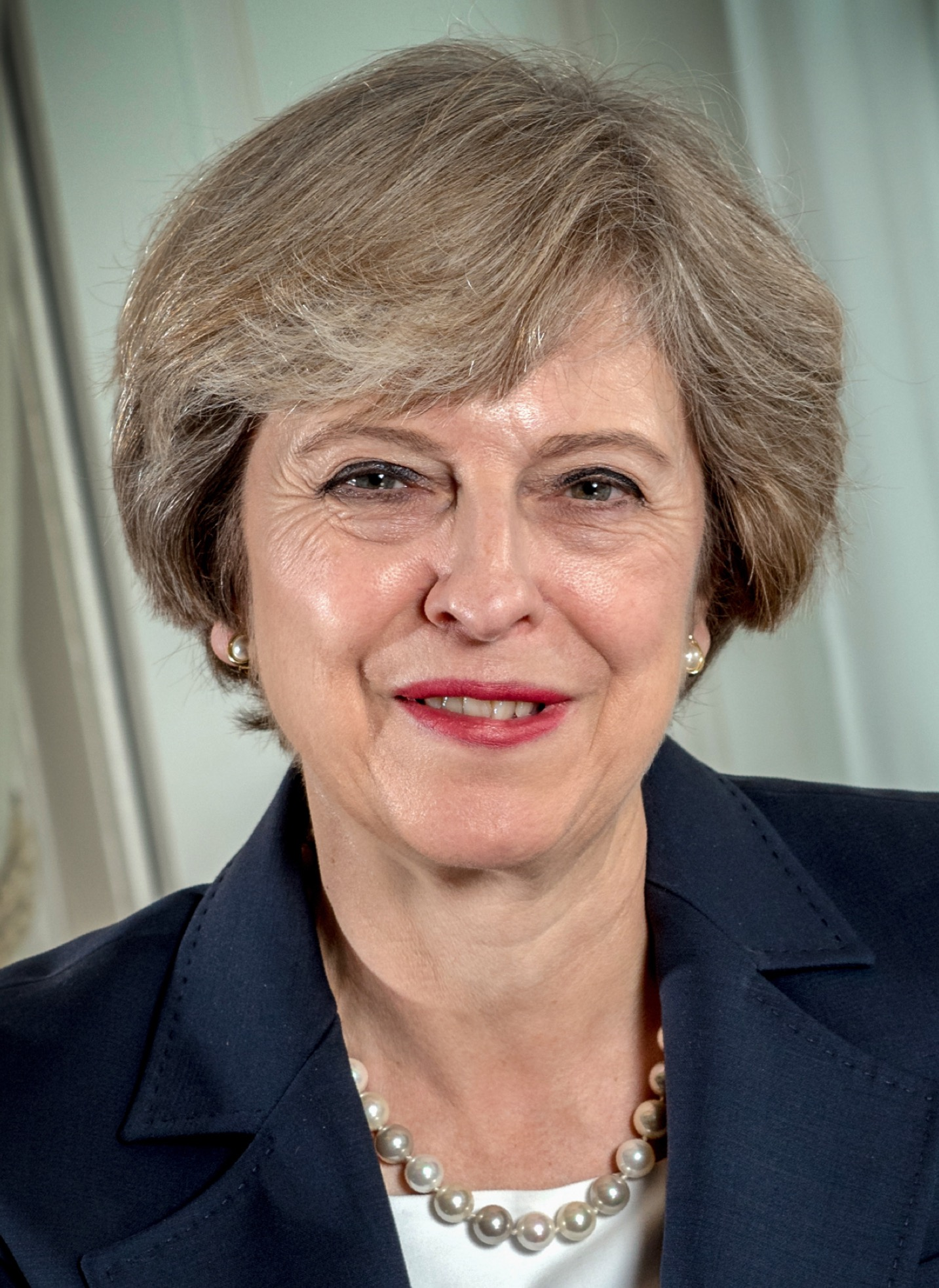

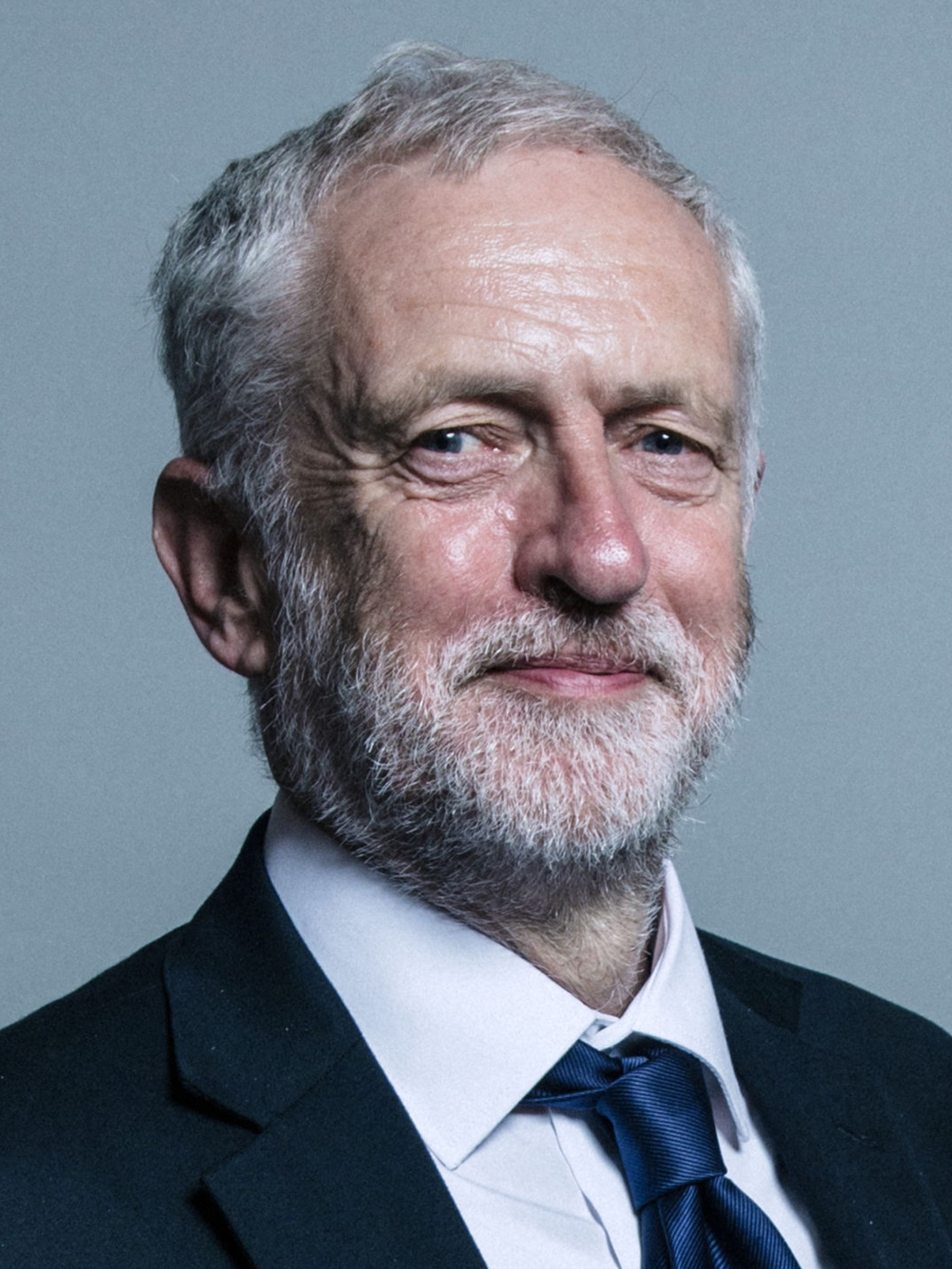

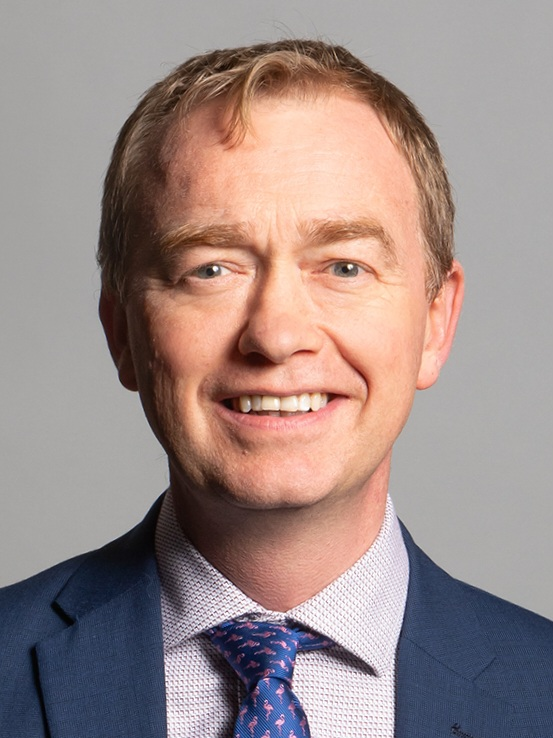

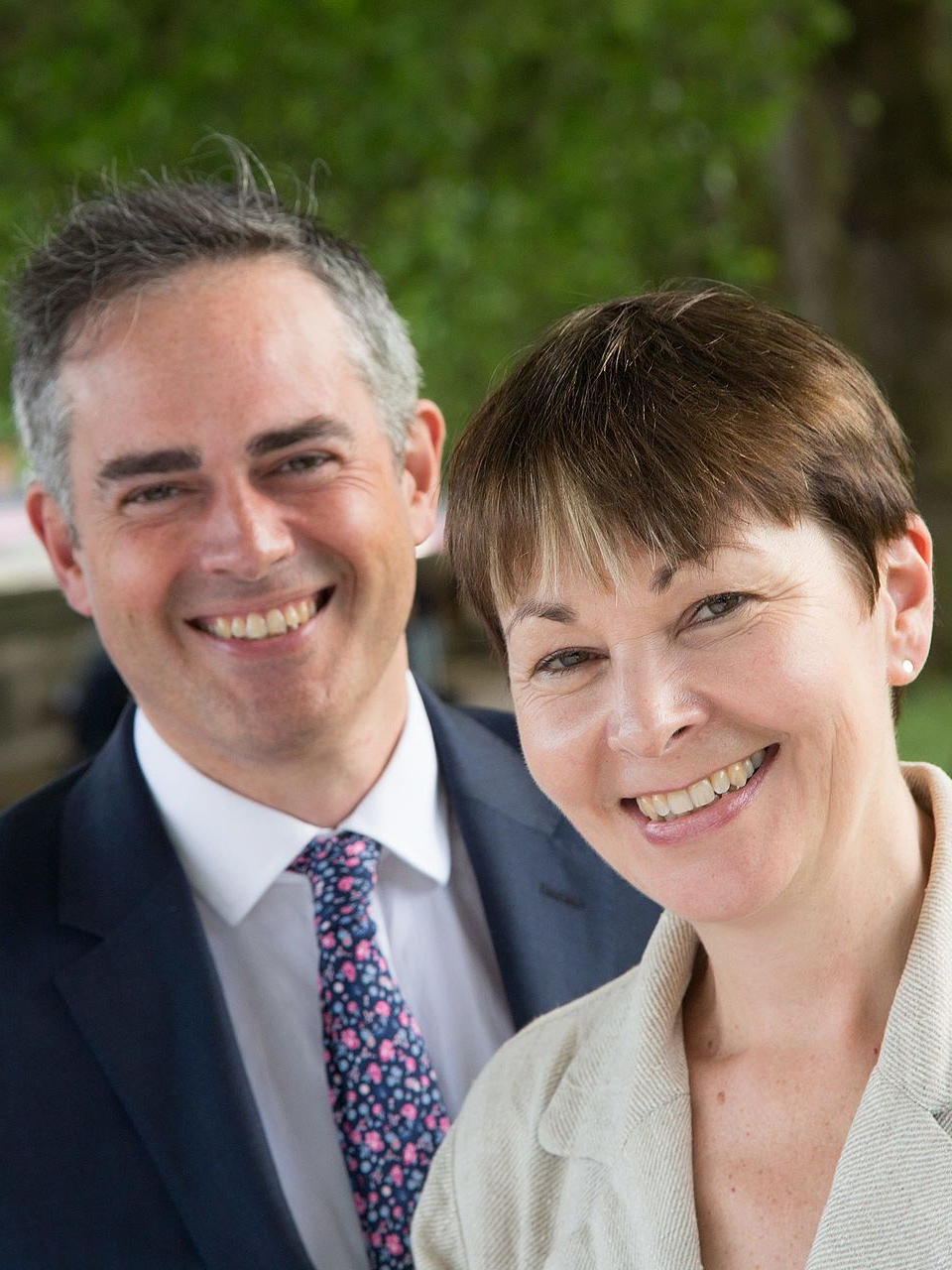
	First party	Second party
Leader	Theresa May	Jeremy Corbyn
Party	Conservative	Labour
Leader since	11 July 2016	12 September 2015
Leader's seat	Maidenhead	Islington North
Last election	318 seats, 41.0%	206 seats, 31.6%
Seats before	318	205
Seats won	296*	227
Seat change	▼22	▲21
Popular vote	12,346,001	11,389,557
Percentage	45.4%	41.9%
Swing	▲4.4 pp	▲10.3 pp
	Third party	Fourth party
Leader	Tim Farron	Caroline Lucas & Jonathan Bartley
Party	Liberal Democrats	Green
Leader since	16 July 2015	2 September 2016
Leader's seat	Westmorland and Lonsdale	Brighton Pavilion (Lucas); did not stand (Bartley)
Last election	6 seats, 8.2%	1 seats, 4.2%
Seats before	6	1
Seats won	8	1
Seat change	▲2	Steady
Popular vote	2,121,760	507,199
Percentage	7.8%	1.9%
Swing	▼0.4 pp	▼2.3 pp
- A map of English parliamentary constituencies *Seat figure does not include Speaker of the House of Commons John Bercow, who was included in the Conservative seat total by some media outlets.

On Thursday 8 June 2017, the 2017 United Kingdom general election was held in England, to elect all 650 members of the House of Commons, with 533 constituencies being in England.

== Candidates ==
Below is a table summarising the candidates of the 2017 general election in England, showing parties that stood 10 or more candidates each.

Affiliation	Candidates
Conservative and Unionist Party	532
Labour Party	532
Liberal Democrats	530
Green Party of England and Wales	447
UK Independence Party	336
Christian Peoples Alliance	31
Yorkshire Party	21
Official Monster Raving Loony Party	11
British National Party	10
Others	266
Total	2,716

== Analysis ==
The Conservatives retained a majority of seats in England, though with a net loss of 23 seats. They also increased their share of the vote to their highest since 1987.

The Labour Party substantially increased their share of the vote and made gains for the first time since 2001, but did not overtake the Conservatives. Labour received its highest share of the vote in England since 1997.

The Liberal Democrats, led by Tim Farron saw their previous leader Nick Clegg lose his seat; as Sheffield Hallam was gained by the Labour candidate, Jared O'Mara. They also lost their by-election gain at Richmond Park to Zac Goldsmith of the Conservatives; whose resignation on 25 October 2016 triggered the by-election initially. They also gained some seats, including the recovery of Twickenham by former Business Secretary Sir Vince Cable who had lost it to the Conservatives two years previously. Cable succeeded Farron as party leader on 20 July 2017.

UKIP saw their share of the vote collapse to almost negligible levels. They failed to gain any new seats and their one success from 2015, Clacton, returned to Conservative control. Paul Nuttall resigned as party leader on 9 June 2017 after finishing in third place at Boston and Skegness.

The Green Party decreased its share of the vote and failed to make any gains, but retained Brighton Pavilion. The party deliberately chose not to contest many seats, in order to give Labour an increased chance of winning over Conservative candidates.

== Results ==
Below is a table summarising the results of the 2017 general election in England, showing all parties above 500 votes.

Party	Seats					Aggregate Votes		
Party	Total	Gains	Losses	Net	Of all (%)	Total	Of all (%)	Change (%)
Conservative	296	8	30	▼22	55.5	12,346,001	45.4	▲4.4
Labour	227	27	6	▲21	42.6	11,389,557	41.9	▲10.3
Liberal Democrats	8	5	3	▲2	1.5	2,121,760	7.8	▼0.4
UKIP	0	0	1	▼1	—	557,390	2.1	▼12.1
Green	1	0	0	Steady	0.2	507,199	1.9	▼2.3
Speaker	1	0	0	Steady	0.2	34,299	0.1	Steady
Yorkshire	0	0	0	Steady	—	20,958	0.1	▲0.1
NHA	0	0	0	Steady	—	16,119	0.1	Steady
CPA	0	0	0	Steady	—	5,869	0.0	Steady
Ashfield Ind.	0	Did not stand in 2015			—	4,612	0.0	—N/a
BNP	0	0	0	Steady	—	4,580	0.0	Steady
Monster Raving Loony	0	0	0	Steady	—	3,733	0.0	Steady
Liberal	0	0	0	Steady	—	3,672	0.0	Steady
Women's Equality	0	New			—	3,066	0.0	New
North East	0	0	0	Steady	—	2,355	0.0	Steady
English Democrat	0	0	0	Steady	—	1,913	0.0	Steady
Pirate	0	0	0	Steady	—	1,875	0.0	Steady
Socialist Labour	0	Did not stand in 2015			—	1,154	0.0	—N/a
JAC	0	New			—	991	0.0	New
Animal Welfare	0	0	0	Steady	—	955	0.0	Steady
Southampton Independents	0	New			—	816	0.0	New
Workers Revolutionary	0	0	0	Steady	—	771	0.0	Steady
Demos Direct Initiative	0	New			—	551	0.0	New
Libertarian	0	Did not stand in 2015			—	524	0.0	—N/a
Others and Independents	0	—N/a			—	125,280	0.5	—N/a
Total	533			0	100.0	27,156,000	100.0	0.0
Registered voters, and turnout						39,316,335	69.1	▲3.1

Popular vote
Conservative	45.4%
Labour	41.9%
Liberal Democrats	7.8%
UKIP	2.1%
Green	1.9%
Other	0.9%

Parliament seats
Conservative	55.5%
Labour	42.6%
Liberal Democrats	1.5%
Green	0.2%
Speaker	0.2%

== By region ==
Regional vote shares and changes are sourced from the House of Commons Library.

=== East Midlands ===
Party	Seats					Aggregate Votes		
Party	Total	Gains	Losses	Net	Of all (%)	Total	Of all (%)	Change (%)
Conservative	31	2	3	▼1	67.4	1,195,982	50.7	▲7.3
Labour	15	3	2	▲1	32.6	954,635	40.5	▲8.9
Liberal Democrats	0	0	0	Steady	0.0	101,612	4.3	▼1.3
UKIP	0	0	0	Steady	0.0	56,358	2.4	▼13.4
Green	0	0	0	Steady	0.0	34,355	1.5	▼1.5
Others	0	0	0	Steady	0.0	14,508	0.6	Steady
Total	46					2,357,450	69.0	▲3.5

East Midlands

=== East of England ===
Party	Seats					Aggregate Votes		
Party	Total	Gains	Losses	Net	Of all (%)	Total	Of all (%)	Change (%)
Conservative	50	1	3	▼2	86.2	1,690,813	54.6	▲5.6
Labour	7	3	0	▲3	12.1	1,012,357	32.7	▲10.7
Liberal Democrats	1	0	0	Steady	1.7	244,054	7.9	▼0.4
UKIP	0	0	1	▼1	0.0	77,793	2.5	▼13.7
Green	0	0	0	Steady	0.0	58,704	1.9	▼2.0
Others	0	0	0	Steady	0.0	10,765	0.3	▼0.2
Total	58					3,094,486	69.8	▲2.3

East of England

=== Greater London ===
Party	Seats					Aggregate Votes		
Party	Total	Gains	Losses	Net	Of all (%)	Total	Of all (%)	Change (%)
Labour	49	4	0	▲4	67.1	2,086,603	54.5	▲10.8
Conservative	21	0	6	▼6	28.8	1,268,800	33.1	▼1.7
Liberal Democrats	3	2	0	▲2	4.1	336,725	8.8	▲1.1
Green	0	0	0	Steady	0.0	67,579	1.8	▼3.1
UKIP	0	0	0	Steady	0.0	49,369	1.3	▼6.8
Others	0	0	0	Steady	0.0	18,682	0.5	▼0.2
Total	73					3,827,758	70.1	▲4.7

Greater London

=== North East England ===
Party	Seats					Aggregate Votes		
Party	Total	Gains	Losses	Net	Of all (%)	Total	Of all (%)	Change (%)
Labour	26	1	1	Steady	89.7	709,738	55.4	▲8.6
Conservative	3	1	1	Steady	10.3	440,613	34.4	▲9.1
Liberal Democrats	0	0	0	Steady	0.0	58,409	4.6	▼1.9
UKIP	0	0	0	Steady	0.0	49,348	3.9	▼12.9
Green	0	0	0	Steady	0.0	16,080	1.3	▼2.4
Others	0	0	0	Steady	0.0	5,720	0.5	▼0.5
	29					1,279,908	66.0	▲4.2

North East England

=== North West England ===
Party	Seats					Aggregate Votes		
Party	Total	Gains	Losses	Net	Of all (%)	Total	Of all (%)	Change (%)
Labour	54	4	1	▲3	72.0	1,972,632	54.9	▲10.2
Conservative	20	2	4	▼2	26.7	1,301,562	36.2	▲5.0
Liberal Democrats	1	0	1	▼1	1.3	193,053	5.4	▼1.2
UKIP	0	0	0	Steady	0.0	68,946	1.9	▼11.7
Green	0	0	0	Steady	0.0	39,608	1.1	▼2.1
Others	0	0	0	Steady	0.0	20,352	0.5	▼0.2
	75					3,596,153	67.8	▲3.5

North West England

In Cheshire the 2015 result was reversed, with Labour winning seven seats and the Conservatives four. Crewe and Nantwich was a gain for Labour, with tutor and activist Laura Smith defeating children and families minister Edward Timpson. In Tatton, former chancellor George Osborne did not seek re-election, having become editor of the Evening Standard. He was succeeded by Esther McVey, who had been a junior DWP minister in the Cameron-Clegg coalition prior to her defeat in Wirral West in 2015. In Warrington South the care and support minister David Mowat was defeated by the borough's former mayor Faisal Rashid. City councillor and trade unionist Mike Amesbury gained Weaver Vale from Graham Evans.

=== South East England ===
Party	Seats					Aggregate Votes		
Party	Total	Gains	Losses	Net	Of all (%)	Total	Of all (%)	Change (%)
Conservative	72	0	6	▼6	85.7	2,495,350	53.8	▲3.0
Labour	8	4	0	▲4	9.5	1,326,380	28.6	▲10.3
Liberal Democrats	2	2	0	▲2	2.4	487,203	10.5	▲1.1
Green	1	0	0	Steady	1.2	143,873	3.1	▼2.1
UKIP	0	0	0	Steady	0.0	104,509	2.3	▼12.5
Speaker	1	0	0	Steady	1.2	34,299	0.7	Steady
Others	0	0	0	Steady	0.0	44,822	1.0	▲0.2
	84					4,636,436	71.2	▲2.6

South East England

Of the eight constituencies in Berkshire six were held by the Conservatives. The party leader and prime minister Theresa May was re-elected, as were justice minister Dr Phillip Lee, Asia minister Alok Sharma and former trade secretary Dr John Redwood. Labour held Slough for Tan Dhesi. Labour also gained Reading East, with former civil servant Matt Rodda defeating civil society minister Rob Wilson.

No seats changed allegiance in Buckinghamshire. Commons leader Dr David Lidington, veterans minister Lieutenant Colonel Mark Lancaster and former attorney-general Dominic Grieve were re-elected. John Bercow, speaker of the House of Commons, returned in Buckingham uncontested by the main political parties.

In Hampshire the Conservatives were successful in sixteen seats. DWP ministers Damian Hinds and Penny Mordaunt, May's own PPS George Hollingbery, Cabinet Office undersecretary Caroline Nokes and assistant whip Steve Brine were re-elected. Labour won two seats, with shadow energy minister Alan Whitehead holding Southampton Test and city councillor Stephen Morgan gaining Portsmouth South from Flick Drummond (giving that constituency its first Labour MP in its ninety-nine-year history).

Labour gained Canterbury, with former teaching assistant Rosie Duffield defeating Sir Julian Brazier. This ended the monopoly which the Conservatives had enjoyed across Kent since 2010. The rest of the seats held, with work & pensions secretary Damian Green securing re-election alongside sport minister Tracey Crouch, defence secretary Sir Michael Fallon and business secretary Greg Clark.

In Oxfordshire the Conservatives held four of the six seats including Witney, which had elected David Cameron two years prior. Labour held Oxford East, while Oxford West and Abingdon was a gain for the Liberal Democrats, with former teacher Layla Moran defeating public health undersecretary Nicola Blackwood.

For the fourth general election in a row the Conservatives made a clean sweep of Surrey. Prisons undersecretary Sam Gyimah, transport secretary Chris Grayling, deputy chief whip Anne Milton, chancellor Philip Hammond, health secretary Jeremy Hunt and former lord chancellor Michael Gove all held their seats here.

=== South West England ===
Party	Seats					Aggregate Votes		
Party	Total	Gains	Losses	Net	Of all (%)	Total	Of all (%)	Change (%)
Conservative	47	0	4	▼4	85.5	1,542,296	51.4	▲4.8
Labour	7	3	0	▲3	12.7	875,213	29.1	▲11.5
Liberal Democrats	1	1	0	▲1	1.8	448,730	14.9	▼0.2
Green	0	0	0	Steady	0.0	68,010	2.3	▼3.7
UKIP	0	0	0	Steady	0.0	33,160	1.1	▼12.5
Others	0	0	0	Steady	0.0	35,469	1.2	Steady
	55					3,002,878	71.8	▲2.3

South West England

The combined representation of Labour and the Liberal Democrats doubled compared to 2015, but the Conservatives still had a landslide and also increased their vote share to an outright majority.

In Cornwall the Conservatives held all six constituencies, re-electing junior ministers George Eustice and Sarah Newton.

In Devon Labour made one gain in Plymouth Sutton and Devonport, trade unionist Luke Pollard defeating Oliver Colvile. They also held Exeter for the sixth consecutive time. The other ten constituencies were held by the Conservatives, including treasury minister Mel Stride and former FCO minister Sir Hugo Swire, who defeated a challenge by independent candidate Claire Wright in his East Devon constituency. The former armed forces minister Sir Nick Harvey attempted to regain the constituency of North Devon but the Conservative Peter Heaton-Jones held it by a margin of 4,332.

In Dorset all eight Conservative MPs were re-elected, including the counter-terrorism minister Tobias Ellwood and former Lancaster chancellor Sir Oliver Letwin.

The Conservatives held five seats in Gloucestershire, returning former chief whip Mark Harper. Labour gained Stroud, where Forest Green Rovers chairman David Drew defeated Neil Carmichael.

The five Somerset constituencies were all held by the Conservatives. Tessa Munt attempted unsuccessfully to regain Wells from James Heappey.

The Conservatives also held all seven seats in Wiltshire: Climate change minister Claire Perry was re-elected, as were DWP minister Justin Tomlinson and Solicitor General Robert Buckland.

=== West Midlands ===
Party	Seats					Aggregate Votes		
Party	Total	Gains	Losses	Net	Of all (%)	Total	Of all (%)	Change (%)
Conservative	35	2	1	▲1	59.3	1,356,468	49.0	▲7.3
Labour	24	1	2	▼1	40.7	1,175,095	42.5	▲9.6
Liberal Democrats	0	0	0	Steady	0.0	122,287	4.4	▼1.1
UKIP	0	0	0	Steady	0.0	50,106	1.8	▼13.9
Green	0	0	0	Steady	0.0	46,347	1.7	▼1.6
Others	0	0	0	Steady	0.0	16,061	0.6	▼0.3
	59					2,766,382	66.9	▲2.8

West Midlands

The Conservatives increased their majority and Labour fell back slightly. Both parties increased their share of the popular vote. The Liberal Democrats and Greens failed to make any improvement on the 2015 result, while UKIP saw its support collapse.

In the ceremonial county of West Midlands Labour won twenty seats and the Conservatives won eight. Gisela Stuart retired and was succeeded in Birmingham Edgbaston by Sandwell councillor Preet Gill, making her the first female Sikh in the House of Commons. Work & Pensions spokesman Jack Dromey (husband of Harriet Harman) was re-elected in Birmingham Erdington. Shadow Europe minister Khalid Mahmood achieved a fifth term as MP for Birmingham Perry Barr. Second Church Estates Commissioner Dame Caroline Spelman was returned im Meriden. Business minister Margot James won a third term in Stourbridge. Former Chief Whip Andrew Mitchell held Sutton Coldfield. Walsall councillor Eddie Hughes defeated the long-serving Labour backbencher David Winnick on a 12-point swing. Tom Watson, deputy Labour leader, was re-elected in West Bromwich East and Valerie Vaz, shadow leader of the Commons, held Walsall South.

The Conservatives made a clean sweep of Worcestershire for the third consecutive election. Their six MPs included communities secretary Sajid Javid and three junior ministers (Harriett Baldwin, Robin Walker and Mark Garnier).

The Conservatives also maintained their sweep of Shropshire from 2015. Five MPs were elected, including Philip Dunne (incumbent Minister of State for Health) and Owen Paterson (who had headed the Northern Ireland Office and Defra under the coalition).

In Staffordshire the Conservatives won nine seats and Labour the remaining three. Junior whips Andrew Griffiths and Christopher Pincher secured re-election, as did their predecessor Michael Fabricant in Lichfield, while Chief Whip Gavin Williamson increased his majority by two thousand. The Moorlands gave a third term to culture secretary Karen Bradley. Conservative Jack Brereton defeated Rob Flello, ending sixty-seven years of Labour representation in Stoke-on-Trent South.

In Warwickshire the Labour party gained Warwick and Leamington (county councillor Matt Western defeated Chris White, ending seven years of Conservative ascendancy.) The Conservatives held the five other seats, electing attorney-general Jeremy Wright, DCLG minister Marcus Jones and PPS Mark Pawsey.

In Herefordshire Jesse Norman and Bill Wiggin were both returned to Parliament.

=== Yorkshire and the Humber ===
Party	Seats					Aggregate Votes		
Party	Total	Gains	Losses	Net	Of all (%)	Total	Of all (%)	Change (%)
Labour	37	4	0	▲4	59.3	1,276,912	49.0	▲9.9
Conservative	17	0	2	▼2	40.7	1,054,099	40.5	▲7.8
Liberal Democrats	0	0	2	▼2	0.0	129,687	5.0	▼2.1
UKIP	0	0	0	Steady	0.0	67,801	2.6	▼13.4
Green	0	0	0	Steady	0.0	32,661	1.3	▼2.3
Others	0	0	0	Steady	0.0	45,171	1.7	▲0.1
	54					2,606,331	66.4	▲3.3

Yorkshire and the Humber

All seats in the region went to the two main parties: Labour increasing their dominance, the Conservatives falling back slightly, and the Liberal Democrats being swept away. UKIP had polled strongly in 2015 but this year declined to insignificance. The Green Party continued to have negligible presence.

All three Kingston-upon-Hull constituencies were held by Labour: Diana Johnson and Karl Turner were re-elected by large majorities, while former Home Secretary Alan Johnson retired and was replaced by Hessle town councillor Emma Hardy.

In the East Riding of Yorkshire, the four Conservative MPs (David Davis, Graham Stuart, Greg Knight and Andrew Percy) were all re-elected with substantially increased shares of the vote.

Labour made a clean sweep across South Yorkshire, holding the thirteen which they had already (including Doncaster North for former leader Ed Miliband and Doncaster Central for former Chief Whip Dame Rosie Winterton) as well as gaining Sheffield Hallam from the former Deputy Prime Minister Nick Clegg.

In West Yorkshire five Conservatives (Craig Whittaker, Alec Shelbrooke, Andrea Jenkyns, Stuart Andrew and Philip Davies) were re-elected. Two others (Jason McCartney and Kris Hopkins) were defeated by Labour, as was the only Liberal Democrat Greg Mulholland. Labour held the fourteen seats it had won in 2015, returning shadow Lord Chancellor Richard Burgon and leadership contender Yvette Cooper as well as actress Tracy Brabin who had been elected the previous autumn following the murder of Jo Cox.

No constituencies changed allegiance in North Yorkshire: Labour's Rachael Maskell was re-elected in York Central while all seven other seats were held by the Conservatives, including vice-chamberlain and junior whip Julian Smith and transport minister Andrew Jones.

In North and North East Lincolnshire Nic Dakin and Martin Vickers were both re-elected. Melanie Onn also won re-election in Great Grimsby.

== By county ==
The below tables summarise the results by county as used by the Boundary Commission for England at the time of the last boundary review.

=== Avon ===
Party	Seats	Aggregate votes	
Party	Total	Total	Of all (%)
Conservative	6	257,070	42.6
Labour	4	245,617	40.7
Liberal Democrats	1	71,017	11.8
Green	0	21,011	3.5
UKIP	0	3,604	0.6
Others	0	4,734	0.8
Total	11	603,053	

=== Bedfordshire ===
Party	Seats	Aggregate votes	
Party	Total	Total	Of all (%)
Conservative	3	163,239	50.4
Labour	3	136,304	42.0
Liberal Democrats	0	14,812	4.5
Green	0	6,054	1.9
UKIP	0	2,691	0.9
Others	0	1,128	0.4
Total	6	324,228	

=== Buckinghamshire ===
Party	Seats	Aggregate votes	
Party	Total	Total	Of all (%)
Conservative	6	190,171	47.0
Labour	0	118,614	29.3
Liberal Democrats	0	25,828	6.4
Green	0	16,335	4.0
UKIP	0	13,031	3.2
Speaker	1	34,299	8.5
Others	0	6,427	1.6
Total	7	404,705	

=== Berkshire ===
Party	Seats	Aggregate votes	
Party	Total	Total	Of all (%)
Conservative	6	242,350	53.9
Labour	2	147,763	32.8
Liberal Democrats	0	46,418	10.3
Green	0	7,309	1.6
UKIP	0	3,620	0.8
Others	0	2,430	0.5
Total	8	449,890	

=== Cambridgeshire ===
Party	Seats	Aggregate votes	
Party	Total	Total	Of all (%)
Conservative	5	203,492	49.8
Labour	2	138,135	33.8
Liberal Democrats	0	52,669	12.9
Green	0	6,999	1.7
UKIP	0	6,872	1.7
Others	0	426	0.1
Total	7	408,593	

=== Cheshire ===
Party	Seats	Aggregate votes	
Party	Total	Total	Of all (%)
Conservative	4	241,784	45.3
Labour	7	251,978	47.2
Liberal Democrats	0	22,706	4.3
Green	0	4,982	0.9
UKIP	0	8,153	1.5
Others	0	3,787	0.7
Total	11	533,390	

=== Cleveland ===
Party	Seats	Aggregate votes	
Party	Total	Total	Of all (%)
Conservative	1	102,434	38.8
Labour	5	142,025	53.8
Liberal Democrats	0	6,914	2.6
Green	0	979	0.4
UKIP	0	11,223	4.3
Others	0	632	0.2
Total	6	264,207	

=== Cumbria ===
Party	Seats	Aggregate votes	
Party	Total	Total	Of all (%)
Conservative	3	133,296	48.8
Labour	2	99,100	36.3
Liberal Democrats	1	32,398	11.9
Green	0	1,404	0.5
UKIP	0	6,209	2.3
Others	0	909	0.4
Total	6	273,406	

=== Cornwall ===
Party	Seats	Aggregate votes	
Party	Total	Total	Of all (%)
Conservative	6	152,428	48.4
Labour	0	83,968	26.8
Liberal Democrats	0	73,875	23.6
Green	0	3,218	1.0
UKIP	0	897	0.3
Others	0	323	0.1
Total	6	314,709	

=== Derbyshire ===
Party	Seats	Aggregate votes	
Party	Total	Total	Of all (%)
Conservative	6	263,537	48.7
Labour	5	240,408	44.4
Liberal Democrats	0	20,666	3.8
Green	0	6,362	1.1
UKIP	0	8,497	1.5
Others	0	1,352	0.3
Total	11	540,822	

=== Devon ===
Party	Seats	Aggregate votes	
Party	Total	Total	Of all (%)
Conservative	10	331,828	51.1
Labour	2	188,379	29.0
Liberal Democrats	0	80,968	12.5
Green	0	12,916	2.0
UKIP	0	10,922	1.7
Others	0	24,199	3.7
Total	12	649,212	

=== Dorset ===
Party	Seats	Aggregate votes	
Party	Total	Total	Of all (%)
Conservative	8	240,121	58.7
Labour	0	103,274	25.2
Liberal Democrats	0	52,395	12.8
Green	0	10,622	2.6
UKIP	0	1,405	0.3
Others	0	1,273	0.3
Total	8	409,090	

=== County Durham ===
Party	Seats	Aggregate votes	
Party	Total	Total	Of all (%)
Labour	7	166,840	54.6
Conservative	0	108,012	35.4
Liberal Democrats	0	13,630	4.5
Green	0	2,947	1.0
UKIP	0	10,344	3.4
Others	0	3,790	1.2
Total	7	305,563	

=== East Sussex ===
Party	Seats	Aggregate votes	
Party	Total	Total	Of all (%)
Conservative	4	199,786	44.3
Labour	2	145,236	32.2
Liberal Democrats	1	63,655	14.1
Green	1	35,027	7.8
UKIP	0	5,913	1.3
Others	0	1,187	0.3
Total	8	450,804	

=== Essex ===
Party	Seats	Aggregate votes	
Party	Total	Total	Of all (%)
Conservative	18	528,949	58.5
Labour	0	261,671	29.0
Liberal Democrats	0	52,691	5.8
Green	0	13,416	1.4
UKIP	0	41,478	4.6
Others	0	5,536	0.6
Total	18	903,741	

=== Gloucestershire ===
Party	Seats	Aggregate votes	
Party	Total	Total	Of all (%)
Conservative	5	182,875	52.9
Labour	1	99,260	28.7
Liberal Democrats	0	48,573	14.1
Green	0	7,684	2.2
UKIP	0	6,173	1.8
Others	0	887	0.3
Total	6	345,452	

=== Greater Manchester ===
Party	Seats	Aggregate votes	
Party	Total	Total	Of all (%)
Labour	23	719,372	56.9
Conservative	4	411,694	32.5
Liberal Democrats	0	77,621	6.1
Green	0	12,283	1.0
UKIP	0	35,738	2.8
Others	0	8,381	0.7
Total	27	1,265,089	

=== Hampshire ===
Party	Seats	Aggregate votes	
Party	Total	Total	Of all (%)
Conservative	17	566,993	56.2
Labour	2	265,692	26.3
Liberal Democrats	0	117,095	11.6
Green	0	31,912	3.2
UKIP	0	22,548	2.2
Others	0	5,016	0.5
Total	19	1,009,256	

=== Hereford and Worcester ===
Party	Seats	Aggregate votes	
Party	Total	Total	Of all (%)
Conservative	8	240,506	58.1
Labour	0	119,459	28.9
Liberal Democrats	0	25,547	6.2
Green	0	10,722	2.6
UKIP	0	8,796	2.1
Others	0	8,985	2.2
Total	8	414,016	

=== Hertfordshire ===
Party	Seats	Aggregate votes	
Party	Total	Total	Of all (%)
Conservative	11	327,740	54.3
Labour	0	193,822	32.1
Liberal Democrats	0	59,608	9.9
Green	0	14,015	2.3
UKIP	0	7,400	1.2
Others	0	1,049	0.2
Total	11	603,634	

=== Humberside ===
Party	Seats	Aggregate votes	
Party	Total	Total	Of all (%)
Conservative	5	212,940	48.7
Labour	5	184,463	42.4
Liberal Democrats	0	16,215	3.7
Green	0	4,819	1.1
UKIP	0	14,072	3.2
Others	0	4,767	1.1
Total	10	437,276	

=== Kent ===
Party	Seats	Aggregate votes	
Party	Total	Total	Of all (%)
Conservative	16	503,068	56.4
Labour	1	282,296	31.7
Liberal Democrats	0	49,153	5.5
Green	0	19,469	2.2
UKIP	0	31,732	3.6
Others	0	5,818	0.0
Total	17	891,536	

=== Lancashire ===
Party	Seats	Aggregate votes	
Party	Total	Total	Of all (%)
Labour	8	361,850	48.2
Conservative	8	337,794	45.0
Liberal Democrats	0	27,931	3.7
Green	0	9,385	1.2
UKIP	0	11,224	1.5
Others	0	2,203	0.3
Total	16	750,387	

=== Leicestershire and Rutland ===
Party	Seats	Aggregate votes	
Party	Total	Total	Of all (%)
Conservative	7	259,803	48.9
Labour	3	213,141	40.1
Liberal Democrats	0	34,975	6.6
Green	0	10,966	2.1
UKIP	0	9,807	1.8
Others	0	2,650	0.5
Total	10	531,342	

=== Lincolnshire ===
Party	Seats	Aggregate votes	
Party	Total	Total	Of all (%)
Conservative	6	227,103	61.6
Labour	1	105,177	28.5
Liberal Democrats	0	14,950	4.1
Green	0	5,012	1.4
UKIP	0	12,939	3.5
Others	0	3,317	0.9
Total	7	368,498	

=== Merseyside ===
Party	Seats	Aggregate votes	
Party	Total	Total	Of all (%)
Labour	14	514,266	71.2
Conservative	1	154,856	21.4
Liberal Democrats	0	30,774	4.3
Green	0	10,768	1.5
UKIP	0	7,622	1.1
Others	0	4,332	0.6
Total	15	722,618	

=== Norfolk ===
Party	Seats	Aggregate votes	
Party	Total	Total	Of all (%)
Conservative	7	246,380	52.7
Labour	1	156,248	33.4
Liberal Democrats	1	46,697	10.0
Green	0	7,333	1.6
UKIP	0	10,567	2.3
Others	0	340	0.1
Total	9	467,565	

=== Northamptonshire ===
Party	Seats	Aggregate votes	
Party	Total	Total	Of all (%)
Conservative	7	203,088	55.7
Labour	0	130,836	35.9
Liberal Democrats	0	15,003	4.1
Green	0	6,297	1.7
UKIP	0	9,193	2.5
Others	0	297	0.1
Total	7	364,714	

=== Northumberland ===
Party	Seats	Aggregate votes	
Party	Total	Total	Of all (%)
Conservative	2	76,899	44.4
Labour	2	74,232	42.8
Liberal Democrats	0	16,163	9.3
Green	0	3,673	2.1
UKIP	0	2,413	1.4
Others	0	0,000	0.0
Total	4	173,380	

=== North Yorkshire ===
Party	Seats	Aggregate votes	
Party	Total	Total	Of all (%)
Conservative	7	240,629	54.1
Labour	1	151,532	34.1
Liberal Democrats	0	32,560	7.3
Green	0	8,582	1.9
UKIP	0	4,927	1.1
Others	0	6,720	1.5
Total	8	444,860	

=== Nottinghamshire ===
Party	Seats	Aggregate votes	
Party	Total	Total	Of all (%)
Labour	6	265,073	48.0
Conservative	5	242,451	43.9
Liberal Democrats	0	16,018	2.9
Green	0	5,718	1.0
UKIP	0	15,922	2.9
Others	0	6,900	1.2
Total	11	552,082	

=== Oxfordshire ===
Party	Seats	Aggregate votes	
Party	Total	Total	Of all (%)
Conservative	4	172,709	48.4
Labour	1	104,812	29.4
Liberal Democrats	1	64,788	18.1
Green	0	7,473	2.1
UKIP	0	5,750	1.6
Others	0	1,574	0.4
Total	6	357,106	

=== Shropshire ===
Party	Seats	Aggregate votes	
Party	Total	Total	Of all (%)
Conservative	5	143,376	55.6
Labour	0	90,824	35.2
Liberal Democrats	0	14,837	5.6
Green	0	5,545	2.1
UKIP	0	3,019	1.2
Others	0	380	0.1
Total	5	257,981	

=== Somerset ===
Party	Seats	Aggregate votes	
Party	Total	Total	Of all (%)
Conservative	5	164,533	53.9
Liberal Democrats	0	77,655	25.4
Labour	0	51,897	17.0
Green	0	5,609	1.8
UKIP	0	3,536	1.2
Others	0	2,230	0.7
Total	5	305,460	

=== South Yorkshire ===
Party	Seats	Aggregate votes	
Party	Total	Total	Of all (%)
Labour	14	356,899	56.9
Conservative	0	186,515	29.8
Liberal Democrats	0	37,177	5.9
Green	0	7,792	1.2
UKIP	0	29,228	0.0
Others	0	9,101	1.5
Total	14	626,712	

=== Staffordshire ===
Party	Seats	Aggregate votes	
Party	Total	Total	Of all (%)
Conservative	9	313,321	56.3
Labour	3	210,791	37.9
Liberal Democrats	0	17,302	3.1
Green	0	8,456	1.5
UKIP	0	4,996	0.9
Others	0	1,734	0.3
Total	12	556,600	

=== Suffolk ===
Party	Seats	Aggregate votes	
Party	Total	Total	Of all (%)
Conservative	6	221,013	57.2
Labour	1	126,179	32.6
Liberal Democrats	0	17,577	4.5
Green	0	10,887	2.8
UKIP	0	8,785	2.3
Others	0	2,109	0.5
Total	7	386,550	

=== Surrey ===
Party	Seats	Aggregate votes	
Party	Total	Total	Of all (%)
Conservative	11	362,809	58.6
Labour	0	131,311	21.2
Liberal Democrats	0	82,540	13.3
Green	0	14,519	2.3
UKIP	0	12,370	2.0
Others	0	16,044	2.6
Total	11	619,593	

=== Tyne and Wear ===
Party	Seats	Aggregate votes	
Party	Total	Total	Of all (%)
Labour	12	326,641	60.8
Conservative	0	153,268	28.5
Liberal Democrats	0	21,702	4.0
Green	0	8,481	1.6
UKIP	0	25,368	4.7
Others	0	1,456	0.3
Total	12	536,916	

=== Warwickshire ===
Party	Seats	Aggregate votes	
Party	Total	Total	Of all (%)
Conservative	5	167,372	55.2
Labour	1	107,073	35.3
Liberal Democrats	0	18,881	6.2
Green	0	6,332	2.1
UKIP	0	3,347	1.1
Others	0	474	0.2
Total	6	303,479	

=== West Midlands (county) ===
Party	Seats	Aggregate votes	
Party	Total	Total	Of all (%)
Labour	20	646,938	52.4
Conservative	8	492,211	39.9
Liberal Democrats	0	45,719	3.7
Green	0	15,084	1.2
UKIP	0	30,481	2.5
Others	0	4,003	0.3
Total	28	1,234,436	

=== West Sussex ===
Party	Seats	Aggregate votes	
Party	Total	Total	Of all (%)
Conservative	8	257,464	56.8
Labour	0	130,656	28.8
Liberal Democrats	0	37,766	8.3
Green	0	11,829	2.6
UKIP	0	11,042	2.4
Others	0	4,281	0.9
Total	8	453,038	

=== West Yorkshire ===
Party	Seats	Aggregate votes	
Party	Total	Total	Of all (%)
Labour	17	584,018	53.3
Conservative	5	414,015	37.8
Liberal Democrats	0	43,735	4.0
Green	0	11,470	1.0
UKIP	0	19,574	1.8
Others	0	23,301	2.1
Total	22	1,096,113	

=== Wiltshire ===
Party	Seats	Aggregate votes	
Party	Total	Total	Of all (%)
Conservative	7	213,442	56.8
Labour	0	102,818	27.4
Liberal Democrats	0	44,247	11.8
Green	0	6,949	1.8
UKIP	0	6,623	1.8
Others	0	1,604	0.4
Total	7	375,683	

== Donations ==
Electoral commission data shows that in 2017 Q2, total donations for each major political party, over £7,500, are as follows:

Party	Donations
Conservative	£25,346,680
Labour	£9,745,745
Liberal Democrats	£5,058,175

== See also ==
- 2017 United Kingdom general election in Northern Ireland
- 2017 United Kingdom general election in Scotland
- 2017 United Kingdom general election in Wales
