= 2018 Southampton City Council election =

2018 UK local government election

← 2016	3 May 2018	2019 →

16 of the 48 seats to Southampton City Council 25 seats needed for a majority
- Turnout: 32.1%
	First party	Second party	Third party
Leader	Simon Letts	Jeremy Moulton
Party	Labour	Conservative	Independent
Leader's seat	Bitterne (defeated)	Freemantle (defeated)
Seats won	8	7	1
Seats after	25	19	4
Seat change	Steady	Steady	Steady
Popular vote	23,524	20,733	3,045
Percentage	41.4%	36.5%	5.3%
Swing	▲7.1%	▲5.4%	▲1.8%
- Map showing the election results. Each ward represents 1 seat
Majority party before election
Labour
Majority party after election
Labour

Elections to Southampton City Council took place on Thursday 3 May 2018, alongside nationwide local elections, alongside other local elections across the country. The elections saw no changes in the overall composition of the Council, however saw seats being exchanged. The Labour Party lost Bitterne, Millbrook and Peartree to the Conservative Party while the Conservatives lost Freemantle, Portswood and Swaythling to Labour. This led to the Labour leader of the council, Simon Letts, and the leader of the Conservative group in the city, Jeremy Moulton, losing their seats.

== Background and campaigning ==
In the lead up to the election, the BBC had summarised that the situation in Southampton for the Labour Party was incredibly precarious and one seat loss could deprive the party of a majority. They cited the Redbridge ward as a target for the main opposition the Conservatives, yet the Conservatives came third to the Southampton Independents candidate. Labour targeted the Conservative seats of Freemantle, Portswood and Swaythling, as well as the independent Coxford ward.

Labour made a commitment to building 1,000 homes in the city over five years, invest further in council services, build a modular home factory and create a Clean Air Zone for the city. The Conservative Party offered a series of policies to tackle air pollution and traffic in the city: suggesting two new railway stations in the city, one at St Mary's Stadium and one in Ocean Village potentially where the old Southampton Terminus Station was, allow free parking for electric vehicles and introducing more electric charge points in the city. The Liberal Democrats focused on the quality of roads within the city and was sceptical of the way resources were used by the Labour administration to tackle homelessness in the city.

The council had come under scrutiny for its decision to close the Kentish Road respite centre, which was due to budget cuts. Activists Lisa Stead and Amanda Guest, who have campaigned on the issue, stood in Bitterne and Shirely, respectively, with the 'Putting People First' group on the council. The Conservatives committed to fully reopening the respite centre.

== Election results ==
=== Overall election result ===
As the council is elected in thirds, one councillor for each of the 16 wards are elected each year. All comparisons in seats and swing are to the corresponding Southampton Council election, 2014.

Southampton City Council election result 2018
Party	Seats	Gains	Losses	Net gain/loss	Seats %	Votes %	Votes	+/−
Labour	8	3	3	Steady	56.25	41.4	23,524	▲7.1
Conservative	7	3	3	Steady	37.50	36.5	20,733	▲5.4
Independent	1	0	0	Steady	6.25	5.3	3,045	▲1.8
Liberal Democrats	0	0	0	Steady	0.00	7.2	4,122	▲0.2
Green	0	0	0	Steady	0.00	5.2	2,989	▼0.2
TUSC	0	0	0	Steady	0.00	0.5	275	▼2.3
UKIP	0	0	0	Steady	0.00	0.1	92	▼15.0

=== Changes in council composition ===
Party	Previous council	New council	+/-
Labour	25	25	0
Conservatives	19	19	0
Putting People First	3	3	0
Southampton Independents	1	1	0
Total	48	48	
Working majority	2	2	

== Ward results ==
Bargate
Party	Candidate	Votes	%	±%
Labour	Sarah Jane Bogle	1,668	56.6	+10.1
Conservative	Edward James Osmond	827	28.1	−3.3
Liberal Democrats	Ben Curd	204	6.9	+1.9
Green	Joe Cox	184	6.2	−1.8
TUSC	Diane Lesley Cook	63	2.1	N/A
Majority		841		
Turnout		2,957	24.7	
Labour hold		Swing		

Bassett
Party	Candidate	Votes	%	±%
Conservative	Beryl May Harris	1,682	49.9	+2.5
Labour	Sally Victoria Spicer	965	28.6	+5.4
Liberal Democrats	Richard Blackman	464	13.8	+2.2
Green	Alan Jack French	263	7.8	+1.1
Majority		717		
Turnout		3,384	33.9	
Conservative hold		Swing		

Bevois
Party	Candidate	Votes	%	±%
Labour	Toqeer Ahmed Kataria	2,260	73.3	+4.1
Conservative	Diana June Galton	417	13.5	+1.7
Green	Ronald Nicholas Meldrum	233	7.6	−
Liberal Democrats	Vijay Chopra	173	5.6	+1.5
Majority		1,843		
Turnout		3,096	28.4	
Labour hold		Swing		

Bitterne
Party	Candidate	Votes	%	±%
Conservative	Terry Michael Streets	1,528	49.5	+21.4
Labour	Simon Letts	1,233	39.9	−1.3
Liberal Democrats	Olivia Caitlin Reed	118	3.8	−0.9
Green	Duncan Robert McMillan	114	3.7	−0.9
Independent	Lisa Joanne Stead	96	3.1	N/A
Majority		295		
Turnout		3,094	30.9	
Conservative gain from Labour		Swing		

Bitterne Park
Party	Candidate	Votes	%	±%
Conservative	Rob Harwood	1,914	47.8	+5.8
Labour	Ashley Mark Minto	1,525	38.1	+1.4
Green	Jenny Barnes	297	7.4	−2.9
Liberal Democrats	James Arnold Read	266	6.6	−1.2
Majority		389		
Turnout		4,015	38.2	
Conservative hold		Swing		

Coxford
Party	Candidate	Votes	%	±%
Independent	Keith Morrell	1,595	46.9	+8.3
Labour	Matt Renyard	958	28.2	+1.1
Conservative	Trevor Glasspool	559	16.5	+4.9
Liberal Democrats	Peter Galton	103	3.0	−0.3
Green	Lucy Michelle Mundell	101	3.0	+0.9
Independent	Ricky Lambert	82	2.4	N/A
Majority		637		
Turnout		3,403		
Independent gain from Labour		Swing		

Freemantle
Party	Candidate	Votes	%	±%
Labour	Steve Leggett	1,704	45.0	−2.3
Conservative	Jeremy Richard Moulton	1,484	39.2	+8.2
Liberal Democrats	Alexander Clifton-Melhuish	217	5.7	+0.5
Green	Lindsey Cherrie Hood	185	4.9	−2.6
Protest Against Brexit	Ed Thompson	167	4.4	N/A
TUSC	Mike Marx	28	0.7	N/A
Majority		220		
Turnout		3,792	34.1	
Labour gain from Conservative		Swing		

Harefield
Party	Candidate	Votes	%	±%
Conservative	Val Laurent	2,015	52.7	+5.0
Labour	Alan Lloyd	1,401	36.6	+3.7
Independent	Peter Alexander Virgo	148	3.9	N/A
Green	Chris Bluemel	136	3.6	−4.1
Liberal Democrats	Colin Stuart McDougall	123	3.2	−3.2
Majority		614		
Turnout		3,833	36.7	
Conservative hold		Swing		

Millbrook
Party	Candidate	Votes	%	±%
Conservative	Steven Graham Patrick Galton	1,694	44.3	+7.9
Labour	Mike Denness	1,631	42.6	+1.2
Liberal Democrats	Andrew Thomas Beal	159	4.2	−0.4
Green	Daniel Payne	158	4.1	−0.1
UKIP	Pearline Hingston	92	2.4	−9.7
Independent	Ed Edworthy	91	2.4	N/A
Majority		63		
Turnout		3,828	34.5	
Conservative gain from Labour		Swing		

Peartree
Party	Candidate	Votes	%	±%
Conservative	Tom Bell	1,725	46.5	+14.5
Labour	Catherine Rendle	1,579	42.6	−2.4
Liberal Democrats	Eileen Bowers	219	5.9	+1.0
Green	Nick Mabey	142	3.8	−0.6
TUSC	Declan Peter Clune	44	1.2	+0.6
Majority		146		
Turnout		3,717	35.5	
Conservative gain from Labour		Swing		

Portswood
Party	Candidate	Votes	%	±%
Labour	Lisa Mitchell	1,587	42.4	+9.1
Liberal Democrats	Adrian Ford	923	24.7	−0.1
Conservative	Paul Nicholas O'Neill	851	22.8	−2.8
Green	Katherine Barbour	348	9.3	−0.1
TUSC	Nick Chaffey	31	0.8	−0.2
Majority		664		
Turnout		3,748	35.6	
Labour gain from Conservative		Swing		

Redbridge
Party	Candidate	Votes	%	±%
Labour	Cathie McEwing	1,181	38.5	−7.9
Southampton Independents	Denise Mary Elizabeth Wyatt	982	32.0	+18.4
Conservative	Matthew Robert Cowley	583	19.0	+4.6
UKIP	Richard John Lyons	124	4.0	−15.4
Liberal Democrats	Simon Stokes	99	3.2	−0.1
Green	Christopher Richard James	96	3.1	+0.6
Majority		199		
Turnout		3,075	28	
Labour hold		Swing		

Shirley
Party	Candidate	Votes	%	±%
Labour	Hannah Coombs	1,952	48.0	+1.8
Conservative	Matt Turpin	1,244	30.6	+3.3
Liberal Democrats	Steven Hulbert	440	10.8	+4.8
Green	John Spottiswoode	204	5.0	+0.3
Independent	Amanda Jane Guest	123	3.0	N/A
UKIP	Nick Ray	107	2.6	−7.5
Majority		708		
Turnout		4,076	38.7	
Labour hold		Swing		

Sholing
Party	Candidate	Votes	%	±%
Conservative	Marley George Guthrie	2,093	56.1	+15.8
Labour	Andy Frampton	1,323	35.5	−0.4
Liberal Democrats	James Cappleman	162	4.3	+1.2
Green	Lyn Hazel Brayshaw	153	4.1	+0.8
Majority		770		
Turnout		3,741	34.9	
Conservative hold		Swing		

Swaythling
Party	Candidate	Votes	%	±%
Labour	Lorna Fielker	1,062	42.8	−4.8
Conservative	Bob Painton	956	38.5	+9.7
Liberal Democrats	Paul Alexander Clarke	275	11.1	+2.6
Green	Angela Cotton	191	7.7	−2.3
Majority		106		
Turnout		2,490	28.8	
Labour gain from Conservative		Swing		

Woolston
Party	Candidate	Votes	%	±%
Labour	Christopher Hammond	1,495	49.0	−1.3
Conservative	Matthew Thomas Jones	1,161	38.0	+13.2
Green	Clive George Hillman	148	4.8	−2.8
Liberal Democrats	Samuel David Harris	141	4.6	−5.0
TUSC	Susan Ann Atkins	109	3.6	−4.0
Majority		334		
Turnout		3,063	28.6	
Labour hold		Swing		
