= 2017 United Kingdom general election in Scotland =

- 8 June 2017

All 59 Scottish seats to the House of Commons
- Turnout: 66.4%, ▼4.7%
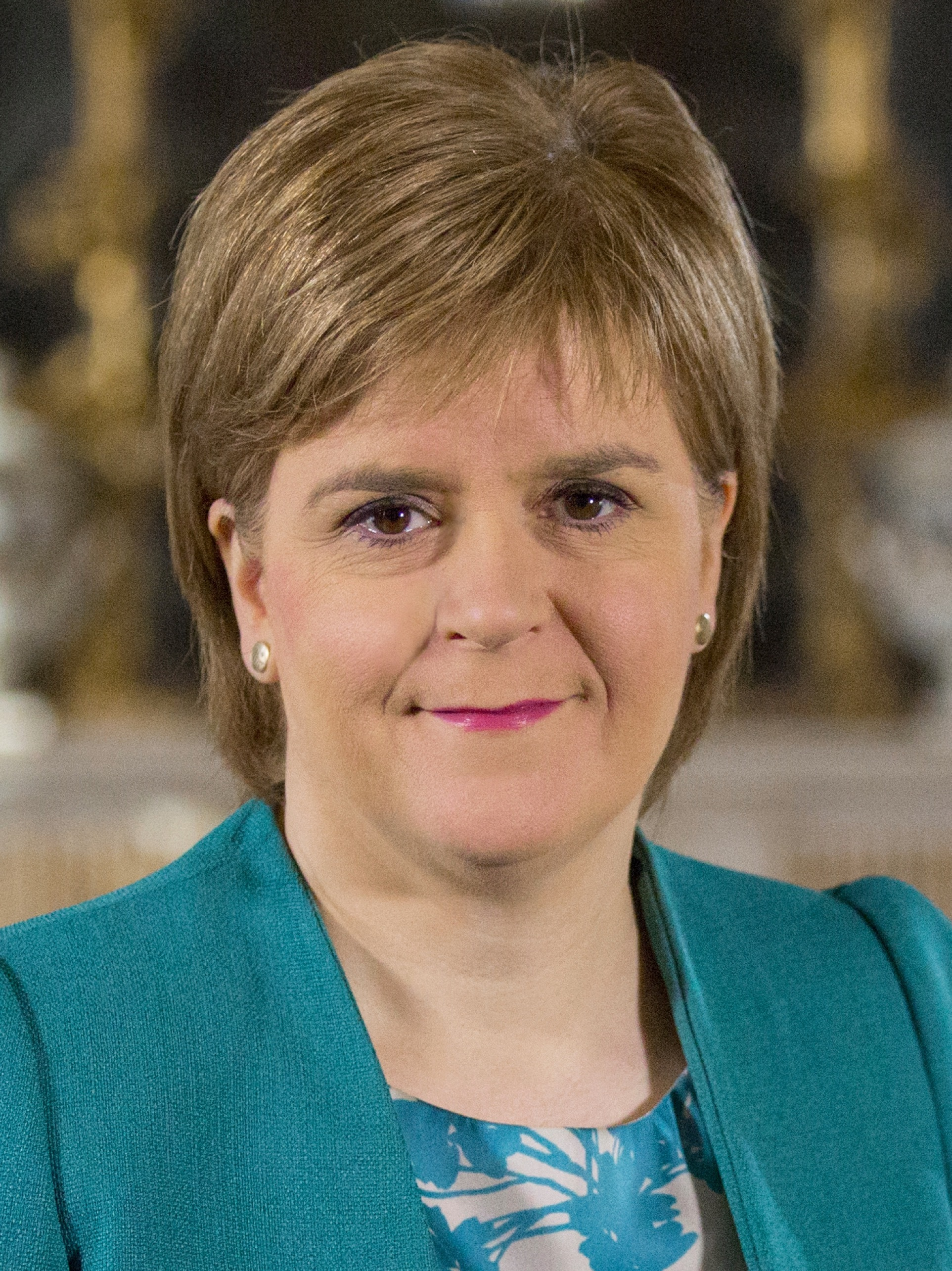

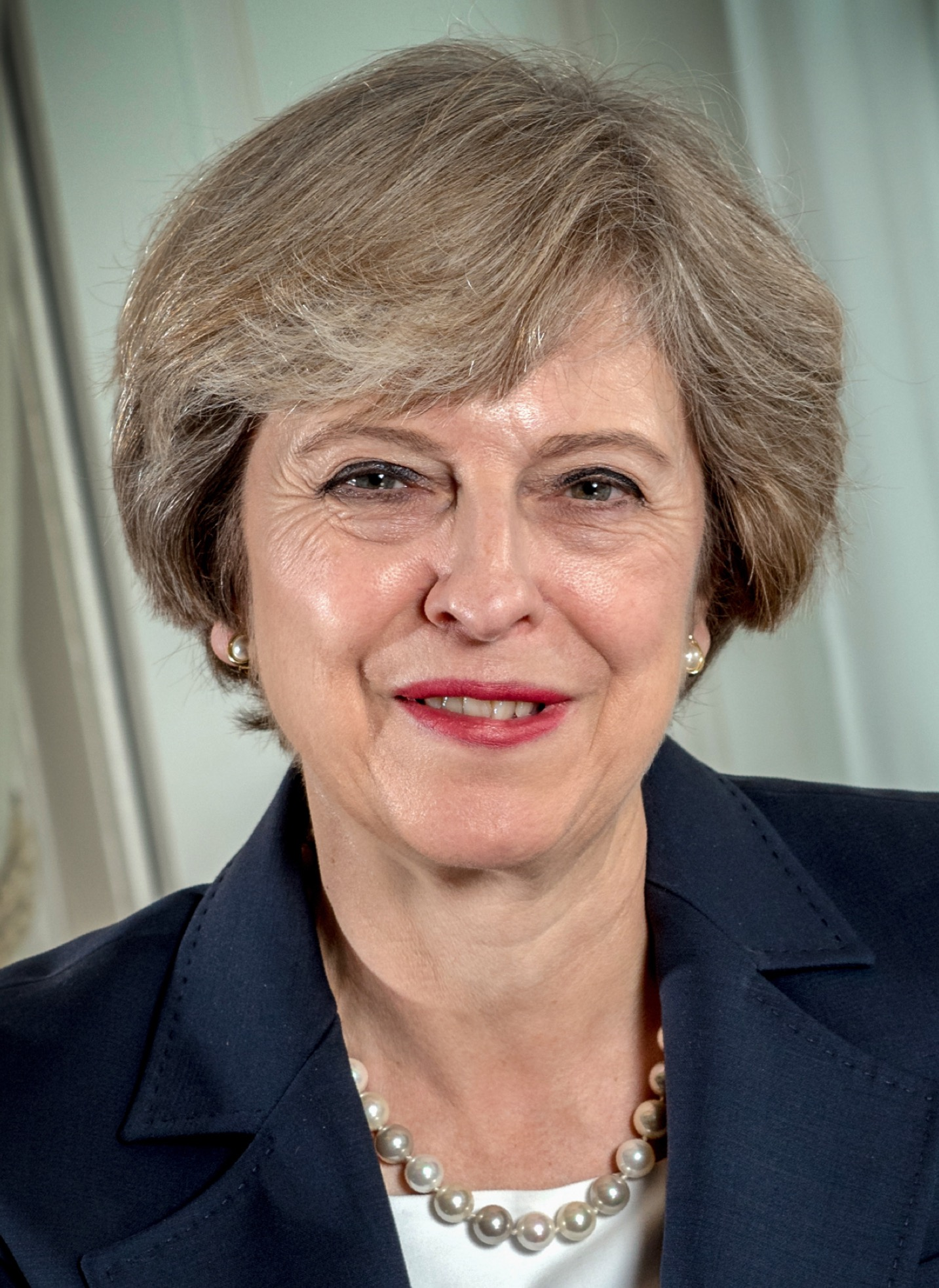

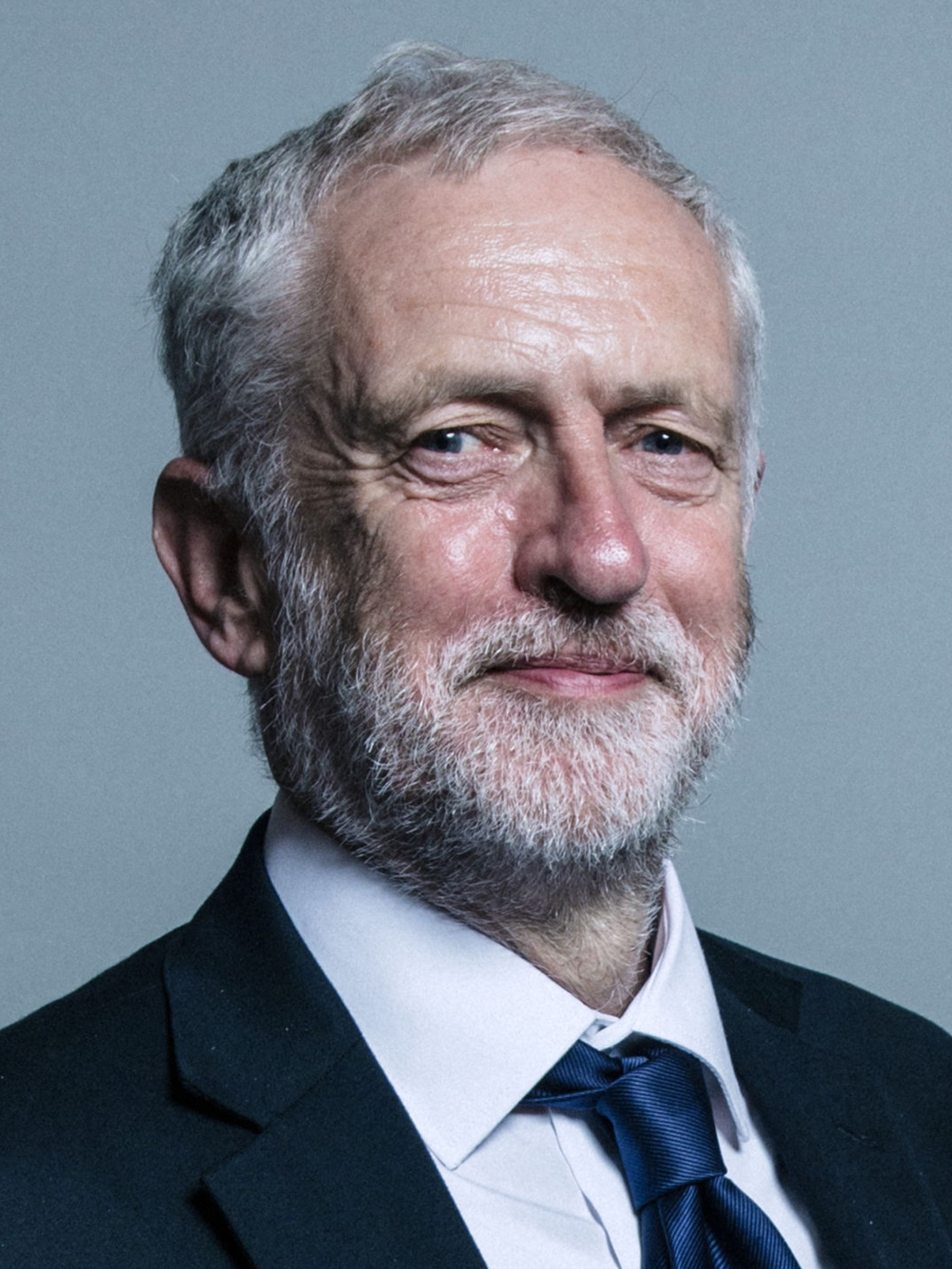

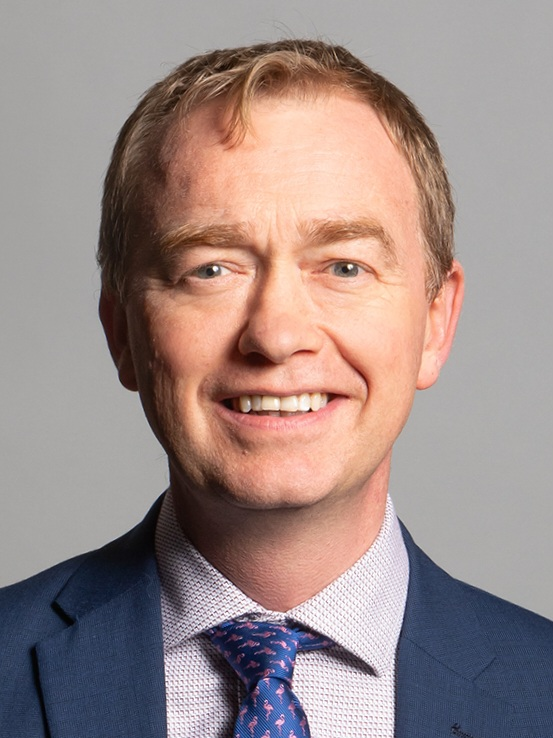
	First party	Second party
Leader	Nicola Sturgeon	Theresa May
Party	SNP	Conservative
Leader since	14 November 2014	11 July 2016
Leader's seat	Did not stand	Maidenhead
Last election	56 seats, 50.0%	1 seat, 14.9%
Seats before	54	1
Seats won	35	13
Seat change	▼21	▲12
Popular vote	977,569	757,949
Percentage	36.9%	28.6%
Swing	▼13.1 pp	▲13.7 pp
	Third party	Fourth party
Leader	Jeremy Corbyn	Tim Farron
Party	Labour	Liberal Democrats
Leader since	12 September 2015	16 July 2015
Leader's seat	Islington North	Westmorland and Lonsdale
Last election	1 seat, 24.3%	1 seat, 7.5%
Seats before	1	1
Seats won	7	4
Seat change	▲6	▲3
Popular vote	717,007	179,061
Percentage	27.1%	6.8%
Swing	▲2.8 pp	▼0.8 pp
- Coloured according to the winning party's vote share in each constituency

A general election was held in the United Kingdom on Thursday 8 June 2017; all 59 seats in Scotland were contested under the first-past-the-post electoral system.

The general election in Scotland was fought in the aftermath of the 2016 Scottish Parliament election, in which the Scottish National Party (SNP) won a third term in government but lost its overall majority in the Scottish Parliament. At that election, the Scottish Conservatives increased their number of MSPs, overtaking Labour as the largest opposition party. The 2016 EU referendum was held a month later on Thursday 23 June, and the final result was for the United Kingdom to leave the EU; despite Scotland voting 62.0% for 'Remain'. Negotiations were due to begin shortly since invocation of Article 50 of the Treaty on European Union in March 2017, which was expected to dominate the snap general election campaign.

In line with the Fixed-term Parliaments Act 2011, an election had not been due until 7 May 2020, but a call for a snap election by Prime Minister Theresa May received the necessary two-thirds majority in a 522–13 vote in the House of Commons on 19 April 2017. The Conservative Party, which has governed nationally since 2010, was defending a majority of 17 against the Labour Party, the official opposition. The third-largest party was the SNP, which had won 56 of the 59 Scottish seats at the 2015 general election.

The election resulted in the SNP remaining the largest single party in Scotland, despite losing 21 seats to pro-union candidates. This marked a 13% drop in support for the SNP, down to 36.9% of the vote. The Conservatives, at 28.6%, doubled their share of the vote and won 13 seats, while Labour won seven seats and the Liberal Democrats four seats. The Conservatives recorded their best result in Scotland since 1983 (in terms of seats won) or 1979 (in terms of share of the popular vote). Until this election the Conservatives had not been the second-largest party in Scotland since 1992 and had not been the largest unionist party in Scotland since 1955.

Defeated SNP MPs included: former SNP leader and former First Minister of Scotland Alex Salmond, SNP Westminster leader Angus Robertson, SNP Chief Whip Mike Weir; as well as John Nicolson and Tasmina Ahmed-Sheikh. Commentators suggested that the election might reduce the SNP's case for a second referendum on Scottish independence. Following the election, the SNP leader Nicola Sturgeon acknowledged that her party's plans for a second referendum were 'undoubtedly' a factor in the election results. The SNP also abandoned its fundraiser for a possible referendum after raising only half of its £1,000,000 target, just over a week before its preset deadline.

== Political context ==
Following a referendum held on Scottish independence in 2014 which saw 44.7% of voters in Scotland vote for Scotland to become an independent state and 55.3% vote for Scotland to remain a part of the United Kingdom, the SNP won 56 of the 59 UK Parliamentary seats in Scotland at the 2015 UK general election, campaigning on a manifesto focusing on bringing greater devolved powers to Scotland following a promise made by the three main unionist parties in Scotland to bring more devolved powers to the country should it reject independence. The SNP manifesto at the 2015 general election repeatedly stated that "The SNP will always support independence - but that is not what this election is about".

Labour only returned a single MP at Edinburgh South; a reduction of 40 seats compared to the previous election. The party lost out heavily to the SNP in working-class areas around the Scottish Central Belt, with Scottish Labour's safest constituency (Glasgow North East) returning the largest swing at the general election for any seat in the UK with 39.3% from Labour to SNP. The party performed best in more affluent constituencies, with then-Scottish Labour leader Jim Murphy missing out in his former constituency of East Renfrewshire by just 3,718 votes. Labour's next closest result was at Edinburgh North and Leith, where they missed out to the SNP by 5,597 votes, and in East Lothian, where the SNP polled ahead of Labour by 6,803 votes.

The Scottish Liberal Democrats lost 10 of their 11 Westminster seats from 2010, with their safest seat in the UK - Orkney and Shetland - remaining as the only Liberal Democrat seat in Scotland. They marginally lost out to the SNP in East Dunbartonshire, where former Lib Dem MP Jo Swinson lost out to the SNP by 2,167 votes. Among those to lose their seat at the election were: former Liberal Democrat leader Charles Kennedy and the Chief Secretary to the Treasury, Danny Alexander. The Liberal Democrats finished in third place at Berwickshire, Roxburgh and Selkirk and West Aberdeenshire and Kincardine, seats which they had held at the previous election.

The Scottish Conservative Party had not held a majority of Scottish seats at a general election since 1955 and lost all Scottish representation at the 1997 general election. Since 2001, the party had held only one Scottish seat in the House of Commons. In 2005, following the re-organisation of Scottish constituencies, that seat was Dumfriesshire, Clydesdale and Tweeddale, a mostly rural constituency near the Scottish Borders. In 2015, its share of the vote in Scotland decreased by 1.8% but managed to retain Dumfriesshire, Clydesdale and Tweeddale, as its only Scottish seat. It had been reported the party could gain Berwickshire, Roxburgh and Selkirk, a seat which they lost out to the Scottish National Party by a meagre 0.6% of the vote.

The SNP polled slightly under half of the votes, 49.97%, in Scotland at the 2015 general election; the largest vote share at a general election in Scotland for a party since the Conservatives won a majority of the popular vote, 50.1%, in 1955.

The impact of the 2016 EU referendum and a proposed second Scottish independence referendum was a large theme at the snap 2017 general election. The SNP incorrectly predicted that many pro-union voters would switch allegiance to the party in order to remain within the European Union. Polling from YouGov suggests people moving towards independence as a result of Brexit would be offset by the number of previously pro-independence Leave voters saying they would vote against independence as a result of Brexit.

A study by Electoral Calculus, published on 14 May 2017, concluded that the Conservatives could win 11 seats in Scotland.

== Campaign events ==
=== Television debates ===
Like the rest of the United Kingdom, Scottish broadcasters hosted television debates. On 21 May, BBC Scotland announced that they would host a debate on 10 December, two days before the election, which was moderated by Sarah Smith. On 6 June, two days before the election, STV hosted a television debate from the Tramway theatre in Glasgow with the four main Scottish leaders. It was originally due to be held the week before but this was postponed until Tuesday 6 June. The debate was moderated by Bernard Ponsonby.

United Kingdom general election debates, 2017
Date	Organisers	Venue	P Present S Surrogate NI Non-invitee A Absent invitee					
Date	Organisers	Venue	Cons.	Labour	SNP	Lib. Dem.	Green	UKIP
21 May	BBC Scotland	Edinburgh	P Davidson	P Dugdale	P Sturgeon	P Rennie	P Harvie	P Coburn
5 June	BBC (Question Time)	Edinburgh	NI	NI	P Sturgeon	P Farron	NI	NI
6 June	STV	Glasgow	P Davidson	P Dugdale	P Sturgeon	P Rennie	NI	NI

== Results ==
Party	Seats					Aggregate votes		
Party	Total	Gains	Losses	Net	Of all (%)	Total	Of all (%)	Difference
SNP	35	0	21	▼21	59.3	977,568	36.9	▼13.1
Conservative	13	12	0	▲12	22.0	757,949	28.6	▲13.7
Labour	7	6	0	▲6	11.9	717,007	27.1	▲2.8
Liberal Democrats	4	3	0	▲3	6.8	179,062	6.8	▼0.8
Green	0	0	0	Steady	—	5,886	0.2	▼1.1
UKIP	0	0	0	Steady	—	5,302	0.2	▼1.4
Others	0	0	0	Steady	—	6,921	0.3	▲0.2
Total	59					2,649,695	66.4	▼4.7

2017 map of Scottish Constituencies - Results

=== Votes summary ===
Popular vote
SNP	36.9%
Conservative	28.6%
Labour	27.1%
Liberal Democrats	6.8%
Greens	0.2%
UKIP	0.2%
Other	0.2%

Parliament seats
SNP	59.3%
Conservative	22.0%
Labour	11.9%
Liberal Democrats	6.8%

=== List of Constituencies by Party ===
2017 UK General Election (Scottish Westminster Constituencies)
Party	Constituency
SNP	Aberdeen North; Airdrie and Shotts; Argyll and Bute; Central Ayrshire; Cumbernauld, Kilsyth and Kirkintilloch East; Dundee East; Dundee West; Dunfermline and West Fife; East Kilbride, Strathaven and Lesmahagow; Edinburgh East; Edinburgh North and Leith; Edinburgh South West; Falkirk; Glasgow Central; Glasgow East; Glasgow North; Glasgow North West; Glasgow South; Glasgow South West; Glenrothes; Inverclyde; Inverness, Nairn, Badenoch and Strathspey; Kilmarnock and Loudoun; Lanark and Hamilton East; Linlithgow and East Falkirk; Livingston; Motherwell and Wishaw; Na h-Eileanan an Iar; North Ayrshire and Arran; North East Fife; Paisley and Renfrewshire North; Paisley and Renfrewshire South; Perth and North Perthshire; Ross, Skye and Lochaber; West Dunbartonshire
Conservative	Aberdeen South; Angus; Ayr, Carrick and Cumnock; Banff and Buchan; Berwickshire, Roxburgh and Selkirk; Dumfries and Galloway; Dumfriesshire, Clydesdale and Tweeddale; East Renfrewshire; Gordon; Moray; Ochil and South Perthshire; Stirling; West Aberdeenshire and Kincardine
Labour	Coatbridge, Chryston and Bellshill; East Lothian; Edinburgh South; Glasgow North East; Kirkcaldy and Cowdenbeath; Midlothian; Rutherglen and Hamilton West
Liberal Democrats	Caithness, Sutherland and Easter Ross; East Dunbartonshire; Edinburgh West; Orkney and Shetland

=== Description of results ===
At the election the SNP remained the largest party in Scotland, taking the vast majority of seats situated around the more industrial Central Belt of the country, between Balloch, Dundee, Irvine, Kilmarnock and Livingston, where the campaign in favour of Scottish independence performed best at the 2014 independence referendum. The party also took the most votes and a majority of seats in three out of four major cities in Scotland (Dundee, Glasgow and Edinburgh), however Labour were within 1,200 votes of taking the most votes in Edinburgh and were within 200 votes of gaining two additional seats in Glasgow. The SNP failed to win a majority of the vote in any of Scotland's 59 constituencies.

The Scottish Conservatives performed best in areas where the campaign in favour of remaining part of the United Kingdom performed best in at the 2014 independence referendum and in areas where the campaign to leave the European Union performed best in at the 2016 EU membership referendum. The Conservatives formed the largest party in the south of the country through Dumfries and Galloway, the Scottish Borders and South Ayrshire, where they won four seats in total. They also gained the East Renfrewshire constituency, an affluent commuter suburb on the outskirts of Glasgow which was the safest Conservative constituency in Scotland before their collapse at the 1997 general election, and gained the Ochil and South Perthshire and Stirling constituencies in Central Scotland, coming within 21 votes of gaining Perth and North Perthshire, the second closest result in Scotland and the third closest across the United Kingdom as a whole. Six out of seven constituencies in the North-East of Scotland voted Conservative, including former SNP party leader and First Minister of Scotland Alex Salmond's constituency of Gordon, and the SNP Westminster leader Angus Robertson's seat of Moray. Two out of three seats covering the city of Aberdeen returned Conservative MP's. In a profile of the seat of Moray for The Guardian after the election, journalist Severin Carrell summarised the result: "Moray had been an SNP seat for 30 years but... using Brexit as the basis for a second independence vote so soon after 2014 crystallised an irritation with the party brewing for several years. The Tory cry that Sturgeon needed “to get on with the day job” resonated."

Scottish Labour retained their Edinburgh South constituency with a significant majority of 15,514 votes (32.4%), making it the safest constituency in Scotland. They also regained a number of previously safe Labour working-class constituencies in the Central Belt of Scotland, including Coatbridge, Chryston and Bellshill, Glasgow North East, Kirkcaldy and Cowdenbeath and Rutherglen and Hamilton West, gaining a further two seats in Lothian (East Lothian and Midlothian). The party were within 1,400 votes of gaining a further six seats from the SNP in Greater Glasgow.

The Liberal Democrats gained the suburban constituencies of East Dunbartonshire and Edinburgh West on the outskirts of Glasgow and Edinburgh respectively. The party also regained their former heartland of Caithness, Sutherland and Easter Ross, a large rural constituency covering the northernmost parts of Great Britain, with Orkney and Shetland again becoming the safest Lib Dem constituency in the UK in vote share terms, with a majority 19.6% of the vote. They lost out to the SNP in the North East Fife constituency by just 2 votes (0.0%), the closest result in the United Kingdom at a general election since the result in Winchester in 1997. However, the party's vote collapsed to the Conservatives in Aberdeenshire, the Borders and in parts of the Highlands.

== Target seats ==
=== Scottish Conservatives ===
Rank	Constituency	Winning party 2015	Swing Required	Conservatives' place 2015	Result
1	Berwickshire, Roxburgh and Selkirk	SNP	0.3%	2nd	Conservative
2	Dumfries & Galloway	SNP	5.8%	2nd	Conservative
3	West Aberdeenshire and Kincardine	SNP	6.4%	2nd	Conservative
4	Perth and North Perthshire	SNP	9.0%	2nd	SNP
5	Moray	SNP	9.2%	2nd	Conservative
6	East Renfrewshire	SNP	9.3%	3rd	Conservative
7	Aberdeen South	SNP	9.4%	3rd	Conservative
8	Edinburgh South	Labour	10.8%	3rd	Labour
9	Stirling	SNP	11.3%	3rd	Conservative
10	Edinburgh South West	SNP	11.4%	3rd	SNP
11	East Lothian	SNP	11.5%	3rd	Labour
12	North East Fife	SNP	12.4%	3rd	SNP
13	Edinburgh North and Leith	SNP	12.4%	3rd	SNP
14	Angus	SNP	12.6%	2nd	Conservative
15	Ochil and South Perthshire	SNP	12.6%	3rd	Conservative
16	Edinburgh West	SNP	13.3%	3rd	Liberal Democrats
17	East Dunbartonshire	SNP	14.4%	3rd	Liberal Democrats
18	Ayr, Carrick and Cumnock	SNP	14.5%	3rd	Conservative
19	Argyll and Bute	SNP	14.7%	3rd	SNP
20	Banff and Buchan	SNP	15.7%	2nd	Conservative
21	Lanark and Hamilton East	SNP	16.5%	3rd	SNP
22	Central Ayrshire	SNP	17.9%	3rd	SNP
23	Gordon	SNP	18.0%	3rd	Conservative

=== Scottish Labour ===
Rank	Constituency	Winning party 2015	Swing Required	Labour's place 2015	Result
1	East Renfrewshire	SNP	3.3%	2nd	Conservative
2	Edinburgh North and Leith	SNP	4.8%	2nd	SNP
3	East Lothian	SNP	5.8%	2nd	Labour
4	Paisley and Renfrewshire South	SNP	6.2%	2nd	SNP
5	Aberdeen South	SNP	7.5%	2nd	Conservative
6	Edinburgh South West	SNP	7.9%	2nd	SNP
7	Dumfries and Galloway	SNP	8.4%	3rd	Conservative
8	Rutherglen and Hamilton West	SNP	8.7%	2nd	Labour
9	Ochil and South Perthshire	SNP	8.8%	2nd	Conservative
10	Paisley and Renfrewshire North	SNP	9.1%	2nd	SNP
11	Lanark and Hamilton East	SNP	9.1%	2nd	SNP
12	Dunfermline and West Fife	SNP	9.3%	2nd	SNP
13	Kirkcaldy and Cowdenbeath	SNP	9.4%	2nd	Labour
14	Edinburgh East	SNP	9.7%	2nd	SNP
15	Glasgow Central	SNP	9.8%	2nd	SNP
16	Airdrie and Shotts	SNP	9.9%	2nd	SNP
17	Stirling	SNP	10.1%	2nd	Conservative
18	Midlothian	SNP	10.2%	2nd	Labour
19	Linlithgow and Falkirk East	SNP	10.5%	2nd	SNP
20	Ayr, Carrick and Cumnock	SNP	10.8%	2nd	Conservative
21	Coatbridge, Chryston and Bellshill	SNP	11.3%	2nd	Labour
22	Dumfriesshire, Clydesdale and Tweeddale	Conservative	11.7%	3rd	Conservative
23	Glasgow North West	SNP	11.9%	2nd	SNP
24	Glasgow East	SNP	12.2%	2nd	SNP
25	Glasgow North East	SNP	12.3%	2nd	Labour

=== Scottish Liberal Democrats ===
Rank	Constituency	Winning party 2015	Swing Required	Liberal Democrats' place 2015	Result
1	East Dunbartonshire	SNP	2.0%	2nd	Liberal Democrats
2	Edinburgh West	SNP	2.9%	2nd	Liberal Democrats
3	North East Fife	SNP	4.9%	2nd	SNP
4	Caithness, Sutherland and Easter Ross	SNP	5.7%	2nd	Liberal Democrats
5	Ross, Skye and Lochaber	SNP	6.1%	2nd	SNP
6	Gordon	SNP	7.5%	2nd	Conservative

=== Scottish National Party ===
Rank	Constituency	Winning party 2015	Swing Required	SNP's place 2015	Result
1	Dumfriesshire, Clydesdale and Tweeddale	Conservative	0.8%	2nd	Conservative
2	Orkney and Shetland	Liberal Democrats	1.8%	2nd	Liberal Democrats
3	Edinburgh South	Labour	2.7%	2nd	Labour

== See also ==
- 2017 United Kingdom general election in England
- 2017 United Kingdom general election in Northern Ireland
- 2017 United Kingdom general election in Wales
