= 2017 United Kingdom general election in Wales =

- 8 June 2017

All 40 Welsh seats to the House of Commons
- Turnout: 68.6% (▲2.9%)
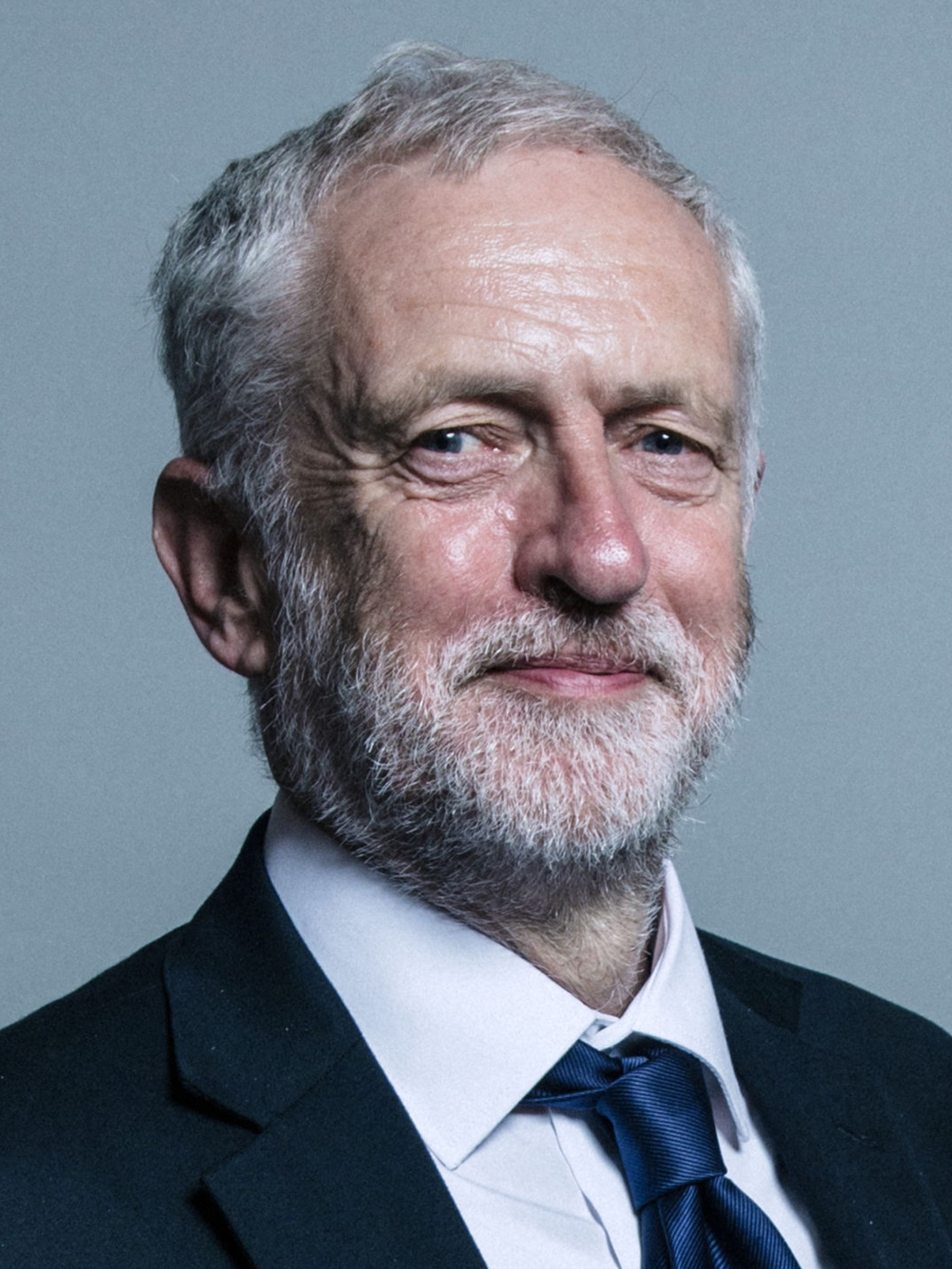

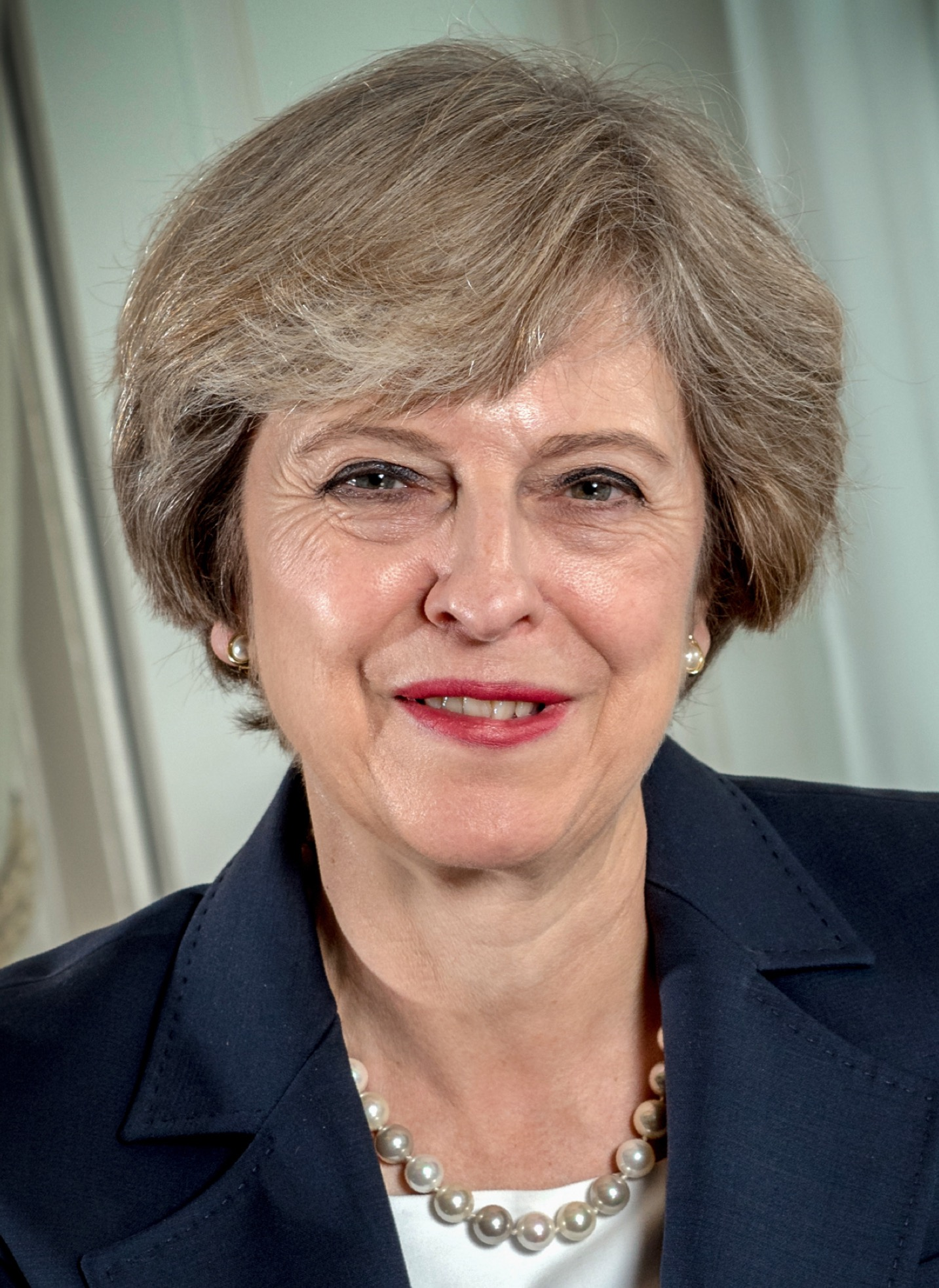

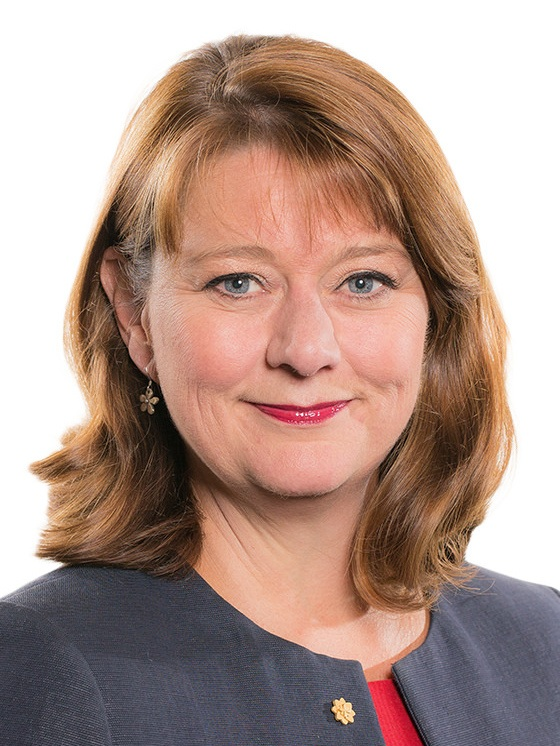

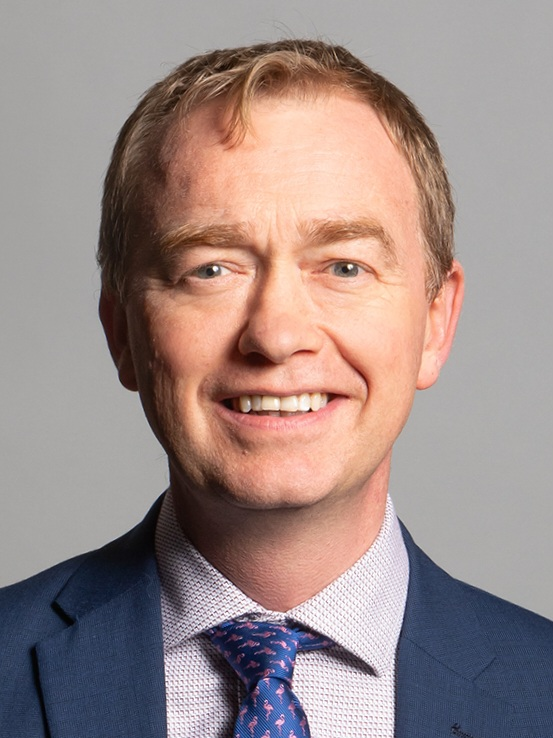
	First party	Second party
Leader	Jeremy Corbyn	Theresa May
Party	Labour	Conservative
Leader since	12 September 2015	11 July 2016
Leader's seat	Islington North	Maidenhead
Last election	25 seats, 36.9%	11 seats, 27.2%
Seats won	28	8
Seat change	▲3	▼3
Popular vote	771,354	528,839
Percentage	48.9%	33.6%
Swing	▲12.1 pp	▲6.3 pp
	Third party	Fourth party
Leader	Leanne Wood	Tim Farron
Party	Plaid Cymru	Liberal Democrats
Leader since	16 March 2012	16 July 2015
Leader's seat	Did not stand	Westmorland and Lonsdale
Last election	3 seats, 12.1%	1 seat, 6.5%
Seats won	4	0
Seat change	▲1	▼1
Popular vote	164,466	71,039
Percentage	10.4%	4.5%
Swing	▼1.7 pp	▼2.0 pp
- Results by constituency

On Thursday 8 June 2017, the 2017 United Kingdom general election was held in Wales, to elect all 650 members of the House of Commons, with 40 constituencies being in Wales. The election for each seat was conducted on the basis of first-past-the-post.

The Labour party won the most votes in Wales, with the Conservatives winning overall across the UK.

== Candidates ==
Below is a table summarising the candidates of the 2017 general election in Wales.

Affiliation	Candidates
Labour Party	40
Conservative and Unionist Party	40
Liberal Democrats	40
Plaid Cymru	40
UK Independence Party	32
Green Party of England and Wales	10
Pirate Party	3
Independent	3
Save Whithybush Save Lives	1
Official Monster Raving Loony Party	1
Women's Equality Party	1
Socialist Party of Great Britain	1
The New Society of Worth	1
Total	213

== Analysis ==
The Labour Party remained the largest party in Wales and won an even larger majority of seats after gaining three seats from the Conservatives. Its 48.9% of the vote and total of 771,354 popular votes were its best in Wales since 1997.

The Conservative Party, who entered the campaign with high hopes of making gains, saw its representation reduced back to the levels it won in the 2010 general election.

Plaid Cymru won back Ceredigion after the constituency's 12 years in Liberal Democrat hands, and brought its tally up to four seats, which was its best result showing since 2001 and one of its joint best in history.

Plaid Cymru's gain in Ceredigion and the Liberal Democrats' failure to make gains elsewhere meant that this was the first time in Welsh electoral history where there were no Liberal or Liberal Democrat MPs elected to represent a Welsh constituency in a Westminster Parliamentary election.

== Target seats ==
=== Labour ===
- Gower, Conservative, 0.1% (Labour Gain)
- Vale of Clwyd, Conservative, 0.7% (Labour Gain)
- Cardiff North, Conservative, 4.2% (Labour Gain)

=== Conservative ===
- Bridgend, Labour, 4.9% (Labour Hold)
- Wrexham, Labour, 5.6% (Labour Hold)
- Clwyd South, Labour, 6.9% (Labour Hold)
- Delyn, Labour, 7.8% (Labour Hold)
- Alyn and Deeside, Labour, 8.1% (Labour Hold)
- Newport West, Labour, 8.7% (Labour Hold)

=== Plaid Cymru ===
- Ynys Môn, Labour, 0.7% (Labour Hold)
- Ceredigion, Liberal Democrats, 8.2% (Plaid Gain)

== Results summary ==
Party	Seats					Aggregate votes		
Party	Total	Gains	Losses	Net	Of all (%)	Total	Of all (%)	Change (%)
Labour	28	3	0	▲3	70.0	771,354	48.9	▲12.1
Conservative	8	0	3	▼3	20.0	528,839	33.6	▲6.3
Plaid Cymru	4	1	0	▲1	10.0	164,466	10.4	▼1.7
Liberal Democrats	0	0	1	▼1	0.0	71,039	4.5	▼2.0
UKIP	0	0	0	Steady	—	31,376	2.0	▼11.6
Green	0	0	0	Steady	—	5,128	0.3	▼2.2
Independent	0	0	0	Steady	—	1,484	0.1	▼0.2
Save Whithybush Save Lives	0	0	0	Steady	—	1,209	0.1	▼0.1
Pirate	0	0	0	Steady	—	446	0.0	Steady
Women's Equality	0	New			—	177	0.0	New
Monster Raving Loony	0	0	0	Steady	—	157	0.0	Steady
Socialist (GB)	0	0	0	Steady	—	92	0.0	Steady
New Society of Worth	0	0	0	Steady	—	31	0.0	Steady
Total	40			0	100.0	1,575,798	100.0	0.0
Registered voters, and turnout						2,296,373	68.6	▲2.9

Popular vote
Labour	48.9%
Conservative	33.6%
Plaid Cymru	10.4%
Liberal Democrats	4.5%
UKIP	2.0%
Greens	0.3%
Other	0.2%

Parliament seats
Labour	70%
Conservative	20%
Plaid Cymru	10%

== Opinion polling ==
Date(s) conducted	Polling organisation/client	Sample size	Lab	Con	UKIP	Plaid	Lib Dem	Green	Others	Lead
8 June	General Election results	1,575,814	48.9%	33.6%	2.0%	10.4%	4.5%	0.3%	0.2%	15.3%
5–7 June 2017	YouGov/ITV	1,074	46%	34%	5%	9%	5%	1%		12%
29–31 May 2017	YouGov/ITV	1,014	46%	35%	5%	8%	5%	0%	0%	11%
18–21 May 2017	YouGov/ITV	1,025	44%	34%	5%	9%	6%	1%	1%	10%
5–7 May 2017	YouGov/ITV	1,018	35%	41%	4%	11%	7%	1%	1%	6%
4 May 2017	2017 Welsh local elections									
19–21 April 2017	YouGov/Welsh Political Barometer	1,029	30%	40%	6%	13%	8%	2%	1%	10%
18 Apr	Prime Minister Theresa May announces her intention to seek a general election to be held on 8 June 2017									
3–6 Jan 2017	YouGov/Welsh Political Barometer	1,034	33%	28%	13%	13%	9%	2%	0	5%
18–21 Sep 2016	YouGov/Welsh Political Barometer	1,001	35%	29%	14%	13%	7%	2%	0	6%
13 Jul 2016	Theresa May becomes the prime minister of the United Kingdom									
30 Jun–4 Jul 2016	YouGov/Welsh Political Barometer	1,010	34%	23%	16%	16%	8%	1%	2%	11%
5 May 2016	Welsh Assembly election and Ogmore by-election									
19–22 Apr 2016	YouGov/Welsh Political Barometer	1,001	37%	23%	17%	13%	7%	2%	1%	14%
7–11 Apr 2016	YouGov/ITV Wales	1,011	38%	22%	18%	13%	6%	2%	1%	16%
7–18 Mar 2016	Welsh Election Study	3,272	36%	25%	16%	14%	6%	—N/a	3% (Note: Including the Green Party.)	11%
9–11 Feb 2016	YouGov/Welsh Political Barometer	1,024	37%	27%	18%	13%	4%	1%	-	10%
30 Nov–4 Dec 2015	YouGov/Welsh Political Barometer	1,005	37%	27%	17%	12%	4%	2%	-	10%
21–24 Sep 2015	YouGov/Welsh Political Barometer	1,151	42%	26%	16%	10%	5%	2%	-	16%
24–26 Jun 2015	YouGov/Welsh Political Barometer	1,151	37%	28%	15%	12%	4%	3%	1%	9%
7 May 2015	General Election results	1,498,433	36.9%	27.2%	13.6%	12.1%	6.5%	2.6%	1.0%	9.7%

== See also ==
- 2017 United Kingdom general election in England
- 2017 United Kingdom general election in Scotland
- 2017 United Kingdom general election in Northern Ireland
- List of MPs for constituencies in Wales (2017–2019)
