= 2017 United Kingdom general election in Northern Ireland =

- 8 June 2017

All 18 seats in Northern Ireland to the House of Commons
- Turnout: 65.4% (▲7.3 pp)
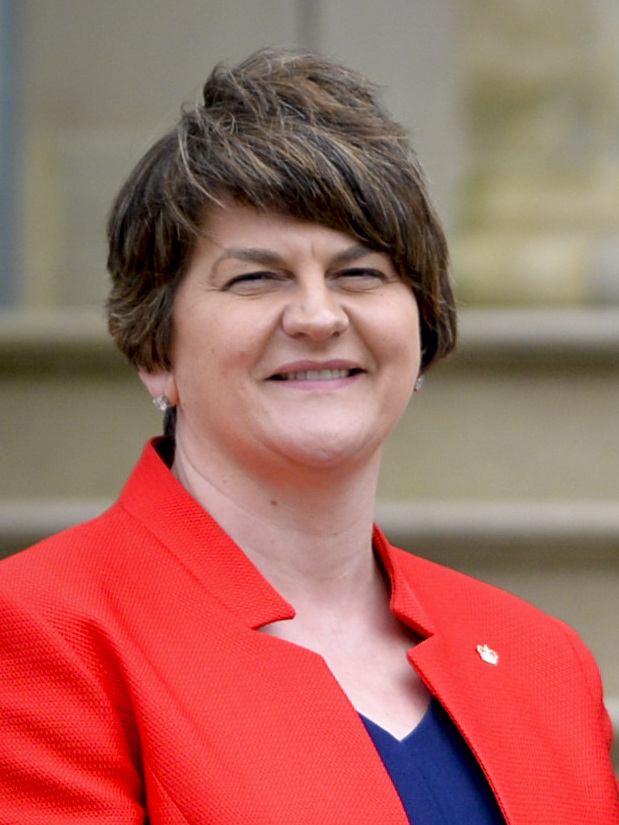

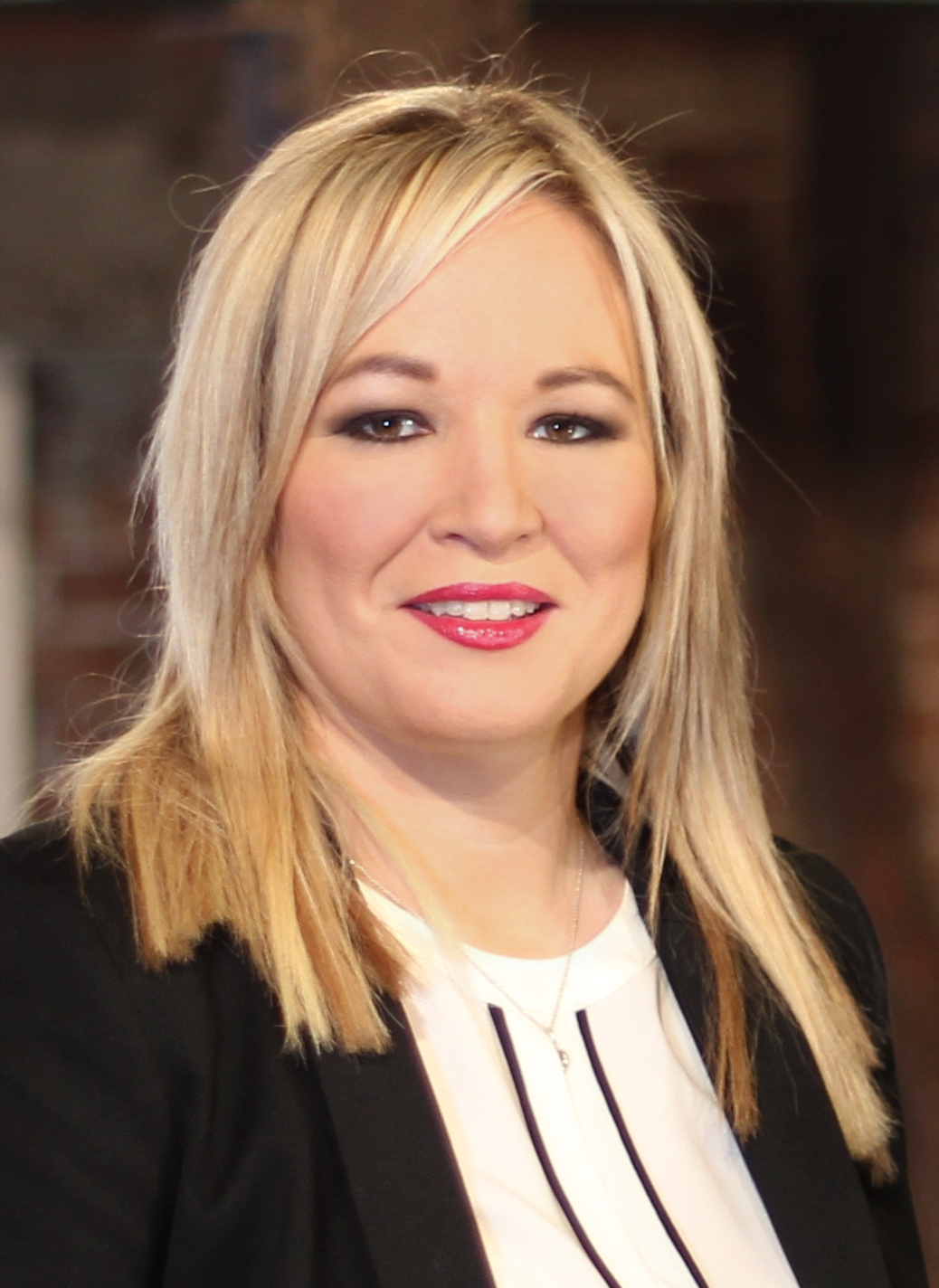

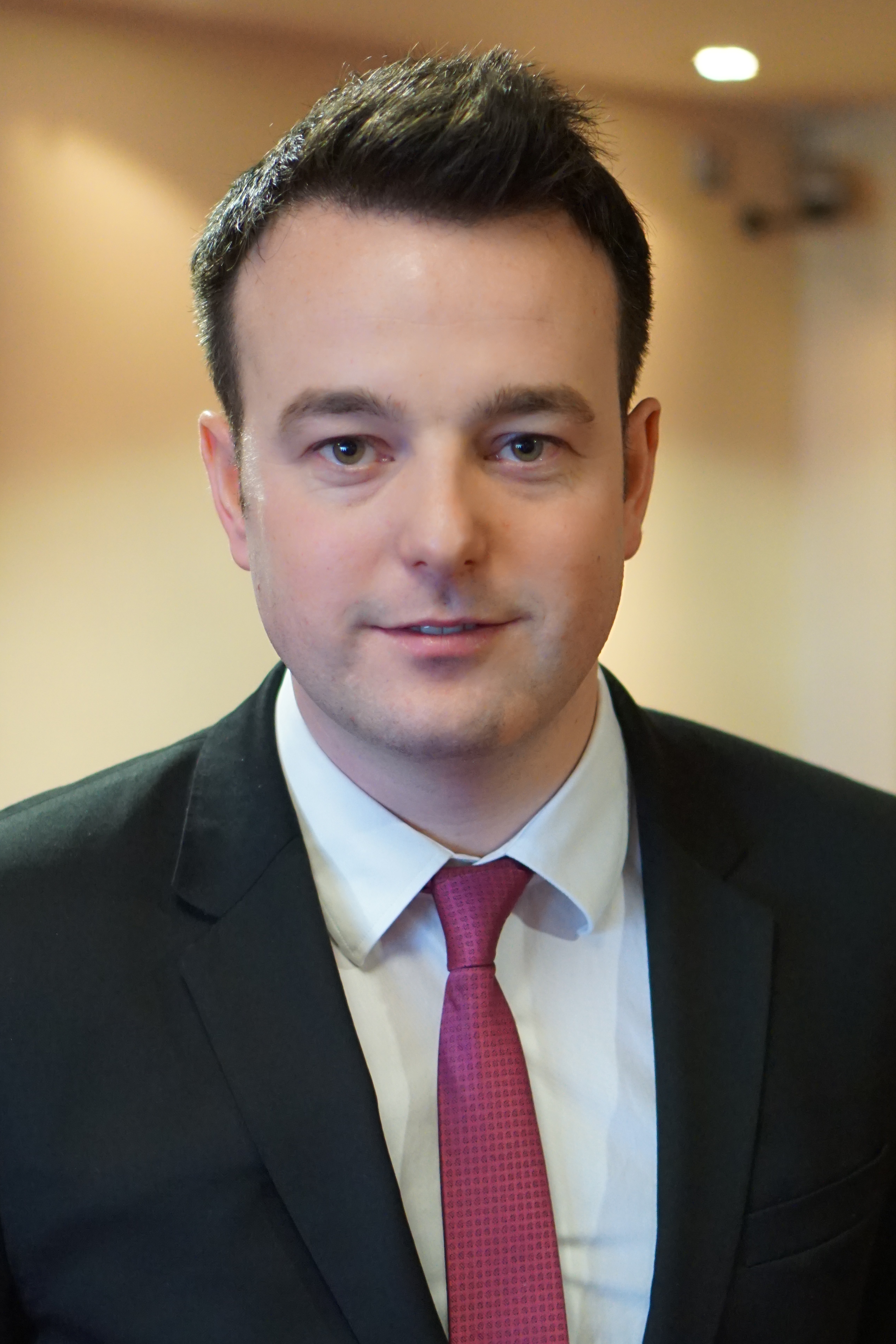

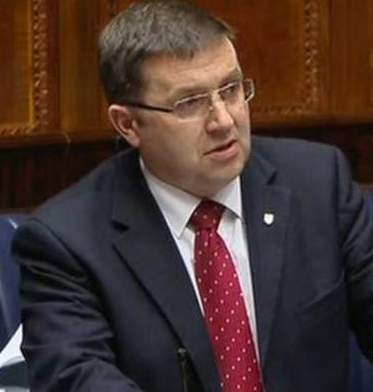

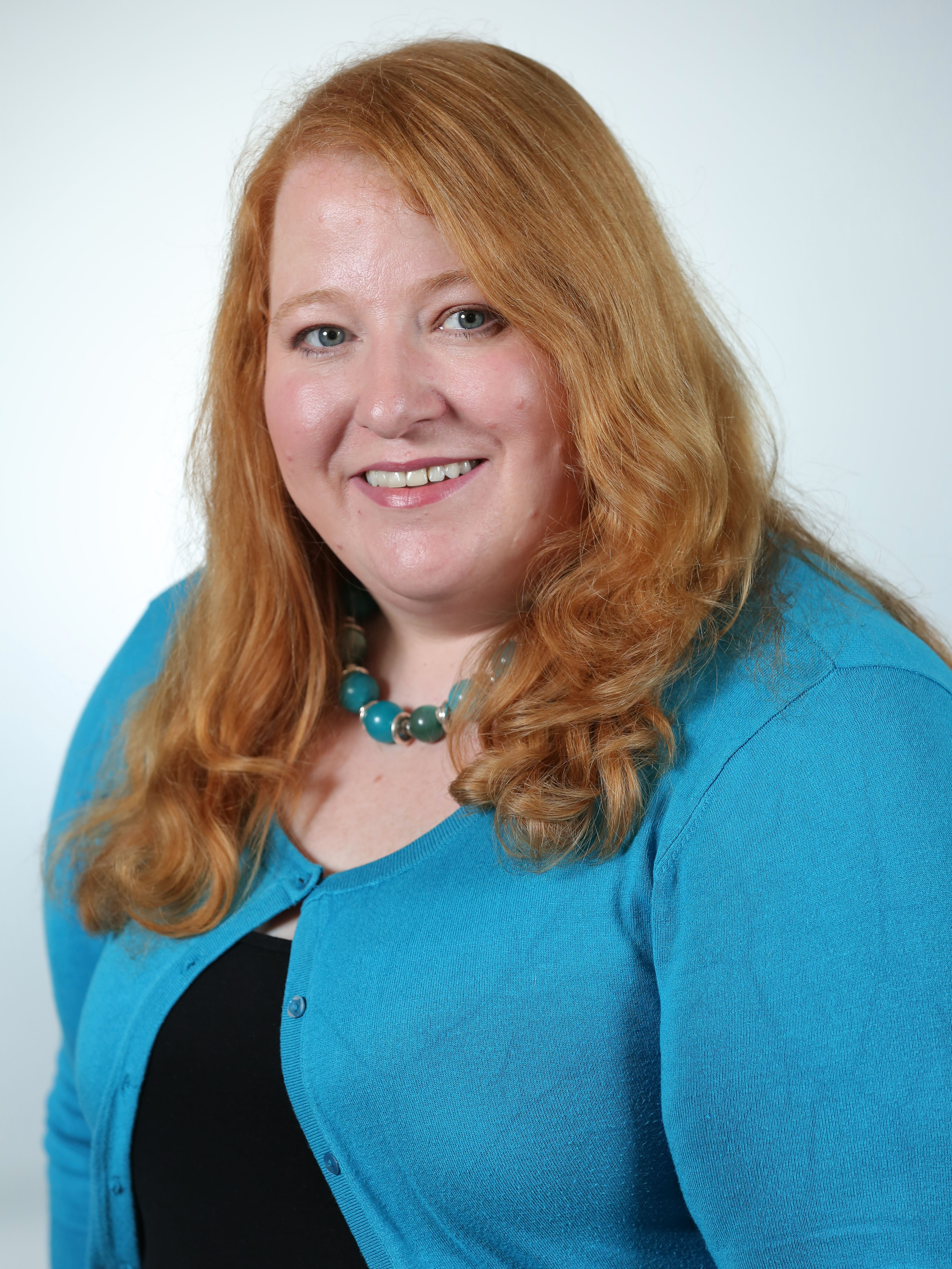
	First party	Second party	Third party
Leader	Arlene Foster	Michelle O'Neill (Note: "Party leader in the North". Gerry Adams was the party president and member of the Dáil of the Republic of Ireland.)	Colum Eastwood
Party	DUP	Sinn Féin	SDLP
Leader since	17 December 2015	23 January 2017	14 November 2015
Leader's seat	Did not stand	Did not stand	Did not stand
Last election	8 seats, 25.7%	4 seats, 24.5%	3 seats, 13.9%
Seats won	10	7	0
Seat change	▲2	▲3	▼3
Popular vote	292,316	238,915	95,419
Percentage	36.0%	29.4%	11.7%
Swing	▲10.3 pp	▲4.9 pp	▼2.2 pp
	Fourth party	Fifth party
Leader	Robin Swann	Naomi Long
Party	UUP	Alliance
Leader since	8 April 2017	26 October 2016
Leader's seat	Did not stand	Ran in Belfast East (lost)
Last election	2 seats, 16.0%	0 seats, 8.6%
Seats won	0	0
Seat change	▼2	Steady
Popular vote	83,280	64,553
Percentage	10.3%	7.9%
Swing	▼5.8 pp	▼0.6 pp
- Colours on map indicate winning party for each constituency

The 2017 United Kingdom general election in Northern Ireland was held on 8 June 2017. All 18 seats in Northern Ireland were contested. 1,242,698 people were eligible to vote, up 5,933 from the 2015 general election. 65.6% of eligible voters turned out, an increase of 7.2 percentage points from the last general election.

The DUP gained 2 seats for a total of 10, and Sinn Féin won 7, an improvement of 3. Independent unionist Sylvia Hermon was also re-elected in her constituency of North Down. Meanwhile, the SDLP lost 3 seats and the UUP lost 2 seats, meaning they both lost all their representation in the House of Commons.

As Sinn Féin maintains a policy of abstentionism in regards to the British Parliament, the 2017 election marked the first parliament since 1964 without any Irish nationalist MPs who take their seats in the House of Commons in Westminster.

Nationally, the governing Conservative Party fell 8 seats short of a parliamentary majority after the election, reduced to 4 if the absence of Sinn Féin is taken into account. The DUP thus held the balance of power, and announced on 10 June that it would support the Conservative government on a "confidence and supply" basis.

== Results ==
Five seats changed hands in Northern Ireland. The SDLP lost its seats in Foyle and South Down to Sinn Féin and the constituency of Belfast South to the DUP. Meanwhile, the UUP lost South Antrim to the DUP and Fermanagh and South Tyrone to Sinn Féin. The number of unionist and nationalist representatives (11 and 7, respectively) remained unchanged from the 2015 general election, although none of the nationalist members participated in the Parliament.

Party	Seats					Aggregate Votes		
Party	Total	Gains	Losses	Net	Of all (%)	Total	Of all (%)	Difference
DUP	10	2	0	▲2	55.6	292,316	36.0	▲10.3
Sinn Féin	7	3	0	▲3	38.9	238,915	29.4	▲4.9
SDLP	0	0	3	▼3	0.0	95,419	11.7	▼2.2
UUP	0	0	2	▼2	0.0	83,280	10.3	▼5.8
Alliance	0	0	0	Steady	0.0	64,553	7.9	▼0.6
Independent	1	0	0	Steady	5.6	16,148	2.0	▼0.7
Green (NI)	0	0	0	Steady	0.0	7,452	0.9	▼0.1
People Before Profit	0	0	0	Steady	0.0	5,509	0.7	▼0.2
NI Conservatives	0	0	0	Steady	0.0	3,895	0.5	▼0.8
TUV	0	0	0	Steady	0.0	3,282	0.4	▼1.9
Others	0	0	0	Steady	0.0	1,101	0.1	Steady
Total	18					812,183	65.4	▲7.3

== Vote and seat summary ==
Popular vote
DUP	36.0%
Sinn Féin	29.4%
SDLP	11.7%
UUP	10.3%
Alliance	7.9%
Greens	0.9%
PBP	0.7%
NI Cons	0.5%
TUV	0.4%
Other	2.1%

Parliamentary seats
DUP	55.6%
Sinn Féin	38.9%
Independent	5.6%

== See also ==
- 2017 United Kingdom general election in England
- 2017 United Kingdom general election in Scotland
- 2017 United Kingdom general election in Wales
