= Southampton Independents =

Registered political party in Great Britain

The Southampton Independents was a minor political party of the United Kingdom based in the city of Southampton, Hampshire. The party campaigned on a wide range of local issues such as tower block fire safety after the Grenfell Tower tragedy, the failed Solent Devolution Deal and Elected Mayor, housing development and re-generation, the misuse of City Council finances and corruption including the tens of millions of pounds of public money spent on the Council's Arts Complex.

It had one seat on the local council of Southampton City Council, held by Andrew Pope. Pope also contested the Southampton Test constituency in the 2017 general election, finishing fourth of five candidates with 816 votes or 1.7%. Two Southampton Independents candidates stood in the 2018 Southampton City Council election, with party leader Denise Wyatt narrowly losing the safe Labour Council seat of Redbridge by less than 200 votes. The party's Millbrook ward candidacy was designed to defeat the Labour Chair of the City Council's Planning and Rights of Way Panel, and former Agent for Basingstoke Conservative MP Maria Miller, Mike Denness. Denness lost his Millbrook seat to the Conservative candidate, Steve Galton, by 63 votes - less than the number of votes received by the Southampton Independents candidate - 91.

The party was voluntarily de-registered in 2019.
