= Parliamentary constituencies in Hampshire =

The ceremonial county of Hampshire, which includes the unitary authorities of Portsmouth and Southampton, is divided into 19 parliamentary constituencies: 9 borough constituencies and 10 county constituencies. One of the county constituencies, Farnham and Bordon is split between Hampshire and Surrey.

== Constituencies ==
Conservative † Labour ‡ Liberal Democrat ¤

Constituency (Note: BC denotes borough constituency, CC denotes county constituency.)	Electorate	Majority (Note: The majority is the number of votes the winning candidate receives more than their nearest rival.)	Member of Parliament	Nearest opposition	Map
Aldershot BC	78,553	5,683	Alex Baker ‡	Leo Docherty †	
Basingstoke BC	78,487	6,484	Luke Murphy ‡	Maria Miller †	
East Hampshire CC	70,659	1,275	Damian Hinds †	Dominic Martin ¤	
Eastleigh BC	69,965	1,546	Liz Jarvis ¤	Samuel Joynson †	
Fareham and Waterlooville CC	76,947	6,079	Suella Braverman (Reform) (Note: Braverman was elected as a Conservative but defected to Reform UK in January 2026.)	Matthew Randall ‡	
Farnham and Bordon CC (Part)	75,920	1,349	Greg Stafford †	Khalil Yousuf ¤	
Gosport BC	73,261	6,066	Caroline Dinenage †	Edward Batterbury ‡	
Hamble Valley CC	76,902	4,802	Paul Holmes †	Prad Bains ¤	
Havant BC	72,323	92	Alan Mak †	Stefanie Harvey ‡	
New Forest East CC	70,618	8,495	Julian Lewis †	Sasjkia Otto ‡	
New Forest West CC	68,644	5,600	Desmond Swayne †	Sally Johnston ‡	
North East Hampshire CC	76,923	634	Alex Brewer ¤	Ranil Jayawardena †	
North West Hampshire CC	78,629	3,288	Kit Malthouse †	Andy Fitchet ‡	
Portsmouth North BC	70,446	780	Amanda Martin ‡	Penny Mordaunt †	
Portsmouth South BC	73,711	13,155	Stephen Morgan ‡	Mark Zimmer (Reform)	
Romsey and Southampton North CC	71,871	2,191	Caroline Nokes †	Geoff Cooper ¤	
Southampton Itchen BC	68,379	6,105	Darren Paffey ‡	Sidney Yankson †	
Southampton Test BC	65,520	9,333	Satvir Kaur ‡	Ben Burcombe-Filer †	
Winchester CC	78,289	13,821	Danny Chambers ¤	Flick Drummond †	

== Boundary changes ==
=== 2024 ===
Former name
1. Aldershot BC
2. Basingstoke BC
3. East Hampshire CC
4. Eastleigh BC
5. Fareham CC
6. Gosport BC
7. Havant BC
8. Meon Valley CC
9. New Forest East CC
10. New Forest West CC
11. North East Hampshire CC
12. North West Hampshire CC
13. Portsmouth North BC
14. Portsmouth South BC
15. Romsey and Southampton North CC
16. Southampton Itchen BC
17. Southampton Test BC
18. Winchester CC
Boundaries 2010–2024

Constituencies in Hampshire (2010–2024)

Current name
1. Aldershot BC
2. Basingstoke BC
3. East Hampshire CC
4. Eastleigh BC
5. Fareham and Waterlooville CC
6. Farnham and Bordon CC
7. Gosport BC
8. Hamble Valley BC
9. Havant CC
10. New Forest East CC
11. New Forest West CC
12. North East Hampshire CC
13. North West Hampshire CC
14. Portsmouth North BC
15. Portsmouth South BC
16. Romsey and Southampton North CC
17. Southampton Itchen BC
18. Southampton Test BC
19. Winchester CC
Boundaries 2024–present

Constituencies in Hampshire (2024–present)

See 2023 review of Westminster constituencies for further details.

For the 2023 review of Westminster constituencies, which redrew the constituency map ahead of the 2024 United Kingdom general election, the Boundary Commission for England opted to combine Hampshire with Berkshire and Surrey as a sub-region of the South East Region. As a result, parts of the constituency of East Hampshire were transferred into a new cross-county (and ‘majority-Surrey’) constituency with Surrey named Farnham and Bordon.

In addition, Fareham and Meon Valley were abolished and replaced by the constituencies of Fareham and Waterlooville, and Hamble Valley.

The boroughs and districts and unitary authorities constituting the ceremonial county of Hampshire contributed to the new set of Hampshire constituencies as follows:

Containing electoral wards from Basingstoke and Deane

- Basingstoke
- East Hampshire (part)
- North East Hampshire (part)
- North West Hampshire (part)

Containing electoral wards from East Hampshire

- East Hampshire (part)
- Farnham and Bordon (also includes part in the Surrey borough of Waverley)

Containing electoral wards from Eastleigh

- Eastleigh (part)
- Hamble Valley (part)

Containing electoral wards from Fareham

- Fareham and Waterlooville (part)
- Gosport (part)
- Hamble Valley (part)

Containing electoral wards from Gosport

- Gosport (part)

Containing electoral wards from Hart

- Aldershot (part)
- North East Hampshire (part)

Containing electoral wards from Havant

- Fareham and Waterlooville (part)
- Havant

Containing electoral wards from New Forest

- New Forest East
- New Forest West

Containing electoral wards from Portsmouth

- Portsmouth North
- Portsmouth South

Containing electoral wards from Rushmoor

- Aldershot (part)

Containing electoral wards from Southampton

- Romsey and Southampton North (part)
- Southampton Itchen
- Southampton Test

Containing electoral wards from Test Valley

- Eastleigh (part)
- North West Hampshire (part)
- Romsey and Southampton North (part)

Containing electoral wards from Winchester

- Fareham and Waterlooville (part)
- Hamble Valley (part)
- Winchester

=== 2010 ===
Under the fifth periodic review of Westminster constituencies, the Boundary Commission for England decided to increase the number of seats which covered Hampshire from 17 to 18, with the creation of Meon Valley. As a consequence of resulting boundary changes, Romsey was renamed Romsey and Southampton North. The Aldershot and Basingstoke seats, more predominantly urban than previously defined, were redesignated as borough constituencies.

1997-2010 name
1. Aldershot CC
2. Basingstoke CC
3. East Hampshire CC
4. Eastleigh BC
5. Fareham CC
6. Gosport BC
7. Havant BC
8. New Forest East CC
9. New Forest West CC
10. North East Hampshire CC
11. North West Hampshire CC
12. Portsmouth North BC
13. Portsmouth South BC
14. Romsey CC
15. Southampton Itchen BC
16. Southampton Test BC
17. Winchester CC
Boundaries 1997–2010

Parliamentary constituencies in Hampshire (1997–2010)

2010–2024 name
1. Aldershot BC
2. Basingstoke BC
3. East Hampshire CC
4. Eastleigh BC
5. Fareham CC
6. Gosport BC
7. Havant BC
8. Meon Valley CC
9. New Forest East CC
10. New Forest West CC
11. North East Hampshire CC
12. North West Hampshire CC
13. Portsmouth North BC
14. Portsmouth South BC
15. Romsey and Southampton North CC
16. Southampton Itchen BC
17. Southampton Test BC
18. Winchester CC
Boundaries 2010–2024

Proposed Revised constituencies in Hampshire (2010–present)

== Results history ==
Primary data source: House of Commons research briefing – General election results from 1918 to 2019. The Isle of Wight is excluded throughout.

=== 2024 ===
The number of votes cast for each political party that fielded candidates in constituencies comprising Hampshire (excluding the new cross-county ‘majority-Surrey’ seat of Farnham and Bordon) in the 2024 general election were as follows:

Party	Votes	%	Change from 2019	Seats	Change from 2019
Conservative	273,242	32.4%	▼24.7%	9	▼7
Labour	209,643	24.8%	▲4.7%	6	▲4
Liberal Democrats	177,830	21.1%	▲2.5%	3	▲3
Reform UK	128,853	15.3%	▲15.0%	0	0
Greens	45,751	5.4%	▲2.1	0	0
Others	8,778	1.0%	▲0.4%	0	0
Total	844,097	100.0		18	

=== 2019 ===
The number of votes cast for each political party who fielded candidates in constituencies comprising Hampshire in the 2019 general election were as follows:

Party	Votes	%	Change from 2017	Seats	Change from 2017
Conservative	536,633	57.1%	▲0.5%	16	0
Labour	188,738	20.1%	▼6.5%	2	0
Liberal Democrats	175,173	18.6%	▲6.4%	0	0
Greens	30,710	3.3%	▲1.3%	0	0
Brexit	2,585	0.3%	new	0	0
Others	6,473	0.6%	▼2.0%	0	0
Total	940,312	100.0		18	

=== Percentage votes ===
Note that before 1983 Hampshire also included the Bournemouth and Christchurch areas.

Election year	1923	1924	1929	1935	1945	1950	1951	1955	1959	1964	1966	1970	1974 (F)	1974 (O)	1979	1983	1987	1992	1997	2001	2005	2010	2015	2017	2019	2024
Conservative^{1}	50.2	63.8	46.9	68.0	49.5	54.3	58.1	60.0	60.6	50.5	47.4	52.0	46.5	45.9	56.1	55.1	55.3	54.2	41.2	41.6	42.8	49.5	52.2	56.6	57.1	32.4
Labour	22.7	27.1	27.2	27.4	37.7	38.8	40.3	38.1	34.9	34.1	33.7	29.9	26.9	29.4	26.1	14.7	14.5	18.6	28.3	27.6	23.2	14.9	16.9	26.6	20.1	24.8
Liberal Democrat^{2}	27.0	9.1	23.7	3.1	6.9	6.7	1.6	1.9	4.6	15.3	13.7	12.1	26.0	24.0	17.3	29.9	30.0	26.0	25.3	27.8	29.6	29.7	11.3	12.2	18.6	21.1
Brexit Party	–	–	–	–	–	–	–	–	–	–	–	–	–	–	–	–	–	–	–	–	–	–	–	–	0.3	15.3
Green Party	–	–	–	–	–	–	–	–	–	–	–	–	–	–	–	–	*	*	*	*	*	0.7	4.3	2.0	3.3	5.4
UKIP	–	–	–	–	–	–	–	–	–	–	–	–	–	–	–	–	–	–	*	*	*	3.9	14.7	2.0	*	*
Other	–	–	2.2	1.5	5.9	0.3	–	–	–	0.04	5.1	6.0	0.7	0.8	0.5	0.2	0.2	1.2	5.1	3.0	4.4	1.3	0.5	0.6	0.6	1.0

^{1}Including National Liberal, and one National candidate in 1945

^{2}pre-1979: Liberal Party; 1983 & 1987 – SDP–Liberal Alliance

* Included in Other

Accurate vote percentages for the 1918, 1922 and 1931 elections cannot be obtained because at least one candidate stood unopposed.

=== Seats ===
Election year	1983	1987	1992	1997	2001	2005	2010	2015	2017	2019	2024
Conservative	15	15	14	11	10	10	14	17	16	16	9
Labour	0	0	1	3	3	3	2	1	2	2	6
Liberal Democrat^{1}	0	0	0	3	4	4	2	0	0	0	3
Total	15	15	15	17	17	17	18	18	18	18	18

^{1}1983 & 1987 – SDP–Liberal Alliance

=== Maps ===
==== 1885–1910 ====
1885

1886

1892

1895

1900

1906

Jan 1910

Dec 1910

==== 1918–1945 ====
1918

1922

1923

1924

1929

1931

1935

1945

==== 1950–1979 ====
1950

1951

1955

1959

1964

1966

1970

1974 (Feb)

1974 (Oct)

1979

==== 1983–present ====
1983

1987

1992

1997

2001

2005

2010

2015

2017

2019

2024

== Historical representation by party ==
A cell marked → (with a different colour background to the preceding cell) indicates that the previous MP continued to sit under a new party name. Unlike elsewhere in this article, the Isle of Wight is included in these tables.

=== 1885 to 1918 ===
Conservative Independent Conservative Liberal Liberal Unionist National Party

Constituency	1885	1886	87	88	1892	1895	96	97	00	1900	01	04	05	1906	06	Jan 10	Dec 10	12	16	17	18
Andover	Beach										E. Faber			W. Faber							
Basingstoke	Sclater-Booth		Jeffreys												Salter					Geddes	
Christchurch	Young				Smith					Balfour				Allen		Croft				Croft	
Fareham	Fitzwygram									Lee											Davidson
New Forest	F. Compton				Douglas-Scott-Montagu								H. Compton	Hobart		Perkins					
Petersfield	Palmer	→			Wickham			Nicholson													
Portsmouth	Crossman	→			Baker					Majendie				Baker		Falle		→			
Portsmouth	Vanderbyl	Wilson			Clough				Bramsdon	Lucas				Bramsdon		Beresford			Meux		
Southampton	Giles				Chamberlayne		Evans			Chamberlayne				Philipps							
Southampton	Commerell			Evans		Simeon								Ward							
Winchester	Tottenham			Moss	Myers									G. V. Baring					Carnegie	→	
Isle of Wight	Webster								Seely			→		G. Baring		Hall					

=== 1918 to 1950 ===
Coalition Liberal (1918–22) / National Liberal (1922–23) Conservative Labour Liberal National Government National Liberal (1931–68) National Party

Constituency	1918	20	21	1922	22	23	1923	1924	1929	31	1931	32	34	1935	39	40	40	41	43	1945	45
Aldershot	Palmer															Lyttelton					
Basingstoke	Geddes	Holbrook					Fletcher	Holbrook	Wallop				Wolff	Donner							
Bournemouth	Croft		→													Lyle					Bracken
Fareham	Davidson									Inskip					White						
New Forest & Christchurch	Perkins			Ashley								Mills								Crosthwaite-Eyre	
Petersfield	Nicholson													Dorman-Smith				Jeffreys			
Portsmouth Central	Bramsdon			Privett			Bramsdon	Foster	Hall		Beaumont									Snow	
Portsmouth North	Falle												Keyes						James	Bruce	
Portsmouth South	Cayzer				Wilson	Cayzer									Lucas						
Southampton	Philipps			Perkins					Morley		Barrie					Reith	Thomas			Morley	
Southampton	Ward			Bathurst					Lewis		Craven-Ellis									Lewis	
Winchester	Hennessy										Ellis			Palmer						Jeger	
Isle of Wight	Hall			Chatfeild-Clarke			Seely	Macdonald													

=== 1950 to 1983 ===
Conservative Labour Liberal Social Democratic Speaker

Constituency	1950	1951	52	54	1955	1959	60	64	1964	65	1966	68	1970	71	Feb 74	Oct 74	77	1979	81
Aldershot	Lyttelton			Errington									Critchley						
Basingstoke	Donner				Freeth				Mitchell										
Bournemouth East & Christchurch / Bth East (1974)	Bracken		Nicolson			Cordle											Atkinson		
Bournemouth West	Gascoyne-Cecil			Eden															
Christchurch and Lymington	N/A														Adley				
Eastleigh	N/A				Price														
Gosport	N/A														Viggers				
Gosport and Fareham / Fareham (1974)	Bennett																	Lloyd	
New Forest	Crosthwaite-Eyre											McNair-Wilson							
Petersfield	Jeffreys	Legh					Quennell									Mates			
Portsmouth Langstone / Havant & Waterloo (1974)	Stevens								Lloyd										
Portsmouth South	Lucas										Pink								
Portsmouth West / Portsmouth North (1974)	Clarke										Judd							Griffiths	
Southampton Itchen	Morley				King					→				Mitchell					→
Southampton Test	King				Howard				Fletcher-Cooke		Mitchell		Hill			Gould		Hill	
Winchester	Smithers							Morgan-Giles										Browne	
Isle of Wight	Macdonald					Woodnutt									Ross				

=== 1983 to 2010 ===
Conservative Democratic Unionist Independent Conservative Labour Liberal Liberal Democrats Social Democratic

Constituency	1983	84	1987	1992	94	1997	00	2001	02	04	2005
Aldershot	Critchley					Howarth					
Basingstoke	Hunter								→	→	Miller
East Hampshire	Mates										
Eastleigh	Price			Milligan	Chidgey						Huhne
Fareham	Lloyd							Hoban			
Gosport	Viggers										
Havant	Lloyd			Willetts							
New Forest / New Forest East (1997)	McNair-Wilson					Lewis					
New Forest West						Swayne					
North East Hampshire						Arbuthnot					
North West Hampshire	Mitchell					Young					
Portsmouth North	Griffiths					Rapson					McCarthy-Fry
Portsmouth South	Pink	Hancock	Martin			Hancock					
Romsey and Waterside / Romsey (1997)	Colvin						Gidley				
Southampton Itchen	Chope			Denham							
Southampton Test	Hill					Whitehead					
Winchester	Browne			Malone		Oaten					
Isle of Wight	Ross		Field			Brand		Turner			

=== 2010 to present ===
Conservative Independent Labour Liberal Democrats Reform UK

Constituency	2010	13	2015	2017	2019	20	20	2024	26
Aldershot	Howarth			Docherty				Baker	
Basingstoke	Miller							Murphy	
East Hampshire^{1}	Hinds								
Eastleigh	Huhne	Thornton	Davies		Holmes			Jarvis	
Fareham / F & Waterlooville (2024)	Hoban		Braverman						→
Gosport	Dinenage								
Hamble Valley								Holmes	
Havant	Willetts		Mak						
Meon Valley	Hollingbery				Drummond				
New Forest East	Lewis					→	→		
New Forest West	Swayne								
North East Hampshire	Arbuthnot		Jayawardena					Brewer	
North West Hampshire	Young		Malthouse						
Portsmouth North	Mordaunt							Martin	
Portsmouth South	Hancock	→	Drummond	Morgan					
Romsey and Southampton North	Nokes								
Southampton Itchen	Denham		Smith					Paffey	
Southampton Test	Whitehead							Kaur	
Winchester	Brine							Chambers	
Isle of Wight West								Quigley	
Isle of Wight / Isle of Wight E (2024)	Turner			Seely				Robertson	

^{1}parts transferred in 2024 to the constituency of Farnham and Bordon which is partially in Surrey

== See also ==
- Parliamentary constituencies in South East England
