= Southampton Test =

Parliamentary constituency in the United Kingdom, 1950 onwards

Coordinates: 50°56′N 1°25′W

- Borough constituency for the House of Commons
- Boundaries since 2010
- Boundary of Southampton Test in South East England
- County: Hampshire
- Electorate: 69,960 (2023)
- Major settlements: Southampton

Current constituency
- Created: 1950
- Member of Parliament: Satvir Kaur (Labour)
- Seats: One
- Created from: Southampton

Southampton Test is a constituency (Note: A borough constituency (for the purposes of election expenses and type of returning officer)) represented in the House of Commons of the UK Parliament by Satvir Kaur, a member of the Labour Party, since 2024. (Note: As with all constituencies, the constituency elects one Member of Parliament (MP) by the first past the post system of election at least every five years.)

== Constituency profile ==
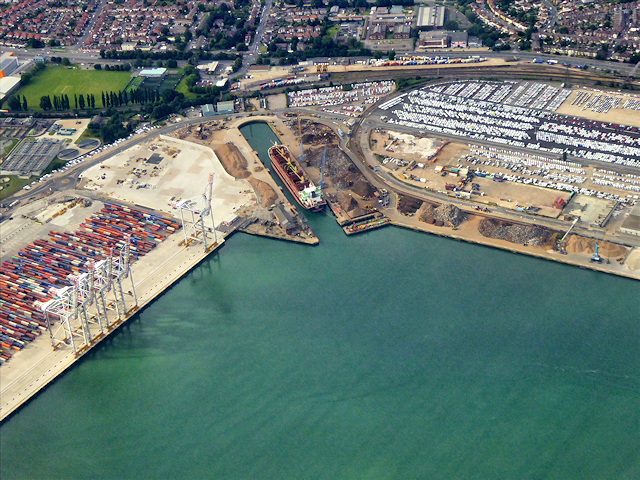
Port of Southampton

Southampton Test is a constituency in Hampshire in South East England. It covers the northern and western suburbs of the city of Southampton, including Northam, Nicholstown, Bevois Valley, Portswood, St Denys, Highfield, Shirley, Freemantle, Regents Park, Millbrook, Redbridge, Maybush, Lordshill and Lordswood. The constituency is named after the River Test which forms part of its western boundary.

Southampton is a port city on England's south coast and is a major commercial centre for freight and cruise shipping; the RMS Titanic departed from the city on its final journey. This constituency contains the Port of Southampton, the UK's second-busiest container terminal. Southampton Test contains a variety of neighbourhood types; Northam and Nicholstown are highly-deprived, inner-city areas where most residents live in dense flats or terraces, Shirley and Highfield are affluent and suburban in character, and Redbridge and Maybush contain high quantities of low-income council housing where many properties are socially rented. House prices across the constituency are generally lower than the UK average and considerably lower than the rest of South East England.

Southampton Test has a low proportion of retirees and a large student population; the University of Southampton, which has around 26,000 students, and its affiliated Southampton General Hospital are located here. Residents have average rates of income, low levels of homeownership, and above-average rates of child poverty. They have average levels of education and a high proportion work in the health, education and transport sectors. The percentage of residents claiming unemployment benefits is high. White people made up 77% of the population at the 2021 census, around one-fifth of whom were of non-British origin including a large Polish community. Asians were the largest ethnic minority group at 13%.

At the local city council, most of the constituency is represented by the Labour Party, with some Green Party councillors elected close to the university and Reform UK representatives elected in the more deprived western suburbs. An estimated 51% of voters in Southampton Test supported leaving the European Union in the 2016 referendum, similar to the UK-wide figure of 52%.

== History ==
The constituency was created for the 1950 general election, when the previous two-member Southampton constituency was abolished. The boundaries of the seat have changed at most of the Boundary Commissions' periodic reviews.

Horace King, the MP between 1950 and 1955, before switching to the neighbouring seat of Southampton Itchen, would later become the first Speaker of the House of Commons from the Labour Party. The seat was contested unsuccessfully in 1955 and 1959 respectively by Anthony Crosland and Shirley Williams, who would both later be elected for other seats and become prominent ministers in the Labour governments of the 1960s and 1970s.

Southampton Test proved to be a bellwether (mirroring the national result) from 1966 until 2010, with the exception of the minority government of Harold Wilson from February to October 1974.

In the 2010 general election, Alan Whitehead for Labour performed better here than John Denham in Southampton Itchen, the other Southampton seat, which the party also held more narrowly that year. The area from 2010 to 2015 was one of four Labour seats in South East England and from 2017 to 2019 among two of eighteen in Hampshire won by Labour candidates. Whitehead was re-elected in 2017 with a majority of over 10,000 votes, and in 2019 over 6,000, making Southampton Test a relatively comfortable Labour seat. Whitehead did not stand at the 2024 general election; he was succeeded by fellow Labour Party member, Satvir Kaur, with a majority of over 9,000.

== Boundaries ==
=== Historic ===
1950–1955: The County Borough of Southampton wards of All Saints, Banister, Freemantle, Millbrook, St Nicholas, Shirley, and Town; and the (civil) Parish of Millbrook (which was then in the Romsey and Stockbridge Rural District).

1955–1983: The County Borough of Southampton wards of Banister, Bargate, Bassett, Coxford, Freemantle, Millbrook, Portswood, Redbridge, and Shirley.

1983–1997: The City of Southampton wards of Bassett, Coxford, Freemantle, Millbrook, Portswood, Redbridge, and Shirley.

1997–2010: The City of Southampton wards of Coxford, Freemantle, Millbrook, Portswood, Redbridge, St Luke's, and Shirley.

2010–2023 The City of Southampton wards of Bevois, Coxford, Freemantle, Millbrook, Portswood, Redbridge, and Shirley.

=== Current ===
Following a review of local authority ward boundaries, which became effective in May 2023, the constituency now comprises the following:

- The City of Southampton wards of: Banister & Polygon (majority); Bevois; Coxford; Freemantle; Millbrook; Portswood; Redbridge; Shirley; Swaythling (small part).

The 2023 Periodic Review of Westminster constituencies, which was based on the ward structure in place at 1 December 2020, left the boundaries unchanged.

The constituency is bounded to the east by Southampton Itchen, to the north by Romsey and Southampton North and to the west by New Forest East.

== Members of Parliament ==
Southampton prior to 1950

Election	Member	Party
1950	Horace King	Labour
1955	John Howard	Conservative
1964	John Fletcher-Cooke	Conservative
1966	Bob Mitchell	Labour
1970	James Hill	Conservative
October 1974	Bryan Gould	Labour
1979	James Hill	Conservative
1997	Alan Whitehead	Labour
2024	Satvir Kaur	Labour

== Elections ==
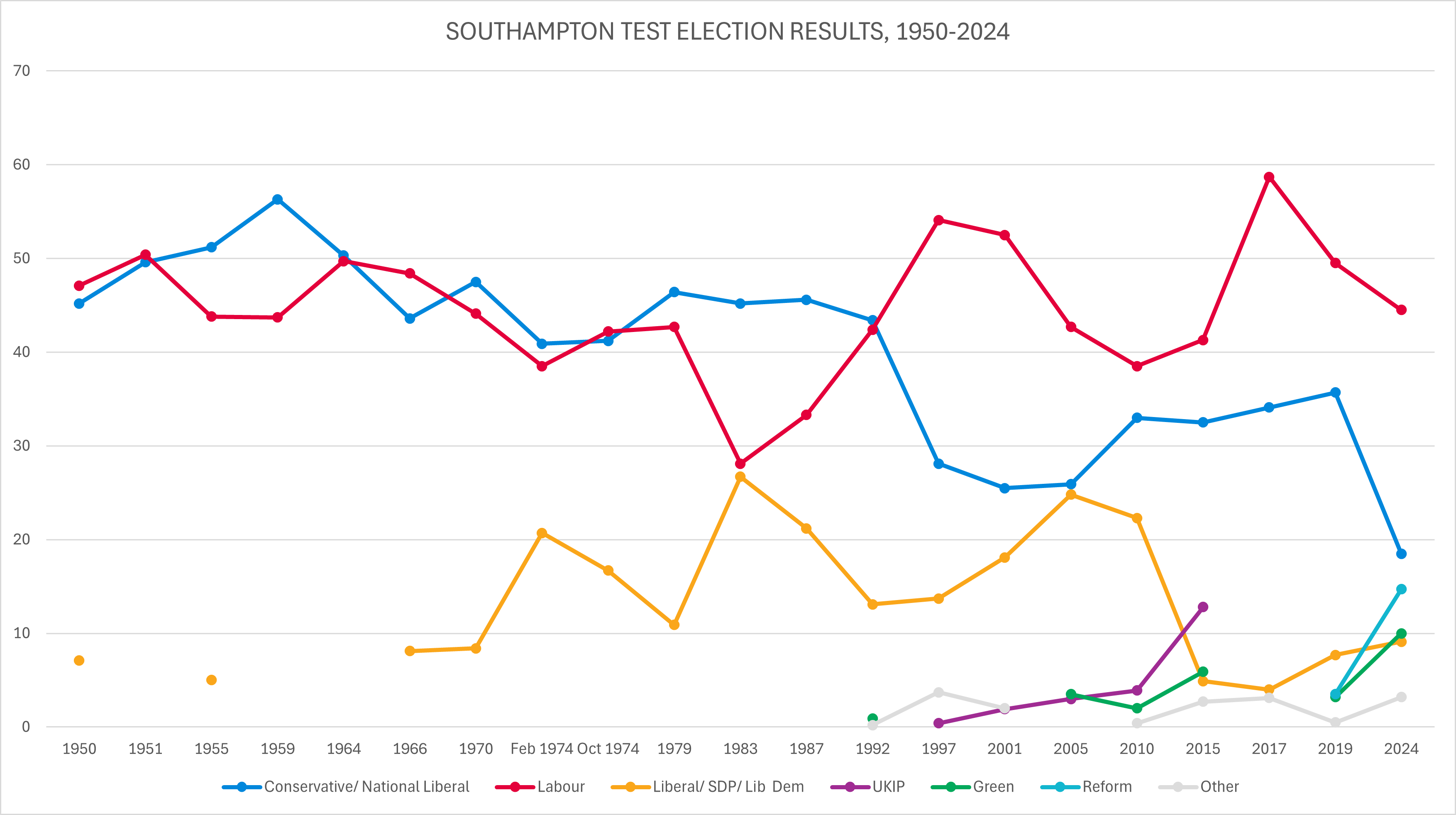
Election results 1950-2024

=== Elections in the 2020s ===
General election 2024: Southampton Test
Party	Candidate	Votes	%	±%
Labour	Satvir Kaur	15,945	44.5	−5.0
Conservative	Ben Burcombe-Filer	6,612	18.5	−17.2
Reform	John Edwards	5,261	14.7	+11.2
Green	Katherine Barbour	3,594	10.0	+6.8
Liberal Democrats	Thomas Gravatt	3,252	9.1	+1.4
Workers Party	Wajahat Shaukat	775	2.2	N/A
TUSC	Maggie Fricker	366	1.0	N/A
Majority		9,333	26.0	+12.2
Turnout		35,805	54.7	–9.6
Registered electors		65,520		
Labour hold		Swing	▲6.1	

=== Elections in the 2010s ===
General election 2019: Southampton Test
Party	Candidate	Votes	%	±%
Labour	Alan Whitehead	22,256	49.5	−9.2
Conservative	Steven Galton	16,043	35.7	+1.6
Liberal Democrats	Joe Richards	3,449	7.7	+3.7
Brexit Party	Philip Crook	1,591	3.5	N/A
Green	Katherine Barbour	1,433	3.2	N/A
Independent	Kev Barry	222	0.5	N/A
Majority		6,213	13.8	−10.8
Turnout		44,994	64.2	−2.6
Labour hold		Swing	-5.4	

General election 2017: Southampton Test
Party	Candidate	Votes	%	±%
Labour	Alan Whitehead	27,509	58.7	+17.4
Conservative	Paul Holmes	16,006	34.1	+1.6
Liberal Democrats	Thomas Gravatt	1,892	4.0	−0.9
Southampton Independents	Andrew Pope	816	1.7	N/A
Independent	Keith Morrell	680	1.4	N/A
Majority		11,508	24.6	+15.8
Turnout		46,908	66.8	+4.7
Labour hold		Swing	+7.9	

General election 2015: Southampton Test
Party	Candidate	Votes	%	±%
Labour	Alan Whitehead	18,017	41.3	+2.8
Conservative	Jeremy Moulton	14,207	32.5	−0.5
UKIP	Pearline Hingston	5,566	12.8	+8.9
Green	Angela Mawle	2,568	5.9	+3.9
Liberal Democrats	Adrian Ford	2,121	4.9	−17.4
Independent	Chris Davis	770	1.8	N/A
TUSC	Nick Chaffey	403	0.9	N/A
Majority		3,810	8.8	+3.3
Turnout		43,652	62.1	+0.7
Labour hold		Swing	+1.7	

General election 2010: Southampton Test
Party	Candidate	Votes	%	±%
Labour	Alan Whitehead	17,001	38.5	−5.7
Conservative	Jeremy Moulton	14,588	33.0	+8.0
Liberal Democrats	Dave Callaghan	9,865	22.3	−1.8
UKIP	Pearline Hingston	1,726	3.9	+0.9
Green	Chris Bluemel	881	2.0	−1.6
Majority		2,413	5.5	−11.3
Turnout		44,187	61.4	+5.4
Labour hold		Swing	−6.9	

=== Elections in the 2000s ===
General election 2005: Southampton Test
Party	Candidate	Votes	%	±%
Labour	Alan Whitehead	17,845	42.7	−9.8
Conservative	Stephen MacLoughlin	10,827	25.9	+0.4
Liberal Democrats	Steve Sollitt	10,368	24.8	+6.7
Green	John Spottiswoode	1,482	3.5	N/A
UKIP	Peter Day	1,261	3.0	+1.1
Majority		7,018	16.8	−10.2
Turnout		41,783	53.7	−2.6
Labour hold		Swing	−5.1	

General election 2001: Southampton Test
Party	Candidate	Votes	%	±%
Labour	Alan Whitehead	21,824	52.5	−1.6
Conservative	Richard Gueterbock	10,617	25.5	−2.6
Liberal Democrats	John Shaw	7,522	18.1	+4.4
UKIP	Garry Rankin-Moore	792	1.9	+1.5
Socialist Alliance	Mark Abel	442	1.1	N/A
Socialist Labour	Paramjit Bahia	378	0.9	N/A
Majority		11,207	27.0	+1.0
Turnout		41,575	56.3	−15.6
Labour hold		Swing		

=== Elections in the 1990s ===
General election 1997: Southampton Test
Party	Candidate	Votes	%	±%
Labour	Alan Whitehead	28,396	54.1	+11.7
Conservative	James Hill	14,712	28.1	−15.3
Liberal Democrats	Alan Dowden	7,171	13.7	+0.6
Referendum	Peter Day	1,397	2.7	N/A
Legalise Cannabis	Howard Marks	388	0.7	N/A
UKIP	Anthony McCabe	219	0.4	N/A
Independent	Paul Taylor	81	0.2	N/A
Natural Law	John Sinel	77	0.1	N/A
Majority		13,684	26.0	N/A
Turnout		52,441	71.9	−5.5
Labour gain from Conservative		Swing	+13.5	

General election 1992: Southampton Test
Party	Candidate	Votes	%	±%
Conservative	James Hill	24,504	43.4	−2.2
Labour	Alan Whitehead	23,919	42.4	+9.1
Liberal Democrats	Diana Maddock	7,391	13.1	−8.1
Green	Jonathan M. Michaelis	535	0.9	N/A
Natural Law	David Plummer	101	0.2	N/A
Majority		585	1.0	−11.3
Turnout		56,450	77.4	+1.0
Conservative hold		Swing	−5.6	

=== Elections in the 1980s ===
General election 1987: Southampton Test
Party	Candidate	Votes	%	±%
Conservative	James Hill	25,722	45.6	+0.4
Labour	Alan Whitehead	18,768	33.3	+5.2
Liberal	Vivienne Rayner	11,950	21.2	−5.5
Majority		6,954	12.3	−4.8
Turnout		56,440	76.4	+3.3
Conservative hold		Swing	-2.4	

General election 1983: Southampton Test
Party	Candidate	Votes	%	±%
Conservative	James Hill	24,657	45.2	
Labour	Alan Whitehead	15,311	28.1	
SDP	Adrian Vinson	14,592	26.7	
Majority		9,346	17.1	
Turnout		54,560	73.1	−3.2
Conservative hold		Swing		

=== Elections in the 1970s ===
General election 1979: Southampton Test
Party	Candidate	Votes	%	±%
Conservative	James Hill	27,198	46.36	
Labour	Bryan Gould	25,075	42.74	
Liberal	D. Hughes	6,393	10.90	
Majority		2,123	3.62	N/A
Turnout		58,666	76.30	
Conservative gain from Labour		Swing		

General election October 1974: Southampton Test
Party	Candidate	Votes	%	±%
Labour	Bryan Gould	22,780	42.17	
Conservative	James Hill	22,250	41.19	
Liberal	J.R. Wallis	8,994	16.65	
Majority		530	0.98	N/A
Turnout		54,024	73.11	
Labour gain from Conservative		Swing		

General election February 1974: Southampton Test
Party	Candidate	Votes	%	±%
Conservative	James Hill	23,742	40.88	
Labour	Bryan Gould	22,339	38.46	
Liberal	J.R. Wallis	12,000	20.66	
Majority		1,403	2.42	
Turnout		58,081	79.21	
Conservative hold		Swing		

General election 1970: Southampton Test
Party	Candidate	Votes	%	±%
Conservative	James Hill	24,660	47.54	
Labour	Bob Mitchell	22,858	44.07	
Liberal	Jack Wallis	4,349	8.38	
Majority		1,802	3.47	N/A
Turnout		51,867	73.33	
Conservative gain from Labour		Swing		

=== Elections in the 1960s ===
General election 1966: Southampton Test
Party	Candidate	Votes	%	±%
Labour	Bob Mitchell	24,628	48.37	
Conservative	John Fletcher-Cooke	22,188	43.58	
Liberal	Graham Cleverley	4,102	8.06	N/A
Majority		2,440	4.79	N/A
Turnout		51,918	78.13	
Labour gain from Conservative		Swing		

General election 1964: Southampton Test
Party	Candidate	Votes	%	±%
Conservative	John Fletcher-Cooke	25,700	50.34	
Labour	Bob Mitchell	25,352	49.66	
Majority		348	0.68	
Turnout		51,052	76.69	
Conservative hold		Swing		

=== Elections in the 1950s ===
General election 1959: Southampton Test
Party	Candidate	Votes	%	±%
Conservative	John Howard	30,176	56.31	
Labour	Shirley Williams	23,410	43.69	
Majority		6,766	12.62	
Turnout		53,586	79.88	
Conservative hold		Swing		

General election 1955: Southampton Test
Party	Candidate	Votes	%	±%
Conservative	John Howard	26,707	51.21	
Labour	Anthony Crosland	22,865	43.84	
Liberal	Stanley Little	2,583	4.95	N/A
Majority		3,842	7.37	N/A
Turnout		52,155	78.72	
Conservative gain from Labour		Swing		

General election 1951: Southampton Test
Party	Candidate	Votes	%	±%
Labour	Horace King	26,430	50.44	
National Liberal	John Paul	25,965	49.56	
Majority		465	0.88	
Turnout		52,395	83.52	
Labour hold		Swing		

General election 1950: Southampton Test
Party	Candidate	Votes	%	±%
Labour	Horace King	25,052	47.08	
National Liberal	P. Brembridge	23,663	45.15	
Liberal	Stephen Fry	3,697	7.05	
Majority		1,389	1.93	
Turnout		52,412	84.39	
Labour win (new seat)				

== See also ==
- List of parliamentary constituencies in Hampshire
- List of parliamentary constituencies in the South East England (region)
