= Lordswood =

Lordswood is the name for a number of places in the United Kingdom.

- Lordswood, Devon
- Lordswood, Kent
- Lordswood, Southampton
