= Lordshill =

Area of Southampton, England

Coordinates: 50.9489°N 1.4500°W

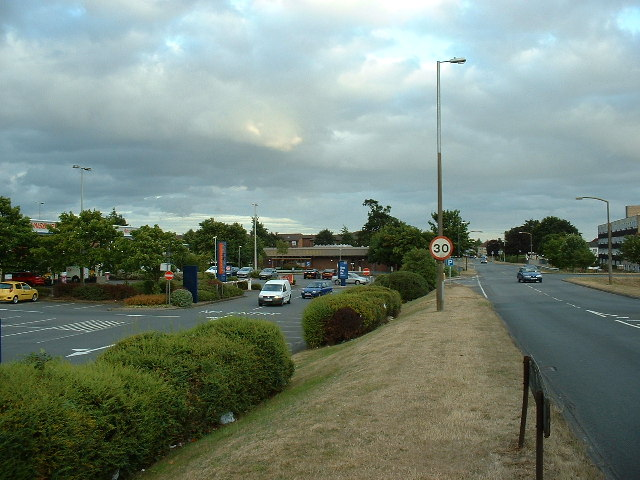
- Lordshill Centre

- Location within Southampton
- Unitary authority: Southampton
- Ceremonial county: Hampshire
- Region: South East
- Country: England
- Sovereign state: United Kingdom
- Post town: SOUTHAMPTON
- Postcode district: SO16
- Dialling code: 023
- Police: Hampshire and Isle of Wight
- Fire: Hampshire and Isle of Wight
- Ambulance: South Central
- UK Parliament: Southampton Test

Lordshill is a neighbourhood in Southampton, England. It is situated in the northern part of the city in the Coxford electoral ward. The area is mostly residential housing with over 4000 mixed council and private dwellings for a population of around 12,500.

== History ==
According to the Anglo-Saxon Charter of 956, Aldermoor, Lordswood, Lordshill and Coxford were all within the ancient boundary of the Manor of Millbrook. These were primarily farmland until the 20th century. Lordshill had one dead-end road to Tanner's Brook, between the Bedwell Arms Public House and Aldermoor Road, which was known to be steep with water frequently running down it from various springs. It got the nickname "Soapsuds Alley" because the washerwomen living there would normally throw their soapy water on to the road and the soapy water and the natural springs would mix causing a foaming torrent.

In 1964, Hampshire County Council bought 563 acres (2.28 km^{2}) of land for development to cater for a population of 2,000. By 1967, Lordshill had been incorporated within Southampton city boundaries, and in 1969 development was in full swing building the new housing estates.

In 1982, Manston Court, a retirement home of 60 self-contained flats was built.

In 2006, Sinclair Junior School closed its doors, to be replaced by a housing association development called Berwick Close.

During late 2013 and early 2014, Oaklands Community School was demolished to make way for new housing, leaving only the swimming pool and the small community room in place.

== Amenities ==
The local community areas have a mix of different shops as well as a community centre, library, church, swimming pool, and a healthcare centre. The main shopping area is called Lordshill District Centre. The library is a single story building that opened in 1977. The swimming pool reopened in 2015 after a £1.7 million refurbishment by Southampton City Council.

=== Schools ===
Local education includes two primary and junior schools: Sinclair School, which is a mixed primary and junior school, and Fairisle Infant and Junior Schools. Secondary education is provided by Oasis Academy Lord's Hill.

== Transport ==
Lordshill is served by a number of frequent bus services by Bluestar, providing various links to the city centre, as well as surrounding towns and villages such as Romsey and North Baddesley.

The nearest railway station is Redbridge.

There are a large number of paths covering the Lordshill area. These appear to have been intended for cycle use, alongside the parallel pedestrian paths. Many of these have fallen into disrepair and only a few are signed as permitted cycle routes.
