= Maybush =

Neighbourhood of Southampton, England

Coordinates: 50.931°N 1.450°W

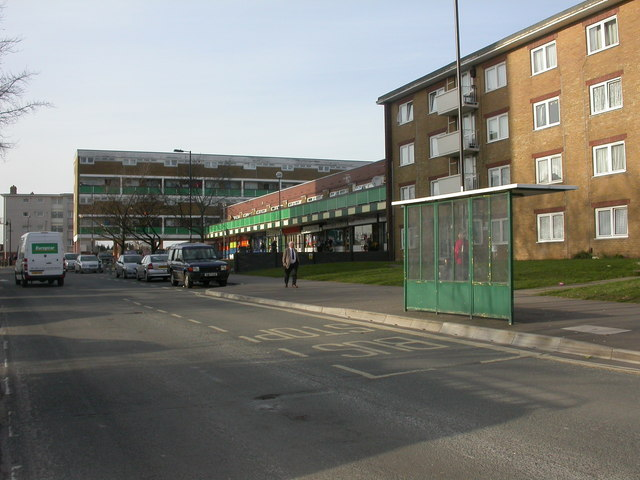
Maybush shopping parade

Maybush is a district in the city of Southampton, England. Located in the western side of the city, Maybush is the former location of the Ordnance Survey head office and approximately occupies the SU3814 kilometre square. It is in the Southampton Test parliamentary constituency.

== Notable buildings ==
- St Peters Church
