= Lordswood, Southampton =

Area of Southampton, England

Coordinates: 50.943°N 1.432°W

Lordswood
- Location within Southampton
- Unitary authority: Southampton
- Ceremonial county: Hampshire
- Region: South East
- Country: England
- Sovereign state: United Kingdom
- Post town: SOUTHAMPTON
- Postcode district: SO16
- Dialling code: 023
- Police: Hampshire and Isle of Wight
- Fire: Hampshire and Isle of Wight
- Ambulance: South Central
- UK Parliament: Southampton Test

Lordswood is a district in Hampshire, England. It is situated in the northern quarter of greater Southampton bordering the areas of Lordshill, Chilworth, Aldermoor and Bassett.

== History of Lordswood ==
According to the Anglo-Saxon Charter of 956 Aldermoor, Lordswood, Lordshill and Coxford are all within the ancient boundary of the Manor of Millbrook and were farmland within the county of Hampshire, until the 20th century when it was absorbed into Southampton.

== Landscape ==
The main feature is the gentle valley carved by Holly Brook. It is quite high ground in relation to sea level (45m) at the top of Hollybrook Cemetery.

== Housing ==
The type of housing found in Lordswood is fairly large, owner-occupied detached residences such as Bassett Avenue. There is, however, a small area of fairly new council flats in the Dunkirk Road area.

== Transport ==
The A35 Winchester Road, Southampton Ring Road is in the south-east corner. Lordswood Road is a throughroute from the northern suburbs to the West. Lord's Hill Way is a distributor road for the Lord's Hill estate, built in the 1970s.
