= Southampton Itchen =

Parliamentary constituency in the United Kingdom, 1950 onwards

Coordinates: 50°55′N 1°21′W

Southampton, Itchen
- Borough constituency for the House of Commons
- Boundaries since 1997
- Boundary of Southampton Itchen in South East England
- County: Hampshire
- Electorate: 72,150 (2023)
- Major settlements: Southampton

Current constituency
- Created: 1950
- Member of Parliament: Darren Paffey (Labour)
- Seats: One
- Created from: Southampton

Southampton, Itchen is a constituency (Note: A borough constituency (for the purposes of election expenses and type of returning officer)) represented in the House of Commons of the UK Parliament since 2024 by Darren Paffey from the Labour Party (UK). Before then, it had been held since 2015 by Royston Smith GM of the Conservative Party, who had announced his retirement from frontline politics in 2023 and did not seek re-election in 2024.

The constituency is named after the River Itchen, which flows through it and is the lesser of the two major rivers that reach the tidal estuary of Southampton Water at the city.

== Constituency profile ==
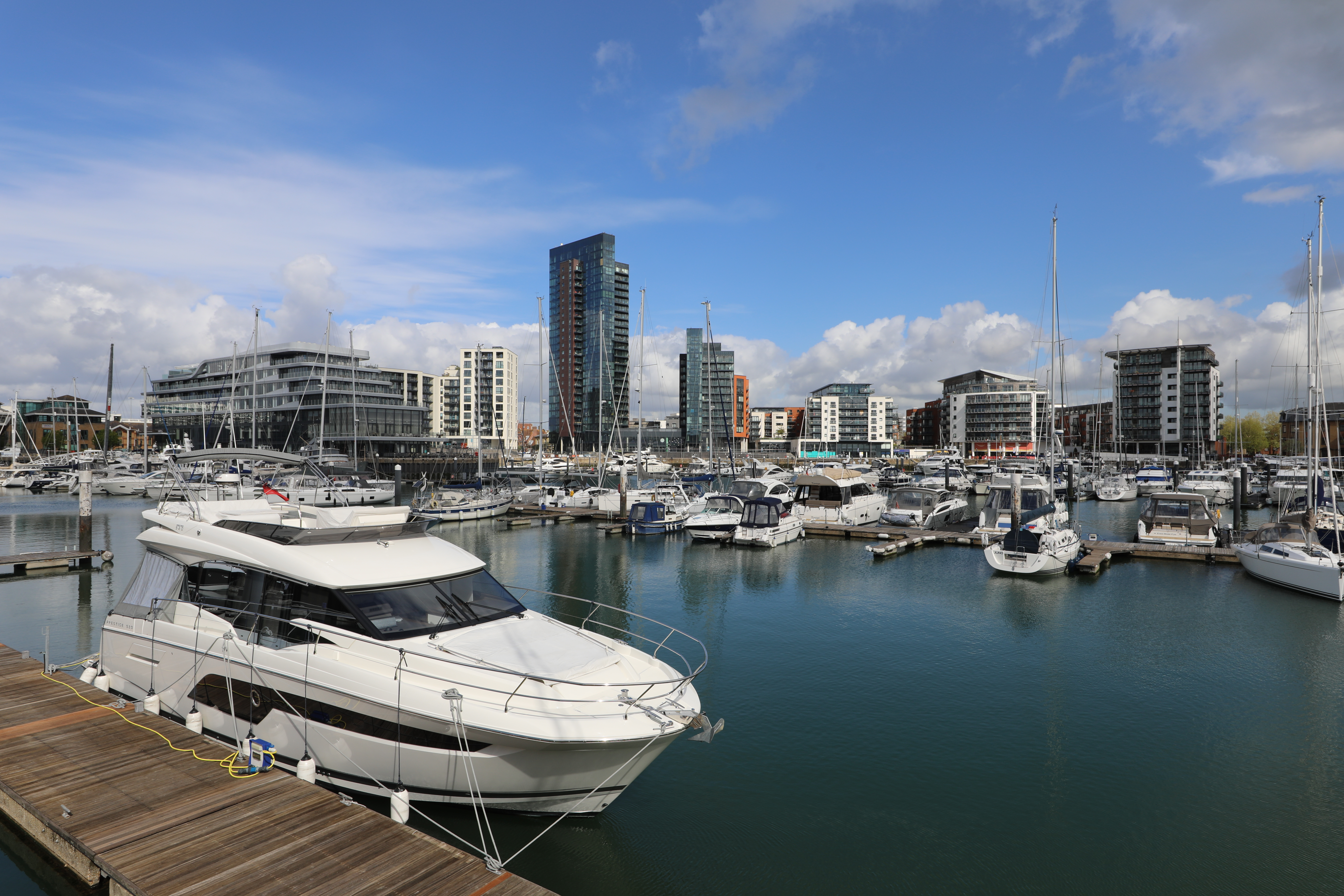
Ocean Village

Southampton Itchen is a constituency in Hampshire in South East England. It covers the city centre of Southampton, including the Polygon, and the city's eastern suburbs across the River Itchen, including Woolston, Weston, Sholing, Thornhill, Bitterne, Harefield, Midanbury and Townhill Park.

Southampton is a port city on England's south coast and is a major commercial centre for freight and cruise shipping; the RMS Titanic departed from the city on its final journey. Much of the city centre was destroyed in the Southampton Blitz of World War II and has since been redeveloped; the vast majority of residents here live in flats and have average levels of wealth. The suburbs east of the River Itchen are largely 20th-century developments with a mixture of housing types, built to house city workers. Bitterne is affluent whilst Thornhill is a council estate with high levels of deprivation. House prices across the constituency are generally lower than the UK average and considerably lower than the rest of South East England.

Southampton Itchen has a low proportion of retirees and large populations of students and young adults; Southampton Solent University is located here and has around 9,000 students. Residents have below-average rates of income and low levels of homeownership. The child poverty rate is above-average. Residents have average levels of education and a high proportion work in the retail and transport sectors. The percentage claiming unemployment benefits is in line with the overall UK rate. White people made up 86% of the population at the 2021 census.

At the local city council, the city centre is represented by Labour Party and Green Party councillors whilst the eastern suburbs elected mostly Reform UK and Conservatives. An estimated 59% of voters in Southampton Itchen supported leaving the European Union in the 2016 referendum, higher than the UK-wide figure of 52%.

== History ==
The constituency was created in 1950, when the two-member Southampton constituency was abolished.

Until 1979 it was a safe Labour seat – apart from 1965 to 1971, when Horace King became the first member of the Labour Party to serve as the Speaker of the House of Commons. A Conservative MP, Christopher Chope, was elected in 1983 and 1987 after the sitting MP Bob Mitchell left Labour in 1981 for the SDP. The combination of Mitchell as a strong SDP-Liberal Alliance candidate in both 1983 and 1987, together with Conservative landslides, made Southampton Itchen highly competitive.

Since 1987, campaigns in the seat have resulted in a minimum of 26.8% of votes at each election consistently for the same two parties' choice for candidate, and the next highest-placed share having fluctuated between 3% and 23% of the vote. In those recent elections, save for 2015 when UKIP surged nationally, the third-placed candidate has been a Liberal Democrat, whose candidate lost their deposit in the result perhaps uniquely for an English university city seat in 2017, but which takes in far fewer of the university areas than Southampton Test. The seat attracted nine candidates in 1997; three in 1992. Oldest elections in the seat were sometimes a two-candidate contest, as in comparator mid-twentieth century English elections.

Labour candidate John Denham, defeated Chope by 551 votes in 1992 and held the seat with low-to-average majorities until 2010 when he won by 192 votes. From 2010 to 2017, the three general election results in the seat presented themselves as two-party ultra-marginal (finely-balanced) contests.

Royston Smith GM gained the seat as a Conservative Party candidate in 2015. He had led his party's group on the city council and first contested the seat in 2010. He retained the seat in the 2017 general election with a majority of 31 votes, and subsequently at the 2019 general election with a majority of over 4,000 votes. Following Smith's retirement for the 2024 election, the seat was retaken for Labour by Darren Paffey on a swing of 12.8%, resulting in a majority of over 6,000.

== Boundaries ==
=== Historic ===
1950–1955: The County Borough of Southampton wards of Bevois, Bitterne and Peartree, Bitterne and Sholing, Newtown, Northam, Portswood, St Denys, St Mary's, Trinity, and Woolston.

1955–1983: The County Borough of Southampton wards of Bitterne, Harefield, Peartree and Bitterne Manor, St Denys and Bitterne Park, St Luke's, St Mary's, Sholing, Swaythling, and Woolston.

1983–1997: The City of Southampton wards of Bargate, Bitterne, Bitterne Park, Harefield, Peartree, St Luke's, and Sholing.

1997–2023: The City of Southampton wards of Bargate, Bitterne, Bitterne Park, Harefield, Peartree, Sholing, and Woolston.

=== Current ===
Following a review of local authority ward boundaries, which became effective in May 2023, the constituency now comprises the following:

- The City of Southampton wards of Bargate, Bitterne Park, Harefield, Peartree, Sholing, Thornhill, and Woolston; and two polling districts from the Banister & Polygon ward.

The 2023 review of Westminster constituencies, which was based on the ward structure in place at 1 December 2020, left the boundaries unchanged.

The constituency is bounded to the west by Southampton Test (Labour), to the north by Romsey and Southampton North (Conservative), to the north east by Eastleigh (Lib Dem) and to the south east by Hamble Valley (Conservative).

== Members of Parliament ==
Southampton prior to 1950

Election	Member	Party
1950	Ralph Morley	Labour
1955	Horace King	Labour
1965	Horace King	Speaker
1971 by-election	Bob Mitchell	Labour
1981	Bob Mitchell	SDP
1983	Christopher Chope	Conservative
1992	John Denham	Labour
2015	Royston Smith	Conservative
2024	Darren Paffey	Labour

== Elections ==
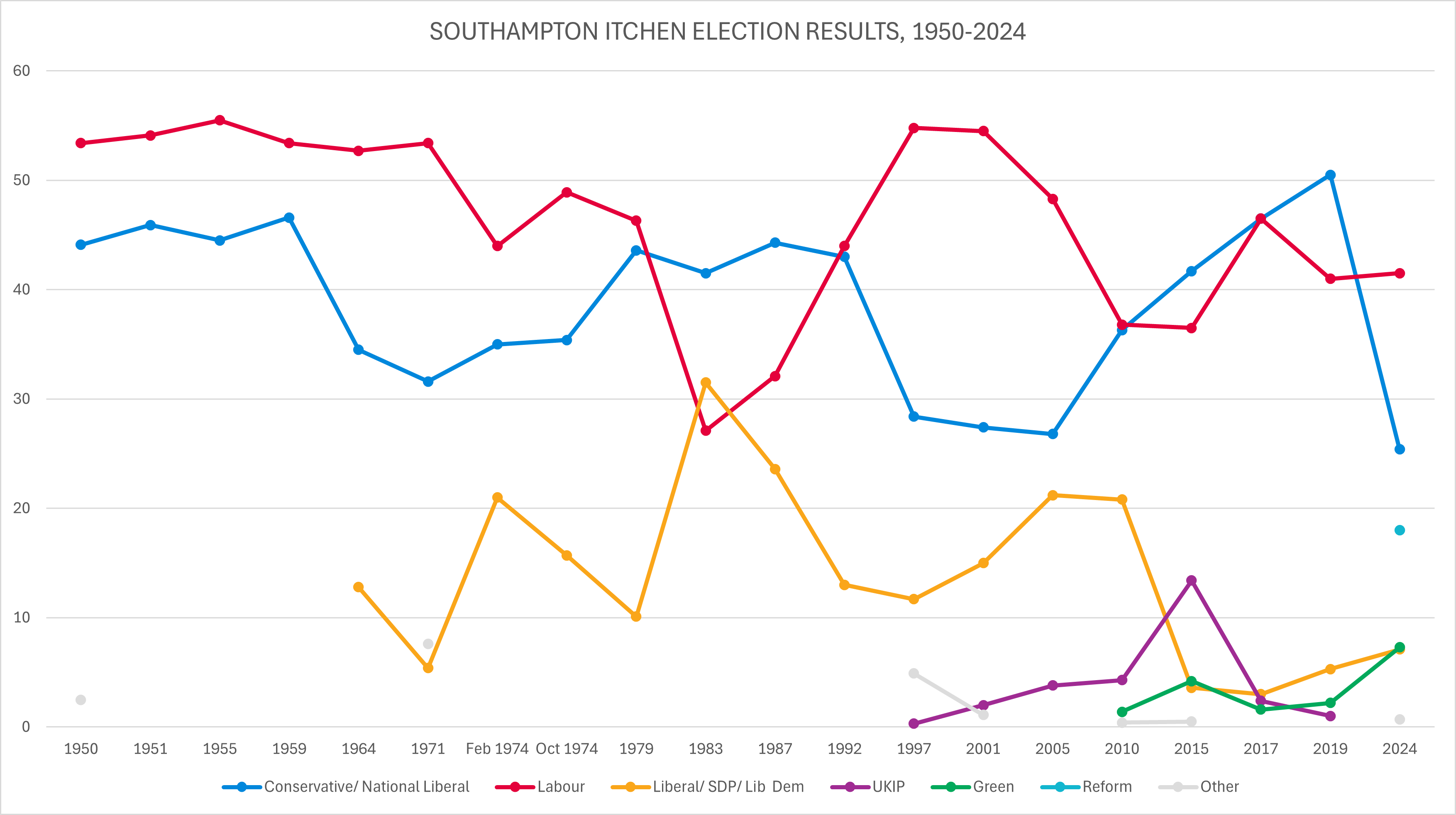
Election results 1950-2024

=== Elections in the 2020s ===
General election 2024: Southampton Itchen
Party	Candidate	Votes	%	±%
Labour	Darren Paffey	15,782	41.5	+0.5
Conservative	Sidney Yankson	9,677	25.4	–25.1
Reform	Alex Culley	6,853	18.0	N/A
Green	Neil Lyon-Kelly	2,793	7.3	+5.1
Liberal Democrats	James Batho	2,684	7.1	+1.8
TUSC	Declan Clune	264	0.7	N/A
Majority		6,105	16.1	N/A
Turnout		38,053	55.7	–10.0
Registered electors		68,379		
Labour gain from Conservative		Swing	▲12.8	

=== Elections in the 2010s ===
General election 2019: Southampton Itchen
Party	Candidate	Votes	%	±%
Conservative	Royston Smith	23,952	50.5	+4.0
Labour	Simon Letts	19,454	41.0	−5.5
Liberal Democrats	Liz Jarvis	2,503	5.3	+2.3
Green	Osman Sen-Chadun	1,040	2.2	+0.6
UKIP	Kim Rose	472	1.0	−1.4
Majority		4,498	9.5	+9.4
Turnout		47,421	65.6	+0.4
Conservative hold		Swing	+4.8	

General election 2017: Southampton Itchen
Party	Candidate	Votes	%	±%
Conservative	Royston Smith	21,773	46.54	+4.8
Labour	Simon Letts	21,742	46.47	+10.0
Liberal Democrats	Eleanor Bell	1,421	3.0	−0.6
UKIP	Kim Rose	1,122	2.4	−11.0
Green	Rosie Pearce	725	1.6	−2.6
Majority		31	0.07	−5.1
Turnout		46,783	65.2	+3.4
Conservative hold		Swing	-2.6	

General election 2015: Southampton Itchen
Party	Candidate	Votes	%	±%
Conservative	Royston Smith	18,656	41.7	+5.4
Labour	Rowenna Davis	16,340	36.5	−0.3
UKIP	Kim Rose	6,010	13.4	+9.1
Green	John Spottiswoode	1,876	4.2	+2.8
Liberal Democrats	Eleanor Bell	1,595	3.6	−17.2
TUSC	Sue Atkins	233	0.5	+0.1
Majority		2,316	5.2	N/A
Turnout		44,710	61.8	+2.2
Conservative gain from Labour		Swing	+2.8	

General election 2010: Southampton Itchen
Party	Candidate	Votes	%	±%
Labour	John Denham	16,326	36.8	−11.5
Conservative	Royston Smith	16,134	36.3	+8.5
Liberal Democrats	David Goodall	9,256	20.8	−0.3
UKIP	Alan Kebbell	1,928	4.3	+0.5
Green	John Spottiswoode	600	1.4	New
TUSC	Tim Cutter	168	0.4	New
Majority		192	0.5	−21.0
Turnout		44,412	59.6	+4.1
Labour hold		Swing	−10.3	

=== Elections in the 2000s ===
General election 2005: Southampton Itchen
Party	Candidate	Votes	%	±%
Labour	John Denham	20,871	48.3	−6.2
Conservative	Flick Drummond	11,569	26.8	−0.6
Liberal Democrats	David Goodall	9,162	21.2	+6.2
UKIP	Kim Rose	1,623	3.8	+1.8
Majority		9,302	21.5	−5.6
Turnout		43,225	55.5	+1.5
Labour hold		Swing	−2.8	

General election 2001: Southampton Itchen
Party	Candidate	Votes	%	±%
Labour	John Denham	22,553	54.5	−0.3
Conservative	Caroline Nokes	11,330	27.4	−1.0
Liberal Democrats	Mark Cooper	6,195	15.0	+3.3
UKIP	Kim Rose	829	2.0	+1.7
Socialist Alliance	Gavin Marsh	241	0.6	New
Socialist Labour	Michael Holmes	225	0.5	
Majority		11,223	27.1	+0.7
Turnout		41,373	54.0	−16.0
Labour hold		Swing	+0.4	

Electorate: 76,603

=== Elections in the 1990s ===
General election 1997: Southampton Itchen
Party	Candidate	Votes	%	±%
Labour	John Denham	29,498	54.8	+10.8
Conservative	Peter Fleet	15,269	28.4	−13.7
Liberal Democrats	David Harrison	6,289	11.7	−2.2
Referendum	John Clegg	1,660	3.1	New
Socialist Labour	Kim Rose	628	1.2	New
UKIP	Clive Hoar	172	0.3	New
Socialist	Gavin Marsh	113	0.2	New
Natural Law	Rosemary Barry	110	0.2	New
ProLife Alliance	Ferdi McDermott	99	0.2	New
Majority		14,220	26.4	+21.4
Turnout		53,838	70.0	−5.1
Labour hold		Swing	+12.3	

Electorate: 76,869

General election 1992: Southampton Itchen
Party	Candidate	Votes	%	±%
Labour	John Denham	24,402	44.0	+11.9
Conservative	Christopher Chope	23,851	43.0	−1.3
Liberal Democrats	James R.T. Hodgson	7,221	13.0	−10.6
Majority		551	1.0	N/A
Turnout		55,474	76.9	+1.0
Labour gain from Conservative		Swing	+6.6	

=== Elections in the 1980s ===
General election 1987: Southampton Itchen
Party	Candidate	Votes	%	±%
Conservative	Christopher Chope	24,419	44.3	+2.8
Labour	John Denham	17,703	32.1	+5.0
SDP	Bob Mitchell	13,006	23.6	−7.9
Majority		6,716	12.2	+2.2
Turnout		55,128	75.9	+2.6
Conservative hold		Swing	-1.1	

General election 1983: Southampton Itchen
Party	Candidate	Votes	%	±%
Conservative	Christopher Chope	21,937	41.5	
SDP	Bob Mitchell	16,647	31.5	
Labour	John Denham	14,324	27.1	
Majority		5,290	10.0	N/A
Turnout		52,908	73.3	
Conservative gain from SDP		Swing		

=== Elections in the 1970s ===
General election 1979: Southampton Itchen
Party	Candidate	Votes	%	±%
Labour	Bob Mitchell	28,036	46.3	−2.6
Conservative	Andrew Hunter	26,434	43.6	+8.2
Liberal	John Pindar	6,132	10.1	−5.6
Majority		1,602	2.7	−10.8
Turnout		60,602	74.7	+4.4
Labour hold		Swing		

General election October 1974: Southampton Itchen
Party	Candidate	Votes	%	±%
Labour	Bob Mitchell	28,168	48.9	+4.9
Conservative	P. T. James	20,373	35.4	+0.4
Liberal	Joseph Cherryson	9,071	15.7	−5.3
Majority		7,795	13.5	+4.5
Turnout		57,612	70.3	−6.9
Labour hold		Swing		

General election February 1974: Southampton Itchen
Party	Candidate	Votes	%	±%
Labour	Bob Mitchell	27,557	44.0	N/A
Conservative	P. T. James	21,967	35.0	N/A
Liberal	Joseph Cherryson	13,173	21.0	N/A
Majority		5,590	9.0	N/A
Turnout		62,697	77.2	+23.1
Labour gain from Speaker		Swing		

1971 Southampton Itchen by-election
Party	Candidate	Votes	%	±%
Labour	Bob Mitchell	22,575	55.36	New
Conservative	James Spicer	12,900	31.63	New
National Democratic	Edwin Bray	3,090	7.58	−14.32
Liberal	Joseph Cherryson	2,214	5.43	New
Majority		9,675	23.73	N/A
Turnout		40,779		
Labour gain from Speaker		Swing		

General election 1970: Southampton Itchen
Party	Candidate	Votes	%	±%
Speaker	Horace King	29,417	67.2	−18.2
National Democratic	Edwin Bray	9,581	21.9	New
Independent	Brian Henry Phillips	4,794	11.0	New
Majority		19,836	45.3	−25.5
Turnout		43,792	54.1	+5.1
Speaker hold		Swing		

=== Elections in the 1960s ===
General election 1966: Southampton Itchen
Party	Candidate	Votes	%	±%
Speaker	Horace King	30,463	85.4	+32.7
Democratic Non-party Nationalist	Kenneth Douglas Hunt	5,217	14.6	New
Majority		25,246	70.8	+52.6
Turnout		35,680	49.0	−27.1
Speaker gain from Labour		Swing		

General election 1964: Southampton Itchen
Party	Candidate	Votes	%	±%
Labour	Horace King	28,949	52.7	−0.7
Conservative	Godfrey Olson	18,974	34.5	−12.1
Liberal	Joseph Cherryson	7,007	12.8	New
Majority		9,975	18.2	+9.4
Turnout		54,930	76.1	−1.9
Labour hold		Swing		

=== Elections in the 1950s ===
General election 1959: Southampton Itchen
Party	Candidate	Votes	%	±%
Labour	Horace King	29,123	53.42	
Conservative	Evelyn King	25,390	46.58	
Majority		3,733	6.84	
Turnout		54,513	78.00	
Labour hold		Swing		

General election 1955: Southampton Itchen
Party	Candidate	Votes	%	±%
Labour	Horace King	29,149	55.49	
Conservative	Leslie Loader	23,378	44.51	
Majority		5,771	10.98	
Turnout		52,527	78.28	
Labour hold		Swing		

General election 1951: Southampton Itchen
Party	Candidate	Votes	%	±%
Labour	Ralph Morley	30,330	54.12	
National Liberal	Reginald Stranger	25,708	45.88	
Majority		4,622	8.24	
Turnout		56,038	83.59	
Labour hold		Swing		

General election 1950: Southampton Itchen
Party	Candidate	Votes	%	±%
Labour	Ralph Morley	29,749	53.44	
National Liberal	Robert Hobart	24,536	44.08	
Ind. Conservative	William Craven-Ellis	1,380	2.48	
Majority		5,213	9.36	
Turnout		55,665	84.0	
Labour win (new seat)				

== See also ==
- Parliamentary constituencies in Hampshire
- Parliamentary constituencies in South East England

== Notes ==
Parliament of the United Kingdom
Preceded by Cities of London and Westminster	Constituency represented by the speaker 1965–1971	Succeeded by Wirral
