= Harry Epworth Allen =

English painter

Harry Epworth Allen MM
- Born: 27 November 1894; 36, William Street, Sheffield, England
- Died: 25 March 1958 (aged 63); 67, Banner Cross Road, Sheffield, England
- Occupations: Clerk; Soldier; Artist
- Known for: Landscape painting

Harry Epworth Allen (27 November 1894 – 25 March 1958) was an English painter. He was one of the twentieth century's most distinctive interpreters of landscape. Allen was recognised as one of the Yorkshire Artists group but also made numerous landscape works of the west of Ireland particularly in the area around Achill.

== Early life ==
H. E. Allen was born at 36, William Street, in the Broomhall district of Sheffield, England. The city would remain his home for the rest of his life. His father was Henry Allen, a steel mark maker, and his mother, Elizabeth Epworth Allen (née Blacktin). Epworth was the maiden name of Elizabeth's mother, who was also called Elizabeth.

Allen showed remarkable artistic talent from an early age and, in 1902, won third prize for pen and ink drawing in an art studentship competition run by the Sheffield Weekly Independent. Between 1907 and 1911, he attended the King Edward VII School in Sheffield, where he obtained a Lower School Certificate Prize for his class distinctions in Arithmetic, Scripture and English.

In 1911, he began work as a clerk in the steel works owned by Arthur Balfour and in 1912 he enrolled at the Sheffield Technical School of Art.

== War service ==
In 1915, Allen enlisted with the Royal Garrison Artillery of the Regular Army and in June 1916 was posted to the British Expeditionary Force to France. He worked as an assistant to the observation officer, sketching enemy equipment and locations in the field. In August 1916, he was moved to the front line. In 1917, he was awarded the Military Medal for conspicuous gallantry. Badly wounded, one of his legs was amputated above the knee, and the other suffered serious injury. His school magazine for 1917 recorded his experience:

Private H.E.Allen (R.G.A.) has been awarded the Military Medal for conspicuous gallantry under heavy shell fire on January 25th 1917. He was an assistant to the observation officer, and had many exciting times in this post. Under heavy shelling of the enemy, he found his officer completely buried in the dug-out, and, though under heavy fire, tried to extricate him. A shell falling within a yard of him buried and bruised him, but he managed to get free and obtain further assistance and save the officer's life. Unfortunately, Allen himself was badly wounded in both legs and lies in hospital in France.

== Artistic career ==
Allen was discharged from the Army in 1918. He was involved in a number of art societies in the 1920s and was a pupil of Frank Saltfleet.

He was a member of a number of art societies including Sheffield Society of Artists, Hallamshire Sketch Club (from 1932 known as the Hallamshire Art Society), Heeley Art Club, and later the Pastel Society 1952. He exhibited at The Royal Academy over 23 years from 1933 and he had 39 works accepted by them. He was prolific as an artist, working from the 1920s up until his death in 1958.

On 16 May 1925, he married Lucy Hodder at Holy Trinity Church, Millbrook, Southampton. They took their honeymoon at Corfe in Dorset. In 1931, Allen was made redundant and became a professional painter. After the death of Allen's father in 1932, the couple went to live with his mother, Elizabeth Epworth Blacktin. Allen died on 25 March 1958, at home, at 67 Banner Cross Road, from a coronary thrombosis.

== Paintings ==
Allen was recognised as one of the Yorkshire Artists group, but also made numerous landscape works of the West of Ireland, particularly in the area around Achill. His style is often regarded as surreal.

Allen's paintings are held in the art collections of a number of British institutions including Sheffield Museums, Derby Art Gallery, The Hepworth Wakefield and the British Museum.

In April 2013, two of Allens' wartime paintings, of Achill Island in County Mayo, were shown on BBC One's Antiques Roadshow. Executed in egg tempera the paintings were valued at £6,000 – £7,000 each.

=== Selected works ===
- Burning Limestone, tempera on paper, 46.5 x 58.3 cm, Newport Museum and Art Gallery
- Keel Lake, Achill Island, oil on board, 35.5 x 51 cm, Mount Stewart, (National Trust)
- A Derbyshire Farmstead, tempera on paper, 36.5 x 50 cm, Potteries Museum & Art Gallery
- Derbyshire Walls, tempera on canvas, 47.5 x 58 cm, Museums Sheffield
- Eyam, Derbyshire, c.1936, pencil and tempera on paper, 35.2 x 51.2 cm, Laing Art Gallery
- Industrial Landscape, Hope Valley, Derbyshire, c.1959, tempera on paper, 63.1 x 76.7 cm, Derbyshire & Derby School Library Service
- Portrait of a Lady, 1936, tempera on panel, 51 x 40.8 cm, The Hepworth Wakefield
- Rocky Landscape, (nd) oil on plywood, 46.5 x 51 cm, Government Art Collection
- Sheepdog Trials, 1930s, tempera on canvas, 47 x 61 cm, Buxton Museum and Art Gallery
- Summer, 1940, tempera on canvas, 50.4 x 60.8 cm, Glynn Vivian Art Gallery
- The Caravan, tempera on board, 36.5 x 50 cm, Homerton College, Cambridge
- The Derelict Farm, 1949, tempera on board, 48.3 x 59.7 cm, Harris Museum
- The Road to the Hills, tempera on board, 45.7 x 61 cm, Derby Museum and Art Gallery

== See also ==
- Vernon Hill
- Grant Wood
- Paul Nash
- Stanley Spencer

== Sources ==
- Basford, J., Harry Epworth Allen (1894–1958): Catalogue of His Works (2007), The Horizon Press and Derwent-Wye, ISBN 1-84306-332-8, ISBN 978-1-84306-332-2
