= Millbrook, Southampton =

Suburb of Southampton, England

Coordinates: 50.9157°N 1.4497°W

Millbrook
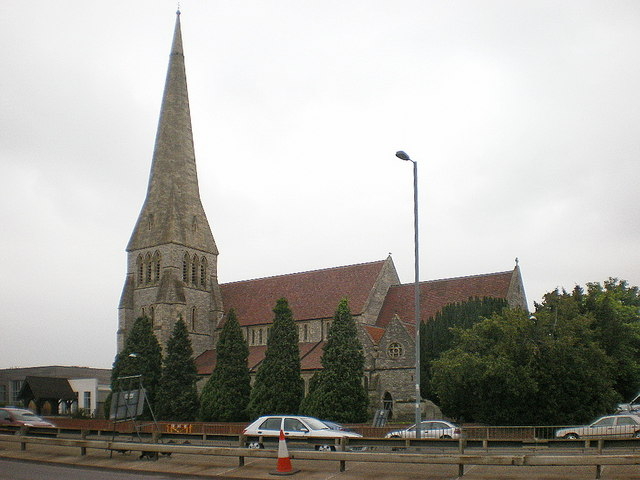
- Holy Trinity Church, Millbrook

- Location within Southampton
- Unitary authority: Southampton
- Ceremonial county: Hampshire
- Region: South East
- Country: England
- Sovereign state: United Kingdom
- Post town: SOUTHAMPTON
- Postcode district: SO15
- Dialling code: 023
- Police: Hampshire and Isle of Wight
- Fire: Hampshire and Isle of Wight
- Ambulance: South Central
- UK Parliament: Southampton Test

Millbrook is a suburb and former civil parish of Southampton, in the ceremonial county of Hampshire, England. As the area developed, several settlements grew within the parish, some of them becoming parishes in their own right, thus reducing the extent of the Millbrook parish. As well as the Millbrook of today, the original Millbrook parish included Freemantle, Regents Park, and Redbridge. Some of these areas are still referred to as being part of Millbrook. The brook that Millbrook was named after is now known as Tanner's Brook.

== History ==
On the 28 November 1830 in the context of the Swing riots there was a non violent protest in Millbrook and Shirley by laborers demanding increased wages. In the same decade Summers, Groves and Day opened a foundry in Millbrook. By 1840 they had begun a move to Northam with the Millbrook foundry closing in 1945.

Millbrook railway station was opened in 1861, and the parish formerly had open baths and a ferry to Marchwood.

The Church of the Holy Trinity was built between 1873 and 1880 to a design by Henry Woodyer. Previously the village church had been St Nicholas which became a mortuary chapel.

John Ralfs, the notable 19th-century botanist, was born here, as were footballers Kevin Gibbens and Phil Warner who both played for Southampton F.C., along with comedian Mike Osman.

On 16 May 1925, Lucy Hodder and the English artist Harry Epworth Allen were married at Holy Trinity Church. The village was bombed on the 20th July 1940.

The old village was almost entirely destroyed by the widening of Millbrook Road.

In 1965 Milbrook towers the then tallest building in the city was built in the estate to a design by Ryder and Yates. In 1969 the Church of the Holy Trinity was given grade II listed status.

In August 2022 the Church of the Holy Trinity was put up for sale due to falling congregation numbers.

In 1951 the civil parish had a population of 6386. On 1 April 1954 the parish was abolished and merged with Southampton and Eling. It is now in the unparished area of Southampton.

== Millbrook today ==
Millbrook as a district is split by the A35 dual carriageway, Tebourba Way. In general, on the west are council estates, and on the east are private housing, including Regents Park and Freemantle. The estates consist of Millbrook Park, Mansel Park, Wimpson Estate, Redbridge Estate, Maybush, Brownhill and the Channel Islands Estate. There is also an industrial area close to Southampton container port, which shares a boundary with Millbrook.

The main A33 road route into the city centre from the west passes through Millbrook, effectively creating the boundary between the industrialised part of Millbrook (to the south) and the residential areas (to the north).

Millbrook is home to the Western Community Hospital and a large Tesco supermarket. There is also a small retail park with a bowling alley and two hardware stores. Along Millbrook point road, there is Goals soccer centre, a 12-pitch five-a-side football ground. There is a lot of green park land in Millbrook, hence its full title of Millbrook Park Estate, this includes Green Park, Mansel Park, Test Park, Millbrook Recreation Ground, as well as numerous school playing fields. A huge green belt cuts through the main estate, from Millbrook roundabout, to the Top Shops on Windermere Avenue. Southampton City Farm run by the Oasis charity occupies 5 acres of land in Millbrook.
