= English Labour Network =

The English Labour Network was formed in 2017 to encourage the British Labour Party to recognise and embrace the distinct political identity of England, and to thereby strengthen support for the party throughout the country.

== Political positions ==
The group has called for the Labour Party to publish an English manifesto to reflect the many political challenges centered on England. The English Labour Network's formation reflects the lack of an English focus within Labour, with no equivalent to the Scottish Labour Party, Welsh Labour and the Labour Party in Northern Ireland.

It has advocated for regional ministers, wider celebrations on Saint George's Day, and a referendum on an English Parliament.

== Supporters ==
Founding supporters include John Denham, Jon Cruddas, Liam Byrne and Shabana Mahmood.

== See also ==
- Campaign for an English Parliament
- English devolution
- English Liberal Democrats
- English nationalism
