= 1971 Southampton Itchen by-election =

UK parliamentary by-election

The 1971 Southampton Itchen by-election of 27 May 1971 was held after the Speaker of the House of Commons and Member of Parliament (MP) Horace King retired. The seat was gained by the Labour Party (although King had initially sat as a Labour MP). The by-election was noted for the strong performance of the far right National Democratic Party, who had developed a following in the constituency.

== Result ==
Southampton Itchen by-election, 1971
Party	Candidate	Votes	%	±%
Labour	Bob Mitchell	22,575	55.36	N/A
Conservative	James Spicer	12,900	31.63	New
National Democratic	Edwin Bray	3,090	7.58	−14.32
Liberal	Joseph Cherryson	2,214	5.43	New
Majority		9,675	23.73	N/A
Turnout		40,779		
Labour gain from Speaker		Swing		

== Previous result ==
General election 1970: Southampton Itchen
Party	Candidate	Votes	%	±%
Speaker	Horace King	29,417	67.2	−18.2
National Democratic	Edwin Bray	9,581	21.9	New
Independent	B. H. Phillips	4,794	11.0	New
Majority		19,836	45.3	−25.5
Turnout		43,792	54.1	+5.1
Speaker hold		Swing		
