= Regents Park, Southampton =

Coordinates: 50.92°N 1.44°W

Regents Park
- Location within Southampton
- Unitary authority: Southampton
- Ceremonial county: Hampshire
- Region: South East
- Country: England
- Sovereign state: United Kingdom
- Post town: SOUTHAMPTON
- Postcode district: SO15
- Dialling code: 023
- Police: Hampshire and Isle of Wight
- Fire: Hampshire and Isle of Wight
- Ambulance: South Central
- UK Parliament: Southampton Test

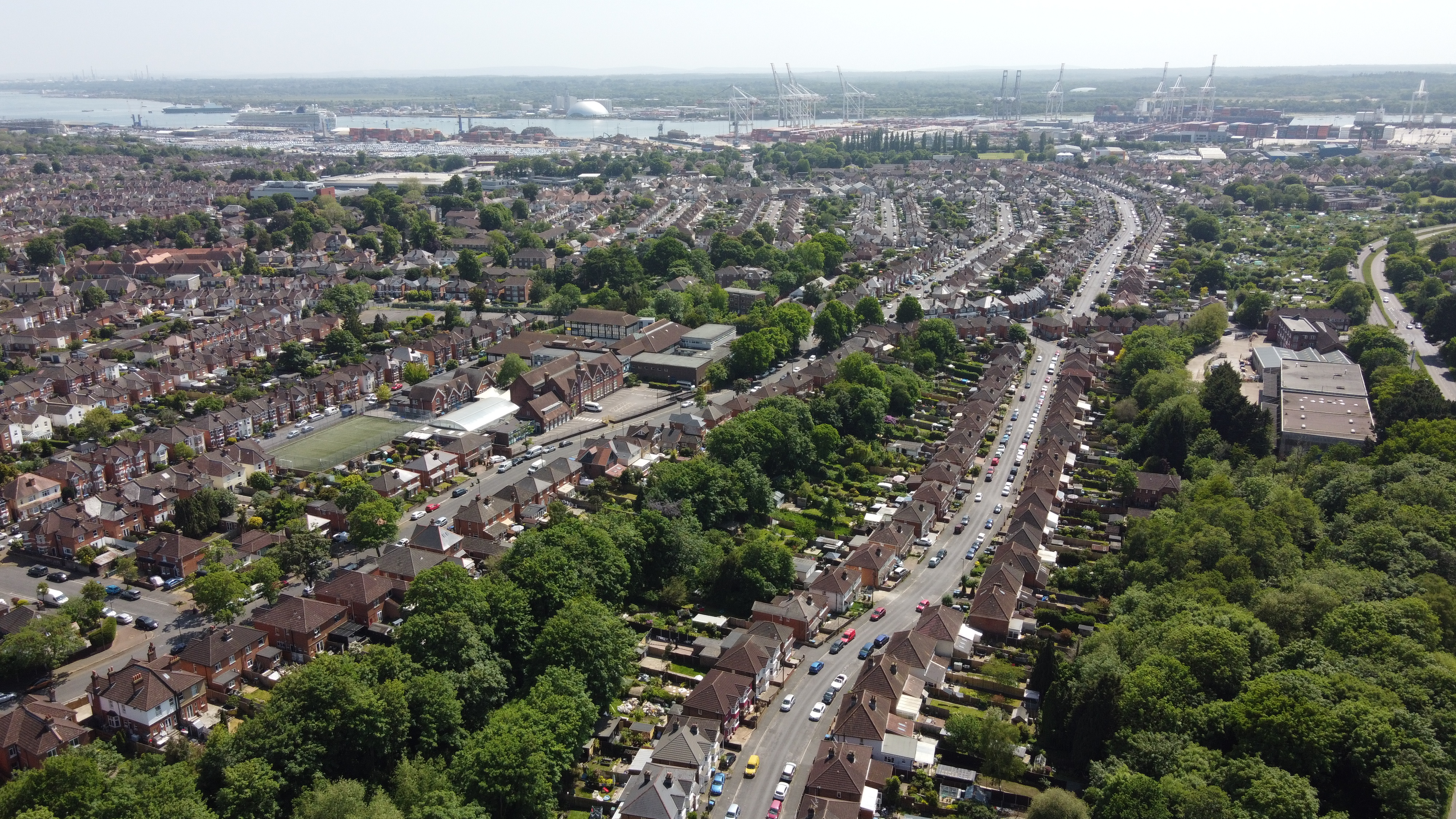
An aerial view of Regents Park

Regents Park is a suburb of Southampton in England. A large house and grounds, after which the area is named, formerly occupied the land with the current Regents Park Road following the route of the Carriage Drive. A former gatehouse or lodge which once guarded the entrance to this still stands at the junction Bard of Regents Park Road, Waterhouse Lane and St Edmunds Road. Victorian "villa" style houses occupying the Northern part of Regents Park Road represent the initial phase of redevelopment following demolition of the large house. Later Victorian and then Edwardian properties followed before much of the Southern part of the road was given over to 1930s style semi-detached and detached housing. This phase of development eventually extended West to King George's Avenue and North to Oakley Road and South to what is now the main Millbrook Road. It is this area which is now generally known as Regents Park, although the description is a loose one and is also taken to include the housing between Oakley Road and Shirley High Street / Romsey Road, which is also the location of the former Regents Park girls school, now Regents Park Community College. The area now consists mainly of private housing, and it is sometimes seen as being part of neighbouring Millbrook or Shirley. Millbrook neighbours Regents Park to the west, with Shirley to the north and Freemantle to the east. Southampton's container port and Southampton Water are to the south.

The area is home to the headquarters of the Southampton City Scout District.

== History ==
Iron Age pottery has been discovered in the area, although no evidence for settlements in that period exists.

Several buildings in Regents Park were bombed in the Second World War; the White House Garage, a shop and part of the nearby British American Tobacco factory were hit in the very first raid.
