= Royston Smith =

British politician

Royston Smith GM

Member of Parliament for Southampton Itchen
- In office 7 May 2015 – 30 May 2024
- Preceded by: John Denham
- Succeeded by: Darren Paffey

Leader of Southampton City Council
- In office 14 July 2010 – 16 May 2012
- Preceded by: Alec Samuels
- Succeeded by: Richard Williams

Personal details
- Born: 13 May 1964 (age 62) Harefield, Southampton, Hampshire, England
- Party: Conservative
- Other political affiliations: Referendum Party (in 1997)
- Website: roystonsmith.co.uk

Military service
- Allegiance: United Kingdom
- Branch/service: Royal Air Force

Royston Matthew SmithGM (born 13 May 1964) is a British Conservative Party politician and who served as Member of Parliament (MP) for Southampton Itchen from 2015 to 2024, when he stood down. Smith was previously a councillor on the Southampton City Council. He received the George Medal for disarming a sailor who had killed a Royal Navy officer during Smith's 2011 visit to a submarine.

== Early life and career ==
Smith was born on 13 May 1964 Harefield, Southampton to Frank Wilmot and Marie Cecilia Smith (née Page). He grew up in the suburb of Bitterne Park, and attended Bitterne Park School.

He became an engineer for the Royal Air Force (RAF) in 1980, working on the Hawker Siddeley Nimrod fleet for 10 years. Smith then worked for British Airways as an aeronautical engineer at London Heathrow for 16 years.

Smith owned the local bike shop Triangle Cycles in Bitterne Park from 1993 to 2003, and was the chairman of the Triangle Traders' association. He set up a public relations consultancy, Vigilo Ltd, in 2006. He has been a director of 3S Fire Ltd, a fire management consultancy affiliated with the HFRS since 2013.

== Local political career ==
Smith joined the Conservative Party after the 1997 general election. He had previously voted for the single issue Eurosceptic Referendum Party. He was first elected as a Conservative councillor for the Harefield ward in the 2000 Southampton City Council election. Smith had previously unsuccessfully contested the council elections in 1998 as an independent candidate and in 1999 as a Conservative. He was a cabinet member for economic development on the council between 2007 and 2010. He was the leader of the council until 2012 when the Labour Party took over the council.

Smith was appointed as chairman of Hampshire Fire and Rescue Service (HFRS) in 2009 and was re-appointed in 2014.

In April 2011, while Smith was visiting the nuclear submarine HMS Astute (S119) as part of the tour, a sailor started shooting with a SA80 rifle, and killed an officer. Smith intervened and helped to disarm and apprehend the sailor. He was awarded the George Medal for his actions.

== Parliamentary career ==
Smith stood as a Conservative candidate in the Southampton Itchen constituency in the 2010 general election. He came second in the seat, losing by 192 votes to the incumbent Labour MP John Denham. Smith was elected as MP for the constituency in the subsequent 2015 general election. Smith was re-elected in the 2017 and 2019 general elections.

Smith is a member of the UK Delegation Parliamentary Assembly of the Organization for Security and Co-operation in Europe. Smith has also participated in the OSCE's election monitoring activities in the United States, Italy, Hungary, Russia, and Kazakhstan.

In June 2023, he announced his intention to stand down at the 2024 general election.

=== House of Commons Select Committee Membership ===
Smith sat on the Work and Pensions Select Committee between December 2016 and May 2017. He was a part of the Committees on Arms Export Controls between October 2017 and July 2018.

Smith has been a member of the Foreign Affairs Select Committee since September 2017. He has the best attendance record out of all committee members, at 100%.

=== Brexit ===
Smith supported Brexit in the 2016 UK EU membership referendum. He voted for Prime Minister Theresa May's Brexit withdrawal agreement on 29 March 2019. Smith also voted against any referendum on a withdrawal agreement in the indicative votes on 27 March. He then voted for the Prime Minister Boris Johnson's Brexit withdrawal agreement in October.

In 2019, he successfully helped secure Government Brexit contingency funding for Southampton after writing a letter to Secretary of State for Housing, Communities and Local Government James Brokenshire. He made the case that Brexit-related gridlock caused by disruption at south coast ports could have a major impact on hospitals and other services. Smith believed Southampton needed tens of thousands of pounds to cope with what he described as "every eventuality" in the letter. A few days afterwards, Southampton was awarded £273,000 to help the port cope with the impact of Brexit.

=== The Cladding Crisis ===
Several private residential buildings in Southampton Itchen are being affected by the United Kingdom cladding crisis. Smith and Stephen McPartland tabled amendments to the Building Safety Bill in 2021. The amendments include zero-VAT rating for all remediation work and waking watch costs, a government-backed insurance scheme, and legislative protection to prevent costs being passed down to leaseholders. Amendment NC4 requires the government to create a fund into which all builders of higher-risk buildings, residential mortgage lenders and residential building insurers must make contributions. No builder will be able to obtain building control approval to construct any building unless it becomes a member of the Scheme and pays its dues. Leaseholders and leaseholder representative groups giving evidence to the Public bill committee said the Smith-McPartland amendment on a Building Safety Indemnity Scheme (NC4) will help leaseholders.

Prior to the Building Safety Bill, Smith and McPartland tabled amendments to the Fire Safety Bill in 2020, designed to protect leaseholders from having to foot the bill for necessary remedial works focused on potentially unsafe cladding affixed to the buildings in which they reside. The amendments were defeated by 320 votes to 256.

Following the Secretary of State Michael Gove's announcements to protect leaseholders with new laws to make industry pay for building safety, Smith wrote for the Building Safety Council in April 2022. In the article, Smith welcomed the government’s reset on its approach to fire safety based on the idea of proportionality, as leaseholders will be protected from the costs of remediating dangerous cladding. However, Smith said that he believes "that the insurers have gotten off too lightly and I have made my views known to the Secretary of State and in debates in Parliament".

=== Levelling Up ===
In 2019, writing in The Times, Smith made the case for 'levelling up' before it was adopted as Government policy. Smith associated Southampton with post-industrial towns to argue that Government Ministers should look South not just North when it comes to Government priorities in regenerating cities. In an article for The Daily Telegraph in 2020, Smith similarly called on the Government to 'level up' Southampton, suggesting that Southampton was one of the first red wall seats gained from Labour when he became the Conservative MP for the city in 2015.

=== Spitfire Memorial ===
In 2018, Smith met with the Minister with responsibility for coastal communities to discuss his campaign to honour the Spitfire and how Southampton could put in a bid to help fund a fitting memorial to the aircraft. R. J. Mitchell designed the Spitfire in Southampton and its first flight was from Eastleigh Airport.

On 28 March 2017, Smith held a Westminster Hall debate in Parliament calling on the Government to help fund The National Tribute to The Royal Air Force in Southampton. The debate received support from MPs on all sides of the house.

In Chancellor Rishi Sunak's first budget in 2020, it was announced that a planned memorial to commemorate the Spitfire is to receive a £3 million grant from the government. The year 2020 saw the 80th anniversary of the Battle of Britain. Smith said the £6m scheme required matching funding.

=== Campaigning ===
In 2010, Smith campaigned for Itchen College to retain government funding following government cuts, to protect Southampton's estate regeneration programme and for investment into Woolston shopping parade.

In 2023, Smith was successful in his campaign to get a new University Technology College (UTC) to open in Southampton.

== Personal life ==
Smith lives in Peartree, Southampton.

== Controversies ==
As council leader in 2011, Smith initiated an up to 5.5% pay cut on council employees as part of a bid to cut the council's expenditure by £76 million by 2015. In response, unions took industrial action by refusing to collect rubbish. In 2011, Smith was stopped by police for not wearing a seat belt and later found to have been driving an uninsured car. He was fined and given six points on his driving licence.

On 20 February 2016, Smith was named by The Independent as Britain's least active MP out of the MPs that were newly elected in 2015. Smith defended his record by stating that "Southampton is a challenging constituency and I spend my time doing as much as I can locally. I don't spend hours in the House of Commons waiting to make a three-minute speech." Smith has a second job working as a consultant to a property firm. Royston Smith (Conservative) has received £18,000 since May 2020 for 30 hours' work as a consultant for a property company.

After the 2015 election, UKIP candidate Kim Rose claimed that he had received data on voters in the constituency and advice from Smith to assist his campaign. Smith denied the allegations. Police looked into the matter and said Smith had no case to answer. Smith's local party association, Southampton Itchen Conservative Association was registered with the Information Commissioner's Office, and the Conservative Party Chairman at the time, Lord Feldman, wrote to complainants to say that no data protection breach had occurred.

In December 2017, Smith, the former owner of a bicycle shop, suggested cyclists should only use roads with cycle lanes on them, stating that cyclists should "consider when and where they cycle" in order to "make the roads safer". The comments came after a 64-year-old cyclist died after colliding with a lorry on Portsmouth Road, Woolston. He was criticised by campaigners on the grounds that "we should be encouraging more people to use the roads, not less", while it was subsequently reported that Smith had previously called for £11.5 million in grant funding for the city's cycling strategy, such as creating new cycle lanes, to be diverted elsewhere.

Smith was accused by members of the opposition of 'callousness' after claiming £1 in parking expenses to visit a food bank in his Southampton Itchen constituency in November 2021.

Parliament of the United Kingdom
Preceded by John Denham	Member of Parliament for Southampton Itchen; 2015–2024	Succeeded by Darren Paffey
