= Christopher Chope =

British politician (born 1947)

Sir Christopher Chope OBE MP
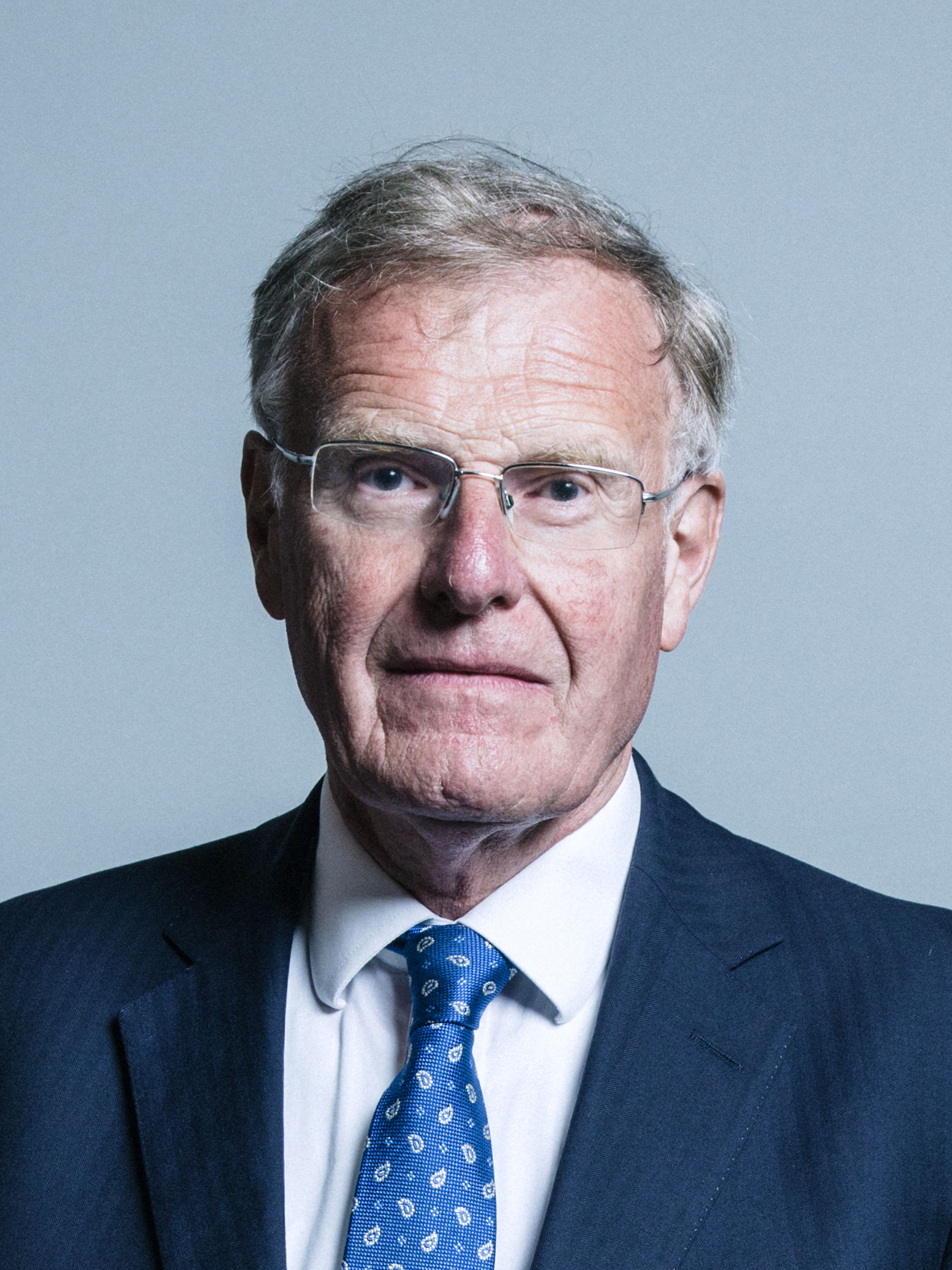
- Official portrait, 2017

Parliamentary Under-Secretary of State for Transport
- In office 22 July 1990 – 10 April 1992
- Prime Minister: Margaret Thatcher; John Major
- Preceded by: Robert Atkins
- Succeeded by: Kenneth Carlisle

Parliamentary Under-Secretary of State for the Environment
- In office 10 September 1986 – 22 July 1990
- Prime Minister: Margaret Thatcher
- Preceded by: George Young
- Succeeded by: Patrick Nicholls

Member of Parliament
- Incumbent
- Assumed office 1 May 1997
- Preceded by: Diana Maddock
- Constituency: Christchurch
- Majority: 7,455 (15.8%)
- In office 9 June 1983 – 16 March 1992
- Preceded by: Bob Mitchell
- Succeeded by: John Denham
- Constituency: Southampton Itchen

Personal details
- Born: Christopher Robert Chope; 19 May 1947 (age 79) Putney, London, England
- Party: Conservative
- Spouse: Christine Mary Hutchinson (m. 1987)
- Children: 2
- Education: University of St Andrews
- Website: www.chrischope.com

Sir Christopher Robert Chope OBE (born 19 May 1947) is a British politician and former barrister who has served as the Member of Parliament (MP) for Christchurch in Dorset since 1997. A member of the Conservative Party, he was first elected in 1983 for Southampton Itchen, but lost this seat in 1992 to Labour. He returned to Parliament in 1997 and has remained an MP ever since.

== Early life ==
Christopher Chope was born in Putney, the son of Pamela (née Durell) and Robert Charles Chope (1913–1988), a circuit judge and former judge of county courts. He was privately educated at the St Andrew's Preparatory School in Eastbourne and then Marlborough College. He then attended Queen's College at the University of St Andrews (now the University of Dundee) where he was awarded an LLB degree in 1970. He was a contemporary of Michael Fallon and Michael Forsyth, and was influenced by Madsen Pirie. He finished his education at the Inns of Court School of Law. Chope was called to the bar at the Inner Temple in 1972.

Chope was elected as a councillor on the Wandsworth London Borough Council in 1974 and became the council leader in 1979; he left the council on his first election to Parliament in 1983. Chope was appointed an Officer of the Order of the British Empire in the 1982 New Year Honours for services to local government.

== Parliamentary career ==
Chope was elected as an MP at the 1983 general election for Southampton Itchen where he defeated the Social Democratic Party (and previously Labour) MP Bob Mitchell by 5,290 votes and became the first Conservative MP for Southampton Itchen since the constituency was created in 1950.

Chope was appointed as the parliamentary private secretary to Peter Brooke, the Minister of State at the Treasury in 1986, before being promoted by Margaret Thatcher to serve in her government as the parliamentary under-secretary of state at the Department for the Environment later in the same year, where he was responsible for steering through the Council Tax legislation, the replacement for the community charge or Poll tax, which was withdrawn after a popular revolt. He was moved under the leadership of John Major to serve in the same rank at the Department of Transport from 1990 until he lost his Southampton Itchen seat to John Denham at the 1992 general election.

Following his defeat, Chope took up a consultancy as a thought leadership advisor with Ernst & Young in 1992, but was re-elected at the 1997 general election for the Christchurch constituency. In 1997, he became a spokesman on the Environment, Transport and the Regions as well as being the Vice Chairman of the Conservative Party under William Hague, but left the frontbench later that year when he became a member of the Trade and Industry Select committee. He returned to the frontbench after the 2001 election as a spokesman on the Treasury. In 2002, he moved to Transport, then left frontbench politics after the 2005 general election. He currently serves on the Panel of Chairs.

During the expenses scandal of 2009, it emerged that Chope claimed £136,992 in parliamentary expenses in 2007–8. This included claiming £881 to repair a sofa.

Chope was criticised following remarks made on 17 January 2013 when he referred to House of Commons dining room staff as "servants" in a speech.

Chope was appointed a Knight Bachelor in the 2018 New Year Honours for political and public service. Following the 2024 general election, Chope was appointed as acting Second Deputy Chairman of Ways and Means.

Chope has published regular commentary on aspects of his Bills and political views, including as a contributor to the Amazon #1 bestseller Canary in a Covid World and the Canary in a Climate World collections of essays.

=== Political views ===
Chope is generally to the right of the party and was chairman of the Thatcherite Conservative Way Forward group between 2001 and 2009.

On 10 February 2009 Chope co-sponsored an Employment Opportunities Bill to the House of Commons, which would have enabled workers to opt out of the minimum wage. The bill was objected to and later dropped.

The Guardian reported in 2010 that Chope was sceptical of climate change and attended a meeting of climate change sceptics in the Palace of Westminster in October 2010.

Chope voted against the legislation for same-sex marriage in 2013. In March 2019 Chope was one of 21 MPs who voted against LGBT inclusive sex and relationship education in English schools.

In October 2022 Chope said that Rishi Sunak would be unable to unite the Conservative Party as Prime Minister. In 2024 Chope stated, with regard to the leadership contender Kemi Badenoch during the 2024 Conservative Party leadership election: "As much as I like Kemi, she is preoccupied with her own children, quite understandably", and stating that Robert Jenrick brought more energy to the campaign.

In 2023 he attended a conference hosted by the Hungarian prime minister, Viktor Orban.

==== Euroscepticism ====
Chope has consistently supported Britain's withdrawal from the European Union. Chope helped to lead backbench support for the motion calling for a referendum to leave the European Union. He was heavily involved in the use of private member's bills to achieve this aim. Prior to the 2016 referendum, he announced his support for Brexit. He has been supportive of Leave Means Leave, a Eurosceptic pressure group. In March 2023 Chope voted against the Windsor Framework.

=== Parliamentary initiatives ===
In June 2013 Chope was one of four MPs who camped outside Parliament in a move to facilitate parliamentary debate on an 'Alternative Queen's Speech' – an attempt to show what a future Conservative government might deliver. 42 policies were listed including reintroduction of the death penalty and conscription, the privatisation of the BBC, banning the burka in public places, holding a referendum on same-sex marriage and preparing to leave the European Union.

In July 2017 Chope and Peter Bone, the Conservative MP for Wellingborough and Rushden, tabled 73 bills between them, of which 47 were placed by Chope. In order to be at the front of the queue to table the bills, the pair had camped in the Palace of Westminster for three days. Chope's bills included legislation to privatise the BBC and Channel 4, limit the interest rate chargeable on student loan debt (and forgive it in certain circumstances), reduce stamp duty, and decriminalise TV licence-dodging. Because of the number of slots for bills they took, Chope and Bone were criticised, including by Paul Flynn, for their actions.

Some of Chope's Private Members' Bills have been successfully implemented as law. In 2023, a Bill passed all of its House of Commons stages on one day and was enacted, with the consequence that pitch fees for park home residents can only increase by the consumer prices index rather than the retail prices index. Other legislative proposals contained in Chope's Private Members' Bills have been adopted in Government legislation, for example, those which outlaw drug driving.

==== Objecting to Private Members Bills ====
Chope is a member of a group of backbench Conservative MPs who regularly object to private members bills which, in their view, have not received sufficient scrutiny. These have included a number which were previously believed to have widespread public and parliamentary support.

The BBC's parliamentary correspondent, Mark D'Arcy, said the group claims to "make a practice of ensuring that what they see as well-meaning but flabby legislation is not lazily plopped on to the statute book by a few MPs on a poorly attended Friday sitting." Chope said that he objects on principle to legislation being introduced to the statute books without debate: "[T]his is something I have fought for in most of my time as an MP and it goes to the very heart of the power balance between the government and Parliament. The government is abusing parliamentary time for its own ends and in a democracy this is not acceptable. The government cannot just bring in what it wants on the nod."

There are multiple examples of Private Members' Bills to which Chope has objected "because he does not agree with legislation being brought before Parliament on a Friday without enough time for a full debate", they had not been debated and/or, in his view, had received selective criticism. In 2014 Chope voted against requiring all companies with more than 250 employees to declare the gap in pay between the average male and average female salaries. On 15 June 2018, Chope blocked the passage of a private member's bill that would have made upskirting a specific offence because the Bill had not been debated. Chope stated that his reason for blocking the passage was in objection to parliamentary procedure rather than to the bill itself: he stated that he would "wholeheartedly" support a government bill that outlawed upskirting. Chope's actions drew immediate criticism from fellow MPs, including some in his own party.

== Personal life ==
On 20 April 1987, Chope married Christine Mary, daughter of Robert Hutchinson, of Wimborne, in Wimborne Minster. Prior to their marriage, Christine had been employed as Chope's House of Commons' secretary and researcher for three years. They have two children.

Parliament of the United Kingdom
| Preceded by Bob Mitchell | Member of Parliament for Southampton Itchen; 1983–1992 | Succeeded by John Denham |
| Preceded by Diana Maddock | Member of Parliament for Christchurch; 1997–present | Incumbent |
