= John Fletcher-Cooke =

British politician (1911–1989)

Sir John Fletcher-Cooke (8 August 1911 – 19 May 1989) was a British Conservative Party politician.

In World War II Fletcher-Cooke joined the R.A.F. and was captured by the Japanese in Singapore. He was a prisoner for three and a half years, mostly in Japan; he wrote about his experiences in "The Emperor's Guest".

He rejoined the colonial service after the war and was posted to Malta and Palestine. From 1948 to 1951 he was a counsellor in the U.K. Mission to the U.N. in New York, where he met his future wife, Alice Egner.

He served five years as colonial secretary, Cyprus, and later deputy governor, Tanganyika.

He was the Conservative candidate at the Luton by-election in November 1963, following the resignation of the former "radio doctor" and Conservative Minister Charles Hill. Hill had a majority of over 5,000 at the 1959 general election, but the Luton seat was won by the Labour candidate Will Howie with a majority of 3,749.

Fletcher-Cooke entered the House of Commons the following year at the 1964 general election, as member of parliament for Southampton Test. However, he lost his seat two years later, at the 1966 general election, to Labour's Bob Mitchell, and never re-entered parliament.

His younger brother Charles Fletcher-Cooke, was Conservative MP for Darwen from 1951 to 1983. The two clashed in the House of Commons over the Labour government's imposition of sanctions against Rhodesia, following the colony's Unilateral Declaration of Independence (UDI) in 1965 under Ian Smith. John opposed sanctions, but his brother supported them.

== Family ==
John was the son of Charles Arthur Cooke (1883–1914) and Gwendoline May née Bradford (1883–1977). He married Louise Bradner in 1936; their marriage was dissolved in 1948. Fletcher-Cooke subsequently married Alice E Egner on 3 September 1949 in New York and latterly Marie L Fournier de la Barre (in 1977).

Parliament of the United Kingdom
Preceded by John Howard	Member of Parliament for Southampton Test; 1964–1966	Succeeded by Bob Mitchell
