= Darren Paffey =

British politician

Darren Paffey MP
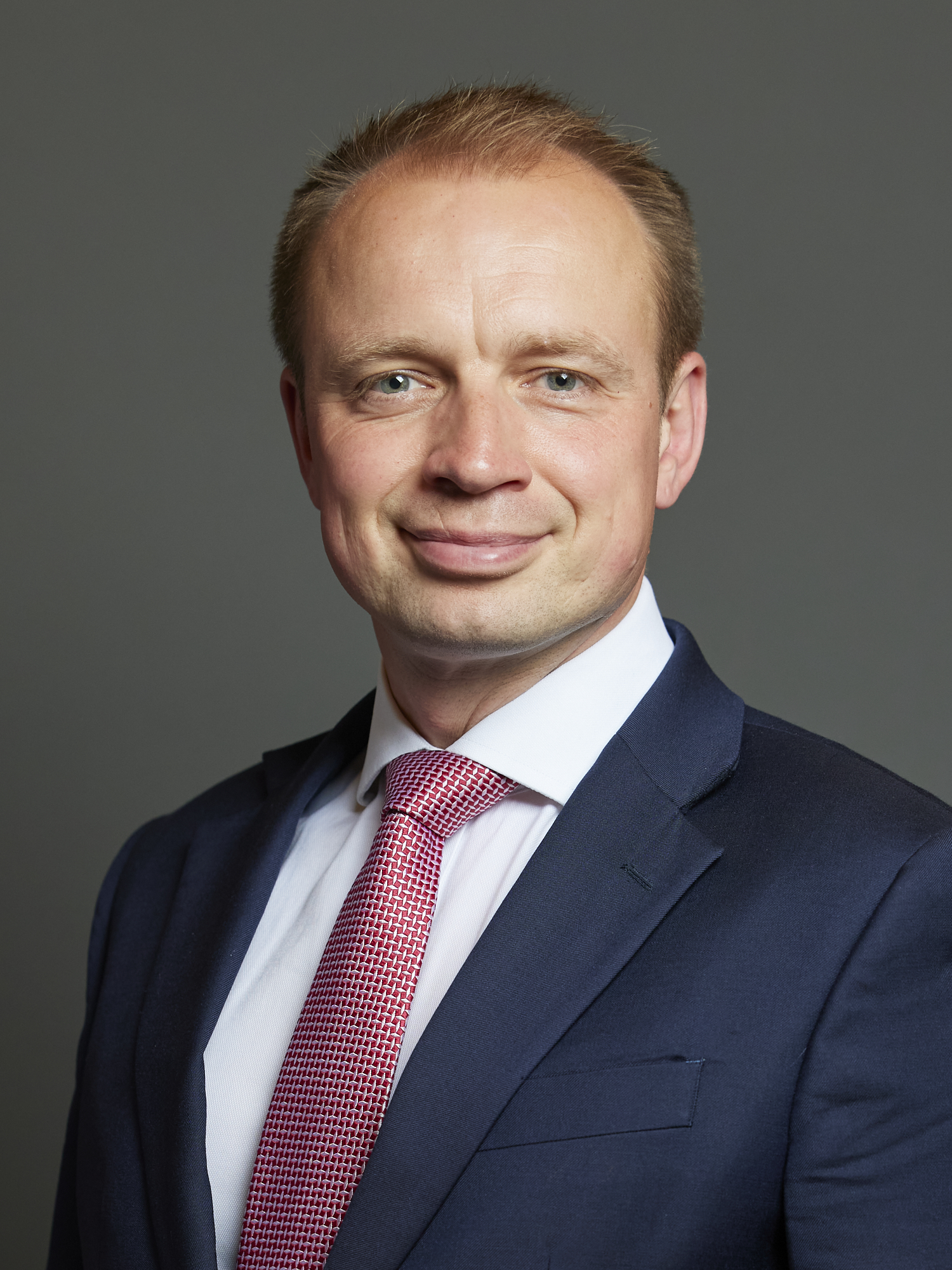
- Official portrait, 2024

Member of Parliament for Southampton Itchen
- Incumbent
- Assumed office 4 July 2024
- Preceded by: Royston Smith
- Majority: 6,105 (16.1%)

Personal details
- Born: Tyneside
- Party: Labour
- Education: University of Southampton

Darren James Paffey is a British Labour Party politician who has been the Member of Parliament for Southampton Itchen since 2024.

== Education and academia ==
Paffey studied modern languages at the University of Southampton, where he has since been an Associate Professor of Spanish and Linguistics and teaches sociolinguistics and language policy.

== Political career ==
Paffey previously served as Deputy Leader of Southampton City Council and had represented Bargate ward on the City Council since 2011.

Paffey stood for parliament in the 2015 and 2017 General Elections for the Romsey and Southampton North constituency, increasing Labour's share of the votes on both occasions.

Paffey won his seat with 15,782 votes on 4 July 2024, beating the second place Conservative Party candidate, Sidney Yankson. The incumbent MP was Royston Smith GM, who had held the seat from 7 May 2015. Smith announced his retirement from frontline politics in 2023 and did not seek re-election in 2024.

In November 2024, Paffey voted against the Terminally Ill Adults (End of Life) Bill.

== Personal life ==
Paffey is Christian.
