= Bob Mitchell (British politician) =

British politician (1927–2003)

Richard Charles Mitchell (22 August 1927 – 18 September 2003), commonly known as Bob Mitchell, was a Labour Member of Parliament (MP) in the United Kingdom. He represented Southampton Test for Labour from 1966 to 1970, and Southampton Itchen for Labour from 1971 to 1981, and then the Social Democratic Party from 1981 to 1983.

== Early life ==
Mitchell was born in Southampton on 22 August 1927. He attended Taunton's Grammar School as a youth and graduated from the University of Southampton with a degree in Economics.

== Professional life: Education ==
Mitchell taught mathematics and science at several schools before eventually finding a position as Senior Master and Head of the Mathematics and Science Department of Bartley County Secondary School, becoming Deputy Head in 1965.

Mitchell was also an active member of the National Union of Teachers.

== Professional life: Politics ==
Mitchell became active in Labour party politics. He was elected of the Southampton borough council in 1955 and contested the safe Conservative seat of New Forest in the 1959 general election.

In the 1964 general election, Mitchell contested Southampton Test, which he lost by a mere 348 votes. However, upon contesting the seat again in the 1966 general election, Mitchell won the seat by over 2,000 votes, propelled by the momentum of the Labour landslide in that election. His hold on Southampton Test would prove to be tenuous. In the Conservative victory in the 1970 general election, Mitchell lost his marginal seat.

However, Mitchell was not out of the House of Commons for long. His former Parliamentary neighbour in Southampton Itchen, the Speaker of the House of Commons, Dr. Horace King, was elevated to the House of Lords in late 1970. Mitchell was selected as the Labour candidate for the seat in the resulting by-election in 1971, which he won by a majority of nearly 10,000.

Once he returned to the House of Commons, Mitchell quickly re-established his reputation as a "classic trades-union rightist" within the Labour Party. He was a firm Atlanticist and a stalwart defender of the constitutional monarchy, but was also in favour of the nationalisation of Britain's ports. He opposed abortion, thinking it would make it more difficult for childless couples such as him and his wife to adopt. He served as Shirley Williams' PPS and as an indirectly elected member of the European Parliament from 1975 to 1979. He acted as consultant to B.A.T Industries Ltd, part of British American Tobacco, which was a substantial employer in the Southampton area at the time.

After the 1979 election, Mitchell felt increasingly uneasy with the leftward drift of the Labour Party. However, he was rooted in the Labour movement and was loath to leave the party that he been a member of for nearly four decades. This deep sense of connection contributed to his initial reluctance to leave the Labour Party but, by May 1981, he had formally announced that he did not plan to stand for re-election as a Labour candidate in Southampton Itchen. However, not until after the Labour conference in the autumn of 1981 did he formally leave Labour for the SDP. When he left, he cited his opposition to "further nationalisation, import controls and withdrawing Britain from the Common Market."

In the 1983 general election, Mitchell finished second with 16,647 votes, 5,290 votes behind the Conservative winner, Christopher Chope. Once out of parliament, Mitchell served as a lecturer in Business Studies at Eastleigh College of Further Education. He tried for selection as SDP candidate for the 1984 Portsmouth South by-election but lost out to Mike Hancock who went on to win the seat. He contested Southampton Itchen again in the 1987 election as the Liberal-SDP Alliance candidate, but finished third behind Chope and the Labour candidate, John Denham. Mitchell died in his native Southampton on 18 September 2003.

== Family life ==
Bob Mitchell was married to Doreen Lilian Mitchell (Nee Gregory). The couple adopted two children.

Parliament of the United Kingdom
Preceded by John Fletcher-Cooke	Member of Parliament for Southampton Test; 1966–1970	Succeeded by Sir James Hill
Preceded by Horace King	Member of Parliament for Southampton Itchen; 1971–1983	Succeeded by Christopher Chope
