= James Hill (Conservative politician) =

British Conservative politician

- Sir James along with his wife, Lady Susan Hill

Member of Parliament for Southampton Test
- In office 3 May 1979 – 8 April 1997
- Preceded by: Bryan Gould
- Succeeded by: Alan Whitehead
- In office 18 June 1970 – 20 September 1974
- Preceded by: Bob Mitchell
- Succeeded by: Bryan Gould

Personal details
- Born: 21 December 1926
- Died: 16 February 1999 (aged 72)
- Party: Conservative
- Spouse: Susan
- Children: Five

Sir Stanley James Allen Hill (21 December 1926 – 16 February 1999) was a British Conservative Party politician.

== Early life ==
Hill was born in Southampton, the son of a Merchant Navy officer. He was educated at Regent's Park School, Southampton, North Wales Naval Training College, and University College, Southampton. He acquired pilot's, radio officer's and navigator's licenses, then at age 21 he began working as aircrew for the British Overseas Airways Corporation, mainly on Solent flying boats. He also worked for Aden Airways for three years.

In 1960 he became a partner in Waller and King, local estate agents, then a director of Clanfield House Developments and Second Clanfield Properties. In 1964 Hill became a partner in a 100 acre farm near Romsey in Hampshire, which housed 1,500 Large White pigs, making him a wealthy man.

== Political career ==
Hill was elected to Southampton City Council in 1966. He was twice Member of Parliament (MP) for the marginal Southampton Test seat, from the 1970 to October 1974 general elections and again from the 1979 general election until 1997. At the end of both these terms he lost the seat to the Labour candidate, firstly to Bryan Gould (who he then defeated in 1979) and latterly to Alan Whitehead on a 10.5% swing.

Described by political biographer Andrew Roth as "a gut right-winger" and "a local crusader against vandals, pub thugs, kerb-crawlers and prostitutes", Hill nonetheless held liberal views on social issues. He favoured allowing gay sex at 16, and sought to licence sex shops as a first step towards licensing brothels. He also opposed fox hunting and featured on a "blacklist" of anti-hunting MPs targeted by Field magazine before the 1997 election. He campaigned against tyre-clampers and the privatisation of the local Royal Ordnance Survey, and supported exemption from optical charges for the partially sighted, as well as introducing two bills to enable publicans to bar known thugs. Hill chaired various House of Commons' committees and served on the powerful Procedure Committee. He was knighted in 1996.

Hill was a Member of the European Parliament (MEP) from 1973 to 1975, and campaigned vigorously to stay in the European Economic Community in the 1975 referendum on the issue. He also served on the Council of Europe. He opposed the Common Agricultural Policy, however, due to its effects on pig farming.

== Personal life ==
He married Susan Ralph in 1958, and they had two sons and three daughters. His wife moved to Kings Somborne after her husband's death in 1999. Lady Susan died in 2008, aged 83.

== Sources ==
- "Times Guide to the House of Commons", Times Newspapers Limited, 1997
- Whitaker's Almanack, The Stationery Office, 2000.

Parliament of the United Kingdom
Preceded by Bob Mitchell	Member of Parliament for Southampton Test; 1970–October 1974	Succeeded by Bryan Gould
Preceded by Bryan Gould	Member of Parliament for Southampton Test; 1979–1997	Succeeded by Alan Whitehead
