= John Howard (Southampton Test MP) =

British Conservative Party politician

John Melbourne Howard
- Born: 1913; South Croydon
- Died: 10 August 1982 (aged 68–69)
- Occupation: a British Conservative Party politician

John Melbourne Howard (1913 – 10 August 1982) was a British Conservative Party politician.

Howard was educated at Whitgift School, South Croydon. He served in the Royal Navy (1941–46), in minesweepers during World War II, holding the rank of sub-lieutenant. He worked as a chartered accountant.

In the 1945 general election, Howard stood as a Liberal in Croydon North, coming third. He joined the Conservative Party and became a councillor on the London County Council (LCC) in 1949, representing Hammersmith South. In 1951, he was Conservative candidate in Hammersmith North, without success. He became an alderman of the LCC in 1952 until 1954.

In 1955, Howard was elected Member of Parliament for Southampton Test, defeating Labour's candidate Anthony Crosland. He stood down in 1964.

Parliament of the United Kingdom
Preceded by Horace King	Member of Parliament for Southampton Test; 1955–1964	Succeeded by Sir John Fletcher-Cooke
