= Alan Whitehead =

British Labour politician

The Right Honourable The Lord Whitehead CBE
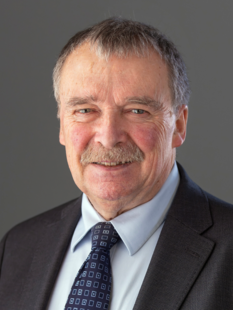
- Official portrait, 2026

Minister of State for Energy Security and Net Zero
- In office 11 November 2025 – 20 July 2026 Serving with Michael Shanks
- Prime Minister: Keir Starmer
- Preceded by: The Baroness Curran
- Succeeded by: The Baroness Curran

Shadow Minister for Energy Security (Note: Green New Deal and Energy (2020–23), Energy and Climate Change (2015–20))
- In office 8 October 2016 – 4 July 2024
- Leader: Jeremy Corbyn; Keir Starmer
- Preceded by: Himself
- Succeeded by: Andrew Bowie
- In office 18 September 2015 – 28 June 2016
- Leader: Jeremy Corbyn
- Preceded by: Jonathan Reynolds
- Succeeded by: Himself

Shadow Minister for Waste and Recycling
- In office 14 January 2020 – 9 April 2020
- Leader: Jeremy Corbyn
- Preceded by: Sandy Martin
- Succeeded by: Position abolished

Parliamentary Under-Secretary of State for Transport, Local Government and the Regions
- In office 11 June 2001 – 28 May 2002
- Prime Minister: Tony Blair
- Preceded by: Office established
- Succeeded by: Office abolished

Member of the House of Lords
- Lord Temporal
- Life peerage 19 November 2025

Member of Parliament for Southampton Test
- In office 1 May 1997 – 30 May 2024
- Preceded by: James Hill
- Succeeded by: Satvir Kaur

Personal details
- Born: 15 September 1950 (age 76) Isleworth, Middlesex, England
- Party: Labour
- Education: University of Southampton
- Website: Official website

Academic background
- Thesis: Petitions, Parliament and the public: an analysis of the changing nature of corruption, 1868–1883 (1976)

Alan Patrick Vincent Whitehead, Baron Whitehead CBE (born 15 September 1950) is a British Labour Party politician who served as Member of Parliament (MP) for Southampton Test from 1997 to 2024. He served as Shadow Minister for Energy Security, previously Green New Deal and Energy, from 2015 to 2024. He served as a Parliamentary Under-Secretary of State for Transport, Local Government and the Regions from 2001 to 2002.

== Early life and career ==
Alan Whitehead was born on 15 September 1950 in Isleworth, London, and attended Isleworth Grammar School. He studied Politics and Philosophy at the University of Southampton, where he became President of University of Southampton Students' Union and received a PhD degree in political science.

From 1979 to 1982, he was Director of OUTSET charity. From 1983 to 1992, he worked for the BIIT charity, where he was also a director.

Whitehead was the Leader of Southampton City Council from 1984 to 1992 and a professor of public policy at Southampton Institute. As leader of Southampton City Council in 1986, Whitehead proposed that the city council take measures to become a "self-sustaining city" with regard to energy generation. One such measure was the conversion of Southampton Civic Centre to being heated by local reservoirs of geothermal energy.

== Parliamentary career ==
=== House of Commons ===
At the 1979 general election, Whitehead stood as the Labour candidate in New Forest, coming third with 19.7% of the vote behind the incumbent Conservative MP Patrick McNair-Wilson and the Liberal candidate.

Whitehead stood in Southampton Test in three successive elections, 1983, 1987, and 1992. In 1983 with 28.1% of the vote behind the incumbent Conservative MP James Hill. He came second again in 1987 with 33.3% of the vote, again behind James Hill. In 1992 he again came second behind James Hill, with 42.4% of the vote.

At the 1997 general election, Whitehead was elected to Parliament as MP for Southampton Test with 54.1% of the vote and a majority of 13,684.

He was re-elected as MP for Southampton Test at the 2001 general election with a decreased vote share of 52.5% and a decreased majority of 11,207.

From June 2001 to May 2002, Whitehead was Parliamentary Under Secretary of State in the Department for Transport, Local Government and the Regions.

Whitehead was again re-elected at the 2005 general election with a decreased vote share of 42.7% and a decreased majority of 7,018.

Whitehead's Private Members Bill was 'talked out' by Conservative backbenchers in 2005, but many of its most important aspects were incorporated into the Climate Change and Sustainable Energy Act 2006, sponsored by fellow Labour MP Mark Lazarowicz.

In June 2006, the UK Parliamentary Football Team ran a charity match in Portugal against the Portuguese Parliament, which coincided with part of the 2006 FIFA World Cup. The match and the trip were sponsored by McDonald's as part of their Football in the Community Programme. The UKPFC was criticised by the British Medical Association for accepting McDonald's sponsorship. Whitehead, who was the goalkeeper for the UKPFC, fully declared the sponsorship in his register of members interests. He also pointed out the trip was part of a long-standing fundraising campaign between the UKPFC and McDonald's that raised over 20,000 euros for local charities.

On 18 March 2003, Whitehead voted against the Iraq War on the basis of the mission not receiving endorsement from the UN.

Also in September 2006, Whitehead criticised the results of the Energy Review, and was the co-author of EDM 2204 which states 'the case for nuclear has not yet been made' and urges the government to 'recognise the enormous potential for reducing energy consumption and greenhouse gas emissions by energy efficiency and conservation, greater use of combined heat and power, and rapid investment in the full range of renewable technologies, including microgeneration'.

Due to the high concentration of houses in multiple occupation in Southampton, in May 2007 Whitehead proposed changing planning regulations which would mean a landlord would be required to apply for planning permission if they wanted to convert a family home into an HMO housing more than four people. The proposal was considered as part of the government's current review of the private housing sector, to report in October 2008.

Whitehead rebelled in October 2009 against a government 3-line whip on the renewal of the UK Trident programme. His rebellion was put down to the fact that he was a historical supporter of the Campaign for Nuclear Disarmament, having paid a subscription to Southampton CND in 1982.

At the 2010 general election, Whitehead was again re-elected with a decreased vote share of 38.5% and a decreased majority of 2,413.

Whitehead is an outspoken supporter of action on anthropogenic climate change, and in September 2013 called debate by members of parliament who reject the scientific view a "flat earth love-in".

Whitehead was again re-elected at the 2015 general election, with an increased vote share of 41.3% and an increased majority of 3,810.

He supported Owen Smith in the 2016 Labour Party (UK) leadership election.

From October 2016 to April 2020, Whitehead was Shadow Minister for Energy and Climate Change.

Whitehead was one of the 52 Labour MPs who defied Jeremy Corbyn and in February 2017 voted against triggering Article 50. He claimed that triggering Article 50 without clarity on what would be done was not in the UK's best interest, and he was not prepared to stand by and allow the country to go down what he regarded as a potentially very dangerous path.

At the snap 2017 general election, Whitehead was again re-elected with an increased vote share of 58.7% and an increased majority of 11,508.

Whitehead was again re-elected at the 2019 general election, with a decreased vote share of 49.5% and a decreased majority of 6,213.

In March 2020, Whitehead was appointed Shadow Minister for Energy and the Green New Deal.

In January 2022 Whitehead announced that he would be standing down at the next general election.

=== House of Lords ===
On 11 November 2025, Whitehead was appointed as Minister of State in the Department for Energy Security and Net Zero, and was nominated for a life peerage to sit as a member of the House of Lords. He was created as Baron Whitehead, of Saint Mary's in the City of Southampton on 19 November 2025.

On 21 July 2026, Whitehead was removed as Minister of State in the Department for Energy Security and Net Zero.

== Personal life ==
Whitehead married Sophie Wronska in 1979, and they have a son and daughter.

He is a member of the Saints Trust and plays in the UK parliamentary football team. After looking at the possibility of being the first MP to have a wind turbine installed on his constituency home roof in Highfield, Southampton, Whitehead installed a number of solar panels that were integrated into the roof. During the summer months, Whitehead says he sells electricity from this source back to the national grid.

He is a visiting professor in the Faculty of Media, Arts and Society at Southampton Solent University.

== Notes ==
Parliament of the United Kingdom
Preceded by James Hill	Member of Parliament for Southampton Test; 1997–2024	Succeeded by Satvir Kaur
