= John Denham (politician) =

English Labour politician (born 1953)

The Right Honourable John Denham FRSA
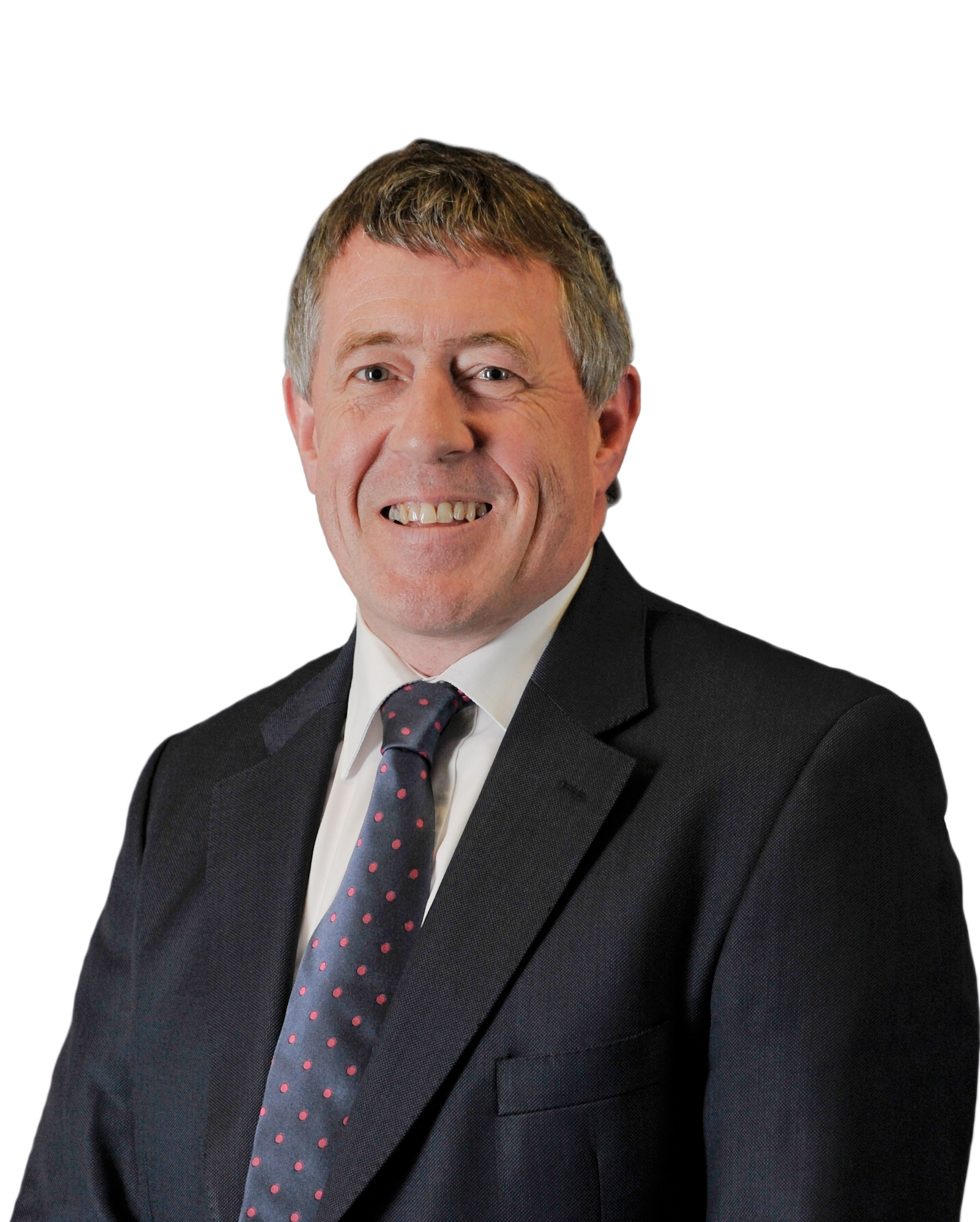
- Official portrait, 2009

Secretary of State for Communities and Local Government
- In office 5 June 2009 – 11 May 2010
- Prime Minister: Gordon Brown
- Preceded by: Hazel Blears
- Succeeded by: Eric Pickles

Secretary of State for Innovation, Universities and Skills
- In office 28 June 2007 – 5 June 2009
- Prime Minister: Gordon Brown
- Preceded by: Alan Johnson (Note: As Secretary of State for Education and Skills.)
- Succeeded by: Peter Mandelson (Note: As Secretary of State for Business, Innovation and Skills.)
Shadow Cabinet posts
Shadow Secretary of State for Business, Innovation and Skills
In office 8 October 2010 – 6 October 2011
Leader	Ed Miliband
Preceded by	Pat McFadden
Succeeded by	Chuka Umunna
Shadow Secretary of State for Communities and Local Government
In office 11 May 2010 – 8 October 2010
Leader	Harriet Harman (acting); Ed Miliband
Preceded by	Caroline Spelman
Succeeded by	Caroline Flint
Junior ministerial offices
Minister of State for Policing
In office 11 June 2001 – 12 June 2003
Prime Minister	Tony Blair
Preceded by	Paul Boateng
Succeeded by	Hazel Blears
Minister of State for Health Services
In office 30 December 1998 – 11 June 2001
Prime Minister	Tony Blair
Preceded by	Alan Milburn
Succeeded by	Jacqui Smith
Minister of State for Social Security
In office 29 July 1998 – 30 December 1998
Prime Minister	Tony Blair
Preceded by	Frank Field
Succeeded by	Stephen Timms
Further offices held
Parliamentary private secretary to the Leader of the Opposition
In office 8 October 2011 – 17 April 2013
Leader	Ed Miliband
Preceded by	Anne McGuire; Michael Dugher
Succeeded by	Karen Buck
Chair of the Home Affairs Select Committee
In office 14 June 2003 – 27 June 2007
Preceded by	Chris Mullin
Succeeded by	Keith Vaz
Member of Parliament for Southampton Itchen
In office 9 April 1992 – 30 March 2015
Preceded by	Christopher Chope
Succeeded by	Royston Smith

Personal details
- Born: 15 July 1953 (age 73) Seaton, England
- Party: Labour
- Spouse: Ruth Eleanor Dixon (divorced)
- Education: Woodroffe School
- Alma mater: University of Southampton

John Yorke Denham FRSA (born 15 July 1953) is an English politician who served as Secretary of State for Innovation, Universities and Skills from 2007 to 2009 and Secretary of State for Communities and Local Government from 2009 to 2010. A member of the Labour Party, he was Member of Parliament (MP) for Southampton Itchen from 1992 to 2015.

Denham served in government under Prime Minister Tony Blair from 1997 to 2003, as a Parliamentary under-secretary of state from 1997 to 1998 and a Minister of State from 1998 to 2003. He resigned from government over the Iraq War in 2003, and subsequently became Chair of the Home Affairs Select Committee. Denham returned to government in 2007 as a Member of Prime Minister Gordon Brown's Cabinet, which he served in until Labour's election defeat in 2010.

He was briefly Shadow Secretary of State for Communities and Local Government in 2010, and appointed by opposition leader Ed Miliband as Shadow Secretary of State for Business, Innovation and Skills later in the same year. Denham announced in 2011 that he would be standing down from Parliament at the next election, and held his final front bench position as Parliamentary private secretary to Miliband from 2011 to 2013.

== Early life ==
John Denham was born in Seaton, Devon, and attended Lyme Regis Grammar School in Lyme Regis, Dorset, and the University of Southampton, where he was awarded a Bachelor of Science degree in Chemistry, and served as president of the students' union in the academic year 1976–77.

After leaving education in 1977 he became an advice worker at the Energy Advice Agency in Durham, before becoming a transport campaigner with Friends of the Earth in 1978. He was Head of Youth Affairs at the British Council from 1979 until 1983, and was responsible for public education and advocacy for War on Want from 1984 to 1988. He subsequently worked for Christian Aid, Oxfam and other development agencies until his election to Westminster.

=== Councillor ===
Prior to being elected as an MP, Denham served as a local councillor, initially as a member of the Hampshire County Council in 1981, where he remained until 1989, when he was elected as a councillor on Southampton City Council, on which he served until 1993 and was the chairman of the city's Housing Committee. He was selected to contest the Southampton Itchen seat at the 1983 general election following the defection to the Social Democratic Party of the sitting Labour MP Bob Mitchell. The election proved to be a close-run affair, with Denham coming in third place, Mitchell in second, and the victor was the Conservative Christopher Chope who gained the seat with a majority of 5,290.

Denham again contested the seat at the 1987 general election, he overtook Mitchell into second place but was still behind Chope, who held his seat with a majority of 6,716.

== Member of Parliament ==
Denham took the seat at the third attempt at the 1992 general election, when he defeated Chope by just 551 votes and remained an MP for 23 years (since 1997 Chope has been MP for the safe Conservative seat of Christchurch, Dorset.). Mitchell did not fight the election this time. Denham made his maiden speech on 20 May 1992, reminding people that the Pilgrim Fathers left from Southampton, and not Plymouth as is widely thought, on their historic voyage to North America (Plymouth was a later port-of-call).

Denham has held the following positions:

- 1995–1997: Shadow Minister for Social Security;
- 1997–1998: Parliamentary under Secretary of State at the Department of Social Security;
- 1998–1999: Minister of State at the Department of Social Security;
- 1999–2001: Minister of State for Health Services;
- 2001–2003: Minister of State for Policing;
- 2003–2007: Chairman of the Home Affairs Select Committee;
- 2007–2009: Secretary of State for Innovation, Universities and Skills;
- 2009–2010: Secretary of State for Communities and Local Government;
- 2010–2011: Shadow Secretary of State for Business, Innovation and Skills;
- 2011–2013: Parliamentary private secretary to the Leader of the Opposition.

=== In government ===
Denham became a member of the Environment Select committee in 1993, and was promoted to the opposition frontbench by Tony Blair in 1995. He was a Shadow Minister for Social Security from 1995 to 1997, responsible for pensions and long-term care. Following the 1997 general election he entered the Blair government as the Parliamentary under-secretary of state at the Department of Social Security, being promoted within the department to the rank of Minister of State in 1998. Following the promotion to the cabinet of Alan Milburn, Denham moved to the Department of Health in 1999.

=== Resignation over Iraq War ===
Following the 2001 general election he became a Minister of State at the Home Office, until he resigned in March 2003 over the Iraq War.

After his resignation, Denham was appointed in July 2003 as chairman of the influential Home Affairs Select Committee. Despite speculation following the 2005 general election that he would return as a member of the Government, he did not do so, although in the post-election reshuffle there were reports that he was offered – and accepted – the cabinet post of Chief Secretary to the Treasury, before being told that the post had been assigned instead to Des Browne.

Though regarded as a Blairite, Denham was a regular critic of the Blair administration as chair of the Home Affairs committee.

=== Return to Government ===
Following Brown's installation as Prime Minister in June 2007, Denham was named to take over the new post of Secretary of State for Innovation, Universities and Skills. In September 2007, he announced funding for students taking second degrees would be re-allocated to allow more students to take first degrees: adult and continuing education institutions such as the Open University, Birkbeck, University of London, and lifelong learning departments throughout the country, have voiced angry protest at the proposals.

During Denham's tenure as Secretary of State, he also announced an extension of maintenance grants to students from households earning up to £60,000 a year. The changes mean that an additional 50,000 students would be entitled to a full grant and an additional 100,000 students would be entitled to a partial grant.

As part of the Cabinet reshuffle on 5 June 2009, Denham was appointed to the role of Secretary of State for Communities and Local Government. He replaced Hazel Blears who had resigned from the post on 3 June 2009.

On 7 October 2011, Denham announced that he would be standing down at the 2015 general election.

In June 2012, Denham said that Labour knew as early as 2005 that the immigration estimates they had relied on were "vastly wrong".

He was seen as a government loyalist and University of Southampton Students' Union had revoked his lifetime membership for his support of tuition fees.

== Post-parliamentary career ==
Denham is Chair of the Southern Policy Centre, which he co-founded with Professor Francis Davis, as a think tank responding to challenges and opportunities for southern England with specialisms in open data research and new forms of public participation in politics.

Denham is director of the English Labour Network and a Professorial Fellow on English Identity and Politics at Southampton University.

== Honours ==
Denham was sworn in as a member of the Privy Council of the United Kingdom in 2000, giving him the honorific title "The Right Honourable" for life. He is also a Fellow of the Royal Society of Arts, giving him the Post Nominal Letters "FRSA".

== Personal life ==
He married Ruth Eleanor Dixon and they have two children; they have now divorced. He has another child born in 2005.

In an interview with the Daily Telegraph, Denham stated that he was a secular humanist, although he also said he learnt a lot from his Church of England upbringing.

== Notes ==
Parliament of the United Kingdom
Preceded by Christopher Chope	Member of Parliament for Southampton Itchen; 1992–2015	Succeeded by Royston Smith
Political offices
Preceded by Alan Johnson as Secretary of State for Education and Skills	Secretary of State for Innovation, Universities and Skills; 2007–2009	Succeeded by Peter Mandelson as Secretary of State for Business, Innovation and Skills
Preceded by Hazel Blears	Secretary of State for Communities and Local Government; 2009–2010	Succeeded by Eric Pickles
Preceded by Eric Pickles	Shadow Secretary of State for Communities and Local Government; 2010	Succeeded by Caroline Flint
Preceded by Pat McFadden	Shadow Secretary of State for Business, Innovation and Skills; 2010–2011	Succeeded by Chuka Umunna
Preceded by Anne McGuire	Parliamentary private secretary to the Leader of the Opposition; 2011–2013	Succeeded by Karen Buck
