= Coxford, Southampton =

Electoral ward of Southampton, England

Coordinates: 50.934°N 1.442°W

Coxford is a Electoral Ward in the Unitary Authority of Southampton, England. It had a population of 14,232 at the 2001 census.
