= Fantine (disambiguation) =

Fantine is a fictional character in Victor Hugo's 1862 novel Les Misérables.

Fantine may also refer to:

- Fantine Harduin (born 2005), Belgian actress
- Fantine Lesaffre (born 1994), French swimmer
- Fantine (musician) (born 1984), Australian-Russian-Dominican singer and songwriter
- Fantine Thó (born 1979), Brazilian singer, songwriter, dancer and instructor
- Fantine (painting), a painting drawn by Margaret Bernadine Hall
- Fantine's Arrest, a song from Les Misérables
