= Sir John Simeon, 3rd Baronet =

British politician (1815–1870)

Sir John Simeon 3rd Baronet
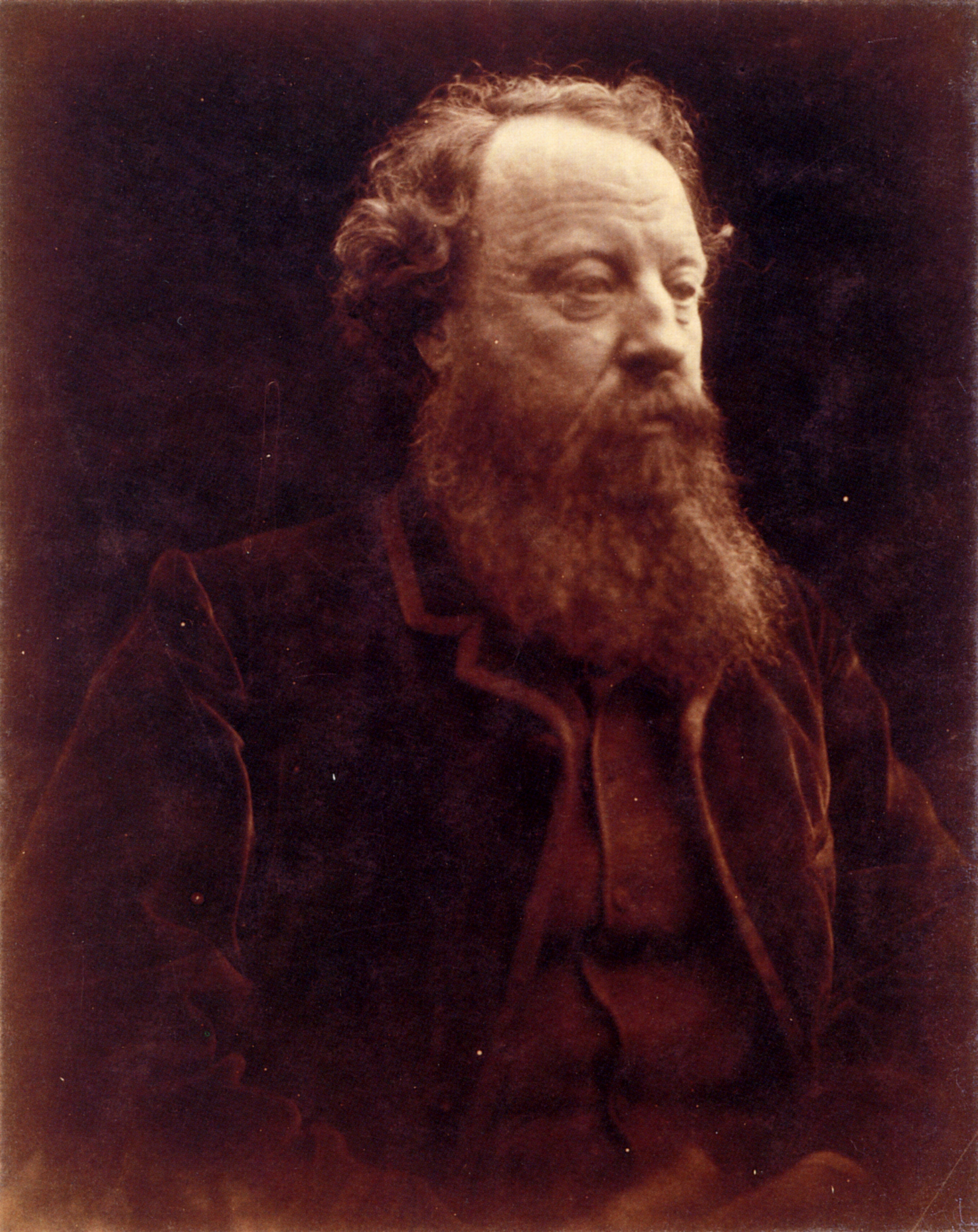
- Sir John Simeon, as photographed shortly before his death in 1870 by Julia Margaret Cameron

Member of Parliament for the Isle of Wight
- In office 1865 – 1870
- Preceded by: William à Court-Holmes
- Succeeded by: Edward Dawes
- In office 1847 – 1851
- Preceded by: Charles Cavendish Clifford
- Succeeded by: Alexander Baillie-Cochrane

Personal details
- Born: 5 February 1815 Isle of Wight, England
- Died: 21 May 1870 (aged 55) Freiburg, Grand Duchy of Baden
- Spouses: Jane Maria Baker (m. 1840; died 1860) Catherine Dorothea Colville (m. 1861)
- Relations: Charles Simeon (brother); Charles Colville, 1st Viscount Colville of Culross (brother-in-law)
- Parent: Richard Simeon (father)
- Education: Christ Church, Oxford (BA)
- Occupation: Politician, naval officer

Sir John Simeon, 3rd Baronet (5 February 1815 on the Isle of Wight – 21 May 1870 in Freiburg) was a British politician and naval officer.

== Biography ==
Simeon was born on the Isle of Wight in 1815. He was the eldest son of Sir Richard Simeon, 2nd Baronet and his wife Louisa Edith Barrington, the oldest daughter of Sir Fitzwilliam Barrington, 10th Baronet. He received his education at Christ Church, Oxford, from where he graduated with a BA in 1837.

His first marriage was on 26 November 1840 to Jane Maria Baker, daughter of Sir Frederick Francis Baker, 2nd Baronet. Sir John Simeon, 4th Baronet and Sir Edmund Charles Simeon, 5th Baronet were sons from this marriage. His wife died in 1860, and he remarried in the following year to the Honourable Catherine Dorothea Colville, a sister of Charles Colville, 1st Viscount Colville of Culross.

=== Career ===
He initially pursued a naval career before being returned for the Isle of Wight in 1847 as a Whig Member of Parliament. On 27 March 1848, he became a member of the Canterbury Association and immediately joined the management committee. The object was to create an Anglican settlement in New Zealand, which happened with the Canterbury region, with Christchurch as its capital. Together with Lord Lyttelton, Lord Richard Cavendish and Edward Gibbon Wakefield, he guaranteed £15,000 to the Canterbury Association in April 1850, which saved it from financial collapse.

In 1851 he converted to Catholicism, and resigned his seat in Parliament through appointment as Steward of the Manor of Northstead on 5 May 1851, "out of a delicate instinct of honour towards those who had elected him while he was a member of the Anglican Church — believing that he had no right to suppose them to be indifferent to the change he had made."

He resigned from the Canterbury Association shortly afterwards on 15 May 1851. He was elected again for the same constituency in 1865, already a Liberal, for a time serving as the only Roman Catholic Member of Parliament from an English constituency.

During the invasion scare of 1859–60 he raised the 2nd (Newport) Isle of Wight Rifle Volunteer Corps and commanded it with the rank of captain, dated 27 August 1860. Shortly afterwards the 2nd RVC was included in the 1st Administrative Battalion, Isle of Wight Rifle Volunteers, and he was promoted to major to serve as its second-in-command.

His last political act, on 8 April 1870, was to speak in Parliament against a measure proposed by Charles Newdigate Newdegate for the state inspection of convents, despite being seriously ill at the time. Bursting a blood-vessel in his throat, he set off on a journey to Switzerland to recover his health but died en route while in Freiburg, aged 55.

=== Legacy ===
Simeon Street in Ryde, Isle of Wight, is named after him, as well as the Simeon Arms Public House in the same street. The Simeon Monument stands at the junction of Castle Road in Newport. Simeon Quay in Lyttelton, New Zealand is named for the Simeon family. Simeon Street in the Christchurch suburb of Spreydon is named for his brother Charles.

Coat of arms of Sir John Simeon, 3rd Baronet
Crest A fox passant-reguardant Proper in the mouth a trefoil slipped Vert. Escutcheon Per fess Sable and Or a pale counterchanged in chief an ermine spot of the first between two trefoils slipped of the second and in base a like trefoil between two like ermine spots. Supporters Dexter a fox reguardant Proper in the mouth a trefoil slipped Vert, sinister a lion Gules ducally crowned Or. Motto Serviendo; Nec Temere Nec Timide

Parliament of the United Kingdom
Preceded by William à Court-Holmes	Member of Parliament for Isle of Wight; 1847–1851	Succeeded by Edward Dawes
Preceded by Charles Cavendish Clifford	Member of Parliament for Isle of Wight; 1865–1870	Succeeded by Alexander Baillie-Cochrane
Baronetage of the United Kingdom
Preceded by Richard Godin Simeon	Baronet of Grazeley, Berkshire; 1854–1870	Succeeded by John Stephen Barrington Simeon
