= Charles Simeon (colonist) =

New Zealand colonist (1816–1867)

Captain Charles Simeon
- Born: 9 December 1816; Grazeley, Berkshire, England
- Died: 29 May 1867 (aged 50); Hursley, Hampshire, England
- Known for: Leading roles in colonial Lyttelton and Christchurch, New Zealand
- Parent: Sir Richard Simeon, 2nd Baronet
- Relatives: Sir John Simeon, 3rd Baronet (brother); Cornwall Simeon (brother); Philip Williams (father-in-law); Sir Fitzwilliam Barrington, 10th Baronet (grandfather); Sir John Simeon, 1st Baronet (grandfather); Charles Simeon (great-uncle)

Captain Charles Simeon (9 December 1816 – 29 May 1867) was one of the members of the Canterbury Association who emigrated to Canterbury in New Zealand in 1851. The family spent four years in the colony and during this time, he held various important posts and positions. He returned to England in 1855. He was devoted to the Anglican church and three of his sons became priests, while two of his daughters married priests.

== Early life ==
Charles Simeon was born in Grazeley, Berkshire, England in 1816 into a wealthy family. He was baptised in St Helens on the Isle of Wight, where his family came from. He was the second son of Sir Richard Simeon, 2nd Baronet and his wife Louisa Edith Barrington, the oldest daughter of Sir Fitzwilliam Barrington, 10th Baronet. Nothing is known about his education. On 5 May 1842, he married his second cousin, Sarah Jane Williams (1818 – 3 April 1903) at Winchester. She was the daughter of Philip Williams KC, whose wife Jane Blachford also had Sir Fitzwilliam Barrington, 10th Baronet as her grandfather.

Simeon obtained the rank of captain in the 75th (Stirlingshire) Regiment of Foot. On 17 October 1850, he joined the Canterbury Association and immediately joined the management committee. The object was to create an Anglican settlement in New Zealand, which happened with the Canterbury region, with Christchurch as its capital. His elder brother John had been a founding member since March 1848, their younger brother Cornwall was to join the association in August 1851. His brother John probably also introduced Henry Sewell to the Canterbury Association; Sewell was to become a key member of the Association, and interacted greatly with Charles Simeon. Sewell became New Zealand's first Premier in 1856.

Charles Simeon gave £2,000 to his friend John Robert Godley for land purchase in the colony; Godley was one of the core members of the association, and is today regarded as the founder of Canterbury in New Zealand. His brother John left the Anglican church, left the Canterbury Association in May 1851, resigned his seat in Parliament, and joined the Church of Rome instead.

After the First Four Ships hired by the Canterbury Association to bring emigrants to Canterbury had left England in September 1850, Simeon became chairman of the Colonists' Society, an organisation of land purchasers. Amongst other roles, he addressed meetings of those who were interested in emigrating.

When news that Godley had resigned his position as the agent for the Canterbury Association reached the management committee in London in October 1851, they looked for a successor. Sewell was their first choice, but he was in charge of sorting out the Association's financial affairs and saw a conflict of interest. Sewell suggest that William Fox be appointed instead. The management committee, at its meeting on 2 December 1851, appointed Captain Simeon as Godley's successor; at that point, Simeon had already reached New Zealand.

== New Zealand ==
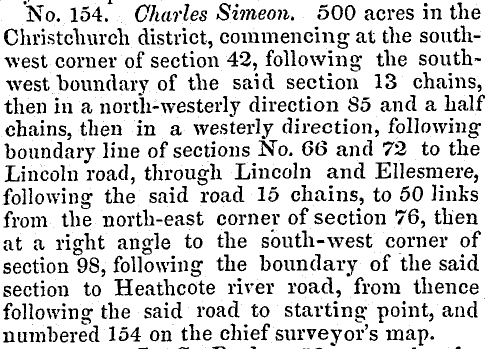
Description of the land chosen by Simeon as it appeared in the Lyttelton Times

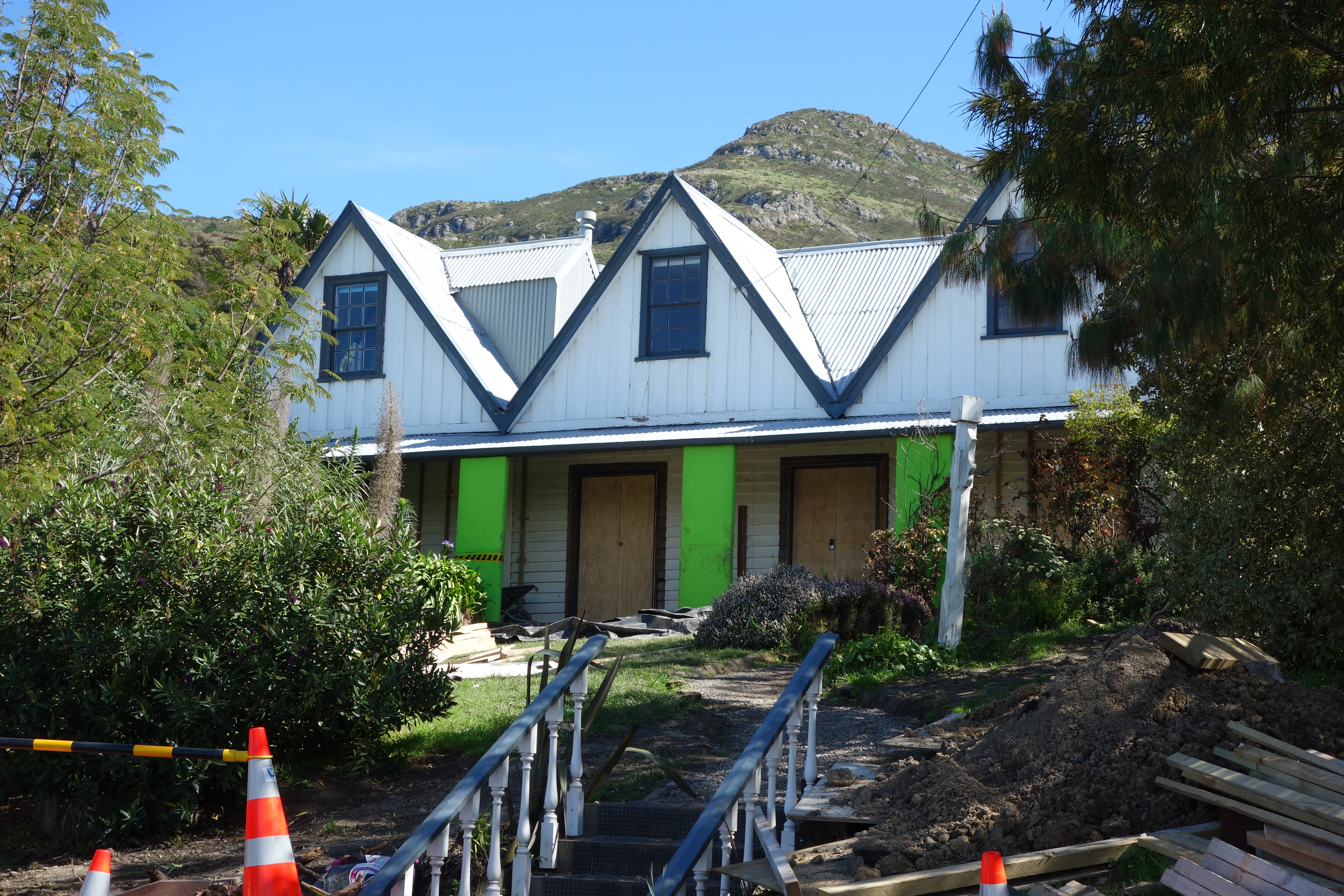
Captain Simeon's house undergoing earthquake repairs in 2016

The Simeon family with five children, a housekeeper, a governess, a lady's maid, a housemaid, a nurse, a cook and a footman left England from the East India Docks on 18 June 1851 on the ship Canterbury and arrived on 21 October in Lyttelton. Lyttelton inhabitants were amazed about the size of the party. The children and servants were put up at the Mitre in Lyttelton at a cost of £4 10s per day until he had found a town house to rent on the Bridle Path. He bought town section 102 in Lyttelton's Coleridge Street (today Coleridge Terrace), not far from the rented house, and built a substantial house with eight rooms near where the Bridle Path goes over the hill to Christchurch. This latter house is still standing and is registered as a Category II historic place by Heritage New Zealand.

Within weeks of his arrival, Godley resigned as resident magistrate and the role was conferred to Simeon by the Governor of New Zealand, George Grey, with whom he met. In this role, he commissioned a lock-up in Christchurch, which was built by Isaac Luck in the Market Place. On behalf of the Canterbury Association, he brought 1,500 books to Canterbury, which were to be given to the colony's college.

Simeon also took on the role of representative of the Canterbury Association from Godley. He resigned from that position in July 1853, when some functions of the Association were transferred to Guise Brittan as the region's land agent, and other functions to Henry Sewell, who had arrived from England.

Late in December 1851, Simeon put his name forward to be elected onto the Council of the Society of Land Purchasers, but Guise Brittan, the council's chairman, announced that the role was incompatible with that of a Resident Magistrate, and Simeon therefore withdrew his name. Shortly afterwards, he was appointed Visiting Justice of the Gaol at Lyttelton.

Simeon chose 500 acres (2.0 km^{2}) of land and had frontages with the road leading to the Ōpāwaho / Heathcote River and the road leading from Christchurch to Halswell. The land was numbered in the order of it having been chosen, and his land was thus known as Rural Section 154. He also owned town properties in Armagh, Gloucester, Manchester and Madras Streets.

Like other wealthy colonists, Simeon participated in horse races, which were held in Hagley Park. He also played cricket.

He joined the church building committee for Lyttelton's first church, the Holy Trinity Church that was to be the disastrous start to Benjamin Mountfort's career in New Zealand. He is one of the four original Church Property Trustees of the Anglican Diocese of Christchurch; the others were Henry Jacobs, Octavius Mathias (the first vicar of the Church of St Michael and All Angels), and Conway L. Rose. The Anglican Church Property Trustees still exist today and are regulated by the Anglican (Diocese of Christchurch) Church Property Trust Act 2003.

Together with Godley, he was on the Road Committee that was to progress the Sumner Road (the road from Lyttelton to Christchurch via Evans Pass and Sumner).

Simeon was the returning officer for many of the early elections held in Canterbury. When it came to the election of the first Superintendent for the Canterbury Province, Simeon made the controversial decision of allowing Colonel James Campbell to stand for election, but declaring that should he be elected, he would not allow the election as Campbell was not on the Akaroa roll. In November 1852, Simeon announced his intention to stand in the first election for the New Zealand Parliament. In June 1853, he advertised that he had changed his mind, as his role as Resident Magistrate kept him too busy that he could leave the region for long periods attending Parliament in Auckland, and that he would stand for election in the Christchurch Country electorate for the Canterbury Provincial Council instead. He received the power from the Governor to appoint a deputy returning officer in case he wanted to stand in one of the elections himself. Five candidates stood for the four positions, and Simeon was at the top of the poll with 158 votes; the other successful candidates were Henry Tancred (154 votes), John Hall (151 votes), and Charles Bowen (132 votes). Simeon was the first Speaker of the Provincial Council from September 1853 to April 1855; he was succeeded in that role by Charles Bowen. He was a member of the Canterbury Executive Council from October 1853 to October 1854 and was the first Provincial Treasurer. During a day of low attendance in October 1854, Richard Packer secured a suspension of the council's standing orders, which allowed him to have the first two readings of a bill to enlarge the council's membership by 12 additional members passed. Whilst there was justification for such a measure due to the long session lengths, the Executive Council consisting of Henry Tancred, Henry Godfrey Gouland, Simeon, and William John Warburton Hamilton regarded the matter as a vote of no confidence and resigned. Simeon was a provincial councillor until his resignation on 5 September 1855 in preparation for returning to England. The resulting by-election was contested by three candidates and won by James Henry Moore.

Simeon chaired a large number of meetings in early colonial Christchurch and Lyttelton. He was a good, forceful speaker and could be entertaining.

Simeon was a Freemason. When Christchurch's St Augustine Lodge was inaugurated in October 1853, he acted as the secretary for the lodge. He entered various home grown vegetables to the December 1853 Horticultural Exhibition and received first prize for his broad beans, and came second with peas, potatoes, and lettuces.

The Simeons left Lyttelton on the Maori on 8 December 1855. There were no plans to return; their furniture was sold by auction a week later. Their departure was much regretted by Henry and Elizabeth Sewell, as the Simeons were the only people with whom they had engaged socially.

== Family and commemoration ==
The Simeons had five children before they emigrated to New Zealand, including:

- Philip Barrington Simeon (12 December 1845 – 9 December 1926; buried at St Peter and St Paul's, Lingfield, Surrey)
- Algernon Barrington Simeon (20 February 1847 – 12 March 1928)
- Geoffrey Barrington Simeon (9 March 1848 – 2 March 1906)

While in New Zealand, they had three more children:

- Jane Elizabeth (27 November 1851 – 24 February 1852)
- Lionel Barrington Simeon (6 November 1852 – 30 August 1896)
- Walter Barrington Simeon (24 February 1854 – 30 April 1854)

After they left New Zealand, they had at least four more children:

- Emma Mary Simeon (28 October 1856 – 7 February 1933)
- Hugh Barrington Simeon (12 January 1858 – 21 January 1941)
- Beatrice Anna Simeon (c. February 1859 – 20 March 1859)
- Mabel Selina Simeon (26 August 1860 – 11 January 1935)

All his sons had Barrington as their middle name in commemoration of their maternal grandfather, who had no heir and whose baronetcy thus became extinct. Three of his sons became priest: Philip in Grahamstown, Algernon in Yattendon, and Hugh at Bolton Abbey in North Yorkshire. Two of his daughters married priests: Emma married Alfred Willis, who became bishop of Honolulu; and Mabel married Rev. Herbert Andrew Dalton, who was headmaster of Felsted School in England and then Harrison College in the Diocese of Barbados.

Charlotte Godley, the wife of John Robert Godley, did not have a high opinion of Sarah Jane Simeon. In one of her letters to her mother, Godley wrote:

I never saw anyone like Mrs Simeon as a talker and manager of everything and everybody. She has managed her own servants all out of the house already and changed some of the new ones ... When she wants a new servant, instead of it being a perfectly simply open affair, there is as much intrigue about it as about any secret piece of diplomacy. She is of course unpopular and drags him into her affairs too, and then she thinks it is all "the Colony".

Simeon died on 29 May 1867 in Hursley, Hampshire, after a long illness. Simeon Quay in Lyttelton, New Zealand is named for the Simeon family. Simeon Street in the Christchurch suburb of Spreydon is named for Charles Simeon. Simeon's widow requested through land agents Richard J. S. Harman and Edward Cephas John Stevens that Wilderness Road (which formed one of the boundaries of rural section 154) be renamed Barrington Road in honour of the 10th Baronet. This request was granted in 1885, and it is today known as Barrington Street. His widow died on 3 April 1903 at Bournemouth, England.
