= Burton Park =

Country house in Duncton, West Sussex, England

Coordinates: 50.9487°N 0.6232°W

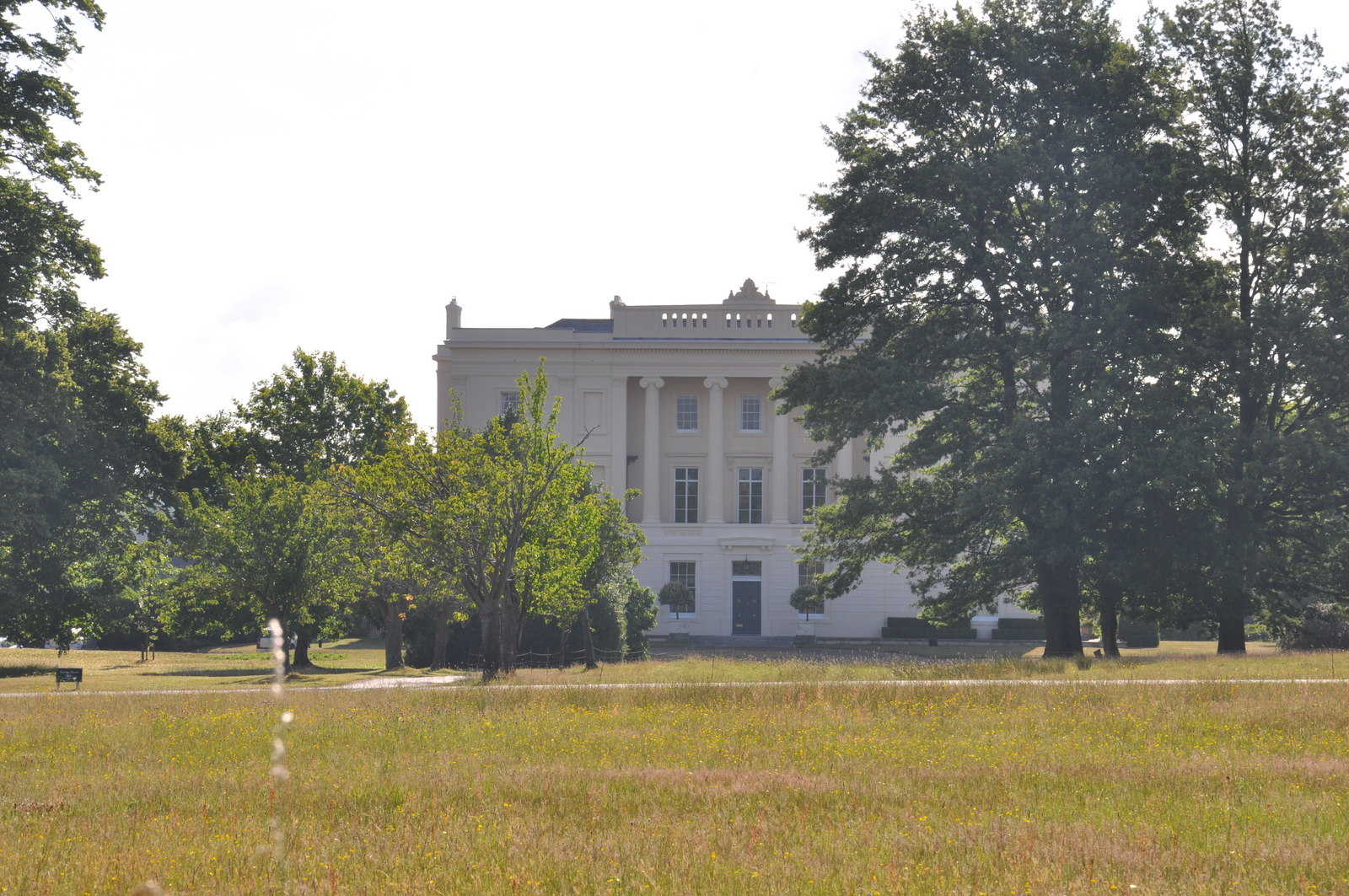
Burton Park

Burton Park is a 19th-century country house in the civil parish of Duncton in West Sussex, and is situated 1/2 a mile to the east of the village of Duncton, within its own estate. It is a Grade I listed building, now converted into multiple occupation.

== Ecclesiastical parish ==
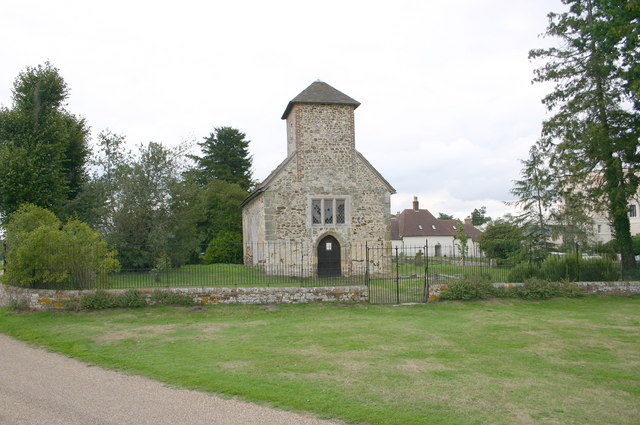
"Burton Church", since 2003 dedicated to St Richard a tiny Norman church standing 100 metres north-west of the mansion house

It is now situated within the Church of England ecclesiastical parish of Barlavington St Mary, the church of which is situated about 1 mile to the south. Within the grounds and standing 100 metres north-west of the mansion house stands Burton Church, since 2003 dedicated to St Richard, a tiny Norman church and grade I listed building now in the ecclesiastical parish of Burton with Coates, in which survive many ancient monuments to the Goring family of Burton Park.

== Description ==
The mansion was built in three storeys faced with Roman cement and has a five-bay west-facing entrance frontage and a 10-window eastern frontage. The interior contains a Grecian hall and an impressive staircase possibly rescued from Michelgrove near Arundel, which was demolished in 1828. The staircase had been built in 1800 and made of cast and wrought bronze with a figure of a greyhound on alternate steps and is largely responsible for the house's Grade I listing.

The house is surrounded by 6 hectares of pleasure gardens, parkland and formal gardens laid out in 1738 and subsequently altered in the 1920s and 1930s. The parkland dates from the 13th century and was landscaped in the 18th and 19th century.

== History ==
The Burton Park estate was inherited in the 15th century by the Goring family, who probably built the first house on the site. When Sir William Goring died in 1724 the property passed by marriage to the Biddulphs. The present house was built about 1828 by architect Henry Bassett for John Biddulph after a fire in 1826 had destroyed the previous house, which had been designed in 1739 by Italian architect Giacomo Leoni. The property passed down within the Biddulph family until in 1894 it was bought by Sir Douglas Hall, 1st Baronet, who sold it in 1919 to Major John Sewell Courtauld and Mrs Courtauld. Major Courtauld was Member of Parliament for Chichester Division from 1924 until his death in 1942. They renovated the interior and added new formal features to the gardens. The house and park were requisitioned by the army during the Second World War after which the house, gardens and southern half of the park were sold to St Michael's School.

St Michael's, a girls’ boarding school, remained in occupation until the 1980s after which, in 1994, the site became a police dog-training centre. Since then the house has been divided into apartments.
