= Sir Douglas Hall, 1st Baronet =

British politician

Coat of arms of Sir Douglas Hall, 1st Baronet

Crest
A talbot's head erased Sable ears Argent gorged with a chaplet Or garnished with roses Gules between two cross crosslets fitchee Gold.
Motto
In Deo Fides

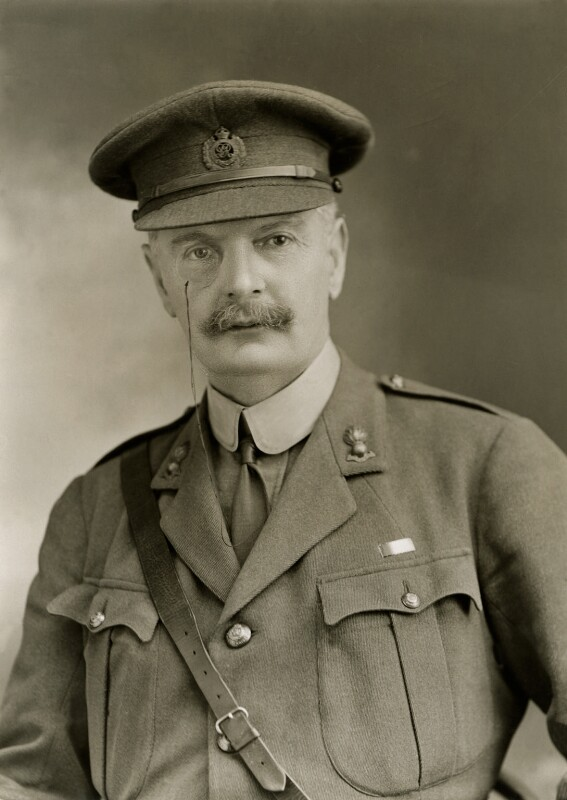
Hall in 1918

Sir Douglas Bernard Hall, 1st Baronet (24 December 1866 – 30 June 1923) was a British Conservative Party politician.

The son of Bernard Hall, Mayor of Liverpool, he was a justice of the peace and lived at Burton Park, Petworth, Sussex. He was educated at Charterhouse School and Christ Church, Oxford. In 1890 he married Caroline Montgomery of New York State and in 1894 purchased Burton Park, West Sussex. A prominent landowner and lord of the manor of Barlavington, Burton and Crouch, he was appointed High Sheriff of Sussex for 1907.

In January 1910 he was elected to the House of Commons as Member of Parliament for the Isle of Wight, unseating the sitting Liberal member, Godfrey Baring. He held the seat until the 1922 general election.

Hall was a yachtsman, and on the outbreak of the First World War used his vessel in patrol work in the Solent and English Channel while the British Expeditionary Force was being moved to the continent. Later in the war he was president of the British Water Ambulance Fund and assisted the evacuation of injured soldiers via the River Seine. When the organisation was taken over by the War Office he received a commission as lieutenant in the Royal Naval Reserve. By the end of the war he had moved to High Explosives Department of the Ministry of Munitions, with the rank of captain in the Royal Engineers. He was created a baronet in 1919, and sold Burton Park in the same year.

In January 1922 he was involved in a motor accident in central London. He required surgery and never fully recovered his health, standing down from parliament that year. He died at his London home in the following year aged 56. He was buried at Putney Vale Cemetery.

Sir Douglas Bernard Hall was one of 10 children of Bernard Hall, who had been Mayor of Liverpool in 1879. His sister was Margaret Bernadine Hall (1863–1910), an artist who painted Fantine which is in the Walker Art Gallery, Liverpool. It was Sir Douglas Bernard Hall who presented the picture to the gallery in 1911.

Parliament of the United Kingdom
| Preceded by Godfrey Baring | Member of Parliament for Isle of Wight; 1910–1922 | Succeeded by Sir Edgar Chatfeild-Clarke |
Baronetage of the United Kingdom
| New creation | Baronet (of Burton Park in the County of Sussex); 1919–1923 | Succeeded by Douglas Montgomery Bernard Hall |
