= Richard Simeon =

English Liberal Party politician

Sir Richard Simeon 2nd Baronet

Member of Parliament for the Isle of Wight
- In office 1832 – 1837
- Preceded by: Constituency created
- Succeeded by: William à Court-Holmes

Personal details
- Born: Richard Godin Simeon; 21 May 1784
- Died: 4 January 1854
- Party: Liberal Party
- Children: Charles Simeon; John Simeon
- Parent: Sir John Simeon, 1st Baronet (father)

Coat of arms of Richard Simeon
Crest A fox passant-reguardant Proper in the mouth a trefoil slipped Vert. Escutcheon Per fess Sable and Or a pale counterchanged in chief an ermine spot of the first between two trefoils slipped of the second and in base a like trefoil between two like ermine spots. Supporters Dexter a fox reguardant Proper in the mouth a trefoil slipped Vert, sinister a lion Gules ducally crowned Or. Motto Serviendo; Nec Temere Nec Timide

Sir Richard Godin Simeon, 2nd Baronet (21 May 1784 – 4 January 1854) was an English Liberal Party politician.

Simeon was born in 1784, the son of Sir John Simeon, 1st Baronet and Rebecca Cornwall.

Simeon was elected at the 1832 general election as the Member of Parliament (MP) for the Isle of Wight, a new constituency which had been created by the Reform Act 1832. He was re-elected in 1835, and stood down from the House of Commons at the 1837 general election.

He was appointed as a Deputy Lieutenant of the Isle of Wight 1831, and in 1846. He also served as High Sheriff of Hampshire for 1845. Charles and John Simeon were his sons.

Parliament of the United Kingdom
New constituency	Member of Parliament for Isle of Wight; 1832 – 1837	Succeeded by William à Court-Holmes
Baronetage of the United Kingdom
Preceded by John Simeon	Baronet of Grazeley, Berkshire; 1824 – 1854	Succeeded by John Simeon
