= Stephen Ross, Baron Ross of Newport =

British politician (1926–1993)

Stephen Sherlock Ross, Baron Ross of Newport (6 July 1926 – 10 May 1993) often known as Steve Ross was a Liberal politician in the United Kingdom.

Ross came from a Scottish background, his family being in shipping in Liverpool. His mother died when he was a baby and he was brought up by his father, who held the MC, in London.

Educated at Bedford School, he went into the Royal Navy aged 18 in 1944 and served four years on the lower decks, which he claimed was the best thing that ever happened to him. In 1948 he joined his uncle's firm in Kidderminster, which was an auction and cattle market. He qualified as a chartered surveyor and land agent. He went to the Isle of Wight in 1953 to secure a better job, and in 1958 tried to join the Liberal Party but 'no one wanted to know'. He finally joined in 1961 and in the 1964 election worked for an elderly lady candidate 'who was slightly muddled about who was Prime Minister'. He decided things could not go on like that and fought the 1966 election himself with his wife, Brenda, and a few friends, covering the island by Land Rover. He did the same in 1970, by which time he had become a county councillor. Ross was Leader of Isle of Wight County Council 1973-74 and 1981–83.

He was elected as member of parliament for the Isle of Wight at the February 1974 general election; this was the one surprising Liberal win at this election, outside areas where the Liberals had been traditionally strong. He was re-elected in October 1974, 1979 and 1983 until his retirement from the House of Commons in 1987. In the Commons he was successively party spokesman on housing and local government, the environment, transport and Northern Ireland, but his main legislative imprint remains to this day in the Housing (Homeless Persons) Act of 1977 which he promoted successfully as a Private Member's Bill.

Shortly after he chose to not stand for a fourth term, he was elevated to the House of Lords, being created a life peer on 4 November 1987 taking the title Baron Ross of Newport, of Newport in the County of the Isle of Wight, where he spoke on local government

As an MP in his constituency he enjoyed a popular following, and reports that he received support from others who would normally have voted for candidates from other parties were often cited. On his departure from the Commons, the Conservative candidate Barry Field was elected and held onto the seat for two terms until 1997 when the seat was temporarily regained for one term by the successors to the Liberals, the Liberal Democrats.

Parliament of the United Kingdom
Preceded by Mark Woodnutt	Member of Parliament for the Isle of Wight; Feb. 1974–1987	Succeeded by Barry Field
