= Peter Macdonald (Conservative politician) =

British politician

Sir Peter Macdonald KBE
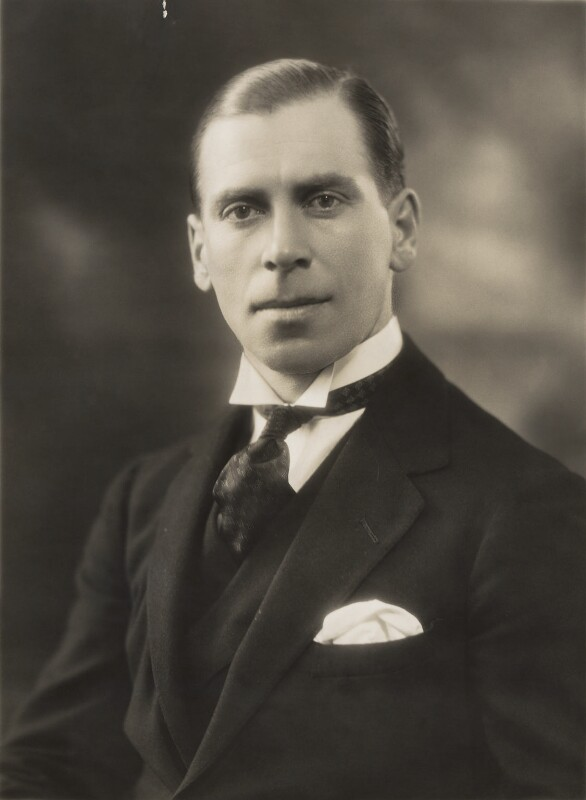

Member of Parliament for Isle of Wight
- In office 29 October 1924 – 18 September 1959
- Preceded by: J. E. B. Seely, 1st Baron Mottistone
- Succeeded by: Mark Woodnutt

Personal details
- Born: 1 February 1894 Gillis Lake, Nova Scotia, Canada
- Died: 2 December 1961 (aged 67) Ningwood Manor, Yarmouth, Isle of Wight, England
- Party: Conservative
- Education: Dalhousie College; Trinity Hall, Cambridge
- Profession: UK Member of Parliament

Sir Peter Drummond Macdonald KBE (1 February 1894 – 2 December 1961) was a Canadian-born Conservative Party politician in the United Kingdom. He was Member of Parliament (MP) for the Isle of Wight from 1924 to 1959.

== Early life ==
One of nine children born to Mary and Ronald A MacDonald, Peter Drummond was born in Gillis Lake, Nova Scotia and attended Dalhousie College in Halifax.

When World War I began, MacDonald left his studies and joined the Canadian Overseas Expeditionary Force, 1 November 1915. He sailed aboard Metagama from St. John, New Brunswick on 1 January 1916 and arrived in Plymouth, England on 10 January 1916. He was promoted to Staff Sergeant on 1 February 1916 at Sandgate, Kent. His army registration number as a member of the Canadian Expeditionary Force was 522023. He was listed as a S. Sergeant, occupation, accountant with CAPC, 6th Division, 63 battalion. Peter MacDonald was attached to the Royal Canadian Regiment (RCR) 27 August 1916 for rations and Instructions. He ceased to be attached to the RCR 9 October 1916, upon his evacuation to England injured.

He was attached to No. 3, Canadian General Hospital in Boulogne, France after he came under intense shelling 8 October 1916 as a member of the 57th battalion. He was aided from the shelling with assistance walking but a right arm injury and contused back saw him returned to Norfolk War Hospital, Thorpe, Norwich, England. He was discharged from Convalescence Hospital, Woodcote Park, Epsom 27 November 1916. He remained with CAPC until 2 November 1917 when he received a Lieutenant's commission to the Army Service Corps, ASC, Camp Aldershot.

After training as an officer and a temporary gentleman he served in the Army Pay Department (APD) until he was discharged from the army 13 March 1918 to pursue his legal education at Trinity Hall, Cambridge. During the First World War he served in France, reaching the rank of Staff Sergeant. On 22 February 1918 he received a Commission to the Imperial Army.

== Political career ==
At the 1923 general election he was chosen by the Conservatives to contest the Isle of Wight constituency as a Unionist candidate, and narrowly failed to unseat the sitting Liberal MP, J. E. B. Seely. Seely held the seat with a majority of 90 votes in a three-way contest, with the Labour Party candidate coming a distant third. When a further general election was called in 1924, MacDonald faced Seely and Labour candidate Weaver. MacDonald received 52% of the vote as a Unionist candidate.

A marked swing to the Conservatives secured the large majority for MacDonald as he was elected to the House of Commons. He was parliamentary private secretary to Sir Philip Cunliffe-Lister, President of the Board of Trade from 1928-1929.

During the Second World War, MacDonald saw service in 242 Squadron as Flight Officer and as Adjutant to Douglas Bader during the Battle of Britain. On 24 June 1940 Bader was promoted to squadron leader and given command of No. 242 Squadron at RAF Coltishall. After the Battle of Britain MacDonald, as MP, found himself embroiled in the "Big Wing" controversy. Bader and Leigh-Mallory were proponents while, Dowding and Park were not. Dowding and Park were the commanders overseeing the British victory in the Battle of Britain. It seemed a conspiracy engineered the downfall of Air Chief-Marshal Sir Hugh Dowding, head of Fighter Command, and Air Vice-Marshal Sir Keith Park, commander of 11 Group. Park was responsible for Battle of Britain command decisions from Operations Command at Uxbridge. MacDonald left 242 Squadron to accept a transfer to the Royal Air Force Volunteer Reserve, reaching the rank of squadron leader.

MacDonald held a number of positions within the parliamentary Conservative Party including holding the chair of the Imperial Affairs Committee for more than 20 years. He also took part in a number of inter-parliamentary bodies, and was vice-chairman of the Inter-Parliamentary Union (British Group) in 1945–1947. He was created a Knight Commander of the Order of the British Empire in the Dissolution Honours of 1945.

MacDonald retired from Parliament at the 1959 general election.

== Death ==
He died following a riding accident near his home, Ningwood Manor, Yarmouth, Isle of Wight on 2 December 1961. He was cremated. His ashes were interred in Shalfleet Churchyard, Shalfleet, Isle of Wight 9 Dec 1961.(4)

== Personal life ==
He was twice married. His first wife was Jean Alice Elaine Cochrane, Lady Jean Hervey, daughter of the 12th Earl of Dundonald and Winifred, Countess of Dundonald. Lady Jean was previously married to Lord Herbert Hervey, with whom she had a son, Victor Hervey, 6th Marquess of Bristol. His godmother was the Spanish Queen Victoria Eugenie of Battenberg. The marriage broke down after she learned of Lord Hervey's affair. The following year, in December 1933, Lady Jean Cochrane remarried at a London register office to Member of Parliament, Captain Peter Macdonald.

Upon Lady Jean's death in January 1955, Macdonald began a relationship with Dr. Phoebe Harvey, Consultant Anaesthetist, of Shanklin. They married in May 1956.

Parliament of the United Kingdom
Preceded by J. E. B. Seely	Member of Parliament for Isle of Wight; 1924–1959	Succeeded by Mark Woodnutt
