= Mark Woodnutt =

Member of Parliament for Isle of Wight
- In office 8 October 1959 – 8 February 1974
- Preceded by: Peter Macdonald
- Succeeded by: Stephen Ross

Personal details
- Born: Harold Frederick Martin Woodnutt; 23 November 1918
- Died: 6 November 1974 (aged 55)
- Party: Conservative

Harold Frederick Martin Woodnutt (23 November 1918 – 6 November 1974), known as Mark Woodnutt, was a British Conservative Party politician, chartered secretary and company director of Woodnutts - a boat-building firm at Bembridge on the Isle of Wight.

Son of Harold Frederick Woodnutt, he was educated at Isleworth Grammar School. His younger brother was the actor John Woodnutt. Woodnutt became involved in local politics on the island when he was elected to the Isle of Wight County Council to represent Bembridge. He later became a county alderman. He was selected by the Conservatives as their parliamentary candidate when the sitting Member of Parliament (MP) for the Isle of Wight, Sir Peter Macdonald, stood down at the 1959 general election. Woodnutt held the seat for the party, retaining it at the 1964, 1966 and 1970 elections.

At the February 1974 election he lost the seat by 7,766 votes to the Liberal candidate Stephen Ross despite having won a huge 17,326 majority over Labour in 1970. This defeat was attributed to his involvement in a financial scandal involving Bembridge Harbour. With the closure of the railway in 1961, British Rail were left in possession of much of the land at Bembridge Harbour. This was offered to the county council who chose not to purchase it. It was instead sold to a syndicate headed by Major Charles Selwyn, proprietor of the Royal Spithead Hotel on the harbour, and then chairman of the county council. The syndicate established two separate development companies of which Woodnutt became a director. The companies subsequently purchased more land in the area from the county council at below market values. It became clear that the companies intended carrying out very large residential developments to offset the costs of dredging the harbour and reclaiming land.

There was great unease among the island's residents about the scale of the proposed developments, and it was said that public lands had been sold without proper tenders. It was felt that Woodnutt's position as an M.P. had given him privileged access, and consequent control of the harbour. After this event prominent graffiti sites referring to Woodnutt and his business partner in unflattering terms began to appear around the local area - notably on St Helens Fort.

Woodnutt's Liberal opponent, Stephen Ross, was a member of the county council. Ross had resigned from his job with a local firm of estate agents when elected to the council in order to avoid conflict of interest. He headed a committee of the council which rejected the suggestion that the council buy out the shareholders in the development companies.

Apart from the Bembridge controversy, Woodnutt put his defeat down to his piloting through parliament of the Isle of Wight County Council Act 1971. The Act required organisers of any event at which more than 5,000 people were expected to attend to apply to the county council at least four months in advance for permission. Woodnutt had introduced the legislation to prevent a recurrence of the Isle of Wight Festivals of 1969 and 1970, which had attracted hundreds of thousands of visitors. Woodnutt conceded that he had probably lost the support of votes below the age of 30, and that the Labour Party had effectively entered a pact with the Liberals to ensure his defeat.

Woodnutt did not stand for re-election when another election was held in October 1974, and he died in November of that year at the age of 55. He had married, in 1945, Gwynneth, daughter of William B. Lovely. Their son, Martin, married Susannah, daughter of William Herbert Harrison, J.P. by his wife Elcha Cecilia Hore-Ruthven, of the family of the Lords Ruthven of Freeland.

Parliament of the United Kingdom
| Preceded by Sir Peter Macdonald | Member of Parliament for the Isle of Wight; 1959–Feb. 1974 | Succeeded by Stephen Ross |
