= Barry Field =

British Conservative Party politician

Barry John Anthony Field (born 4 July 1946) is a British former Conservative politician. He was elected Member of Parliament for the Isle of Wight at the 1987 general election, gaining the seat from the Liberal Party. He remained the Member of Parliament for the Isle of Wight until the 1997 general election, where he stood down after 10 years as a Member of Parliament.

Parliament of the United Kingdom
Preceded by Stephen Ross	Member of Parliament for the Isle of Wight; 1987–1997	Succeeded by Peter Brand
