= Peter Brand (British politician) =

British Liberal Democrat politician (1947–2023)

Member of Parliament for Isle of Wight
- In office 1 May 1997 – 14 May 2001
- Preceded by: Barry Field
- Succeeded by: Andrew Turner

Personal details
- Born: 16 May 1947
- Died: 22 September 2023 (aged 76) East Cowes, Isle of Wight, England
- Party: Liberal Democrats
- Education: University of Birmingham Medical School
- Occupation: General practitioner; politician

Peter Brand (16 May 1947 – 22 September 2023) was a British general practitioner and Liberal Democrat politician.

== Early life ==
Peter Brand was born on 16 May 1947. He studied at Thornbury Grammar School and the University of Birmingham Medical School.

== Political career ==
Brand was elected to the Isle of Wight Council in 1984.

Brand was elected member of parliament for the Isle of Wight at the 1997 general election after coming second in 1992, but lost his seat to the Conservatives at the 2001 election. During his time in parliament his voting record shows he often rebelled against the majority vote of his party.

== Personal life and death ==
Brand practised as a GP in Brading and Lake for many years but was retired. In 2000, he was investigated by the police over the death of a child patient in 1973, but was cleared of wrongdoing. He lived with his wife, Jane, who was also a GP.

Peter Brand died at his home in East Cowes on 22 September 2023, at the age of 76.

Parliament of the United Kingdom
| Preceded by Barry Field | Member of Parliament for the Isle of Wight; 1997–2001 | Succeeded by Andrew Turner |
