= Edward Dawes =

Edward Dawes (1805 – 27 January 1856) was an English Radical politician who served for one year as the Member of Parliament (MP) for the Isle of Wight. Born into modest circumstances on the island, he was provided for by his aunt Sophie Dawes, Baronne de Feuchères, who was the mistress of Duke of Bourbon.

He was elected at a by-election in May 1851, after the sitting Whig member John Simeon had resigned his seat. The election was extremely unruly, with a violent mob causing damage and the death of one voter from a heart attack. The Times reported "The constituency of the isle has been in a perfect ferment during the whole of the election and broken panes and broken heads have been among the results". Dawes (running on a policy of free trade) defeated his Conservative challenger Captain Hammond (who advocated protectionism) by 46 votes.

However, at the general election in July 1852 Dawes was defeated by the Conservative Party candidate, Francis Venables-Vernon-Harcourt, who secured a majority of 101 votes. Dawes did not stand for Parliament again, but devoted himself to the study of agricultural chemistry. He was the author of a number of tracts on the subject.

Dawes suffered from heart disease, and died while on a visit to the health resort of Sidmouth, Devon in January 1856. He was buried in the family vault at St Helens, Isle of Wight.

Parliament of the United Kingdom
Preceded by John Simeon	Member of Parliament for Isle of Wight; 1851 – 1852	Succeeded by Francis Venables-Vernon-Harcourt
