= Margaret Bernadine Hall =

English painter (1863–1910)

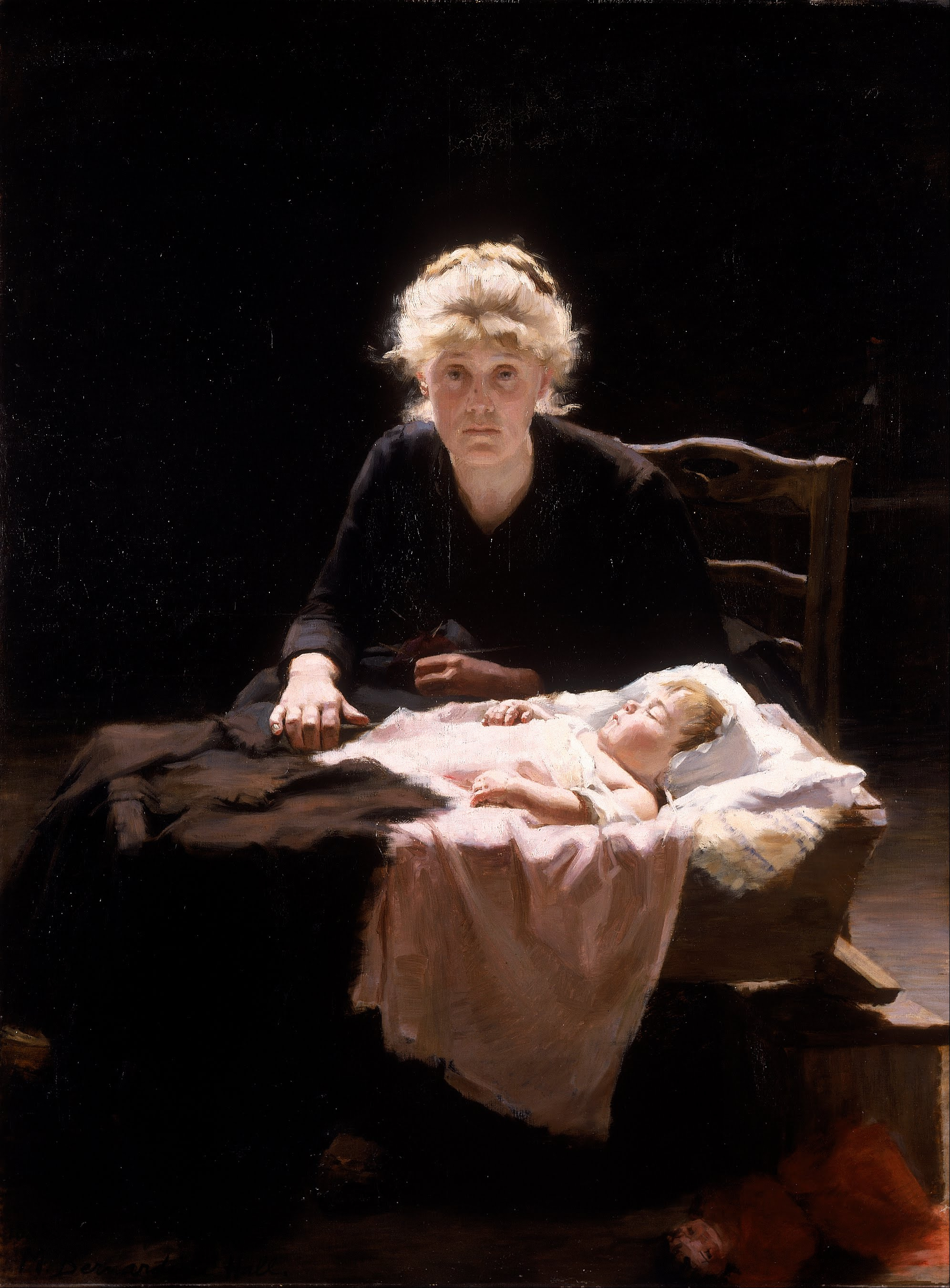
Fantine (1886) by Margaret Bernadine Hall

Margaret Bernadine Hall (10 March 1863 – 2 January 1910) was an English painter who spent most of her career in Paris. Few of her works have survived, but she is notable for her 1886 painting Fantine, which hangs in the Walker Art Gallery, Liverpool, England. The subject of the painting is Fantine, a character in Victor Hugo's 1862 novel Les Misérables.

== Biography ==
Margaret Bernadine Hall was born in 1863 in Wavertree, Liverpool. Her father was Bernard Hall (1813–1890), a merchant, local politician and philanthropist, who was elected Mayor of Liverpool in 1879. Her mother was Margaret Calrow (1827–1902) from Preston, who was Bernard Hall's second wife. Margaret was their second child, and their oldest daughter. In 1882 the family moved to London, and later that year, at the age of 19, Margaret moved to Paris to study for five years at the academy run by Auguste Feyen-Perrin and Eduard Krug. This was at a time when there were few female artists in the city, and when the Impressionists were active. Between 1888 and 1894 Hall travelled extensively to countries including Japan, China, Australia, North America, and North Africa, returning to Paris in 1894. She moved back to England in 1907, where she died three years later at the home of the playwright George Calderon in Hampstead Heath, London. Following her death, her estate was valued at £22,130 (equivalent to £2,850,000 in 2023). She was interred in the churchyard of All Saints' Church, Childwall, Liverpool, and there is a brass memorial tablet to her in the north aisle of the church. In 1925 a retrospective exhibition of her paintings was held in Chelsea, London.

== Works ==
Most of Hall's paintings have disappeared. In addition to Fantine, it is known that she painted Les Abandonées, and Le Pauvre Père, all of which were studies in social realism. In 1885 Les Abandonées was exhibited in the Paris Salon. Fantine was painted in the following year, the year after Victor Hugo died, and it received an honourable mention from the Société des Femmes Peintres. In 1887 Hall's paintings were shown at exhibitions in Vienna, Chicago, London and Manchester. What happened to most of the paintings after Hall's death is not known.

In 1910, her brother Sir Douglas Hall offered Fantine and Les Abandonées to the National Gallery, London, but they were declined. During the following year he offered them to the Walker Art Gallery, and Fantine was accepted.

There are two other known extant paintings by Hall. In Trinity College, Cambridge is a portrait entitled Sedley Taylor (1834–1920), Music Scholar and Benefactor, which was painted in 1898. The other painting came to light in 2011; it is in private ownership, and is a portrait of her brother, Sir Douglas Bernard Hall, with an estimated date of 1884. The only other known surviving works from the hand of Margaret Hall are five copies she made of paintings by Murillo, Raphael, Veronese, and Ribalta, commissioned by the Sisters of the Chapel of the Transfiguration in Cincinnati, Ohio, United States.
