= Andrew Turner (politician) =

British politician (born 1953)

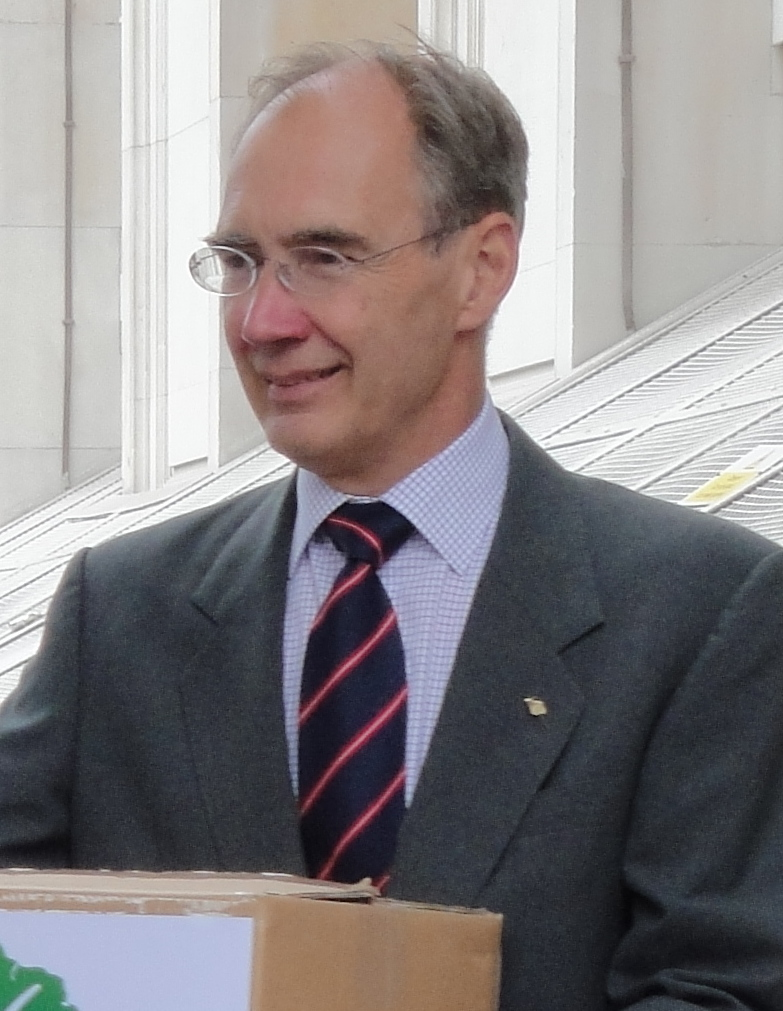

Member of Parliament for Isle of Wight
- In office 7 June 2001 – 3 May 2017
- Preceded by: Peter Brand
- Succeeded by: Bob Seely

Personal details
- Born: 24 October 1953 (age 72) Coventry, Warwickshire, England
- Party: Conservative
- Education: Keble College, Oxford

Andrew John Turner (born 24 October 1953) is a British politician who served as the Member of Parliament (MP) for the Isle of Wight from 2001 to 2017. A member of the Conservative Party, he served as its vice-chairman from 2003 until 2005.

Born in Coventry, Turner was educated at Rugby School and Keble College, Oxford. He stood unsuccessfully as the Conservative candidate for both the Hackney South and Shoreditch constituency in the 1992 general election and for the Birmingham East constituency in the 1994 European Parliamentary election.

Turner was elected MP for the Isle of Wight in the 2001 general election. He attracted press attention and criticism during the parliamentary expenses scandal of 2009. He was re-elected in the 2010 election, after which he led the One Wight campaign against government plans to dismantle his constituency. Turner announced that he would stand down at the 2017 election following reports that he had told a group of schoolchildren he thought homosexuality was "wrong" and "dangerous to society".

== Early life and career ==
Born in Coventry, Turner was educated at Rugby School, an independent school for boys in the market town of Rugby in Warwickshire, followed by Keble College at the University of Oxford, receiving an MA in Geography. He later studied to be a teacher at the University of Birmingham and Henley Management College.

Turner taught geography in comprehensive schools. Turner was an education advisor to the previous Conservative government and founded the Grant Maintained Schools Foundation which he ran from 1988 to 1997. He was a councillor on Oxford City Council for several years. In 2000, he worked for the Labour-controlled London Borough of Southwark on outsourcing their education provision following a negative report from Ofsted.

Prior to becoming a member of parliament, Turner contested other elections for the Conservative Party. In 1992 Turner stood in the Hackney South and Shoreditch constituency, however fell short of a majority by 9,016 to Labour candidate Brian Sedgemore. In 1994 he stood in the European elections for Birmingham East, coming second again to Labour. At the 1997 election, Turner was the Conservative candidate on the Isle of Wight, coming second to Liberal Democrat MP Peter Brand.

== Parliamentary career ==
Turner ousted Peter Brand at the 2001 general election, with a swing of 5.7% for the Conservatives and 2,826 more votes than the Liberal Democrats. It was one of the few gains for the Conservative Party at the election.

After his election to parliament, Turner was selected to serve as executive of the 1922 Committee of the Conservative Party and as a member of the Education and Skills Select Committee. He also acted as vice-chairman of the Conservative Party from 2003 to 2005. In 2005, he extended his majority to 12,978 (48.9% of the vote).

Later in the year, he was moved to the Conservative frontbench, being given the role of Shadow Minister for Charities, replacing Jacqui Lait, until 2006, when he was replaced by Greg Clark. During his time on the Conservative frontbench, he was the party's spokesman on the Charities Bill. From 5 February 2008, he was on the Justice Committee.

In the 2010 general election, Turner was re-elected as MP for the Isle of Wight with a majority of 10,527 from a total of 32,810 votes, 2.3% less than in the previous election, but still a comfortable win with a 46.7% vote share. Turner has broken the Conservative Party whip on rare occasions.

In 2011, Turner declared his support for capital punishment.

=== Expenses claims ===
Following the MPs expenses scandal of 2009, Andrew Turner announced that all his expenses would be published online. His constituency home in Newport was registered in 2009 as his second home. It was reported in May 2009 that in 2008 he had claimed £137,641, putting him in 438th place of 645 MPs. £108,842 of which was used to run his Newport-based office which employs four full-time staff including his partner and parliamentary assistant, Carole Dennett.

In June 2009 his expenses were revealed by The Daily Telegraph, showing £6 spent on wrapping paper on Christmas Eve, four "life coaching" sessions costing £160, £240 for a member of staff to study GCSE maths, and £20 on cufflinks. In 2005 and 2006, Turner made claims for £199 and £139 for a pair of digital radios. A further claim of £10 was made for a vase for his office after a well-wisher sent him flowers following his stroke (see below). In 2004 an employment tribunal ordered Turner to pay back compensation to Colin Hedgley, a former office manager who was found to have been unfairly dismissed. Of the £10,250 in ordered compensation, Turner "claimed £6,471 from parliamentary allowances and paid the rest from personal funds". He later defended the claims as fully related to his MP work, with the exception of the wrapping paper.

Further concern was expressed over a 2005 email his partner sent to the fees office regarding bank account details, which stated "Look forward to receiving the money – I shall then be able to spend it on lots of booze so that the forthcoming election goes in an alcoholic blur". Turner later stated that, although the e-mail "could be judged as inappropriate", it was merely "a private joke between two people in regular contact". The Legg Report showed that 343 MPs had been asked to repay some money, including Turner whose £681.60 was the 250th highest on the list. The final report called for MPs to be disallowed from employing family members; it was reported that this might affect Turner's parliamentary assistant and partner.

In 2010–11, Turner claimed £119,315 of expenses, higher than any other MP in neighbouring Hampshire and 197th overall which included over £16,000 for accommodation, £4,800 for travel and £97,864.47 for an office and staff. Turner pointed out he had the largest number of constituents in the UK, and the claims included one-off expenditure for an office move to the Riverside Centre.

=== One Wight ===
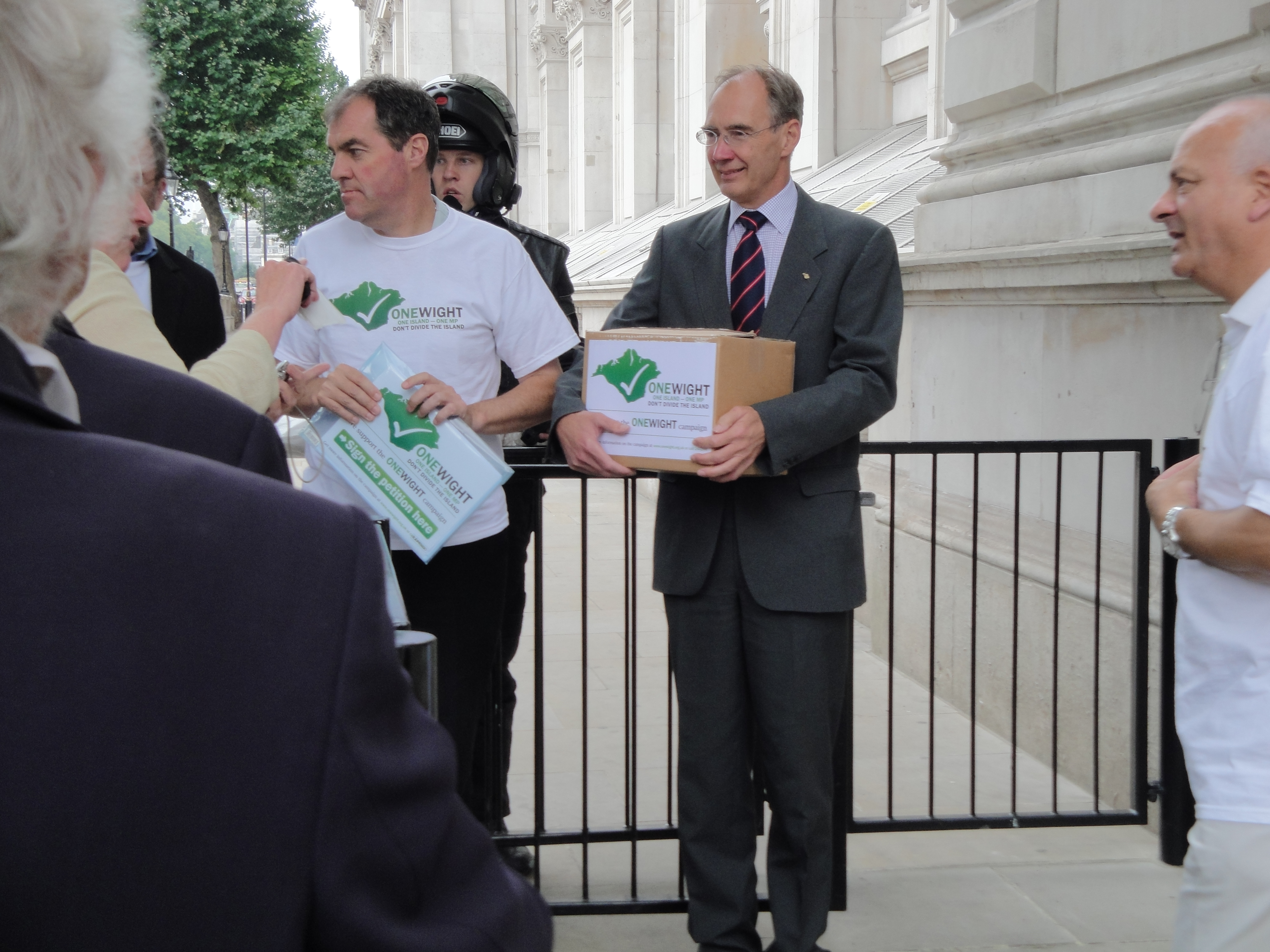
Andrew Turner (centre-right) outside Downing Street delivering the One Wight petition

In July 2010, Deputy Prime Minister Nick Clegg announced plans to normalise the size of constituencies to around 77,000 with plans for part of the island to be represented by a mainland MP, something which has not happened since 1832. Two exceptions to the boundary changes had been made to Scottish islands but it was felt that as the Isle of Wight was geographically closer to the mainland, such an exception would not be necessary. The One Wight campaign, led by Turner launched with a petition on 23 July 2010 and within the first week over 1,500 people had signed, which had increased to 5,000 by the middle of August. The target of 10,000 signatures was reached over the Garlic Festival weekend in August with the final figure of 17,529 before the petition reached Downing Street.

On 6 September 2010, the OneWight petition was taken to Downing Street with Turner and several other island representatives including Labour representative Mark Chiverton and Liberal Democrat representative Jill Wareham who both stood as candidates in the 2010 general election. The goal of OneWight was to have one MP for the Isle of Wight. Turner did originally succeed in this objective, although the 2023 Periodic Review of Westminster constituencies proposed the division of the island into Isle of Wight East and Isle of Wight West, electing two MPs.

=== 2015 re-election campaign ===
In April 2015, it was reported that Turner's election agent, David Walter, had resigned just over a week before polling day in the 2015 general election. Walter was quoted as writing in his letter of resignation that his situation was "untenable" because Turner's ex-fiancée, Carole Dennett, was exercising "dominance and control of all aspects [making it] impossible for me to do my job". Walter's resignation letter also cited "significant anomalies and ambiguities" in campaign finances and the “disastrous situation” caused by the failure to meet the Royal Mail’s deadline for the free distribution of election material, due to the incompetence of Turner and Dennett. Walter concluded his letter by saying:

"Your failure to provide any leadership to your campaign – or demonstrate an ability to make decisions yourself – has led to this wholly regrettable situation. It does, of course, raise serious questions about your basic competency to continue as Member of Parliament for the Isle of Wight".

On 28 April 2015, Turner turned down a request to appear on the BBC’s South Today programme about the general election. However, Turner’s former election agent, David Walter, did take part, saying:

"Rather than sitting down with me face to face to try to overcome these problems, Andrew just disappeared and wouldn’t speak to me so I’ve really had to do this. It is sad, but I’ve come to the conclusion that really Andrew is not the man for the Isle of Wight".

The presenter read out a statement from Turner in his absence about Walter’s claims, which said, "His views aren’t shared by anybody else in [my] team".

=== Controversial comments and retirement ===
On 28 April 2017, Turner spoke to a group of school children at an event to engage young people in politics, and it was reported that he said that being gay "isn't normal", is "wrong" and a "danger to society". Labour's election campaign chair, the MP Andrew Gwynne, said "there is no place for bigotry and hatred like this in modern society" and anyone "holding these views is" not "fit for public office". Turner voted against LGBT rights issues during his 16 years in parliament. Following the incident, Turner announced that he would not contest the seat at the 2017 general election.

== Personal life ==
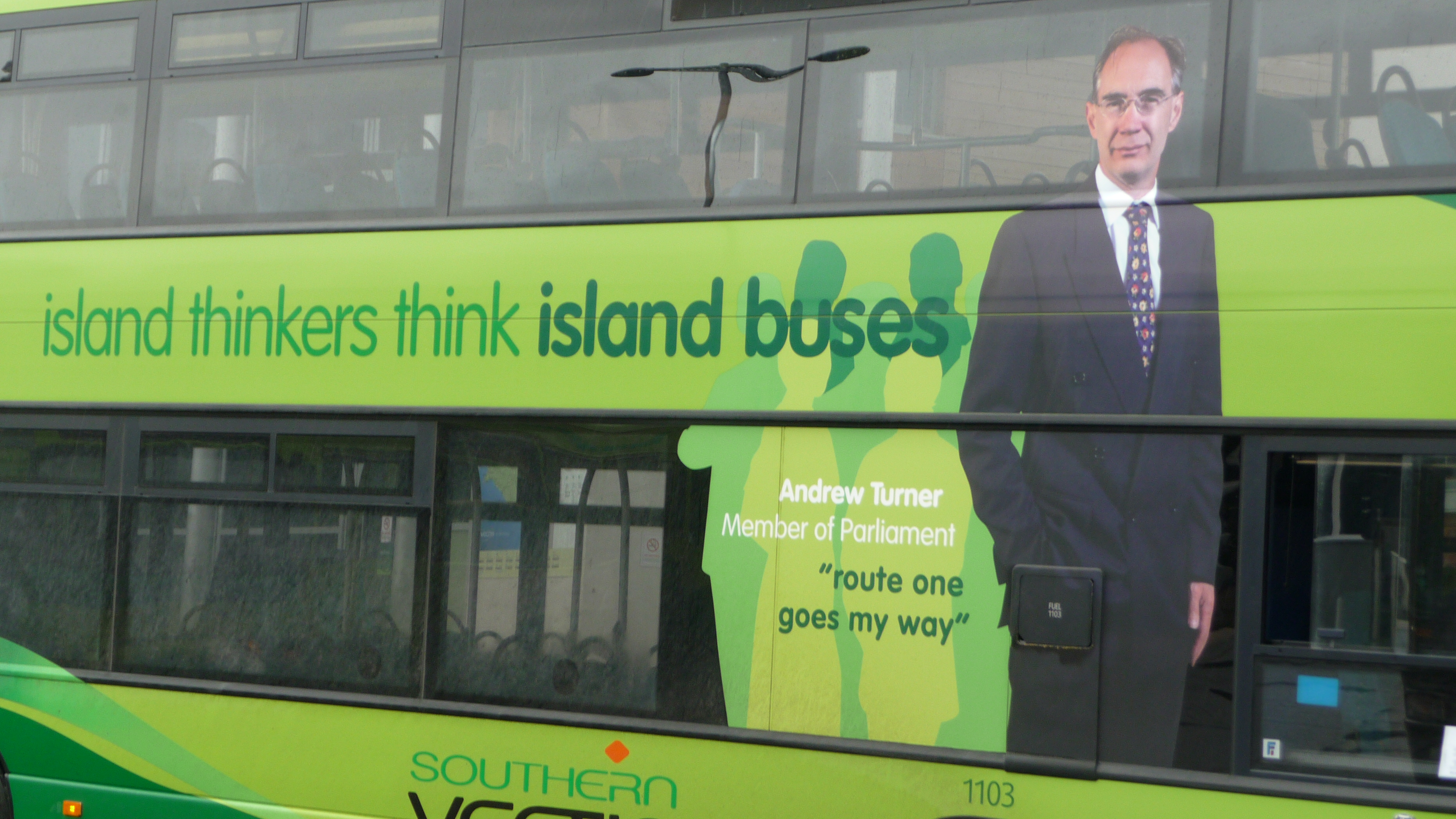
Turner on the side of a Southern Vectis bus

On 14 August 2006, Turner was attending the Isle of Wight County Show with his Jack Russell Terrier, when he lost hold of the lead. The dog escaped and attacked a four-year-old ferret who had to be put down. Turner later apologised to the ferret's owner.

On 10 December 2006, it was reported that Turner had suffered a "serious stroke". In late April 2007, a message on Turner's website thanked friends and political opponents for their support and reported that he was recuperating, having since attended events around the island, and was expected to make a full recovery.

On 12 February 2010, Turner's then partner Carole Dennett was involved in a verbal altercation with Isle of Wight Council leader Cllr David Pugh, in an incident which occurred outside a Charity Valentine's Ball at Cowes Yacht Haven. Pugh, who swore at Dennett during the exchange, later apologised for his conduct.

On 10 December 2014, it was announced that Turner had split from Dennett, having lived with her in Newport until December 2014. In January 2015, four former party chairmen called for Turner to be replaced as 2015 General Election candidate after Dennett moved in with his parliamentary aide and made him "the laughing stock of the island."

== See also ==
- Politics of the Isle of Wight

Parliament of the United Kingdom
Preceded by Peter Brand	Member of Parliament for the Isle of Wight; 2001–2017	Succeeded by Bob Seely
