= Emily Palmer =

Emily Palmer (died 14 July 1928) was a British politician.

Palmer was active in the co-operative and labour movements in Southampton. She served as vice-chair of the Southampton Labour Representation Committee, and then as president of the Southampton Trades and Labour Council. She was the first woman elected to Southampton Borough Council, and was also a magistrate in the city.

At the 1923 United Kingdom general election, Palmer contested the Isle of Wight for the Labour Party, but took third place, with only 7.1% of the vote.

In the late 1920s, Palmer began suffering from poor health, and in 1928, she committed suicide. She was found at her Portswood home with her throat cut and a razor next to her.
