= Fantine (painting) =

Painting by Margaret Bernadine Hall

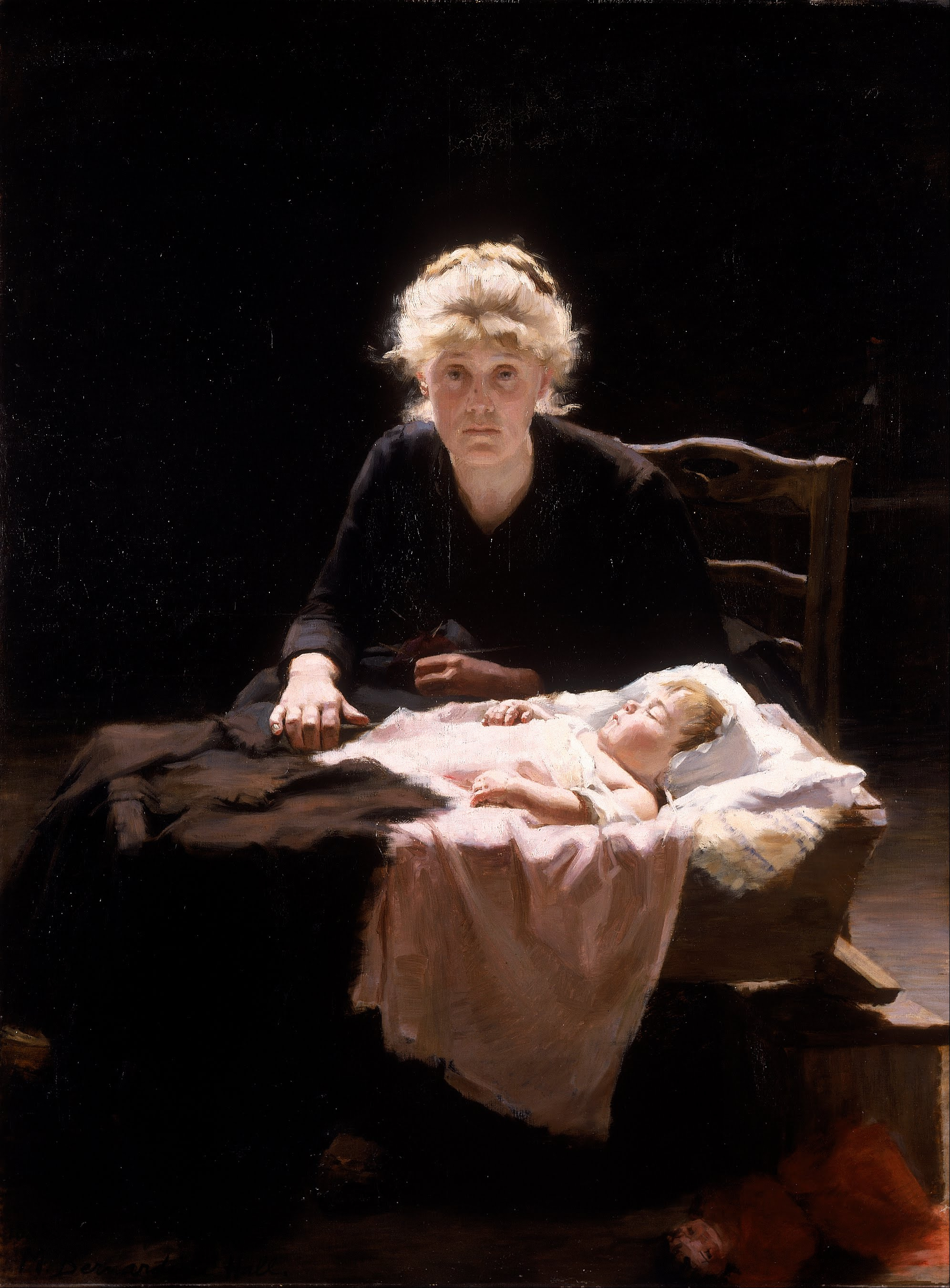
Fantine, by Margaret Bernadine Hall, 1886

Fantine is a painting by Margaret Bernadine Hall (1863–1910) hanging in the Walker Art Gallery, Liverpool, England. It is executed in oil on canvas, and measures 157 cm by 116.2 cm.

== History ==
The subject of the painting is Fantine, a character in Victor Hugo's 1862 novel Les Misérables. It was painted in Paris in 1886, the year following Victor Hugo's death, and received an honourable mention from the Société des Femmes Peintres. The following year some of Hall's paintings were shown at exhibitions in Vienna, Chicago, London and Manchester, and it is likely that Fantine was among them. After Hall's death in 1910, her brother Sir Douglas Bernard Hall offered the painting to the National Gallery, London, but it was declined. During the following year he offered it to the Walker Art Gallery, where it was accepted. In 1988 the painting was restored in the Harriet Owen Hughes Conservation Centre in Bluecoat Chambers, Liverpool, and as of 2012, it hangs at the head of the main staircase of the Walker Art Gallery.

== Description ==
The painting depicts the full-face portrait of a seated woman with strong highlights, in front of a dark background. The woman looks forward with a sad, wistful expression. In front of her is a sleeping baby in a cradle, with a doll in a red dress lying on the floor. In the background, an empty bottle sits on a table. The painting represents an episode in the early chapters of Les Misérables. Fantine, having fallen in love, had been made pregnant, and then abandoned. This occurred in Paris during a period following the French Revolution. The baby was later nicknamed Cosette. The painting demonstrates the sorrow and poverty of an abandoned single mother in post-Revolutionary France.

== See also ==
- Adaptations of Les Misérables
