= Simeon baronets of Chilworth (1677) =

Escutcheon of the Simeon baronets of Chilworth

The Simeon baronetcy, of Chilworth in the County of Oxford, was created in the Baronetage of England on 18 October 1677 for James Simeon. He was the son and heir of George Simeon, a Member of Parliament, but as a Catholic was ineligible to sit in parliament himself. The title became extinct on the death of the 2nd Baronet in 1768.

== Simeon baronets, of Chilworth (1677) ==
- Sir James Simeon, 1st Baronet (died 1709)
- Sir Edward Simeon, 2nd Baronet (c. 1682–1768)
