= Fantine =

Fictional character from Les Misérables

- Les Misérables character
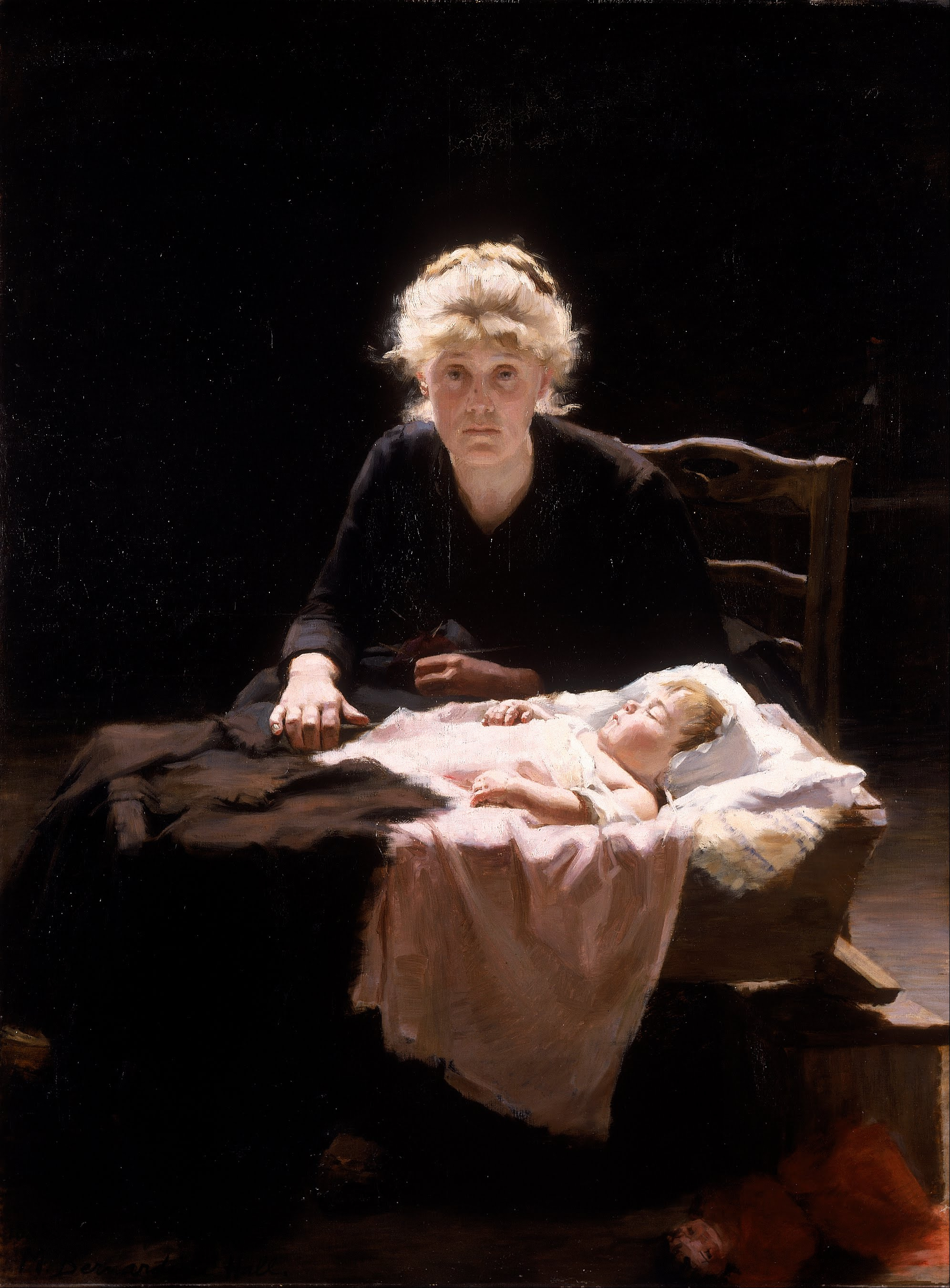
- Fantine by Margaret Hall
- Created by: Victor Hugo

In-universe information
- Gender: Female
- Occupation: Seamstress, factory worker, prostitute
- Significant other: Félix Tholomyès
- Children: Cosette (daughter)
- Relatives: Marius Pontmercy (son-in-law)
- Nationality: French

Fantine (French pronunciation: [fɑ̃tin]) is a fictional character in Victor Hugo's 1862 novel Les Misérables. She is a young grisette in Paris who is impregnated by a rich student. After he abandons her, she is forced to look after their child, Cosette, on her own. Originally a beautiful and naive girl, Fantine is eventually forced by circumstances to become a prostitute to support her daughter, losing her beauty and health until she finally dies of tuberculosis.

She was first played in the musical by Rose Laurens in France, and when the musical came to England, Patti LuPone played Fantine in the West End. Fantine has since been played by numerous actresses.

Fantine became an archetype of self-abnegation and devoted motherhood. She has been portrayed by many actresses in stage and screen versions of the story and has been depicted in works of art.

== In the novel ==
=== Description ===
Hugo introduces Fantine as one of four fair girls attached to young, wealthy students. "She was called Fantine because she had never been known by any other name..." She is described as having, "gold and pearls for her dowry; but the gold was on her head and the pearls in her mouth." Hugo elaborates: "Fantine was fair, without being too conscious of it. She was fair in the two ways—style and rhythm. Style is the form of the ideal, rhythm is its movement."

Her name is said to derive from the Fantines, fairies that appear in Swiss folklore. Their name is derived from French enfantine, lit. 'childlike', which alludes to Fantine's childlike, naive nature.

=== Tholomyès and Cosette ===
Fantine is passionately in love with Félix Tholomyès, one of a quartet of students. One day, the four men invite their four lovers on an outing. They finish the day at a restaurant, only for the women to be abandoned by the men with a goodbye note. While the other three girls take it in good humor and laugh it off, Fantine later feels heartbroken. Tholomyès had fathered their illegitimate daughter Cosette, and Fantine is left to care for her alone.

=== The Thénardiers ===
By the time Cosette is approximately three, Fantine arrives at Montfermeil and meets the Thénardiers who are owners of an inn. She asks them to care for Cosette when she sees their daughters Éponine and Azelma playing outside. They agree to do so as long as she sends them money to provide for her. Fantine's only will to live is keeping Cosette alive. She becomes a worker in Mayor Madeleine's (a.k.a. Jean Valjean's) factory in her hometown of Montreuil-sur-Mer, and has a public letter-writer compose her letters to the Thénardiers for her because she is illiterate. However, she is unaware that the Thénardiers severely abuse Cosette and have forced her to be a slave for their inn. She is also unaware that the letters they send to her requesting financial help for Cosette are their own fraudulent way to extort money from her for themselves.

=== Loss of work ===
Fantine is fired by a meddlesome supervisor, Madame Victurnien, without the knowledge of the mayor, when she finds out that Fantine is an unwed mother. Fantine begins to work at home, earning twelve sous a day while Cosette's lodging costs ten. Her overworking causes her to become sick with a cough and fever. She also rarely goes out, fearing the disgrace she would face from the townspeople.

The Thénardiers then send a letter stating they need ten francs so they can "buy" a woolen skirt for Cosette. To buy the skirt herself, Fantine has her hair cut off and sold. She then says to herself "My child is no longer cold, I have clothed her with my hair." However, she soon begins to despise the mayor for her misfortunes. She later takes on a lover, only for him to beat her and then abandon her. The Thénardiers send another letter saying they need forty francs to buy medicine for Cosette who has become "ill." Desperate for the money, Fantine has her two front teeth removed and sells them.

=== Prostitution ===
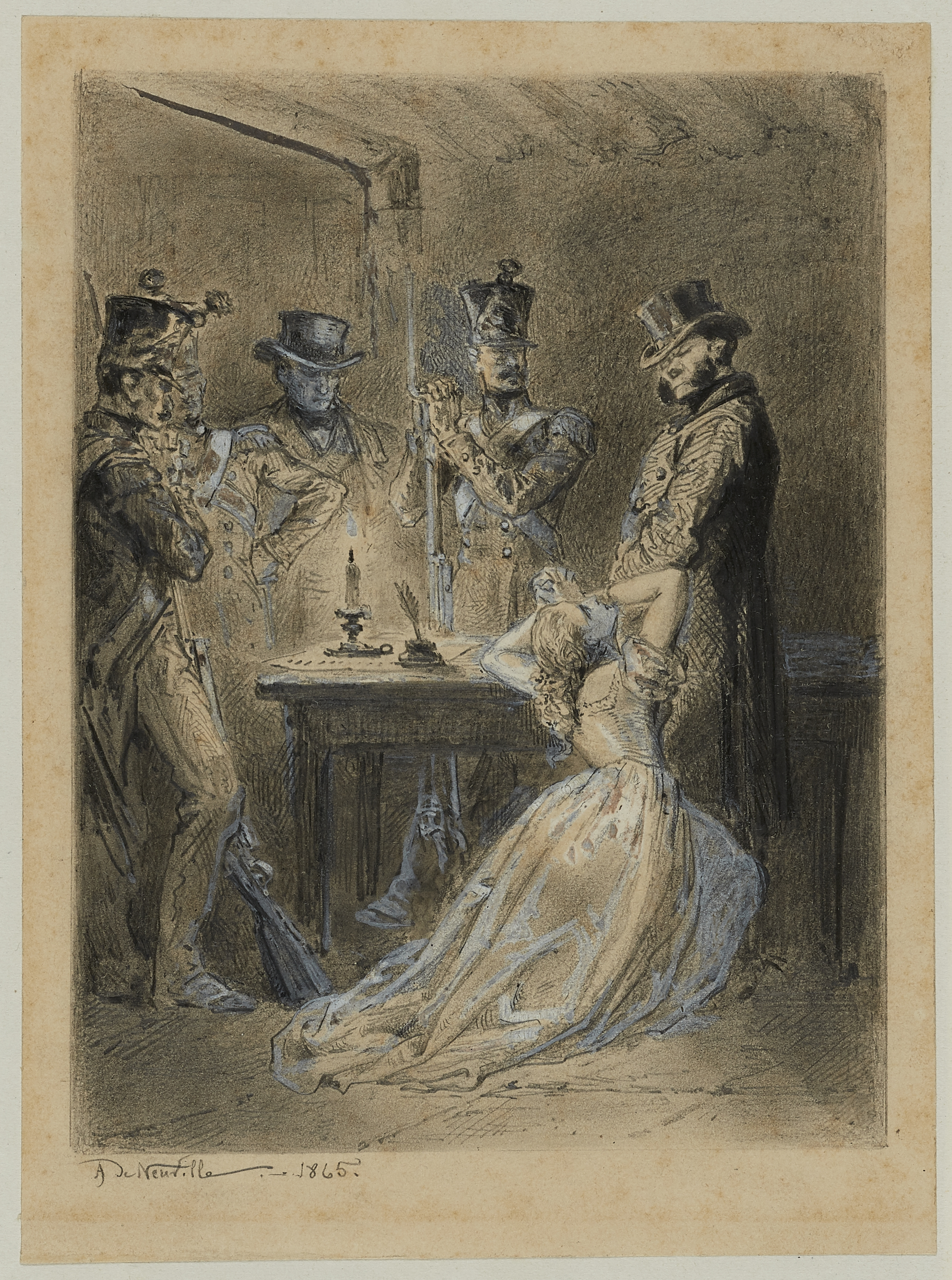
Fantine at Javert's feet

Meanwhile, Fantine's health and her own lodging debts worsen while the Thénardiers' letters continue to grow and their financial demands become more costly. In order to continue to earn money for Cosette, Fantine becomes a prostitute. During a January evening, a dandy called Bamatabois heckles her and shoves snow down the back of her dress when she ignores him. Fantine ferociously attacks him. Javert, the town's police inspector, immediately arrests her while Bamatabois sneaks away. She begs to be let go, but Javert sentences her to six months in prison. Valjean arrives to help Fantine, but upon seeing him she spits in his face. Immediately forgiving Fantine the act, Valjean orders Javert to free Fantine, which he reluctantly does. Valjean tries to help Fantine and Cosette, telling Fantine that he will retrieve Cosette for her. He sends Fantine to the hospital, as she is suffering from tuberculosis.

=== Death ===
After Valjean reveals his true identity at Champmathieu's trial, he goes back to see Fantine at the hospital. She asks about Cosette, and the doctor lies to her saying that Cosette is at the hospital but cannot see Fantine until her health improves. She is appeased by this, and even mistakenly thinks that she hears Cosette laughing and singing. Suddenly, she and Valjean see Javert at the door. Valjean tries to privately ask Javert for three days to obtain Cosette, but he loudly refuses. Fantine realizes that Cosette was never retrieved and frantically asks where she is. Javert impatiently yells at Fantine to be silent, and additionally, tells her Valjean's true identity. Shocked by these revelations, she suffers a severe fit of trembling, falls back on her bed and dies. Valjean then walks to Fantine, whispers to her and kisses her hand. After Valjean is taken into custody, Fantine's body is unceremoniously thrown into a public grave. Later on, after escaping imprisonment, Valjean rescues Cosette and raises her on Fantine's behalf.

== Character ==
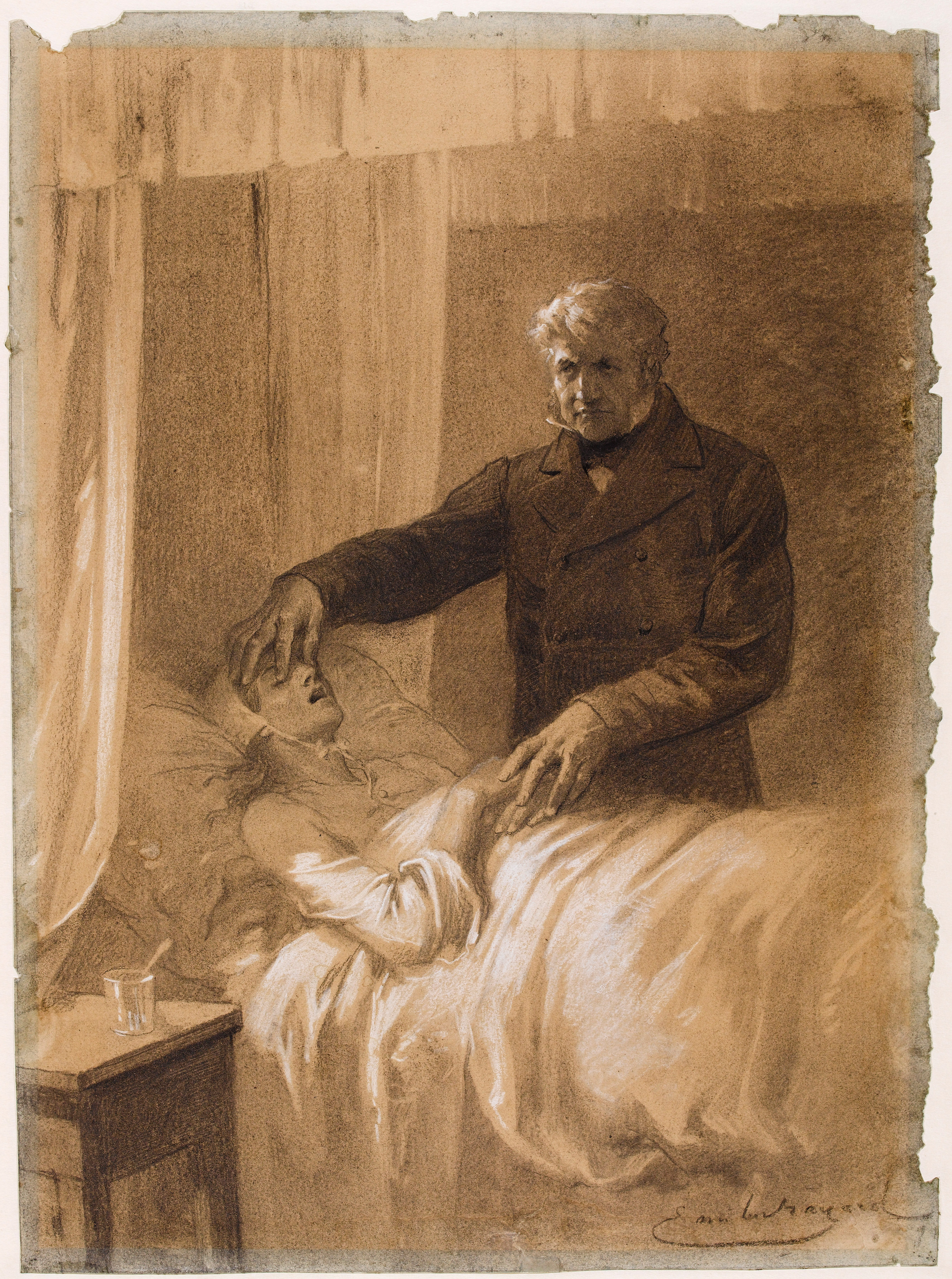
The death of Fantine; Valjean (as Mayor Madeleine) closes her eyes.

Fantine has been interpreted as a holy prostitute figure who becomes a quintessential mother by sacrificing her own body and dignity for the purpose of securing the life of her child. She is an example of what has been called "the cliché of the saved and saintly prostitute that pervades nineteenth-century fiction", which is also found in the writings of Fyodor Dostoyevsky, Leo Tolstoy and Charles Dickens. Oscar Wilde presented her as a figure whose suffering makes her lovable, writing of the scene after she has her teeth removed, that "We run to kiss the bleeding mouth of Fantine". Kathryn M. Grossman says she moves into a form of "maternal sainthood" and that "When Madeleine (Valjean's pseudonym as mayor) affirms that she has remained virtuous and holy before God, Fantine can finally release her hatred and love others again. Or rather, it is because he perceives the reality beyond her appearance that she finds the mayor worthy of renewed devotion. For Valjean, the bedraggled prostitute verges on 'sanctity' through 'martyrdom' (640; sainteté . . . martyr)."

John Andrew Frey argues that the character has a political significance. Fantine is "an example of how women of the proletariat were brutalized in nineteenth-century France...Fantine represents Hugo's deep compassion for human suffering, especially for women born into low estate". Mario Vargas Llosa takes a less positive view, arguing that Hugo in effect punishes Fantine for her sexual transgression by making her suffer so horribly. "What disasters follow from a sin of the flesh! On the matter of sex, the morality of Les Misérables melds perfectly with the most intolerant and puritanical interpretation of Catholic morality."

Fantine's image as a saint-like symbol of female victimhood appears in the writings of the union leader Eugene V. Debs, founder of the Industrial Workers of the World. In 1916 he wrote the essay Fantine in our Day, in which he compared the sufferings of Fantine to abandoned women of his own day:

The very name of Fantine, the gay, guileless, trusting girl, the innocent, betrayed, self-immolating young mother, the despoiled, bedraggled, hunted and holy martyr to motherhood, to the infinite love of her child, touches to tears and haunts the memory like a melancholy dream....Fantine—child of poverty and starvation—the ruined girl, the abandoned mother, the hounded prostitute, remained to the very hour of her tragic death chaste as a virgin, spotless as a saint in the holy sanctuary of her own pure and undefiled soul. The brief, bitter, blasted life of Fantine epitomizes the ghastly story of the persecuted, perishing Fantines of modern society in every land in Christendom.

== In the musical ==
In the stage musical of the same name, Fantine is one of the central characters. Hers is considered an alto or mezzo-soprano role.

=== Differences in the musical ===
- Rather than being fired by a female supervisor for being an unwed mother, a fellow female worker steals her letter from the Thénardiers claiming another need for money; the worker presumes that she is a prostitute to cover her debts with the low wages. Valjean sees this, but leaves this to his foreman; the foreman, his advances having been rejected by Fantine, fires her.
- Fantine is not illiterate and does not sell her teeth (except in the film adaptation, in which she sells two of her back teeth).
- Bamatabois wants to buy Fantine's services and is angered when she rejects his advances. In the novel, he is a young layabout who humiliates her by putting snow down her dress as if she is an object of fun. In the film adaptation, he appears as a mix between the two, seeking to buy her services and then putting snow down her dress after she refuses.
- Fantine dies peacefully in hospital with Valjean at her side after entrusting him with Cosette. Javert never reveals Valjean's true identity to her, as he arrives after her death.
- Fantine appears as a ghost to accompany Valjean to Heaven. In the novel, by contrast, Valjean describes her to Cosette on his deathbed.

== Adaptations ==
Anne Hathaway as Fantine in the 2012 film adaptation, for which she won the Academy Award for Best Supporting Actress.

Since the original publication of Les Misérables in 1862, the character of Fantine has been in a large number of adaptations in numerous types of media based on the novel, including books, films, musicals, plays, and games. Anne Hathaway won the Academy Award for Best Supporting Actress for portraying Fantine in the 2012 film adaptation of Les Misérables.

Onstage, the role has been played by many actresses including Samantha Barks, Sierra Boggess, Kerry Ellis, Carrie Hope Fletcher, Ruthie Henshall, Rachelle Ann Go, Melora Hardin, Lucie Jones, Lauren Kennedy, Judy Kuhn, Caissie Levy, Patti LuPone, Andrea McArdle, Melba Moore, Paige O'Hara, Lindsay Heather Pearce, Alice Ripley, Daphne Rubin-Vega, and Lea Salonga.
