= Isle of Wight (constituency) =

Parliamentary constituency in the United Kingdom, 1832–2024

Coordinates: 50.684°N 1.320°W

The Isle of Wight
- Former county constituency for the House of Commons
- Location of Isle of Wight within England
- County: Isle of Wight
- Electorate: 113,021 (2019)
- Major settlements: Brading, Lake, Newport, Ryde, Sandown, Shanklin

1832–2024
- Seats: One
- Created from: Hampshire; Newtown; Yarmouth
- Replaced by: Isle of Wight East; Isle of Wight West

Isle of Wight (/waɪt/ WYTE) was a constituency (Note: A county constituency (for the purposes of election expenses and type of returning officer)) that was last represented in the House of Commons of the UK Parliament from 2017 until 2024 by Bob Seely, a Conservative.

Created by the Great Reform Act for the 1832 general election, it covered the whole of the Isle of Wight. It had the largest electorate of any constituency at the 2019 general election. (Note: As with all constituencies, the constituency elects one Member of Parliament (MP) by the first past the post system of election at least every five years.)

Following the 2023 Periodic Review of Westminster constituencies, the constituency was abolished for the 2024 general election. The island was divided into two constituencies, Isle of Wight East and Isle of Wight West.

== Boundaries ==
Map of boundaries 1832–2024

The Isle of Wight had been a single seat of the House of Commons since 1832. It covered the same land as the ceremonial county of the Isle of Wight and the area administered by the unitary authority, Isle of Wight Council: a diamond-shaped island with rounded oblique corners, measuring 22.5 miles (36.2 km) by 13 miles (21 km), the Needles and similar small uninhabitable rocks of very small square surface area. The island is linked by ferry crossings from four points (five points if counting Cowes and East Cowes separately) to three points in Hampshire: Lymington, Southampton and Portsmouth.

Its electorate of 113,021 at the 2019 general election was the largest in the UK, more than 50% above the UK average: 73,181, and five times the size of the smallest seat: Na h-Eileanan an Iar, formerly known as the Western Isles.

=== One or two seats problem ===
The reviews of the Boundary Commission for England since 1954 have consulted locally on splitting the island into two seats (and included occasional proposals for a seat crossing the Solent onto the mainland) but met an overall distaste by the independent commissioners and most consultees and consultation respondents. The consensus of varying panels of Boundary Commissioners, party-interested and neutral commentators is that the island would be best represented by one MP. The Commissioners did make mention perfunctorily of their duty by law to avoid such an extent of malapportionment (termed by most commissioners "leaving the island somewhat oversized"). One problem the independent body cited in 2008 was a difficulty of dividing the island in two in a way that would be acceptable to all major interests. The arbitrary division line problem is routinely encountered in those council areas which have no rural elements or natural divides.

Eventually, under the Parliamentary Voting System and Constituencies Act 2011, which proposed that the total number of constituencies in the UK Parliament should be reduced from 650 to 600, it was specified that the Isle of Wight should comprise two "protected" seats, meaning that their electorates did not have to be within the statutory range of ±5%. The 2011 Act was amended by the Parliamentary Constituencies Act 2020 which reversed the decrease in the total number of seats but retained the two protected seats for the Isle of Wight.

=== 2024 boundary changes ===
The Isle of Wight has elected one MP since 1832 but elected two MPs for the first time in the 2024 general election

Under the 2023 Periodic Review of Westminster constituencies which came into effect for the 2024 general election, the Boundary Commission for England proposed splitting the island into Isle of Wight East (electorate 56,805) and Isle of Wight West (electorate 54,911).

- Isle of Wight East will include the communities of Ryde, Bembridge, Brading, Sandown, Shanklin and Ventnor;
- Isle of Wight West will include the communities of Newport, East Cowes, Cowes and Freshwater.

== History ==
Before the Reform Act 1832 (apart from the First Protectorate Parliament (1654–1655), when a whole island constituency existed) the island was usually represented by three Parliamentary boroughs: Newport, Newtown, and Yarmouth, each electing two MPs. The county electorate of the island, which included freeholders qualified by property, was represented by the two MPs for Hampshire. The Reform Act abolished the Newtown and Yarmouth parliamentary boroughs, and a single-member county division of Hampshire was created for the island. The separate and overlapping Newport representation was reduced to one MP in 1868 and finally abolished in 1885. Since then, the whole of the Isle of Wight has been represented by one constituency.

The constituency has traditionally been a battleground between the Conservatives and the Liberal Democrats and their predecessors. The seat was held by a Liberal from 1974 until 1987, a Conservative until 1997, a Liberal Democrat until 2001, and a Conservative since then.

At the 2015 election, the incumbent Conservative scored one of his party's largest swings against the Liberal Democrats whose candidate finished in fifth place.

In the 2017 general election, the Labour candidate gained second place with the party's best result since 1966. Nick Belfitt, the Liberal Democrat candidate, became the youngest ever candidate to stand for the seat at the age of 23.

At the December 2019 general election, Labour came second, marginally increasing the party's vote total and share of the poll compared to 2017. The Liberal Democrats agreed to stand aside and support the Green Party candidate as part the Unite to Remain agreement between the two parties and Plaid Cymru involving 60 constituencies in England and Wales, with the purpose of increasing the chances of candidates who supported remaining in the European Union.

== Members of Parliament ==
=== Pre 1832 ===
- 1654: Lord Lisle; William Sydenham
- 1830–1831: Horrace Twiss

=== Since 1832 ===
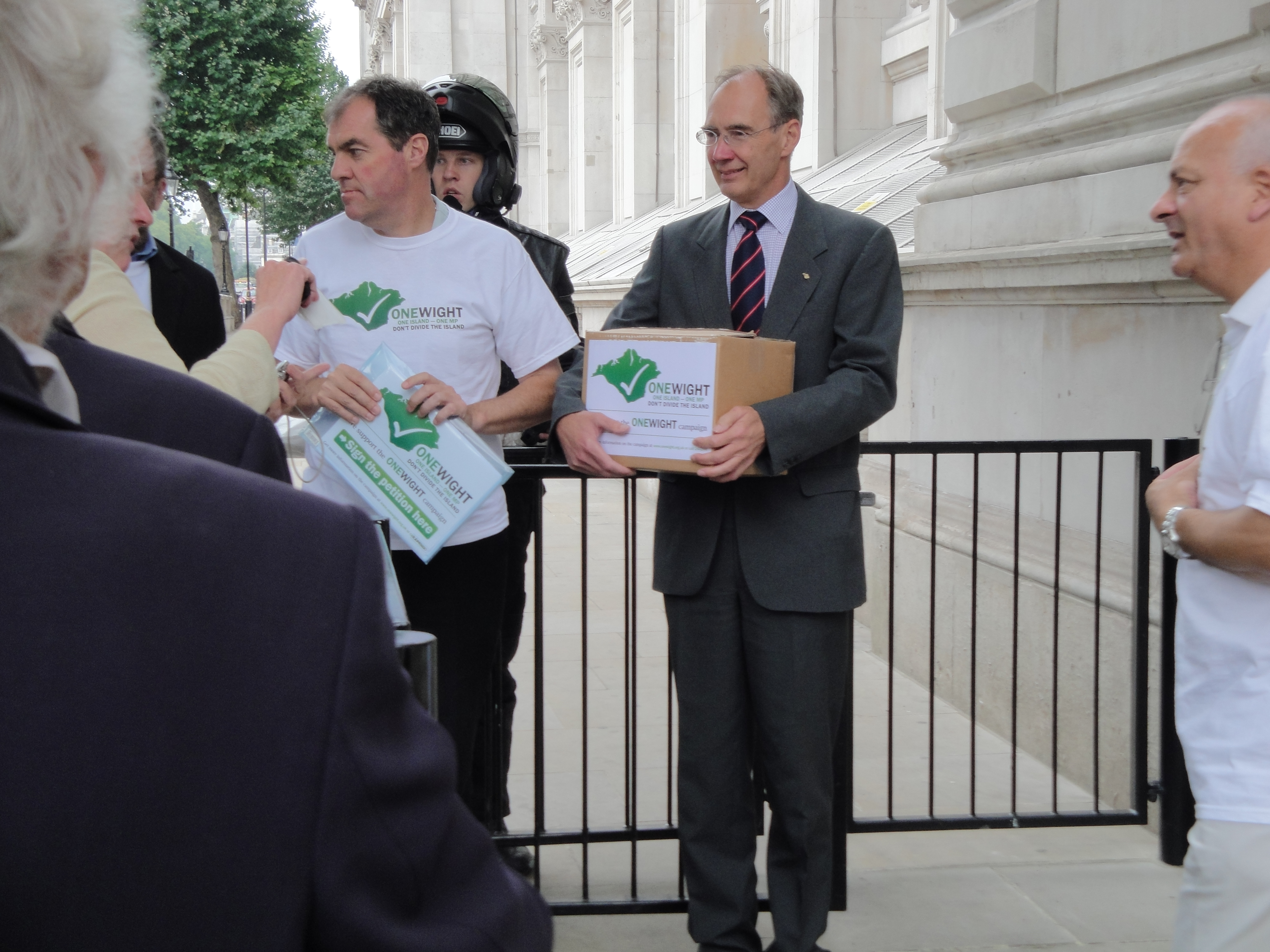
Andrew Turner (pictured in 2010) served as the MP from 2001 to 2017.

Election	Member	Party
1832	Sir Richard Simeon, Bt	Whig
1837	William Holmes à Court	Conservative
1847	John Simeon	Whig
1851 by-election	Edward Dawes	Radical
1852	Francis Venables-Vernon-Harcourt	Conservative
1857	Charles Clifford	Whig
1859	Charles Clifford	Liberal
1865	John Simeon	Liberal
1870 by-election	Alexander Baillie-Cochrane	Conservative
1880	Evelyn Ashley	Liberal
1885	Richard Webster	Conservative
1900	John Seely	Conservative
1904 by-election	John Seely	Ind. Conservative
1906	Godfrey Baring	Liberal
1910	Douglas Hall	Conservative
1922	Sir Edgar Chatfeild-Clarke	Liberal
1923	John Seely	Liberal
1924	Peter Macdonald	Conservative
1959	Mark Woodnutt	Conservative
February 1974	Stephen Ross	Liberal
1987	Barry Field	Conservative
1997	Peter Brand	Liberal Democrats
2001	Andrew Turner	Conservative
2017	Bob Seely	Conservative

== Elections ==
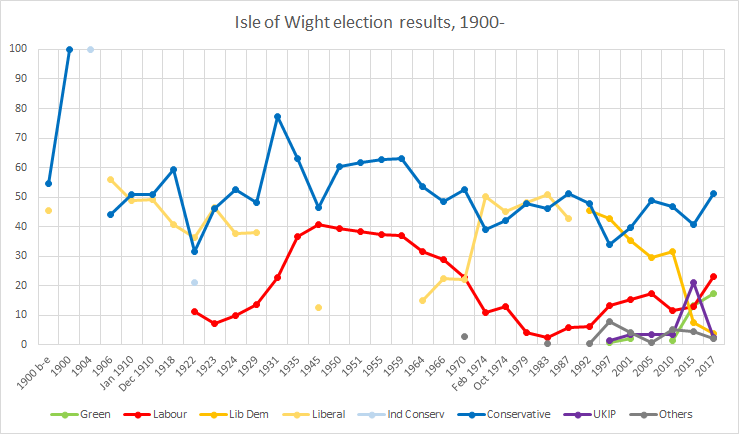
Isle of Wight historical election results

=== Elections in the 2010s ===
General election 2019: Isle of Wight
Party	Candidate	Votes	%	±%
Conservative	Bob Seely	41,815	56.2	+4.9
Labour	Richard Quigley	18,078	24.3	+1.3
Green	Vix Lowthion	11,338	15.2	−2.1
Ind. Network	Carl Feeney	1,542	2.1	New
Independent	Karl Love	874	1.2	New
Independent	Daryll Pitcher	795	1.1	New
Majority		23,737	31.9	+3.6
Turnout		74,442	65.9	−1.4
Registered electors		113,021		
Conservative hold		Swing	+1.8	

General election 2017: Isle of Wight
Party	Candidate	Votes	%	±%
Conservative	Bob Seely	38,190	51.3	+10.6
Labour	Julian Critchley	17,121	23.0	+10.2
Green	Vix Lowthion	12,915	17.3	+3.9
Liberal Democrats	Nicholas Belfitt	2,740	3.7	−3.8
UKIP	Daryll Pitcher	1,921	2.6	−18.6
Independent	Julie Jones-Evans	1,592	2.1	New
Majority		21,069	28.3	+8.8
Turnout		74,479	67.3	+2.3
Registered electors		110,683		
Conservative hold		Swing	+0.2	

General election 2015: Isle of Wight
Party	Candidate	Votes	%	±%
Conservative	Andrew Turner	28,591	40.7	−6.0
UKIP	Iain McKie	14,888	21.2	+17.7
Green	Vix Lowthion	9,404	13.4	+12.1
Labour	Stewart Blackmore	8,984	12.8	+1.2
Liberal Democrats	David Goodall	5,235	7.5	−24.2
Independent	Ian Stephens	3,198	4.5	New
Majority		13,703	19.5	+4.5
Turnout		70,300	65.0	+1.1
Registered electors		108,804		
Conservative hold		Swing	-11.8	

General election 2010: Isle of Wight
Party	Candidate	Votes	%	±%
Conservative	Andrew Turner	32,810	46.7	−2.2
Liberal Democrats	Jill Wareham	22,283	31.7	+2.2
Labour	Mark Chiverton	8,169	11.6	−5.6
UKIP	Michael Tarrant	2,435	3.5	0.0
BNP	Geoff Clynch	1,457	2.1	New
English Democrat	Ian Dunsire	1,233	1.8	New
Green	Bob Keats	931	1.3	New
Middle England Party	Paul Martin	616	0.9	New
Independent	Pete Harris	175	0.2	New
Independent	Paul Randle-Jolliffe	89	0.1	New
Independent	Edward Corby	66	0.1	−0.7
Majority		10,527	15.0	−4.4
Turnout		70,264	63.9	+2.6
Registered electors		109,922		
Conservative hold		Swing	-2.2	

=== Elections in the 2000s ===
General election 2005: Isle of Wight
Party	Candidate	Votes	%	±%
Conservative	Andrew Turner	32,717	48.9	+9.2
Liberal Democrats	Anthony Rowlands	19,739	29.5	−5.8
Labour	Mark Chiverton	11,484	17.2	+2.0
UKIP	Michael Tarrant	2,352	3.5	+0.2
Independent	Edward Corby	551	0.8	New
Majority		12,978	19.4	+15.0
Turnout		66,843	61.3	+0.5
Registered electors		107,737		
Conservative hold		Swing	+7.5	

General election 2001: Isle of Wight
Party	Candidate	Votes	%	±%
Conservative	Andrew Turner	25,223	39.7	+5.7
Liberal Democrats	Peter Brand	22,397	35.3	−7.4
Labour	Deborah Gardiner	9,676	15.2	+2.0
UKIP	David Lott	2,106	3.3	+1.8
Independent	David Holmes	1,423	2.2	New
Green	Paul Scivier	1,279	2.0	+1.3
Isle of Wight Party	Philip Murray	1,164	1.8	New
Socialist Labour	James Spensley	214	0.3	New
Majority		2,826	4.4	N/A
Turnout		63,482	60.8	−11.2
Registered electors		104,431		
Conservative gain from Liberal Democrats		Swing	-6.6	

=== Elections in the 1990s ===
General election 1997: Isle of Wight
Party	Candidate	Votes	%	±%
Liberal Democrats	Peter Brand	31,274	42.7	−2.9
Conservative	Andrew Turner	24,868	34.0	−13.9
Labour	Deborah Gardiner	9,646	13.2	+7.2
Referendum	Tim Bristow	4,734	6.5	New
UKIP	Malcom Turner	1,072	1.5	New
Independent	Harry Rees	848	1.2	New
Green	Paul Scivier	544	0.7	New
Natural Law	Clive Daly	87	0.1	−0.3
Rainbow Dream Ticket	Jonathan Eveleigh	86	0.1	New
Majority		6,406	8.7	N/A
Turnout		73,159	72.0	−7.8
Registered electors		101,680		
Liberal Democrats gain from Conservative		Swing	+8.4	

General election 1992: Isle of Wight
Party	Candidate	Votes	%	±%
Conservative	Barry Field	38,163	47.9	−3.3
Liberal Democrats	Peter Brand	36,336	45.6	+2.7
Labour	Ken Pearson	4,784	6.0	+0.1
Natural Law	Clive Daly	350	0.4	New
Majority		1,827	2.3	−6.0
Turnout		79,633	79.8	+0.2
Registered electors		99,839		
Conservative hold		Swing	−3.0	

=== Elections in the 1980s ===
General election 1987: Isle of Wight
Party	Candidate	Votes	%	±%
Conservative	Barry Field	40,175	51.2	+4.9
Liberal	Michael Young	33,733	42.9	−8.1
Labour	Kenn Pearson	4,626	5.9	+3.5
Majority		6,442	8.3	N/A
Turnout		78,560	79.6	−0.4
Registered electors		98,694		
Conservative gain from Liberal		Swing		

General election 1983: Isle of Wight
Party	Candidate	Votes	%	±%
Liberal	Stephen Ross	38,407	51.0	+2.8
Conservative	Virginia Bottomley	34,904	46.3	−1.4
Labour	Catherine Wilson	1,828	2.4	−1.6
Isle of Wight Residents Party	Thomas McDermott	208	0.3	New
Majority		3,503	4.7	+4.2
Turnout		75,347	80.0	−1.8
Registered electors		94,226		
Liberal hold		Swing		

=== Elections in the 1970s ===
General election 1979: Isle of Wight
Party	Candidate	Votes	%	±%
Liberal	Stephen Ross	35,889	48.2	+3.1
Conservative	Dudley Fishburn	35,537	47.7	+5.7
Labour	Catherine Wilson	3,014	4.0	−9.0
Majority		352	0.5	−2.6
Turnout		74,440	81.8	+5.1
Registered electors		90,961		
Liberal hold		Swing		

General election October 1974: Isle of Wight
Party	Candidate	Votes	%	±%
Liberal	Stephen Ross	29,697	45.1	−5.1
Conservative	Dudley Fishburn	27,657	42.0	+3.0
Labour	L.D. Brooke	8,562	13.0	+2.2
Majority		2,040	3.1	−8.1
Turnout		65,916	76.7	−4.7
Registered electors		85,897		
Liberal hold		Swing		

General election February 1974: Isle of Wight
Party	Candidate	Votes	%	±%
Liberal	Stephen Ross	34,808	50.2	+28.0
Conservative	Mark Woodnutt	27,042	39.0	−13.4
Labour	TC Bisson	7,495	10.8	−11.8
Majority		7,766	11.2	N/A
Turnout		69,345	81.4	+9.4
Registered electors		85,208		
Liberal gain from Conservative		Swing	+20.7	

General election 1970: Isle of Wight
Party	Candidate	Votes	%	±%
Conservative	Mark Woodnutt	30,437	52.4	+3.8
Labour	Kent Boulton	13,111	22.6	−6.4
Liberal	Stephen Ross	12,883	22.2	−0.2
Vectis National Party	Ronald W.J Cowdell	1,607	2.8	New
Majority		17,326	29.8	+10.2
Turnout		58,038	72.0	−3.0
Registered electors		80,537		
Conservative hold		Swing		

=== Elections in the 1960s ===
General election 1966: Isle of Wight
Party	Candidate	Votes	%	±%
Conservative	Mark Woodnutt	25,862	48.6	−4.9
Labour	Peter Stephenson	15,411	29.0	−2.6
Liberal	Stephen Ross	11,915	22.4	+7.5
Majority		10,451	19.6	−2.3
Turnout		53,188	75.0	+0.7
Registered electors		70,877		
Conservative hold		Swing		

General election 1964: Isle of Wight
Party	Candidate	Votes	%	±%
Conservative	Mark Woodnutt	27,497	53.5	−9.4
Labour	William Mann	16,244	31.6	−5.5
Liberal	Barbara Bliss	7,666	14.9	New
Majority		11,253	21.9	−3.9
Turnout		51,407	74.3	+0.2
Registered electors		69,215		
Conservative hold		Swing		

=== Elections in the 1950s ===
General election 1959: Isle of Wight
Party	Candidate	Votes	%	±%
Conservative	Mark Woodnutt	31,228	62.9	+0.3
Labour	Edward Cecil Amey	18,396	37.1	−0.3
Majority		12,832	25.8	+0.6
Turnout		49,624	74.1	−0.3
Registered electors		66,939		
Conservative hold		Swing		

General election 1955: Isle of Wight
Party	Candidate	Votes	%	±%
Conservative	Peter Macdonald	31,335	62.6	+0.8
Labour	Sydney Conbeer	18,698	37.4	−0.8
Majority		12,637	25.2	+1.6
Turnout		50,033	74.4	−5.9
Registered electors		67,297		
Conservative hold		Swing		

General election 1951: Isle of Wight
Party	Candidate	Votes	%	±%
Conservative	Peter Macdonald	33,501	61.8	+1.3
Labour	Sydney Conbeer	20,712	38.2	−1.3
Majority		12,789	23.6	+2.6
Turnout		54,213	80.3	−0.3
Registered electors		67,501		
Conservative hold		Swing		

General election 1950: Isle of Wight
Party	Candidate	Votes	%	±%
Conservative	Peter Macdonald	32,984	60.5	+13.9
Labour	Sydney Conbeer	21,496	39.5	−1.2
Majority		11,488	21.0	+15.1
Turnout		54,480	80.6	+4.6
Registered electors		67,581		
Conservative hold		Swing		

=== Elections in the 1940s ===
General election 1945: Isle of Wight
Party	Candidate	Votes	%	±%
Conservative	Peter Macdonald	22,036	46.6	−16.58
Labour	William Miller	19,252	40.7	+3.87
Liberal	May O'Conor	5,967	12.6	New
Majority		2,784	5.9	−20.47
Turnout		47,255	76.0	+6.56
Registered electors		62,364		
Conservative hold		Swing		

General election 1939–40

Another general election was required to take place before the end of 1940. The political parties had been making preparations for an election to take place from 1939 and by the end of this year, the following candidates had been selected;

- Conservative: Peter Macdonald
- Labour: Robert Arthur Lyster
- Liberal: Helen de Guerry Browne

=== Elections in the 1930s ===
General election 1935: Isle of Wight
Party	Candidate	Votes	%	±%
Conservative	Peter Macdonald	26,748	63.18	−14.07
Labour	William Miller	15,586	36.83	+14.07
Majority		11,162	26.35	−28.15
Turnout		42,334	69.44	−1.68
Registered electors		60,965		
Conservative hold		Swing		

General election 1931: Isle of Wight
Party	Candidate	Votes	%	±%
Conservative	Peter Macdonald	32,728	77.25	+29.05
Labour	James Drummond	9,639	22.75	+9.05
Majority		23,089	54.50	+44.50
Turnout		42,367	71.12	−7.88
Registered electors		59,574		
Conservative hold		Swing		

=== Elections in the 1920s ===
General election 1929: Isle of Wight
Party	Candidate	Votes	%	±%
Unionist	Peter Macdonald	21,949	48.2	−4.2
Liberal	St John Hutchinson	17,383	38.1	+0.3
Labour	Henry Edward Weaver	6,256	13.7	+3.9
Majority		4,566	10.1	−4.5
Turnout		45,588	79.0	−1.1
Registered electors		57,693		
Unionist hold		Swing	-2.3	

General election 1924: Isle of Wight
Party	Candidate	Votes	%	±%
Unionist	Peter Macdonald	19,346	52.4	+6.1
Liberal	John Seely	13,944	37.8	−8.8
Labour	Henry Edward Weaver	3,620	9.8	+2.7
Majority		5,402	14.6	N/A
Turnout		36,910	80.1	+4.5
Registered electors		46,052		
Unionist gain from Liberal		Swing	+7.5	

General election 1923: Isle of Wight
Party	Candidate	Votes	%	±%
Liberal	John Seely	16,249	46.6	+10.4
Unionist	Peter Macdonald	16,159	46.3	+14.7
Labour	Emily Palmer	2,475	7.1	−4.1
Majority		90	0.3	−4.3
Turnout		34,883	76.6	+1.2
Registered electors		45,530		
Liberal hold		Swing	-2.2	

General election 1922: Isle of Wight
Party	Candidate	Votes	%	±%
Liberal	Edgar Chatfeild-Clarke	12,202	36.2	−4.6
Unionist	John Perowne	10,620	31.6	−27.6
Ind. Unionist	Arthur Veasey	7,061	21.0	New
Labour	Harold Shearman	3,756	11.2	New
Majority		1,582	4.6	N/A
Turnout		33,639	75.4	+9.9
Registered electors		44,637		
Liberal gain from Unionist		Swing	+11.5	

=== Elections in the 1910s ===
General election 1918: Isle of Wight
Party		Candidate	Votes	%	±%
C	Unionist	Douglas Hall	16,274	59.2	+8.4
	Liberal	Godfrey Baring	11,235	40.8	−8.4
Majority			5,039	18.4	+16.8
Turnout			27,509	65.5	−23.2
Registered electors			42,013		
	Unionist hold		Swing	+8.4	
C indicates candidate endorsed by the coalition government.

Another general election was required to take place before the end of 1915. The political parties had been making preparations for an election to take place and by July 1914, the following candidates had been selected;

- Unionist: Douglas Hall
- Liberal: Godfrey Baring

Scaramanga-Ralli

General election December 1910: Isle of Wight
Party	Candidate	Votes	%	±%
Conservative	Douglas Hall	7,192	50.8	−0.2
Liberal	Constantine Scaramanga-Ralli	6,969	49.2	+0.2
Majority		223	1.6	−0.4
Turnout		14,161	88.7	−2.3
Registered electors		15,969		
Conservative hold		Swing	-0.2	

General election January 1910: Isle of Wight
Party	Candidate	Votes	%	±%
Conservative	Douglas Hall	7,414	51.0	+6.8
Liberal	Godfrey Baring	7,123	49.0	−6.8
Majority		291	2.0	N/A
Turnout		14,537	91.0	+3.2
Registered electors		15,969		
Conservative gain from Liberal		Swing	+6.8	

=== Elections in the 1900s ===
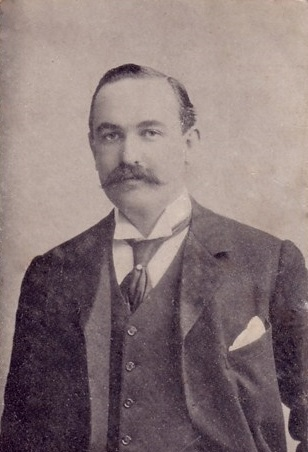
Baring

General election 1906: Isle of Wight
Party	Candidate	Votes	%	±%
Liberal	Godfrey Baring	7,453	55.8	New
Conservative	Anthony Hickman Morgan	5,892	44.2	N/A
Majority		1,561	11.6	N/A
Turnout		13,345	87.8	N/A
Registered electors		15,193		
Liberal gain from Conservative		Swing	N/A	

Seely

1904 Isle of Wight by-election
Party	Candidate	Votes	%	±%
Ind. Conservative	John Seely	Unopposed		
Registered electors				
Ind. Conservative gain from Conservative				

General election 1900: Isle of Wight
Party	Candidate	Votes	%	±%
Conservative	John Seely	Unopposed		
Registered electors		14,494		
Conservative hold				

1900 Isle of Wight by-election
Party	Candidate	Votes	%	±%
Conservative	John Seely	6,432	54.5	+2.5
Liberal	Godfrey Baring	5,370	45.5	−2.5
Majority		1,062	9.0	+5.0
Turnout		11,802	81.4	+0.5
Registered electors		14,494		
Conservative hold		Swing	+2.5	

=== Elections in the 1890s ===
General election 1895: Isle of Wight
Party	Candidate	Votes	%	±%
Conservative	Richard Webster	5,809	52.0	−0.1
Liberal	Armine Wodehouse	5,363	48.0	+0.1
Majority		446	4.0	−0.2
Turnout		11,172	80.9	−3.5
Registered electors		13,816		
Conservative hold		Swing	-0.1	

General election 1892: Isle of Wight
Party	Candidate	Votes	%	±%
Conservative	Richard Webster	5,699	52.1	−4.7
Liberal	Sigismund Mendl	5,238	47.9	+4.7
Majority		461	4.2	−9.4
Turnout		10,937	84.4	+6.7
Registered electors		12,957		
Conservative hold		Swing	-4.7	

=== Elections in the 1880s ===
1886 Isle of Wight by-election
Party	Candidate	Votes	%	±%
Conservative	Richard Webster	Unopposed		
Registered electors		11,943		
Conservative hold				

- Caused by Webster's appointment as Attorney General for England and Wales.

General election 1886: Isle of Wight
Party	Candidate	Votes	%	±%
Conservative	Richard Webster	5,271	56.8	+4.7
Liberal	John Stuart	4,013	43.2	−4.7
Majority		1,258	13.6	+9.4
Turnout		9,284	77.7	−10.7
Registered electors		11,943		
Conservative hold		Swing	+4.7	

General election 1885: Isle of Wight
Party	Candidate	Votes	%	±%
Conservative	Richard Webster	5,495	52.1	+2.3
Liberal	Evelyn Ashley	5,059	47.9	−2.3
Majority		436	4.2	N/A
Turnout		10,554	88.4	+8.5
Registered electors		11,943		
Conservative gain from Liberal		Swing	+2.3	

General election 1880: Isle of Wight
Party	Candidate	Votes	%	±%
Liberal	Evelyn Ashley	1,986	50.2	+0.3
Conservative	Benjamin Temple Cotton	1,973	49.8	−0.3
Majority		13	0.4	N/A
Turnout		3,959	79.9	+1.1
Registered electors		4,954		
Liberal gain from Conservative		Swing	+0.3	

=== Elections in the 1870s ===
General election 1874: Isle of Wight
Party	Candidate	Votes	%	±%
Conservative	Alexander Baillie-Cochrane	1,614	50.1	+4.9
Liberal	Evelyn Ashley	1,605	49.9	−4.9
Majority		9	0.2	N/A
Turnout		3,219	78.8	+13.9
Registered electors		4,084		
Conservative gain from Liberal		Swing	+4.9	

1870 Isle of Wight by-election
Party	Candidate	Votes	%	±%
Conservative	Alexander Baillie-Cochrane	1,317	50.7	+5.5
Liberal	George Moffatt	1,282	49.3	−5.5
Majority		35	1.4	N/A
Turnout		2,599	68.3	+3.4
Registered electors		3,807		
Conservative gain from Liberal		Swing	+5.5	

- Caused by Simeon's death.

=== Elections in the 1860s ===
General election 1868: Isle of Wight
Party	Candidate	Votes	%	±%
Liberal	John Simeon	1,353	54.8	+2.3
Conservative	Alexander Baillie-Cochrane	1,118	45.2	−2.3
Majority		235	9.6	+4.6
Turnout		2,471	64.9	+0.3
Registered electors		3,807		
Liberal hold		Swing	+2.3	

General election 1865: Isle of Wight
Party	Candidate	Votes	%	±%
Liberal	John Simeon	786	52.5	+0.4
Conservative	Charles Locock	710	47.5	−0.4
Majority		76	5.0	+0.8
Turnout		1,496	64.6	−6.5
Registered electors		2,315		
Liberal hold		Swing	+0.4	

=== Elections in the 1850s ===
General election 1859: Isle of Wight
Party	Candidate	Votes	%	±%
Liberal	Charles Clifford	756	52.1	−2.4
Conservative	Francis Venables-Vernon-Harcourt	694	47.9	+2.4
Majority		62	4.2	−4.8
Turnout		1,450	71.1	+2.3
Registered electors		2,038		
Liberal hold		Swing	−2.4	

General election 1857: Isle of Wight
Party	Candidate	Votes	%	±%
Whig	Charles Clifford	730	54.5	+8.0
Conservative	Thomas Willis Fleming	610	45.5	−8.0
Majority		120	9.0	N/A
Turnout		1,340	68.8	−8.4
Registered electors		1,949		
Whig gain from Conservative		Swing	+8.0	

General election 1852: Isle of Wight
Party	Candidate	Votes	%	±%
Conservative	Francis Venables-Vernon-Harcourt	681	53.5	+9.6
Radical	Edward Dawes	593	46.5	−9.6
Majority		88	7.0	N/A
Turnout		1,274	77.2	+4.4
Registered electors		1,650		
Conservative gain from Whig		Swing	+9.6	

By-election, 29 May 1851: Isle of Wight
Party	Candidate	Votes	%	±%
Radical	Edward Dawes	565	52.1	−4.0
Conservative	Andrew Snape Hamond	519	47.9	+4.0
Majority		46	4.2	N/A
Turnout		1,084	65.7	−7.1
Registered electors		1,650		
Radical gain from Whig		Swing	−4.0	

- Caused by Simeon's resignation after he converted from Anglicanism to Catholicism.

=== Elections in the 1840s ===
General election 1847: Isle of Wight
Party	Candidate	Votes	%	±%
Whig	John Simeon	476	56.1	New
Conservative	Thomas Willis Fleming	373	43.9	N/A
Majority		103	12.2	N/A
Turnout		849	72.8	N/A
Registered electors		1,167		
Whig gain from Conservative		Swing	N/A	

General election 1841: Isle of Wight
Party	Candidate	Votes	%	±%
Conservative	William à Court-Holmes	Unopposed		
Registered electors		1,167		
Conservative hold				

=== Elections in the 1830s ===
General election 1837: Isle of Wight
Party	Candidate	Votes	%	±%
Conservative	William à Court-Holmes	628	52.9	+11.8
Whig	Dudley Pelham	560	47.1	−11.8
Majority		68	5.8	N/A
Turnout		1,188		
Registered electors				
Conservative gain from Whig		Swing	+11.8	

General election 1835: Isle of Wight
Party	Candidate	Votes	%	±%
Whig	Richard Simeon	483	58.9	−27.5
Conservative	George Henry Ward	337	41.1	+27.5
Majority		146	17.8	−55.0
Turnout		820	c. 70.3	c. −0.3
Registered electors		c. 1,167		
Whig hold		Swing	−27.5	

General election 1832: Isle of Wight
Party	Candidate	Votes	%
Whig	Richard Simeon	712	86.4
Tory	Alexander Glynn Campbell	112	13.6
Majority		600	72.8
Turnout		824	70.6
Registered electors		1,167	
Whig win (new seat)			

== See also ==
- Politics of the Isle of Wight
- List of parliamentary constituencies in the South East (region)
- List of United Kingdom Parliament constituencies
