= Simeon baronets =

Set index for Simeon baronets

There have been two baronetcies created for persons with the surname Simeon, one in the Baronetage of England and one in the Baronetage of the United Kingdom. As of 2026 one creation is extant.

- Simeon baronets of Chilworth (1677)
- Simeon baronets of Grazeley (1815)
