= Barlavington =

Village and civil parish in West Sussex, England

Coordinates: 50.93593°N 0.61747°W

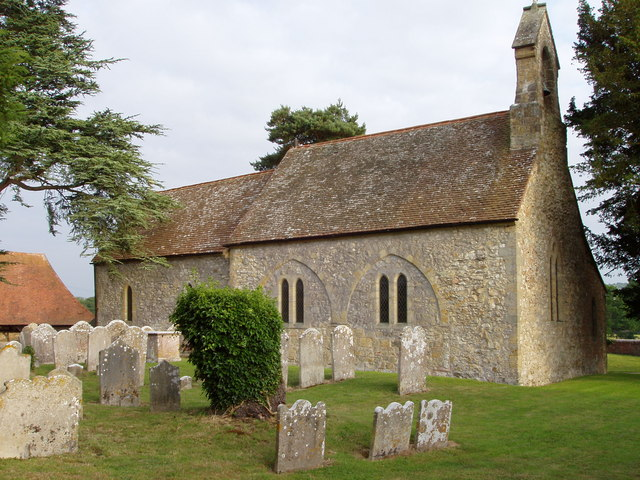
- St Mary's Church, Barlavington

- Location within West Sussex
- Area: 3.97 km^{2} (1.53 sq mi)
- Population: 117 2001 Census
  - Density: 43/km^{2} (110/sq mi)
- OS grid reference: SU972160
  - London: 45 miles (72 km) NNE
- Civil parish: Barlavington
- District: Chichester
- Shire county: West Sussex
- Region: South East
- Country: England
- Sovereign state: United Kingdom
- Post town: PETWORTH
- Postcode district: GU28
- Dialling code: 01798
- Police: Sussex
- Fire: West Sussex
- Ambulance: South East Coast
- UK Parliament: Arundel and South Downs

Barlavington is a small village and civil parish in the Chichester district of West Sussex, England. The village is situated about four miles (6.4 km) south of Petworth, east of the A285 road. At the 2011 Census the population was included in the civil parish of Sutton.

The nearest railway station is five miles (8.0 km) northeast of the village, at Pulborough.

St Mary's Church was built between 1160 and 1190. Most of the church was built in Early English style. The church was reconstructed in 1874 by an unknown architect.

The parish is home to Barlavington Manor, a residential care home.

The parish covers an area of 397 hectares (980 acres). According to the 2001 census it had a population of 117 people living in 35 households. Owing to the presence of the retirement home only 36 people were economically active.
