= Sandra Gidley =

British pharmacist and politician (born 1957)

Sandra Gidley MRPharmS
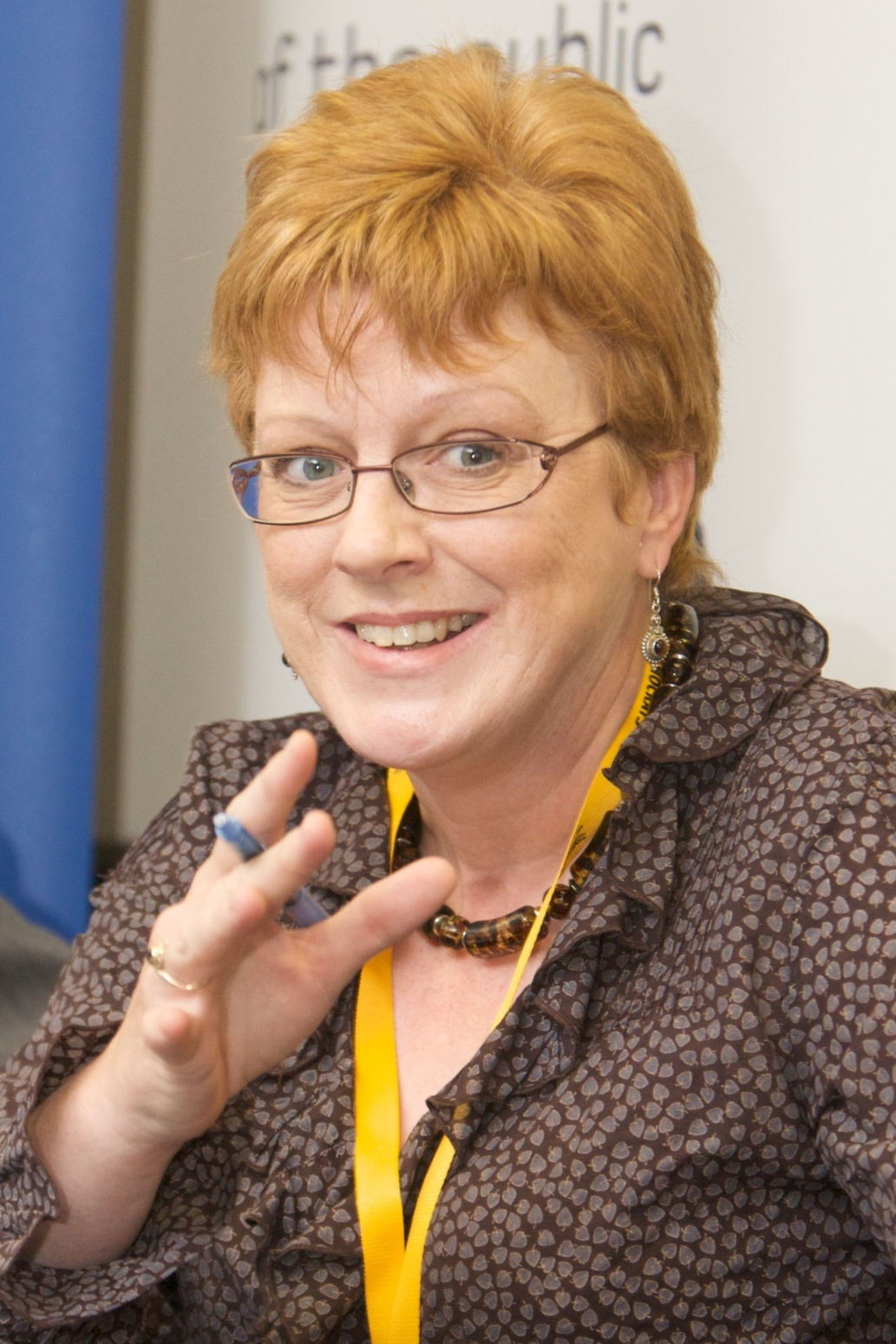
- Gidley at a Health Hotel session during the 2009 Liberal Democrat Party Conference

Member of Parliament for Romsey
- In office 4 May 2000 – 12 April 2010
- Preceded by: Michael Colvin
- Succeeded by: constituency abolished

Personal details
- Born: Sandra Julia Rawson; 26 March 1957 (age 69) Rossett, Wales
- Party: Liberal Democrat
- Spouse: Bill
- Children: 2
- Education: University of Bath
- Profession: Pharmacist

Sandra Julia Gidley MRPharmS (née Rawson; born 26 March 1957) is a British pharmacist and politician who served as the Liberal Democrat Member of Parliament (MP) for Romsey in Hampshire from 2000 to 2010, when she lost her seat to Conservative candidate Caroline Nokes.

== Biography ==
Born Sandra Julia Rawson in Rossett, Denbighshire in Wales, she was educated at the Eggar's Grammar School in Alton, Hampshire; the Afcent International School in Brunssum, Netherlands; and the Windsor Girls' School in Hamm, North Rhine-Westphalia, Germany. She finished her education at the University of Bath, where she was awarded a BPharm Diploma in 1978. She became a MRPharmS in 1979.

In 1979 she joined Badham Chemists as a pharmacist in Cheltenham, Gloucestershire, until she was appointed as a pharmacy manager with GK Chemists in Gloucester in 1980. She became a locum pharmacist in 1982 before joining Safeway as a supermarket pharmacy manager in 1992, and joined Tesco in the same position in 1999 where she remained until her election to the House of Commons.

On 17 July 2019, Gidley was announced as the first female President of the Royal Pharmaceutical Society. She was followed by another woman, Claire Anderson, in 2021.

== Parliamentary career ==
She joined the Liberal Democrats in 1994, was elected as a councillor to the Test Valley Borough Council in 1995 and was, in 1997, the youngest ever female mayor of Romsey.

After Romsey's Conservative MP Michael Colvin died in a fire at his home in Tangley on 24 February 2000, Gidley was selected as the Liberal Democrat candidate for the resulting by-election. She won the by-election, on 4 May, with a majority of 3,311 votes and won in the 2001 and 2005 general elections. However, in 2005 her majority was reduced to only 125 votes, the smallest of any Lib Dem MP, by the Conservative candidate, Caroline Nokes. She was appointed as the party's spokeswoman on women's issues and older people from 2001. In January 2006, as Kennedy faced allegations of a drink problem, Gidley was one of 11 members of the front-bench team to write to Kennedy asking him to resign. Gidley chaired her party's Gender Balance Task Force, an initiative to get more women into politics.

The Romsey constituency was abolished for the 2010 election, and in the new Romsey and Southampton North constituency she was defeated by the Conservative candidate Caroline Nokes, who took the new seat a majority of 4,165 votes following the expenses scandal, in which it emerged Gidley accepted a £18,700 'windfall' from her London landlord in return for an increase in her taxpayer funded rent.

== Criticism of parliamentary expenses ==
Gidley was sometimes described as "Hampshire's most expensive MP" by her political opponents, claiming £160,000 in 2007/08, and £187,000 in another year, amidst concerns she was using tax payer's money to fund her political and re-election campaign. It emerged the tax payer was paying money to her party's constituency office, including paying the business rates, £60 for water, over £600 a year on telephones, and £960 on tea, coffee and cleaning. In 2011, her successor, Conservative MP Caroline Nokes, claimed £87,000 a year less in expenses than Gidley. However in 2017–2018 Nokes was claiming £168,297.18 in expenses. Whilst an MP, Gidley was claiming £1,638 a month for a luxury flat with indoor swimming pool in London, as well as £420 a month for food, and over £1,000 for Council Tax, and was criticised when it emerged she and three other Lib Dem MPs, accepted a £18,700 cash windfall from the landlord of the Dolphin Square flat, in return for agreeing to an increase in their rent, which was funded by the taxpayer. She was found to have "accepted one-off cash payment from the owners of an apartment block close to Parliament in return for agreeing to pay higher rent levels". A Parliamentary Committee on Standards and Privileges was critical of Gidley's 'serious misjudgment' in accepting the windfall, said she had broken the rules, and she was forced to apologise for it.

== Return to local politics ==
Gidley stood unsuccessfully in the 2013 Hampshire County Council election against incumbent Conservative Party councillor Roy Perry, former Member of the European Parliament and also the father of Caroline Nokes, the Conservative candidate who defeated her in 2010.

In the 2019 local election, Gidley returned to Test Valley Borough Council as the councillor for Romsey Abbey ward defeating the Conservative incumbent. She was re-elected in 2023. She is a candidate in the 2026 Hampshire County Council election.

== Lord Rennard ==
Gidley was her Party's Front Bench Spokesperson on Women's issues, and Chair of the Lib Dems 'Gender Balance Taskforce' at the time it emerged the Party's Chief Executive, Lord Rennard, was accused of a series of sexual assaults against women. She appeared on the BBC and admitted that the Lib Dems had 'screwed up'. However, several days later she claimed she had informed party leader Nick Clegg of the concerns over Rennard's conduct. Neither Nick Clegg or Sandra Gidley knew of any specific details as stated by Clegg's spokesman "Sandra Gidley once raised general concerns with Nick Clegg about Lord Rennard's conduct. She did not know of or raise specific allegations.".

== Personal life ==
Gidley and her husband Bill, an electronics engineer, married in 1979 and have lived in Romsey since 1986. They have a daughter, Gemma, and a son, Nick, who both attended local state schools. Gidley was for many years a voluntary antenatal teacher with the National Childbirth Trust and has been involved with many charitable organisations.

She enjoys badminton, and lists reading, cookery and the theatre amongst her hobbies, and is a supporter of Macmillan Cancer Relief.

== See also ==
- Liberal Democrat Frontbench Team

Parliament of the United Kingdom
Preceded by Michael Colvin	Member of Parliament for Romsey; 2000–2010	Constituency abolished (see Romsey and Southampton North)
