= Advisory Committee on Works of Art =

Committee of the UK House of Commons

The Advisory Committee on Works of Art is a committee of the House of Commons of the United Kingdom. The Committee is responsible for purchasing works of art for the House of Commons; advising the Speaker on all matters relating to Commons' works of art; and advising the Speaker, the Curator of Works of Art, and other officials with respect to the interpretation (e.g., explanatory signs and brochures), care, and management of artwork, furniture, furnishings, and decorative elements within the Palace of Westminster and the other buildings of the Parliamentary Estate.

== Chairs ==
Committee chairs include those listed below.

Name	Start	End	Party	Constituency
Frank Doran	18 November 2010	30 March 2015	Labour	Aberdeen North
Caroline Nokes	8 July 2015	17 July 2016	Conservative	Romsey and Southampton North
Alison McGovern	26 October 2016	6 November 2019	Labour	Wirral South
Hywel Williams	20 May 2020	15 October 2021	Plaid Cymru	Arfon
Dean Russell	20 May 2020	30 May 2024	Conservative	Watford
Caroline Nokes	6 February 2025	present	Conservative	Romsey and Southampton North

== Members ==
=== 2024– Parliament ===
Membership of the Committee is as follows:

Member	Party	Constituency
Caroline Nokes MP (Chair)	Conservative	Romsey and Southampton North
Calvin Bailey MP	Labour	Leyton and Wanstead
Juliet Campbell MP	Labour	Broxtowe
Samantha Dixon MP	Labour	Chester North and Neston
Sarah Edwards MP	Labour	Tamworth
Kirith Entwistle MP	Labour	Bolton North East
Ashley Fox MP	Conservative	Bridgwater
Mike Martin MP	Liberal Democrats	Tunbridge Wells
Susan Murray MP	Liberal Democrats	Mid Dunbartonshire
Tom Rutland MP	Labour	East Worthing and Shoreham
Oliver Ryan MP	Independent (elected as Labour)	Burnley

=== 2019–2024 Parliament ===
As of June 2023 the members of the committee are:

Member	Party	Constituency
Dean Russell MP (Chair)	Conservative	Watford
Simon Baynes MP	Conservative	Clwyd South
Sarah Champion MP	Labour	Rotherham
Theo Clarke MP	Conservative	Stafford
Chris Evans MP	Labour and Co-op	Islwyn
Patrick Grady MP	SNP	Glasgow North
Sally-Ann Hart MP	Conservative	Hastings and Rye
Kim Johnson MP	Labour	Liverpool Riverside
Barbara Keeley MP	Labour	Worsley and Eccles South
Gagan Mohindra MP	Conservative	South West Hertfordshire
Caroline Nokes MP	Conservative	Romsey and Southampton North
