= European Code of Good Administrative Behaviour =

2001 European Parliament resolution

The European Code of Good Administrative Behaviour
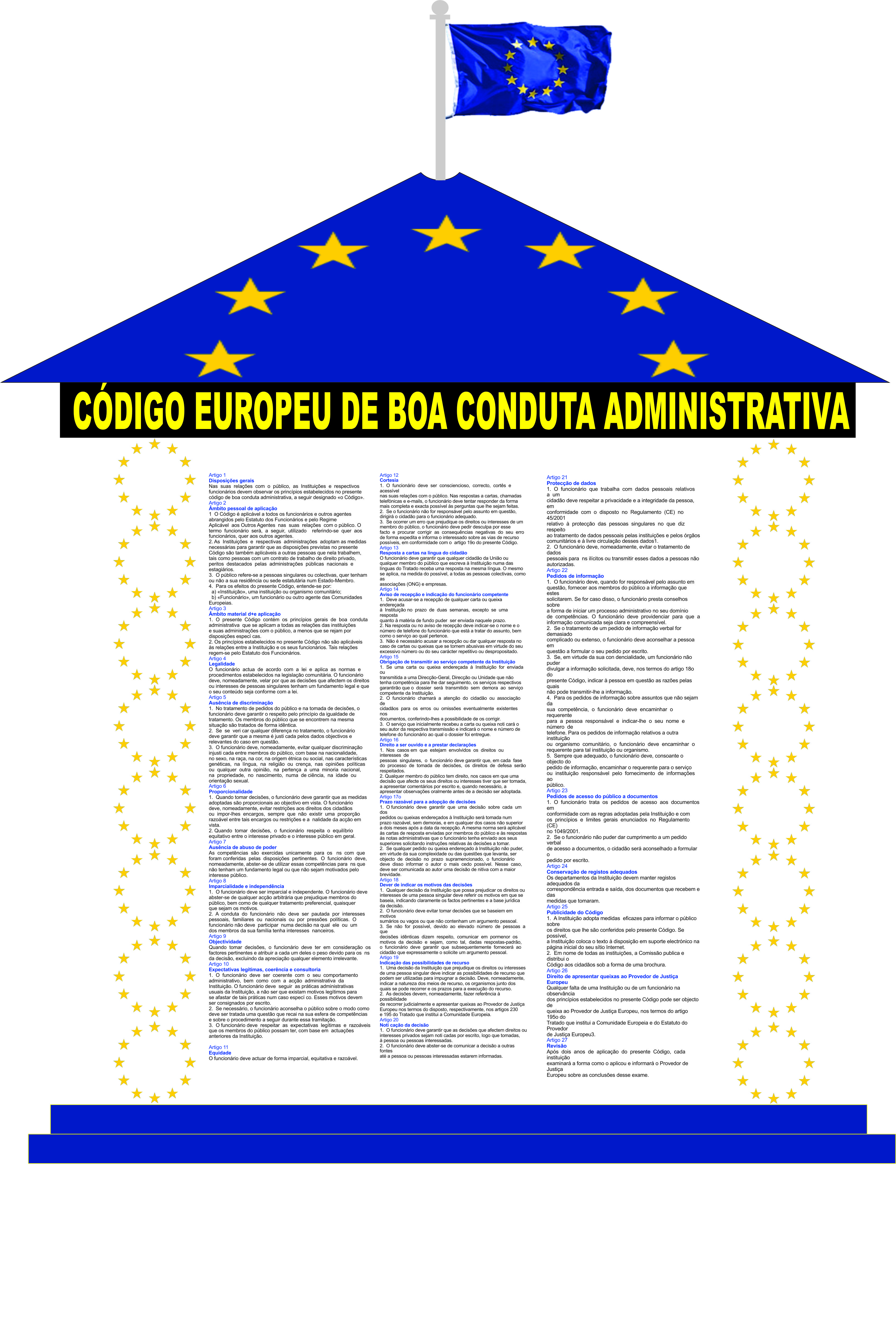
- Portico with the code's articles (in Portuguese)
- Created: 2001
- Ratified: 6 September 2001
- Author: European Parliament
- Signatories: Constituents of the European Parliament
- Purpose: Definition of ethical values in the public service of the European Union

The European Code of Good Administrative Behaviour is a resolution of the European Parliament whose literature is related to the Staff Regulations of the European Communities.

== History ==
The code creation of discussion was born in 1998 on a proposal by Roy Perry, was approved on 6 September 2001, by the European Parliament.

=== Legal foundation ===
The code is grounded in Article 41 of the EU Charter of Fundamental Rights.

=== Legal goal ===
The code is guided in the generalization of an administrative and ethical awareness that the European civil service should develop in their work within the institutions and bodies of the European Union. Its implementation and supervision rests with the European Ombudsman.

== See also ==
- Charter of Fundamental Rights of the European Union, European Union.
- Staff Regulations of the European Communities
