= Caroline Nokes =

British politician (born 1972)

The Right Honourable Caroline Nokes MP
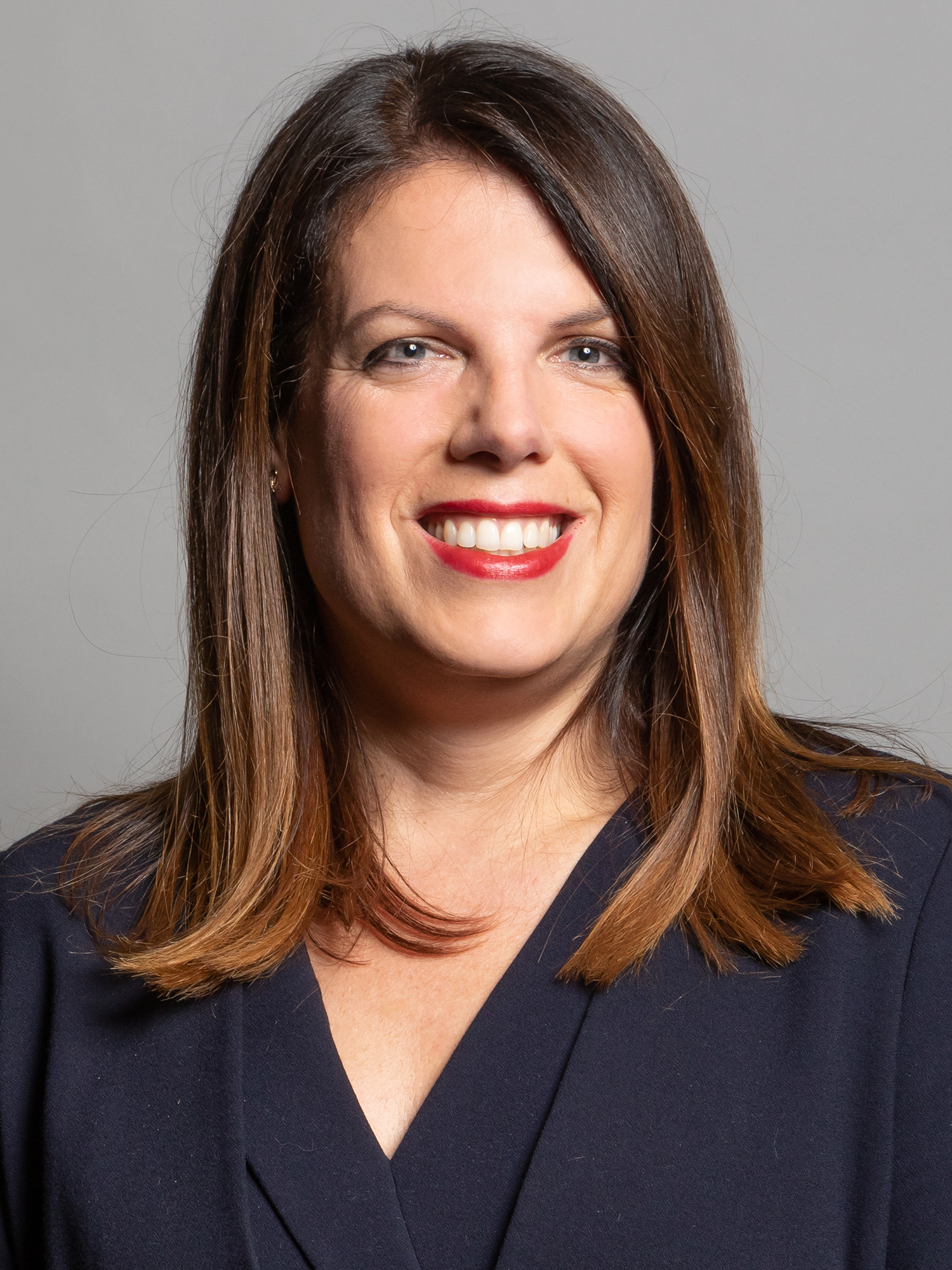
- Official portrait, 2020

Deputy Speaker of the House of Commons Second Deputy Chair of Ways and Means
- Incumbent
- Assumed office 23 July 2024
- Speaker: Lindsay Hoyle
- Preceded by: Nigel Evans

Chair of the Women and Equalities Committee
- In office 29 January 2020 – 30 May 2024
- Preceded by: Maria Miller
- Succeeded by: Sarah Owen

Minister of State for Immigration
- In office 8 January 2018 – 24 July 2019
- Prime Minister: Theresa May
- Preceded by: Brandon Lewis
- Succeeded by: Seema Kennedy

Parliamentary Secretary for the Cabinet Office
- In office 14 June 2017 – 8 January 2018
- Prime Minister: Theresa May
- Preceded by: Dawn Butler (Note: Office vacant between 11 May 2010 and 14 June 2017.)
- Succeeded by: Oliver Dowden

Parliamentary Under-Secretary of State for Welfare Delivery
- In office 17 July 2016 – 14 June 2017
- Prime Minister: Theresa May
- Preceded by: Shailesh Vara
- Succeeded by: Caroline Dinenage

Chair of the Advisory Committee on Works of Art
- In office 8 July 2015 – 17 July 2016
- Preceded by: Frank Doran
- Succeeded by: Alison McGovern

Member of Parliament for Romsey and Southampton North
- Incumbent
- Assumed office 6 May 2010
- Preceded by: Sandra Gidley
- Majority: 2,191 (4.4%)

Personal details
- Born: Caroline Fiona Ellen Perry; 26 June 1972 (age 54) Lyndhurst, Hampshire, England
- Party: Conservative
- Spouse: Marc Nokes (m. 1995; div. 2012)
- Children: 1
- Education: University of Sussex (BA)
- Website: www.carolinenokes.com

Caroline Fiona Ellen Nokes (née Perry; born 26 June 1972) is a British Conservative Party politician who has been the Member of Parliament (MP) for Romsey and Southampton North since 2010.

From 2014 to 2015 she was a Parliamentary Private Secretary to Mark Harper at the Department for Work and Pensions. Nokes served in Theresa May's government as Parliamentary Under-Secretary of State for Welfare Delivery at the Department for Work and Pensions from 2016 to 2017, Parliamentary Secretary for the Cabinet Office from 2017 to 2018, and as Minister of State for Immigration at the Home Office from January 2018 to July 2019.

== Early life and career ==
Caroline Nokes was born on 26 June 1972 at Lyndhurst Hospital in Lyndhurst, and raised in West Wellow, a village in Hampshire. Her father is Roy Perry, a former Conservative Member of the European Parliament (MEP) for the Wight and Hampshire South constituency. Nokes was educated at The Romsey School, La Sagesse Convent in Romsey and then Peter Symonds' College, Winchester, before reading politics at the University of Sussex from 1991 to 1994.

After her graduation Nokes became a policy adviser to her father, in his role as an MEP. Prior to her election she was chief executive of the National Pony Society, an animal welfare charity promoting and supporting the traditional native breeds of ponies through education, training and competition.

Nokes was a member of Test Valley Borough Council from 1999 until 2010, representing the Romsey Extra ward, and for some time was responsible for the leisure portfolio. She stood down as a councillor when she was elected to parliament in May 2010.

== Parliamentary career ==
At the 2001 general election, Nokes stood unsuccessfully as the Conservative parliamentary candidate for the Southampton Itchen constituency, where she finished second with 27.4% of the vote behind the incumbent Labour Party MP John Denham.

Nokes also stood unsuccessfully for the Romsey constituency at the 2005 general election, where she finished second with 44.4% of the vote behind the incumbent Liberal Democrat MP Sandra Gidley.

Nokes was elected at the 2010 general election as the Member of Parliament (MP) for the new constituency of Romsey and Southampton North, defeating Liberal Democrat MP Sandra Gidley who had previously represented the Romsey constituency. She was elected with 49.7% of the vote and a majority of 4,156.

In January 2011, Nokes introduced her first piece of legislation, the Consumer Protection Bill.

In July 2014, Nokes became a Parliamentary Private Secretary at the Department for Work and Pensions, as an aide to the minister with responsibility for disabled people.

At the 2015 general election, Nokes was re-elected with an increased vote share of 54.4% and an increased majority of 17,712. She was re-elected at the snap 2017 general election with an increased vote share of 57.1% and an increased majority of 18,006, and re-elected at the 2019 general election with a decreased vote share of 54.2% and a decreased majority of 10,872. At the 2024 general election, Nokes was again re-elected, with a decreased vote share of 39.8% and a decreased majority of 2,191.

=== Parliamentary select committees and all-party groups ===
Nokes was from 2010 to March 2015 a member of two parliamentary select committees, the Environmental Audit Select Committee, and the Education Select Committee. She is a member of a parliamentary group for equine welfare. From 2012 to 2016 Nokes was an officer of the All-Party Parliamentary Group (APPG) on Body Image.

=== Parliamentary bill committees ===
Nokes sat on the Scrap Metal Dealers Bill Committee from 2012-2013, and in the same year was also a member of the Justice and Security Bill Committee. She also sat on the Children and Families Bill Committee which scrutinises a bill designed to improve legislation affecting fostered and adopted children, children in care, children with Special Educational Needs, and the family justice system. Nokes was also a member of the Deregulation Bill Committee and the Modern Slavery Bill Committee, a subject in which she had previously expressed a constituency interest and on which she had questioned the government.

In February 2014, Nokes criticised a House of Lords amendment to the Children and Families Bill which she said "watered down" the commitment to shared parenting, and spoke against the amendment in the House of Commons, arguing that shared parenting arrangements were in the best interests of children.

=== Equatorial Guinea ===
In August 2011, Nokes joined a parliamentary delegation to Equatorial Guinea which had Foreign Office support. The delegation met with the country's Prime Minister, whom the delegation challenged about the country's human rights record. Nokes went on to call for the country's president to instigate proper democracy and permit press freedom.

=== Home Office Minister of State ===
In January 2018, Nokes was appointed Minister of State for Immigration at the Home Office, a Cabinet position. Accordingly, she was appointed to the Privy Council. She was criticised by the Northern Ireland Affairs Select Committee after admitting she had not read the Good Friday Agreement. She was removed by new Prime Minister Boris Johnson on 25 July 2019.

=== Removal and restoration of whip ===
Nokes was opposed to Brexit prior to the 2016 EU membership referendum. Nokes had the Conservative whip removed on 3 September 2019, after she voted against the party to extend the deadline for Britain to exit the European Union and prevent a no-deal Brexit, stating that her constituents in Romsey and Southampton North would be worse off under a no-deal Brexit.

She was among 10 MPs who had the whip restored on 29 October 2019.

=== Chair of the Women and Equalities Select Committee ===
On 29 January 2020, Nokes was elected to the position of chair of the Women and Equalities Committee, succeeding Maria Miller. In May 2021, alongside celebrities and other public figures, Nokes was a signatory to an open letter supporting a campaign by Stylist magazine aimed at "ending male violence against women and girls". In September 2023, during the Laurence Fox GB News scandal, Nokes called for GB News to be closed down in view of the misogynistic comments that had been broadcast.

=== Same-sex marriage ===
Nokes has stated she was "broadly supportive" of same-sex marriage, provided that religious organisations were not forced to act against their theology. In February 2013, she cited her support for stable and secure relationships, both gay and straight, but also referenced her previous pledge to Christians, and voted against the Marriage (Same Sex Couples) Bill at Second Reading, saying she was "not convinced the safeguards sought by the Church of England have been guaranteed".

=== Planning policy ===
Nokes in 2024

Nokes was a member of the Southern Area Planning Committee on Test Valley Borough Council for 10 years and was a critic of a number of developments in the Test Valley area, in particular where plans to develop were not subject to a proper environmental survey. She is a regular speaker on planning issues, advocate for greater planning controls to protect green field spaces, and to better manage planning in rural areas. Nokes criticised the National Planning Policy Framework, saying "communities need to be treated differently. Good quality affordable housing is of course the key issue, but so is sympathetic development and ensuring the rural economy can grow through planning regulations which do not disadvantage rural business". She criticised the Government for "not delivering localism" and said the most important aspect of planning "is the voice of the local resident".

=== Deputy Speakership ===
Nokes was elected Second Deputy Chairman of Ways and Means (Deputy Speaker) 23 July 2024.

== Fathers4Justice ==
In April 2010, Fathers4Justice members backed Nokes as the Conservatives had supported their campaign for change to family law, promising legislation if they won the 2010 general election. Following the formation of the coalition, government policy did not fully reflect the position of Fathers4Justice, and the group criticised the new government. In March 2013, when Nokes announced she would sit on the committee responsible for scrutinising the bill, Fathers4Justice called upon her to resign.

Following many abusive tweets directed at Nokes, Twitter shut down the accounts of Fathers4Justice and its leader Matt O'Connor, which F4J saw as "political censorship". The local media reported the group had been engaged in a "witch hunt" against Nokes, who said she had "repeatedly offered to help Fathers4Justice with the tabling of amendments for the Children and Families Act, but none were forthcoming, just comments, which Twitter agreed constituted abuse and harassment. I am aware other political parties and individuals have also complained to Twitter and indeed to the police". She also said: "I remain committed to improvements to the family justice system, which the Children and Families Bill goes some way towards delivering, and it is a pity F4J chose not to engage constructively with the deliberations of the Bill Committee".

In October 2014, The Independent reported allegations that the group might have put a tracking device on Nokes's car, and a security consultant said he had been approached by Matt O'Connor's wife Nadine O'Connor about placing the MP under surveillance. Police were said to regard the group as a "fixated threat" which led to security enhancements at Nokes's home. When O'Connor confronted the Hampshire Police and Crime Commissioner making allegations about Nokes, the commissioner said O'Connor had "made things up". A person claiming to be a supporter of the group later sent Nokes a Facebook message which stated the wish that Nokes be "violently raped", and stated "there are a lot of people who wish you serious harm, torture and death. Watch your back".

At the Central London County Court at the Royal Courts of Justice in October 2014, the judge refused to grant the injunction because of "a total absence of evidence", with the judge criticising the O'Connors for seeking to prejudice the court by making "generalised assertions" and concluding "there's no sufficient evidence before me to support a finding that there's even an arguable case for a claim for harassment." The O'Connors were ordered to pay costs.

== Personal life ==
She married Marc Nokes in 1995 and the couple had a daughter. In 2010 it was reported that she had been having an affair with a Conservative councillor. Nokes divorced in 2012.

On 15 November 2021, Nokes accused Stanley Johnson, the father of then prime minister Boris Johnson, of inappropriately touching her at the Conservative Party conference in Blackpool in 2003. Stanley Johnson said that he had "no recollection of Caroline Nokes at all".

=== Threatening emails ===
In June 2024, Liam McCarthy, who had pleaded guilty to harassment, was sentenced to seven months in prison for sending threatening emails to several people including Nokes.

Parliament of the United Kingdom
Preceded by Sandra Gidley	Member of Parliament for Romsey and Southampton North; 2010–present	Incumbent
Preceded by Nigel Evans	Second Deputy Chair of Ways and Means; 2024–present	Incumbent
