= Little Hatherden =

Village in Hampshire, England

Coordinates: 51.251015°N 1.507825°W

- Location within Hampshire
- OS grid reference: SU3444750320
- Civil parish: Hatherden
- District: Test Valley
- Shire county: Hampshire
- Region: South East
- Country: England
- Sovereign state: United Kingdom
- Post town: ANDOVER
- Postcode district: SP11
- Dialling code: 01264
- Police: Hampshire and Isle of Wight
- Fire: Hampshire and Isle of Wight
- Ambulance: South Central
- UK Parliament: North West Hampshire

Little Hatherden is a small village in the civil parish of Hatherden in the Test Valley district of Hampshire, England. It is in the civil parish of Tangley. Its nearest town is Andover, which lies approximately 4 miles (6.3 km) south from the village.

An unusual registered charity is located in the village: a goat animal therapy centre, called The Three Bees Project.

The historic Benchmark Cottage is located in the village.
