= 2013 Hampshire County Council election =

2013 UK local government election

- 2 May 2013

All 78 seats to Hampshire County Council 40 seats needed for a majority
	First party	Second party
Party	Conservative	Liberal Democrats
Seats won	45	17
Seat change	▼6	▼7
Popular vote	124,886	72,273
Percentage	37.51%	21.71%
Swing	▼10.21pp	▼11.18pp
	Third party	Fourth party
Party	UKIP	Labour
Seats won	10	4
Seat change	▲10	▲3
Popular vote	81,930	35,228
Percentage	24.61%	10.58%
Swing	▲18.69pp	▲3.51pp
- Map showing the results of the 2013 Hampshire County Council election. Striped electoral divisions have mixed representation.
Council control before election
Conservative
Council control after election
Conservative

An election to Hampshire County Council took place on 2 May 2013 as part of the 2013 United Kingdom local elections. 78 councillors were elected from 75 electoral divisions, which returned either one or two county councillors each by first-past-the-post voting for a four-year term of office. The electoral divisions were the same as those of the previous election in 2009. No elections were held in Portsmouth and Southampton, which are unitary authorities outside the area covered by the County Council. The election saw the Conservative Party retain overall control of the council, with a reduced majority of five councillors.

All locally registered electors (British, Irish, Commonwealth and European Union citizens) who were aged 18 or over on Thursday 2 May 2013 were entitled to vote in the local elections. Those who were temporarily away from their ordinary address (for example, away working, on holiday, in student accommodation or in hospital) were also entitled to vote in the local elections, although those who had moved abroad and registered as overseas electors cannot vote in the local elections. It is possible to register to vote at more than one address (such as a university student who had a term-time address and lives at home during holidays) at the discretion of the local Electoral Register Office, but it remains an offence to vote more than once in the same local government election.

== Summary ==
The elections saw the Conservative Party retain overall control of the council, though with their majority reduced from 24 seats to five. The largest opposition party continued to be the Liberal Democrats, despite a net loss of seven seats. Having been reduced to just one seat in the previous election, the Labour Party gained three more seats including two which had been lost in 2009. The election saw an electoral breakthrough by the UK Independence Party, who won their first seats on the council and became the third-largest party.

The local Community Campaign in Hart successfully defended its councillor's seat in Church Crookham and Ewshot, which was the only seat it fought. An independent candidate gained a seat in Lymington from the Conservatives. Alan Weeks, the sole Green Party incumbent who had defected from the Liberal Democrats, lost his Totton North seat to UKIP.

== Candidates ==
The Conservatives and Labour both obtained local nominations for all divisions, while UKIP had no candidates in six divisions and the Liberal Democrats had no candidate in one. The Green Party fielded 30 candidates, six short of half of the council divisions. The next highest total share of votes was won by the six independent candidates. None of the other parties, local or national achieved more than 0.71% of the vote.

== Results ==
Hampshire County Council election, 2013
Party	Seats	Gains	Losses	Net gain/loss	Seats %	Votes %	Votes	+/−
Conservative	45	3	9	−6	57.69	37.51	124,886	−10.21
Liberal Democrats	17	1	8	−7	21.79	21.71	72,273	−11.18
UKIP	10	10	0	+10	12.82	24.61	81,930	+18.69
Labour	4	3	0	+3	5.13	10.58	35,228 (Note: Includes Labour Co-op)	+3.51
Independent	1	1	0	+1	1.28	1.89	6,292 (Note: Includes 'No Party')	−0.46
CCH	1	0	0	0	1.28	0.71	2,367	−0.24
Green	0	0	1	−1	0.00	2.78	9,247	+1.06
BNP	0	0	0	0	0.00	0.09	283	−0.25
Christian	0	0	0	0	0.00	0.06	191	N/A
TUSC	0	0	0	0	0.00	0.04	117	N/A
Monster Raving Loony	0	0	0	0	0.00	0.03	92	N/A
English Democrat	0	0	0	0	0.00	0.00	0 (Note: No candidates stood in 2013)	−1.04

== Results by electoral division ==
Hampshire County Council is divided into 11 districts, which are split further into electoral divisions.

=== Basingstoke and Deane (10 seats) ===
Basingstoke and Deane

Basingstoke Central
Party	Candidate	Votes	%	±%
Labour	Criss Connor	1408	36.83	
UKIP	Duncan Stone	998	26.11	
Liberal Democrats	John Shaw	729	19.07	
Conservative	Laura Edwards	688	18.00	
Majority				
Turnout				
Labour gain from Liberal Democrats		Swing		

Basingstoke North
Party	Candidate	Votes	%	±%
Labour	Jane Frankum	1813	54.54	
UKIP	Michael Tatam	839	25.24	
Conservative	John Holley	482	14.50	
Liberal Democrats	Doris Jones	190	5.72	
Majority				
Turnout				
Labour hold		Swing		

Basingstoke North West
Party	Candidate	Votes	%	±%
Conservative	Stephen Reid	1186	37.98	
Labour	Sean Keating	1037	33.21	
UKIP	Harold Robinson	794	25.42	
Liberal Democrats	Richard Whitechurch	106	3.39	
Majority				
Turnout				
Conservative hold		Swing		

Basingstoke South East
Party	Candidate	Votes	%	±%
Liberal Democrats	Brian Gurden	1278	34.66	
UKIP	David Watson	984	26.69	
Labour	David Eyre	823	22.32	
Conservative	Ian Smith	602	16.33	
Majority				
Turnout				
Liberal Democrats hold		Swing		

Basingstoke South West
Party	Candidate	Votes	%	±%
Conservative	Rita Burgess	1882	49.06	
UKIP	Philip Heath	1127	29.38	
Labour	Paul Frankum	508	13.24	
Liberal Democrats	Madeline Hussey	319	8.32	
Majority				
Turnout				
Conservative hold		Swing		

Calleva and Kingsclere
Party	Candidate	Votes	%	±%
Conservative	Keith Chapman	2442	57.91	
UKIP	Stan Oram	918	21.77	
Labour	John Rodway	479	11.36	
Liberal Democrats	Janice Spalding	378	8.96	
Majority				
Turnout				
Conservative hold		Swing		

Candovers
Party	Candidate	Votes	%	±%
Conservative	Anna McNair Scott	1674	39.57	
UKIP	Peter Johnson	1008	23.82	
Independent	Ian Tilbury	1002	23.68	
Labour	Yegor Ryazanov	289	6.83	
Liberal Democrats	Jeff Teagle	258	6.10	
Majority				
Turnout				
Conservative hold		Swing		

Loddon
Party	Candidate	Votes	%	±%
Conservative	Elaine Still	2120	49.56	
UKIP	Alan Stone	1114	26.04	
Independent	Genni Touzin	389	9.09	
Labour	George Severs	379	8.86	
Liberal Democrats	Stephen Day	276	6.45	
Majority				
Turnout				
Conservative hold		Swing		

Tadley and Baughurst
Party	Candidate	Votes	%	±%
Liberal Democrats	Warwick Lovegrove	1326	36.39	
Conservative	Marilyn Tucker	1163	31.92	
UKIP	Stephen West	924	25.36	
Labour	Stephen Rothman	231	6.34	
Majority				
Turnout				
Liberal Democrats gain from Conservative		Swing		

Whitchurch and Clere
Party	Candidate	Votes	%	±%
Conservative	Tom Thacker	1844	49.20	
UKIP	George Garton	865	23.08	
Liberal Democrats	Steven Neilson	704	18.78	
Labour	David Foden	335	8.94	
Majority				
Turnout				
Conservative hold		Swing		

=== East Hampshire (7 seats) ===
East Hampshire

Alton Rural
Party	Candidate	Votes	%	±%
Conservative	Mark Kemp-Gee	2762	56.04	
UKIP	Rigby Andrews	1188	24.10	
Liberal Democrats	Maureen Comber	550	11.16	
Labour	Jan Treacher	429	8.70	
Majority				
Turnout		4929	35.37	−8.00
Conservative hold		Swing		

Alton Town
Party	Candidate	Votes	%	±%
Conservative	Andrew Joy	1715	43.11	
UKIP	Andrew Walters	955	24.01	
Liberal Democrats	Diane McKay	799	20.09	
Labour	Barbara Burfoot	509	12.80	
Majority				
Turnout		3978	29.64	−5.36
Conservative hold		Swing		

Bordon, Whitehill and Lindford
Party	Candidate	Votes	%	±%
Liberal Democrats	Adam Carew	1141	43.20	
UKIP	Don Jerrard	802	30.37	
Conservative	Ken Carter	501	18.97	
Labour	Keith Budden	197	7.46	
Majority				
Turnout		2641	22.78	−4.99
Liberal Democrats hold		Swing		

Catherington
Party	Candidate	Votes	%	±%
Conservative	Marge Harvey	1725	43.49%	
UKIP	David Alexander	964	24.31%	
Liberal Democrats	Steve Protheroe	849	21.41%	
Labour	Katie Green	253	6.38%	
Green	Caroline Footman	175	4.41%	
Majority				
Turnout		3966	31.61	−9.91
Conservative gain from Liberal Democrats		Swing		

Headley
Party	Candidate	Votes	%	±%
Conservative	Ferris Cowper	2120	57.04	
UKIP	Derrick Ismay	893	24.02	
Liberal Democrats	Michael Croucher	371	9.98	
Labour	John Tough	333	8.96	
Majority				
Turnout		3717	28.49	−6.80
Conservative hold		Swing		

Petersfield Butser
Party	Candidate	Votes	%	±%
Conservative	John West	1618	38.71	
UKIP	Steve Marston	940	22.49	
Liberal Democrats	Byron Grainger-Jones	877	20.98	
Labour	Bill Organ	386	9.23	
Green	Bill Enstone	359	8.59	
Majority				
Turnout		4180	31.56	−7.53
Conservative hold		Swing		

Petersfield Hangers
Party	Candidate	Votes	%	±%
Conservative	Vaughan Clarke	2150	53.05	
UKIP	Stephen Coles	775	19.12	
Liberal Democrats	Roger Mullenger	465	11.47	
Labour Co-op	Howard Linsley	373	9.20	
Green	Adam Harper	290	7.16	
Majority				
Turnout		4053	34.59	−6.90
Conservative hold		Swing		

=== Eastleigh (7 seats) ===
Eastleigh

Bishopstoke and Fair Oak
Party	Candidate	Votes	%	±%
UKIP	Martin Lyon	1824	40.15	25.71
Liberal Democrats	Angela Roling	1657	36.47	−10.63
Conservative	Colin Atterbury	656	14.44	−12.96
Labour	Mary Shephard	406	8.94	1.71
Majority		167	3.68	
Turnout		4543	33.64	−3.48
UKIP gain from Liberal Democrats		Swing		

Botley and Hedge End
Party	Candidate	Votes	%	±%
Liberal Democrats	Rupert Kyrle	1806	36.01	−12.07
UKIP	Steve Robinson-Grindey	1652	32.94	22.21
Conservative	Ian Bennett	1263	25.18	−13.3
Labour	Andrew Helps	294	5.86	3.15
Majority		154	3.07	
Turnout		5015	34.61	−9.12
Liberal Democrats hold		Swing		

Chandler’s Ford
Party	Candidate	Votes	%	±%
Conservative	Colin Davidovitz	1919	39.08	−12.21
Liberal Democrats	James Duguid	1557	31.7	−2.88
UKIP	John Edwards	1073	21.85	11.57
Labour	Beryl Addison	238	4.85	0.99
Green	Joe Cox	124	2.52	2.52
Majority		362	7.37	−9.34
Turnout		4911	40.17	−6.6
Conservative hold		Swing		

Eastleigh East
Party	Candidate	Votes	%	±%
UKIP	Andy Moore	1609	38.93	+18.98
Liberal Democrats	Christopher Thomas	1440	34.84	−10.56
Conservative	Michael Read	454	10.98	−12.26
Labour	Chris Gilkes	436	10.55	−0.86
Green	Angela Cotton	138	3.34	+3.34
Christian	Kevin Milburn	56	1.35	+1.35
Majority		169	4.09	
Turnout		4133	32.06	−0.90
UKIP gain from Liberal Democrats		Swing		

Eastleigh West
Party	Candidate	Votes	%	±%
UKIP	Chris Greenwood	1604	35.38	18.9
Liberal Democrats	Alan Broadhurst	1533	33.82	−12.38
Conservative	Andy Milligan	694	14.54	−11.28
Labour	James Penders	579	12.77	1.28
Green	Stuart Jebbitt	107	2.36	2.36
Monster Raving Loony	Hopping Mad Hog	29	0.64	0.64
TUSC	Ania Waterman	22	0.49	0.49
Majority		71	1.57	
Turnout		4533	29.83	−2.43
UKIP gain from Liberal Democrats		Swing		

Hamble
Party	Candidate	Votes	%	±%
Liberal Democrats	Keith House	1941	42.51	−10.99
UKIP	Chris Martin	1402	30.71	17.18
Conservative	Elizabeth Lear	969	21.22	−8.3
Labour	Chris Rogers	254	5.56	2.11
Majority		539	11.8	
Turnout		4566	31.44	−6.85
Liberal Democrats hold		Swing		

West End and Hedge End Grange Park
Party	Candidate	Votes	%	±%
Liberal Democrats	Bruce Tennent	1520	40.43	−11.97
UKIP	Sarah Lyon	1261	33.54	21.65
Conservative	Paul Redding	742	19.73	−11.37
Labour	Pete Luffman	237	6.3	1.69
Majority		259	6.89	
Turnout		3760	26.28	−8.09
Liberal Democrats hold		Swing		

=== Fareham (7 seats) ===
Fareham

Fareham Crofton
Party	Candidate	Votes	%	±%
UKIP	Christopher Wood	2691	50.39	+42.26
Conservative	Tim Knight	1764	33.03	−25.44
Liberal Democrats	Jim Forrest	697	13.05	−11.39
Labour	Leslie Ricketts	188	3.52	+0.29
Majority		927	17.36	
Turnout		5340	45.41	−0.95
UKIP gain from Conservative		Swing	+33.85	

Fareham Portchester
Party	Candidate	Votes	%	±%
Liberal Democrats	Roger Price	2410	55.92	
Conservative	Raymond Ellis	1145	26.57	
Labour	Stuart Rose	430	9.98	
Green	John Vivian	325	7.54	
Majority				
Turnout		4310	29.53	−11.75
Liberal Democrats hold		Swing		

Fareham Sarisbury
Party	Candidate	Votes	%	±%
Conservative	Sean Woodward	1957	70.29	
Labour	Angela Carr	434	15.59	
Liberal Democrats	Mary Holliday-Bishop	393	14.12	
Majority				
Turnout		2784	23.84	−13.22
Conservative hold		Swing		

Fareham Titchfield
Party	Candidate	Votes	%	±%
Conservative	Geoffrey Hockley	1602	51.33	
Independent	Jack Englefield	917	29.38	
Labour	Michael Prior	347	11.12	
Liberal Democrats	Sue Hardie	255	8.17	
Majority				
Turnout		3121	26.53	−13.86
Conservative hold		Swing		

Fareham Town (2)
Party	Candidate	Votes	%	±%
Conservative	Peter Latham	2802	16.88	
Conservative	George Ringrow	2686	16.18	
UKIP	Bob Ingram	2517	15.16	
UKIP	David Whittingham	2207	13.30'	
Liberal Democrats	Paul Whittle	2028	12.22	
Liberal Democrats	David Norris	1933	11.65	
Labour	James Carr	804	4.84	
Labour	Richard Ryan	737	4.44	
Green	Dilys Harrison	470	2.83	
Green	David Harrison	415	2.50	
Turnout		8692	30.78	−8.96
Conservative hold		Swing		
Conservative hold		Swing		

Fareham Warsash
Party	Candidate	Votes	%	±%
Conservative	Keith Evans	2041	60.05	
UKIP	David Nightingale	731	21.51	
Labour	Andrew Mooney	250	7.36	
Green	Miles Grindey	216	6.35	
Liberal Democrats	Craig Lewis	161	4.74	
Majority				
Turnout		3399	30.27	−10.79
Conservative hold		Swing		

=== Gosport (5 seats) ===
Gosport

Bridgemary
Party	Candidate	Votes	%	±%
Labour	Shaun Cully	1358	39.15	
Conservative	Mike Geddes	1035	29.84	
UKIP	Patrick Bergin	927	26.72	
Liberal Democrats	Stephen Pinder	117	3.37	
BNP	Christopher Caffin	32	0.92	
Majority				
Turnout		3469	27.64	−4.07
Labour gain from Conservative		Swing		

Hardway
Party	Candidate	Votes	%	±%
Liberal Democrats	Peter Chegwyn	1220	42.69	
Conservative	Debbie Grant	941	32.93	
UKIP	Malik Azam	433	15.15	
Labour	Alan Durrant	264	9.24	
Majority				
Turnout		2858	25.21	−5.16
Liberal Democrats hold		Swing		

Lee
Party	Candidate	Votes	%	±%
Conservative	Graham Burgess	1994	60.01	
UKIP	Curtis Sinclair	760	22.87	
Labour	Jill Whitcher	293	8.82	
Liberal Democrats	Paul Keeley	158	4.75	
Green	Graham Smith	118	3.55	
Majority				
Turnout		3323	24.74	−4.94
Conservative hold		Swing		

Leesland and Town (2)
Party	Candidate	Votes	%	±%
Conservative	Peter Edgar	3396	28.97	
Conservative	Christopher Carter	2795	23.84	
UKIP	Tim Apps	2168	18.50	
Labour	Micheal Madgwick	829	7.07	
Liberal Democrats	Robert Hylands	796	6.79	
Liberal Democrats	Austin Hicks	771	6.58	
Green	Terry Mitchell	509	4.34	
BNP	Gavin Miller	251	2.14	
Labour	John Train	207	1.77	
Turnout		6682	26.42	−8.13
Conservative hold		Swing		
Conservative hold		Swing		

=== Hart (5 seats) ===
Hart

Church Crookham and Ewshot
Party	Candidate	Votes	%	±%
CCH	John Bennison	2367	54.48	
Conservative	Wallace Vincent	1167	26.86	
UKIP	Nigel Johnson	579	13.33	
Labour	Ruth Williams	232	5.34	
Majority				
Turnout		4345	32.54	−12.12
CCH hold		Swing		

Fleet
Party	Candidate	Votes	%	±%
Conservative	Sharyn Wheale	2309	44.52	
Independent	Alan Oliver	1757	33.88	
UKIP	Christine Forrester	629	12.13	
Liberal Democrats	Neil Walton	234	4.51	
Labour	Vera Nabbs	194	3.74	
Monster Raving Loony	Howling Laud Hope	63	1.21	
Majority				
Turnout		5186	32.93	−6.43
Conservative hold		Swing		

Hartley Wintney, Eversley and Yateley West
Party	Candidate	Votes	%	±%
Liberal Democrats	David Simpson	2014	42.73	
Conservative	Tim Southern	1624	34.46	
UKIP	John Howe	833	17.67	
Labour	Joyce Still	242	5.13	
Majority				
Turnout		4713	33.64	−8.10
Liberal Democrats hold		Swing		

Odiham
Party	Candidate	Votes	%	±%
Conservative	Jonathan Glen	2156	61.42	
UKIP	Ann Williams	770	21.94	
Liberal Democrats	Graham Cockarill	292	8.32	
Labour	John Davies	292	8.32	
Majority				
Turnout		3510	25.91	−13.21
Conservative hold		Swing		

Yateley East, Blackwater and Ancells
Party	Candidate	Votes	%	±%
Liberal Democrats	Adrian Collett	2178	58.55	
Conservative	Shawn Dickens	733	19.70	
UKIP	Stanley Tennison	598	16.08	
Labour Co-op	Les Lawrie	211	5.67	
Majority				
Turnout		3720	27.11	−8.86
Liberal Democrats hold		Swing		

=== Havant (7 seats) ===
Havant

Bedhampton and Leigh Park (2)
Party	Candidate	Votes	%	±%
UKIP	Ray Finch	1760	15.19	
Conservative	Liz Fairhurst	1655	14.29	
UKIP	Stephen Harris	1629	14.06	
Liberal Democrats	Ann Brown	1488	12.85	
Conservative	Diana Patrick	1454	12.55	
Liberal Democrats	Faith Ponsonby	1322	11.41	
Labour	Anthony Berry	1006	8.69	
Labour	Simon Vassallo	755	6.69	
Green	Martin Lewis	326	2.81	
No Party	Christopher Gould	168	1.45	
Turnout		6105	22.63	−5.92
UKIP gain from Liberal Democrats		Swing		
Conservative hold		Swing		

Cowplain and Hart Plain
Party	Candidate	Votes	%	±%
Conservative	David Keast	1377	45.09	
UKIP	Alex Bowers	938	30.71	
Labour	Ken Monks	372	12.18	
Liberal Democrats	Terry Port	193	6.32	
Green	Bruce Holman	174	5.70	
Majority				
Turnout		3054	25.22	−8.02
Conservative hold		Swing		

Emsworth and St. Faiths
Party	Candidate	Votes	%	±%
Conservative	Ray Bolton	2202	42.72	
UKIP	Ian Reddoch	1167	22.64	
Green	Tim Dawes	778	15.10	
Labour	Christine Armitage	636	12.34	
Liberal Democrats	Roisin Miller	371	7.20	
Majority				
Turnout		5154	34.01	−11.13
Conservative hold		Swing		

Hayling Island
Party	Candidate	Votes	%	±%
Conservative	Frank Pearce	1921	42.90	
UKIP	John Perry	1618	36.13	
Labour	Michael Clarke	482	10.76	
Green	Paul Valentine	216	4.82	
Liberal Democrats	Anne Martin	199	4.44	
No Party	Gene Cann	42	0.94	
Majority				
Turnout		4478	31.11	−7.73
Conservative hold		Swing		

Purbrook and Stakes South
Party	Candidate	Votes	%	±%
Conservative	Robin McIntosh	1051	37.39	
UKIP	Gary Kerrin	1003	35.68	
Labour	Munazza Faiz	507	18.04	
Liberal Democrats	Ann Bazley	250	8.89	
Majority				
Turnout		2811	22.41	−8.06
Conservative hold		Swing		

Waterloo and Stakes North
Party	Candidate	Votes	%	±%
Conservative	Ann Briggs	1423	42.57	
UKIP	William Farnham	1085	32.46	
Labour	Howard Sherlock	393	11.76	
Liberal Democrats	Elaine Woodard	223	6.67	
Green	Owen Plunkett	219	6.55	
Majority				
Turnout		3343	25.39	−7.97
Conservative hold		Swing		

=== New Forest (11 seats) ===
New Forest

Brockenhurst
Party	Candidate	Votes	%	±%
Conservative	Ken Thornber	2027	52.35	−5.97
UKIP	Nigel Cox	977	25.23	+12.07
Liberal Democrats	Allan Hendry	423	10.92	−13.92
Green	John Pemberton	223	5.76	N/A
Labour	Brian Curwain	222	5.73	+2.05
Majority		1050	27.12	−6.36
Turnout		3872	33.61	−10.00
Conservative hold		Swing	−9.02	

Dibden and Hythe
Party	Candidate	Votes	%	±%
Liberal Democrats	Malcolm Wade	2323	50.81	−11.74
Conservative	Michael Harris	1546	33.81	−0.80
Green	Helen Field	352	7.70	N/A
Labour	Peter Dance	351	7.68	+4.21
Majority		777	16.99	−11.57
Turnout		4572	30.91	−8.71
Liberal Democrats hold		Swing		

Fordingbridge
Party	Candidate	Votes	%	±%
Conservative	Edward Heron	1799	46.37	−11.54
UKIP	Sidney Rasey	920	23.71	N/A
Liberal Democrats	Miranda Whitehead	604	15.57	−25.07
Labour	Paul Toynton	266	6.86	+2.42
Green	Janet Richards	253	6.52	N/A
TUSC	Jane Ward	38	0.98	N/A
Majority		879	22.65	−8.40
Turnout		3880	33.45	−9.24
Conservative hold		Swing	−17.63	

Lymington
Party	Candidate	Votes	%	±%
Independent	Jacqui England	1635	43.98	N/A
Conservative	Alan O'Sullivan	1334	35.88	−26.77
Green	Sally May	259	6.97	N/A
Labour	Lena Samuels	245	6.59	+2.43
Liberal Democrats	Stephen Moss	245	6.59	−26.6
Majority				
Turnout		3718	29.37	−9.23
Independent gain from Conservative		Swing		

Lyndhurst
Party	Candidate	Votes	%	±%
Conservative	Keith Mans	1817	47.58	
UKIP	Corrie Williams	1066	27.91	
Liberal Democrats	Stuart Ardern	446	11.68	
Labour	Kenneth Kershaw	278	7.28	
Green	Samantha Mawby	212	5.55	
Majority				
Turnout		3819	30.76	−9.71
Conservative hold		Swing		

Milford and Hordle
Party	Candidate	Votes	%	±%
Conservative	Alan Rice	2001	43.22	
UKIP	Ian Linney	1773	38.29	
Liberal Democrats	Wyn Davies	320	6.91	
Labour	Amy Coakes	306	6.61	
Green	Julia Tremain	230	4.97	
Majority				
Turnout		4630	33.27	−7.86
Conservative hold		Swing		

New Milton
Party	Candidate	Votes	%	±%
Conservative	Mel Kendal	2000	45.31	
UKIP	Ann Vasilesco	1640	37.15	
Labour	Caroline Hexter	378	8.56	
Green	Dan Fish	222	5.03	
Liberal Democrats	Alex Wade	174	3.94	
Majority				
Turnout		4414	31.12	−9.05
Conservative hold		Swing		

Ringwood
Party	Candidate	Votes	%	±%
Conservative	Steve Rippon-Swaine	1426	44.74	
UKIP	Hugh McGuinness	997	31.28	
Labour	Peter Harper	405	12.71	
Green	Sally Rose	359	11.26	
Majority				
Turnout		3187	26.67	−8.88
Conservative hold		Swing		

South Waterside
Party	Candidate	Votes	%	±%
UKIP	Philip Fawkes	1368	37.20	
Conservative	Alexis McEvoy	1053	28.64	
Liberal Democrats	Brian Dash	850	23.12	
Labour	Michael Perkins	266	7.23	
Green	Lorella Weeks	140	3.81	
Majority				
Turnout		3677	28.82	−3.03
UKIP gain from Conservative		Swing		

Totton North
Party	Candidate	Votes	%	±%
UKIP	Chris Lagdon	1026	27.36	
Conservative	Neville Penman	1015	27.07	
Green	Alan Weeks	908	24.21	
Liberal Democrats	Jacquie Shaw	597	15.92	
Labour	Peter Sopowski	204	5.44	
Majority				
Turnout		3750	28.55	−3.96
UKIP gain from Green		Swing		

Totton South and Marchwood
Party	Candidate	Votes	%	±%
Liberal Democrats	David Harrison	1724	42.15	
UKIP	Bob Menhennet	1000	24.45	
Conservative	Dave Russell	802	19.61	
Green	Beverley Golden	312	7.63	
Labour	Alan Goodfellow	252	6.16	
Majority				
Turnout		4090	28.25	−5.63
Liberal Democrats hold		Swing		

=== Rushmoor (5 seats) ===
Rushmoor

Aldershot East
Party	Candidate	Votes	%	±%
Labour	Frank Rust	1292	38.42	+10.88
Conservative	Ron Hughes	1078	32.05	−3.86
UKIP	Adam De Lecq Le Gresley	814	24.20	N/A
Liberal Democrats	Roland Collins	179	5.32	−10.22
Majority		214	6.37	
Turnout		3363	25.37	−4.38
Labour gain from Conservative		Swing	+7.37	

Aldershot West
Party	Candidate	Votes	%	±%
Conservative	Charles Choudhary	948	36.10	−19.83
UKIP	Angela Lennox	818	31.15	N/A
Labour	Jeremy Preece	678	25.82	+5.13
Liberal Democrats	Neville Dewey	182	6.93	−16.45
Majority		130	4.95	−27.60
Turnout		2626	21.64	−6.52
Conservative hold		Swing	−25.49	

Farnborough North
Party	Candidate	Votes	%	±%
Conservative	Roz Chadd	1129	34.23	−0.18
UKIP	Malcolm Small	1029	31.20	N/A
Labour	Sue Gadsby	745	22.59	+16.21
Liberal Democrats	Craig Card	395	11.98	−18.73
Majority		100	3.03	−0.67
Turnout		3298	25.95	−8.47
Conservative hold		Swing	−15.69	

Farnborough South
Party	Candidate	Votes	%	±%
Conservative	John Wall	1729	43.60	−11.53
UKIP	Jane Shattock	996	25.11	N/A
Labour Co-op	Anna Townsend	559	14.09	+7.11
Liberal Democrats	Abul Koher Chowdhury	547	13.79	−24.10
Christian	Juliana Brimicombe	135	3.40	N/A
Majority		733	18.48	+1.24
Turnout		3966	27.21	−10.76
Conservative hold		Swing	−18.32	

Farnborough West
Party	Candidate	Votes	%	±%
UKIP	Mark Staplehurst	1694	41.51	N/A
Conservative	Carol Leversha	1549	37.96	−19.49
Labour	Len Amos	494	12.10	+4.74
Liberal Democrats	Philip Thompson	344	8.43	−26.76
Majority		145	3.55	
Turnout		4081	29.34	−5.48
UKIP gain from Conservative		Swing	+30.5	

=== Test Valley (7 seats) ===
Test Valley

Andover North
Party	Candidate	Votes	%	±%
UKIP	Timothy Rolt	1239	31.57	+12.82
Conservative	Pam Mutton	1229	31.31	−11.42
Liberal Democrats	Len Gates	1053	26.83	−5.29
Labour Co-op	Ryan Sutton	404	10.29	+3.89
Majority		10	0.26	
Turnout		3925	26.38	−5.43
UKIP gain from Conservative		Swing	+12.12	

Andover South
Party	Candidate	Votes	%	±%
UKIP	Tony Hooke	1548	40.94	+19.55
Conservative	David Drew	1492	39.46	−9.63
Liberal Democrats	Ross Fifield	385	10.18	−12.26
Labour	Conor Morris	356	9.42	+2.34
Majority		56	1.48	
Turnout		3781	30.91	−4.82
UKIP gain from Conservative		Swing	+14.59	

Andover West
Party	Candidate	Votes	%	±%
Conservative	Pat West	1886	45.56	−16.68
UKIP	Norman Woods	1590	38.41	+20.69
Labour	Alan Cotter	388	9.37	+3.04
Liberal Democrats	Katherine Bird	276	6.67	−7.04
Majority		296	7.15	−37.37
Turnout		4140	31.51	−7.58
Conservative hold		Swing	−18.69	

Baddesley
Party	Candidate	Votes	%	±%
Liberal Democrats	Alan Dowden	2150	45.83	−14.60
Conservative	Roger Curtis	1151	24.54	−11.70
UKIP	Paul Cadier	1084	23.11	N/A
Labour	Viv Mackay	306	6.52	+3.19
Majority		999	21.30	−2.89
Turnout		4691	35.38	−9.18
Liberal Democrats hold		Swing	−1.45	

Romsey Extra
Party	Candidate	Votes	%	±%
Conservative	Roy Perry	1897	37.51	−20.93
Liberal Democrats	Sandra Gidley	1754	34.66	−3.34
UKIP	Iain Bell	1198	23.69	N/A
Labour	Peter Sowerby	208	4.11	+0.55
Majority		143	2.83	−17.61
Turnout		5057	41.12	−2.78
Conservative hold		Swing	−8.80	

Romsey Town
Party	Candidate	Votes	%	±%
Liberal Democrats	Mark Cooper	2547	51.54	−3.70
Conservative	Nick Michell	1224	24.77	−16.82
UKIP	Dennis Armstrong	912	18.45	N/A
Labour	David Stevens	259	5.24	+2.07
Majority		1323	26.77	+13.12
Turnout		4942	41.01	−6.65
Liberal Democrats hold		Swing	+6.56	

Test Valley Central
Party	Candidate	Votes	%	±%
Conservative	Andrew Gibson	3011	56.42	−4.19
UKIP	Michael Wigby	1277	23.93	+13.46
Liberal Democrats	Richard Rowles	697	13.06	−12.37
Labour	Elizabeth Sowerby	352	6.60	+3.11
Majority		1734	32.49	−2.69
Turnout		5337	36.36	−10.07
Conservative hold		Swing	−8.83	

=== Winchester (7 seats) ===
Winchester

Bishops Waltham
Party	Candidate	Votes	%	±%
Conservative	Rob Humby	1992	40.33	
Liberal Democrats	Roger Bentote	1642	33.25	
UKIP	Vivienne Young	1018	20.61	
Labour	Robert Rudge	287	5.81	
Majority				
Turnout		4939	37.82	−11.67
Conservative gain from Liberal Democrats		Swing		

Itchen Valley
Party	Candidate	Votes	%	±%
Liberal Democrats	Jackie Porter	2908	51.34	
Conservative	Lisa Griffiths	1851	32.68	
UKIP	Clive Boot	707	12.48	
Labour	Andrew Adams	198	3.50	
Majority				
Turnout		5664	43.70	−11.53
Liberal Democrats hold		Swing		

Meon Valley
Party	Candidate	Votes	%	±%
Conservative	Roger Huxstep	2453	56.94	
UKIP	Kim Comotto	959	22.26	
Liberal Democrats	Christopher Day	574	13.32	
Labour	David Picton-Jones	322	7.47	
Majority				
Turnout		4308	36.80	−13.25
Conservative hold		Swing		

Winchester Downlands
Party	Candidate	Votes	%	±%
Liberal Democrats	Phil Bailey	2571	46.37	
Conservative	James Byrnes	1863	33.60	
UKIP	Chris Barton-Briddon	850	15.33	
Labour	Elaine Fullaway	260	4.69	
Majority				
Turnout		5544	42.76	−11.42
Liberal Democrats hold		Swing		

Winchester Eastgate
Party	Candidate	Votes	%	±%
Conservative	Fiona Mather	1748	33.65	
Liberal Democrats	Brian Collin	1741	33.52	
Labour	Patrick Davies	636	12.24	
UKIP	Bradley Monk	580	11.17	
Green	Michael Wilks	457	8.80	
TUSC	Dave Boyes	32	0.62	
Majority				
Turnout		5194	34.62	−9.15
Conservative gain from Liberal Democrats		Swing		

Winchester Southern Parishes
Party	Candidate	Votes	%	±%
Conservative	Patricia Stallard	1618	43.88	
Liberal Democrats	Vivian Achwal	803	21.78	
UKIP	John Henderson	687	18.63	
Independent	John Cooper	382	10.36	
Labour	Sheena King	197	5.34	
Majority				
Turnout		3687	29.55	−9.67
Conservative hold		Swing		

Winchester Westgate
Party	Candidate	Votes	%	±%
Liberal Democrats	Martin Tod	2046	40.15	
Conservative	Ian Tait	1652	32.42	
UKIP	David Abbott	607	11.91	
Labour Co-op	James Leppard	405	7.95	
Green	Dave Walker-Nix	361	7.08	
TUSC	Adam Freeman	25	0.49	
Majority				
Turnout		5096	36.10	−7.55
Liberal Democrats hold		Swing		
