= Cannabis Law Reform =

Cannabis Law Reform Cannabis Law Reform
- Leader: Peter Reynolds
- Ideology: Legalisation of cannabis Drug policy reform
- Colours: Green

Website
- http://clear-uk.org

Cannabis Law Reform (CLEAR), formerly the Legalise Cannabis Alliance, is a United Kingdom lobby group which campaigns to end the prohibition of cannabis. The group was founded in 1997 and reformed as CLEAR in 2011. It campaigned in a number of elections until it was statutorily de-registered by the Electoral Commission in November 2013.

== History ==
=== Legalise Cannabis Alliance ===
2005 election campaign logo

The Legalise Cannabis Alliance (LCA) campaigned for the legalisation of cannabis for all purposes, including medicinal use, as biomass, hemp-based products, and recreational drug use. They fielded candidates in elections to the House of Commons and local government.

The party had origins in a pressure group formed in Norwich. It was registered as a political party in March 1999, after Howard Marks had stood as a Legalise Cannabis candidate in four different constituencies at the 1997 general election: Norwich North, Norwich South, Southampton Test and Neath.

The party used a cannabis leaf image as its emblem and Cannabis : legalise and utilise served as its election manifesto.

The first official LCA candidate in a parliamentary election was former mayor of Carlisle Colin Paisley in the November 1999 by election in the Kensington and Chelsea constituency. He took 141 (0.7%) of the votes. The second was Derrick Large in the May 2000 Romsey byelection, who took 417 (1.1%) of the votes.

In local elections in 2000, the party stood five candidates in Norwich and one in Peterborough, and the party stood frequently in local elections.

In the 2005 general election the LCA stood 18 candidates in 21 constituencies. This was eight more than in the 2001 general election, but included only six that had been contested in that previous election. In all these six constituencies the LCA suffered a fall in its share of the vote, and the average share across 21 constituencies was well down from that across the previous 13. Their best results were in Orkney and Shetland, Worthing East and Shoreham and Leigh. The LCA also stood in seven Welsh constituencies. As well as calling for the legalisation of cannabis, the manifesto in Wales included campaigning against GM food, for lower fuel tax for haulage and transport firms, and support for recycling and renewable energy.

The party met with then Home Secretary and Norwich South MP Charles Clarke in March 2006 to put their case for the legalisation of cannabis.

=== LCA election results ===
Election	Constituency or constituencies	Candidate or candidates	Votes	Share (%)	Change
1999 Kensington and Chelsea by-election	Kensington and Chelsea	Colin Paisley	141	0.7	N/A
2000 Romsey by-election	Romsey	Derrick Large	417	1.1	N/A
2001 general election	Braintree	Michael Nolan	774	1.5	N/A
2001 general election	Calder Valley	Philip Lockwood	672	1.4	N/A
2001 general election	Carlisle	Colin Paisley	554	1.6	N/A
2001 general election	Chelmsford West	Herb Philbin	693	0.9	N/A
2001 general election	East Worthing and Shoreham	Chris Baldwin	920	2.1	N/A
2001 general election	Edinburgh South	Margaret Hendry	535	1.4	N/A
2001 general election	Kingston upon Hull North	Carl Wagner	478	1.7	N/A
2001 general election	Milton Keynes South West	Patman Denning	500	1.1	N/A
2001 general election	North East Fife	Leslie Von Goetz	420	1.2	N/A
2001 general election	Norwich South	Alun Buffry	620	1.5	N/A
2001 general election	Penrith and the Border	Mark Gibson	870	2.0	N/A
2001 general election	Romsey	Derrick Large	601	1.2	+0.1
2001 general election	Workington	John Peacock	1040	2.5	N/A
2005 general election	Canterbury	Rocky van de Benderskum	326	0.7	N/A
2005 general election	Carlisle	Lezley Gibson	343	1.0	-0.6
2005 general election	Carmarthen East and Dinefwr	Sid James Whitworth	343	0.7	N/A
2005 general election	Carmarthen West and Pembrokeshire South	Alex Daszak	343	0.6	N/A
2005 general election	Conwy	Tim Evans	193	0.6	N/A
2005 general election	East Surrey	Winston Matthews	410	0.8	N/A
2005 general election	East Worthing and Shoreham	Chris Baldwin	677	1.5	-0.6
2005 general election	Great Yarmouth	Michael Skipper	389	0.9	N/A
2005 general election	Kingston upon Hull East	Carl Wagner	182	0.6	N/A
2005 general election	Kingston upon Hull North	Carl Wagner	179	0.6	-1.1
2005 general election	Leigh	Thomas Hampson	415	1.5	N/A
2005 general election	Neath	Pat Tabram	334	0.9	N/A
2005 general election	Norwich South	Don Barnard	219	0.5	-1.0
2005 general election	Orkney and Shetland	Paul Cruickshank	311	1.8	N/A
2005 general election	Penrith and the Border	Mark Gibson	549	1.2	-0.8
2005 general election	South Dorset	Vic Hamilton	282	0.6	N/A
2005 general election	Swansea West	Steve Pank	218	0.7	N/A
2005 general election	Vale of Clwyd	Jeff Ditchfield	286	0.9	N/A
2005 general election	Workington	John Peacock	381	1.0	-1.5
2005 general election	Worthing West	Chris Baldwin	550	1.2	N/A
2005 general election	Ynys Mon	Tim Evans	232	0.7	N/A
2012 Corby by-election	Corby	Peter Reynolds	137	0.4	N/A

=== CLEAR ===
The members of the Legalise Cannabis Alliance voted to re-register to contest elections in February 2011. Proposals for a new identity and constitution were put to a referendum of the membership and passed in separate two votes. The party re-registered with the Electoral Commission under its new name of CLEAR Cannabis Law Reform.

The party commissioned a report by the Independent Drug Monitoring Unit, published on 14 September 2011, stating that a taxed and regulated cannabis market would save the exchequer £6.7 billion.

Peter Reynolds stood as CLEAR candidate in the 2012 Corby by-election, taking 137 votes (0.38%).

The party was statutorily de-registered by the UK Electoral Commission in November 2013.

As of 2014, the party states on their website: "We are not presently registered with the Electoral Commission as we are not currently intending to contest any elections.

== See also ==
- Cannabis classification in the United Kingdom
- Cannabis in the United Kingdom
- Cannabis Is Safer Than Alcohol
- Cannabis political parties
- Drug policy reform
- List of political parties in the United Kingdom
