= Romsey (constituency) =

UK Parliament constituency (1983–2010)

Coordinates: 51.004°N 1.491°W

- Former county constituency for the House of Commons
- Boundary of Romsey in Hampshire for the 2005 general election

- Location of Hampshire within England
- County: Hampshire

1983–2010
- Seats: One
- Created from: Eastleigh (fraction of), New Forest (fraction of)
- Replaced by: Romsey and Southampton North

Romsey (Romsey and Waterside from 1983 to 1997) was a seat of the House of Commons of the UK Parliament from 1983 to 2010 which elected one Member of Parliament (MP) by the first past the post system of election. It was similar in extent to its replacement Romsey and Southampton North which includes the Bassett and Swaythling wards of the City of Southampton.

== Boundaries ==
Romsey and Waterside in Hampshire 1983–1997

1983–1997: The Borough of Test Valley wards of Abbey, Blackwater, Chilworth and Nursling, Cuppernham, Field, North Baddesley, Romsey Extra, and Tadburn, and the District of New Forest wards of Blackfield and Langley, Colbury, Dibden and Hythe North, Dibden Purlieu, Fawley Holbury, Hythe South, Marchwood, Netley Marsh, Totton Central, Totton North, and Totton South.

1997–2010: The Borough of Test Valley wards of Abbey, Blackwater, Chilworth and Nursling, Cuppernham, Dun Valley, Field, Harewood, Kings Somborne and Michelmersh, Nether Wallop and Broughton, North Baddesley, Over Wallop, Romsey Extra, Stockbridge, and Tadburn, the Borough of Eastleigh wards of Chandler's Ford, Hiltingbury East, and Hiltingbury West, and the City of Southampton ward of Bassett.

The constituency was approximate to the Test Valley district of Hampshire and covered a smaller area as parts of the north of Test Valley fell into part of the North West Hampshire seat to roughly ensure equal size electorates (low malapportionment). The main town within the constituency was Romsey.

== History ==
The constituency was created in 1983 from parts of the seats of Eastleigh and New Forest. It was originally named Romsey and Waterside and included areas such as Hythe and Fawley on the west side of Southampton Water. In 1997 it lost the Waterside area and gained the Bassett Ward of the City of Southampton, and new territory in the Test Valley district, to the north of Romsey, and was consequently renamed to just Romsey. The first MP, Michael Colvin, held the constituency from its creation until his death in 2000. This led to a by-election, which was won by Liberal Democrat Sandra Gidley, who held the seat in the two subsequent General Elections.

Following their review of parliamentary representation in Hampshire, the Boundary Commission for England created a modified Romsey constituency called Romsey and Southampton North, to reflect the fact that two wards of Southampton form part of the constituency (though one ward had in fact formed part of the constituency since 1997).

Sandra Gidley lost to the Conservatives in the 2010 general election when she contested the new seat. She was succeeded by Caroline Nokes.

== Members of Parliament ==
| Election | Member | Party | Notes |
|---|---|---|---|
| 1983 | Michael Colvin | Conservative | constituency created as Romsey and Waterside, renamed Romsey in 1997 |
| 2000 by-election | Sandra Gidley | Liberal Democrats | |
| 2010 | constituency abolished: see Romsey and Southampton North | | |

== Elections ==
=== Elections in the 2000s ===
General election 2005: Romsey
| Party | Candidate | Votes | % | ±% |
|---|---|---|---|---|
| Liberal Democrats | Sandra Gidley | 22,465 | 44.7 | −2.3 |
| Conservative | Caroline Nokes | 22,340 | 44.4 | +2.3 |
| Labour | Matthew Stevens | 4,430 | 8.8 | +0.6 |
| UKIP | Michael Wigley | 1,076 | 2.1 | +0.6 |
| Majority | | 125 | 0.3 | −4.6 |
| Turnout | | 50,311 | 69.7 | +2.5 |
| Liberal Democrats hold | | Swing | −2.3 | |

General election 2001: Romsey
| Party | Candidate | Votes | % | ±% |
|---|---|---|---|---|
| Liberal Democrats | Sandra Gidley | 22,756 | 47.0 | +17.6 |
| Conservative | Paul Raynes | 20,386 | 42.1 | −3.9 |
| Labour | Stephen Roberts | 3,986 | 8.2 | −10.4 |
| UKIP | Anthony McCabe | 730 | 1.5 | −2.0 |
| Legalise Cannabis | Derrick Large | 601 | 1.2 | New |
| Majority | | 2,370 | 4.9 | N/A |
| Turnout | | 48,459 | 67.2 | −9.2 |
| Liberal Democrats gain from Conservative | | Swing | | |

By-election 2000: Romsey
| Party | Candidate | Votes | % | ±% |
|---|---|---|---|---|
| Liberal Democrats | Sandra Gidley | 19,571 | 50.6 | +21.2 |
| Conservative | Tim Palmer | 16,260 | 42.0 | −4.0 |
| Labour | Andy Howard | 1,451 | 3.7 | −14.9 |
| UKIP | Garry Rankin-Moore | 901 | 2.3 | −1.2 |
| Legalise Cannabis | Derrick Large | 417 | 1.1 | New |
| Independent | Thomas Lamont | 109 | 0.3 | New |
| Majority | | 3,311 | 8.6 | N/A |
| Turnout | | 38,709 | 55.4 | −21.0 |
| Liberal Democrats gain from Conservative | | Swing | +8.6 | |

=== Elections in the 1990s ===
General election 1997: Romsey
| Party | Candidate | Votes | % | ±% |
|---|---|---|---|---|
| Conservative | Michael Colvin | 23,834 | 46.0 | −17.2 |
| Liberal Democrats | Mark G. Cooper | 15,249 | 29.4 | +6.3 |
| Labour | Joanne V. Ford | 9,623 | 18.6 | +5.7 |
| UKIP | Alan Sked | 1,824 | 3.5 | New |
| Referendum | Michael J.L. Wigley | 1,291 | 2.5 | New |
| Majority | | 8,585 | 16.57 | −23.5 |
| Turnout | | 51,821 | 76.4 | −6.8 |
| Conservative hold | | Swing | | |

General election 1992: Romsey and Waterside
| Party | Candidate | Votes | % | ±% |
|---|---|---|---|---|
| Conservative | Michael Colvin | 37,375 | 54.4 | −2.0 |
| Liberal Democrats | George Dawson | 22,071 | 32.1 | +0.1 |
| Labour | Angela Mawle | 8,688 | 12.6 | +1.1 |
| Green | John C.T. Spottiswood | 577 | 0.8 | New |
| Majority | | 15,304 | 22.3 | −2.2 |
| Turnout | | 68,711 | 83.16 | +4.2 |
| Conservative hold | | Swing | | |

=== Elections in the 1980s ===
General election 1987: Romsey and Waterside
| Party | Candidate | Votes | % | ±% |
|---|---|---|---|---|
| Conservative | Michael Colvin | 35,303 | 56.4 | −0.2 |
| SDP | Alan Bloss | 20,031 | 32.0 | +0.9 |
| Labour | Stephen Roberts | 7,213 | 11.5 | −0.8 |
| Majority | | 15,272 | 24.5 | −1.0 |
| Turnout | | 62,547 | 79.0 | +3.2 |
| Conservative hold | | Swing | | |

General election 1983: Romsey and Waterside
| Party | Candidate | Votes | % | ±% |
|---|---|---|---|---|
| Conservative | Michael Colvin | 30,361 | 56.6 | |
| SDP | Alan Bloss | 16,671 | 31.1 | |
| Labour | Matthew Knight | 6,604 | 12.3 | |
| Majority | | 13,690 | 25.5 | |
| Turnout | | 53,636 | 75.8 | |
| Conservative win (new seat) | | | | |

== See also ==
- List of parliamentary constituencies in Hampshire
