= 2000 Romsey by-election =

2000 UK Parliamentary by-election

- 4 May 2000

Romsey parliamentary seat
- Turnout: 55.4%
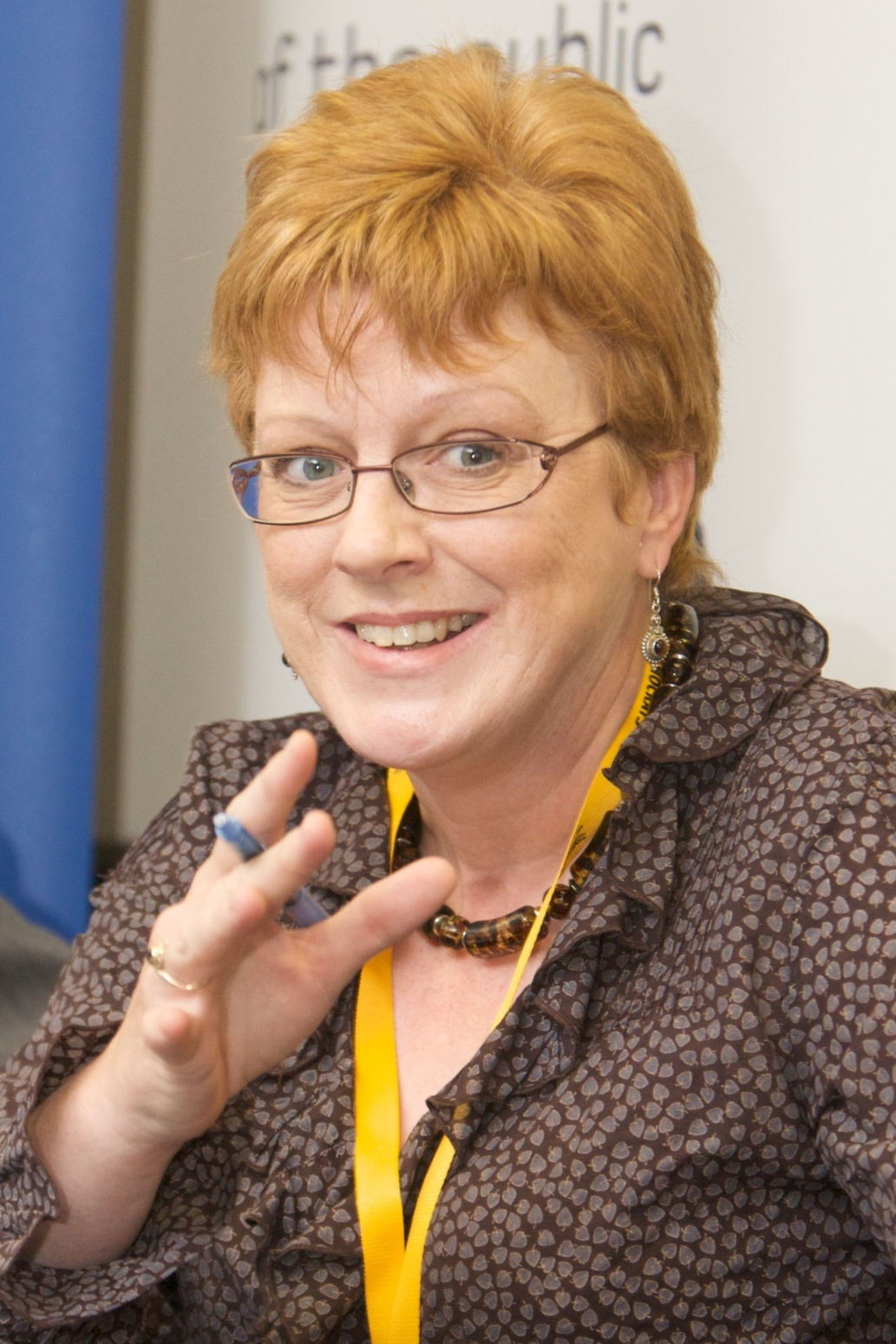
	First party	Second party
		Con
Candidate	Sandra Gidley	Tim Palmer
Party	Liberal Democrats	Conservative
Popular vote	19,571	16,260
Percentage	50.56%	42.01%
Swing	▲21.2%	▼4.0%
MP before election
Michael Colvin
Conservative
Subsequent MP
Sandra Gidley
Liberal Democrats

A by-election for the United Kingdom parliamentary constituency of Romsey was held on 4 May 2000, triggered by the death of incumbent Conservative Party Member of Parliament (MP) Michael Colvin. It was won by Sandra Gidley of the Liberal Democrats, who gained the seat from the Conservatives.

Colvin and his wife Nichola died in a fire at their home, Tangley House in Tangley, Hampshire, on 24 February 2000. Polling day was set for 4 May so that it would come simultaneously with local elections. The Conservatives selected Tim Palmer, a farmer and Dorset County Councillor, to defend the seat. The Liberal Democrats considered this by-election their best chance of gaining a seat since 1997 and selected a local pharmacist Sandra Gidley (who had been Mayor of Romsey) as their candidate. The Democratic Party attempted to stand Charles Beauclerk, 15th Duke of St Albans as their candidate, but he did not appear on the ballot due to an error.

Labour carried out minimal campaigning in a constituency in which they had come third for years. This led many observers to assume that the party was expecting, or hoping, that its vote would largely go to the Liberal Democrats in order to help defeat the Conservatives. In the event, the Labour vote collapsed while the Liberal Democrats surged, and they made this the only mainland by-election to result in a change of party control in the entire Parliament. This was the first time the Conservatives had lost a seat in a by-election while in Opposition since the 1965 Roxburgh, Selkirk and Peebles by-election, and would be the last time the Liberal Democrats gained a constituency from the Conservatives at a by-election until Sarah Olney and Zac Goldsmith, Baron Goldsmith of Richmond Park at the 2016 Richmond Park by-election.

== Result ==
By-election 2000: Romsey
Party	Candidate	Votes	%	±%
Liberal Democrats	Sandra Gidley	19,571	50.6	+21.2
Conservative	Tim Palmer	16,260	42.0	−4.0
Labour	Andy Howard	1,451	3.7	−14.9
UKIP	Garry Rankin-Moore	901	2.3	−1.2
Legalise Cannabis	Derrick Large	417	1.1	New
Independent	Thomas Lamont	109	0.3	New
Majority		3,311	8.6	N/A
Turnout		38,709	55.4	–21.0
Liberal Democrats gain from Conservative		Swing	+8.6	

== Previous result ==
General election 1997: Romsey
Party	Candidate	Votes	%	±%
Conservative	Michael Colvin	23,834	46.0	−17.2
Liberal Democrats	Mark Cooper	15,249	29.4	+6.3
Labour	Joanne Ford	9,623	18.6	+5.7
UKIP	Alan Sked	1,824	3.5	New
Referendum	Michael Wigley	1,291	2.5	New
Majority		8,585	16.57	−23.5
Turnout		51,821	76.36	−6.8
Conservative hold		Swing		
