= Wildhern =

Village and parish in Hampshire, England

Coordinates: 51.256673°N 1.495891°W

- Location within Hampshire
- OS grid reference: SU3527550955
- Civil parish: Wildhern
- District: Test Valley
- Shire county: Hampshire
- Region: South East
- Country: England
- Sovereign state: United Kingdom
- Post town: ANDOVER
- Postcode district: SP11 0
- Dialling code: 01264
- Police: Hampshire and Isle of Wight
- Fire: Hampshire and Isle of Wight
- Ambulance: South Central
- UK Parliament: North West Hampshire

Wildhern is a small village and civil parish in the Test Valley district of Hampshire, England. It is in the civil parish of Tangley. Its nearest town is Andover, which lies approximately 3.3 miles (5.3 km) south from the village.
