= Michael Colvin =

British politician (1932–2000)

Michael Colvin MP

Member of Parliament
- In office 3 May 1979 – 24 February 2000
- Preceded by: Ronald Thomas
- Succeeded by: Sandra Gidley
- Constituency: Bristol North West (1979–1983); Romsey and Waterside (1983–1997); Romsey (1997–2000)

Personal details
- Born: Michael Keith Beale Colvin; 27 September 1932 London, England
- Died: 24 February 2000 (aged 67) Tangley, Hampshire, England
- Party: Conservative
- Spouse: Nichola Cayzer
- Children: 3
- Education: Royal Agricultural College

Michael Keith Beale Colvin (27 September 1932 – 24 February 2000) was a British Conservative Party politician. He was first elected as the Member of Parliament (MP) for Bristol North West at the 1979 general election. From 1983 onwards, he was the MP for Romsey and Waterside constituency in Hampshire, which later became the constituency of Romsey.

== Early life and career ==
Michael Colvin was born in London to Captain Ivan Beale Colvin and Joy Arbuthnot. He had a brother, Alistair Colvin, four years his junior. He was privately educated, firstly at West Downs School in Winchester, and then at Eton College. He then attended the Royal Military Academy at Sandhurst. Joining the Grenadier Guards at 18, he served in Berlin, Suez and Cyprus, and became a captain.

Active in local government at first, he was an elected member of the Tangley parish council, Andover rural district council and Hampshire County Council. He had left Hampshire local government by the mid-1970s.

== Parliamentary career ==
=== Policy positions ===
He won his first parliamentary seat in 1979 in the Bristol North West constituency. He was considered to be one of the "wets", and thus under Margaret Thatcher likely to remain a backbencher.

Colvin showed political ambivalence; he urged the creation of a new centre party, but also called for the privatisation of the NHS. In 1983, he moved to the newly created seat of Romsey and Waterside, near Southampton. Opposed to bans on fox hunting, Colvin was the chairman of the Council for Country Sports from 1988. Colvin rejected gun control; he was a leading figure of the "gun lobby" following the Hungerford and Dunblane massacres. In 1989 he sponsored a private member's bill which became the Computer Misuse Act 1990.

=== Southern Africa ===
Colvin became the chairman of the Conservative Foreign and Commonwealth Affairs Committee. He supported the South-African-backed anti-SWAPO white forces in Africa and endorsed the Namibia regime in 1981. In his Guardian obituary of Colvin, Andrew Roth wrote that the MP "was also a somewhat secretive former propagandist for apartheid South Africa". He defended the whites of southern Africa, accepting invitations to visit South Africa, then under apartheid, and Bophuthatswana, a Bantustan ('homeland') set up for blacks by the South African government. He urged that the 'homelands', which were not internationally recognised, should be accepted. Although he supported reformist Denis Worrall's election campaign in 1987, the following year he criticised the BBC for broadcasting the concert tribute to Nelson Mandela. Connected to the Strategic Network International (SNI), a lobbyist front set up in 1985 to campaign against the imposition of economic sanctions against South Africa, Colvin was involved in finding sympathetic Conservative MPs to visit the 'homelands' on expenses paid trips. The Conservative activist Derek Laud was involved in SNI and was responsible for recommending Colvin to the group.

In 1991, Colvin became a consultant to SNI (at £10,000 a year), in succession to Neil Hamilton. Colvin, with Conservative colleagues John Carlisle and David Atkinson were among members of SNI sent to watch the peace process in Angola during 1992. SNI dissolved the following year. His consultancy with SNI was not declared, and when the connection became known in 1994, the media linked the issue to then on-going cash-for-questions affair: "It was not registered. It is an oversight which I regret", Colvin said. At this time, among 11 Conservative MPs, he was found by the Commons Select Committee on Members' Interests to have failed to declare, as a Lloyd's 'Name', details of his syndicate's activities, specifically the areas of insurance underwritten. He was a friend to lobbyists such as Ian Greer, more directly implicated in the cash for questions scandal, which led to Hamilton's disgrace. Later, Colvin became a director of the Laud Ludgate lobbying organisation.

== Personal life and death ==
He married Nichola Cayzer, the daughter of Nicholas Cayzer, Baron Cayzer. The couple had three children; two daughters and a son.

Colvin and his wife died in a fire at their house, Tangley House, near Andover in February 2000. The following by-election led to the Liberal Democrats gaining the seat with their candidate Sandra Gidley being elected.

Parliament of the United Kingdom
Preceded by Ronald Thomas	Member of Parliament for Bristol North West; 1979–1983	Succeeded by Michael Stern
New constituency	Member of Parliament for Romsey and Waterside; 1983–1997	Constituency abolished
New constituency	Member of Parliament for Romsey; 1997–2000	Succeeded by Sandra Gidley
