= Wight and Hampshire South (European Parliament constituency) =

Constituency of the European Parliament

- European Parliament constituency
- Boundary within South East England and London (1994-1999)
- Member state: United Kingdom
- Created: 1994
- Dissolved: 1999
- MEPs: 1

Prior to its uniform adoption of proportional representation in 1999, the United Kingdom used first-past-the-post for the European Parliament elections in England, Scotland and Wales. The European Parliament constituencies used under that system were smaller than the later regional constituencies and only had one Member of the European Parliament each.

The constituency of Wight and Hampshire South was one of them.

It consisted of the Westminster Parliament constituencies (on their 1983 boundaries) of Fareham, Gosport, Isle of Wight, Portsmouth North, Portsmouth South, and Winchester.

== Members of the European Parliament ==
Elected	Member	Party
1994	Roy Perry	Conservative
1999	Constituency abolished: see South East England	

== Election results ==
European Parliament election, 1994: Wight and Hampshire South
Party	Candidate	Votes	%	±%
Conservative	Roy Perry	63,306	34.9	
Liberal Democrats	Mike Hancock	58,205	32.0	
Labour	Miss S-L. Fry	40,442	22.3	
Independent	J. E. D. D. Browne	12,140	6.7	
Green	Paul A. Fuller	6,697	3.7	
Natural Law	William A. Treend	722	0.4	
Majority		5,101	2.9	
Turnout		181,512	37.2	
Conservative win (new seat)				
