= Romsey and Southampton North =

UK Parliament constituency (since 2010)

Coordinates: 51.09°N 1.52°W

- County constituency for the House of Commons
- Boundaries since 2024
- Boundary of Romsey and Southampton North in South East England
- County: Hampshire
- Electorate: 73,831 (2023)
- Major settlements: Romsey; Swaythling; North Baddesley

Current constituency
- Created: 2010
- Member of Parliament: Caroline Nokes (Conservative)
- Seats: One
- Created from: Romsey

Romsey and Southampton North is a constituency represented in the House of Commons of the UK Parliament since its 2010 creation by Caroline Nokes for the Conservative Party. For the purposes of election expenses and type of returning officer it is a county constituency.

== Constituency profile ==
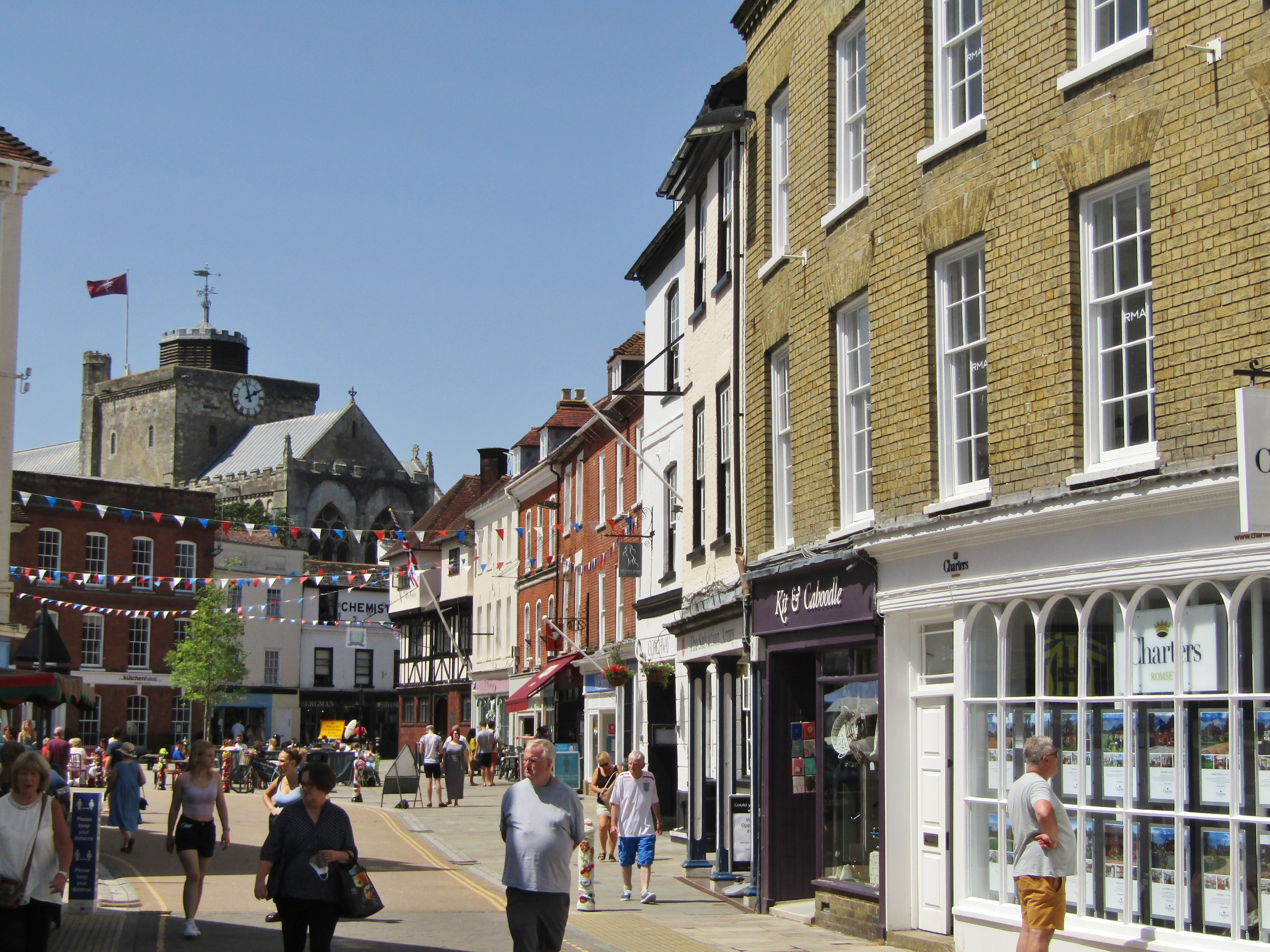
Romsey town centre with Romsey Abbey visible in the background

Romsey and Southampton North is a constituency in Hampshire in South East England, covering most of the Test Valley district. It includes the northern Southampton suburbs of Bassett and Swaythling, the towns of Romsey and Stockbridge and the villages of North Baddesley, Nursling, Wellow and Charlton.

This is a mostly rural constituency with many small villages and hamlets; most of its population lives in the south of the constituency close to Southampton. Romsey is a historic market town known for its 12th-century abbey. The constituency is mostly wealthy, especially in Romsey, Nursling and Bassett, although there is some deprivation in Swaythling. Most residents live in detached or semi-detached properties and the average house price across the constituency is higher than the UK average.

Romsey and Southampton North has a large retired population and also a high proportion of students; Highfield Campus, the main campus of the University of Southampton, and Southampton General Hospital, which is partially run by the university, are both located adjacent to this constituency and many students live in Bassett and Swaythling. Residents have high levels of income and homeownership and the child poverty rate is low. They are generally well-educated and a high proportion work in the science and transport sectors. The percentage of residents claiming unemployment benefits is around half the UK-wide rate. White people made up 89% of the population at the 2021 census.

At the local council level, Romsey and the Southampton suburbs are represented by Liberal Democrats whilst the rural areas elected Conservatives. An estimated 52% of voters in Romsey and Southampton North supported remaining in the European Union in the 2016 referendum; higher than the UK-wide figure of 48%.

== History ==
Parliament accepted the Boundary Commission's Fifth Periodic Review of Westminster constituencies which created this constituency for the 2010 general election primarily as an extended Romsey constituency.

== Boundaries ==
Map of 2010-2024 boundaries

2010–2024: Romsey and Southampton North was formed from electoral wards:

- Bassett, and Swaythling in the City of Southampton; and
- Abbey, Ampfield and Braishfield, Blackwater, Broughton and Stockbridge, Chilworth, Nursling and Rownhams, Cupernham, Dun Valley, Harewood, Kings Somborne and Michelmersh, North Baddesley, Over Wallop, Romsey Extra, Tadburn, and Valley Park in the Borough of Test Valley

2024–present: Further to the 2023 Periodic Review of Westminster constituencies which became effective for the 2024 general election, the constituency is composed of the following (as they existed on 1 December 2020):

- The City of Southampton wards of: Bassett; Swaythling.
- The Borough of Test Valley wards of: Ampfield & Braishfield; Anna; Shipton Bellinger; Blackwater; Charlton & the Pentons; Chilworth, Nursling & Rownhams; Harewood; Mid Test; North Baddesley; Romsey Abbey; Romsey Cupernham; Romsey Tadburn.

The boundaries were extended northwards to included rural areas to the south and west of Andover, transferred from North West Hampshire. The Valley Park ward was to be transferred to Eastleigh.

The area includes Stockbridge, which was a rotten borough until its abolition under the Reform Act 1832.

== Members of Parliament ==
Romsey prior to 2010

Election	Member	Party
2010	Caroline Nokes	Conservative
Sep 2019	Caroline Nokes	Independent
Oct 2019	Caroline Nokes	Conservative

== Elections ==
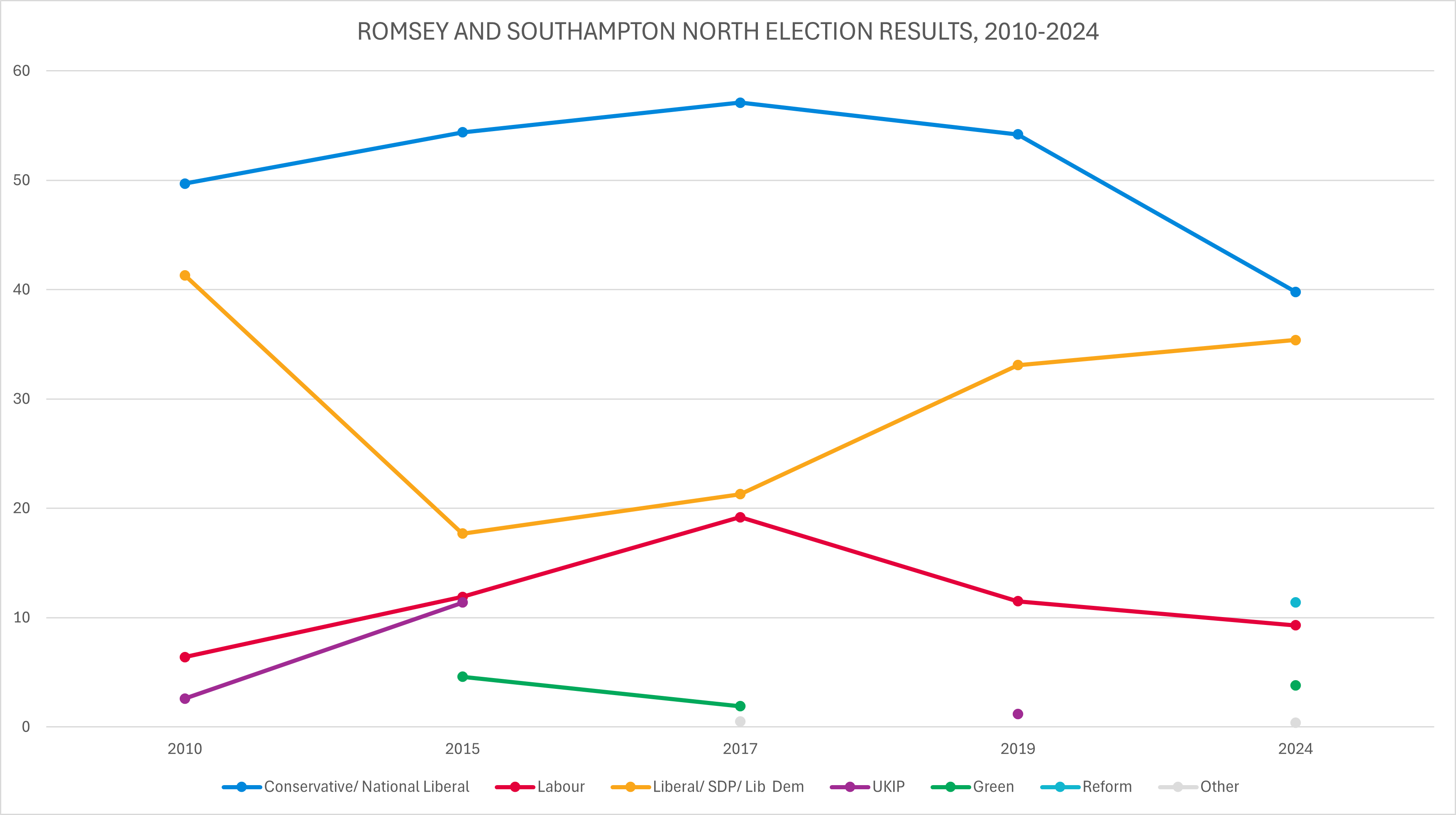
Election results 2010-2024

=== Elections in the 2020s ===
General election 2024: Romsey and Southampton North
Party	Candidate	Votes	%	±%
Conservative	Caroline Nokes	19,893	39.8	−18.1
Liberal Democrats	Geoff Cooper	17,702	35.4	+7.3
Reform	Paul Barrett	5,716	11.4	New
Labour	Christie Lambert	4,640	9.3	−2.8
Green	Connor Shaw	1,893	3.8	+3.1
Independent	Fennie Yap	183	0.4	New
Majority		2,191	4.4	−25.3
Turnout		50,027	69.6	−4.5
Registered electors		71,871		
Conservative hold		Swing	−12.7	

=== Elections in the 2010s ===
2019 notional result
Party	Vote	%
Conservative	31,647	57.9
Liberal Democrats	15,396	28.1
Labour	6,630	12.1
Others	640	1.2
Green	391	0.7
Turnout	54,704	74.1
Electorate	73,831	

General election 2019: Romsey and Southampton North
Party	Candidate	Votes	%	±%
Conservative	Caroline Nokes	27,862	54.2	−2.9
Liberal Democrats	Craig Fletcher	16,990	33.1	+11.8
Labour	Claire Ransom	5,898	11.5	−7.7
UKIP	Geoff Bentley	640	1.2	New
Majority		10,872	21.1	−14.7
Turnout		51,390	75.3	+0.6
Conservative hold		Swing	−7.35	

General election 2017: Romsey and Southampton North
Party	Candidate	Votes	%	±%
Conservative	Caroline Nokes	28,668	57.1	+2.7
Liberal Democrats	Catherine Royce	10,662	21.3	+3.6
Labour	Darren Paffey	9,614	19.2	+7.3
Green	Ian Callaghan	953	1.9	−2.7
JAC	Don Jerrard	271	0.5	New
Majority		18,006	35.8	−0.9
Turnout		50,168	74.7	+1.94
Conservative hold		Swing	−0.35	

General election 2015: Romsey and Southampton North
Party	Candidate	Votes	%	±%
Conservative	Caroline Nokes	26,285	54.4	+4.7
Liberal Democrats	Ben Nicholls	8,573	17.7	−23.6
Labour	Darren Paffey	5,749	11.9	+5.5
UKIP	Sandra James	5,511	11.4	+8.8
Green	Ian Callaghan	2,218	4.6	New
Majority		17,712	36.7	+28.3
Turnout		48,336	72.76	+0.2
Conservative hold		Swing	+14.1	

This constituency was contested for the first time at the 2010 general election. Liberal Democrat MP Sandra Gidley had been the MP for the predecessor seat of Romsey since 2000.

General election 2010: Romsey and Southampton North
Party	Candidate	Votes	%	±%
Conservative	Caroline Nokes	24,345	49.7	+6.6
Liberal Democrats	Sandra Gidley	20,189	41.3	−2.4
Labour	Aktar Beg	3,116	6.4	−4.6
UKIP	John Meropoulos	1,289	2.6	+0.3
Majority		4,156	8.4	
Turnout		48,939	72.6	+6.2
Conservative win (new seat)				

== See also ==
- List of parliamentary constituencies in Hampshire
- List of parliamentary constituencies in the South East England (region)

== Sources ==
- Romsey and Southampton North on UKPollingReport
