= Hatherden =

Village and parish in Hampshire, England

Coordinates: 51.251015°N 1.507825°W

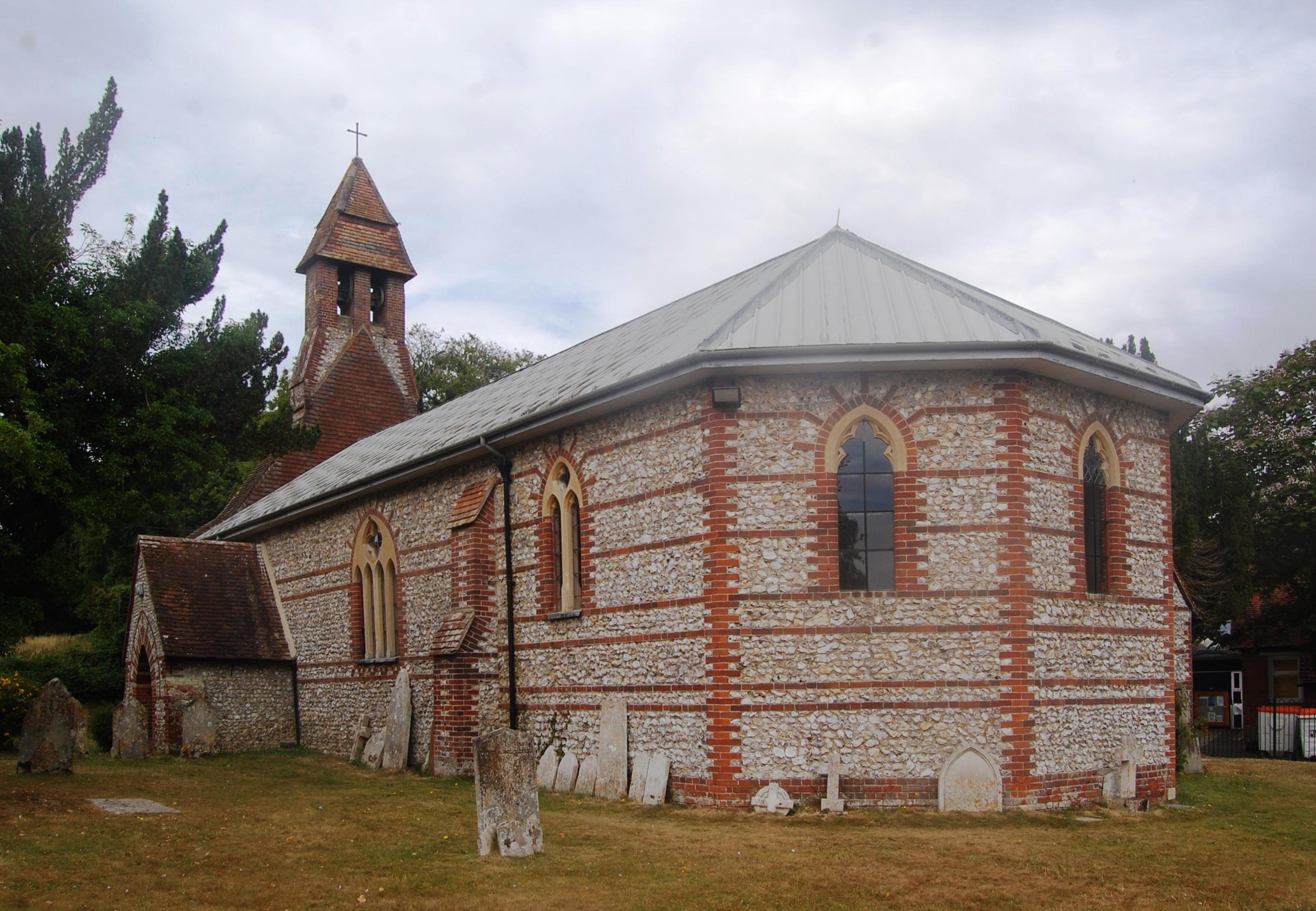
- Christ Church, a Grade II listed building

- Location within Hampshire
- OS grid reference: SU3444750320
- Civil parish: Hatherden
- District: Test Valley
- Shire county: Hampshire
- Region: South East
- Country: England
- Sovereign state: United Kingdom
- Post town: ANDOVER
- Postcode district: SP11
- Dialling code: 01264
- Police: Hampshire and Isle of Wight
- Fire: Hampshire and Isle of Wight
- Ambulance: South Central
- UK Parliament: North West Hampshire

Hatherden is a village and civil parish in the Test Valley district of Hampshire, England. Located within an Area of Outstanding Natural Beauty, its nearest town is Andover, which lies approximately 3.3 miles (4.5 km) south from the village.

== History ==
The Parish church, Christ Church, was built in 1857 by William White. In 1975, the church was damaged by lightning, but was restored with a new roof and was Grade II listed on the 27th September 1984.

At the 2011 census the Post Office say the population was included in the civil parish of Tangley.

The village Primary School closed on 31st August 2022.

== Amenities ==
There is one pub, named the Old Bell and Crown. Hatherden is a short walk to The Fox Inn which is well known for its Thai restaurant.
