= Roy Perry =

British politician (born 1943)

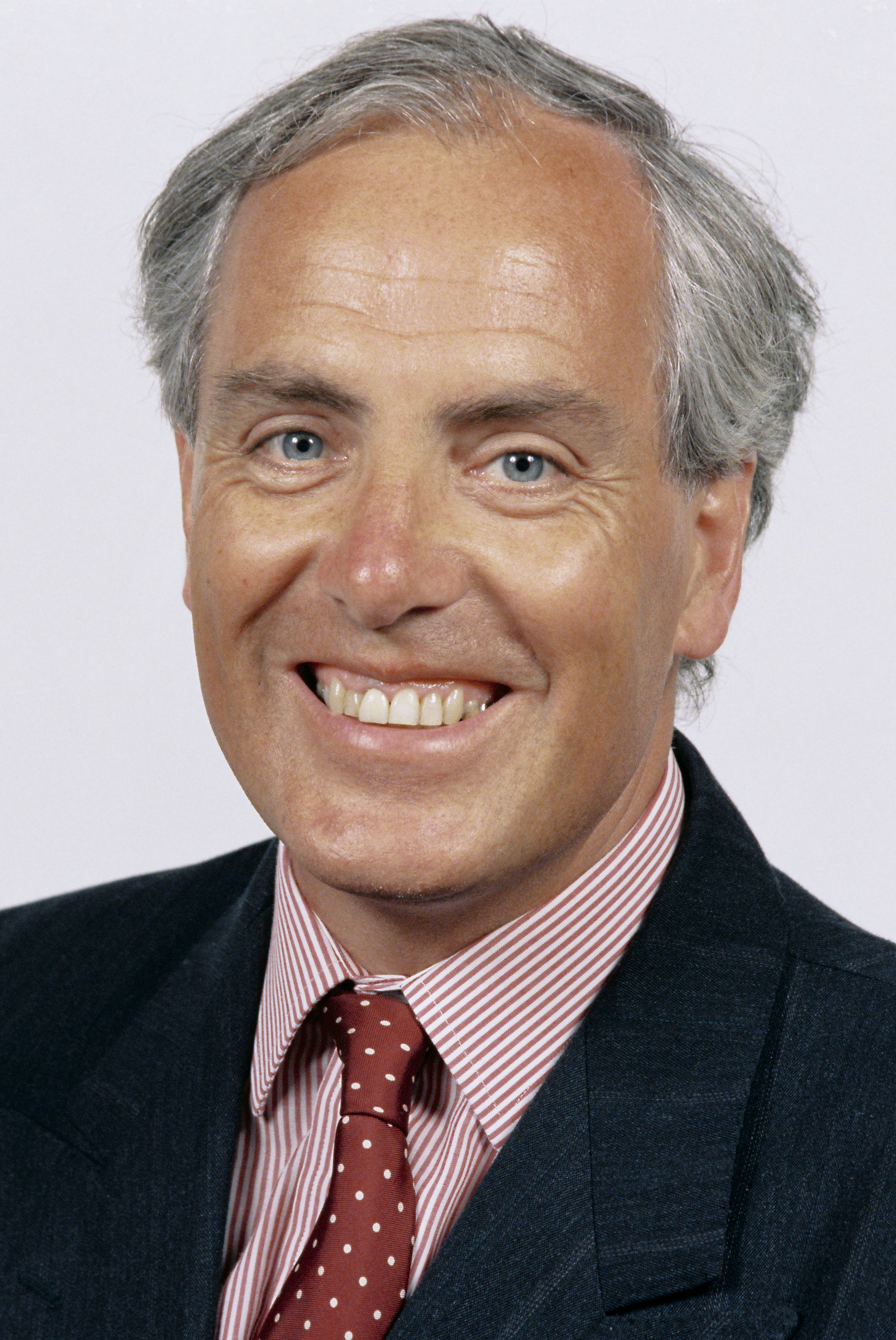
Perry whilst an MEP

Roy James Perry (born 12 February 1943) is a British Conservative Party politician. He served as a Member of the European Parliament (MEP) from 1994 to 2004.

== Background ==
Perry was educated at Tottenham County Grammar School, and graduated from the University of Exeter with a degree in government and politics. He was formerly a senior lecturer in politics at Southampton Technical College.

== Political career ==
Perry was an elected member of Test Valley Borough Council from 1979 to 1994. He was leader between 1985 and 1994. During this time, Perry contested the seat of Swansea West for the Conservatives in the 1992 general election. He was elected as Member of the European Parliament for the Wight and Hampshire South constituency in the 1994 European Parliament election and was re-elected under the new system of proportional representation in the 1999 European Parliament election to represent the South East England electoral region.

In December 2002, Perry was placed sixth on the Conservative list for the 2004 elections. Four Conservative MEPs were elected in the region so Perry was not.

Following the 2004 European Parliament election, Perry concentrated on his roles as Director of the Trident Trust, Trustee of the Hampshire Museums Service, and Director of the Isle of Wight Partnership. He also led Hampshire County Council (2013-2019).

== Personal life ==
Perry was married and has two daughters, one of whom, Caroline Nokes, was elected as the Member of Parliament (MP) for Romsey and Southampton North in the 2010 General Election. He announced the death of his wife Veronica in June 2025.

European Parliament
New constituency	Member of the European Parliament for Wight and Hampshire South; 1994–1999	Constituency abolished
New constituency	Member of the European Parliament for South East England; 1999–2004	Succeeded by Ashley Mote
