= Tangley =

Village and parish in Hampshire, England

Coordinates: 51.271984°N 1.528719°W

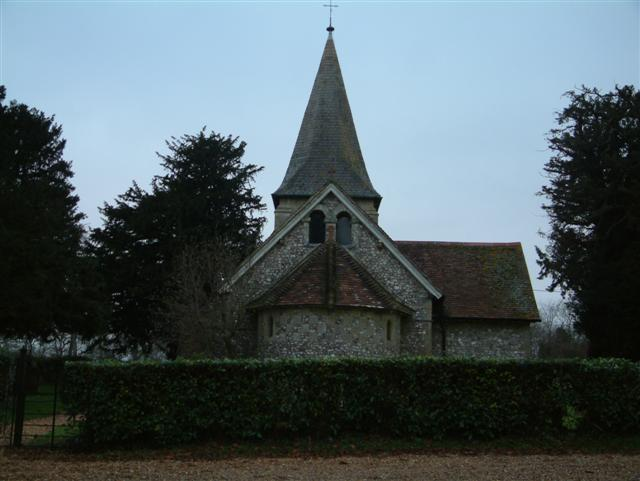
- St. Thomas of Canterbury Church, Tangley

- Location within Hampshire
- Population: 557 (2011 Census including Little Hatherden and Wildhern)
- District: Test Valley
- Shire county: Hampshire
- Region: South East
- Country: England
- Sovereign state: United Kingdom
- Post town: Andover
- Postcode district: SP11
- Dialling code: 01264
- Police: Hampshire and Isle of Wight
- Fire: Hampshire and Isle of Wight
- Ambulance: South Central
- UK Parliament: North West Hampshire

Tangley is a village in the English county of Hampshire, north of the old market town of Andover and the village of Charlton, Hampshire.

Tangley Parish covers an area of 4,017 acres (16.26 km^{2}) and has just under 600 residents in three villages, Tangley, Wildhern and Hatherden and the hamlets of Charlton Down and Little Hatherden.

== History ==
A fire in a manor house resulted in the deaths of MP Michael Colvin and his wife in February 2000.
