= Avery Terrace =

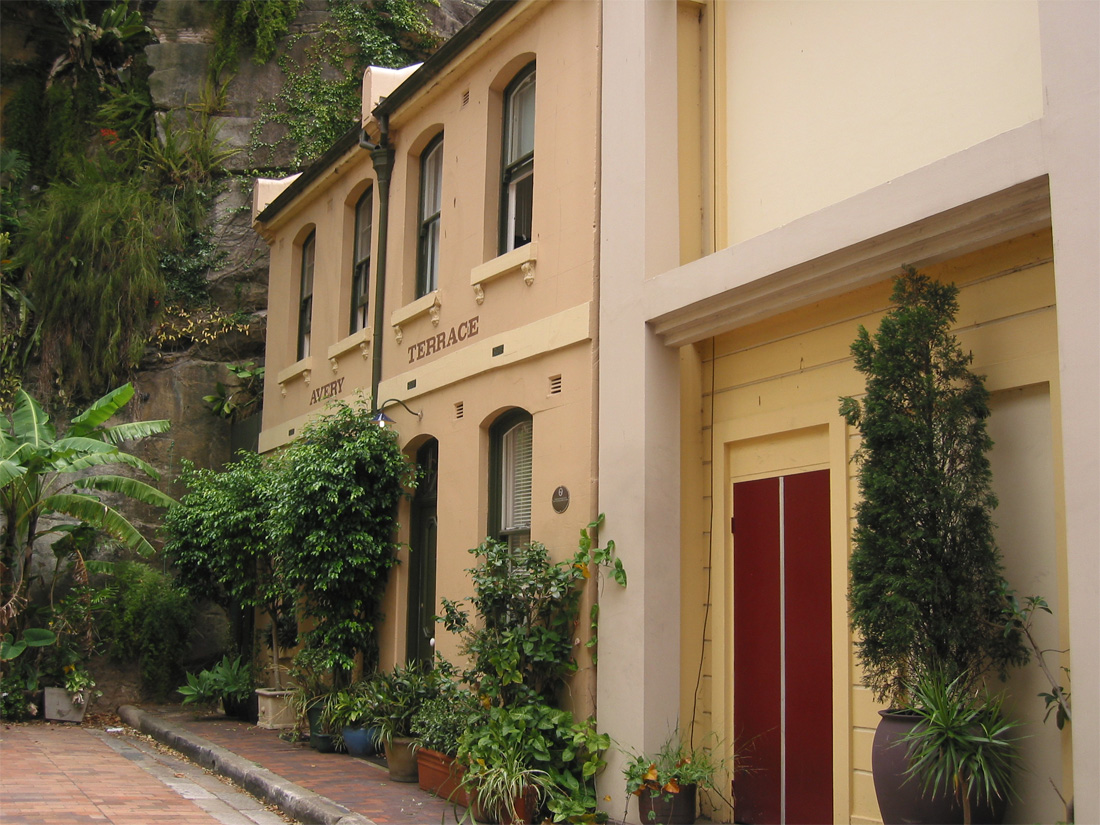
- Avery Terrace, pictured in 2009

- Location within Sydney Location within Australia
- 33.8577°S 151.2083°E
- Location: 2–4 Atherden Street, The Rocks, City of Sydney, New South Wales, Australia

History
- Built: 1881

Site notes
- Architectural style: Victorian Regency
- Owner: Property NSW

New South Wales Heritage Register
- Official name: Avery Terrace; Former Ebsworth's Terraces; Ebsworth's
- Type: State heritage (built)
- Designated: 10 May 2002
- Reference no.: 1529
- Type: Terrace
- Category: Residential buildings (private)

Avery Terrace is a row of heritage-listed terrace houses located at 2–4 Atherden Street in the inner city Sydney suburb of The Rocks in the City of Sydney local government area of New South Wales, Australia. It was designed in 1881, and it is also known as Former Ebsworth's Terraces and Ebsworth's. The property is owned by Property NSW, an agency of the Government of New South Wales. It was added to the New South Wales State Heritage Register on 10 May 2002.

== History ==
The land on which the subject property was once part of a grant to Robert Campbell Senior in 1834. Campbell used the site west of the "High Street" (later George Street North or Lower George Street) and another closer to the harbour's western shore to operate wharves and a successful mercantile business. Campbell & Co operated in the colony from 1800, and by 1804 the firm was heavily engaged in NSW trade. On 16 October 1834, Lot 1 (2 roods 15 perches), Lot 2 (3 roods 34 perches, later known as Lot 1), Lot 3 (3 roods 25.5 perches) and Lot 4 (2 roods 5 perches) were formally granted to Robert Campbell Snr "to promote the Establishment of Towns in the Colony of NSW". The grant was subject to conditions including the construction within three years of a permanent dwelling house with appropriate drainage on each allotment and payment of a "Quit Rent" over nine-years. Campbell used some of the land for his own business needs, leasing other parts for trade and associated port activities. It was one of a number of land grants acquired by Campbell in NSW.

In early 1841 Robert Campbell Snr subdivided Lot 1 in preparation for sale. The site was roughly triangular-shaped and bound by George Street North on its eastern side and by New George Street (later renamed Gloucester Walk) to the west. Its western boundary was dominated by a long sandstone bluff running north-south along the peninsula, reducing in height toward Dawes Point to the north. The bluff separated Campbell's Lot 1 and Lot 2 further to the west. Campbell was willing to accept £40,000 for his property of more than four acres adjacent to the wharf and including warehouses. Auctioneer Mr Thomas Stubbs described the land 'At Campbell's Wharf, Opposite the Entrance Gate' as, "All that well adapted and valuable plot of ground of the Estate of R. Campbell, Esq., M.C., and now subdivided into Six Building Allotments, open and immediately accessible to all the general shipping, Custom House, Bonded Warehouse, and harbour business of the trade and port of Sydney. (It) commands all the shipping lying in Sydney Cove".

The property, to be auctioned on 2 June 1841, bounded George Street and a short street "charted out as Union-street" (later renamed Atherden Street). In a prime position, it sketches a carriageway and approach from Campbell's Wharf and George-street, to a proposed parallel extension of George-street, forking off from Essex-street, through Argyle-street, passing the Custom House, and joining Lower George-street again. The land was well-positioned for the construction of "properly built warehouses", for which there was a strong demand. The land was reported to have realised an average of £16 per foot; however, Land Titles indicate that Lots 9 and 10 remained unsold. Lots 1 and 2 were purchased by George Atherden, a wharfinger of Sydney, who in 1878 was to purchase Lots 9 and 10 (11 perches to the south-west corner of Campbell's grant), which are the subject site. By 1856 Atherden had constructed four stone cottages facing Union Street. They were listed in the City of Sydney Assessment Books from 1858.

Robert Campbell Senior died at Duntroon on 15 April 1846. The estate included substantial acreages throughout New South Wales, as well as the residue of the George Street site and Lots 9 and 10. In 1848 the heirs to Campbell's estate agreed to partition the landholdings amongst the shareholders, with the one rood 32.5 perch residue of the George Street North allotment allocated to Arthur Jeffreys. The land remained part of the trust and was left to "the use of his brothers-in-law". An 1849 road alignment plan confirms Arthur Jeffreys ownership of the land at this time and the lots that had been sold, and the buildings constructed along George Street. Union Street is shown near the southern end of the site, bound on the north and south by Martyn and Coombes' owned buildings. George Atherden's premises are indicated on the southern boundary of Campbell's Lot 2.

Arthur Jeffreys died in England in 1861, leaving his interests in the Campbell Estate to his son, John Jeffreys. Primary sources of this period confirm that Lots 9 and 10 remained vacant until the early 1880s. In 1873 a conveyance was made between John and George Campbell and John Jeffreys of Fernhill, England, per Arthur's will. By this time, land titles indicate that it was the sole remaining allotment of Campbell's grant in The Rocks and known as Lots 9 & 10 (11 perches). In February 1878, ending a long period of ownership by the Campbell family, George Atherden purchased Lots 9 and 10, adding to his substantial land and business interests in The Rocks at this location. c. 1875 – c. 1876 the Union Street had been renamed Atherden Street after George Atherden, who owned property on the south side of the street and lots facing George Street.

In October 1878, George Atherden sold Lots 9 and 10 to Edward Stanley Ebsworth (1832–1901). A month before this, Ebsworth had purchased land nearby, facing George Street, commencing c. 1880 the construction of five terraces at the George Street site. By c. 1881 – c. 1882 Ebsworth had built a terrace on the Union Street allotment. Sydney Municipal Council's Assessment Books indicate that the Union Street terrace consisted of two, two-storey, four-roomed residences constructed of brick with slate roofs. The Atherden Street terrace, although not as ornate as the George Street terrace, or in such a prominent position, was a modestly scaled and detailed bald-faced Victorian Style residential structure, typical of the period. The brickwork was stuccoed, and the roof was a simple pitched gable over the house's main, two-storey section. The terrace was built close to the escarpment rising to Gloucester Walk and opposite a row of four similarly modest dwellings built in 1880 by Thomas Playfair, on the street's southside. The terraces at the west end of Atherden Street would have stood in contrast to the single-storey, stone cottages built by Atherden in the 1850s immediately to the east of number 1–7 Atherden Street.

By 1882 Ebsworth had leased No. 2 Atherden Street to Walter Bell, and No. 4 to George Cook. The gross annual rating was £52 for each property. Numbers 2 and 4 first appear in the Sands Directory in 1883 showing Mr Bell's occupation as sailmaker and Cook's as a wharfinger, consistent with the demography of the area at this time. Like many of the rental properties in The Rocks area, in the 19th century the tenants of the Atherden Street houses tended to be one to three years at the most. A few tenants returned at various time to live in other houses in Atherden Street. At this time the population of The Rocks was diverse, including high numbers of immigrants, often with trades related to maritime and wharf activities. A brief survey of the names and occupations of Atherden Street tenants listed in the Sands Directory provides an indication of the backgrounds of Rocks residents of the period. Atherden Street residents included sailmaker, wharfinger, master mariner, waterman and storeman. A few had trades such as painter, engineer and blacksmith; while a number are shown as clerks.

Women's occupations shown include laundress and dressmaker. Unfortunately the Sands Directory does not indicate the diversity of women's occupations in the 19th century as women were only listed when the woman was the sole adult occupant or householder.

The Sydney Real Estate Bank Limited represented by Leonard Dodds, purchased the two properties from Ebsworth in 1888 and they continued to be leased. The bank had mortgaged the properties by 1889 and transferred them to the Perpetual Trustee Company Ltd in 1892. Council Assessment Books indicate that from c. 1896 the Perpetual Trustee Co. was the owner of 2 and 4 Atherden Street. Increasing unsanitary conditions in some parts of the city, and an outbreak of bubonic plague in late summer of 1900, resulted in a large-scale resumption of land by the Public Works Department of NSW. The aim was to selectively demolish substandard or badly planned residential and commercial buildings, followed by the replanning of some areas and selected rebuilding. A Royal Commission was appointed to gather expert evidence on the best way to effect the "Improvement of the City of Sydney and its suburbs" and its conclusions were published in 1909. On 3 October 1903 Lots 9 and 10 were resumed under the Act "in connection with a system of Public Wharves approaches thereto at Darling Harbour and the waters at Port Jackson". The Sydney Real Estate Bank Ltd, the owner of this and a number of adjacent sites (33–41 George St), had gone into voluntary liquidation in 1893 and the Perpetual Trustee Co Ltd was now the "mortgagee in possession". The Atherden and George Street properties were valued at a total of £7250, an amount accepted by the liquidator as full compensation.

The NSW Government became the official owner and landlord for the resumed properties. Resumption records relating to the valuation and assessment of the houses in Atherden Street have not been located and it can only be assumed that their construction and condition were assessed by the Public Works Department as being satisfactory and to be retained. In 1918 the Sydney Harbour Trust (known from 1936 as the Maritime Services Board) took over administration of resumed properties in the Darling Harbour - Rocks area. The remodelling of The Rocks was carried out gradually although some of it was never realised. Although numbers 2 and 4 Atherden Street and numbers 1-7 remained intact, four stone cottages, built by George Atherden in 1855 on the south side of the street at its eastern end, were demolished by the Sydney City Council in 1920–21. This allowed for the continuation of Harrington Street (this section later renamed Playfair Street in 1953) to George Street via Atherden Street; as well as for road widening. Circa 1922-23 Atherden Street was renamed Atherton Place, the name referring only to the length of roadway from Playfair Street to the cliff face to the west. The new configuration of the streets is illustrated in a City of Sydney Detail Sheet prepared in the early 1960s.

In 1969 the Sydney Cove Redevelopment Authority Act led to the formation of the Sydney Cove Redevelopment Authority in 1970 one of the responsibilities of which was the administration of The Rocks properties including 2 and 4 Atherden Street. The Authority was renamed the Sydney Cove Authority in 1991, the functions of which were assumed by the Sydney Harbour Foreshore Authority in 1999.

=== Residents of Avery Terrace ===
The history of 2 and 4 Atherden Street is intimately linked to the people who lived there. (Note: The street is generally be referred to by its current name "Atherden Street" although it is noted that for a period it was officially known as "Atherton Place".) Little more than basic information has been discovered about the late 19th century tenants of 2 and 4 Atherden Street.

In the late 19th century until the first decade of the 20th century lessees of 2 and 4 Atherden Street tended to stay for between one and three years. In contrast, in the 20th century tenants stayed far longer in the one house, some remaining in the locality for generations. Numbers 2 and 4 Atherden Street are of particular significance, becoming known as Avery Terrace due to long-term tenancy of the Avery family in one or both of the houses from c. 1917. Around 1980 the words "Avery Terrace" were signwritten in ornate upper-case typescript on the buildings. Nineteenth-century terrace houses have been known to be given the name of a property holder but rarely that of its tenants, as in this case. The Avery family's history in The Rocks dates to the late 19th century. In the 20th century Avery family members have lived in a number of houses in Atherden Street including one of George Atherden's stone cottages and in Playfair's Terrace, both on the south side of the street. John "Yankee Jack" Avery and his wife Margaret settled in The Rocks in 1878. In the 1870s Jack Avery reputedly "jumped ship" from an American vessel, marrying Margaret Long, a local woman soon after his arrival in Sydney. In 1897 the Averys were living at 89 Gloucester Street and their son William Ernest Avery and daughter-in-law, Eva at No. 83 from 1899-1900. Eva Garel's grandparents, Richard Byrne and Margaret Kelly had lived in Cumberland Street from c. 1807 in a house built by Byrne, a stonemason by trade. Although some family members moved away from The Rocks many maintained a connection – staying permanently or moving back from time-to-time. Unlike many other The Rocks residents who worked in wharf related trades, before World War I William and Eva Avery ran a tobacconist on the corner of Kendall Lane and Argyle Street.

==== No. 2 Atherden Street ====
The first tenant of 2 Atherden Street c. 1882 was Walter Bell, sailmaker, followed by Robert Jones. The house's number varies in the 1885 edition and it is likely that William Lloyd was the tenant for about three years, followed by William Walsh. Captain Williams occupied the house c. 1889 followed by William A. Grant, Master Mariner, who lived there until c. 1894. The Rocks was populated largely by people in maritime related activities and included immigrants such as Edward Gullicksen (Gulliksen) from Norway. Gullicksen, his wife Sarah and three small children called No. 2 Atherden Street home for two years. Captain James Donnelly, his wife and children moved to No. 2 c. 1901 – c. 1903. c. 1899 – c. 1900, Donnelly was living at 1 Atherden Street showing that residents moved from one house to another, in the same street, over a number of years; possibly due to varying rentals or the extent and standard of accommodation. Donnelly and his family later moved to 5 Atherden Street on the other side of the street. c. 1914 – c. 1915 William Ernest Avery was the first of the Avery family to take up residence in Atherden Street at No.13, one of George Atherden's four 1850s stone cottages. This marked the beginning of a long period of residence by the Avery family in Atherden Street. John Avery (c. 1850 – c. 1934) moved to No. 2 around the same time as William Ernest Avery (1880-1942) moved into No. 1, on the opposite side of the small street. In 1921 John, a coal-lumper, shared No. 2 with Eva Frances Avery (1881–1959), Charles Avery, a publisher, Stephen Charles Avery, a labourer, Florence Avery and Gertrude Rebecca Avery. Several generations of the family shared the household. John's occupation as a coallumper, loading coal onto or off the vessels at the wharves, would have been arduous and no doubt had health risks. It was a common occupation for men in The Rocks. The NSW Statistical Register of 1928–29 recorded that mean in this trade were earning 3s 2d per hour for a forty four hour week; amounting to £6/12/4 per week. Rent for a four-room brick house around the same time was 22 shillings and eight pence per week; just less than 20% of his wage. Charles Avery's profession, shown as a publisher stands in contrast to John's and many others who lived in The Rocks.

By 1928 fifteen adult members of Avery family were living in Atherton Place in four of the six houses numbers 1, 2, 3 and 4. It is likely that a number of children also lived there. It was not uncommon for the two bedroom terrace houses in inner city areas to accommodate an extended family of 6 to 10.

With the increasing acceptance of women in more diverse roles in the workforce, young women such as Gertrude May Avery, a packer, would have been able to make a contribution to household expenses. Stephen Avery's job, a "motor-driver", was evidence of the diversification in men's occupations and new opportunities offered with the advent of motor transport, where previous generations of the family had worked on the wharves or in manual trades. Interestingly William's World War I AIF records indicate that the Atherton Place address was recorded as Millers Point or Dawes Point at various times although there were no official suburban boundaries in the area until 1993. It is possible that this was a postal boundary. Electoral Rolls of the 1980s show Atherden Street's location as "Sydney". From c. 1928 – c. 1938 and again from c. 1950-58 four houses in Atherden Street, or Atherton Place as it had become known, were occupied by the Avery family or its descendants. As studies show, the Averys were one of many "Rocks" families to live close proximity to one another. When inner-city families did move house, it was often only a block or two away at most. It was not uncommon for family members to informally "swap" their houses, as Dolly Bonnette and her mother Eva Avery did, from No. 1 to No. 7. This might have been to suit changing accommodation needs and shows that records may not accurately reflect an individual's residence.

Living in close proximity provided a valuable support system for families in the generally close-knit community. Grace Karskens' research into the history and archaeology of The Rocks revealed that women such as Eva May Avery and her mother Catherine Garel were known for their neighbourliness, earning them the community's appreciation and respect. Atherton Place, a cul de sac ending in a large rock face, was an ideal location for street parties and it was common for the piano to be brought out with all welcome to join-in, especially at Christmas and New Year's Eve.

John Avery remained the official lessee of No. 2 until May 1944, just prior to which the rent was recorded as being 18 shillings and 6 pence per week. NSW Death Registers however indicate that John Avery died in 1934 and that tenancy records were not updated. The properties were relatively inexpensive to rent with the Maritime Services Board paying rates, taxes and insurance, and making it worthwhile for the family to retain the lease. The lease was subsequently taken on by Florence Avery (possibly John's daughter) for a short period in mid-1944 and transferred to Gertrude Crutcher (née Avery), continuing the house's connection to the family.

In 1945 Joseph Edward William "Teddy" Avery took over the lease of 2 Atherden Street. Teddy Avery (1907-1981) was the youngest of William and Eva Avery's sons and lived in The Rocks with Dorothy, his wife and their two children James and Yvonne. Like many Rocks men, Teddy worked on the wharves throughout his working life. The rent continued remained the same until 1952 when regular rate increases were instituted, starting at £1/2/6 per week. By 1961 the rent had risen to £1/13/- per week. Mrs Hazel Carmela Ballard moved into No. 2 in 1961 and nothing is known about this period of tenancy.

By 1972 George Edward Bonnette and his mother, Hannah Jane Catherine 'Dolly' Bonnette (1910-1993), had moved into No. 2 Atherden Street, opposite numbers 1 and 7, where she had been born and where they had lived at various times. Dolly (1910-1993), the seventh and last child of Eva and William Avery, was born into the extensive Avery family in 1910, living for most of her life in The Rocks. She took great pride in her "Rocks" background and in later years eagerly shared her history.

Some of her recollections were recorded in interviews by journalists, the Department of Local Government (1963–64) and the Sydney Cove Redevelopment Authority (1971), leaving a valuable record. Other sources include family history research by Val Garner, titled Irish on The Rocks: The Descendants of Richard Byrne and Margaret Kelly (1997).

As pointed out by historian Grace Karskens, although it was men's work that tied or drew families to waterside neighbourhoods like The Rocks, it was also common for women to bring their husbands to live there so they could remain near their mothers and sisters and the community they knew so well. By 1947 Dolly and George were living at 7 Atherton Place where she had been born, sharing the house with Eva Avery, Dolly's mother. Others living in the house at the time included John Frederick Avery, Dolly's nephew, as well as William James Avery (1900-1960) and his wife Agnes Esther "Aggie" Avery, Dolly's brother and sister-in-law. By this time Dolly and George had four young children, stretching the capacity of the small, two-storey terrace. It did not seem unusual for The Rocks family, and Dolly recalls that at times there were fifteen living in the house at No. 5 Atherden Street.

In the first half of the 20th century many of the married Avery women did not work outside of the home, listing their occupations in official records as home duties. A few like Margaret and Gertrude worked as packers in local warehouses, while Doreen was a shop assistant. George Bonnette, Dolly's husband was a typewriter mechanic with Stott & Underwood, unlike most of the Dolly's brothers who worked in wharf related trades. Dolly's older brother who lived with them, William "Cocka" Avery, worked as a wharf labourer, eventually working his way up to the respected position of stevedore. Dolly Bonnette revelled in the renewed interest in The Rocks that began in the 1970s, staunchly advocating the preservation of the residential precinct, protection of its close community and celebration of its colourful history. Between 1971 and 1972 Dolly moved to No. 2 Atherden Street, living next door to her son in No. 4. In 1975 the Sydney Cove Authority renovated both. Until Dolly Bonnette's death in 1993 she was the oldest living descendant of Richard and Margaret Byrne living in The Rocks.

==== No. 4 Atherden Street ====
The 1883 edition of the Sands shows George Cook, Wharfinger, as the first tenant of 4 Atherden Street, the construction of which had been commissioned by Edward Stanley Ebsworth c.1881. Cook soon vacated the two-storey, four-roomed terrace which was then leased for an equally short time by Charles Annis (or Armis) until c.1885. Short periods of residential tenancy were possibly linked to casual employment on the wharves or in businesses nearby. The description of the house as being of four rooms is thought to refer to the living areas. The services areas were included in Council assessments from 1896; however the numbering often appears arbitrary, changing from one assessment to the next. Periods of tenancy by William Meddowes, a clerk (c. 1885 – c. 1887), Thomas Webb (c. 1888) and Mrs Sophia Petersen (c. 1890 – c. 1891) followed. George Craig leased the premises c. 1894, staying there for almost a decade - unusual given late 19th century trend of short tenancies. NSW birth, death and marriage records show that George Craig and his wife, Agnes Dundas had eight children between 1870 and 1884 and it is likely that a few of the younger ones would have lived with them at Atherden Street. From 1903 tenants included John Brown (c. 1903 – c. 06), James H. McClure (c. 1906 – c. 17), Alexander Roube (c. 1908 & 1920), Carl Roux (c. 1919, 1921–23) and John Crealy (c. 1924 – c. 1927/28). The Sydney City Council's Assessment Books show the tenant as "Roux and Co" from 1924–25. Little information is known about these tenants.

In June 1928 William James "Cocka" Avery (1900–60), a wharf labourer took up the lease of No. 4 at a rental of £1/1/- per week. The rent was higher than charged for No. 2, despite the houses being the same size. It is possible that the interior of No. 4 was in better condition than the neighbouring house, although no detailed records have been located that might explain the discrepancy. The small, two-bedroom terrace was also home to Agnes Esther "Aggie" Avery, William's wife, and (Joseph) William Edward "Teddy" Avery (1908–81), William's younger brother, also a wharf labourer. As mentioned previously, by 1930 fifteen adult Avery family members were living in four of the six houses at the end of the cul de sac. By 1937 William James Avery and wife Agnes shared the house with Charles Avery, William's uncle, and Dolly and George Bonnette, William's sister and brother-in-law. Dolly's two small children added to the already large household. Eva Frances Avery took up the lease on No. 4 in January 1938 sharing the house from 1941 with daughter Eva May "Maisie" Young (1902-1950), Eva's husband George Victor Young and their three children. Maisie took over the lease in March 1942. By 1947 the house was also home to Doreen Florence Avery (b.1924), Maisie's niece. Despite her death in 1950, Maisie's name remained on the Tenancy records until November 1957. Nita Louisa Allen née Young (1929–1995), one of Maisie's three daughters, took up the lease of No. 4, living there from November 1957 until the late 1960s, continuing the house's connection to the Avery family. Nita Allen, later Nita McCrae, is recognized for her role in mobilising The Rocks community in protesting against the planned comprehensive redevelopment of the area which ignored the area's rich history and gave little consideration for its long-term residents. The plan included large-scale demolitions in the area and the construction of high-rise buildings. Nita was instrumental in the formation of the Millers Point Action Group in 1969 and The Rocks Resident Action Group in 1971. She enlisted the assistance of the builders' labourers' and workers' unions leading to the implementation and enforcement of industrial or "Green Bans" to stop the destruction of numerous culturally significant sites.

Nita McCrae and The Rocks Resident Action Group were ultimately successful in forcing the revision of the original redevelopment plans for The Rocks, saving numerous significant buildings and the oldest residential precinct in Sydney. In 1996, in the year following her death, a plaque honouring Nita McCrae's achievements was unveiled by the Minister of Urban Affairs and Planning, Craig Knowles, at her 35 George Street home where her campaign to save The Rocks had started.

From 1972, 4 Atherden Street was home to George Bonnette, Dolly Bonnette's son, and Suzanne Bonnette, however in 1974 when funds were allocated by the Sydney Cove Redevelopment Authority for renovations, the house was reported to be vacant. Building work was carried out in 1975 and further work in 1995-96. The Avery family descendants no longer live in Atherden Street, marking the end of an era. Avery Terrace remains residential, however they are not the large extended families of the early 20th century, nor are they employed in the traditional occupations that once drew them to the waterside suburb at the heart of Sydney. Despite obvious changes and the commercialisation of the area to cater for the tourist trade, the area maintains its historic residential precinct, which with a number of surviving 19th century commercial buildings, is integral to the history and character of The Rocks.

== Description ==
A pair of two storey Victorian Regency terraces, each two bays wide, constructed of stuccoed brick with simple pitched iron roofs between flanking and common brick walls. Windows have single pane sashes with flat arched heads. This and the facing terrace at 1-7 Atherden Place are built within two metres of the ten metre escarpment at the end of the street.

Style: Victorian; Storeys: 2; Roof Cladding: Corrugated Iron; Floor Frame: Timber. Potential archaeological resource

=== Modifications and dates ===
The terraces were restored and renovated in 1975. This included demolition and removal of rear fences, all timber and galvanised well and associated lean-to roof. A section of the WC outhouse and a section of the chimney were also demolished. Tar paving and concrete were removed from around the terraces and they were repaved. The internal floors were checked and floorboards removed where necessary. Subfloor spaces were cleaned where necessary and building material and miscellaneous rubbish removed. New services, plumbing and wiring were installed.

=== Further information ===
The renovations and restoration work in 1975 may have disturbed the archaeological deposits in the rear yards and sub floor spaces. However, there is no indication in the reports of large scale excavation of these areas so it is very possible that significant archaeological information is still in situ.

== Heritage listing ==
As at 30 March 2011, Avery Terrace and site are of State heritage significance for their historical and scientific cultural values. The site and building are also of State heritage significance for their contribution to The Rocks area which is of State Heritage significance in its own right. They owe their continuous existence to the esteem in which they are held by the local community, and by the wider community as evidenced by their listing on the registers of both the National Estate and the National Trust and also evidenced by the efforts in the 1970s to save them from demolition as part of the Green Ban movement.

The site of Avery Terrace is important in the history of the establishment and development of Sydney as a colony as evidence of land granted to Robert Campbell Senior in 1834 and its later subdivision and sale. Avery Terrace, 2 & 4 Atherden Street, is significant to the 19th and 20th century history of The Rocks as evidence of a small residential development commissioned by Edward Stanley Ebsworth in c.1881. Avery Terrace is important as one of a group of residential buildings surviving the demolitions that followed land resumptions under the Public Purposes Acquisition Act (1900).

Avery Terrace is significant in NSW for its long history of residential tenancy and is valued for its association with the working-class families, largely employed in maritime and wharfside occupations. Avery Terrace has a strong and special association with the Avery family who lived in Atherden Street from c.1914 and in Avery Terrace from c.1917 until 1993. The item is associated with Nita McCrae who is recognized for mobilising The Rocks community in protesting against redevelopment plans that disregarded the area's rich history and long-term residents.

The form, scale, planning and detailing of Avery Terrace are evidence of Victorian Regency Style terrace housing of The Rocks. It is notable for the high standard of construction and detailing and, despite some alterations, it remains a good example of its type. Set against the sandstone escarpment Avery Terrace, with Playfair and Argyle Terrace, make an important contribution to the late 19th century character of the streetscape. Avery Terrace is a rare example of a bald-faced, Victorian Regency Style terrace and is one of a surviving group of this style. The high quality construction and detailing is uncommon in working-class rental housing of the era and contributes to its rarity.

Avery Terrace was listed on the New South Wales State Heritage Register on 10 May 2002 having satisfied the following criteria:

The place is important in demonstrating the course, or pattern, of cultural or natural history in New South Wales.

The site is evidence of land granted to Robert Campbell Senior in 1834, and a number of stages of subdivision and sale of the Campbell Estate up until 1878. Avery Terrace, 2 & 4 Atherden Street, The Rocks demonstrates late 19th century residential development of the site by Edward Stanley Ebsworth. The terraces in Atherden Street were leased with Sergeant Majors Row, 33-41 George Street, also commissioned by Ebsworth. Avery Terrace, with Playfair and Argyle Terrace nearby, are good examples of the construction of rental housing in or near the precinct. Avery Terrace is significant for its long history of residential tenancy, never having been owner-occupied.

The site, resumed in 1903, is evidence of extensive land resumptions under the Public Purposes Acquisition Act (1900). The terrace survives as evidence of the buildings that escaped the widespread demolitions, either due to their standard or construction or usefulness as workers' rental housing administered by the Sydney Harbour Trust and subsequent authorities. The site is important in the history of the establishment and development of Sydney as a colony, while Avery Terrace is a significant to the 19th and 20th century history of The Rocks.

The place has a strong or special association with a person, or group of persons, of importance of cultural or natural history of New South Wales's history.

Avery Terrace is significant for its association with the land's earliest owners in the 19th century, as well as the houses' 20th century tenants, in particular the Avery family and Nita McCrae. In the early 19th century the site is significant for its association with large areas of land granted to Robert Campbell on the west side of Circular Quay, linked to Campbell & Co and its commercial activities. From the late 19th to the mid 20th century Avery Terrace and other houses in Atherden Street were associated with numerous tenants, many of whom were employed in maritime and wharfside occupations.

Avery Terrace has a strong association with the Avery family after which the terrace is named. The family traces its history to Richard Byrne and Margaret Kelly who settled in The Rocks c.1807. Members of the Avery family lived in Atherden Street from c.1914 and in Avery Terrace at No. from c.1917-18. One or both of the houses was occupied by an Avery family descendant until 1993. Nita McCrae, an Avery family descendant, was brought up in Atherden St, living at 4 Atherden Street as a child, and as an adult from the 1950s until c.1969-70. She is recognized for her role in mobilising The Rocks community to protest against redevelopment plans which ignored the rich history of The Rocks and giving little consideration for long-term residents.

The place is important in demonstrating aesthetic characteristics and/or a high degree of creative or technical achievement in New South Wales.

The form, scale, planning and detailing of Avery Terrace is evidence of Victorian Regency Style terrace housing of a modest size. Distinctive characteristics include its symmetrical presentation, stucco finish and subtle modelling of the façade. The high quality of its construction and detailing is unusual for rental housing of this type and is evidence of the standards set by Edward Stanley Ebsworth who commissioned its construction c.1881. Despite some alterations, including those to the interior and exterior of the rear extension, it remains a good example of Victorian terrace housing in The Rocks, sharing similar characteristics and qualities to this type of housing in east Sydney. Avery Terrace forms a group with Playfair and Argyle Terrace which are of a similar style and scale. The group retains many intact architectural elements, and survives as evidence of a late 19th century streetscape in The Rocks. Avery Terrace makes a significant contribution to the current streetscape against the backdrop of the natural sandstone escarpment to the west.

The place has a strong or special association with a particular community or cultural group in New South Wales for social, cultural or spiritual reasons.

Avery Terrace has a strong and special association with the local and wider community as evidence of Sydney's rich history; and housing leased from the late 19th by working-class families who were until the mid 20th century largely employed in wharf or maritime activities. The high social significance of Avery Terrace, and nearby 19th century buildings, is demonstrated by the community activism on a local and State level saving many from demolition in the 1970s. Avery Terrace is held in high esteem by the community at a Federal, State and local level demonstrated by its inclusion in statutory and non-statutory heritage registers, individually and as part of The Rocks.

The place has potential to yield information that will contribute to an understanding of the cultural or natural history of New South Wales.

Avery Terrace has little potential to yield information that will contribute to an understanding of the lifestyles of its working-class tenants due to considerable site disturbance from the 1970s and 1990s renovations. It is possible, however that the subfloor areas, courtyard and the former outhouse retain some archaeological deposits.

The place possesses uncommon, rare or endangered aspects of the cultural or natural history of New South Wales.

Avery Terrace is a rare example of a bald-faced, Victorian Regency Style terrace, unlike the more common Victorian Filigree style of the era, associated with decorative cast iron verandahs and plaster ornamentation. It is one of a surviving group of terraces of this style including Playfair Terrace opposite and Argyle Terrace in Playfair Street. The high quality construction and detailing of Avery Terrace is rarely associated with working-class rental housing of the era and adds to the importance of the structure.

The place is important in demonstrating the principal characteristics of a class of cultural or natural places/environments in New South Wales.

The form, scale, planning and detailing of Avery Terrace is representative of Victorian Regency Style architecture built in late 19th century Sydney, and a good example of its type.

== See also ==
- Australian residential architectural styles
