= Arthur Salter =

Arthur Salter may refer to:

- Arthur Salter, 1st Baron Salter (1881–1975), British politician and academic, Member of Parliament 1937–1950 and 1951–1953
- Arthur Salter (judge) (1859–1928), Member of Parliament for Basingstoke in 1906–1917, High Court Judge 1917–1928
