= Denzil Freeth =

British politician

Denzil Kingston Freeth MBE (10 July 1924 – 26 April 2010) was a British Conservative politician.

Born in the Paddington area of London, Freeth was educated at Sherborne School and then served in the Royal Air Force. In 1946, he went up to Trinity Hall, Cambridge. Whilst at Cambridge University he became President of the Cambridge Union.

He was Member of Parliament for Basingstoke from 1955 until he stood down in 1964. He was appointed Parliamentary Secretary for Science in 1961 and was involved in setting up the Trent Committee.

Freeth asked the first-ever question about deafblind people in the House of Commons in 1964, when he asked the Government, local authorities, and the public to give people with the condition more attention and support.

After leaving parliament he worked as a stockbroker. Freeth served for nearly 20 years as a Churchwarden of the leading London Anglo-Catholic Church, All Saints, Margaret Street.

== Averted scandals ==
In 1962, Freeth was arrested wandering the streets naked near his flat in Pimlico, a conduct he explained as being due to worry over the health of his mother.

According to Michael McManus's book on the history of Conservative attitudes to homosexuality, Freeth was gay. His homosexuality had been discovered by Lord Denning who, in the wake of the Profumo affair (1963), had been tasked by Prime Minister Harold Macmillan with identifying other ministers who might be 'security risks'.

Although the information was not made public at the time to avoid scandal, Denning's discovery (that Freeth had been present at homosexual parties also attended by John Vassall), resulted in Freeth being quietly removed from office when Macmillan retired, and asked to give up his seat at the 1964 general election.

Parliament of the United Kingdom
| Preceded by Patrick Donner | Member of Parliament for Basingstoke; 1955–1964 | Succeeded by David Mitchell |
