= 1887 Basingstoke by-election =

UK parliamentary by-election

The 1887 Basingstoke by-election was held on 18 July 1887 after the incumbent Conservative MP George Sclater-Booth became the first Baron Basing. The seat was retained by the Conservative candidate Arthur Frederick Jeffreys.

Basingstoke by-election, 1887
Party	Candidate	Votes	%	±%
Conservative	Arthur Frederick Jeffreys	3,158	56.6	N/A
Liberal	R. Eve	2,426	43.4	N/A
Majority		732	13.2	N/A
Turnout		5,584	69.6	N/A
Conservative hold		Swing	N/A	
