= Arthur Holbrook =

British newspaper proprietor and Conservative MP

Arthur Holbrook

Colonel Sir Arthur Richard Holbrook, KBE VD JP DL (28 April 1850 – 24 December 1946) was a British newspaper proprietor and Conservative MP for Basingstoke.

He won the seat at a by-election in 1920, lost it in 1923, was re-elected in 1924, and stood down in 1929.

He was a newspaper proprietor; founder of the Southern Daily Mail; Fellow of the Institute of Journalists; President of the Newspaper Society, 1913–14; Chairman of Portsmouth Conservative Association, 1885–98; and President of Portsmouth Chamber of Commerce, 1907–12. He commanded the Royal Army Service Corps, Salisbury Plain District, 1914–19.

Parliament of the United Kingdom
| Preceded by Reginald Fletcher | Member of Parliament for Basingstoke; 1924–1929 | Succeeded by Gerard Wallop |
| Preceded by Auckland Geddes | Member of Parliament for Basingstoke; 1920–1923 | Succeeded by Reginald Fletcher |
