= 1917 Basingstoke by-election =

UK Parliamentary by-election

The 1917 Basingstoke by-election was held on 25 October 1917. The by-election was held due to the incumbent Conservative MP, Arthur Salter, becoming a Judge on the High Court of Justice. It was won by the Conservative candidate Sir Auckland Geddes, who was unopposed due to a War-time electoral pact.
