= Basingstoke (constituency) =

Parliamentary constituency in the United Kingdom, 1885 onwards

Coordinates: 51.256°N 1.13°W

- Borough constituency for the House of Commons
- Boundaries since 2024
- Boundary of Basingstoke in South East England
- County: Hampshire
- Population: 107,996 (2011 census)
- Electorate: 77,050 (2023)
- Major settlements: Basingstoke, East Oakley

Current constituency
- Created: 1885
- Member of Parliament: Luke Murphy (Labour)
- Seats: One
- Created from: North Hampshire

Basingstoke (/ˈbeɪzɪŋˌstoʊk/) is a constituency in Hampshire represented in the House of Commons of the UK Parliament since 2024 by Luke Murphy, a member of the Labour Party. (Note: As with all constituencies, the first past the post system of election is used with elections at least every five years.)

== Constituency profile ==
The constituency is located within the Basingstoke and Deane local government district in Hampshire. It contains most of the large town of Basingstoke and extends into rural areas to the west of the town, including the village of Oakley.

Basingstoke is a historic market town that was significantly expanded after World War II to accommodate the London overspill. Residents are generally wealthier than the national average and have a similar ethnic makeup to the country as a whole. Local politics are mixed, with Conservative, Labour and Liberal Democrat councillors all being elected in the town at the most recent borough council election in 2024. The constituency is estimated to have voted marginally in favour of leaving the European Union in the 2016 referendum, similar to the national average.

== History ==
=== Political history ===
Historically, Basingstoke has been a Conservative safe seat, but in 2024 it elected a Labour MP for the first time in its history. With the exception of this and a Liberal MP being elected in 1923, it has elected Conservative MPs since the seat was created in 1885. The closest it came to a non-Conservative victory in the century between was in 2001, when its incumbent since 1983, Andrew Hunter, in his final election, was returned by 880 votes. Hunter notably crossed the floor in 2004 to join the Democratic Unionist Party, a party which traditionally only runs in Northern Ireland.

In June 2016, an estimated 53.6% of local adults voting in the EU membership referendum chose to leave the European Union instead of to remain.

=== Content and regional context ===
The town was represented in the Model Parliament convened in 1295 but not again until the modern seat was created in 1885 which was done on a broad contents basis. From 1295 inclusive (Note: Burgesses (ie freeholders in boroughs could elect their borough member and county members.) to the one year parliament of 1831–32 its area was part of the Hampshire constituency or election of knights of the shire as the event was more often called and from 1832 to 1885 its area lay in the North Hampshire constituency.

== Boundaries ==
Map of boundaries 2010–2024

1885–1918: The Borough of Basingstoke, and the Sessional Divisions of Basingstoke and Odiham.

1918–1950: The Boroughs of Basingstoke and Andover, and the Rural Districts of Andover, Basingstoke, Kingsclere, Stockbridge, and Whitchurch.

1950–1955: The Boroughs of Basingstoke and Andover, the Rural Districts of Andover, Basingstoke, and Kingsclere and Whitchurch, and in the Rural District of Romsey and Stockbridge the parishes of Ashley, Bossington, Broughton, Buckholt, East Tytherley, Frenchmoor, Houghton, King's Somborne, Leckford, Little Somborne, Longstock, Nether Wallop, Over Wallop, Stockbridge, and West Tytherley.

1955–1974: The Boroughs of Basingstoke and Andover, and the Rural Districts of Andover, Basingstoke, and Kingsclere and Whitchurch.

1974–1983: The Borough of Basingstoke, the Rural Districts of Basingstoke, and Kingsclere and Whitchurch, and in the Rural District of Hartley Wintney the parishes of Bramshill, Dogmersfield, Eversley, Greywell, Hartley Wintney, Heckfield, Hook, Long Sutton, Mattingley, Odiham, Rotherwick, South Warnborough, and Winchfield. Note: among these Hook was by 1983 commonly considered a town.

1983–1997: The Borough of Basingstoke and Deane wards of Basing, Black Dam, Bramley, Brighton Hill, Buckskin, Chapel, Daneshill, Eastrop, Farleigh Wallop, Kempshott, King's Furlong, Norden, North Waltham, Oakley, Pamber, Popley, Sherborne St John, Sherfield on Loddon, Silchester, South Ham, Upton Grey, Viables, Westside, and Winklebury.

1997–2010: The Borough of Basingstoke and Deane wards of Basing, Brighton Hill, Brookvale, Buckskin, Calleva, Chineham, Eastrop, Grove, Hatch Warren, Kempshott, Norden, Popley, South Ham, Upton Grey, and Winklebury.

2010–2024: The Borough of Basingstoke and Deane wards of Basing, Brighton Hill North, Brighton Hill South, Brookvale and King's Furlong, Buckskin, Chineham, Eastrop, Grove, Hatch Warren and Beggarwood, Kempshott, Norden, Popley East, Popley West, Rooksdown, South Ham, and Winklebury.

2024–present: Further to the 2023 review of Westminster constituencies, which came into effect for the 2024 general election, the constituency is composed of the following (as they existed on 1 December 2020):

- The Borough of Basingstoke and Deane wards of: Brighton Hill; Brookvale & Kings Furlong; Chineham; Eastrop & Grove; Hatch Warren & Beggarwood; Kempshott & Buckskin; Norden; Oakley & The Candovers (polling districts OC01, OC03, OC04, OC05, OC06, OC07, OC08, OC09 and OC11); Popley; South Ham; Winklebury & Manydown.

To bring the electorate within the permitted range, Old Basing was transferred to North East Hampshire. The suburb of Rooksdown was transferred to North West Hampshire in exchange for the village of Oakley.

== Members of Parliament ==
North Hampshire prior to 1885

Election	Member	Party
1885	George Sclater-Booth	Conservative
1887 by-election	Arthur Frederick Jeffreys	Conservative
1906	Arthur Salter	Conservative
1917 by-election	Auckland Geddes	Unionist
1920 by-election	Arthur Holbrook	Coalition Conservative
1923	Reginald Fletcher	Liberal
1924	Arthur Holbrook	Conservative
1929	Gerard Wallop	Conservative
1934 by-election	Henry Drummond Wolff	Conservative
1935	Patrick Donner	Conservative
1955	Denzil Freeth	Conservative
1964	David Mitchell	Conservative
1983	Andrew Hunter	Conservative
2002	Andrew Hunter	Independent Conservative
2004	Andrew Hunter	Democratic Unionist
2005	Maria Miller	Conservative
2024	Luke Murphy	Labour

== Elections ==
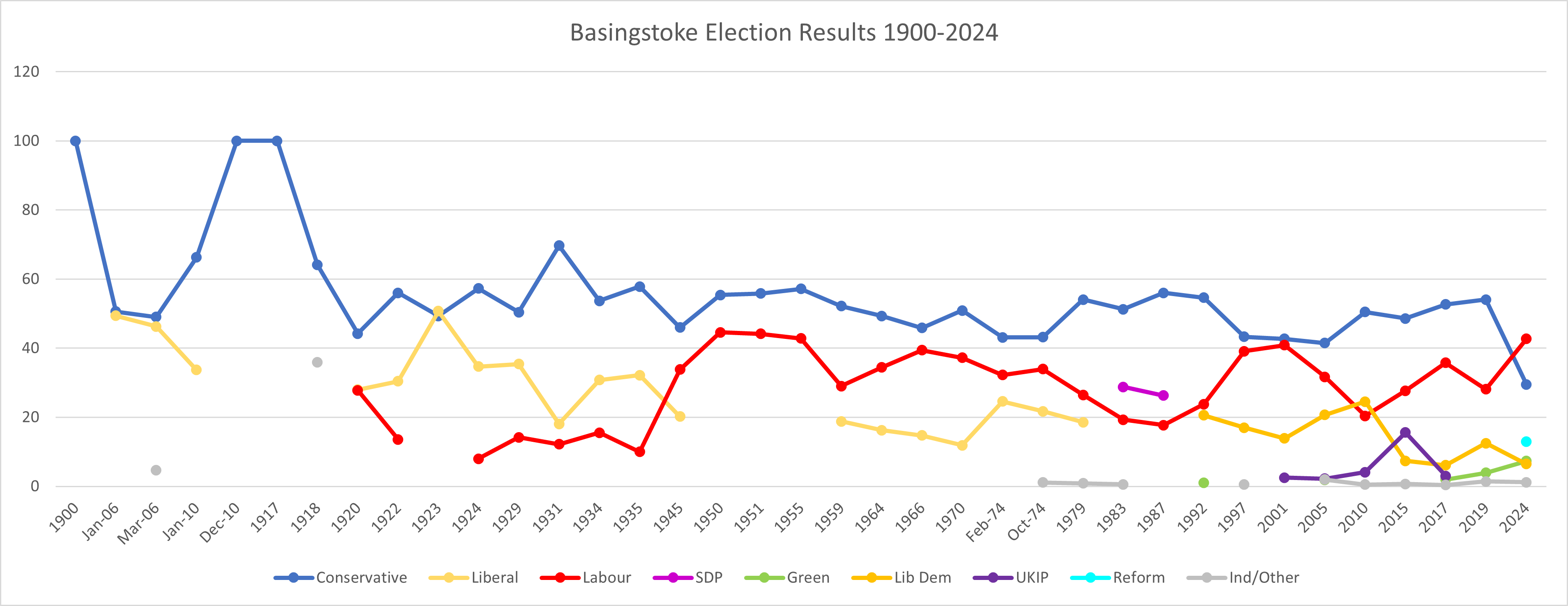
Basingstoke Election Results 1900-2024

=== Elections in the 2020s ===
General election 2024: Basingstoke
Party	Candidate	Votes	%	±%
Labour	Luke Murphy	20,922	42.7	▲14.0
Conservative	Maria Miller	14,438	29.5	▼23.2
Reform	Ray Saint (Note: Reform UK withdrew support for Saint on 27 June, after it was revealed that he was a former member of the British National Party. As this was after nominations for the election had closed, Saint remained on the ballot as the Reform UK candidate.)	6,314	12.9	new
Green	Michael Howard-Sorrell	3,568	7.3	▲3.4
Liberal Democrats	Richard Whelan	3,176	6.5	▼6.8
Hampshire Ind.	Alan Stone	571	1.2	new
Majority		6,484	13.2	
Turnout		48,989	62.4	▼4.0
Registered electors		78,487		
Labour gain from Conservative		Swing	▲18.6	

=== Elections in the 2010s ===
2019 notional result
Party	Vote	%
Conservative	26,966	52.7
Labour	14,665	28.7
Liberal Democrats	6,797	13.3
Green	2,007	3.9
Others	746	1.5
Turnout	51,181	66.4
Electorate	77,050	

General election 2019: Basingstoke
Party	Candidate	Votes	%	±%
Conservative	Maria Miller	29,593	54.1	+1.4
Labour	Kerena Marchant	15,395	28.1	−7.7
Liberal Democrats	Sashi Mylvaganam	6,841	12.5	+6.4
Green	Jonnie Jenkin	2,138	3.9	+1.9
Independent	Alan Stone	746	1.4	New
Majority		14,198	26.0	+9.1
Turnout		54,713	66.0	−2.3
Conservative hold		Swing	+4.5	

General election 2017: Basingstoke
Party	Candidate	Votes	%	±%
Conservative	Maria Miller	29,510	52.7	+4.1
Labour	Terry Bridgeman	20,044	35.8	+8.1
Liberal Democrats	John Shaw	3,406	6.1	−1.3
UKIP	Alan Stone	1,681	3.0	−12.6
Green	Richard Winter	1,106	2.0	New
Libertarian	Scott Neville	213	0.4	New
Majority		9,466	16.9	−4.0
Turnout		55,960	68.3	+1.7
Conservative hold		Swing	−2.0	

General election 2015: Basingstoke
Party	Candidate	Votes	%	±%
Conservative	Maria Miller	25,769	48.6	−1.9
Labour	Paul Harvey	14,706	27.7	+7.3
UKIP	Alan Stone	8,290	15.6	+11.5
Liberal Democrats	Janice Spalding	3,919	7.4	−17.1
Independent	Omar Selim	392	0.7	New
Majority		11,063	20.9	−5.1
Turnout		53,076	66.6	−0.5
Conservative hold		Swing	−4.6	

For the 2015 election, the Green Party attempted to field two candidates who would job share. Sarah Cope had young children and Clare Lorraine Phipps is disabled, so neither could work as a full-time MP. Their application was rejected.

General election 2010: Basingstoke
Party	Candidate	Votes	%	±%
Conservative	Maria Miller	25,590	50.5	+11.7
Liberal Democrats	John Shaw	12,414	24.5	+2.6
Labour	Funda Pepperell	10,327	20.4	−12.2
UKIP	Stella Howell	2,076	4.1	+1.9
Basingstoke Common Man	Steve Saul	247	0.5	New
Majority		13,176	26.0	
Turnout		50,654	67.1	+6.2
Conservative hold		Swing	+4.6	

=== Elections in the 2000s ===
General election 2005: Basingstoke
Party	Candidate	Votes	%	±%
Conservative	Maria Miller	19,955	41.5	−1.2
Labour	Paul Harvey	15,275	31.7	−9.2
Liberal Democrats	Jen Smith	9,952	20.7	+6.8
UKIP	Peter Effer	1,044	2.2	−0.3
Green	Darren Shirley	928	1.9	New
BNP	Roger Robertson	821	1.7	New
Millennium Council	Roger MacNair	148	0.3	New
Majority		4,680	9.8	+8.0
Turnout		48,123	63.0	+2.3
Conservative hold		Swing	+3.9	

General election 2001: Basingstoke
Party	Candidate	Votes	%	±%
Conservative	Andrew Hunter	20,490	42.7	−0.6
Labour	Jon Hartley	19,610	40.9	+1.8
Liberal Democrats	Steve Sollitt	6,693	13.9	−3.1
UKIP	Kim Graham	1,202	2.5	New
Majority		880	1.8	−2.4
Turnout		47,995	60.7	−13.4
Conservative hold		Swing	−1.2	

=== Elections in the 1990s ===
General election 1997: Basingstoke
Party	Candidate	Votes	%	±%
Conservative	Andrew Hunter	24,751	43.3	−11.3
Labour	Nigel Lickley	22,354	39.1	+15.3
Liberal Democrats	Martin Rimmer	9,714	17.0	−3.6
Independent	Elsayed Selim	310	0.6	New
Majority		2,397	4.2	−24.2
Turnout		57,129	74.1	
Conservative hold		Swing		

General election 1992: Basingstoke
Party	Candidate	Votes	%	±%
Conservative	Andrew Hunter	37,521	54.6	−1.4
Labour	David Bull	16,323	23.8	+6.1
Liberal Democrats	Chris I. Curtis	14,119	20.6	−5.7
Green	Valerie J. Oldaker	714	1.0	New
Majority		21,198	30.8	+1.1
Turnout		68,677	82.8	+5.8
Conservative hold		Swing	−3.7	

=== Elections in the 1980s ===
General election 1987: Basingstoke
Party	Candidate	Votes	%	±%
Conservative	Andrew Hunter	33,657	56.0	+4.7
SDP	David Bennett	15,764	26.3	−2.5
Labour	Peter Daden	10,632	17.7	−1.5
Majority		17,893	29.7	+7.2
Turnout		60,053	77.0	+0.2
Conservative hold		Swing		

General election 1983: Basingstoke
Party	Candidate	Votes	%	±%
Conservative	Andrew Hunter	28,381	51.3	
SDP	Ednyfed Hudson Davies	15,931	28.8	
Labour	James McAllister	10,646	19.3	
BNP	I. Wilson	344	0.6	N/A
Majority		12,450	22.5	
Turnout		55,302	76.8	
Conservative hold		Swing		

=== Elections in the 1970s ===
General election 1979: Basingstoke
Party	Candidate	Votes	%	±%
Conservative	David Mitchell	42,625	54.1	+10.9
Labour	R.W. Harris	20,879	26.5	−7.4
Liberal	P. Clatworthy	14,605	18.54	−3.2
National Front	B. Packer	677	0.86	−0.2
Majority		21,746	27.6	+18.4
Turnout		78,786	79.48	+2.0
Conservative hold		Swing		

General election October 1974: Basingstoke
Party	Candidate	Votes	%	±%
Conservative	David Mitchell	29,038	43.17	
Labour	T.E. Hunt	22,826	33.94	
Liberal	N.A.L. Whitbread	14,636	21.76	
National Front	G. Goodall	763	1.13	New
Majority		6,212	9.23	
Turnout		67,263	77.51	
Conservative hold		Swing		

General election February 1974: Basingstoke
Party	Candidate	Votes	%	±%
Conservative	David Mitchell	30,886	43.15	
Labour	T.E. Hunt	23,089	32.26	
Liberal	N.A.L. Whitbread	17,598	24.59	
Majority		7,797	10.89	
Turnout		71,553	83.24	
Conservative hold		Swing		

General election 1970: Basingstoke
Party	Candidate	Votes	%	±%
Conservative	David Mitchell	35,138	50.94	
Labour	Denis Carter	25,664	37.21	
Liberal	Ray A. Musselwhite	8,138	11.86	
Majority		9,474	13.73	
Turnout		68,940	75.02	
Conservative hold		Swing		

=== Elections in the 1960s ===
General election 1966: Basingstoke
Party	Candidate	Votes	%	±%
Conservative	David Mitchell	26,076	45.85	
Labour	Alec J. Kazantzis	22,417	39.42	
Liberal	John W. Matthew	8,379	14.73	
Majority		3,659	6.43	
Turnout		56,872	78.56	
Conservative hold		Swing		

General election 1964: Basingstoke
Party	Candidate	Votes	%	±%
Conservative	David Mitchell	26,466	49.32	
Labour	Brian Tilley	18,490	34.46	
Liberal	Basil Goldstone	8,708	16.23	
Majority		7,976	14.86	
Turnout		53,664	78.12	
Conservative hold		Swing		

=== Elections in the 1950s ===
General election 1959: Basingstoke
Party	Candidate	Votes	%	±%
Conservative	Denzil Freeth	25,314	52.18	
Labour	Sydney G. Conbeer	14,070	29.00	
Liberal	Leslie Gascoinge Housden	9,126	18.81	New
Majority		11,244	23.18	
Turnout		48,510	79.55	
Conservative hold		Swing		

General election 1955: Basingstoke
Party	Candidate	Votes	%	±%
Conservative	Denzil Freeth	24,973	57.20	
Labour	William Royle	18,683	42.80	
Majority		6,290	14.40	
Turnout		43,656	76.55	
Conservative hold		Swing		

General election 1951: Basingstoke
Party	Candidate	Votes	%	±%
Conservative	Patrick Donner	26,045	55.86	
Labour	Arthur Carr	20,580	44.14	
Majority		5,465	11.72	
Turnout		46,625	79.86	
Conservative hold		Swing		

General election 1950: Basingstoke
Party	Candidate	Votes	%	±%
Conservative	Patrick Donner	25,151	55.39	
Labour	Marjorie Clark	20,257	44.61	
Majority		4,894	10.78	
Turnout		45,408	79.53	
Conservative hold		Swing		

=== Elections in the 1940s ===
General election 1945: Basingstoke
Party	Candidate	Votes	%	±%
Conservative	Patrick Donner	18,700	46.0	−11.8
Labour	Edith Alice Weston	13,763	33.8	+23.8
Liberal	David Reginald Rhys	8,206	20.2	−12.0
Majority		4,937	12.2	−13.5
Turnout		40,669		
Conservative hold		Swing		

=== Elections in the 1930s ===
General election 1935: Basingstoke
Party	Candidate	Votes	%	±%
Conservative	Patrick Donner	18,549	57.83	
Liberal	John Foot	10,317	32.17	
Labour	James Silas William Whybrew	3,207	10.00	
Majority		8,232	25.66	
Turnout		32,073	67.44	
Conservative hold		Swing		

1934 Basingstoke by-election
Party	Candidate	Votes	%	±%
Conservative	Henry Drummond Wolff	16,147	53.7	−16.0
Liberal	John Foot	9,262	30.8	+12.7
Labour	James William Barker	4,663	15.5	+3.3
Majority		6,885	22.9	−28.7
Turnout		30,072	64.4	−3.0
Conservative hold		Swing	-14.4	

General election 1931: Basingstoke
Party	Candidate	Votes	%	±%
Conservative	Gerard Wallop	23,523	69.7	+19.3
Liberal	Frances Josephy	6,106	18.1	−17.3
Labour	C A Goatcher	4,124	12.2	−2.0
Majority		17,417	51.6	+36.6
Turnout		33,753	67.44	−6.8
Conservative hold		Swing		

=== Election in the 1920s ===
General election 1929: Basingstoke
Party	Candidate	Votes	%	±%
Unionist	Gerard Wallop	16,547	50.4	−6.9
Liberal	Laurence Harry Duniam Jones	11,595	35.4	+0.7
Labour	W. J. Beck	4,650	14.2	+6.2
Majority		4,952	15.0	−7.6
Turnout		32.792	74.2	−4.1
Unionist hold		Swing	−3.9	

General election 1924: Basingstoke
Party	Candidate	Votes	%	±%
Unionist	Arthur Holbrook	15,558	57.3	+8.0
Liberal	Reginald Fletcher	9,429	34.7	−16.0
Labour	Ben Greene	2,172	8.0	New
Majority		6,129	22.6	N/A
Turnout		27,159	78.3	+9.5
Unionist gain from Liberal		Swing		

General election 1923: Basingstoke
Party	Candidate	Votes	%	±%
Liberal	Reginald Fletcher	11,879	50.7	+20.3
Unionist	Arthur Holbrook	11,531	49.3	−6.7
Majority		348	1.4	N/A
Turnout		23,410	68.8	+1.9
Liberal gain from Unionist		Swing	+13.5	

General election 1922: Basingstoke
Party	Candidate	Votes	%	±%
Unionist	Arthur Holbrook	12,514	56.0	+11.8
Liberal	Reginald Fletcher	6,780	30.4	+2.4
Labour	Samuel Ledbury	3,035	13.6	−14.2
Majority		5,734	25.6	+10.4
Turnout		22,329	66.9	+6.9
Unionist hold		Swing	+9.7	

1920 Basingstoke by-election
Party		Candidate	Votes	%	±%
C	Unionist	Arthur Richard Holbrook	8,515	44.2	−19.9
	Liberal	Harry Verney	5,393	28.0	New
	Labour	J H Round	5,352	27.8	New
Majority			3,122	16.2	−12.0
Turnout			19,260	60.0	+4.8
	Unionist hold		Swing	−6.0	
C indicates candidate endorsed by the coalition government.

=== Election in the 1910s ===
General election 1918: Basingstoke
Party		Candidate	Votes	%	±%
C	Unionist	Auckland Geddes	11,218	64.1	N/A
	Independent Labour	A. Close	6,277	35.9	New
Majority			4,941	28.2	N/A
Turnout			17,495	55.2	N/A
	Unionist hold		Swing		
C indicates candidate endorsed by the coalition government.

== Election results, 1885–1918 ==
=== Elections in the 1880s ===
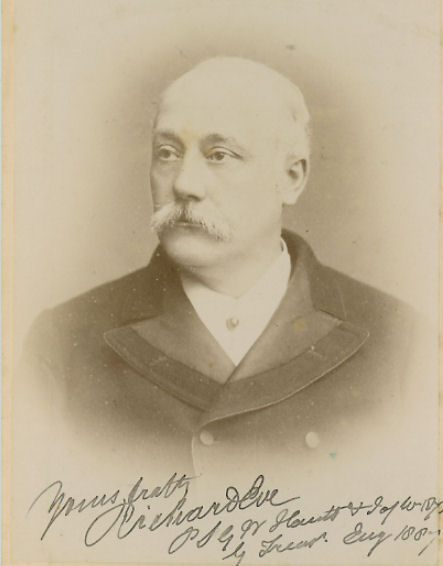
Eve

General election 1885: Basingstoke
Party	Candidate	Votes	%	±%
Conservative	George Sclater-Booth	3,892	62.7	
Liberal	Richard Eve	2,313	37.3	
Majority		1,579	25.4	
Turnout		6,205	80.4	
Registered electors		7,720		
Conservative win (new seat)				

General election 1886: Basingstoke
Party	Candidate	Votes	%	±%
Conservative	George Sclater-Booth	Unopposed		
Conservative hold				

Sclater-Booth was elevated to the peerage, becoming Lord Basing, requiring a by-election.

Jeffreys

1887 Basingstoke by-election
Party	Candidate	Votes	%	±%
Conservative	Arthur Frederick Jeffreys	3,158	56.6	N/A
Liberal	Richard Eve	2,426	43.4	New
Majority		732	13.2	N/A
Turnout		5,584	69.6	N/A
Registered electors		8,021		
Conservative hold		Swing	N/A	

=== Elections in the 1890s ===
General election 1892: Basingstoke
Party	Candidate	Votes	%	±%
Conservative	Arthur Frederick Jeffreys	4,046	61.3	N/A
Liberal	George Judd	2,555	38.7	N/A
Majority		1,491	22.6	N/A
Turnout		6,601	72.5	N/A
Registered electors		9,110		
Conservative hold		Swing	N/A	

General election 1895: Basingstoke
Party	Candidate	Votes	%	±%
Conservative	Arthur Frederick Jeffreys	Unopposed		
Conservative hold				

=== Elections in the 1900s ===
General election 1900: Basingstoke
Party	Candidate	Votes	%	±%
Conservative	Arthur Frederick Jeffreys	Unopposed		
Conservative hold				

General election 1906: Basingstoke
Party	Candidate	Votes	%	±%
Conservative	Arthur Frederick Jeffreys	4,825	50.6	N/A
Liberal	Harry Verney	4,705	49.4	New
Majority		120	1.2	N/A
Turnout		9,530	79.1	N/A
Registered electors		12,049		
Conservative hold		Swing	N/A	

Verney

1906 Basingstoke by-election
Party	Candidate	Votes	%	±%
Conservative	Arthur Salter	4,852	49.0	−1.6
Liberal	Harry Verney	4,593	46.3	−3.1
Independent Liberal	J. Ernest Polden	467	4.7	New
Majority		259	2.7	+1.5
Turnout		9,912	82.3	+3.2
Registered electors		12,049		
Conservative hold		Swing	+0.7	

=== Elections in the 1910s ===
General election January 1910: Basingstoke
Party	Candidate	Votes	%	±%
Conservative	Arthur Salter	7,506	66.3	+15.7
Liberal	John Ernest Wallis	3,821	33.7	−15.7
Majority		3,685	32.6	+31.4
Turnout		11,327	86.2	+7.1
Conservative hold		Swing	+14.9	

General election December 1910: Basingstoke
Party	Candidate	Votes	%	±%
Conservative	Arthur Salter	Unopposed		
Conservative hold				

General Election 1914–15:

Another General Election was required to take place before the end of 1915. The political parties had been making preparations for an election to take place and by July 1914, the following candidates had been selected;

- Unionist: Arthur Salter
- Liberal:

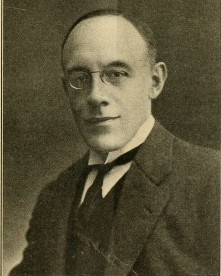
Geddes

1917 Basingstoke by-election
Party	Candidate	Votes	%	±%
Conservative	Auckland Geddes	Unopposed		
Conservative hold				

== See also ==
- Parliamentary constituencies in Hampshire
- Parliamentary constituencies in South East England
