= Luke Murphy (politician) =

British politician

Luke Murphy MP
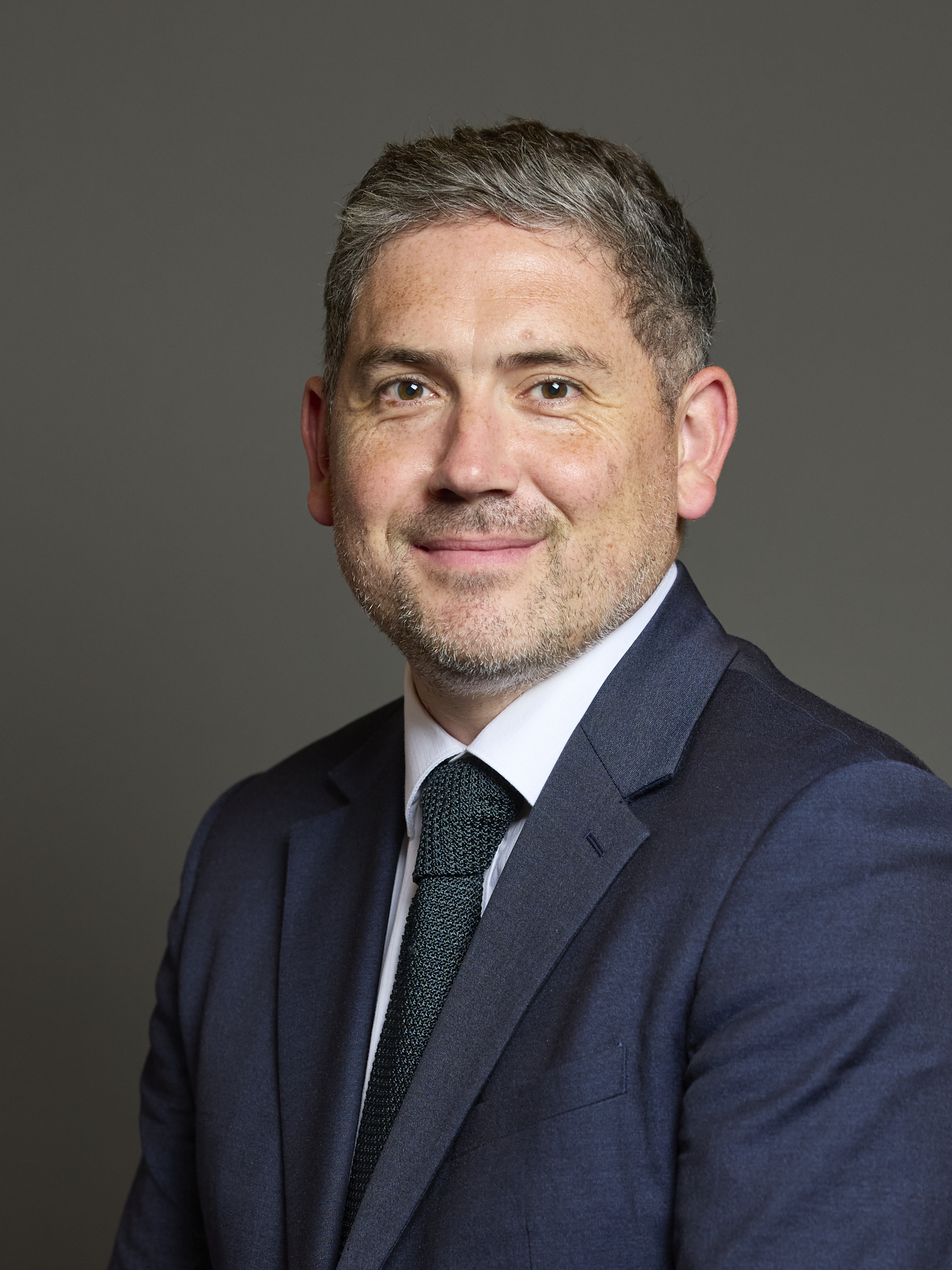
- Official portrait, 2024

Member of Parliament for Basingstoke
- Incumbent
- Assumed office 4 July 2024
- Preceded by: Maria Miller
- Majority: 6,484 (13.2%)

Member of Lambeth London Borough Council for Gipsy Hill
- In office 9 June 2016 – 3 May 2018

Personal details
- Party: Labour
- Education: University of Bath (BSc); SOAS University of London (MSc)
- Website: lukemurphy.org.uk

Luke Sean Murphy is a British Labour politician who has served as the Member of Parliament for Basingstoke since the 2024 general election.

== Early life ==
Murphy graduated with a Bachelor of Science (BSc) in Politics and Economics from the University of Bath and a Master of Science (MSc) in International Politics from SOAS University of London.

From 2016 until his election as an MP in 2024, Murphy worked for the Institute for Public Policy Research as the head of the Fair Transition Unit and leader of the energy, climate, housing and infrastructure team. Prior to this he had served as a policy and political advisor to members of Ed Miliband's Shadow Cabinet, focusing on policy related to housing, local government and devolution. He has also worked on policy and advocacy projects for the Living Wage Foundation.

== Parliamentary career ==
Murphy was selected as the Labour prospective parliamentary candidate for Basingstoke in February 2024 after the previous candidate, David Lawrence, resigned for personal reasons in November 2023.

Murphy won the seat of Basingstoke for the Labour Party in the 2024 general election, unseating the Conservative Party incumbent Maria Miller and becoming the constituency's first Labour MP. He earned a majority of 6,484, 42.7% of the vote and a 14% swing for Labour from the 2019 general election.

Murphy currently chairs the all-party parliamentary group on climate change. He has also been a member of the Energy Security and Net Zero Select Committee since October 2024.

Murphy endorsed Bridget Phillipson in the 2025 Labour Party deputy leadership election.

In March 2026, Murphy was appointed as a parliamentary private secretary to the Department for Transport.

== Personal life ==
Murphy is bisexual. In 2024, PinkNews listed Murphy among a number of LGBTQ+ parliamentarians.

Parliament of the United Kingdom
Preceded by Maria Miller	Member of Parliament for Basingstoke; 2024–present	Incumbent
