= North West Hampshire =

UK Parliament constituency (since 1983)

Coordinates: 51.3°N 1.32°W

- County constituency for the House of Commons
- Boundaries since 2010
- Boundary of North West Hampshire in South East England
- County: Hampshire
- Electorate: 76,004 (2023)
- Major settlements: Andover; Tadley; Whitchurch

Current constituency
- Created: 1983
- Member of Parliament: Kit Malthouse (Conservative)
- Created from: Winchester; Basingstoke

North West Hampshire is a constituency (Note: A county constituency (for the purposes of election expenses and type of returning officer)) represented in the House of Commons of the UK Parliament since 2015 by Conservative Kit Malthouse, who served as Education Secretary in 2022. (Note: As with all constituencies, the constituency elects one Member of Parliament (MP) by the first past the post system of election at least every five years.)

== Constituency profile ==
North West Hampshire is a constituency in Hampshire in South East England, covering parts of the Test Valley and Basingstoke and Deane local government districts. Its largest town is Andover, which has a population of around 51,000. Other settlements include the towns of Whitchurch and Tadley, the villages of Overton and Kingsclere and the Basingstoke suburb of Rooksdown.

This is a mostly rural constituency with many small villages. Most of the constituency is part of the North Wessex Downs, a National Landscape of rolling chalk hills. Andover was traditionally a centre for the wool trade and today has a significant military presence; the town is the site of Marlborough Lines, the headquarters of the British Army. Whitchurch is a historic market town and Tadley is located adjacent to AWE Nuclear Security Technologies, the Ministry of Defence's nuclear weapons research facility. Whilst the facility is located just outside this constituency, many of its employees live in Tadley and the town was largely developed to accommodate them. There is some deprivation in the northern suburbs of Andover, which contain a large quantity of council housing, however the constituency is generally affluent, especially so in the rural areas. House prices here are lower than the rest of South East England but higher than the UK average.

North West Hampshire has an above-average proportion of middle-aged adults and a low proportion of young adults. Residents have high levels of income and average rates of homeownership. The child poverty rate is around half the UK-wide figure. Residents have average levels of education and a high proportion work in the health, transport and defence sectors. The percentage claiming unemployment benefits is low. White people made up 92% of the population at the 2021 census.

Most of the constituency is represented by Conservatives at the local council level, with some Liberal Democrats elected in the Tadley area. An estimated 53% of voters in North West Hampshire supported leaving the European Union in the 2016 referendum, similar to the UK-wide figure of 52%.

== History ==
This constituency's results suggest a Conservative safe seat since its creation for the 1983 general election. The outgoing MP for Basingstoke, David Mitchell, was elected the first MP as he chose to represent the area carved out from the old seat, where he lived instead, and served for fourteen years. On Sir David Mitchell's retirement in 1997 George Young won the seat and held it until his resignation in 2015. Young was previously MP for the marginal constituency of Ealing, Acton from 1974 to 1997, and was Transport Secretary in the Government of John Major from 1995 to 1997. He also ran for Speaker of the House in 2000 and 2009, being defeated on both occasions. Young was appointed Leader of the House of Commons in the coalition government following the 2010 general election, but returned to the backbenches in David Cameron's cabinet reshuffle of 4 September 2012 and returned to the government frontbenches as Chief Whip a few weeks later, in October 2012 in place of Mitchell's son Andrew Mitchell. In 2015, Young was succeeded by Kit Malthouse, also a Conservative.

The 2010 result placed the seat 31st of the 307 Conservative seats by share of the vote polled.

== Boundaries ==
Map of 2010–2024 boundaries

1983–1997: The Borough of Test Valley wards of Alamein, Anna, Bourne Valley, Dun Valley, Harewood, Harrow Way, Kings Somborne and Michelmersh, Millway, Nether Wallop and Broughton, Over Wallop, St Mary's, Stockbridge, Tedworth, Weyhill, and Winton, and the Borough of Basingstoke and Deane wards of Baughurst, Burghclere, East Woodhay, Kingsclere, Overton, St Mary Bourne, Tadley Central, Tadley North, Tadley South, and Whitchurch.

1997–2010: The Borough of Test Valley wards of Alamein, Anna, Bourne Valley, Harrow Way, Millway, St Mary's, Tedworth, Weyhill, and Winton, and the Borough of Basingstoke and Deane wards of Baughurst and Heath End, Burghclere, East Woodhay, Highclere and Bourne, Kingsclere, Oakley and North Waltham, Overton and Laverstoke, Sherborne St John, Tadley, and Whitchurch.

2010–2024: The Borough of Test Valley wards of Alamein, Amport, Anna, Bourne Valley, Charlton, Harrow Way, Millway, Penton Bellinger, St Mary's, and Winton, and the Borough of Basingstoke and Deane wards of Baughurst, Burghclere, East Woodhay, Highclere and Bourne, Kingsclere, Oakley and North Waltham, Overton, Laverstoke and Steventon, Tadley North, Tadley South, and Whitchurch.

2024–present: Further to the 2023 review of Westminster constituencies which came into effect for the 2024 general election, the constituency is composed of the following (as they existed on 1 December 2020):

- The Borough of Basingstoke and Deane wards of: Evingar; Sherborne St. John & Rooksdown; Tadley & Pamber; Tadley North, Kingsclere & Baughurst; Whitchurch, Overton & Laverstoke.
- The Borough of Test Valley wards of: Andover Downlands; Andover Harroway; Andover Millway; Andover Romans; Andover St. Mary's; Andover Winton; Bourne Valley.

To bring the electorate within the permitted range, rural areas to the west and south of Andover were transferred to Romsey and Southampton North and, in the east, the village of Oakley was transferred to Basingstoke. The Sherborne St John & Rooksdown ward was added.

== Members of Parliament ==
Basingstoke and Winchester prior to 1983

Election	Member	Party
1983	Sir David Mitchell	Conservative
1997	Sir George Young	Conservative
2015	Kit Malthouse	Conservative

== Elections ==
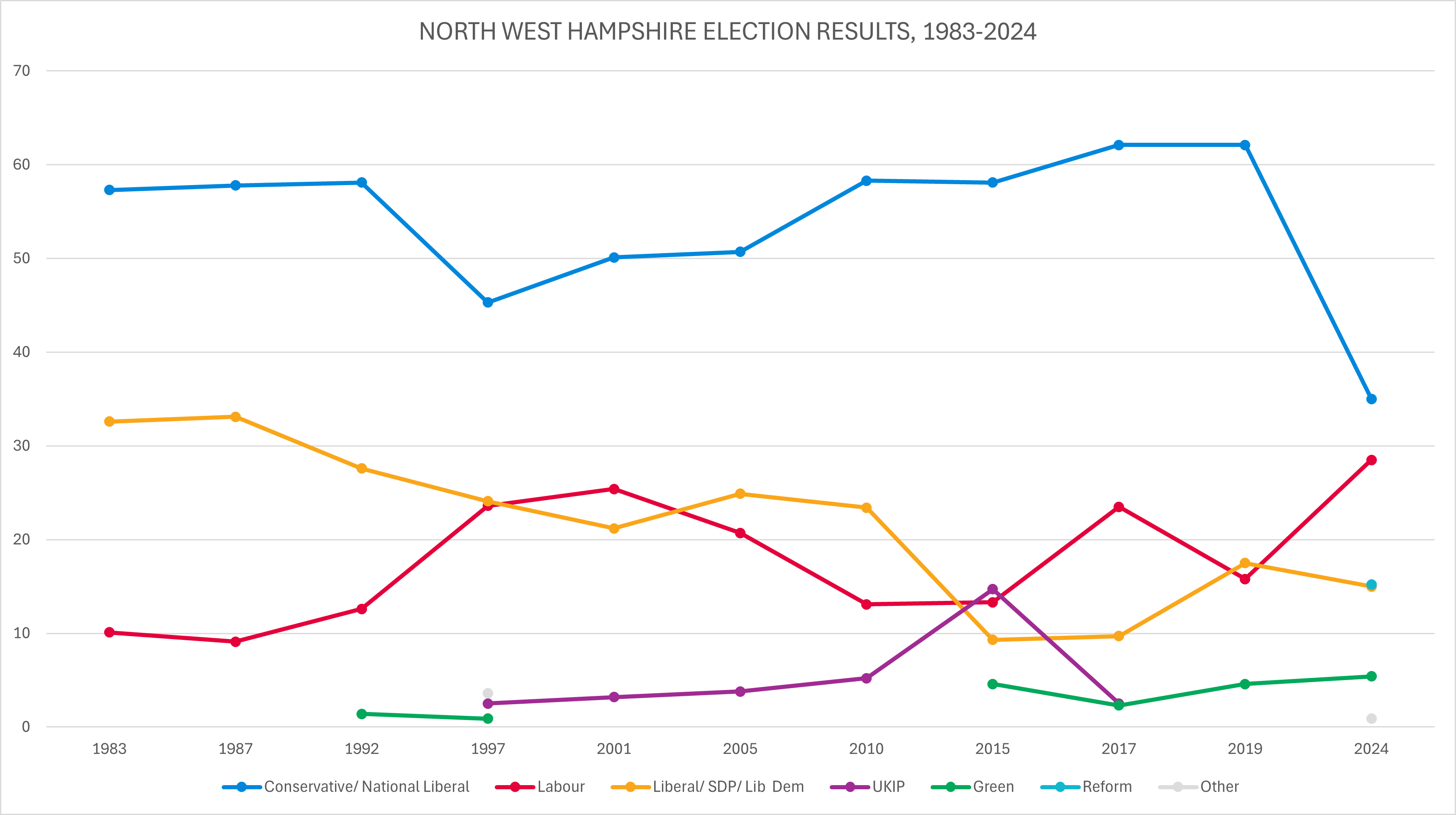
Election results 1983–2024

=== Elections in the 2020s ===
General election 2024: North West Hampshire
Party	Candidate	Votes	%	±%
Conservative	Kit Malthouse	17,770	35.0	−25.1
Labour	Andy Fitchet	14,482	28.5	+11.6
Reform	Andy Meacham	7,734	15.2	N/A
Liberal Democrats	Luigi Gregori	7,626	15.0	−3.5
Green	Hina West	2,745	5.4	+0.8
Hampshire Ind.	Phil Heath	466	0.9	N/A
Majority		3,288	6.5	−35.1
Turnout		50,823	65.0	−3.0
Registered electors		78,629		
Conservative hold		Swing	−18.4	

=== Elections in the 2010s ===
2019 notional result
Party	Vote	%
Conservative	31,051	60.1
Liberal Democrats	9,544	18.5
Labour	8,730	16.9
Green	2,362	4.6
Turnout	51,687	68.0
Electorate	76,004	

General election 2019: North West Hampshire
Party	Candidate	Votes	%	±%
Conservative	Kit Malthouse	36,591	62.1	±0.0
Liberal Democrats	Luigi Gregori	10,283	17.5	+7.8
Labour	Liz Bell	9,327	15.8	−7.7
Green	Lance Mitchell	2,717	4.6	+2.3
Majority		26,308	44.6	+6.0
Turnout		58,918	70.9	−1.3
Conservative hold		Swing	−3.85	

General election 2017: North West Hampshire
Party	Candidate	Votes	%	±%
Conservative	Kit Malthouse	36,471	62.1	+4.0
Labour	Andy Fitchet	13,792	23.5	+10.2
Liberal Democrats	Alex Payton	5,708	9.7	+0.4
UKIP	Roger Clark	1,467	2.5	−12.2
Green	Dan Hill	1,334	2.3	−2.3
Majority		22,679	38.6	−4.8
Turnout		58,772	72.2	+2.5
Conservative hold		Swing	+2.5	

General election 2015: North West Hampshire
Party	Candidate	Votes	%	±%
Conservative	Kit Malthouse	32,052	58.1	−0.2
UKIP	Susan Perkins	8,109	14.7	+9.5
Labour	Andrew Adams	7,342	13.3	+0.2
Liberal Democrats	Alexander Payton	5,151	9.3	−14.1
Green	Dan Hill	2,541	4.6	New
Majority		23,943	43.4	+3.5
Turnout		55,195	69.7	+0.1
Conservative hold		Swing	−4.9	

UKIP originally selected Diane James for this constituency. In March 2015 James was replaced firstly by Malcolm Bint, then shortly afterwards by Susan Perkins. Bint became candidate in North Durham.

General election 2010: North West Hampshire
Party	Candidate	Votes	%	±%
Conservative	George Young	31,072	58.3	+7.8
Liberal Democrats	Tom McCann	12,489	23.4	−1.5
Labour	Sarah Evans	6,980	13.1	−7.7
UKIP	Stan Oram	2,751	5.2	+1.4
Majority		18,583	34.9	+9.0
Turnout		53,292	69.6	+3.5
Conservative hold		Swing	+4.7	

=== Elections in the 2000s ===
General election 2005: North West Hampshire
Party	Candidate	Votes	%	±%
Conservative	George Young	26,005	50.7	+0.6
Liberal Democrats	Martin Tod	12,741	24.9	+3.7
Labour	Michael Mumford	10,594	20.7	−4.7
UKIP	Peter Sumner	1,925	3.8	+0.6
Majority		13,264	25.8	+1.1
Turnout		51,265	64.3	+2.0
Conservative hold		Swing	−1.5	

General election 2001: North West Hampshire
Party	Candidate	Votes	%	±%
Conservative	George Young	24,374	50.1	+4.8
Labour	Michael Mumford	12,365	25.4	+1.8
Liberal Democrats	Alex Bentley	10,329	21.2	−2.9
UKIP	Stanley Oram	1,563	3.2	+0.7
Majority		12,009	24.7	+3.5
Turnout		48,631	62.3	−11.9
Conservative hold		Swing		

=== Elections in the 1990s ===
General election 1997: North West Hampshire
Party	Candidate	Votes	%	±%
Conservative	George Young	24,730	45.3	−12.8
Liberal Democrats	Charlie Fleming	13,179	24.1	−3.9
Labour	Michael Mumford	12,900	23.6	+11.0
Referendum	Pamela Callaghan	1,533	2.8	New
UKIP	Tim Rolt	1,383	2.5	New
Green	William Baxter	486	0.9	N/A
Independent anti-Newbury bypass	Helen Anscomb	231	0.4	New
Independent	Bob Dodd	225	0.4	New
Majority		11,551	21.2	−9.0
Turnout		54,667	74.2	−6.6
Conservative hold		Swing		

General election 1992: North West Hampshire
Party	Candidate	Votes	%	±%
Conservative	David Mitchell	34,310	58.1	+0.3
Liberal Democrats	Michael Simpson	16,462	27.9	−5.2
Labour	Michael Stockwell	7,433	12.6	+3.5
Green	Doreen Ashley	825	1.4	New
Majority		17,848	30.2	+5.5
Turnout		59,030	80.8	+2.9
Conservative hold		Swing	+2.8	

=== Elections in the 1980s ===
General election 1987: North West Hampshire
Party	Candidate	Votes	%	±%
Conservative	David Mitchell	31,470	57.8	+0.5
Liberal	Ian Willis	18,033	33.1	+0.5
Labour	Anne Burnage	4,980	9.1	−1.0
Majority		13,437	24.7	0.0
Turnout		54,483	77.9	+3.5
Conservative hold		Swing		

General election 1983: North West Hampshire
Party	Candidate	Votes	%	±%
Conservative	David Mitchell	28,044	57.3	
Liberal	Ian Willis	15,922	32.6	
Labour	Michael Davis	4,957	10.1	
Majority		12,122	24.7	
Turnout		48,923	74.4	
Conservative win (new seat)				

== See also ==
- Parliamentary constituencies in Hampshire
- List of parliamentary constituencies in the South East England (region)
