= David Mitchell (politician) =

English Conservative politician (1928–2014)

Sir David Mitchell

Minister of State for Transport
- In office 9 January 1986 – 11 June 1987
- Prime Minister: Margaret Thatcher
- Preceded by: Lynda Chalker
- Succeeded by: Michael Portillo

Member of Parliament for North West Hampshire
- In office 9 June 1983 – 8 April 1997
- Preceded by: New constituency
- Succeeded by: Sir George Young, Bt

Member of Parliament for Basingstoke
- In office 15 October 1964 – 13 May 1983
- Preceded by: Denzil Freeth
- Succeeded by: Andrew Hunter

Personal details
- Born: 20 June 1928 Amersham, Buckinghamshire
- Died: 30 August 2014 (aged 86) Odiham, Hampshire
- Party: Conservative
- Relatives: Sir Andrew Mitchell (son)
- Occupation: politician and junior minister

Sir David Bower Mitchell (20 June 1928 – 30 August 2014) was a British Conservative politician who was a Member of Parliament for over 30 years, and who served as a junior minister in Margaret Thatcher's government.

== Early life ==
Mitchell was born in the Amersham Rural District in Buckinghamshire, and educated at Aldenham School, Hertfordshire, before becoming a wine shipper and merchant.

== Political career ==
Mitchell served as a councillor on St Pancras Borough Council from 1956 to 1959. He contested St Pancras North in 1959. He was the Member of Parliament for Basingstoke from 1964 to 1983, and for North West Hampshire from 1983 until he retired in 1997. In 1970, he was appointed parliamentary private secretary to Keith Joseph, Secretary of State for Social Services in the Heath ministry.

Mitchell served in the Thatcher ministry as Parliamentary Under-Secretary of State for Industry, 1979–1981, Parliamentary Under-Secretary of State at the Northern Ireland Office, 1981–1983, and then Parliamentary Under-Secretary of State, 9 June 1983 – 9 January 1986, and Minister of State, 9 January 1986 – 25 July 1988, at the Department of Transport. He was knighted in 1988 upon his resignation from government.

== Family ==
Mitchell's son Sir Andrew Mitchell is the Member of Parliament for Sutton Coldfield, and served as a minister in the governments of John Major, David Cameron and Rishi Sunak.

== Publications ==
In 2008, Mitchell published an autobiography entitled "From House to House, The Endless Adventures of Politics & Wine" with The Memoir Club, ISBN 978-1-84104-191-9.

Political offices
Preceded by Lynda Chalker	Minister of State for Transport; 9 January 1986 – 11 June 1987	Succeeded by Michael Portillo
Preceded by Reginald Eyre	Parliamentary Under-Secretary of State for Transport; 9 June 1983 – 9 January 1986	Succeeded by Peter Bottomley
Parliament of the United Kingdom
Preceded by Denzil Freeth	Member of Parliament for Basingstoke; 1964–1983	Succeeded by Andrew Hunter
New constituency	Member of Parliament for North West Hampshire; 1983–1997	Succeeded by Sir George Young, Bt
