= 1906 Basingstoke by-election =

UK parliamentary by-election

The 1906 Basingstoke by-election was a Parliamentary by-election held on 12 March 1906. The constituency returned one Member of Parliament (MP) to the House of Commons of the United Kingdom, elected by the first past the post voting system.

The by-election was held due to the death of the incumbent Conservative MP, Arthur Frederick Jeffreys and was won by the Conservative candidate Arthur Salter.

== Vacancy ==
Arthur Jeffreys had been Conservative MP for the seat since the 1887 Basingstoke by-election. He died on 14 February 1906 at the age of 57, just days after being re-elected at the 1906 general election.

== Electoral history ==
The seat had been Conservative since it was created in 1885. They held the seat at the last election by a very small majority;

General election January 1906
Party	Candidate	Votes	%	±%
Conservative	Arthur Frederick Jeffreys	4,825	50.6	N/A
Liberal	Harry Verney	4,705	49.4	N/A
Majority		120	1.2	N/A
Turnout		9,530	79.1	N/A
Conservative hold		Swing	N/A	

== Candidates ==
Verney

The Conservatives chose barrister Arthur Salter KC as their candidate. The local Liberal Association re-selected 24 year-old Harry Verney who had been their unsuccessful candidate at the general election. A third candidate, Ernest Polden, came forward. He described himself as an Independent Liberal.

== Campaign ==
Polling Day was fixed for the 12 March 1906.

== Result ==
The Conservatives held the seat with a slightly increased majority. The intervention of the Independent Liberal candidate proved to be crucial as he took enough votes away from the Liberal candidate to enable the Conservative to hang on.

1906 Basingstoke by-election
Party	Candidate	Votes	%	±%
Conservative	Arthur Salter	4,852	49.0	−1.6
Liberal	Harry Verney	4,593	46.3	−3.1
Independent Liberal	J. Ernest Polden	467	4.7	N/A
Majority		259	2.7	+1.5
Turnout		9,912	82.3	+3.2
Conservative hold		Swing	+0.7	

== Aftermath ==
Four years later, at the general election, Salter comfortably held the seat for the Conservatives against a new Liberal challenger.

General election January 1910: Basingstoke
Party	Candidate	Votes	%	±%
Conservative	Arthur Salter	7,506	66.3	+17.3
Liberal	John Ernest Wallis	3,821	33.7	−12.6
Majority		3,685	32.6	+29.9
Turnout		11,327	86.2	+3.9
Conservative hold		Swing	+14.9	

Verney switched to contest Buckingham where he was elected in December 1910.
