= 1920 Basingstoke by-election =

UK parliamentary by-election

- 31 March 1920 (Polling); 14 April 1920 (Declaration)
- Turnout: 60.0%

			Lab
Candidate	Arthur Holbrook	Harry Verney	James Round
Party	Unionist	Liberal	Labour
Alliance	Coalition
Popular vote	8,515	5,393	5,352
Percentage	44.2%	28.0%	27.8%
Swing	▼19.9%	New	New
MP before election
Auckland Geddes
Unionist
Subsequent MP
Arthur Holbrook
Unionist

The 1920 Basingstoke by-election was a parliamentary by-election for the British House of Commons constituency of Basingstoke on 31 March 1920.

== Background ==
The by-election was caused by the resignation of the sitting Unionist MP, Auckland Geddes when he was appointed British Ambassador to the United States. He had been MP here since winning the seat in 1917.

=== Electoral history ===
The result at the last general election in 1918 was;

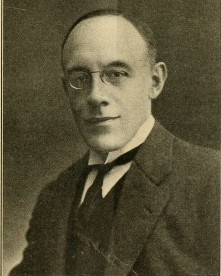
Geddes

General election 1918: Basingstoke
Party		Candidate	Votes	%
C	Unionist	Auckland Geddes	11,218	64.1
	Independent Labour	A. Close	6,277	35.9
Majority			4,941	28.2
Turnout			17,495	55.2
Registered electors				
	Unionist win (new boundaries)			
C indicates candidate endorsed by the coalition government.

== Candidates ==
- The Unionists selected 70-year-old Arthur Holbrook as their candidate to defend the seat. He was a Newspaper proprietor; founder of Southern Daily Mail; Fellow of the Institute of Journalists; President Newspaper Society, 1913–14; Chairman Portsmouth Conservative Association, 1885–98; President Portsmouth Chamber of Commerce, 1907–12; Commanded Royal Army Service Corps, Salisbury Plain District, 1914–19.

Verney

- Back in 1919, the Liberals had selected 39-year-old Sir Harry Verney as their prospective parliamentary candidate to challenge for the seat at a future election, so he had nearly a year to establish himself. He had stood before as Liberal candidate for Basingstoke, back in 1906. Verney succeeded to a baronetcy in May 1910. In the December general election of the same year he was returned to Parliament for Buckingham, a seat he held until 1918. He served under H. H. Asquith as Parliamentary Secretary to the Board of Agriculture and Fisheries from 1914 to 1915.
- The Labour Party selected a new, first timer James Round as their candidate to challenge for the seat.
- E.T. Judd of the National Farmers' Union put himself forward as a possible candidate. Initially he had sought the Conservative Party nomination before becoming the nominee of the Agricultural party. However, he announced his decision not to contest the seat just before nominations closed.

== Campaign ==
Polling Day was set for 31 March 1920. On 26 March nominations closed to confirm that the election would be a three-way contest.

Holbrook received the official endorsement of the Coalition Government in separate letters from Lloyd George and Bonar Law.

Farming was the dominant issue as the seat was mainly agricultural. By the rejection of Judd, the Unionists lost the support of a large section of farmers who threatened either to abstain from voting or to vote Liberal. For the Labour campaign, Round's chief hope lay in the organized farm labourers.

== Result ==
The Unionists held onto the seat with a much reduced majority, while the Liberals won the battle for second place.

1920 Basingstoke by-election
Party		Candidate	Votes	%	±%
C	Unionist	Arthur Holbrook	8,515	44.2	–19.9
	Liberal	Harry Verney	5,393	28.0	N/A
	Labour	James Round	5,352	27.8	N/A
Majority			3,122	16.2	–12.0
Turnout			19,260	60.0	+4.8
Registered electors					
	Unionist hold		Swing	–5.9	
C indicates candidate endorsed by the coalition government.

== Aftermath ==
Holbrook defended his seat at the following general election, while Verney moved to contest Skipton. Round did not stand again.

== See also ==
- List of United Kingdom by-elections
- United Kingdom by-election records
