= Arthur Frederick Jeffreys =

British politician

The Right Honourable Arthur Frederick Jeffreys PC DL JP
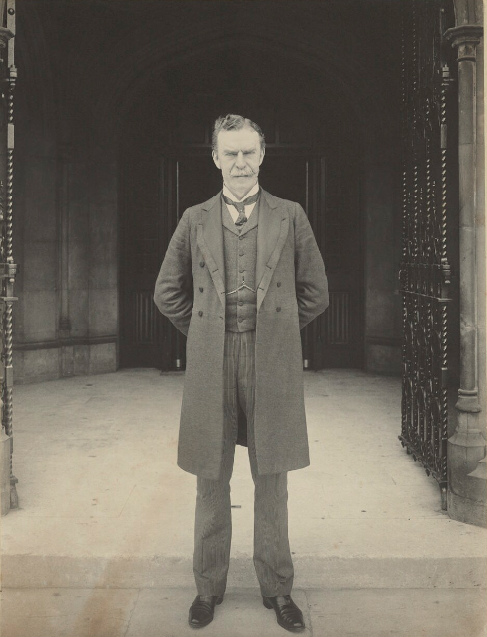
- Jeffreys pictured in 1905

Member of Parliament for Basingstoke
- In office 19 July 1887 – 14 February 1906
- Monarchs: Victoria; Edward VII
- Preceded by: George Sclater-Booth
- Succeeded by: Arthur Salter

Personal details
- Born: 7 April 1848 Sydney, New South Wales, Australia
- Died: 14 February 1906 (aged 57) Lasham, Hampshire, England
- Resting place: St Mary's Church, Bentworth; 51.15792°N 1.04982°W
- Party: Conservative
- Spouse(s): Amy Constantia Fenwick (1877–1906: his death)
- Children: 4
- Parent(s): Arthur Jeffreys; Sarah Campbell
- Education: Christ Church, Oxford
- Cricket career

Personal information
- Height: 6 ft 2 in (1.88 m)
- Batting: Right-handed
- Role: Occasional wicket-keeper

Domestic team information
- Years: Team
- 1872–1879: Marylebone Cricket Club
- 1872/73: New South Wales
- 1876–1878: Hampshire

Career statistics
Competition	First-class
Matches	26
Runs scored	587
Batting average	14.31
100s/50s	–/3
Top score	60
Catches/stumpings	9/1
- Source: Arthur Frederick Jeffreys at Cricinfo

Arthur Frederick Jeffreys (7 April 1848 – 14 February 1906) was an English first-class cricketer and Conservative politician. He served as the member of parliament for Basingstoke from 1887 until his death in 1906. As a cricketer, he made 26 appearances in first-class cricket, mostly for the Marylebone Cricket Club, though he also played for Hampshire and in Australia for New South Wales.

== Early life and cricket ==
Jeffreys was the son of Arthur Jeffreys, a member of the New South Wales Legislative Council, who had emigrated to the Colony of New South Wales in 1839. He was born in Sydney in April 1848, and later matriculated to study in England at Christ Church, Oxford; there he studied mathematics, graduating in 1870. He excelled for Christ Church in cricket and athletics, but did not represent Oxford University in first-class cricket. A student of the Inner Temple, he was called to the bar in January 1872, allowing him to practice on the Western Circuit; however, he would not practice as a barrister. In the same year that he was called to the bar, he made his debut in first-class cricket for the Marylebone Cricket Club (MCC) against Oxford University at Oxford in 1872, with Jeffreys making three further appearances for the MCC in 1872.

In the winter which followed, Jeffreys returned to New South Wales. There he made a first-class appearance for the New South Wales cricket team against Victoria at Sydney in February 1873. Returning to England, he resumed playing first-class cricket for the MCC from 1875, and in 1876 he began playing first-class cricket for Hampshire. He played first-class cricket until 1879, having made fifteen appearances for the MCC and ten for Hampshire. For the MCC, he scored 377 runs at an average of 17.13, making two half centuries with a highest score of 60. For Hampshire, he scored 203 runs at an average of 11.94, making one half century score of 51. Scores and Biographies (1879) noted that Jeffreys fielded mostly at cover-point.

== Political career and death ==
Jeffreys purchased the Burkham House estate near Alton, Hampshire, in 1881 or 1882. Already a justice of the peace for Hampshire, He was elected a member of parliament (MP) to the House of Commons for Basingstoke in July 1887, having successfully contested the Basingstoke by-election for the Conservative Party, defeating the Liberal Party candidate Richard Eve by 732 votes (13.2%). In the 1892 general election, he extended his majority to 1,491 votes (22.6%), while in the 1895 and 1900 general elections he ran unopposed. Jeffreys was a warm supporter of agriculture and the Church of England, being known during his parliamentary service for his non-partisan conduct. He was sworn a member of the Imperial Privy Council on 11 August 1902, following an announcement of the King's intention to make this appointment in the 1902 Coronation Honours. He served briefly under Arthur Balfour as Parliamentary Secretary to the Local Government Board from June to December 1905, obtaining the position upon James Lowther's election to Speaker of the House of Commons. He contested the 1906 general election, defeating the Liberal Harry Verney by a vastly reduced majority of 120 votes (1.2%).

Alongside his parliamentary career, Jeffreys served as a deputy lieutenant for Hampshire in 1890, and was also a councillor on Hampshire County Council. After presiding over a sitting of the Basingstoke licensing committee in February 1906, Jeffreys suffered a stroke. He died a week later on 14 February at his Burkham House residence. He was subsequently succeeded as MP for Basingstoke by Arthur Salter in the by-election which followed his death. His funeral took place at St Mary's Church in Bentworth on 17 February. Jeffreys was survived by his wife, Amy Constantia Fenwick, whom he had married in 1877; the couple had three daughters and a son. Their son George became a prominent military commander and was elevated to the peerage as Baron Jeffreys in 1952.

Parliament of the United Kingdom
Preceded by George Sclater-Booth	Member of Parliament for Basingstoke; 1887–1906	Succeeded by Arthur Clavell Salter
Political offices
Preceded by Sir John Grant Lawson	Parliamentary Secretary to the Local Government Board; 1905	Succeeded by Walter Runciman
