= Maria Miller =

British politician (born 1964)

The Right Honourable Dame Maria Miller DBE
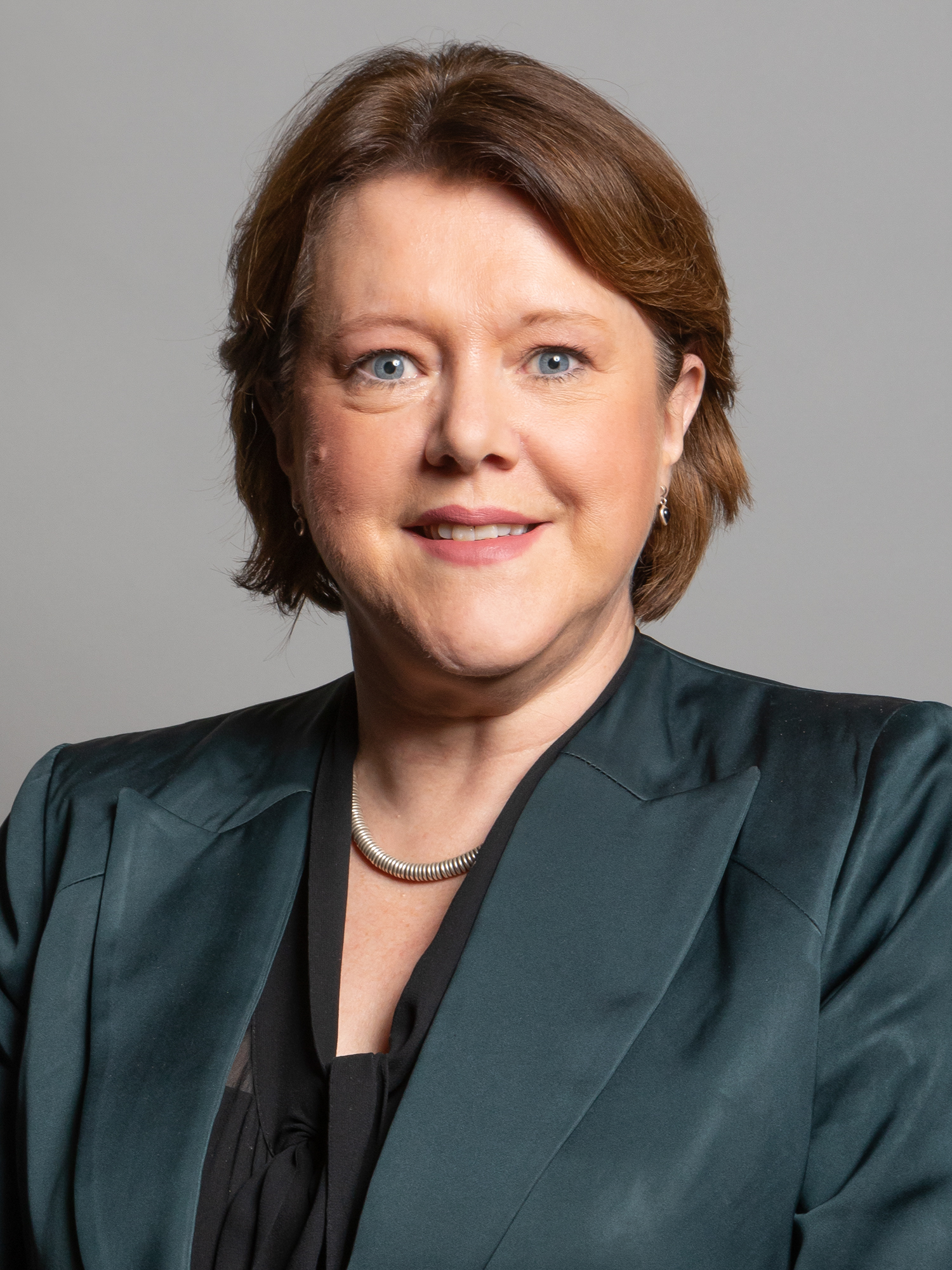
- Official portrait, 2020

Chair of the Women and Equalities Select Committee
- In office 18 June 2015 – 29 January 2020
- Preceded by: Office established
- Succeeded by: Caroline Nokes

Secretary of State for Culture, Media and Sport
- In office 4 September 2012 – 9 April 2014
- Prime Minister: David Cameron
- Preceded by: Jeremy Hunt
- Succeeded by: Sajid Javid

Minister for Women and Equalities
- In office 4 September 2012 – 9 April 2014
- Prime Minister: David Cameron
- Preceded by: Theresa May
- Succeeded by: Nicky Morgan

Parliamentary Under-Secretary of State for Disabled People
- In office 12 May 2010 – 4 September 2012
- Prime Minister: David Cameron
- Preceded by: Jonathan Shaw
- Succeeded by: Esther McVey

Member of Parliament for Basingstoke
- In office 5 May 2005 – 30 May 2024
- Preceded by: Andrew Hunter
- Succeeded by: Luke Murphy

Personal details
- Born: Maria Frances Lewis; 26 March 1964 (age 62) Wolverhampton, England
- Party: Conservative
- Spouse: Iain Miller (m. 1990)
- Children: 3
- Education: London School of Economics
- Website: mariamiller.co.uk

Dame Maria Frances Miller DBE (née Lewis; born 26 March 1964) is a British politician who was the Member of Parliament (MP) for Basingstoke from 2005 until the 2024 general election. A member of the Conservative Party, she served as Secretary of State for Culture, Media and Sport from 2012 to 2014 under Prime Minister David Cameron.

In opposition Miller served as the Shadow Minister for Education from 2005 to 2006, Shadow Minister for Family Welfare from 2006 to 2007 and Shadow Minister for Families from 2007 to 2010.

She served as Parliamentary Under-Secretary of State (Minister for Disabled People) from 2010 to 2012 and later served in the Cabinet as Secretary of State for Culture, Media and Sport and Minister for Women and Equalities from 2012 to 2014. She resigned from the Cabinet in April 2014 after reports that she had over-claimed expenses.

In June 2015 Miller was elected as chair of the newly established Women and Equalities Select Committee. She was nominated for the position by MPs across the House in 2017 and was reelected unopposed. In 2019, Miller announced she would step down from the role.

In January 2025, Miller was appointed the first independent chair of the Chartered Institute of Public Relations (CIPR).

== Early life ==
The daughter of John Lewis, she was born in Wolverhampton, but was brought up in Bridgend, South Wales. She was educated at the Brynteg School before reading Economics at the London School of Economics, from where she graduated in 1985. She joined Grey Advertising Ltd as an advertising executive, leaving in 1990 to become a marketing manager with Texaco. She rejoined Greys in 1994 and served for five years as a director, before becoming a director for the Rowland Group in 1999 for four years.

== Parliamentary career ==
Miller joined the Conservative Party in 1983 and contested Wolverhampton North East at the 2001 general election but was defeated by the sitting Labour MP, Ken Purchase. She retained formal links with the local Conservative Association for some time thereafter; she also chaired the Wimbledon Association for a year from 2002.

Miller was first elected to the House of Commons at the 2005 general election, for the Basingstoke constituency, following the retirement of its former MP, the Conservative Andrew Hunter, who had defected to the Northern Ireland Democratic Unionist Party before he stepped down. In Parliament she served for a year from 2005 as a member of the Trade and Industry Select Committee.

Later in 2005, David Cameron appointed her a spokesperson for the Shadow Education and Skills team. She was appointed Shadow Minister for Families in 2007. Following the 2010 general election she was appointed Parliamentary Under-Secretary of State and Minister for Disabled People at the Department for Work and Pensions.

In May 2012, she urged the Prime Minister to continue with proposals to introduce same-sex marriage in England and Wales.

On 4 September 2012, Miller was appointed Secretary of State for Culture, Media and Sport and Minister for Women and Equality in David Cameron's first major Cabinet reshuffle.

She chaired the Women and Equalities Select Committee from when it was established in June 2015 until January 2020. Miller stepped down from the role in 2019 and Caroline Nokes (Conservative MP for Romsey and Southampton North) was nominated and elected as the new chair.

Miller was opposed to Brexit prior to the 2016 referendum.

In March 2020 she became a member of both the Administration Committee and the Panel of Chairs, and in November 2020 joined the Joint Committee on the Fixed-Term Parliaments Act.

Miller was appointed Dame Commander of the Order of the British Empire (DBE) in the 2022 Birthday Honours for parliamentary and public service. From May 2022 to July 2024 she served in the voluntary role of Prime Ministerial Trade Envoy to Canada. In addition, she served as Chairman of the Commonwealth Parliamentary Association (UK Branch).

=== Same-sex marriage ===
Maria Miller in her role as the Minister for Women and Equalities, Secretary of State, announced on 11 December 2012 that the government would bring forward same-sex marriage legislation for England and Wales in early 2013.

The government's equal civil marriage consultation was launched on 15 March 2012. It ran for 13 weeks and closed on 14 June 2012. It received more than 228,000 individual responses, the largest ever response to a government consultation, the majority of which were in favour of the Government's proposal to allow same-sex couples to get married. Additionally there were petitions for and against equal marriage, the largest of which was from the Coalition for Marriage, against the proposals.

In response to the consultation results, the proposals were extended to allow religious organisations to opt into performing same-sex marriages if they wish, and a "quadruple-lock" of additional measures to put the protection of religious freedoms "utterly beyond doubt".

Marriage (Same Sex Couples) Bill was introduced to the Commons by Maria Miller on 24 January 2013 followed by second reading on 5 February.

On 5 February 2013, the bill passed its second reading in the House of Commons by 400 votes to 175.

The bill was examined in 13 sittings by the Marriage (Same Sex Couples) Bill Committee, a public bill committee established to scrutinise the bill line by line. The bill completed its committee stage on 12 March 2013 and had its report stage in the House of Commons on 20–21 May 2013. The third reading took place on 21 May, and was approved by 366 votes to 161, with the bill receiving its first reading in the House of Lords the same evening.

The bill had its second reading unopposed in the Lords on 4 June, after a "wrecking amendment" proposed by Lord Dear was defeated by a vote of 390–148, thus allowing the bill to proceed to the committee stage. The bill passed its third reading in the House of Lords on 15 July 2013, and the Commons accepted all of the Lords' amendments on the following day, with royal assent by Queen Elizabeth II granted on 17 July 2013.

On 10 December 2013, Miller announced that same-sex marriage ceremonies would begin on 29 March 2014 in England and Wales.

=== Revenge pornography ===
Miller ran a six-month campaign in 2014 for a change in the law when she was contacted by one of her Basingstoke constituents who had been affected by "revenge porn" being posted online.

Miller campaigned to change the law and make posting online revenge pornography a crime. The existing law predated the digital age and did not adequately protect individuals from this type of online abuse.

The Criminal Justice and Courts Act received Royal Assent on 16 February 2015, making revenge pornography illegal, punishable by up to two years in prison.

=== Expenses claims ===
In December 2012, The Daily Telegraph reported that, between 2005 and 2009, Miller had claimed more than £90,000 in parliamentary expenses for the mortgage and upkeep of a house in south London where she lived with her parents. She was subsequently reported to Parliamentary Commissioner for Standards John Lyon by MP John Mann, and an inquiry was launched into the claims.

Miller explained that her parents lived with her as "dependents" under Independent Parliamentary Standards Authority rules.

Shortly after the Telegraph broke the story on Miller's expenses, it emerged that both Cameron's spokesman, Craig Oliver, and Miller's special advisor, Joanna Hindley, had phoned the newspaper prior to publication in an attempt to warn it off. According to the paper, the pair issued a veiled threat by reminding it of Miller's role in enacting proposals in the Leveson report on press regulation. Downing Street denied that any threats were made. The newspaper later released the recording they had made of Hindley's call.

Investigation lasted more than a year, and was handed in to the Commons Select Committee on Standards in February 2014. In it, the standards commissioner had concluded Miller had been in the wrong, and recommended she pay back £45,000. On 3 April 2014, however, the Standards Committee concluded "recommended that Mrs Miller repay the £5,800 which she has identified as an overclaim. She should also apologise by personal statement on the floor of the House for her attitude to the Commissioner's inquiries" Following poor advice from the then Chief Whip, George Young, she made a 32-second Commons statement the same day.

The case was referred to the police by MP Thomas Docherty.

On 9 April 2014, Miller resigned from the cabinet. David Cameron, expressed "sadness" over her stepping down, and said he hoped she would be able to return to the front bench "in due course".

== Post-parliamentary career ==
After leaving the House of Commons, Miller began working as a specialist advisor on diversity, equity, and inclusion. In January 2025 she took office as the first independent chair of the Chartered Institute of Public Relations. With the announcement of her appointment, Miller stated that her work will focus on issues such as talent development, digital regulation and the responsible use of AI in the public relations industry. In January 2026, she was appointed as the Bar Council's Commissioner for Conduct.

== Sexual harassment ==
Miller disclosed her experience in being sexually harassed many times. An article published in The Guardian in 2017 mentioned Miller as saying that harassment happens frequently in industries and companies dominated by men.

She supports a campaign to expose incidents of sexual harassment on women which gained the support of other MPs like Labour Party MP Jess Phillips and Conservative MP George Freeman. Miller also encouraged teachers to become more stringent on harassment that takes place in schools instead of treating such behaviour as something marginal. According to the former Culture Secretary, head teachers must review existing school policies and treat sexual exploitation as a crime.

== Personal life ==
Maria Miller is married with three children. In 2013, she was assessed as the seventeenth most powerful woman in the UK by BBC Radio 4's Woman's Hour.

Parliament of the United Kingdom
Preceded by Andrew Hunter	Member of Parliament for Basingstoke; 2005–2024	Succeeded by Luke Murphy
Political offices
Preceded by Jonathan Shaw	Undersecretary of State for Disabled People; 2010–2012	Succeeded by Esther McVey
Preceded by Theresa May	Minister for Women and Equalities; 2012–2014	Succeeded by Nicky Morgan as Minister for Women
Preceded by Theresa May	Minister for Women and Equalities; 2012–2014	Succeeded by Sajid Javid as Secretary of State for Culture, Media, Sport and Equalities
Preceded by Jeremy Hunt	Secretary of State for Culture, Media and Sport; 2012–2014	Succeeded by Sajid Javid as Secretary of State for Culture, Media, Sport and Equalities
