= Electoral district of Pastoral District of Maneroo =

Former New South Wales Legislative Council electoral district

Pastoral District of Maneroo New South Wales—Legislative Council
- State: New South Wales
- Created: 1851
- Abolished: 1856
- Namesake: Maneroo region

The Electoral district of Pastoral District of Maneroo was an electorate of the New South Wales Legislative Council at a time when some of its members were elected and the balance were appointed by the Governor. It was a new electorate created in 1851 by the expansion of the Legislative Council to 54, 18 to be appointed and 36 elected. The district covered the Maneroo region now known as Monaro in the south east of New South Wales. To its north was the Electoral district of Counties of Murray and St Vincent. Polling was to occur in the towns of Goulburn, Eden, Cooma and Bombala.

In 1856 the unicameral Legislative Council was abolished and replaced with an elected Legislative Assembly and an appointed Legislative Council. The district was represented by the Legislative Assembly electorate of Maneroo.

== Members ==
Member	Term
Arthur Jeffreys	Sep 1851 – Feb 1854
Daniel Egan	Apr 1854 – Feb 1856

== Election results ==
=== 1851 ===
1851 New South Wales colonial election, 25 September: Pastoral District of Maneroo
Candidate	Votes	%
Arthur Jeffreys	unopposed	

=== 1854 ===
Arthur Jeffreys resigned in February 1854.

Pastoral District of Maneroo by-election 19 April 1854
Candidate	Votes	%
Daniel Egan	show of hands	
Charles Kemp		
