= Arthur Salter (judge) =

Sir Arthur Salter
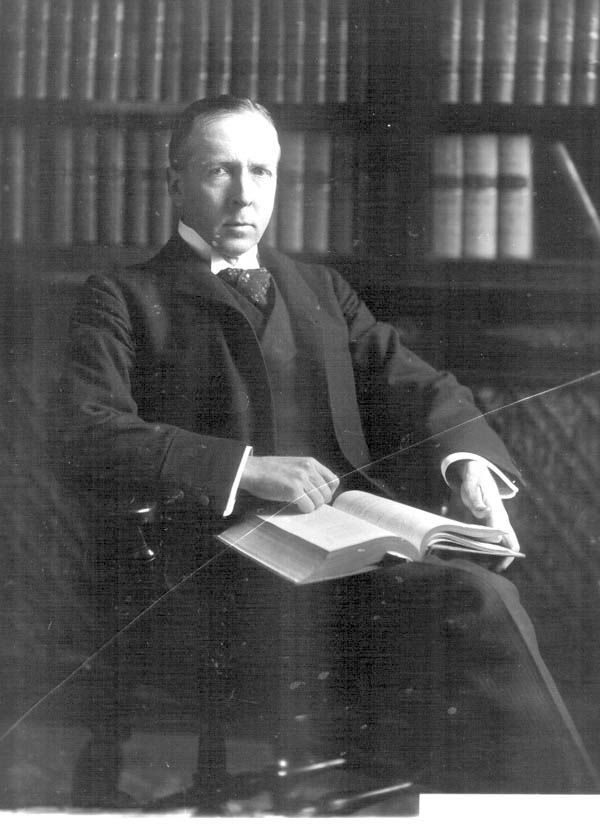
- Salter in 1909

Justice of the High Court
- In office 1917 – 30 November 1928

Member of Parliament for Basingstoke
- Incumbent
- Assumed office 1906
- Preceded by: Arthur Frederick Jeffreys
- Succeeded by: Auckland Geddes

Personal details
- Born: Arthur Clavell Salter; 30 October 1859
- Died: 30 November 1928 (aged 69)

Sir Arthur Clavell Salter (30 October 1859 – 30 November 1928) was a British Conservative Party politician and judge who sat on the King's Bench Division of the High Court of Justice.

== Early life and education ==
Born to Dr Henry Hyde Salter, FRS (1823–71) and his wife Henrietta, Salter was educated at Wimborne Grammar School and King's College London, where he studied arts and law. He married Mary Dorothea (d. 1917) in 1894, daughter of Major J. H. Lloyd. Him and Mary had a daughter and a son, 2nd Lieutenant John Henry Clavell Salter, who was killed in action in World War 1 in 1918. After Mary's death, he married Nora Constance, of Lieutenant-Colonel Thomas Heathcote Ouchterloney.

== Career ==
He was called to the Bar in 1885 by the Middle Temple, and joined the western circuit in the following year. He became a King's Counsel in 1904 and was elected as a Member of Parliament for Basingstoke in 1906, where he sat until his appointment as a High Court Judge in 1917, and sat on the Kings Bench Division. He also served as the Recorder of Poole from 1904 to 1917. During his tenure, he sat on a number of high-profile cases such as that of Horatio Bottomley in 1922, an MP. He served on the High Court until his death on 30 November 1928.

Parliament of the United Kingdom
Preceded by Arthur Frederick Jeffreys	Member of Parliament for Basingstoke; 1906 – 1917	Succeeded by Auckland Geddes
