= Arthur Jeffreys =

English-Australian politician

Arthur Jeffreys (1 October 1811 – 13 September 1861) was an English-Australian politician.

He was born in Barnes in Surrey to the Reverend John Jeffreys. He migrated to New South Wales in 1839, and later purchased land near Queanbeyan at Acton. He also owned land in Sydney, notably at Canterbury and Kirribilli.

In 1851 he was elected unopposed as the member for the Pastoral District of Maneroo in the New South Wales Legislative Council, and resigned in February 1854.

He married Sarah Campbell, daughter of Robert Campbell, on 17 February 1841; they had four children, one of whom, Arthur Frederick Jeffreys, was later a member of the British House of Commons.

He died of Bright's disease in 1861 at Hastings in Sussex.

New South Wales Legislative Council
New district	Member for Pastoral District of Maneroo; 1851–1854	Succeeded by Daniel Egan
