= Starrett & van Vleck =

American architectural firm

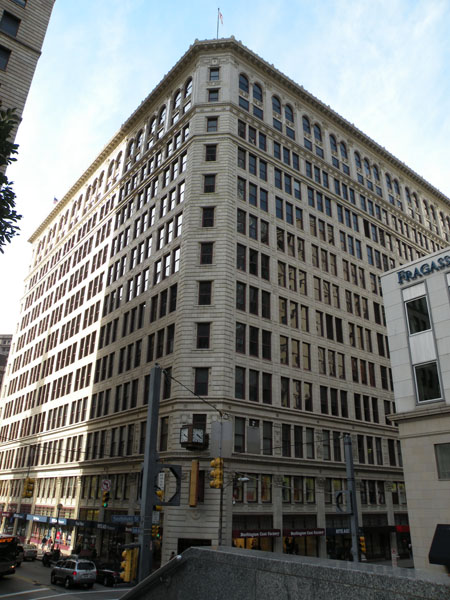
- Heinz 57 Center (formerly the Gimbel Brothers Department Store), built in 1914, located at 339 Sixth Avenue in Downtown Pittsburgh, Pennsylvania.
- Formerly: Godwin Starrett & van Vleck
- Founded: 1908; 118 years ago
- Headquarters: New York City, United States
- Key people: Goldwin Starrett and Ernest A. van Vleck, founders
- Services: Architecture

Starrett & van Vleck (often spelled Starrett & Van Vleck) was an American architectural firm based in New York City which specialized in the design of department stores, primarily in the early 20th century. It was active from 1908 until at least the late 1950s.

== History ==
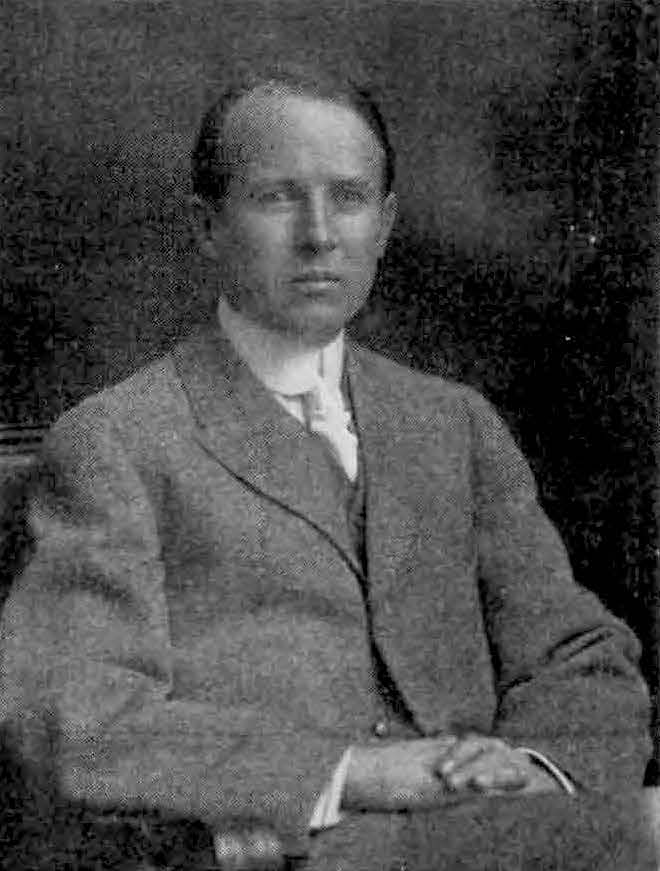
Goldwin Starrett, in or before 1918.

The senior partner, Goldwin Starrett, was born September 29, 1874, in Lawrence, Kansas, to William Aiken Starrett and Helen Martha (Ekin) Starrett, a noted educator and activist. Starrett was educated in his mother's school before enrolling in the University of Michigan, graduating with a degree in mechanical engineering in 1894. For the following four years he worked for D. H. Burnham & Company, architects of Chicago. Two of his elder brothers, Theodore Starrett and Paul Starrett, had also worked for Burnham. In 1898 he left Chicago for New York, where he joined the office of George A. Fuller & Company as a superintendent and assistant manager. In 1900 he joined Thompson–Starrett, the family contracting firm. Due to his architectural experience, during this period he designed several of the buildings built by the firm, including the Algonquin Hotel. In 1904 he was an incorporator of the E. B. Ellis Granite Company of Northfield, Vermont, and served as vice president of the company. Ellis was the granite contractor for the Washington Union Station, designed by D. H. Burnham & Company and built by Thompson–Starrett. In 1908 he withdrew from the company and established himself as an architect in New York. Shortly afterward, he formed a partnership with Ernest A. van Vleck.

Ernest Alan van Vleck was born July 1, 1875, in Bell Creek Township, Burt County, Nebraska, to Cady Lycurgus van Vleck, a farmer, and Mary Ann (Lundy) van Vleck. After an education in the public schools of Fresno, California, and Red Creek, New York, he entered the architecture school of Cornell University, graduating in 1897. At his graduation he was awarded an architectural traveling fellowship, and so toured Europe for a year. On his return he joined Thompson–Starrett as an architect. He remained with the company until 1908, when he joined his former associate Goldwin Starrett in partnership. The new firm was named Goldwin Starrett & van Vleck. They were joined in partnership by Oran Winthrop Rice in 1910, followed by Starrett's younger brother William A. Starrett in 1913. At that time, the firm's name was changed simply to Starrett & van Vleck. Starrett died May 9, 1918, at home in Glen Ridge, New Jersey, and van Vleck became the firm's senior partner. In 1919, van Vleck and Rice admitted Ernest Brooks, another Cornell graduate, into the partnership. It was further expanded in 1924 to include Frank Gaertner, Herbert M. Hathaway, Otto A. Johnson and Frank L. Kirby. The firm's name was not changed. In 1946 they were joined by Reginald E. Marsh following the dissolution of his firm, Tooker & Marsh. Van Vleck died August 8, 1956, in St. Petersburg, Florida. After van Vleck died, Marsh left to reestablish his own practice. The firm continued for a few years under Gaertner's leadership, but it is not known when it was finally dissolved. Their last identified completed project is Saint Barnabas High School in The Bronx, completed in 1959.

== Notable projects ==
The firm's major designs include the Lord & Taylor, Bloomingdale's, and Saks Fifth Avenue flagship buildings, along with those for Abraham & Straus and Alexander's. The Lord & Taylor flagship, located on Fifth Avenue between 38th and 39th Streets, was completed in 1914 as Starrett & van Vleck's first major department store and is a New York City designated landmark.

They were also responsible for the design of the designated New York City landmarks the Everett Building (1908), American Stock Exchange Building (1921), 21 West Street (1929), and Downtown Athletic Club (1930). Between 1937 and 1948, they designed the downtown flagship store of J. N. Adam & Co. in Buffalo, New York, which is located in the J.N. Adam-AM&A Historic District but is currently threatened with demolition. Their credits also include the flagship store of Washington, D.C.'s Garfinckel's, and the Miller & Rhoads department store and the former Mosby Dry Goods Store in Richmond, VA, which is now undergoing restoration and renovation as a hotel. Garfinckel's was added to the National Register of Historic Places in 1995.

In Pittsburgh, Starrett & van Vleck was responsible for the design of the downtown flagship of the Gimbels Department Store which was built in 1914 for Kaufmann & Baer. Gimbels closed in Pittsburgh in 1987. The building was renamed the Heinz 57 Center in 2002 after the remodeled building became the North American headquarters for the H.J. Heinz Co. It was added to the Pittsburgh History and Landmarks Foundation as a Historic Landmark in 1982. Near Pittsburgh, in 1912, they designed the house that later became the clubhouse of the Foxburg Country Club.

A number of its works are listed on the National Register of Historic Places.

== Employees ==
Starrett & van Vleck employed several architects who would become notable in their own right. These include:

- William Francis Deegan
- William Henry Harrison
- Gerald K. Geerlings
- Ferdinand Gottlieb
- Yasuo Matsui

== Works ==
- Hahne and Company Department Store, Newark, New Jersey (1901, NRHP 1994)
- Algonquin Hotel, New York, New York (1902)
- Everett Building, New York, New York (1908, NYCL 1988)
- 300 Park Avenue South, New York, New York (1911)
- Albany High School (former), Albany, New York (1912–13)
- House for Robert W. Grange Jr., Foxburg, Pennsylvania (1912, NRHP 2007)
- Second National Bank Building, New Haven, Connecticut (1912–13)
- Lord & Taylor Building New York, New York (1913–14, NYCL 2007)
- 475 Tenth Avenue, New York, New York (1914)
- Kaufmann & Baer Department Store, (Note: Bought by Gimbels in 1925, and now known as the Heinz 57 Center.) Pittsburgh, Pennsylvania (1914)
- Montclair High School, Montclair, New Jersey (1915)
- Third National Bank Building, (Note: In association with B. Hammett Seabury of Springfield. Now known as Harrison Place.) Springfield, Massachusetts (1915)
- 820 Fifth Avenue, New York, New York (1916)
- J. B. Mosby & Company Store, Richmond, Virginia (1916)
- Studio for Jules Guérin at 304 Park Avenue South, New York, New York (1916, NRHP 2005)
- 32 Court Street, Brooklyn, New York (1917–18)
- Lasalle, Koch and Company Department Store, Toledo, Ohio (1917, NRHP 1995)
- American Stock Exchange Building, New York, New York (1920–21 and 1930–31, NRHP 1978, NYCL 2012)
- Miller & Rhoads Department Store, Richmond, Virginia (1920)
- Lincoln School of Teachers College (former), (Note: Now home to the Columbia Secondary School.) New York, New York (1921)
- Charles B. Aycock School, Greensboro, North Carolina (1922)
- Pizitz Building, (Note: In association with Harry B. Wheelock of Birmingham.) Birmingham, Alabama (1922)
- Richmond Trust Company Building, Richmond, Virginia (1922)
- Saks Fifth Avenue Building, New York, New York (1922–24, NYCL 1984)
- Charles D. McIver School (former), Greensboro, North Carolina (1923, NRHP 1992)
- Columbus High School, Columbus, Georgia (1925–26)
- Davison's Department Store, Atlanta, Georgia (1925–27)
- Garfinckel's Department Store, Washington, D.C. (1925–29, NRHP 1995)
- Kresge-Newark Department Store, Newark, New Jersey (1925–26)
- Strouss-Hirshberg Department Store, Youngstown, Ohio (1926, NRHP 1986)
- 150 William Street, New York, New York (1927)
- 333 East 38th Street, New York, New York (1928)
- Leverich Towers Hotel, Brooklyn, New York (1928)
- 21 West Street, New York, New York (1929–31, NYCL 1998, NRHP 1999)
- Abraham & Straus Department Store, Brooklyn, New York (1929)
- Downtown Athletic Club, New York, New York (1929–30, NYCL 2000)
- Bloomingdale's Department Store, New York, New York (1930)
- J. N. Adam & Company Department Store, Buffalo, New York (1935 and 1946–48)
- School of St. Aloysius Catholic Church, New York, New York (1940)
- Anabel Taylor Hall, Cornell University, Ithaca, New York (1953)
- Von Cramm Cooperative Hall, Cornell University, Ithaca, New York (1955–56)
- Robert F. Wagner Houses, New York, New York (1956–58)
- Convent of St. Catherine of Siena Church, New York, New York (1957, demolished)
- Saint Barnabas High School, Bronx, New York (1957–59)

== Gallery ==
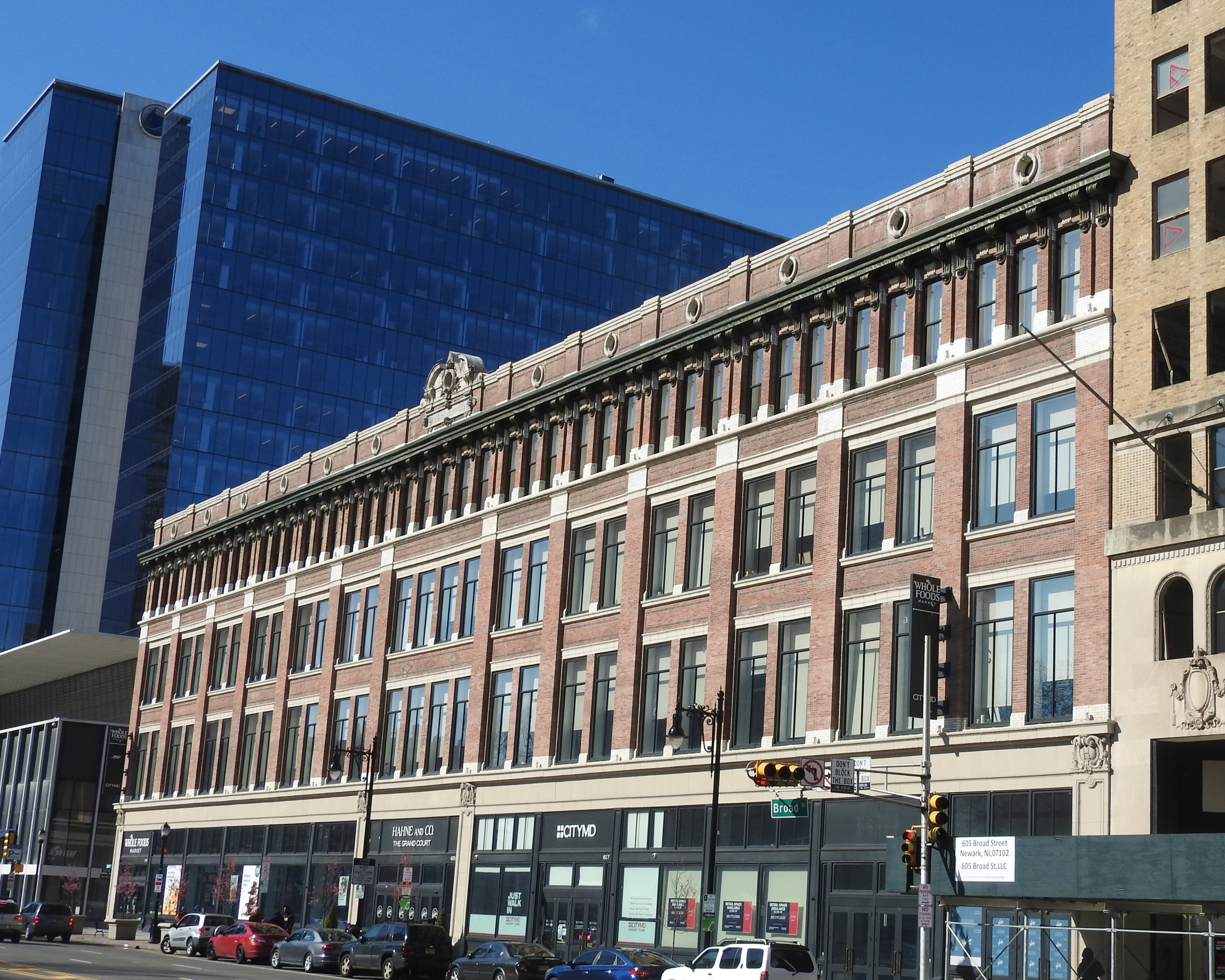
Hahne and Company Department Store, Newark, New Jersey, 1901.

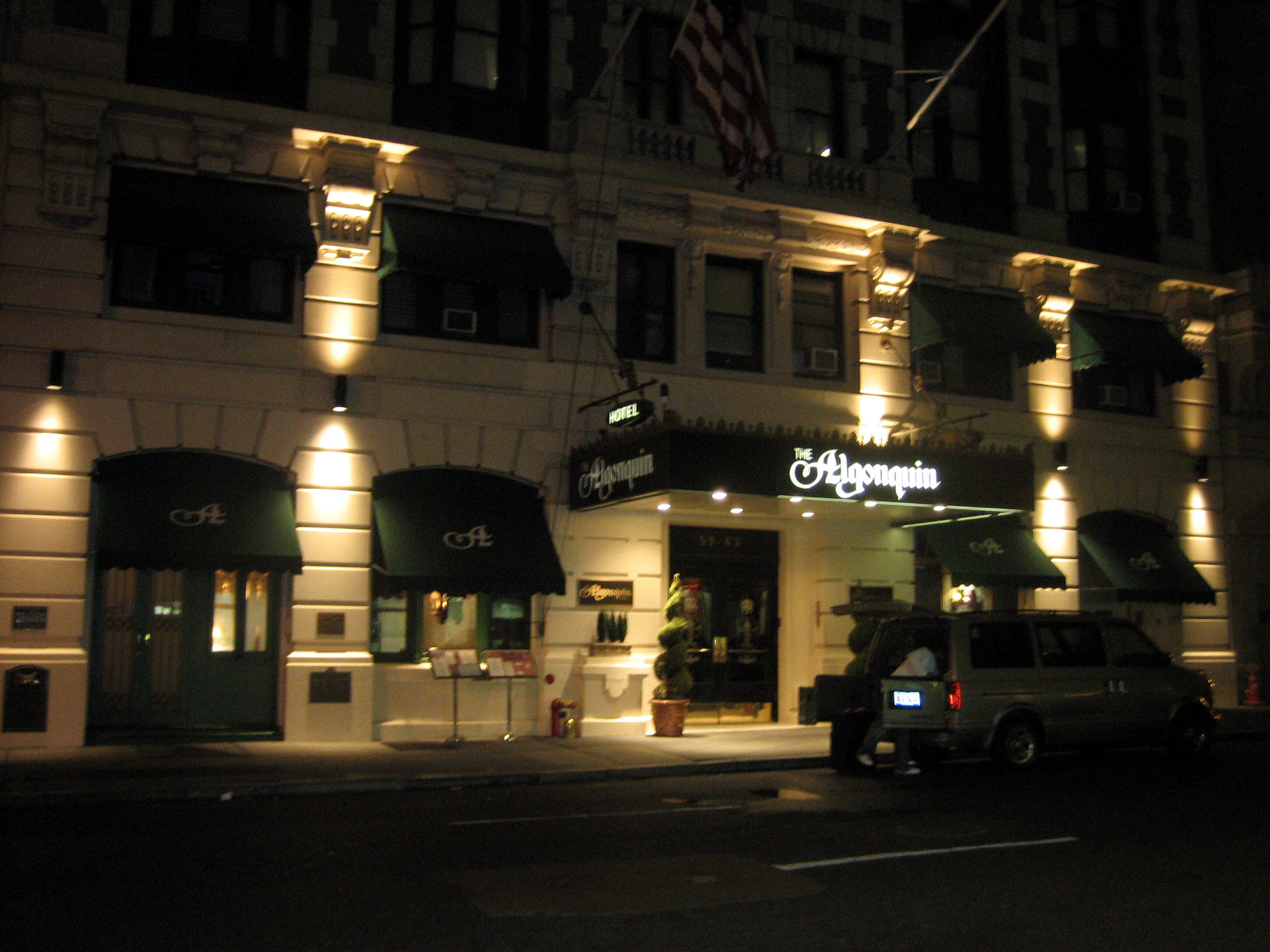
Algonquin Hotel, New York, New York, 1902.

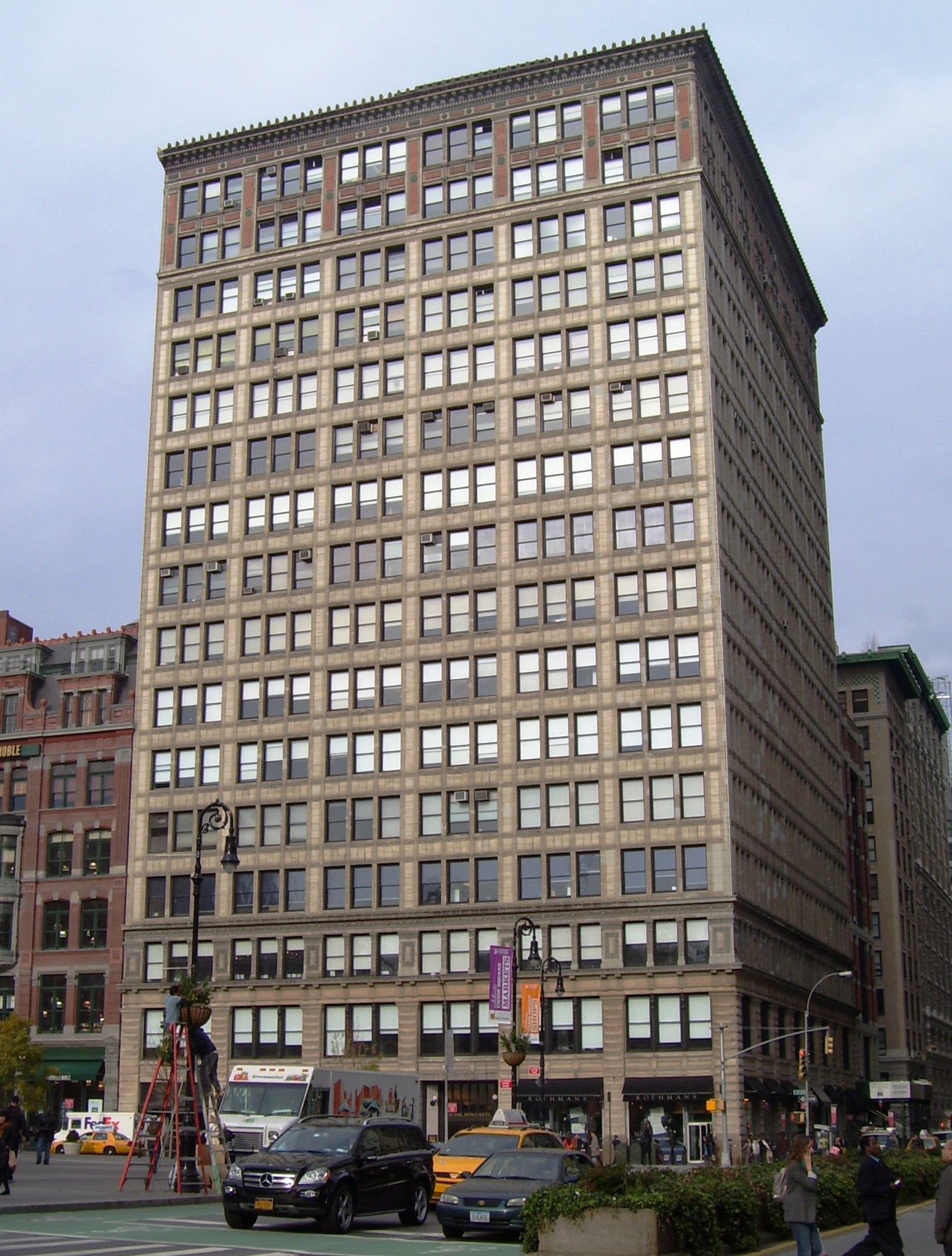
Everett Building, New York, New York, 1908.

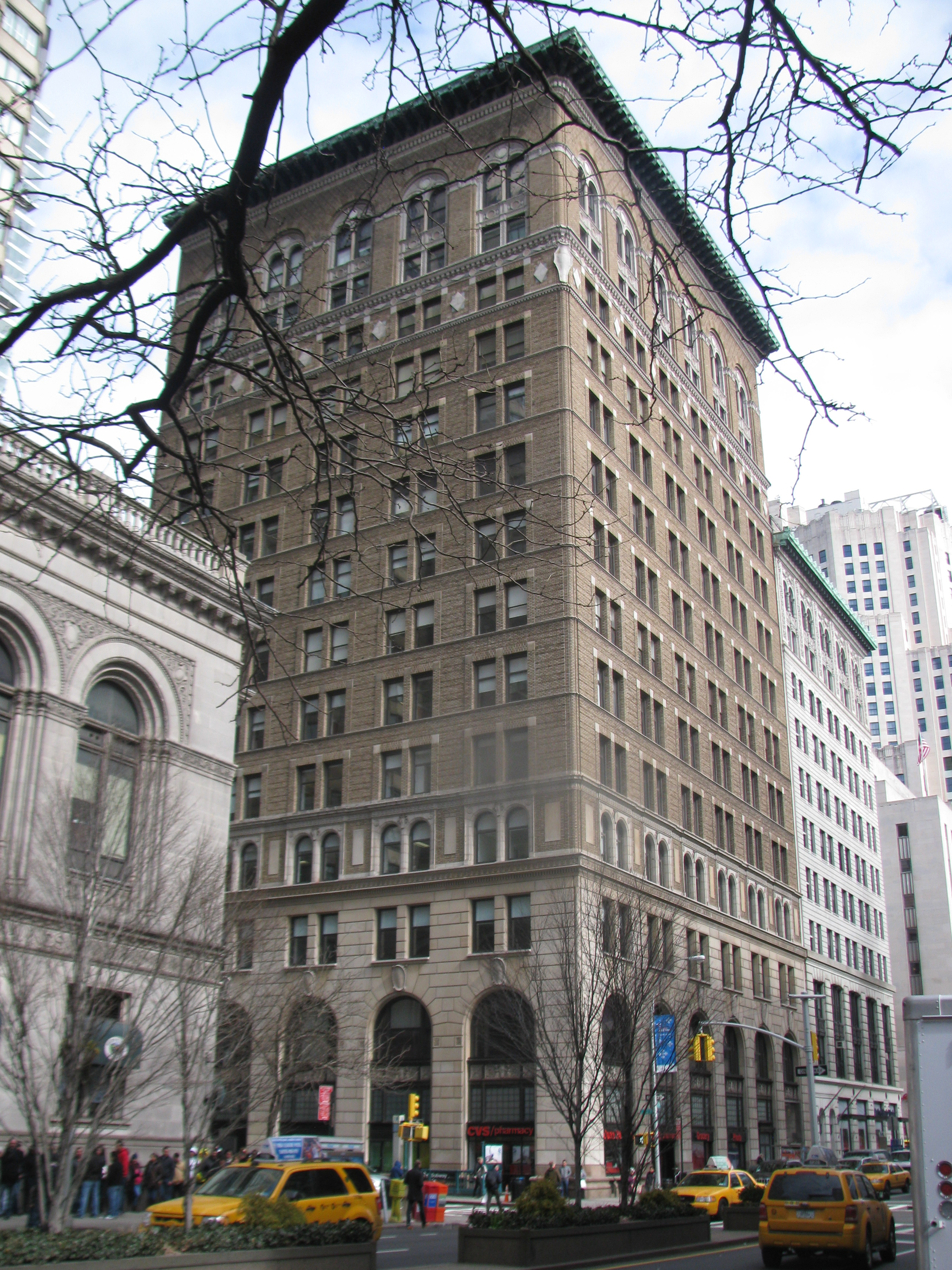
300 Park Avenue South, New York, New York, 1911.

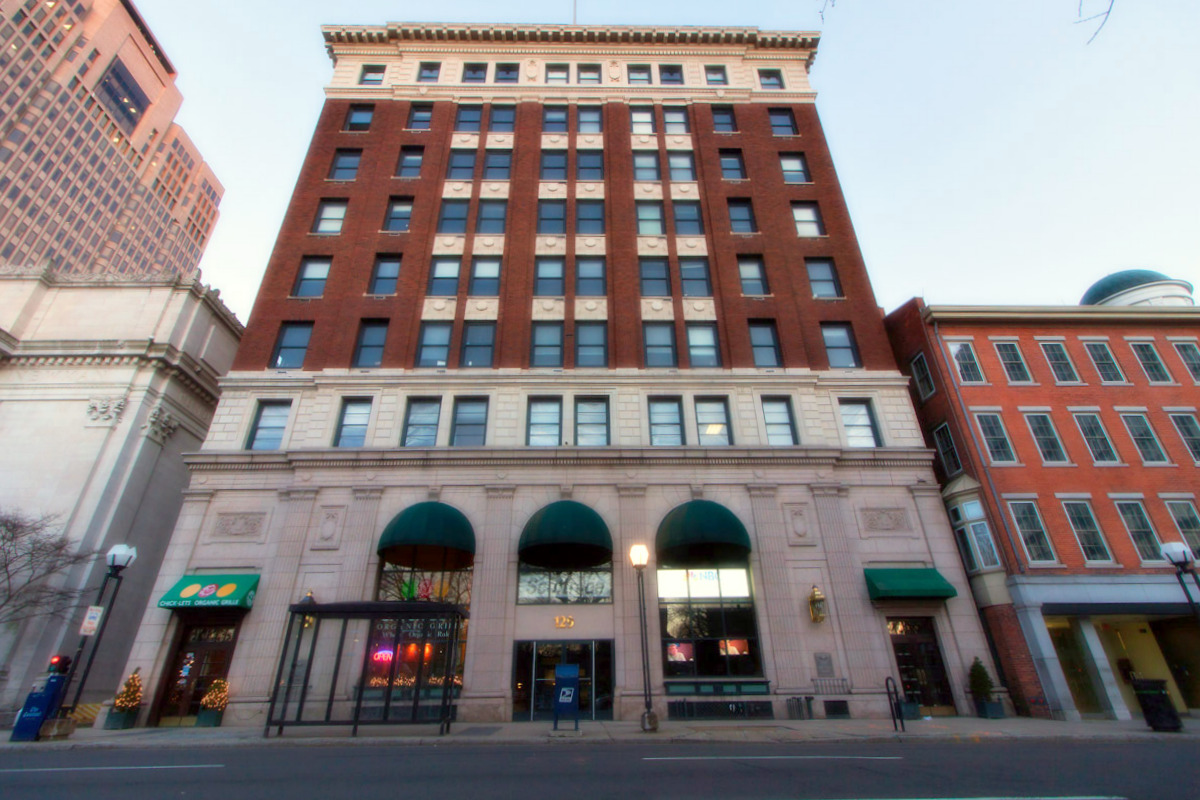
Second National Bank Building, New Haven, Connecticut, 1912-13.

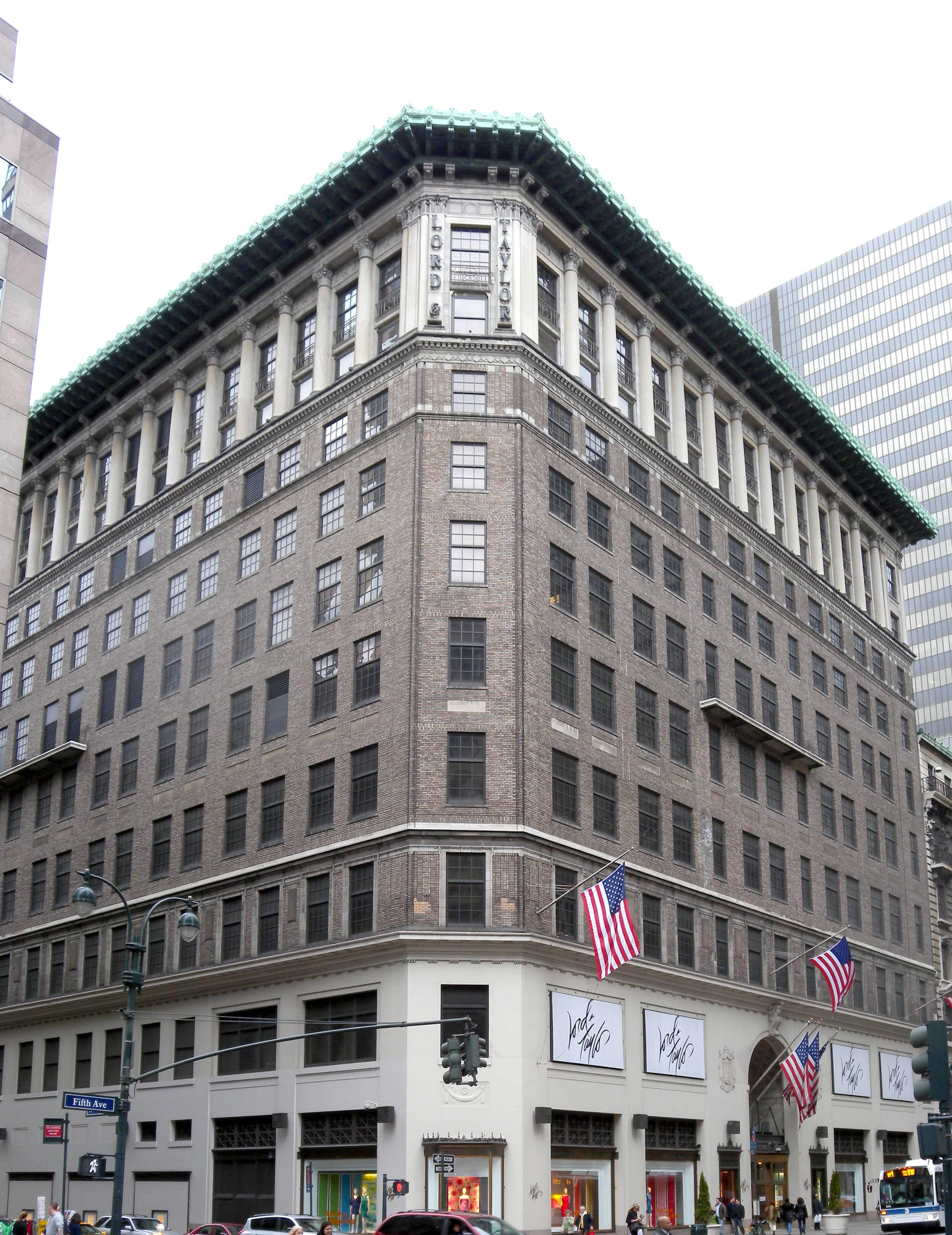
Lord & Taylor Building New York, New York, 1913-14.

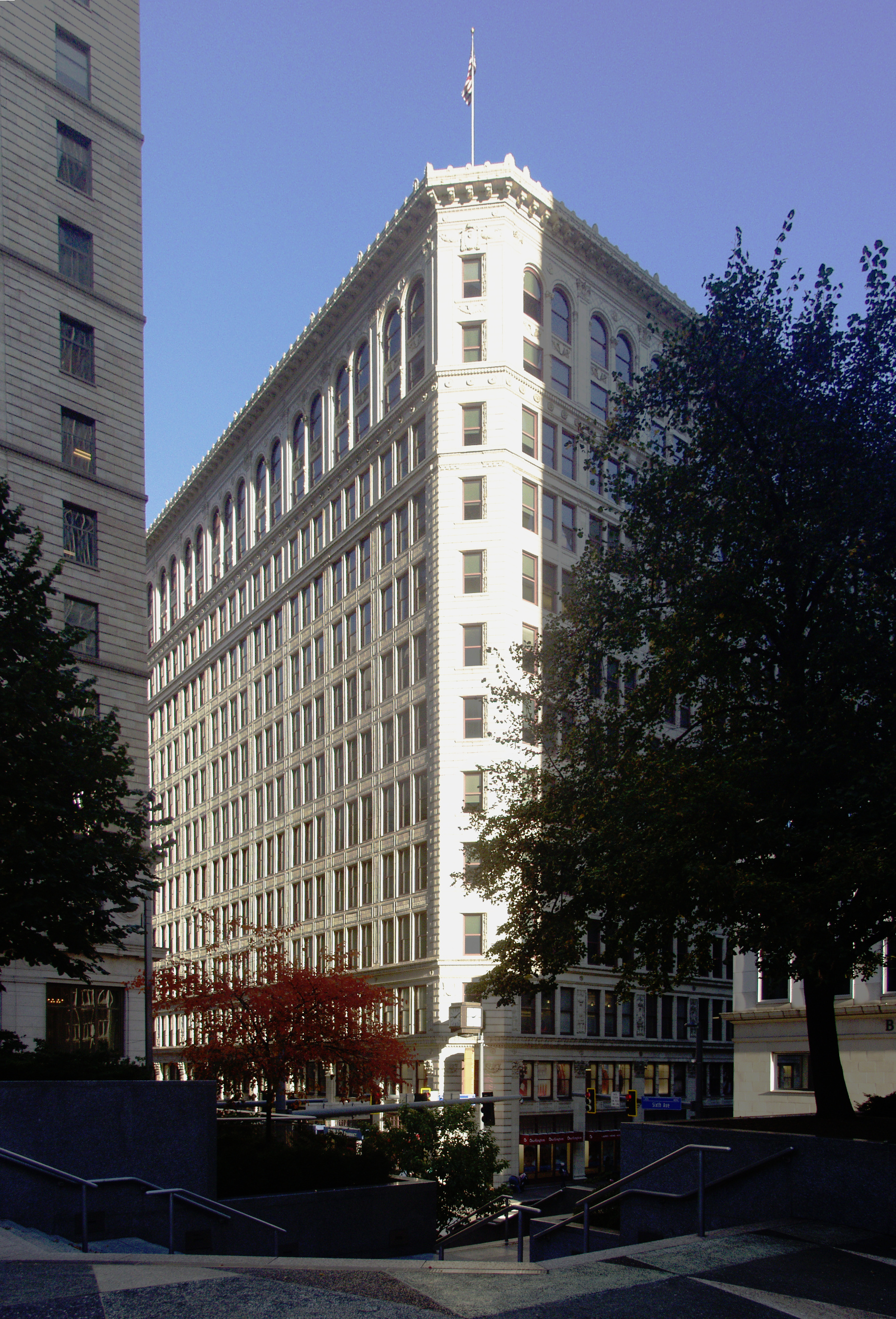
Kaufmann & Baer Department Store, Pittsburgh, Pennsylvania, 1914.

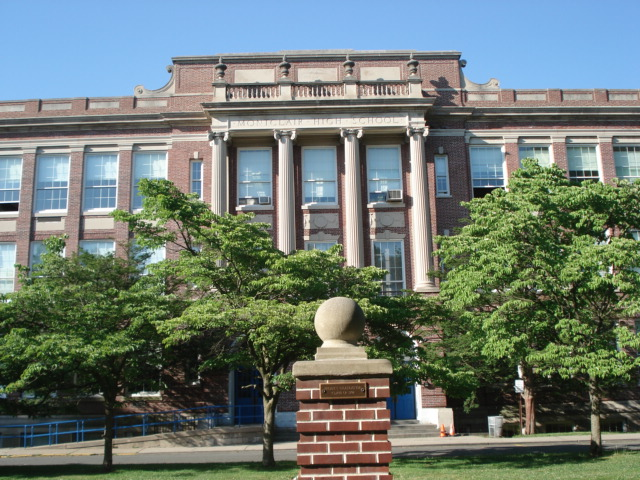
Montclair High School, Montclair, New Jersey, 1915.

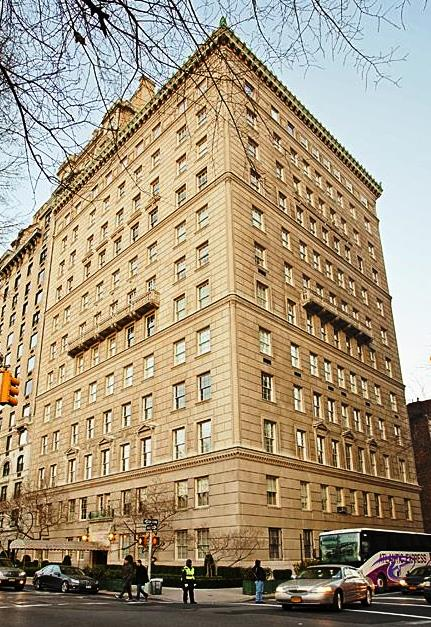
820 Fifth Avenue, New York, New York, 1916.

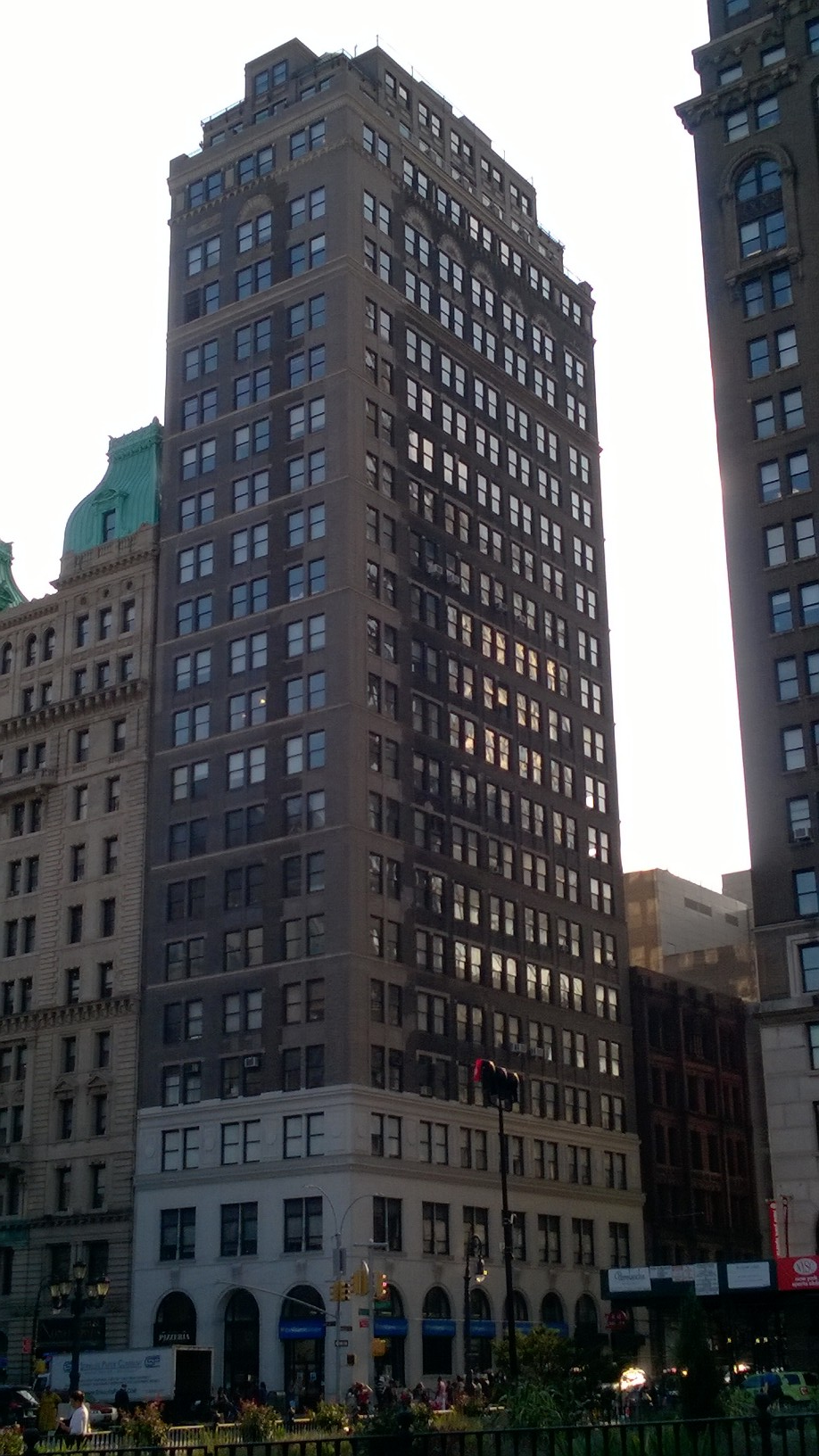
32 Court Street, Brooklyn, New York, 1917-18.

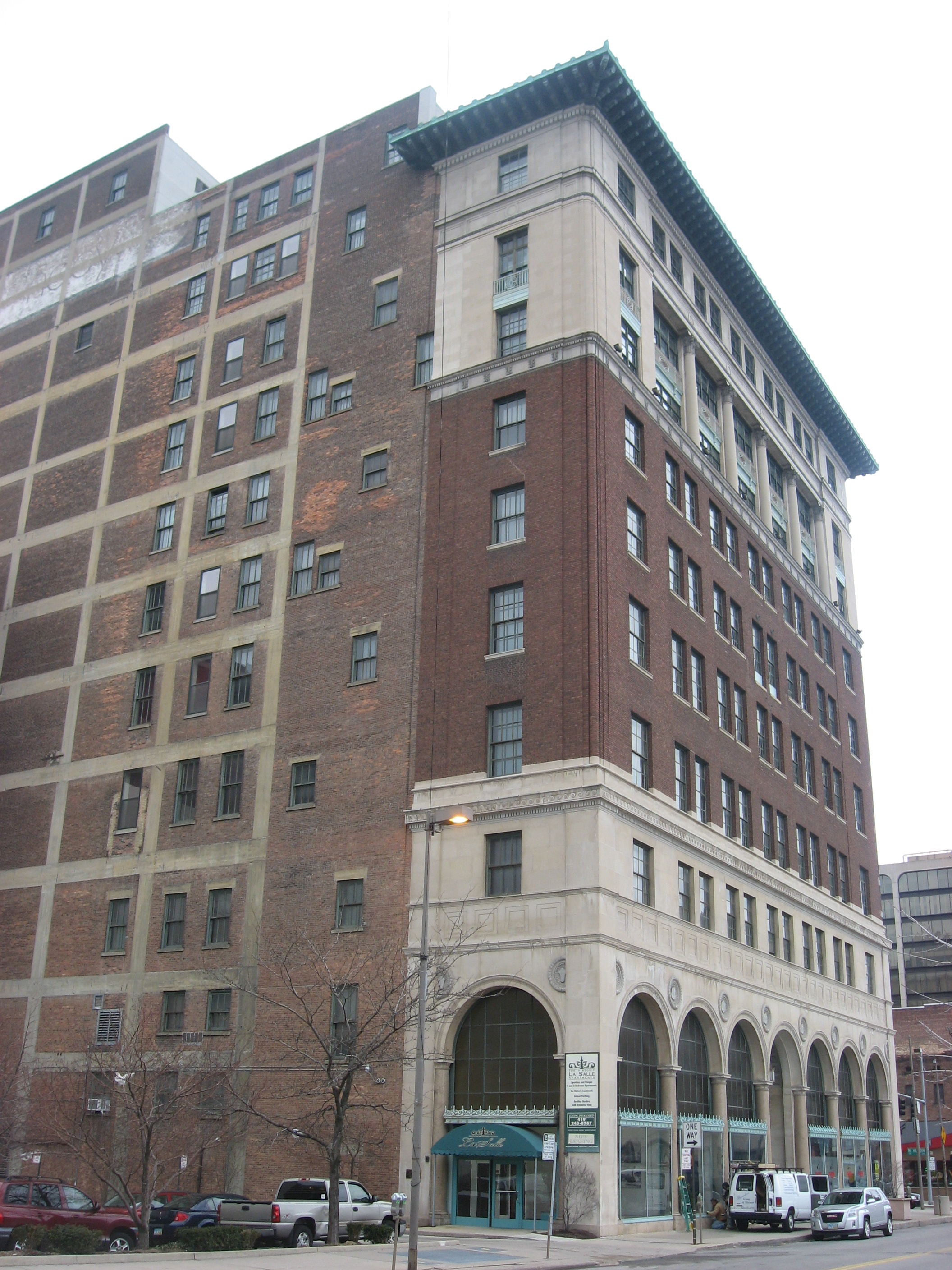
Lasalle, Koch and Company Department Store, Toledo, Ohio, 1917.

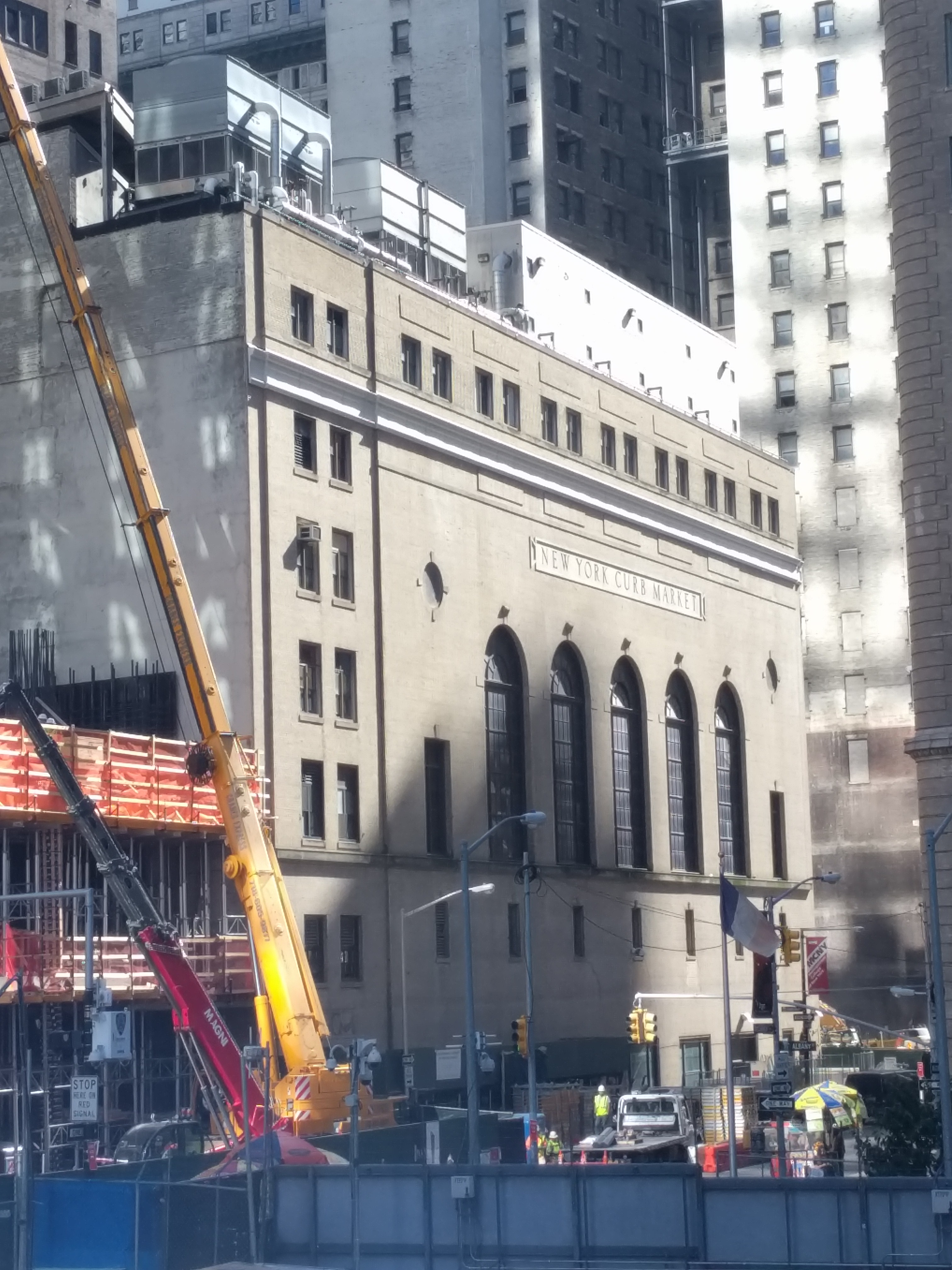
American Stock Exchange Building, New York, New York, 1920-21.

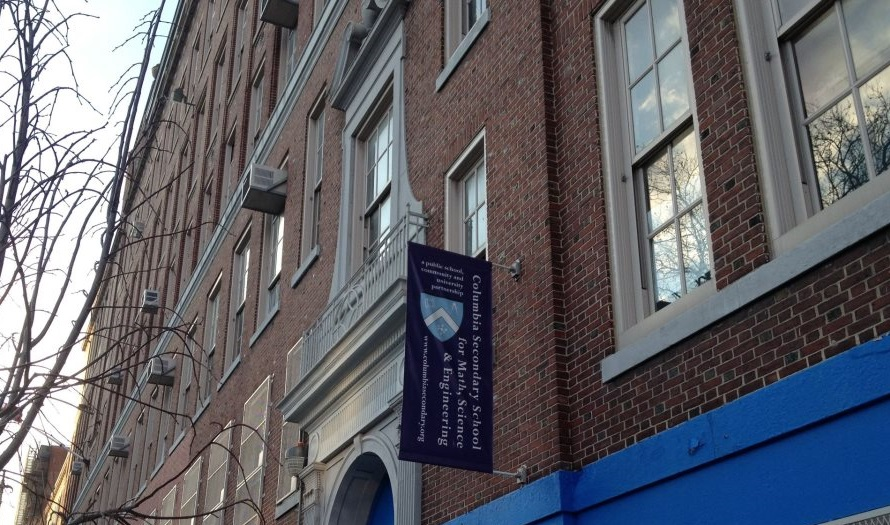
Lincoln School of Teachers College, New York, New York, 1921.

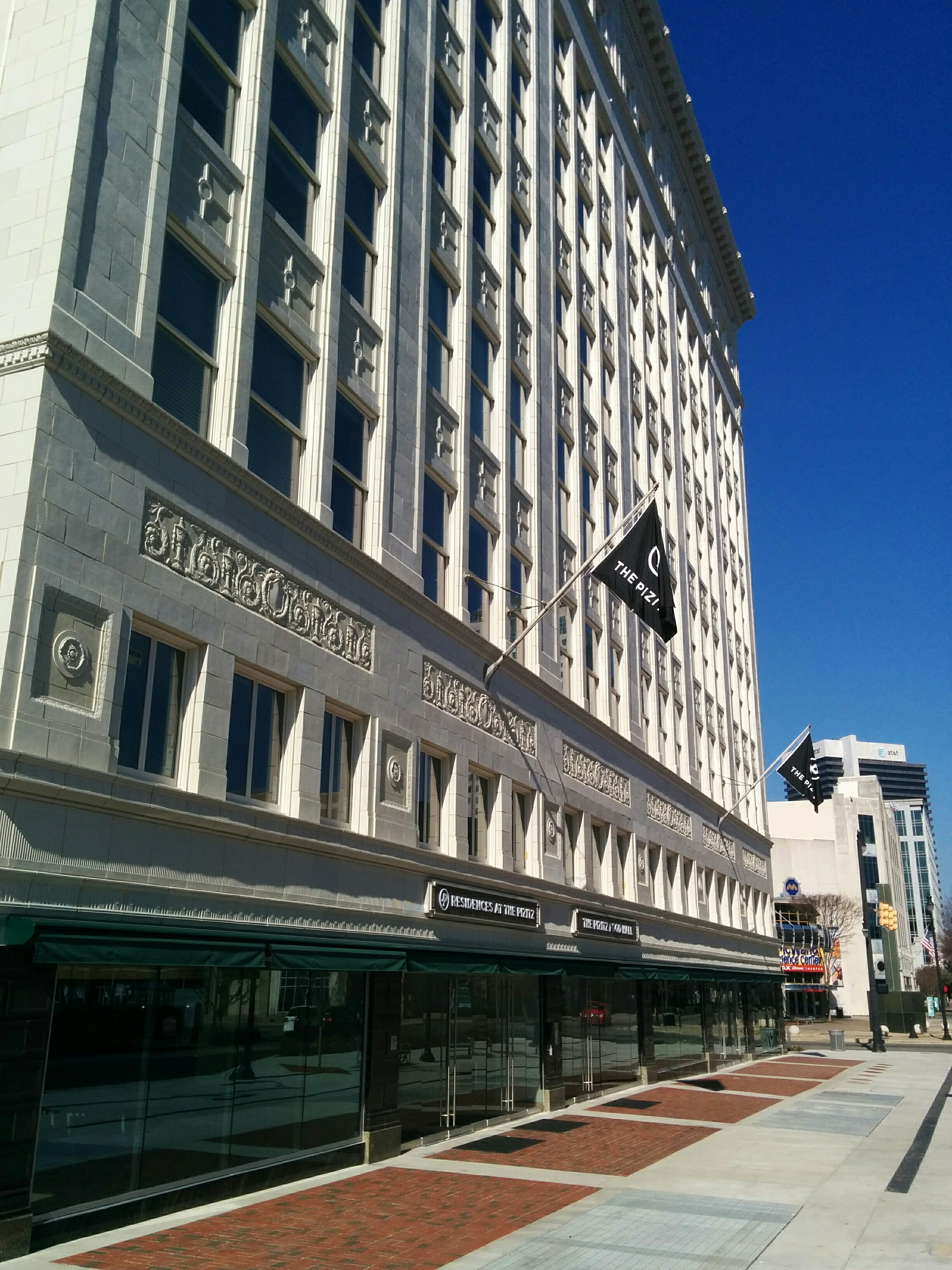
Pizitz Building, Birmingham, Alabama, 1922.

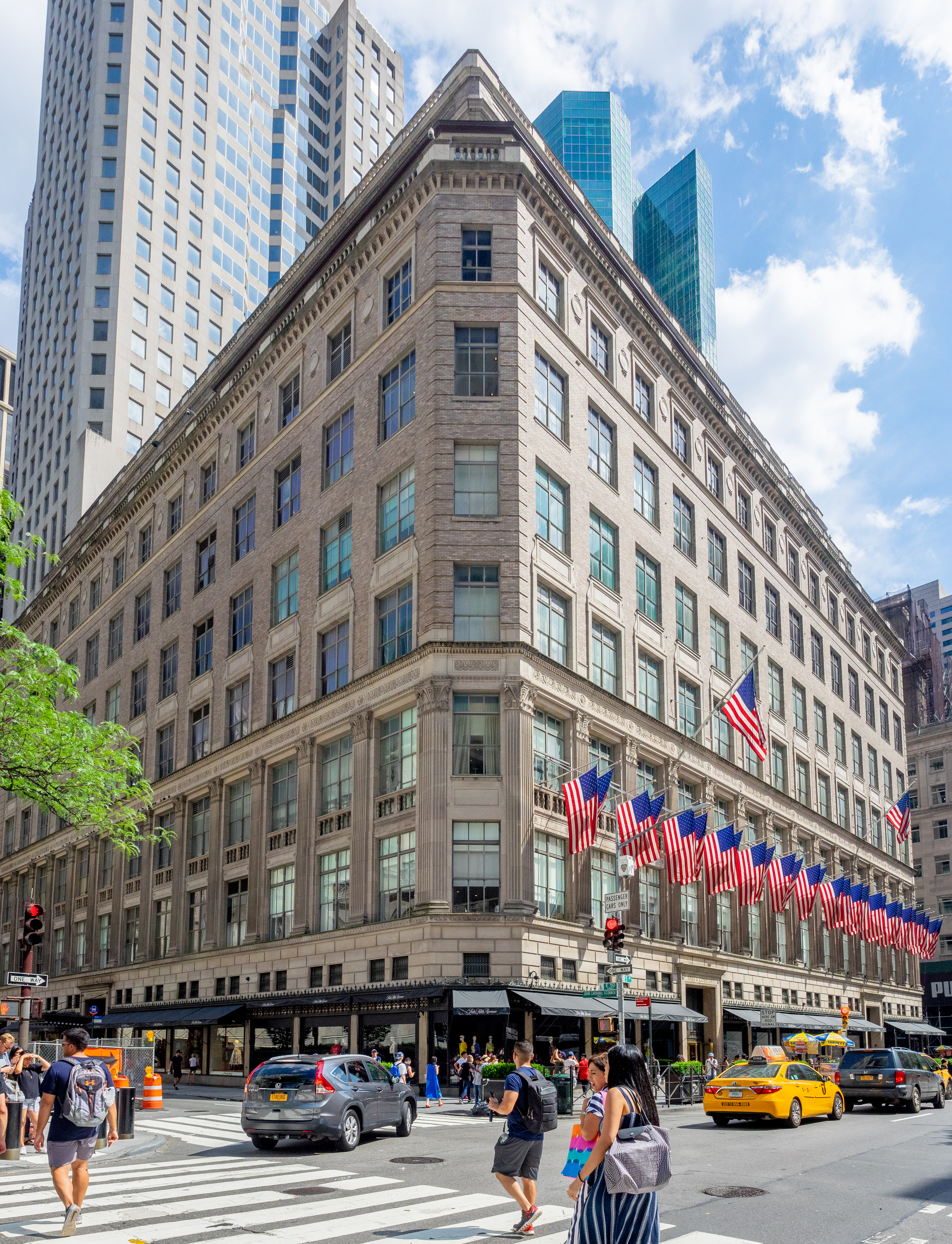
Saks Fifth Avenue Building, New York, New York, 1922-24.

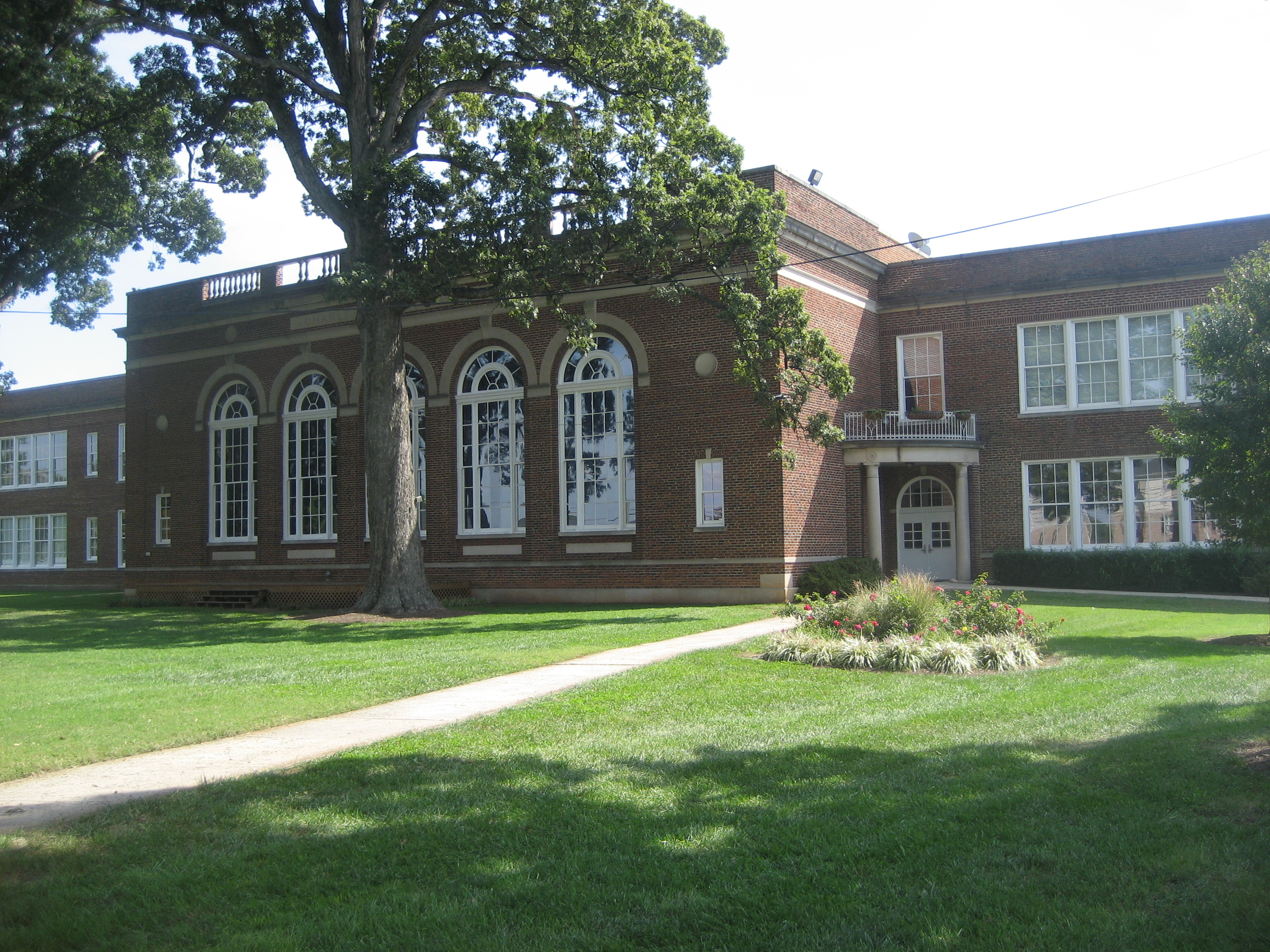
Charles D. McIver School, Greensboro, North Carolina, 1923.

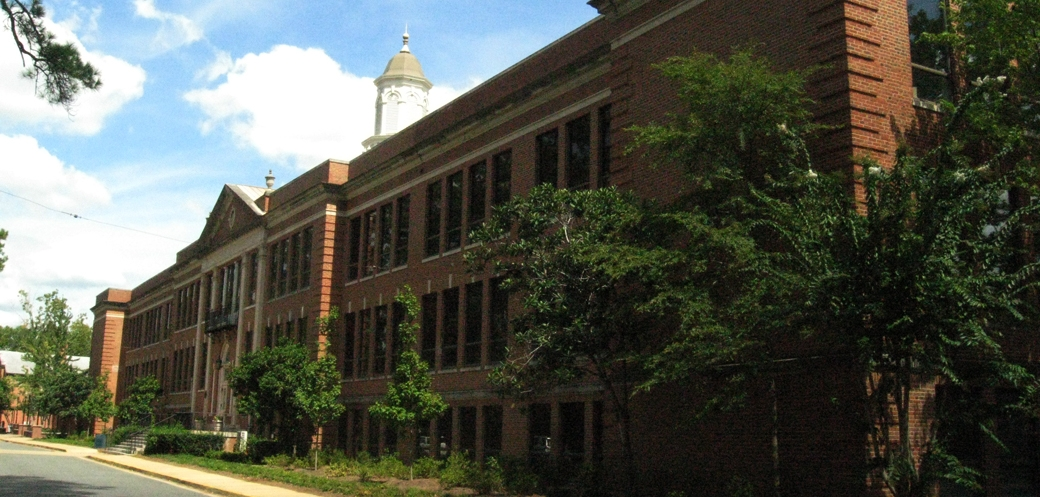
Columbus High School, Columbus, Georgia, 1925-26.

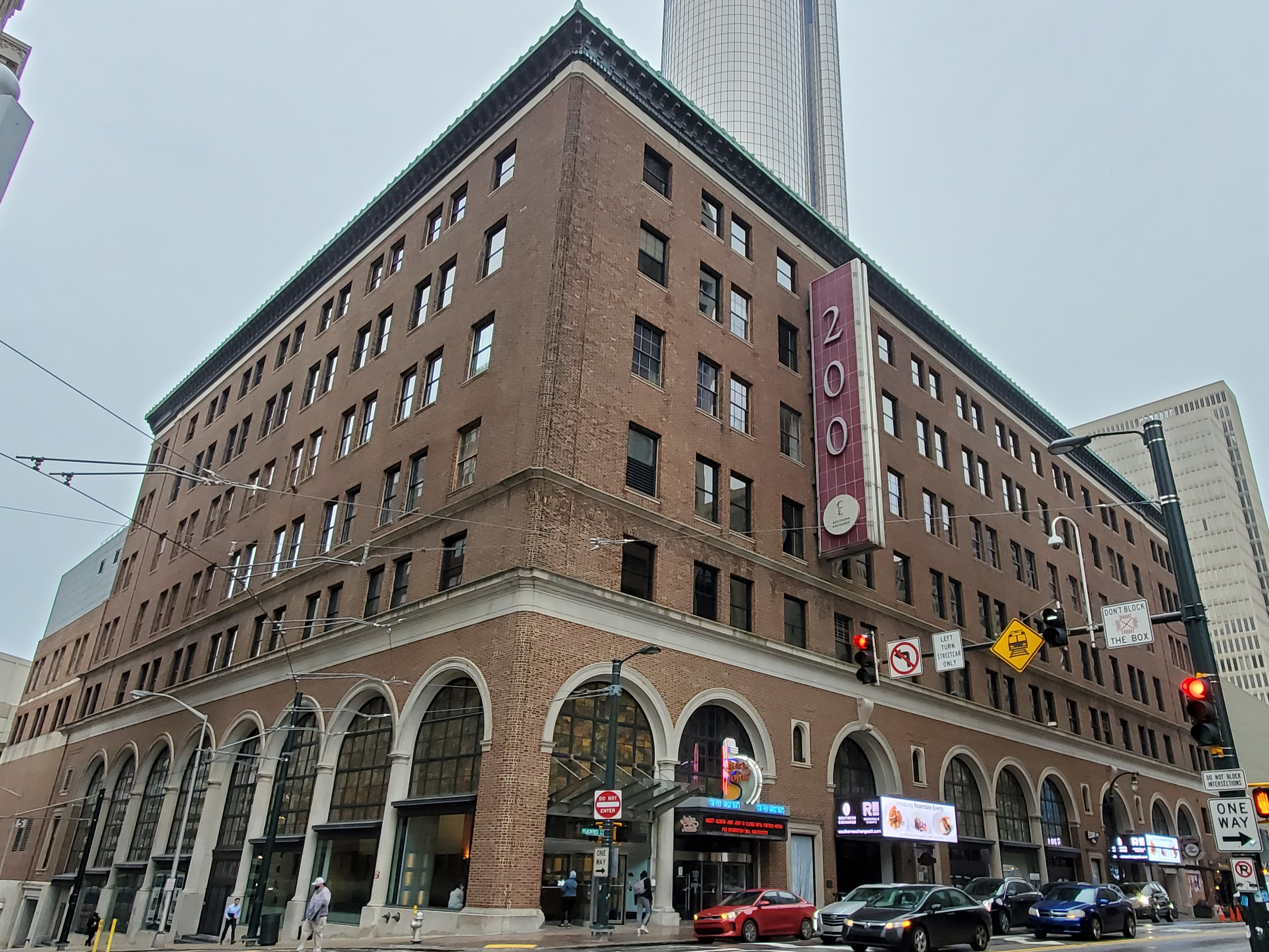
Davison's Department Store, Atlanta, Georgia, 1925-27.

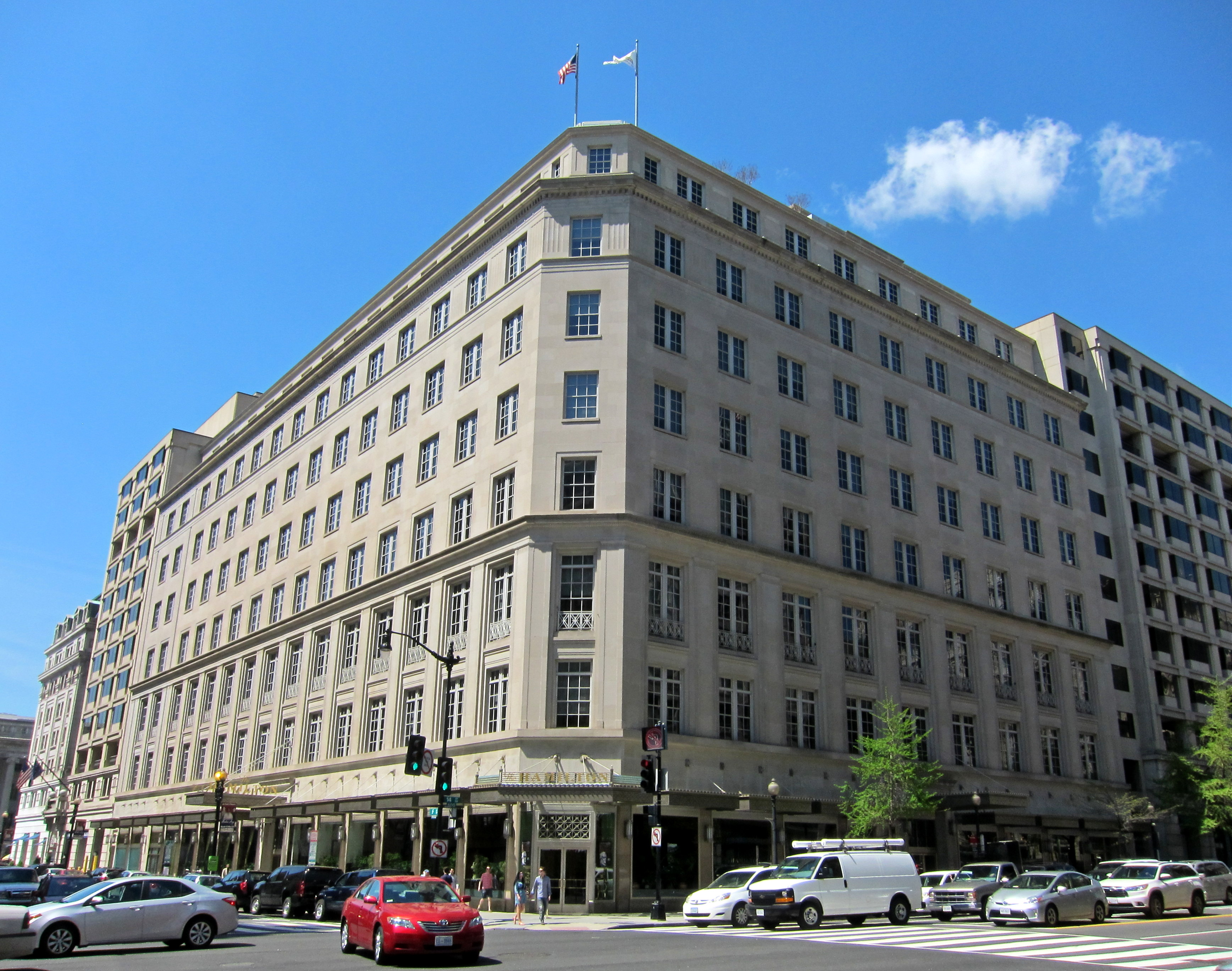
Garfinckel's Department Store, Washington, D.C., 1925-29.

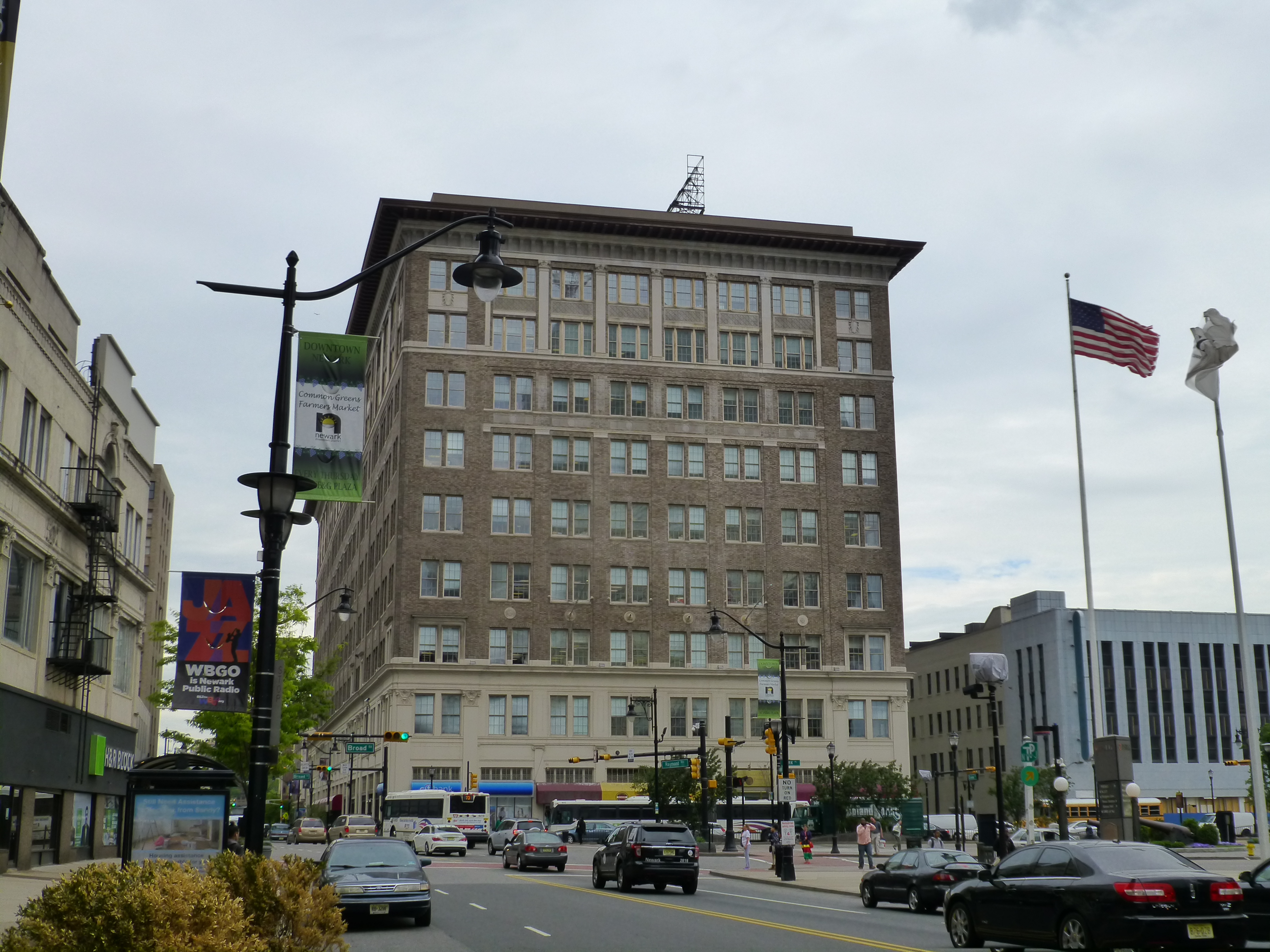
Kresge-Newark Department Store, Newark, New Jersey, 1925-26.

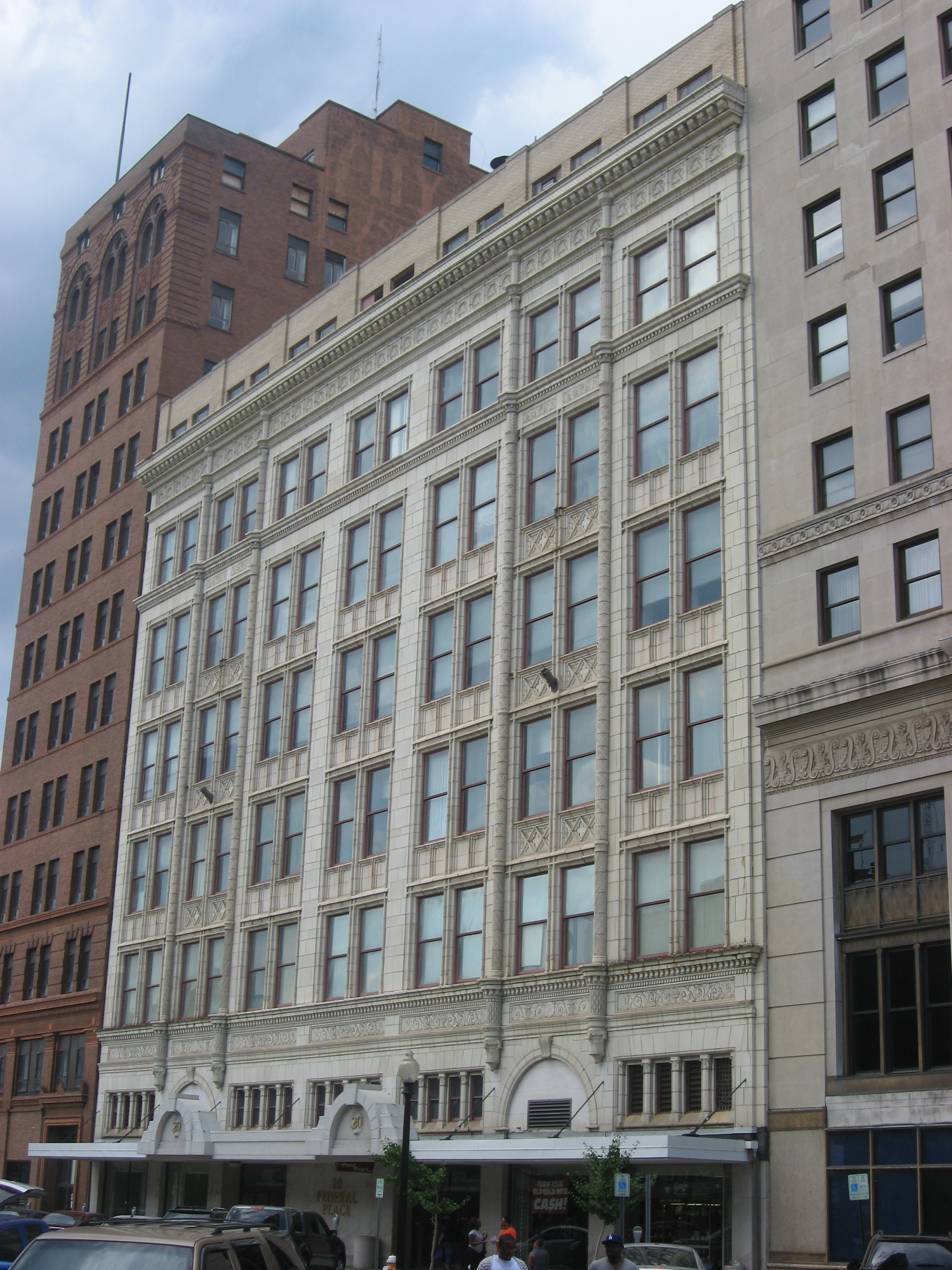
Strouss-Hirshberg Department Store, Youngstown, Ohio, 1926.

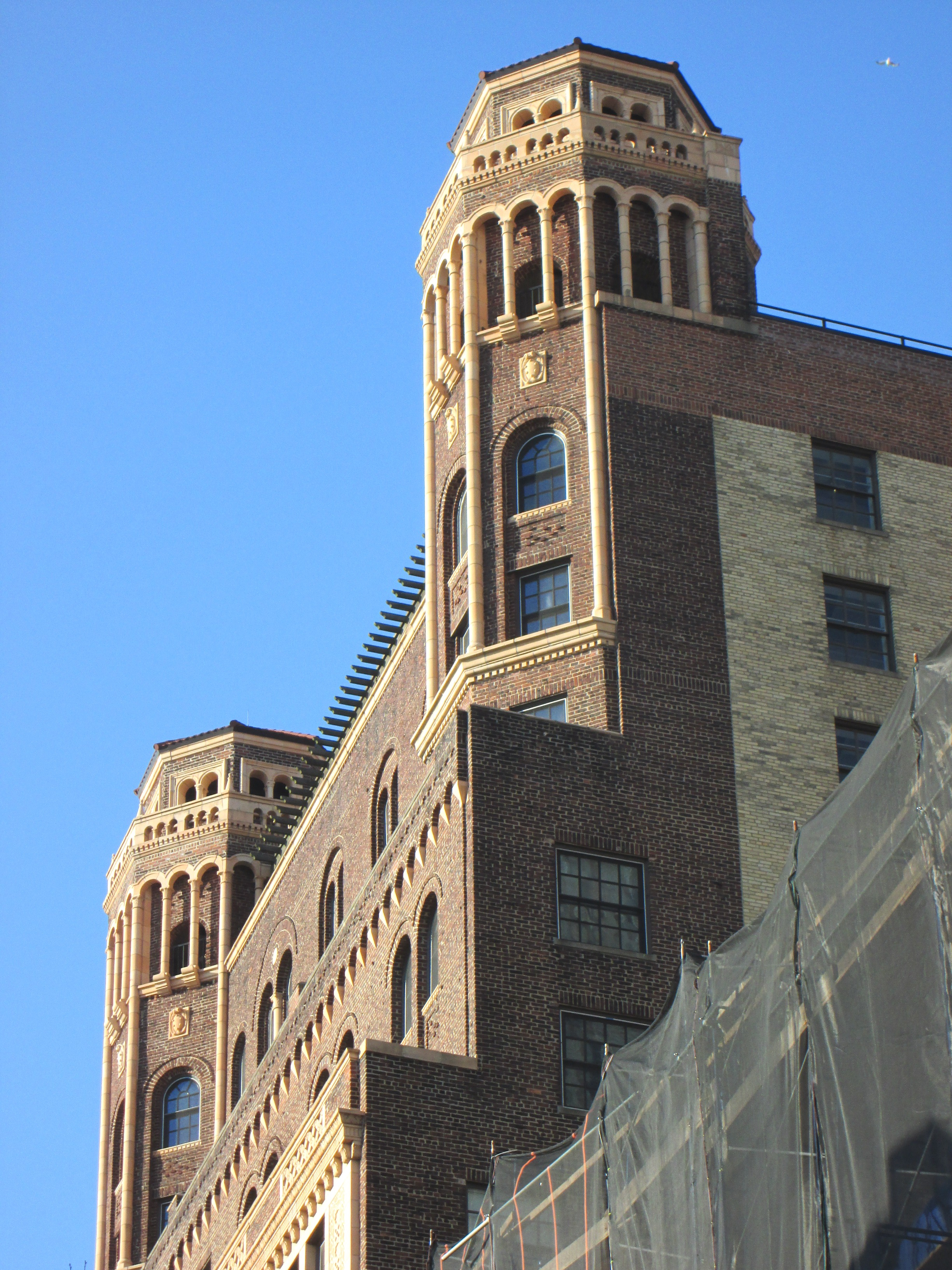
Leverich Towers Hotel, Brooklyn, New York, 1928.

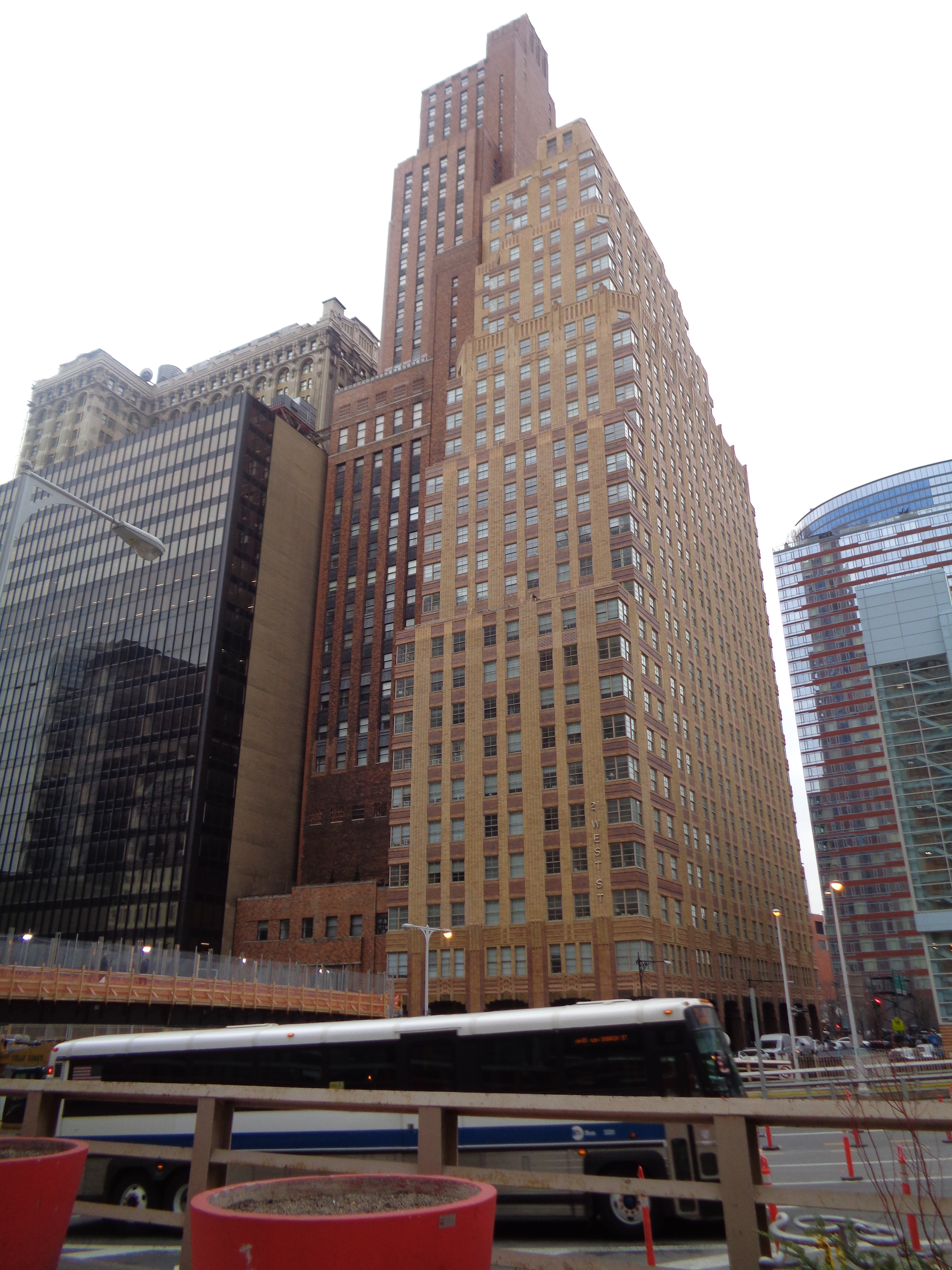
21 West Street (R) and the Downtown Athletic Club (L), New York, New York, 1929-31.

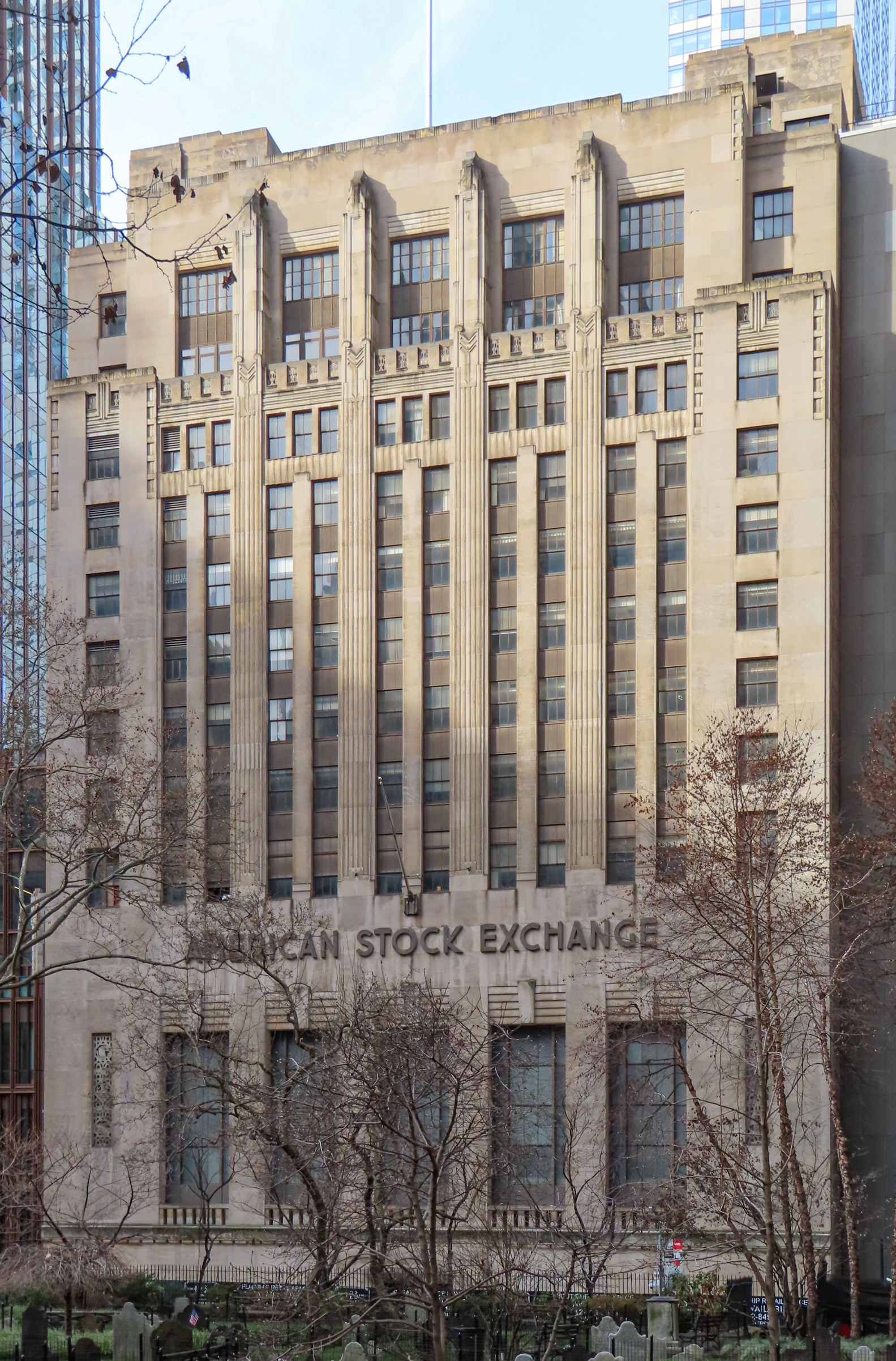
American Stock Exchange Building Annex, New York, New York, 1930-31.

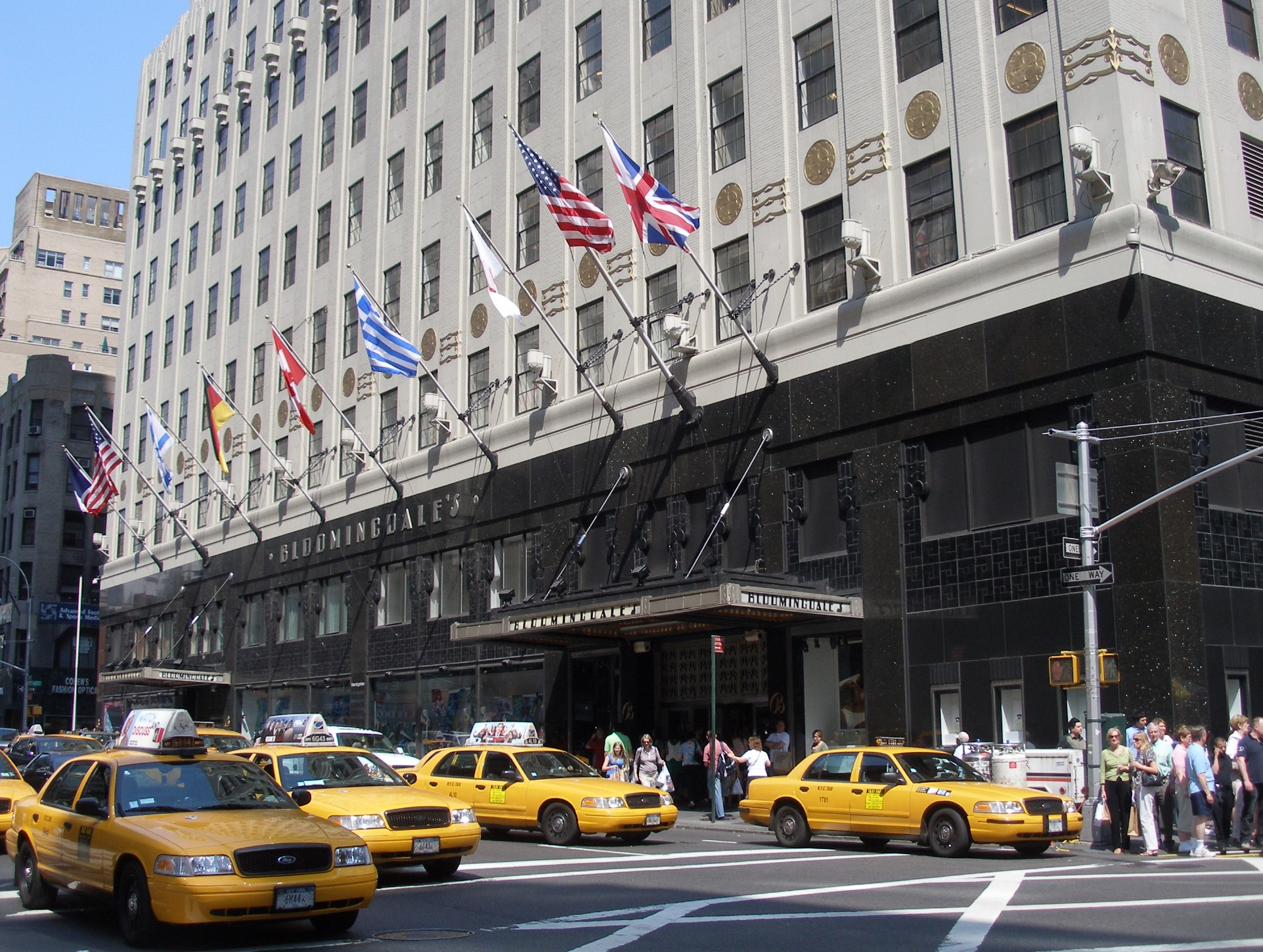
Bloomingdale's Department Store, New York, New York, 1930.

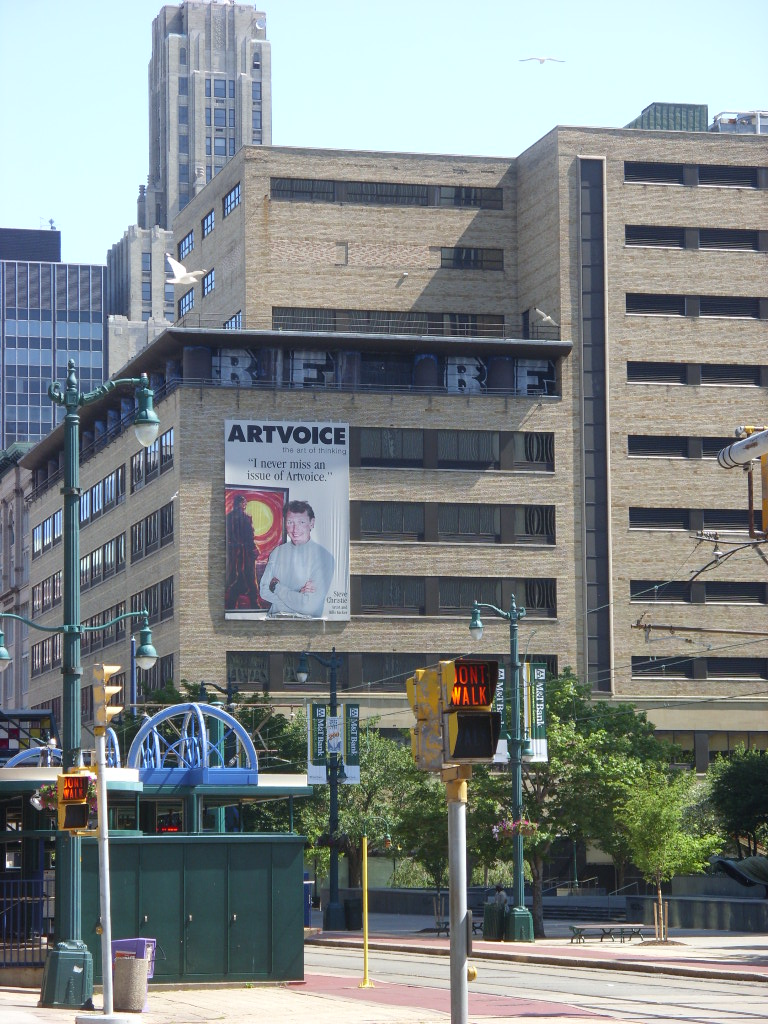
J. N. Adam & Company Department Store, Buffalo, New York, 1935 and 1946-48.

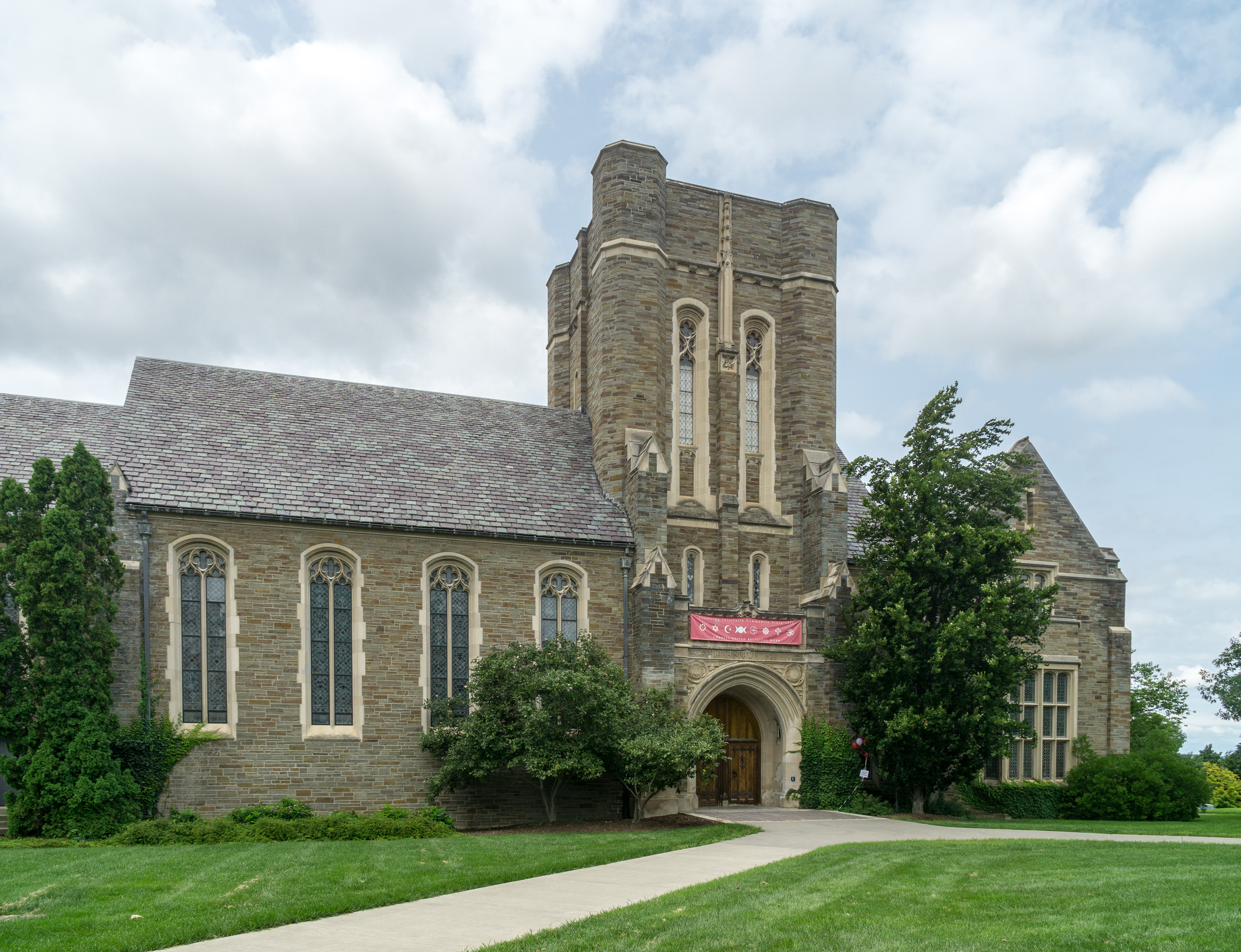
Anabel Taylor Hall, Cornell University, Ithaca, New York, 1953.

Von Cramm Cooperative Hall, Cornell University, Ithaca, New York, 1955-56.

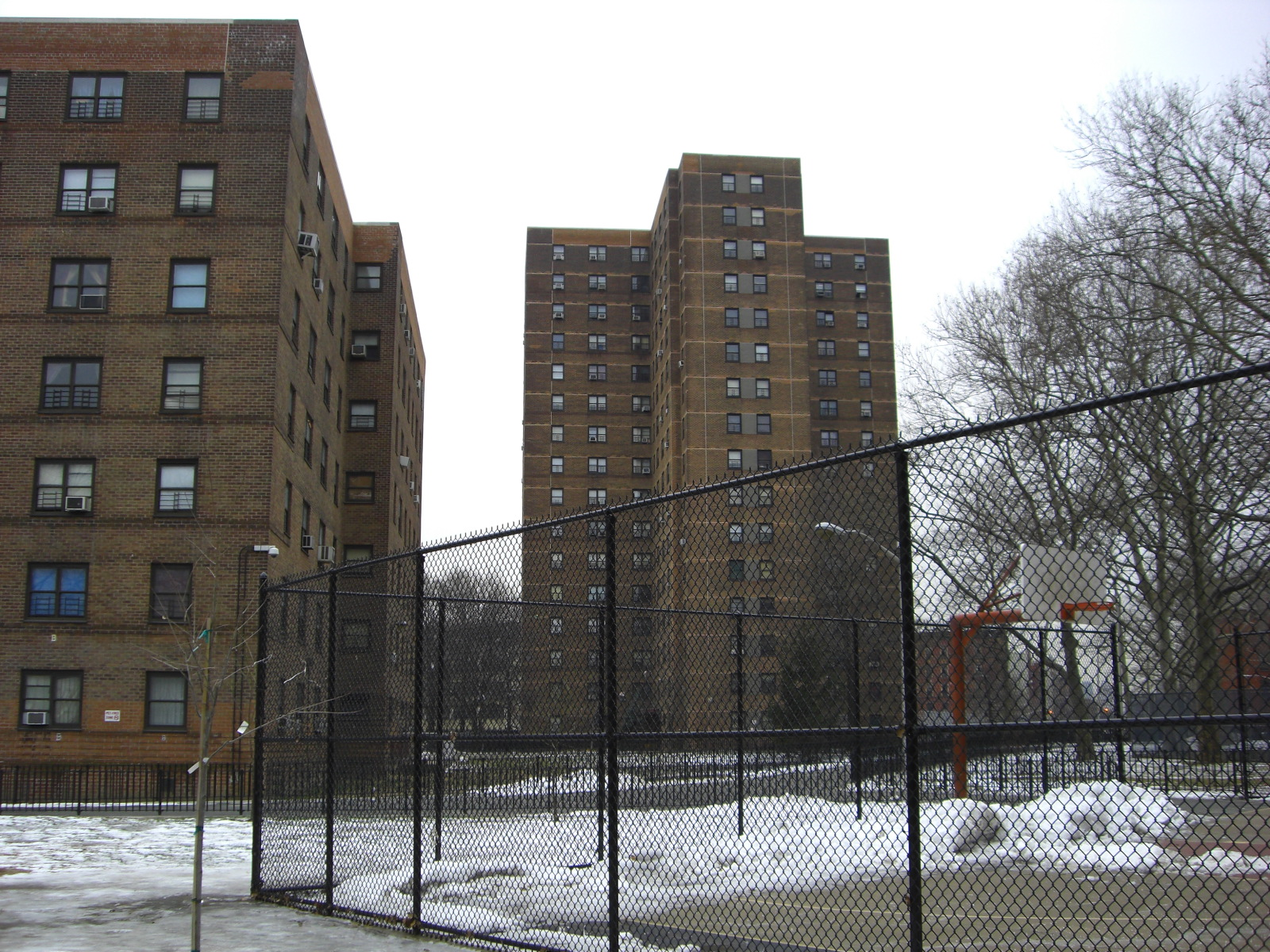
Robert F. Wagner Houses, New York, New York, 1956-58.

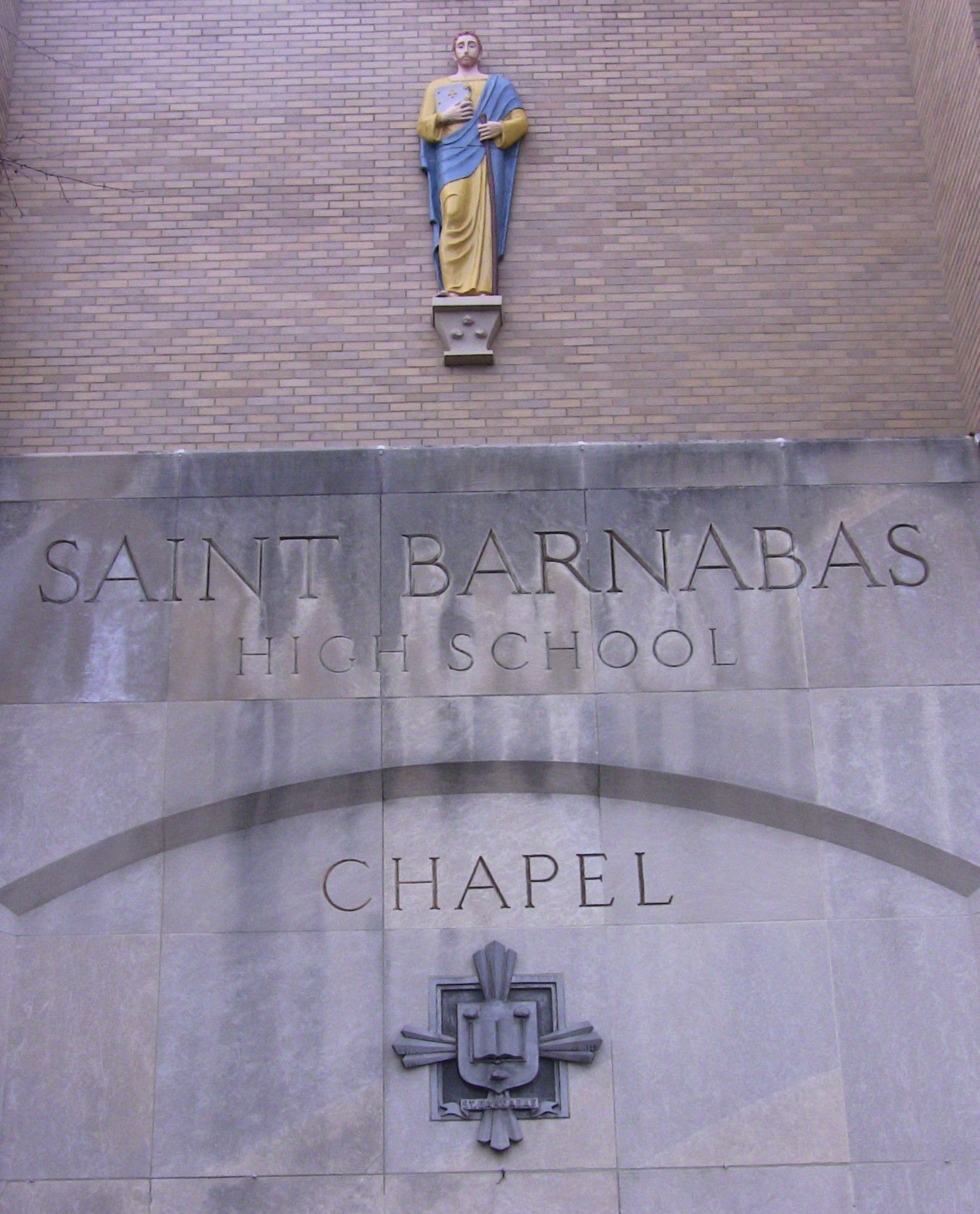
Detail of Saint Barnabas High School, Bronx, New York, 1957-59.

== See also ==
- Houses at 1026-1028 Fifth Ave., 1026-1028 Fifth Ave., New York, New York (Van Vleck & Goldsmith), NRHP-listed, designed by a Goldwin Goldsmith and a Van Vleck, very similar in name to Goldwin Starrett and Van Vleck
- First Methodist Episcopal Church, 24 N. Fullerton Ave., Montclair, New Jersey (Van Vleck & Goldsmith), NRHP-listed, designed by a Goldwin Goldsmith and a Van Vleck, very similar in name to Goldwin Starrett and Van Vleck
