= 333 East 38th Street =

Commercial building in Manhattan, New York

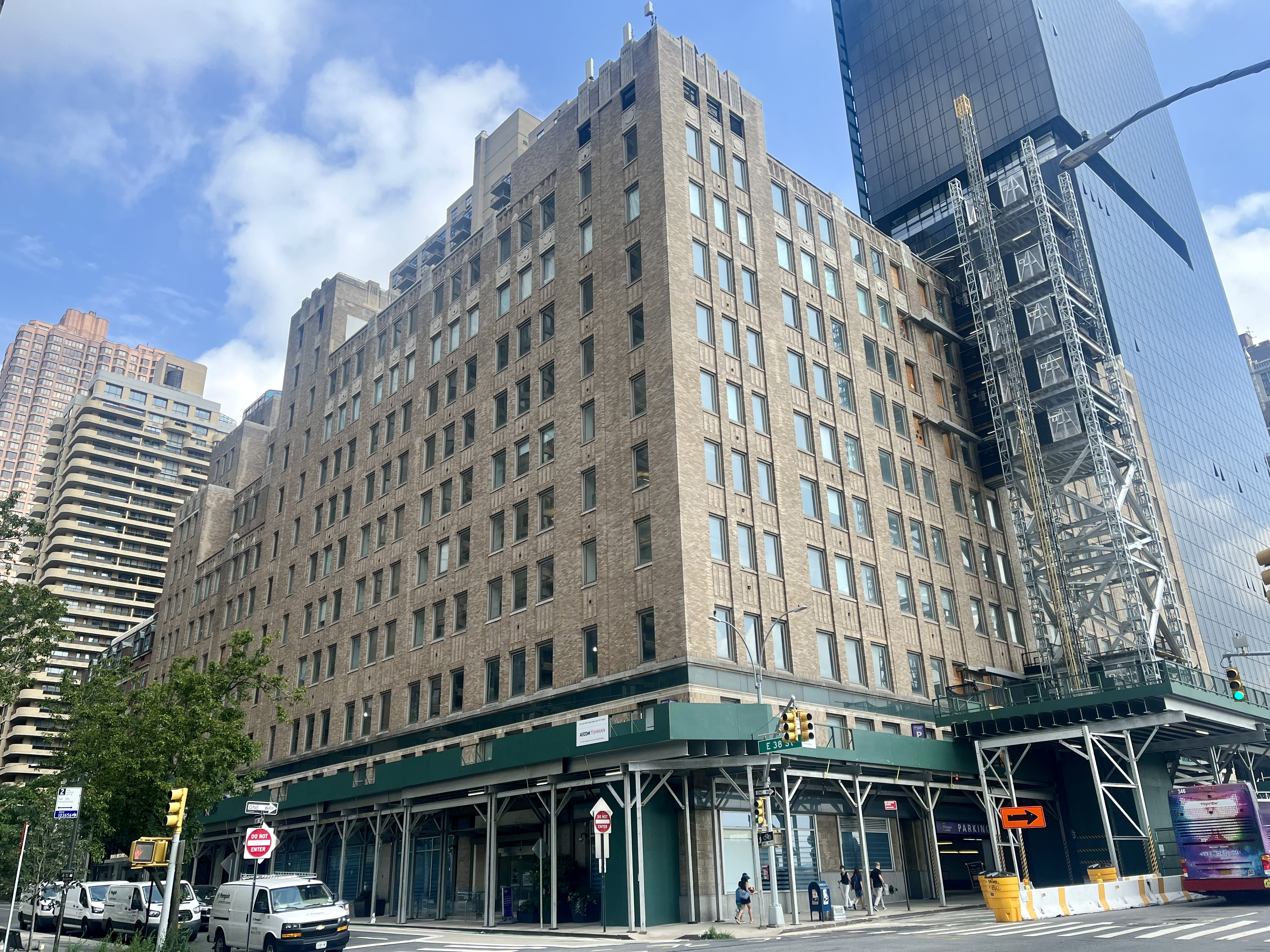
- 333 East 38th Street in 2023

General information
- Status: Completed
- Location: New York City, United States
- Coordinates: 40°44′48.5″N 73°58′19″W
- Year built: 1928
- Opened: April 17, 1929
- Renovated: 1989

Technical details
- Floor count: 12
- Floor area: 436,000 square feet (40,500 m^{2})

Design and construction
- Architecture firm: Starrett & van Vleck
- Main contractor: White Construction Company

Other information
- Parking: 146 spaces

333 East 38th Street is a 12-story commercial building in the Murray Hill neighborhood of Manhattan in New York City. Located on the west side of First Avenue between East 38th and 39th streets, the building was built in 1928 as a warehouse and distribution hub for the Eleto Company, which provided delivery services for merchandise sold by Lord & Taylor and James McCreery & Company. After the package deliveries for these department stores were contracted to United Parcel Service (UPS) in 1930, UPS became a major tenant in the building and the facility served as the company's corporate headquarters and main depot in the New York metropolitan area. UPS vacated the site in 1964 and since then the building has mostly been used as commercial and medical office space. It currently houses NYU Langone Health's Orthopedic Center and Outpatient Surgery Center.

== History ==
=== Eleto Company ===
In October 1927, the Eleto Company filed plans to construct a garage and warehouse facility on the west side of First Avenue between East 38th and 39th streets. The building was designed to accommodate the delivery services the company provided for department stores and a warehouse to replace its existing facility at 153 East 24th Street in Rose Hill. A subsidiary of the Associated Dry Goods Corporation, the Eleto Company was organized in 1916 to handle the package deliveries of the Lord & Taylor and James McCreery & Company department stores, each of which previously had handled its own deliveries to retail customers. The building was designed by Starrett & van Vleck, an architecture firm whose works in the early twentieth century included a number of department stores such as the Lord & Taylor Building on Fifth Avenue between 38th and 39th streets.

Property for the new building was acquired by the Eleto Company in June and July 1927; the land encompassed the entire blockfront along the west side of First Avenue and included 175 feet (53 m) of frontage on East 38th Street and 125 feet (38 m) of frontage on East 39th Street; these lots consisted of five- and six-story buildings. The extended frontage on East 38th Street allowed for a loading dock and elevators to serve the upper warehouse floors without interfering with the delivery operations on the first two floors and basement level.

Additional property was subsequently purchased on East 38th Street to increase the total frontage on the south side of the building to 225 feet (69 m). Updated plans for the building were filed in February 1928 and the construction was awarded to the White Construction Company. The facility was constructed using reinforced concrete and facing along the three street fronts included granite, limestone, terra-cotta, and tapestry brick. Steel cores were used in interior columns to reduce the amount of space occupied by the structural elements on the floors. The facility opened on April 17, 1929.

=== United Parcel Service ===
In July 1930, the package deliveries for department stores owned by the Associated Dry Goods Corporation, which included Lord & Taylor and James McCreery & Company in Manhattan and the Hahne and Company of Newark, were contracted to the United Parcel Service (UPS). As a result, UPS would become a major tenant in the Eleto Company's building. Until then, UPS operations had been limited to the West Coast of the United States. With the expansion of services to New York City, UPS also moved its corporate headquarters to the floors above its main hub at 331 East 38th Street.

With a decline in retail sales following the Wall Street Crash of 1929 and the ensuing Great Depression, other department stores and specialty shops chose to outsource their deliveries to UPS and eliminate the costs of operating their own in-house delivery services. UPS expanded its operations to serve 158 stores within the New York metropolitan area within its first year. It began providing deliveries for Bloomingdale's, Saks Fifth Avenue, and Gimbels in 1934. In 1946, Macy's and Bamberger's were the last major department stores in the area to have their delivery services taken over by UPS. The facility at 331 East 38th Street served as UPS' primary depot in the metropolitan area and was used to collect goods picked up from stores and sorted for deliveries to retail customers and to over fifty sub-depots located in the five boroughs of New York City, Long Island, Westchester, southern Connecticut, and northern New Jersey.

The building was sold by the Eleto Company to the Seebee Corporation in 1944, but continued to be occupied by UPS and function as a service building for Lord & Taylor and James McCreery & Company. In 1955, a group of tennis players that lost their tennis courts on Sutton Place to the development of an apartment building formed Tennis Center, Inc., leased the rooftop of the building from the Seebee Corporation, and added three Har-Tru tennis courts plus a clubhouse. Membership in the tennis club was limited to sixty. In later years, the tennis courts were also available for rent to the public by appointment.

In 1959, UPS purchased property and filed plans to construct a new warehouse in Hell's Kitchen on the block bounded by Eleventh Avenue, Twelfth Avenue and West 43rd and 44th streets. The building on First Avenue was sold to a group of investors in 1961 and UPS vacated the facility in 1964.

=== Other uses ===
The group of investors that had purchased the building in 1961, which were organized as 673 First Avenue Associates, remodeled the structure to accommodate office and manufacturing uses. Tenants that moved into the building after the departure of UPS included Buick, Mercedes-Benz, Railway Express Agency, and UNICEF (United Nations International Children's Emergency Fund). The building was fully leased in 1966.

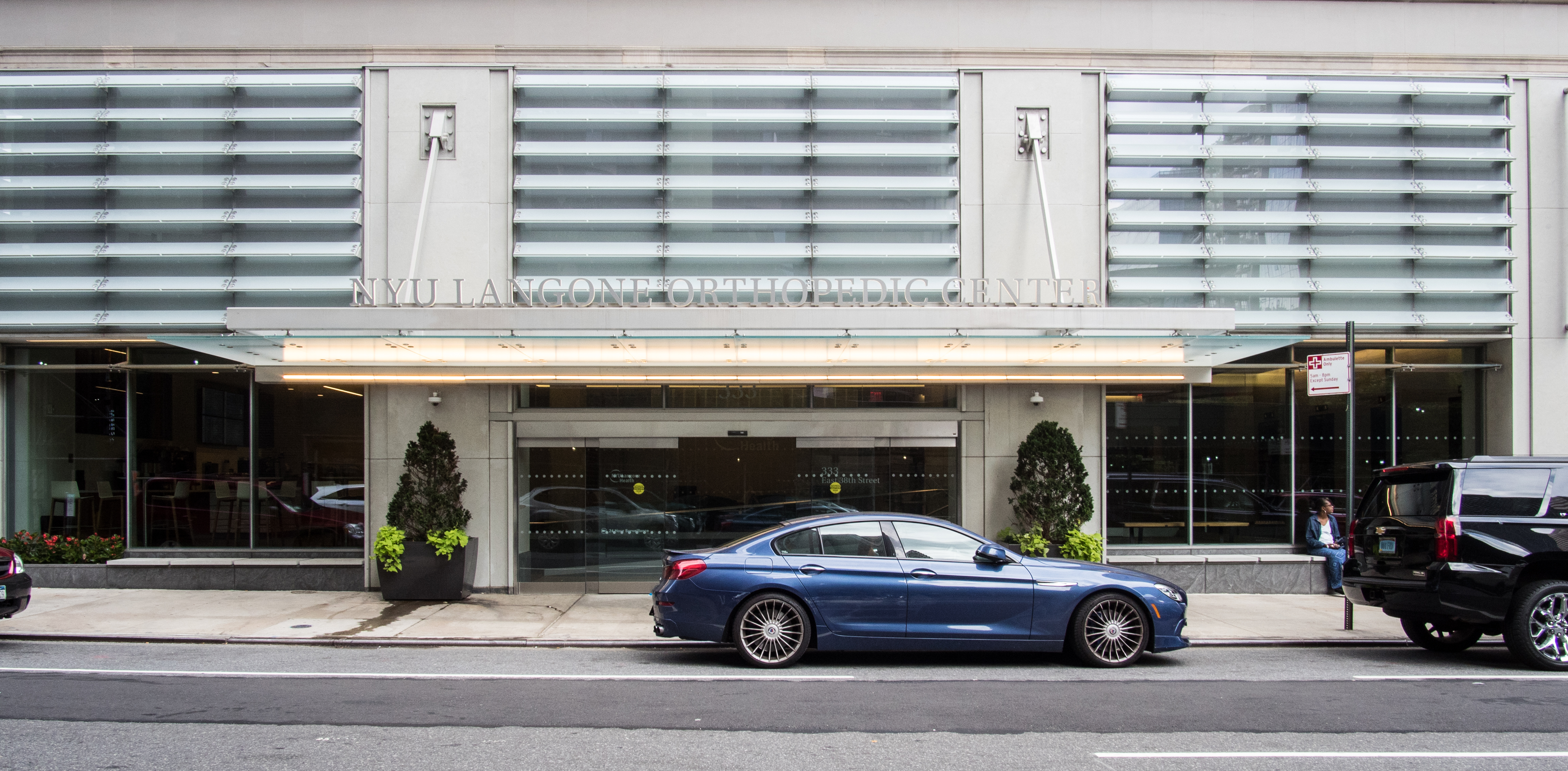
The building's former loading docks were converted into a new office lobby as part of the renovations in 1989

After the building became largely vacant in the mid-1980s, the net lease was acquired by S.L. Green and Philips International in 1988. The structure underwent a $12 million renovation by J.C.S. Design Associates and Lev Zetlin & Associates that began the following year. The building's loading docks on East 38th Street were converted to a new 3,000-square-foot (280 m^{2}), two-story lobby and the freight elevator that had been used for trucks was converted into four passenger elevators. Other improvements included the installation of new electrical, plumbing, heating and air conditioning systems, modernization of the two existing passenger elevators, replacement of windows and repairs to and cleaning of the facade.

The renovated building, which became known as 333 East 38th Street, was fully leased again in 1991. New tenants that moved into the building included New York Hospital and Newbridge Communications. NYU Medical Center became a tenant in the building in 2006, opening an ambulatory surgery center for orthopedic procedures in 2009 and a center for outpatient musculoskeletal services in 2012. SL Green sold its leasehold interest in the building to NYU Langone Medical Center in 2014. The building currently houses NYU Langone Health's Orthopedic Center (formerly the Center for Musculoskeletal Care) and Outpatient Surgery Center.
