= Von Cramm Cooperative Hall =

Building in Ithaca, New York, United States

Von Cramm Hall
- Von Cramm Hall
- Von Cramm Hall on West campus in Winter, 2007

General information
- Architectural style: Tudor Revivalism
- Location: Ithaca, New York, 623 University Ave.
- Coordinates: 42.448943°N 76.491319°W
- Construction started: 1952
- Inaugurated: 1956
- Cost: $300,000
- Owner: Cornell University

Technical details
- Floor area: 11,010 sq ft

Design and construction
- Architects: Starrett & Van Vleck; Reginald E Marsh

Von Cramm Hall is a student operated house on the West Campus of Cornell University in Ithaca, New York State. The residence hall is currently occupied by Redbud Cooperative. The house was founded in 1956 by Thomas Byron Gilchrist (Cornell class of 1906) from the American assets of Elizabeth von Elverfeldt (née Notman) to form a memorial house at the university in memory of her son Friedrich Sigismund von Cramm. Cramm was a lieutenant in the 16th Panzer Division of the Wehrmacht who was killed by a Soviet grenade near Mariupol, Ukraine on October 6, 1941. As she had no heirs, von Elverfeldt placed her American assets to Gilchrist and his son in trust, to be used for educational purposes.

First occupied in September 1957, Von Cramm housed approximately 30 undergraduate upperclassmen chosen by Cornell's Dean of Men and the Director of Financial Aid. From that time onward new residents were chosen by house members themselves. Two members were compensated for their services: the Steward, in charge of menus and food purchases, and the House Manager (overall management of the building). Members shared house upkeep and food preparation duties. During the 1970s the house became a self-governing co-operative open also to women.

== See also ==
- List of condominiums and housing cooperatives in New York
