= Heinz 57 Center =

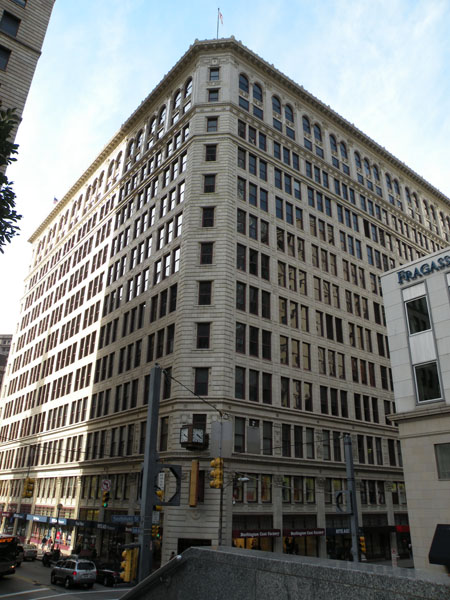
- The Heinz 57 Center, located at the corner of Sixth and Smithfield Avenues in Pittsburgh, Pennsylvania

General information
- Status: Completed
- Type: Office
- Location: 339 6th Avenue, Pittsburgh, Pennsylvania
- Coordinates: 40.44183°N 79.99798°W
- Construction started: 1913
- Completed: 1914
- Opening: 1914
- Owner: McKnight Realty Partners
- Operator: McKnight Realty Partners

Height
- Roof: 190 ft (58 m)
- Top floor: 177 ft (54 m)

Technical details
- Floor count: 13
- Floor area: 790,000 ft^{2} (73,393 m^{2})
- Lifts/elevators: 8

Design and construction
- Architect: Starrett & Van Vleck

Pittsburgh Landmark – PHLF
- Designated: 1982

The Heinz 57 Center is an office building in Pittsburgh, Pennsylvania at the corner of Sixth and Smithfield Avenues. The building has approximately 790,000 square feet (73,000 m^{2}), standing 13 stories (190 feet (58 m)) tall.

It was built in 1914 for the Kaufmann & Baer Co. department store. From 1925 to 1986 the building housed a Gimbels department store. Sitting largely vacant for 15 years, the building was remodeled into office space, serving as H.J. Heinz Co. North American Headquarters from 2002 to 2013.

The building was designated as historical landmark by the Pittsburgh History & Landmarks Foundation in 1982.

== History ==
Kaufmanns Department Store was run by the four Kaufmann brothers: Jacob, Isaac, Morris and Henry. In 1913, Morris Kaufmann and his son Edgar bought their other family members' interests and incorporated Kaufmann's. Isaac, Ludwig and Nathan Kaufmann partnered with Morris and Julius Baer to start a new department store, Kaufmann & Baer Co.. They built the 13 story, 700,000 square foot building at the corner of Sixth and Smithfield in downtown Pittsburgh. The store opened on March 18, 1914, advertising that there was "no connection with any other store". On December 2, 1925, Gimbel Brothers purchased Kaufmann & Baer Co., with the store name updated to Gimbels on January 3, 1928.

Included in the purchase was WCAE, the in store radio station, one of the five original Pittsburgh stations, first broadcasting on May 4, 1922. WCAE was Gimbels third radio station, after WIP in Philadelphia and WGBS in New York City.

Saks Fifth Avenue opened its seventh branch location in September 1949 within the Gimbels Pittsburgh Store. Saks occupied 20,000 square feet (1,900 m^{2}) on the sixth floor for 30 years until moving one block down Smithfield street to its own four-story building formerly occupied by W.T. Grant on August 22, 1977.

Gimbels closed on September 13, 1986, after doing business on Smithfield Street for 61 years.

Richard Penzer purchased the building in 1992 for $2.75 million, although it had an assessed value of $14 million at the time. Penzer was able to lease the first two levels of the old store to retailers Burlington Coat Factory, Barnes & Noble Booksellers and Eckerd Drug, but the top 9 floors, 450,000 ft^{2} (41,806 m^{2}) remained vacant.

Penzer had purchased 12 Pittsburgh buildings in the early 1990s, and during that time gained two orthodox rabbinical business partners, Israel Chait and Walter Friedman. By 1997, Penzer was in negotiations to sell the building to the Glimcher Realty Trust for $17 million. The sale of the building to Glimcher fell apart when Penzer alleged Mr. Chait, his former religious adviser, brainwashed him into sharing his property ownership with Mr. Chait and RZMF, draining millions from his real estate fortune.

McKnight Realty Partners purchased the building for $15 million in 1999. At this time the building had been largely vacant for nearly 15 years. The entire building underwent a $25 million remodel, converting into class-A office space. The revisions included adding an 8-story atrium to bring light to dark interior floors, each over an acre in size.

In 2001 H.J. Heinz Co. leased floors 7 though 14, totaling 310,000 ft^{2} (28,800 m^{2}) of the newly remodeled building, in order to relocate their North American headquarters. As part of the lease agreement, the building was renamed the Heinz 57 Center.

In 2013, H.J. Heinz Co. announced it would lay off 600 employees across its operations in the U.S. and Canada, including 350 in Pittsburgh, departing its office space in the Heinz 57 Center. Heinz had several office locations in Pittsburgh at the time, choosing to consolidate their remaining office workers into a single building at PPG Place. In 2014, UPMC agreed to sublease the majority of the space vacated by Heinz. UPMC moved 550 employees from One Chatham Center into the Heinz 57 Center. UPMC's departure from One Chatham Center left the space nearly vacant, driving the property into foreclosure.

In December 2025, the building's owner, McKnight Realty, was reported to be facing default on the building, after UPMC vacated the 40% of the building they occupied, and the Universirty of Pittsburgh and accounting firm BDO USA let their leases expire. The building was reported to be unsuited to residential conversion, due to the enormous size of each floor, with limited access to natural light.

In October 2026, McKnight Realty's lenders sought to foreclose on the building, which had dropped from 95% to only 18% occupancy.
