= Charles D. McIver School =

Historic school building in North Carolina, United States

- Former Charles D. McIver School
- U.S. National Register of Historic Places
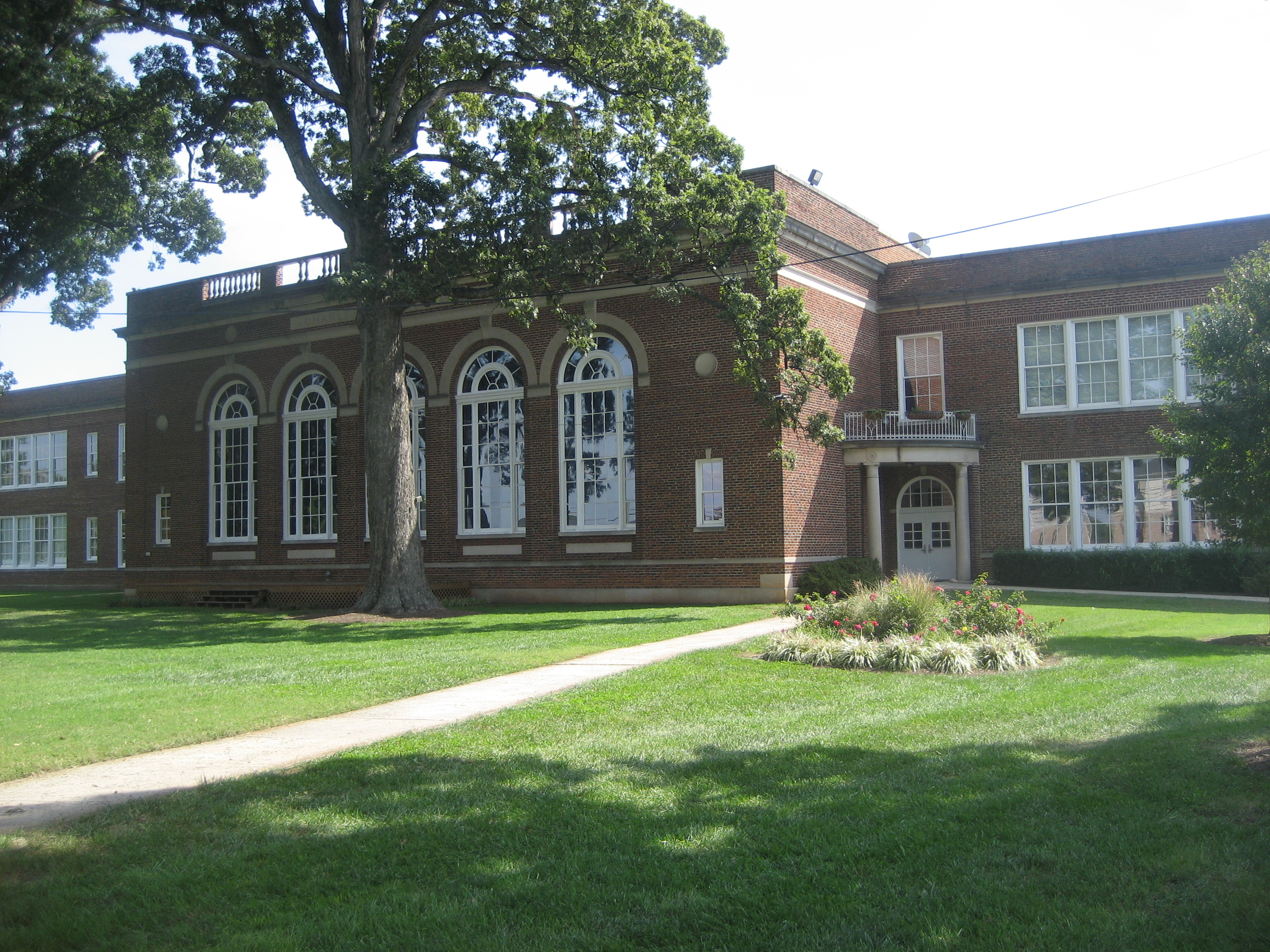
- The building in September 2012

- Location within North Carolina Location within the United States
- Location: 643 W. Gate City Blvd., Greensboro, North Carolina
- Coordinates: 36°3′47″N 79°48′4″W
- Area: 6.5 acres (2.6 ha)
- Built: 1923
- Architect: Starrett & Van Vleck
- Architectural style: Classical Revival
- MPS: Greensboro MPS
- NRHP reference No.: 92000177
- Added to NRHP: April 3, 1992

The former Charles D. McIver School is a historic school building located in Greensboro, Guilford County, North Carolina. It designed by architects Starrett & van Vleck in Classical Revival style. It was built in 1923, and is a long, symmetrical, two-story building faced with dark, wire-cut bricks. It features a central projecting pavilion that contains the school auditorium. The building was last used as an elementary school in the 1970s. It was used as a school for special needs children until the early 2000s. It was named for Charles Duncan McIver (1860–1906), founder and first president of the institution now known as The University of North Carolina at Greensboro.

It was listed on the National Register of Historic Places in 1992.
