= Foxburg Country Club =

Historic golf course in Foxburg, Pennsylvania

- Interactive map of Foxburg Country Club

Club information
- Location: Foxburg, Pennsylvania
- Established: 1887
- Type: Public
- Total holes: 9
- Website: Foxburg Country Club
- Designed by: Joseph Mickle Fox
- Foxburg Country Club and Golf Course
- U.S. National Register of Historic Places
- Pennsylvania state historical marker
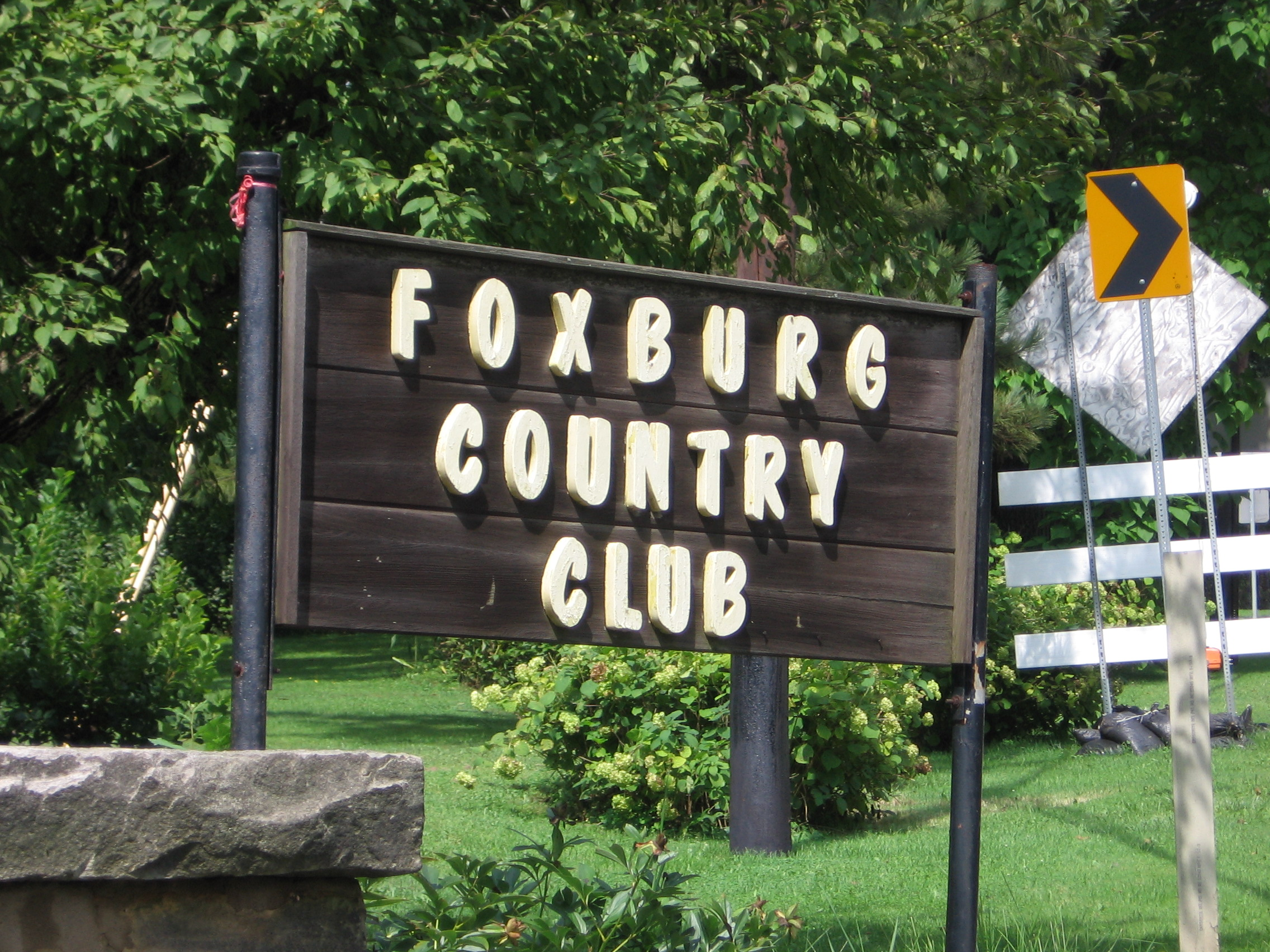

- Location within Pennsylvania Location within the United States
- Location: 369 Harvey Rd., Foxburg, Pennsylvania
- Coordinates: 41°09′00″N 79°40′45″W
- Area: 61 acres (24.7 ha)
- Built: 1887
- Architect: Starrett, Goldwin; Vleck, Van
- Architectural style: Bungalow/craftsman
- NRHP reference No.: 07000076

Significant dates
- Added to NRHP: February 21, 2007
- Designated PHMC: June 01, 1955

Foxburg Country Club, established in 1887, is the oldest golf course in continuous use in the United States. It is located in Foxburg, Clarion County, Pennsylvania, United States of America, approximately 55 miles (89 km) north of Pittsburgh on a hill rising about 300 feet above the Allegheny River. The course was listed in 2007 as Foxburg Country Club and Golf Course on the National Register of Historic Places. The clubhouse contains the American Golf Hall of Fame.

== History ==
The course was built by Joseph Mickle Fox. Fox was introduced to golf in 1884 while traveling in Great Britain to play in cricket matches, as a member of the Merion Cricket Club, also known as "The Gentlemen of Philadelphia." After participating in a cricket match in Edinburgh, Scotland, Fox visited St. Andrews to see the game of golf being played. Tom Morris Sr., the old bearded pro at St. Andrews took a liking to Fox and taught him the fundamentals of the game, sold him equipment and gutta percha balls to bring back to the United States. Fox was so intrigued by golf, that upon his arrival back to his summer estate in Clarion County, he made an eight-hole course on the nearby Fox Estate.

In 1887, due to local enthusiasm for golf, the club decided to build a more spacious golf course and Fox provided the land rent free, for what was to become Foxburg Country Club. The club was established and the golf course was expanded to nine holes in 1888. Historic buildings and objects at the club are the 1912 seasonal home adapted for use as a clubhouse in 1942, a stone well house built about 1890, and nine golf-related stone troughs. The troughs held sand and water that were combined by the golfers into small mounds that were used in place of tees. They were in use until about 1930.

The clubhouse was originally designed by the architecture firm of Starrett & van Vleck. It is a three-story Rustic Adirondack style building, with a broad verandah.

Many golfers who have played at Foxburg have stated that it is an easy course, but also challenging due to the amount of trees and brush.

Foxburg Country Club is a throwback and considered a "must play" by true lovers of the game of golf if passing through on Interstate 80 in Pennsylvania. The course is approximately five minutes south of the Interstate.

== American Golf Hall of Fame ==
The Foxburg Country Club is home to the American Golf Hall of Fame. This museum houses an extensive collection of extremely old and valuable golf clubs and artifacts from many different eras (prior to 1900) of the game. The museum is free and located on the top floor of the Foxburg Clubhouse.
