= St. Catherine of Siena Church (New York City) =

Roman Catholic church in New York

Coordinates: 40°45′54.27″N 73°57′25.64″W

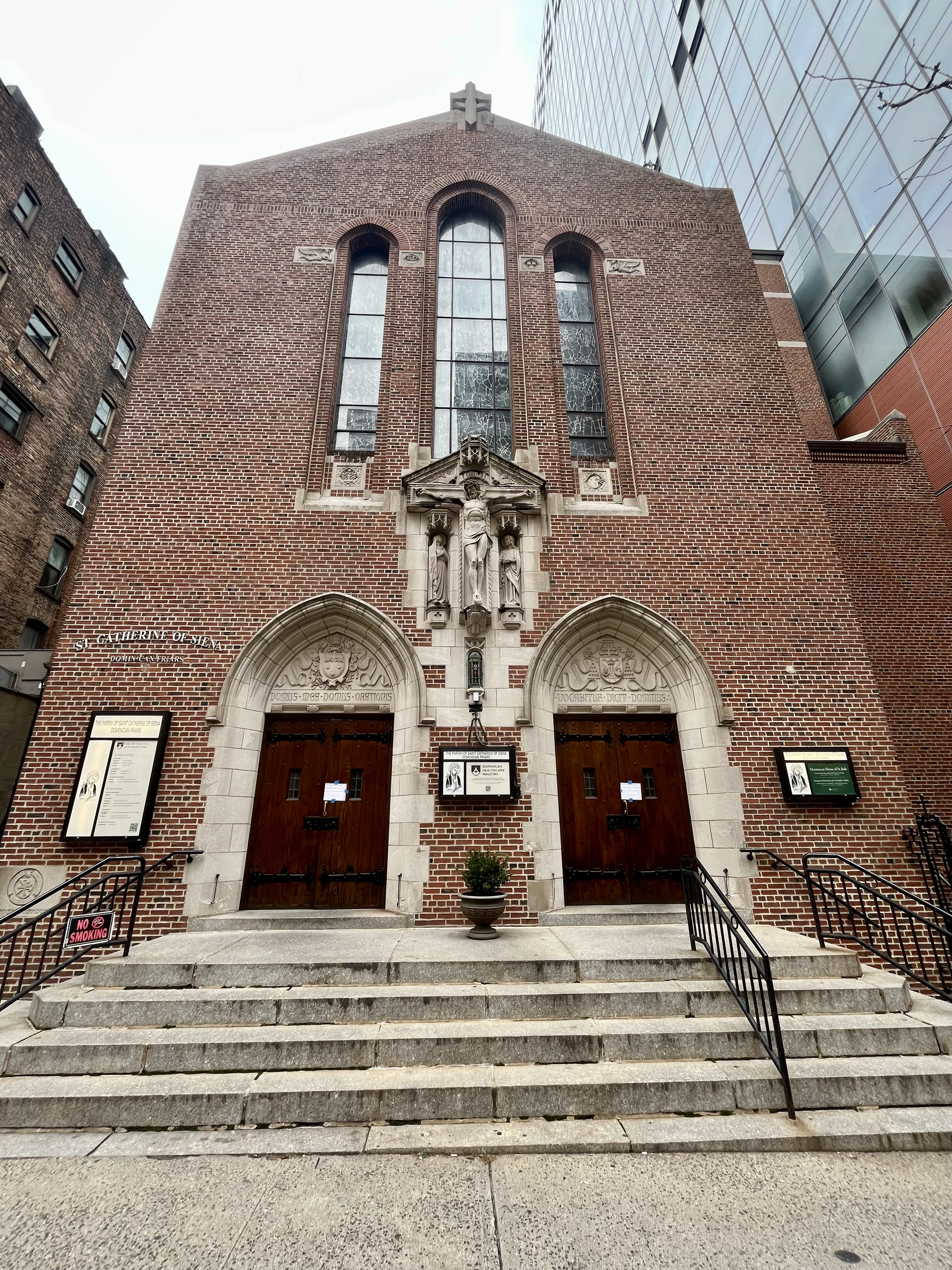
- The church in 2023
- Interactive map of the St. Catherine of Siena Church area

General information
- Location: New York City, United States of America
- Completed: 1957 (convent)
- Cost: $100,000 (1957 convent)
- Client: Roman Catholic Archdiocese of New York

Design and construction
- Architect: Starrett & Van Vleck of 267 Fifth Avenue (for the 1957 convent)

Website
- Parish of St. Vincent Ferrer and St. Catherine of Siena, Manhattan

The Church of St. Catherine of Siena is a Roman Catholic parish church in the Roman Catholic Archdiocese of New York, located at 411 East 68th Street, Manhattan, New York City. The parish was developed from that of St. Vincent Ferrer in 1896. It is staffed by the Dominican Fathers.

The church built a two-story convent and penthouse at 416 East 69th Street, built 1957 to designs by Starrett & Van Vleck of 267 Fifth Avenue for $100,000 ($1,150,000 in current dollar terms).

On May 8, 2015, the Archdiocese of New York announced the merger of parishes between St Vincent Ferrer and St. Catherine of Siena Church. Both churches remain open.
