= Robert F. Wagner Houses =

Public housing development in Manhattan, New York

- NYCHA property
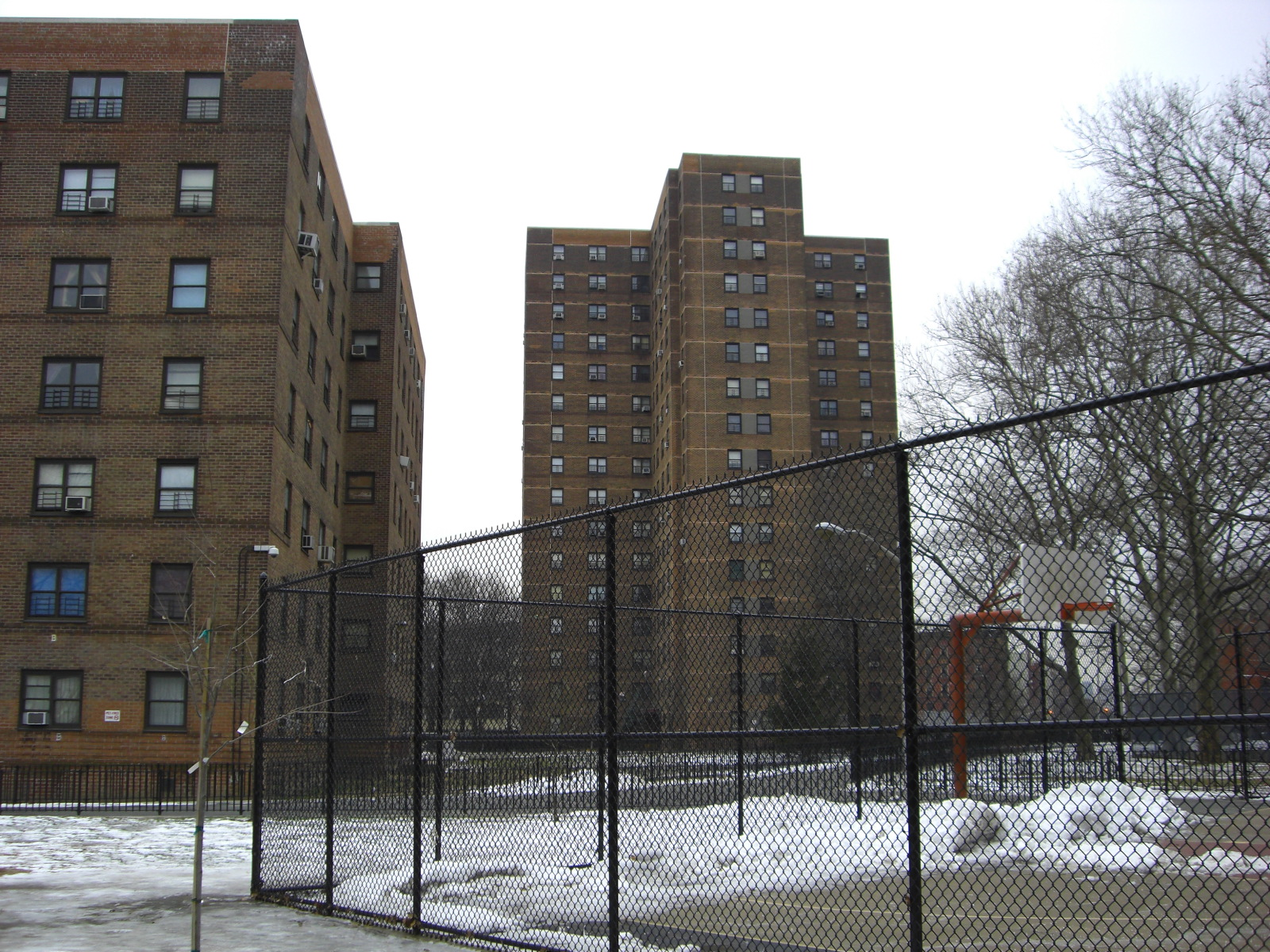
- Robert F. Wagner Houses in 2009
- Location in New York City
- Coordinates: 40.800260°N 73.932300°W
- Country: United States
- State: New York
- City: New York City
- Borough: Manhattan

Area
  - Total: 0.042 sq mi (0.11 km^{2})

Population
  - Total: 5,021
  - Density: 120,000/sq mi (46,000/km^{2})
- ZIP codes: 10035
- Area codes: 212, 332, 646, and 917
- Website: my.nycha.info/DevPortal/

Senator Robert F. Wagner Houses, also known as Triborough Houses, is a public housing development in the East Harlem neighborhood of Manhattan, in New York City and is administered by the New York City Housing Authority. It is located east of Second Avenue in the northeast corner of Manhattan, consists of fourteen 16-story buildings and eight 7-story buildings, a total of 22 buildings. It has 5,290 residents who live in 2,162 apartments. The complex occupies 26.91 acres (10.89 ha). It cost $30,926,000 to construct.

== Development ==
Demolition of existing buildings on the site began in 1954 and eliminated many stores, businesses, and residents. The development was completed on May 31, 1958, and was named after Robert F. Wagner, who served four terms as senator of New York State and sponsor of the 1937 Housing Act. Its 7- and 16-story buildings are in in-line slab and X-slab formations, covering 12.9% of the site.

The first family to move into the Wagner Houses, on August 3, 1956, moved from a cold-water flat on East 106th Street, which was also demolished to build Franklin Plaza Apartments.

== See also ==
- List of New York City Housing Authority properties
- Popular Residents - Robert Paul Champagne
