= Whitehall Building =

Mixed-use building in Manhattan, New York

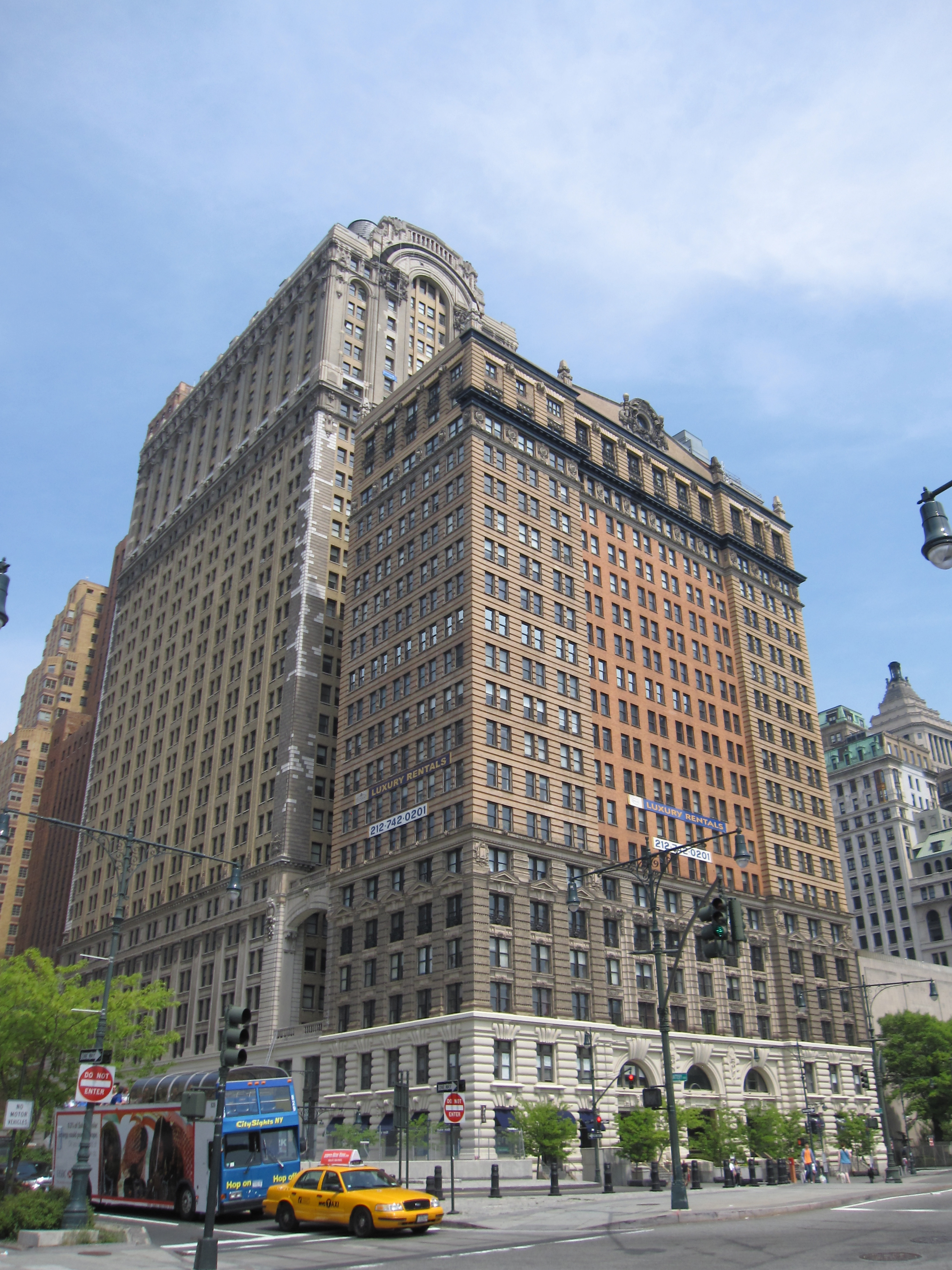
- The original Whitehall Building (front), with its larger annex in the back
- Alternative names: 17 Battery Place; Lesser Whitehall (original building); Greater Whitehall (annex)

General information
- Type: Residential and office
- Location: 17 Battery Place; Financial District, Manhattan, New York
- Coordinates: 40°42′20″N 74°0′58″W
- Construction started: 1902 (original building); 1908 (annex)
- Completed: 1904 (original building); 1910 (annex)
- Opening: 1904

Height
- Top floor: 259 ft (79 m) (original building); 424 ft (129 m) (annex)

Technical details
- Floor count: 20 (original building); 31 (annex)

Design and construction
- Architects: Henry J. Hardenbergh (original building); Clinton & Russell (annex)
- Structural engineer: James Hollis Wells (annex)
- Main contractor: George A. Fuller Company

New York City Landmark
- Designated: October 17, 2000
- Reference no.: 2056

The Whitehall Building is a three-section residential and office building next to Battery Park in Lower Manhattan, New York City, near the southern tip of Manhattan Island. The original 20-story structure on Battery Place, between West Street and Washington Street, was designed by Henry Janeway Hardenbergh, while the 31-story Whitehall Building Annex on West Street was designed by Clinton and Russell. The original building and annex are both at 17 Battery Place. Another 22-story addition at 2 Washington Street, an International Style building located north of the original building and east of the annex, was designed by Morris Lapidus.

The original Whitehall Building and its annex has a Renaissance Revival style facade, and the two original structures' articulations consist of three horizontal sections similar to the components of a column—namely a base, shaft, and capital. Since the building is located on landfill along the Hudson River, its foundation incorporates a non-standard design.

The Whitehall Building is named after the nearby estate of New Amsterdam colonial governor Peter Stuyvesant. The original building was built as a speculative development in 1902–1904 for Robert A. and William H. Chesebrough, a real estate company. The annex was built in 1908–1910, and 2 Washington Street was built in 1972. In 2000, the New York City Landmarks Preservation Commission (LPC) designated the Whitehall Building as an official city landmark. The upper floors of the original building and annex were converted to apartments, while the lower floors remain in use as an office building.

== Site ==
The Whitehall Building is located near the southernmost point on Manhattan Island, closer to its western shore. The original building faces West Street to the west, Battery Place to the south, and Washington Street and the Brooklyn–Battery Tunnel portal to the east. It is adjacent to the Downtown Athletic Club building at 20 West Street to the north, which occupies the entire width of the block between West and Washington Streets. The annex on West Street and the 2 Washington Street addition each occupy half the width of the block between Washington and West Streets.

The building stands on filled land along the shore of the North River (an archaic name for the southernmost portion of the Hudson River). The surrounding neighborhood, the Financial District, was the first part of Manhattan to be developed as part of New Netherland and later New York City; its population growth led city officials to add land on Manhattan's shore by filling and land reclamation in the 18th and 19th centuries. As the North River shoreline was deeper and had a denser concentration of buildings than the East River shoreline on the east side of Manhattan Island, the land under the Whitehall Building was not filled until 1835, when debris from the Great Fire of New York was dumped there. These filling operations also led to the expansion of Battery Park, directly to the south. The site of the Whitehall Building was first occupied by small landowners who built houses in the area. The surrounding neighborhood became a financial and shipping hub during the late 19th century, and as the Financial District became more densely developed, the residential landowners moved uptown and their former lands were replaced with larger commercial buildings.

== Architecture ==
=== Original structure and annex ===
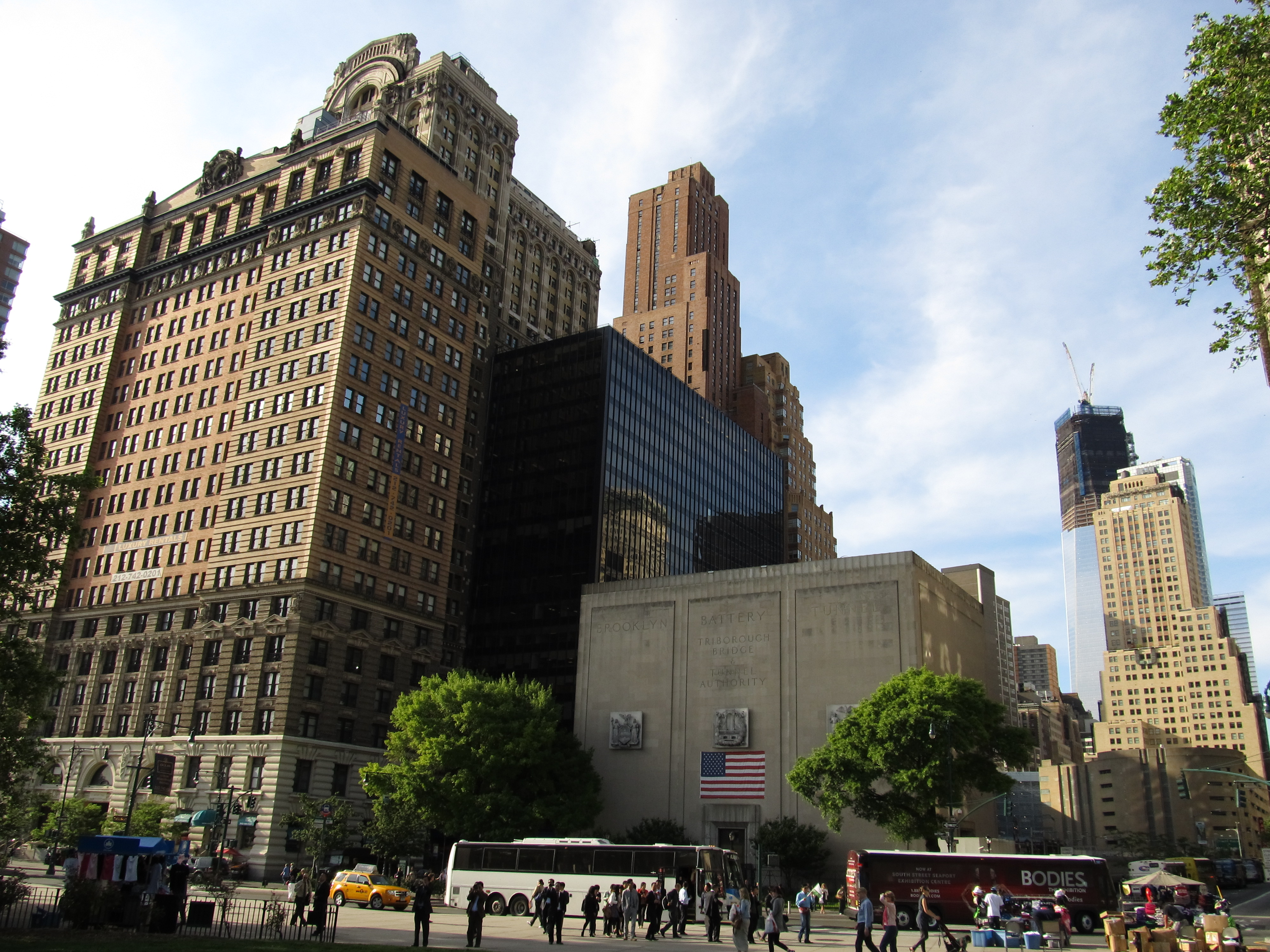
Viewed from the Battery, to the left of the Brooklyn-Battery Tunnel ventilation building. The Downtown Athletic Club and 21 West Street are located behind the annex and 2 Washington Street (center left); One World Trade Center is under construction at right.

The original structure (also called the Lesser Whitehall or just the Whitehall Building) is a 20-story building on Battery Place. It was designed by Henry J. Hardenbergh, and according to Moses King, had 400 offices. The Whitehall Building's annex, also known as the Whitehall Extension or Greater Whitehall, is a 31-story skyscraper on West Street, north of the original Whitehall Building's western section. Designed by Clinton and Russell, it was the largest office building in New York City at the time of its completion. Both structures contain Renaissance Revival facades with colorful granite, brick, limestone, and architectural terracotta cladding, which in turn was inspired from the sites' highly visible location at the southern tip of Manhattan Island.

==== Form ====
The original building measures 150.6 feet (45.9 m) along Battery Place to the south. Due to the irregular shape of the lot, its western boundary along West Street is 69.1 feet (21.1 m) long and the eastern boundary on Washington Street is 63.4 feet (19.3 m) long.

The annex occupies a lot measuring 181 feet (55 m) along West Street, with a depth ranging from 63 to 69 feet (19 to 21 m). A two-bay-wide, two-story section facing West Street, as well as an elevator structure toward the center of the block between West and Washington Streets, connect the annex and original building. The elevator structure is the same height as the annex and consists of a convex section with cast-iron cladding, as well as a straight section with brick facade. The original structure and annex form an "L" shape and appear as two slabs, as viewed from Battery Park.

==== Facade ====
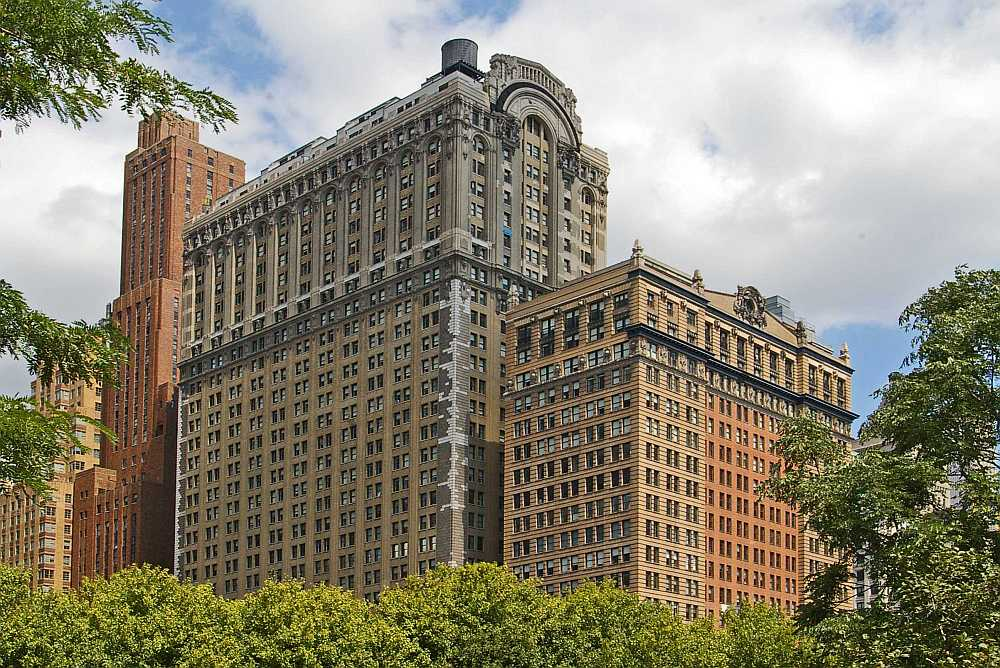
Original building (right) and annex (left) viewed from the southwest

The facade of the original structure is designed into three horizontal layers: a base, tower, and crown. The original structure is composed of 12 vertical bays facing Battery Place; the center six bays are slightly recessed, and at ground level, contain three double-width, double-height entrance arches with ornate lintels. The base, which is composed of the basement, first floor, and mezzanine, have a facade of rusticated blocks of limestone. The second through fifth floors contain a facade of tan brick and stone, and a cornice above the fifth floor. The fourth-floor windows on Battery Place are elaborately ornamented, with cast-iron railings in the six center windows on Battery Place, and pediments above the remaining windows. On the sixth through sixteenth floors, the center six bays on Battery Place are faced with red brick and mortar, while the outer bays and the side facades have a facade of yellow brick with pink strips. The terracotta-faced eighteenth floor acts as a transitional story. Above the 20th story is a large cornice with brick piers that emulate the base's articulation, and above the Battery Place facade, a triangular brick pediment with an ornate depiction of an oculus.

The West Street facade of the original building is five bays wide and contains similar materials and symbolic elements as on the Battery Place facade. The first floor and mezzanine are faced with rusticated limestone, the second through fifth floors contain a facade of tan brick, and the upper floors are faced with yellow brick. The center bay on West Street contains four steps, leading to a window that replaced a former entrance. The metal cornices atop the building on West and Washington Streets have been removed. The northern facade is faced with plain brick. The original building's Washington Street facade is four bays wide, but otherwise is the same as the West Street facade in design.

The annex has its principal facade on West Street, which is eleven bays wide. The annex has a base of limestone that rises to the sixth story, and as with the original building, the basement, first floor and mezzanine consist of rusticated blocks of limestone. (Note: The New York City Landmarks Preservation Commission says that the rusticated section is three stories tall, and thus the limestone facade continues through the eighth story. However, this considers the basement and mezzanine as full floors.) The seventh through 23rd floors each contain two rectangular window openings per bay, and have a brick facade; there are cornices at the top and bottom of the 23rd floor. On West Street, the 24th through 29th floor windows are slightly recessed behind an arched arcade that wraps around the rest of the annex, and contain decorated terracotta detailing; the 29th floor windows are rounded and semicircular. The 30th floor contains elaborate terracotta detailing, with two windows per bay, and a 31st floor contains penthouses recessed behind a balustrade. At the top of the tower that rises above the annex, there is a south-facing rounded pediment and a water tower.

The northern elevation of the annex contains a three-bay-wide largely plain yellow-brick facade. The piers at each corner are rusticated. The outer bays contain a single window on each floor. The 24th through 29th floor windows are arranged as in an arcade, the 30th-story windows are round headed, and the 31st-story windows are square-headed. The eastern facade of the annex has similar ornamentation as on West Street.

==== Features ====
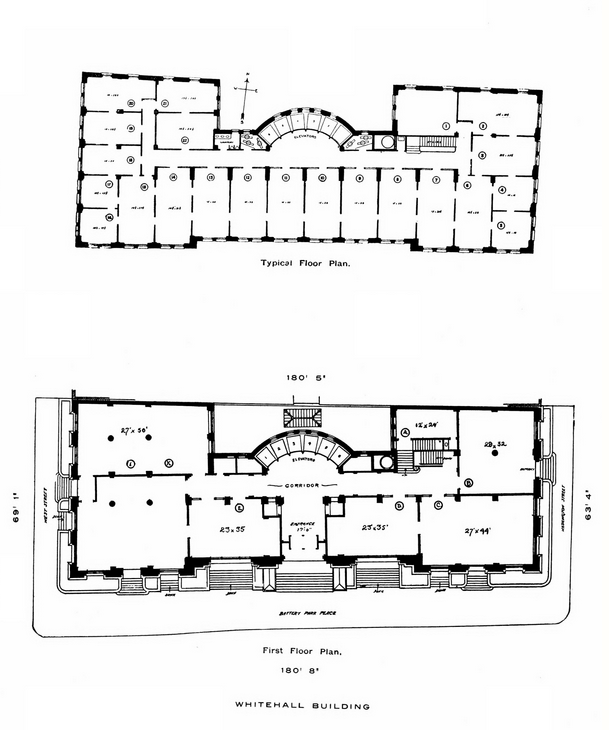
Illustration of a typical floor plan (top) and ground floor plan (bottom)

The original building measures 259 feet (79 m) to its rooftop while the annex measures 416 feet (127 m) to its rooftop. Underlying the site, a layer of hardpan was present between 27 and 36 feet (8.2 and 11.0 m) below the ground, while rock was 33 to 65 feet (10 to 20 m) below the ground. The foundation of the original building was dug by 48 pneumatic caissons sunk to 45 feet (14 m) below the curb. Of these, 32 were cylindrical while the other 16 were rectangular. The original building's caissons support 53 steel columns in the original building's superstructure. Air shafts and air locks for the workers were inside the caissons.

The basement of the annex, which contains the building's boiler room and electrical equipment, was dug by timber and steel caissons. The annex basement is enclosed in a concrete cofferdam with 7-foot-thick (2.1 m) walls, made of caissons joined from end to end. While the basement floor is 10 feet (3.0 m) below sea level and consists of a 2-foot-thick (0.61 m) concrete layer, the walls of the cofferdam descend 33 to 40 feet (10 to 12 m) below the floor of the basement. Other portions of the foundation included I-beam grillages and distributing girders. The annex superstructure contains 71 main columns, 53 of which sit atop forty-five granite foundation piers. The other 18 main columns are inside the boiler room walls and are carried down directly to the hardpan. As with the original building, the annex's caissons contained air shafts and air locks.

The annex incorporates 30 elevators, 14,000 short tons (13,000 t) of structural steel, 8,400,000 short tons (7,600,000 t) of brick, and 45,000 imperial barrels (1,900,000 U.S. gal) of cement. The superstructure of the annex contains a steel frame with floors made of inverted concrete arches; tile partitions; copper windows; and steel stairs with marble treads.

=== 2 Washington Street ===
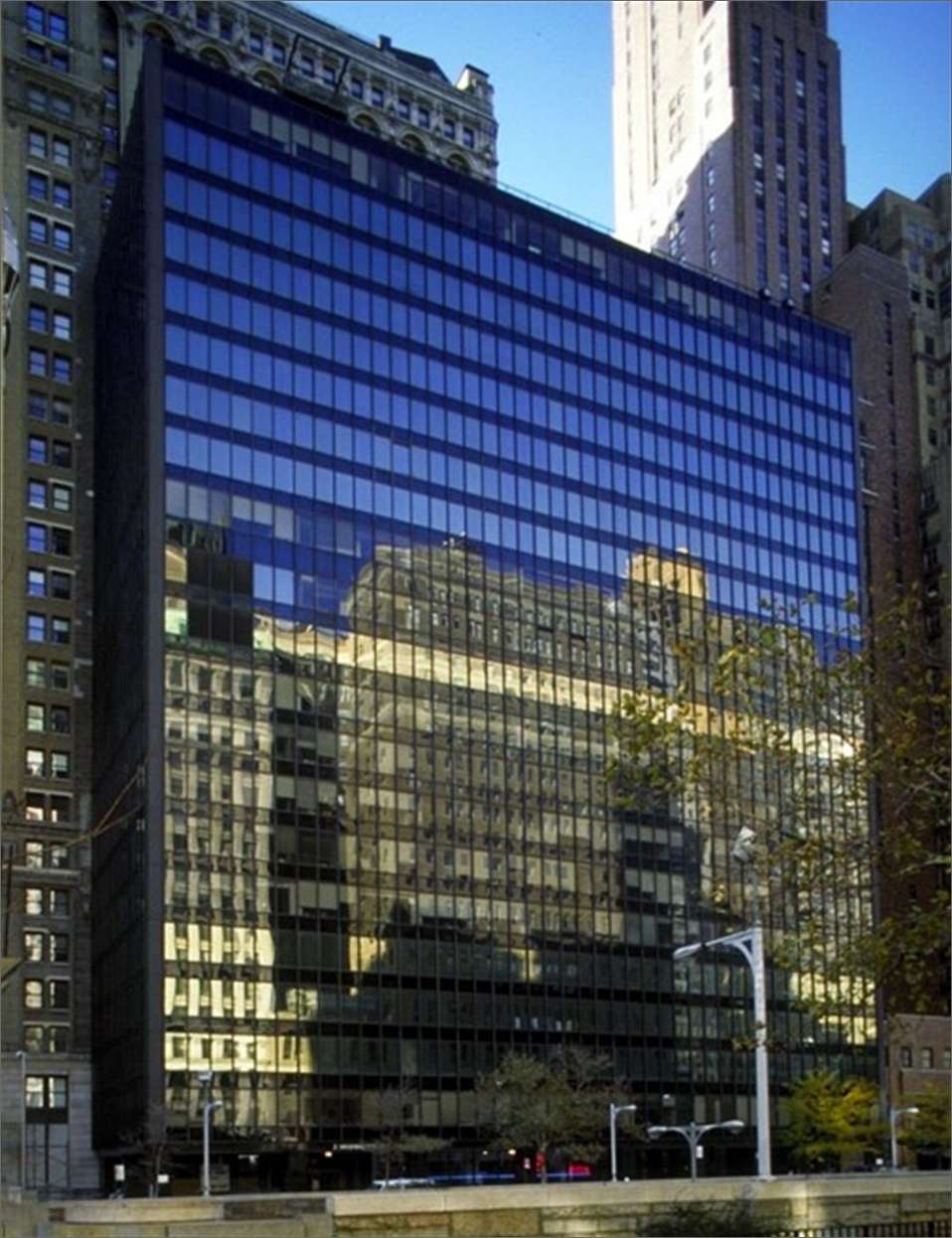
Exterior of 2 Washington Street

2 Washington Street (also known as 17 Battery Place North or One Western Union International Plaza), was built in 1972 (Note: The alteration form was submitted in 1969.) and measures 271 feet (83 m) with 22 floors. The structure was designed by Morris Lapidus in the International Style, and unlike the other two sections, does not have official landmark protection. The facade is a simple glass curtain wall. On the eastern side of 2 Washington Street is a privately owned public space.

== History ==
=== Development of original structure ===
The Real Estate Record and Guide reported in 1901 that a land plot measuring 150 feet (46 m) on the north side of Battery Place, 22 feet (6.7 m) on West Street, and 33.10 feet (10.09 m) on Washington Street, had been sold. The buyer was Century Realty Company, another company owned by Chesebrough, which intended to resell the land to Battery Place Realty Company. The Battery Place Realty Company, which would develop what would become the Whitehall Building, was led by Robert Chesebrough, a chemist known for discovering Vaseline, along with his son William A. Chesebrough. At the time, building sites near Broadway, two blocks east of the Whitehall Building, were considered to be optimal for development, especially after the 1907 completion of the U.S. Custom House at Broadway and Battery Place. The Whitehall Building's location across from Battery Park ensured a direct view of the New York Harbor, since the park faced the harbor on its other end. The Chesebroughs were responsible for developing other Lower Manhattan structures as well.

The original building was constructed from 1902 as a speculative office building designed by Henry Hardenbergh. Because the streets surrounding the site of the building were not heavily trafficked at the time, construction offices were placed directly on the street. The old cellars of the previous structures on the site were excavated, and three 8-hour shifts of 100 men each were employed to drive the caissons. The initial structure opened in May 1903, and was completed in 1904. (Note: The New York City Landmarks Preservation Commission says that the 1904 date of completion is based on New York City Department of Buildings records, but contemporary sources show that the building opened in 1903.) The structure was named for Peter Stuyvesant's 17th-century home, "White Hall", which had been located nearby. Rents per square foot at the Whitehall Building were generally lower than those on Broadway, and so many tenants started to move into the building.

=== Development of annex ===
The Battery Place Realty Company had expanded its land holdings by 1904, so that they owned 150 feet of the block frontage on West and Washington Streets. The company purchased the addresses 4–7 West Street and 6–7 Washington Street, (Note: Address numbers on the east side of West Street run consecutively because the west side of the street was formerly on the waterfront. In the area's standard address numbering system, odd- and even-numbered addresses are on opposite sides of the street.) thus controlling a lot of over 14,000 square feet (1,300 m^{2}) though the firm publicly stated that it had "no intention of erecting any addition to the building". By 1906, all land acquisition had been completed. One trade journal described the building's development as part of "the most remarkable movement in the construction of office buildings which has ever occurred in the history of the world".

The Battery Place Realty Company started soliciting construction bids for an annex to the Whitehall Building in 1908. Clinton and Russell had been hired to plan the structure, which was initially set to be 36 stories. The following year, the United States Realty and Improvement Company bought the Battery Place Realty Company's stock and took over the construction process. By then, United States Realty had 307 feet (94 m) on West and Washington Street, but intended to build the annex as a 31-story structure on West Street, a smaller 16-story section on Washington Street, and the 36-story tower in the center, rising 447 feet (136 m). At the time, the annex was to be the largest single office building in the city. The combined lot area for the two buildings was 51,515 square feet (4,786 m^{2}), which was 20,000 square feet (1,900 m^{2}) larger than the lot area of the City Investing Building, the next-largest office building in New York City. Seventeen structures were demolished to make way for the annex.

Work on the foundations of the annex commenced in December 1909. Twelve derricks were placed on the site to install the beams and caissons. Work for the annex was driven by two 12-hour shifts of 450 men each, while the foundations were dug by three 8-hour shifts of 100 sandhogs each. The foundations of the annex were dug by the O'Rourke Engineering Construction Company, which extracted 13,000 cubic feet (370 m^{3}) of earth through open excavation and 6,000 cubic feet (170 m^{3}) through caissons. The superstructure was erected under the supervision of general contractor George A. Fuller Company. The steel frame was then erected from May 1910 at a rate of four stories per week, with trucks delivering the steel beams from offsite, and gangs of workers completing the concrete floors as the steel structure was being completed. The annex was completed by late 1910, excluding the section facing Washington Street, which was not constructed during that time. The annex was cited as being "one of the largest commercial structures in the world" and the largest individual office structure in Manhattan. At the time it was cited as having 11,000,000 cubic feet (310,000 m^{3}) or 12,000,000 cubic feet (340,000 m^{3}) of space.

=== Office use ===
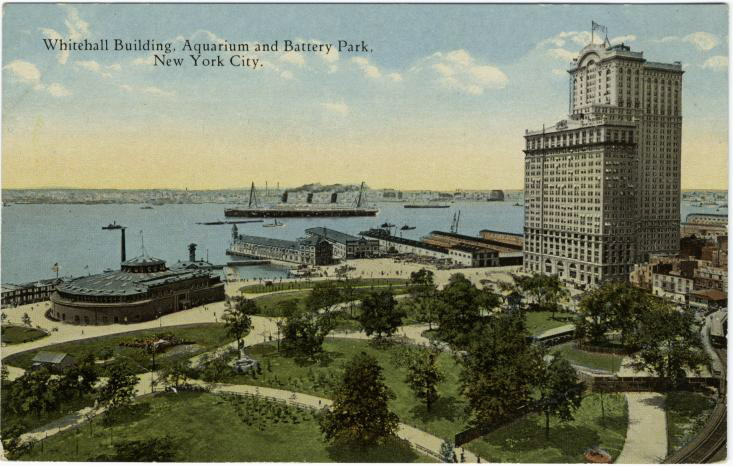
1910s postcard

By 1911, rents at the original Whitehall Building and its annex averaged $1.70 per square foot ($18.3/m^{2}), cheaper than comparable structures. The building complex was described in the Real Estate Record and Guide as "one of the best investments of its kind in the city". The Whitehall Club, a lunch club for Lower Manhattan merchants and businesspersons, was housed on the top four floors of the Whitehall Building's annex. This lunch club became the premier maritime club in New York City during that era and hosted famous shipping figures.

One office tenant in the mid-20th century was the Moran Towing Company, operator of a fleet of tugboats. In the days before radio dispatching, a man high in the building would watch with a telescope for incoming ships, and then use a six-foot megaphone to shout instructions to the Moran tugboats docked at the Battery. Other long term tenants included the Gulf Refining Company, Tide Water Oil Company, United States Weather Bureau, Internal Revenue Service, and the Penn Coal and Coke Company. The consulate of Germany in New York City and the Communist Daily Worker newspaper also had offices at 17 Battery Place, which were damaged in a 1940 bombing perpetrated by opponents of Nazi Germany. The German consulate moved out the year after the bombing.

The United States Realty and Improvement Company owned the building until 1932. Afterward, the Whitehall Improvement Corporation owned the building until 1950 when it was sold to the New York Life Insurance Company. By then, the building was known as the "Whitehall-Sheraton Building". On the Washington Street side of the block, east of the annex and north of the original building, the twenty-two-story 2 Washington Street was erected in 1971. The newest addition was originally called One Western Union International Plaza (or "One WUI Plaza") because Western Union's spin-off international record carrier division, Western Union International, was headquartered there. It was also called 17 Battery Place North. In 1974, a fire at 2 Washington Street forced the evacuation of 5,000 office workers across the entire Whitehall complex; The New York Times reported that the computers of one tenant, securities firm Hayden, Stone & Co., continued to handle transactions automatically during the evacuation.

By the 1970s, the Moran Towing Company had moved to the World Trade Center, while the McAllister Brothers, a rival firm, had occupied the Whitehall Building's 15th floor. Another tenant at the Whitehall Building complex was Tidewater Oil. The membership of the Whitehall Club atop the annex declined significantly from 1,000 in the 1960s to 600 in 1990, and the club had closed by the end of the 1990s. The building was sold in September 1995 for $23 million. The buyers, a group led by the banker Jeffrey A. Citron, Downtown Acquisitions Partners, hired Jones Lang Wootton the next year to resell the building at an asking price of $60 million.

=== Hotel and residential conversion ===
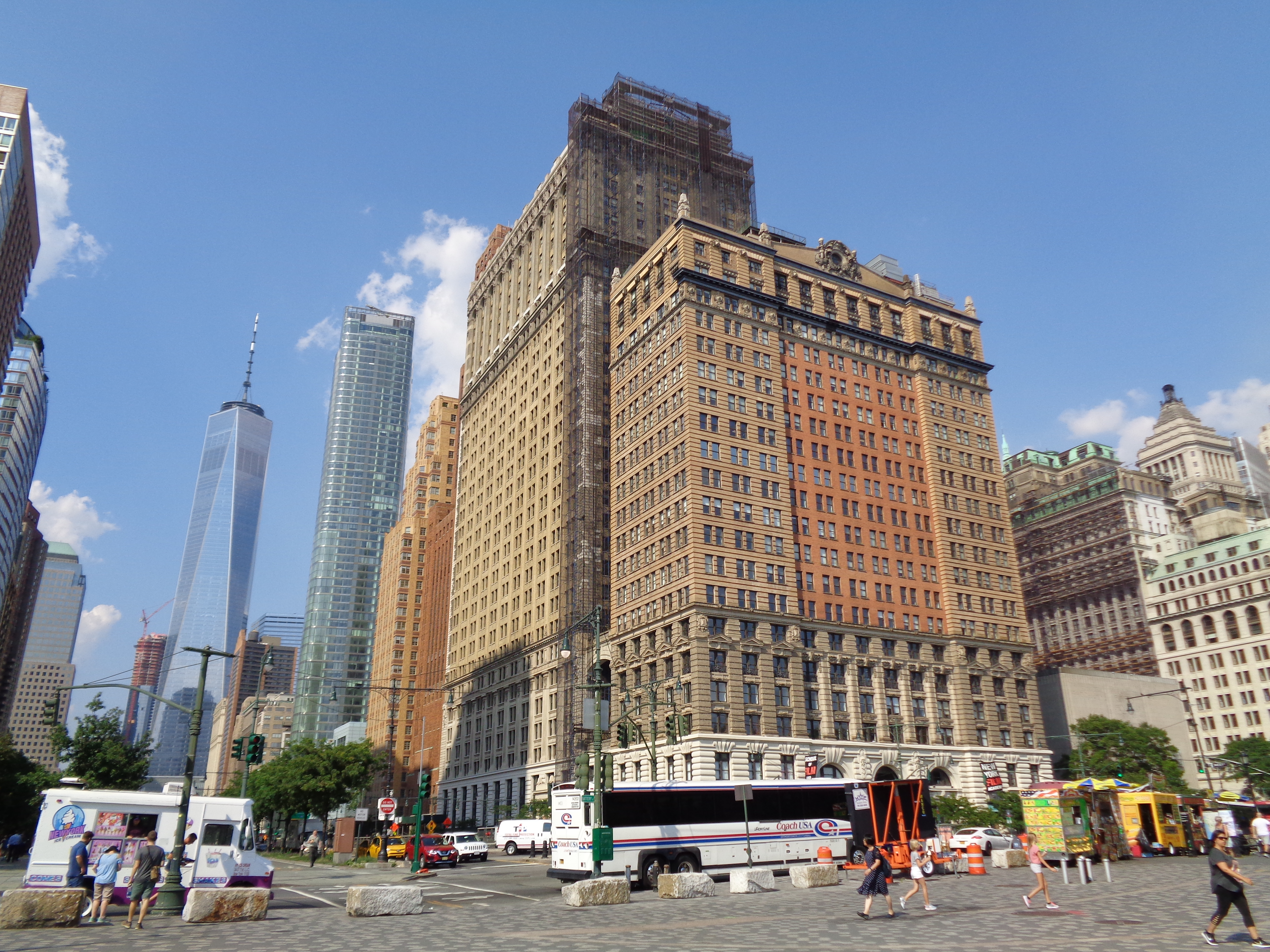
The original building and annex seen in 2017

In 1997, the developer Allen I. Gross bought the original building, annex, and 2 Washington Street for $70 million and proposed converting the original structure and annex's upper stories into a hotel and condominiums, retaining commercial uses on lower floors. The first through 13th floors were to be purchased by SL Green Realty and operated as office space; the 14th through 23rd floors would be a Ritz-Carlton hotel, and the annex above the 24th floor would contain residences. At the time, 30% of the 1,200,000 square feet (110,000 m^{2}) of usable space was unoccupied. The conversion would have been completed in 1999 and cost $100 million. Had the hotel been completed, it would have had 325 rooms targeted at tourists and business clients, but the hotel proposal failed in 1998.

SL Green ultimately bought part of the structures in 1997, paying $58 million for 800,000 square feet (74,000 m^{2}) of space. The acquisition included the second through 13th floors in the original building and annex, as well as the entirety of 2 Washington Street. In 1999 the Moinian Group paid $42 million for the basement, ground floor, and the 14th through topmost floors of the older two buildings. The group intended to convert the upper floors to 500 rental apartments with their main address at One West Street. The ground floor was to be used as a business center, while the residential structure would contain a parking lot, health club, and rooftop deck. The Whitehall Building and Annex were designated by the Landmarks Preservation Commission on October 17, 2000; the designation applies to the portion of Block 15, Lot 7501 on which they stand. SL Green sold the original building and its annex later that year to an affiliate of the Moinian Group. SL Green received $53 million from the sale, most of which it intended to use to pay for another building, 1370 Broadway.

The residential conversion was nearly completed in 2001, when developer Richard Bassuk arranged for Deutsche Bank to give Moinian a $208.5 million loan to finish the project. However, because of the September 11 attacks at the nearby World Trade Center, Bassuk estimated that occupancy at 17 Battery Place went from nearly 100% before the attacks to 10% afterward. SL Green sold 2 Washington Place to Moinian in 2003 for $70 million. By that year, 17 Battery Place was almost completely rented. To attract tenants after the September 11 attacks, Moinian used "clever tactics" such as furnished model apartments as well as large retailers at ground level. In 2005, the southernmost portion of West Street was reconstructed, including the portal over the Battery Park Underpass directly to the west. As part of the reconstruction project, a 9,600-square-foot (890 m^{2}) public plaza was erected outside the Whitehall Building, east of West Street.

Nyack College moved into 2 Washington Street in 2013, and the following year, the New York Film Academy moved to the first floor of 17 Battery Place. By 2019, the Moinian Group intended to convert 2 Washington Street into a residential structure with 345 units. The facade was renovated in 2024.

== Reception ==
When originally built, the Whitehall Building was described as having "resembled a big chimney" and that it was the single most prominent structure for vessels docking on the East or North (Hudson) rivers. Art critic Russell Sturgis said "Mr. Hardenbergh has shown, in his Whitehall Building, that simplicity is not incompatible with dignity, and that this dignity may have a decided quality of beauty", but that this form was not emulated by other buildings' designs. One New York Times article later described the Whitehall Building as being "an elegant orange-colored building with ornate gargoyles" next to the Brooklyn–Battery Tunnel's ventilation building, an "overgrown tombstone".

Architectural historians Sarah Landau and Carl W. Condit wrote that the original Whitehall Building and its annex complemented each other, even though the Whitehall Building's annex "is irregularly shaped and somewhat overwhelming in impact" compared to the older building. The annex was so much larger than the original Whitehall Building that the original structure was described as "suited as offices for little people only".

== See also ==
- List of New York City Designated Landmarks in Manhattan below 14th Street
