= Chesebrough Manufacturing Company =

Oil company

- Type: Subsidiary (1881–1911); Private (1911–1955)
- Industry: Petroleum
- Founded: 1859
- Founder: Robert Chesebrough
- Defunct: June 1955; 71 years ago
- Fate: Merged with Pond's in 1955 to form "Chesebrough-Pond's Inc.", then acquired by Unilever in 1986
- Successor: Chesebrough-Pond's Inc.
- Headquarters: 1984 Dandenong Rd, Clayton (Australasian division)
- Products: Petroleum jelly
- Brands: Vaseline
- Parent: Standard Oil (1881–1911)

Chesebrough Manufacturing Company (/ˈtʃiːzbroʊ/) was an oil company, founded in 1859, which produced petroleum jelly under the brand names Vaseline and Luxor. Robert Augustus Chesebrough, a chemist who started the company, was interested in marketing oil products for medicinal use. He produced the first petroleum jelly by refining rod wax, a paraffin-like substance that formed on oil drilling rigs, using heat and filtration. He named the substance Vaseline, from the German word for water (Wasser) and the Greek word for oil (olion). Vaseline was patented in the United States in 1872 and England in 1877.

Chesebrough today is part of the British consumer products company Unilever, which acquired Chesebrough and Pond's (the two of which merged in 1955) in 1986.

== History ==
In 1870, Robert Chesebrough began selling a product derived from petroleum residue, the "Vaseline Petroleum Jelly". Chesebrough's first manufacturing plant for vaseline was in Perth Amboy, New Jersey. In 1881, Chesebrough Manufacturing began operating under Standard Oil. With the breakup of Standard Oil in 1911, it regained independence. Additional production sites were built in Pittsburgh, Pennsylvania, and in 1924, London, England.

Executives and associates of Chesebrough Australasia in 1953. The tall man towards the middle of the group is then-Australasian general manager, Ralph Ward.

Chesebrough Manufacturing Company distributed its product throughout the United States and Britain during the early and mid-20th century. Its UK office was at 42 Holborn Viaduct. It was listed on the New York Stock Exchange and grouped with other oil-related stocks such as Standard Oil and its subsidiaries, and Continental Oil.

The company had a productive record of earnings and dividend disbursements, even after the onset of the Great Depression. Earnings increased from $8.36 per share in 1925 to $13.22 during 1929. As of December 31, 1940, the Chesebrough Manufacturing Company had total assets of $4,267,940 and liabilities of $603,643. In 1940, damage to its London plant from a World War II air raid totaled $50,000.

In 1952, construction began on the company's modern Australasian division plant in the Melbourne suburb of Clayton, which was established to distribute Chesebrough products within Oceania and to Asia. A celebratory cocktail party attended by executives was held at the complex in October 1953, shortly after operations began. The site served the company and its predecessors for several decades. The original face of Chesebrough in Australasia was Ralph Ward, an American-born businessman who later oversaw the firm worldwide.

Chesebrough and Pond's merged in June 1955 and, in 1987, Chesebrough-Ponds was acquired by the British consumer goods company Unilever. Unilever paid $3.1 billion USD for Chesebrough-Ponds ($72.50 per share), in an all-cash deal.
