= Melting =

Material phase change

Melting ice cubes illustrate the process of fusion.

Melting, or fusion, is a physical process that results in the phase transition of a substance from a solid to a liquid. This occurs when the internal energy of the solid increases, typically by the application of heat or pressure, which increases the substance's temperature to the melting point. At the melting point, the ordering of ions or molecules in the solid breaks down to a less ordered state, and the solid melts to become a liquid.

Substances in the molten state generally have reduced viscosity as the temperature increases. An exception to this principle is elemental sulfur, whose viscosity increases in the range of 130 °C to 190 °C due to polymerization.

Some organic compounds melt through mesophases, states of partial order between solid and liquid.

== First order phase transition ==
From a thermodynamics point of view, at the melting point the change in Gibbs free energy ∆G of the substances is zero, but there are non-zero changes in the enthalpy (H) and the entropy (S), known respectively as the enthalpy of fusion (or latent heat of fusion) and the entropy of fusion. Melting is therefore classified as a first-order phase transition. Melting occurs when the Gibbs free energy of the liquid becomes lower than the solid for that material. The temperature at which this occurs is dependent on the ambient pressure.

Low-temperature helium is the only known exception to the general rule. Helium-3 has a negative enthalpy of fusion at temperatures below 0.3 K. Helium-4 also has a very slightly negative enthalpy of fusion below 0.8 K. This means that, at appropriate constant pressures, heat must be removed from these substances in order to melt them.

== Criteria ==
Among the theoretical criteria for melting, the Lindemann and Born criteria are those most frequently used as a basis to analyse the melting conditions.

The Lindemann criterion states that melting occurs because of "vibrational instability", e.g. crystals melt; when the average amplitude of thermal vibrations of atoms is relatively high compared with interatomic distances, e.g. <δu^{2}>^{1/2} > δ_{L}R_{s}, where δu is the atomic displacement, the Lindemann parameter δ_{L} ≈ 0.20...0.25 and R_{s} is one-half of the inter-atomic distance. The "Lindemann melting criterion" is supported by experimental data both for crystalline materials and for glass-liquid transitions in amorphous materials.

The Born criterion is based on a rigidity catastrophe caused by the vanishing elastic shear modulus, i.e. when the crystal no longer has sufficient rigidity to mechanically withstand the load, it becomes liquid.

Another melting criterion is based on configuron percolation theory (CPT) and accounts for their mobility in materials. In crystals, configurons which are quasiparticles in form of broken chemical bonds, are delocalized and propagate freely through the periodic lattice, enabling collective condensation and emergence of latent heat for the phase change at the melting point T_{m}. In contrast to that structural disorder of glasses induces Anderson localization of configurons, suppressing condensation and producing a continuous, second-order-like glass transition at T_{g}. Both transitions from solid to melt phases arise from configuron percolation, but their order is determined by configuron mobility.

== Supercooling ==
Under a standard set of conditions, the melting point of a substance is a characteristic property. The melting point is often equal to the freezing point. However, under carefully created conditions, supercooling, or superheating past the melting or freezing point can occur. Water on a very clean glass surface will often supercool several degrees below the freezing point without freezing. Fine emulsions of pure water have been cooled to −38 °C without nucleation to form ice. Nucleation occurs due to fluctuations in the properties of the material. If the material is kept still there is often nothing (such as physical vibration) to trigger this change, and supercooling (or superheating) may occur. Thermodynamically, the supercooled liquid is in the metastable state with respect to the crystalline phase, and it is likely to crystallize suddenly.

== Glasses ==
Glasses are amorphous solids, which are usually fabricated when the molten material cools very rapidly to below its glass transition temperature, without sufficient time for a regular crystal lattice to form. Solids are characterised by a high degree of connectivity between their molecules, and fluids have lower connectivity of their structural blocks. Melting of a solid material can also be considered as a percolation via broken connections between particles e.g. connecting bonds. In this approach melting of an amorphous material occurs, when the broken bonds form a percolation cluster with T_{g} dependent on quasi-equilibrium thermodynamic parameters of bonds e.g. on enthalpy (H_{d}) and entropy (S_{d}) of formation of bonds in a given system at given conditions:

$$T_g = \frac{H_d}{S_d+ R \ln(\frac{1-f_c}{f_c})},$$

where f_{c} is the percolation threshold and R is the universal gas constant.

Although H_{d} and S_{d} are not true equilibrium thermodynamic parameters and can depend on the cooling rate of a melt, they can be found from available experimental data on viscosity of amorphous materials.

Even below its melting point, quasi-liquid films can be observed on crystalline surfaces. The thickness of the film is temperature-dependent. This effect is common for all crystalline materials. This pre-melting shows its effects in e.g. frost heave, the growth of snowflakes, and, taking grain boundary interfaces into account, maybe even in the movement of glaciers.

== Related concept ==
In ultrashort pulse physics, a so-called nonthermal melting may take place. It occurs not because of the increase of the atomic kinetic energy, but because of changes of the interatomic potential due to excitation of electrons. Since electrons are acting like a glue sticking atoms together, heating electrons by a femtosecond laser alters the properties of this "glue", which may break the bonds between the atoms and melt a material even without an increase of the atomic temperature.

In genetics, melting DNA means to separate the double-stranded DNA into two single strands by heating or the use of chemical agents, polymerase chain reaction.

== Table ==
Phase transitions of matter
To From	Solid	Liquid	Gas	Plasma
Solid		Melting	Sublimation	
Liquid	Freezing		Vaporization	
Gas	Deposition	Condensation		Ionization
Plasma			Recombination	

== See also ==
- List of chemical elements providing melting points
- Phase diagram
- Zone melting
