= Robert Chesebrough =

American chemist (1837–1933)

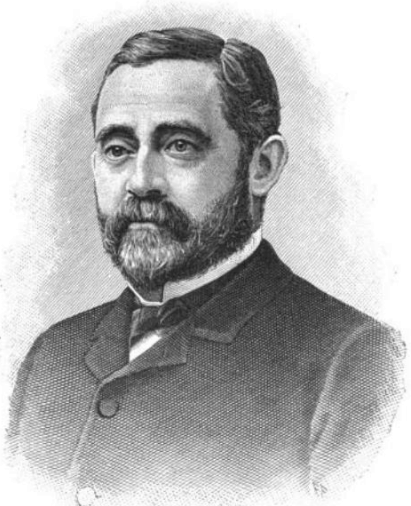
- Born: Robert Augustus Chesebrough; January 9, 1837; London, England
- Died: September 8, 1933 (aged 96); Spring Lake, New Jersey, U.S.
- Known for: Petroleum jelly
- Spouse: Margaret McCredy (m. 1864; died 1887)
- Children: 4

Signature
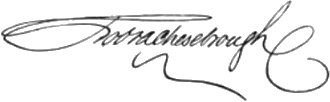

Robert Augustus Chesebrough (/ˈtʃiːzbroʊ/; January 9, 1837 – September 8, 1933) was an English-born American chemist who discovered petroleum jelly—which he marketed as Vaseline—and founder of the Chesebrough Manufacturing Company.

== Life and career ==
Born in London, England, to American parents on January 9, 1837, Chesebrough was raised in New York City. He married Margaret McCredy on April 28, 1864, and they had four children.

Chesebrough began his career as a chemist clarifying lamp oil from sperm oil, a waxy oil found in the heads of sperm whales. The development of coal oil and the discovery of petroleum in Titusville, Pennsylvania, rendered his job obsolete, so he traveled to Titusville to research what new materials might be created from the new fuel. As he was strolling around the oil field, he found out about something called rod wax, also known as petroleum jelly, a jellylike substance that was cleaned off of the pumping equipment often. Chesebrough was told it was a nuisance, except when someone had a cut or burn; they found that if it was rubbed on an injury, then it would lessen the pain and make the injury heal quicker. He then trade-named the jelly as Vaseline.

In 1875, he founded the Chesebrough Manufacturing Company, a leading manufacturer of personal-care products. Chesebrough patented the process of making petroleum jelly (U.S. patent 127,568) in 1872. By 1874, stores were selling over 1,400 jars of Vaseline a day.

Chesebrough's success stemmed from a firm belief in his product. Before he began selling petroleum jelly, he tested it on his own cuts and burns. Chesebrough was still unable to sell any to drug stores until he traveled around New York demonstrating his miracle product. In front of an audience, he would burn his skin with acid or an open flame, then spread the clear jelly on his injuries while demonstrating past injuries, healed, he claimed, by his miracle product.

Chesebrough opened his first factory in 1870. The first known reference to the name Vaseline is in his U.S. patent: "I, Robert Chesebrough, have invented a new and useful product from petroleum which I have named 'Vaseline…'" . The word is believed to come from German Wasser (water) + Ancient Greek: έλαιον (élaion, oil).

Chesebrough lived to be 96 years old and was such a believer in Vaseline that he claimed to have eaten "more than a teaspoon" of it every day. He died at his house in Spring Lake, New Jersey. There is an unsubstantiated claim that "[i]n his late fifties, ill with pleurisy, he made his nurse anoint him with the substance from head to toe—and promptly recovered." He is buried in Woodlawn Cemetery in the Bronx, New York City.

== See also ==
- Whitehall Building, a building developed by Chesebrough in New York City
