= Downtown Athletic Club =

Residential skyscraper in Manhattan, New York

Downtown Club
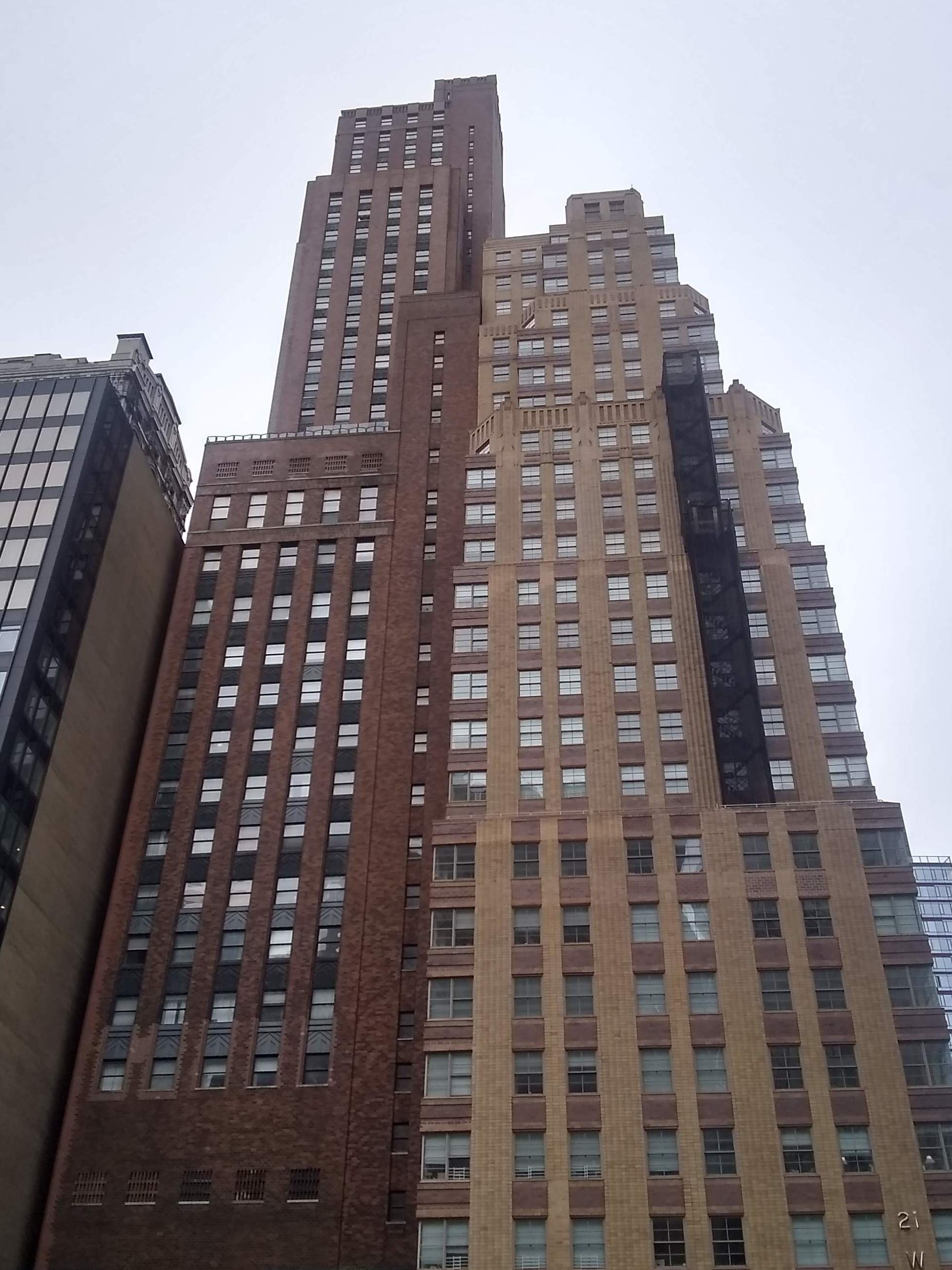
- The eastern facade of the Downtown Club (left) and 21 West Street (right)
- Interactive map of the Downtown Club area

General information
- Type: Residential
- Architectural style: Art Deco
- Location: 20 West Street, New York, NY 10004
- Coordinates: 40°42′22″N 74°00′56″W
- Construction started: 1929
- Completed: 1930

Height
- Roof: 518 ft (158 m)
- Top floor: 515 ft (157 m)

Technical details
- Floor count: 35 (+4 attic) (Note: There are 35 full stories. Including attics, the building has 39 stories.)

Design and construction
- Architect: Starrett & van Vleck

New York City Landmark
- Designated: November 14, 2000
- Reference no.: 2075

The Downtown Athletic Club, also known as the Downtown Club, was a private social and athletic club that operated from 1926 to 2002 at 20 West Street, within the Financial District of Lower Manhattan in New York City. The Downtown Athletic Club was known for issuing the Heisman Trophy, an annual award for outstanding college football players that was named after John Heisman, the club's first athletic director.

The Downtown Athletic Club was founded in 1926 as an all-male club. The club bought land for their building near the Hudson River in 1927 and completed the structure in 1930. The building was sold off in 1936 following the club's bankruptcy, but was reacquired in 1950. The club started admitting female members in 1977, and after facing further financial troubles in the late 1990s, sold off part of its building. After the September 11 attacks on the nearby World Trade Center, blockades in the neighborhood rendered the clubhouse largely inaccessible; the club filed for bankruptcy and then shut down.

The 35-story Downtown Athletic Club building was designed in the Art Deco style by Starrett & van Vleck, who also designed the adjacent 21 West Street at the same time. The building housed all of the club's athletic activities, as well as living and dining spaces. Its architectural features include several setbacks to allow light to reach the street, as mandated by the 1916 Zoning Resolution, in addition to the design of the brickwork and the different architectural concessions made for the building's various facilities. 20 West Street was designated by the New York City Landmarks Preservation Commission as an official city landmark in 2000. After the club closed, the building was converted to the Downtown Club, a residential building with condominiums.

== Site ==
The Downtown Club building is located near the southernmost point on Manhattan Island, closer to its western shore. It faces West Street to the west, and Washington Street and the Brooklyn–Battery Tunnel portal to the east. The building officially carries the address 20 West Street, but also includes all address numbers on 18-20 West Street, inclusive, (Note: On West Street, this includes the address 19 West Street. Address numbers on the east side of West Street run consecutively because the west side of the street was formerly on the waterfront. In the area's standard address numbering system, odd- and even-numbered addresses are on opposite sides of the street.) and even address numbers on 28-32 Washington Street, inclusive. It is bounded by the Whitehall Building (also known as 17 Battery Place) to the south and 21 West Street to the north; both are also New York City designated landmarks, though the landmark designation only applies to 17 Battery Place's western and southern sections.

The building stands on filled land along the shore of the North River (an archaic name for the southernmost portion of the Hudson River). The surrounding neighborhood, the Financial District, was the first part of Manhattan to be developed as part of New Netherland and later New York City; its population growth led city officials to add land on Manhattan's shore by filling and land reclamation in the 18th and 19th centuries. As the North River shoreline was deeper and had a denser concentration of buildings than the East River shoreline on the east side of Manhattan Island, the land under the Downtown Club building was not filled until 1835, when debris from the Great Fire of New York was dumped there. As a result of the land filling, neighboring buildings such as 21 West Street were constructed without a basement. The site of the Downtown Athletic Club was first occupied by small landowners who built houses in the area. The surrounding neighborhood became a financial and shipping hub during the late 19th century, and as the Financial District became more densely developed, the residential landowners moved uptown and their former lands were replaced with larger commercial buildings.

== Architecture ==
The Downtown Club building was designed in the Art Deco style by Starrett & van Vleck, who simultaneously designed the adjacent 21 West Street in the same style. The two buildings were constructed for different purposes and accordingly have different appearances; namely, the facade of the Downtown Athletic Club is darker than that of 21 West Street. Starrett & van Vleck had already designed several New York City department stores, including the Lord & Taylor, Bloomingdale's, and Saks Fifth Avenue buildings. Including attics, the Downtown Club has 39 above-ground stories and is 518 feet (158 m) tall.

As originally designed, the Downtown Club building included different facilities and living spaces on each of its floors: the lower floors were mostly reserved for athletic facilities and the upper floors contained bedrooms. The design of an athletic club in a skyscraper was characterized by architect Rem Koolhaas as an "instrument of the Culture of Congestion".

=== Form ===
The Downtown Club building extends the entire block between West and Washington Streets. Though the Downtown Club building was designed first, Starrett & van Vleck examined the relationship of the Downtown Club's and 21 West Street's designs on the surrounding neighborhood and on each other. The facade of the Downtown Club building is of slightly darker brick, with more recessed setbacks on both West and Washington Streets, compared to 21 West Street. The Downtown Club is the tallest building on the block.

The building contains setbacks as mandated by the 1916 Zoning Resolution; the locations of the setbacks are based on the original uses of the interiors. The bottom stories were the largest, occupying nearly the entire land lot. The 4th through 19th stories, which included the athletic facilities, were set back on the western and eastern facades. Another setback existed above the 26th story, which contained the club's private hotel rooms.

=== Facade ===
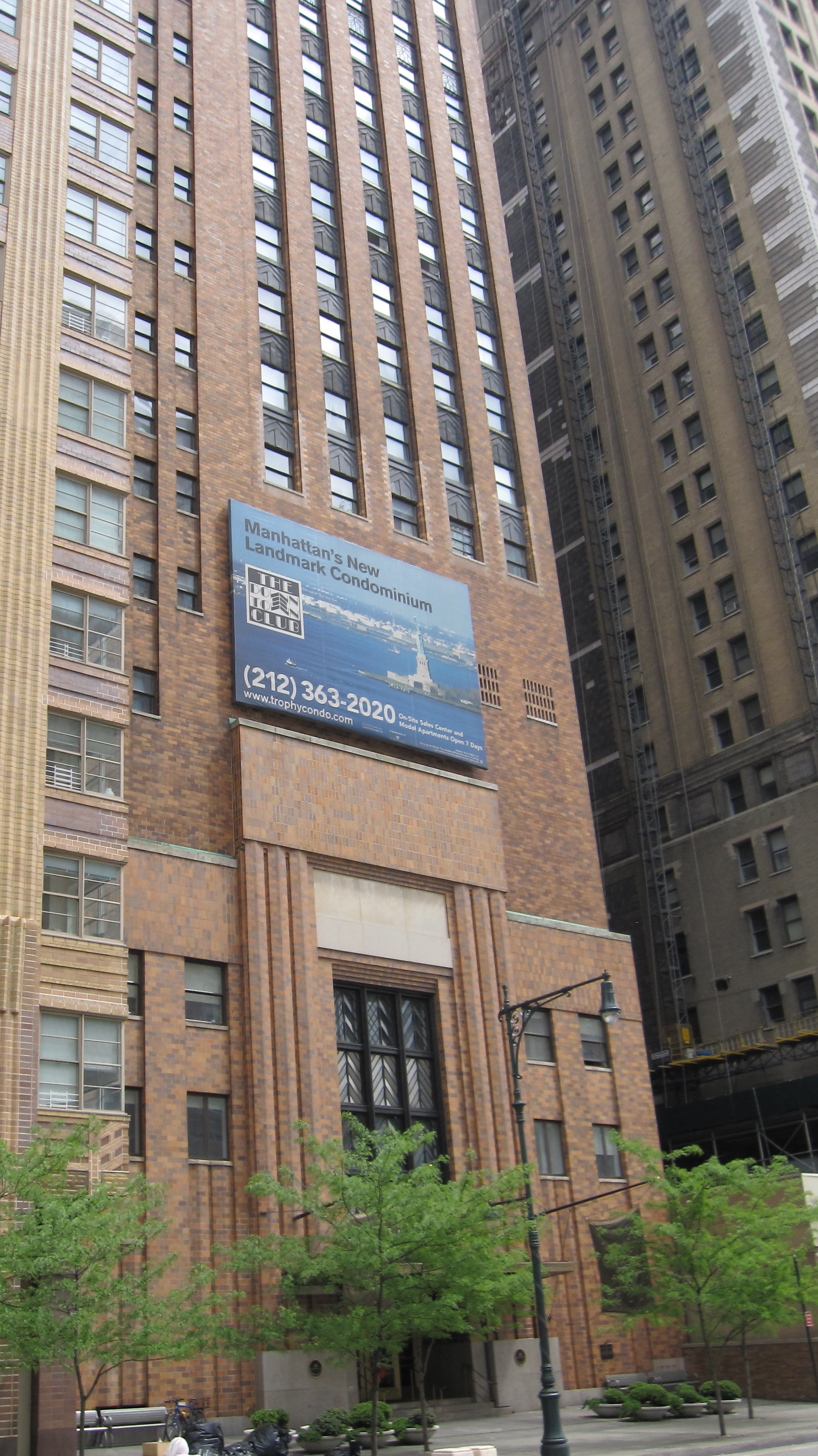
Base of the building as seen from West Street; 21 West St. and Whitehall Building are to the left and right respectively

The facade of the Downtown Athletic Club building consists of mottled, patterned orange brick that is used to provide texture. The color contrasts with the multicolored brick designs of the adjacent 21 West Street. Sections of the facade are punctuated with vertical brick segments, and the brick is especially prominent around the windows, the corbels around the entrance, and the parapets on the roof. Other features include window sills and parapet caps made of stone, as well as spandrels made of zinc and lead in a chevron layout. The facade design also reflects the building's interior use. The hotel stories above the 20th floor had smaller windows, while the athletic facility floors between the 4th and 19th stories had larger windows. Some of the facilities, such as the squash courts, did not require windows and so are placed in windowless sections of the building.

==== Base ====
The lowest four stories comprise the base. The facades of the base on both West Street and Washington Street are divided into three vertical bays. The main entrance is on West Street, where three brick columns rise to either side of the central entrance bay. A set of metal doors is located at the center of the entrance bay, above which is a metal marquee, followed by a large window opening with four rows of three chevron-patterned glass panels. Atop that large window are a stone panel and a large brick panel, with rows of corbelled bricks in between. On the second and third floors of the West Street facade, there are two windows on either side of the large entrance bay.

The Washington Street entrance is less elaborate: it contains a set of metal doors topped by a metal marquee, but the window above is only one story high with three chevron-patterned panels. The center entrance bay protrudes from the facade only slightly. On the first floor, there are two doors to the north (or right) of the central doorway and two windows to the south (left). On the second floor, there is one window on either side of the doorway, with an additional vent grate to the left. The third floor contains seven windows.

==== Tower ====
On West Street to the west, the building is set back above the fourth story. The north (left) bay contains a separate window arrangement with one window on the 4th floor and two small windows on each of the 5th through 15th floors. The facades of the center and south (right) bays are combined, and contain recessed windows, with varying placements and designs of the spandrels above the windows on each floor. On the center and south bays, each story from the 7th through 15th stories contains five windows; the 5th story contains five window grates; and the 4th and 6th stories contain no windows at all. Above the 16th story, there are four windows per floor. There are further setbacks above the 16th floor of the center and south bays, and above the 17th floor of the north bay, with smaller setback portions on the south side of the 18th story and the north side of the 20th story. Another setback on the 26th story contains a limestone-capped parapet.

On Washington Street to the east, the building is set back above the fourth story. As with the West Street facade, the north (right) bay contains a separate window arrangement and the facades of the center and south (left) bays are combined. The center and south bays have an identical window arrangement to their counterparts on West Street, being five windows wide, but the north bay on Washington Street has only one window per floor on each of the 5th through 15th floors. The 16th floor contains only ventilation grates; the building has another setback at the 17th floor, with a glass balcony rail. Above the 16th story, there are four windows per floor; there is another setback at the 29th story with a stone parapet.

The northern facade is largely blocked by 21 West Street, while the southern facade has a similar window arrangement to the western and eastern facades. On all sides, the 35th story has a brick band, chevrons above each of the window bays, and a parapet with limestone caps. There is a three-story mechanical tower above the northern part of the roof, with decorative brickwork and three recessed brick panels on each of its four facades.

=== Interior ===
The lower floors were devoted mostly to recreation. The ground floor contained the lobby and offices, and the lobby hosted exhibitions such as a Staten Island Museum show on ferries in New York City and displays of the Heisman Trophy. The third floor contained billiard tables and cardrooms, while the fifth floor contained bowling alleys. The fourth and sixth floors contained racquetball, handball, tennis, and squash courts; the seventh floor, a miniature golf course; and the eighth floor, a gym. The twelfth floor had a swimming pool, which was described as the world's highest aquatic facility when it was built. The 10th floor had medical rooms, and the 13th through 19th floors contained dining rooms and lounges. There were also kitchens on the 13th through 15th floors, a balcony with greenhouse on the 15th floor, and maintenance facilities on the 16th through 19th floors.

On the 20th through 32nd floors were 143 private hotel rooms. The rooms had been occupied by guests such as boxer Muhammad Ali, baseball players Joe DiMaggio and Mickey Mantle, comedian Bob Hope, and Heisman Trophy winners. The water tank and mechanical equipment occupied the top three stories. There was also a staircase along the building's northeastern corner, as well as six passenger elevators and one freight elevator.

Interior designers Barnet Phillips and Duncan Hunter were responsible for the interior design. Design elements included "unusual lighting" as well as Meso-American style murals and geometrically patterned flooring. The style was highly praised as being among the era's "finest high style" and was equated with the ornate designs of steamship rooms. Christopher Gray of The New York Times said that "the scale and sophistication of the work made it one of the most developed Art Deco interiors in New York."

== History ==
=== Founding and clubhouse construction ===
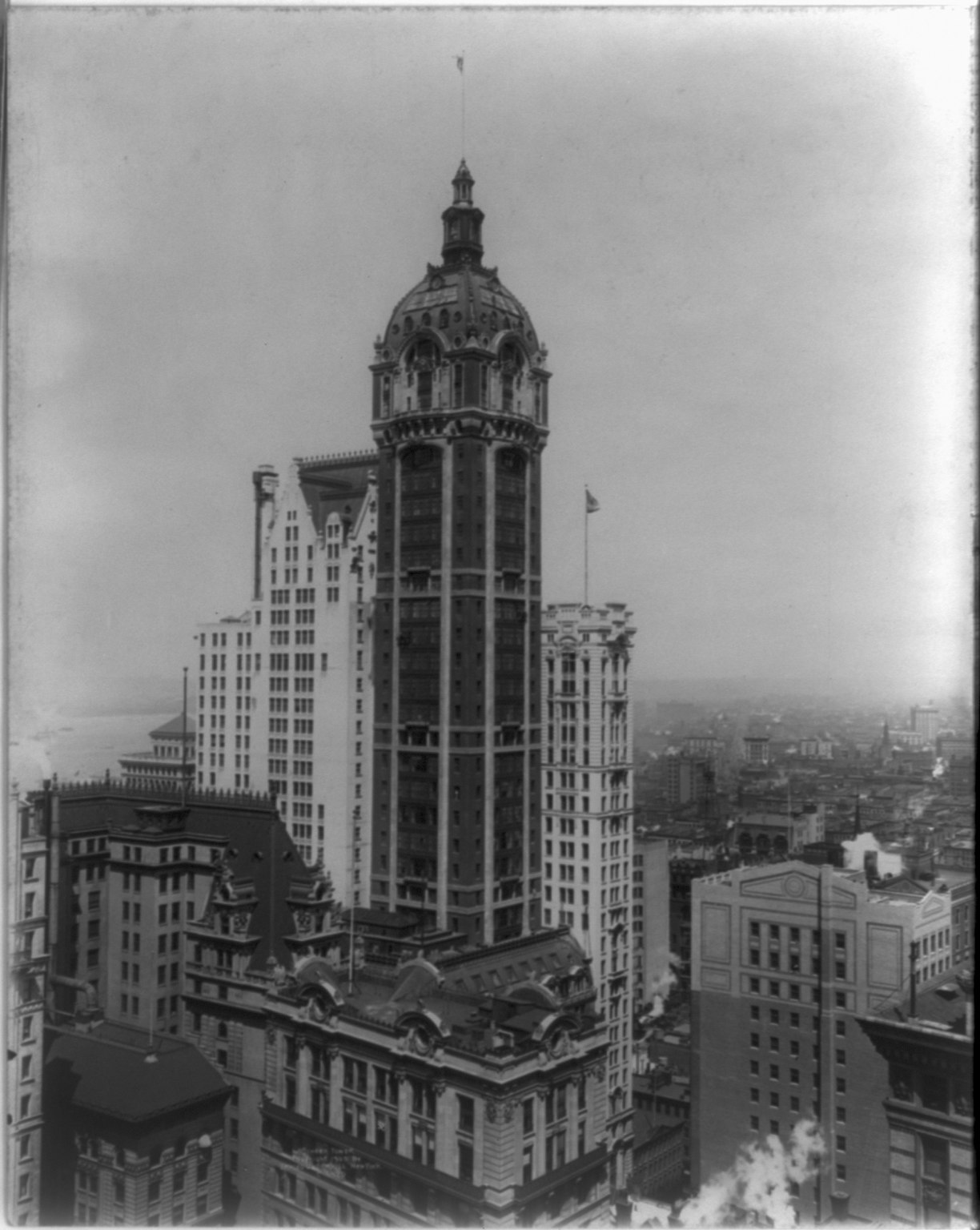
The Singer Building, the original temporary home of the Downtown Athletic Club

The Downtown Athletic Club was organized on September 10, 1926, by a group of lawyers led by Schuyler Van Vechten Hoffman. The Downtown Athletic Club had been organized as a men-only club and would remain that way for the next 51 years. The club was geared toward businessmen, lawyers, and other white-collar workers of the Financial District and other Lower Manhattan neighborhoods. Initially, it was housed in the Singer Building on nearby Broadway. Soon after, the club began planning its own clubhouse, studying other athletic clubs across the United States to determine which features would be included in its building. In 1927, it acquired a plot on West Street from the Whitehall Realty Company, measuring 80 by 180 feet (24 by 55 m). At the time, the club planned to build a 20-story structure. The construction of the Interborough Rapid Transit Company's elevated railroad lines and later the New York City Subway had spurred the relocation of the area's residential population uptown in the late 19th and early 20th centuries. The tenements that developed at the edges of the Financial District were being demolished and replaced with office buildings.

The Downtown Athletic Club already had 1,000 members when it formally announced plans for a clubhouse in February 1928. The new structure would include facilities for numerous sports, and Starrett & van Vleck were selected as the new clubhouse's architects. The limited amount of available space in Lower Manhattan required that the new clubhouse be a skyscraper. The project was expected to cost $4.5 million and initially called for a 44-story skyscraper topped by a pyramid, with recreational facilities on 16 floors and bedrooms and dining rooms on the remaining floors. By November 1928 the plans called for a 17-story clubhouse; contracts for clearing the site of the future clubhouse were awarded the same month. Around 1929, the plans were again modified to 38 stories, and the same year $3 million was loaned toward the building's construction.

By mid-1930, the building was almost completed and 3,500 people had submitted applications for membership. The new clubhouse opened in September 1930, with a special 3-day preview period before the building was turned over to the club. At this point, the club had 3,826 members, 1,000 of whom were "life members". Ultimately the building was composed of 35 stories.

=== Operations ===
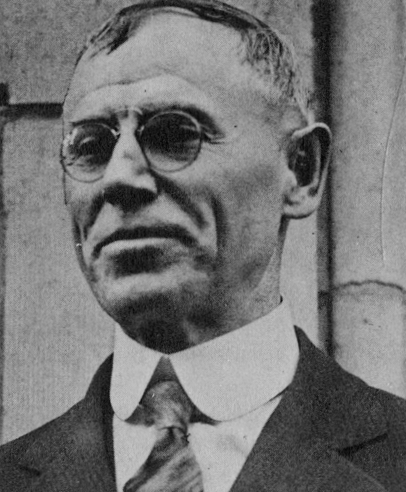
John Heisman, first athletic director of the Downtown Athletic Club

John Heisman was hired as the club's first athletic director in 1930, and he founded a touchdown club at the Downtown Athletic Club, which ultimately became popular. In 1935 club member Willard Prince suggested that the Downtown Athletic Club issue annual trophies for most outstanding college football player, and the first such trophy was awarded that year. When Heisman died in October 1936, the Downtown Athletic Club Trophy became the Heisman Trophy.

Because of the Downtown Athletic Club's wide offerings, it needed at least 5,000 members to remain profitable, and most of its members worked in the financial or law industries or in lower Manhattan. In the aftermath of the Wall Street Crash of 1929, many people in that demographic could no longer pay for the cost of membership. The club declared bankruptcy in April 1936 despite having 3,500 members. It had defaulted on its previous four years of real estate taxes; had claimed earnings before interest and taxes of negative $231,000 during the previous year; and had assets of $4.9 million, including a $4.6 million mortgage on the $4.3 million building. In August 1936, the club mortgaged its property to pay $260,000 of back taxes. In 1947, the building was sold to a third party. The Downtown Athletic Club reacquired title to the building in 1950, having signed a 10-year mortgage with the Connecticut Mutual Life Insurance Company. Full control of the building was reestablished in 1963.

Over the years, several modifications were made to the building. For instance, a bar was added to the restaurant after the repeal of Prohibition, and the 15th-story dining room was expanded westward in 1952 to align with the lower stories' facades on West Street. In addition, many of the original features were removed, such as the golf course. The club reached its maximum membership in the 1960s, with 4,500 members. By 1976, the Downtown Athletic Club had a waiting list and 4,000 members.

The club's members voted to change the club's bylaws in December 1977, allowing women to become members for the first time. The move was largely for economic reasons: to stay solvent, the club needed 3,500 "resident members"—defined as dues-paying members over 30 years old who lived or worked in a 35-mile (56 km) radius—but only had 2,000 such members at the time.

In 1987, an electrical transformer exploded in the building, slightly damaging the 19th and 20th floors.

=== Demise ===
By 1998, The New York Times reported that the club had fewer than 1,300 members and that the structure was "crumbling". Further, the club owed $3 million of back taxes to the New York City government. Discussions were held with local real estate developers to sell off the suites on the top floors and for the club to retain ownership of the lower floors. One such proposal called for the building to be redeveloped as the "Hotel Heisman", with an interior redesign by Rafael Viñoly. However, these plans were complicated by the New York City Landmarks Preservation Commission's desire to officially protect the building's exterior as a city landmark. In 1999, shortly before the club building was set to be auctioned off, the Downtown Athletic Club and its creditors finalized an agreement that would let the club remain in its building and recover from bankruptcy. Under the plan, "at least 13" floors on the lower part of the building, which contained athletic facilities, would be retained by the club. The Connecticut-based firm Cheslock Bakker Associates would renovate the club's bedrooms on the upper floors into a commercial hotel. The Downtown Club building was designated by the Landmarks Preservation Commission as an official city landmark in 2000.

The Downtown Athletic Club closed after the September 11 attacks in 2001. The building was four blocks south of the World Trade Center, which had been destroyed in the attacks. The Downtown Athletic Club building was not damaged, but the building was part of an exclusion zone that the public could not enter for an extended period after the attacks. At the time, the upper floors were undergoing renovations, and all the windows were open, which caused debris and other material to seep into the building. In addition, the building's abandonment led to gradual deterioration of other elements such as peeling paint, burst water pipes, and malfunctioning elevators. The extended closure caused significant decreases in the Downtown Athletic Club's finances, so it considered merging with another club.

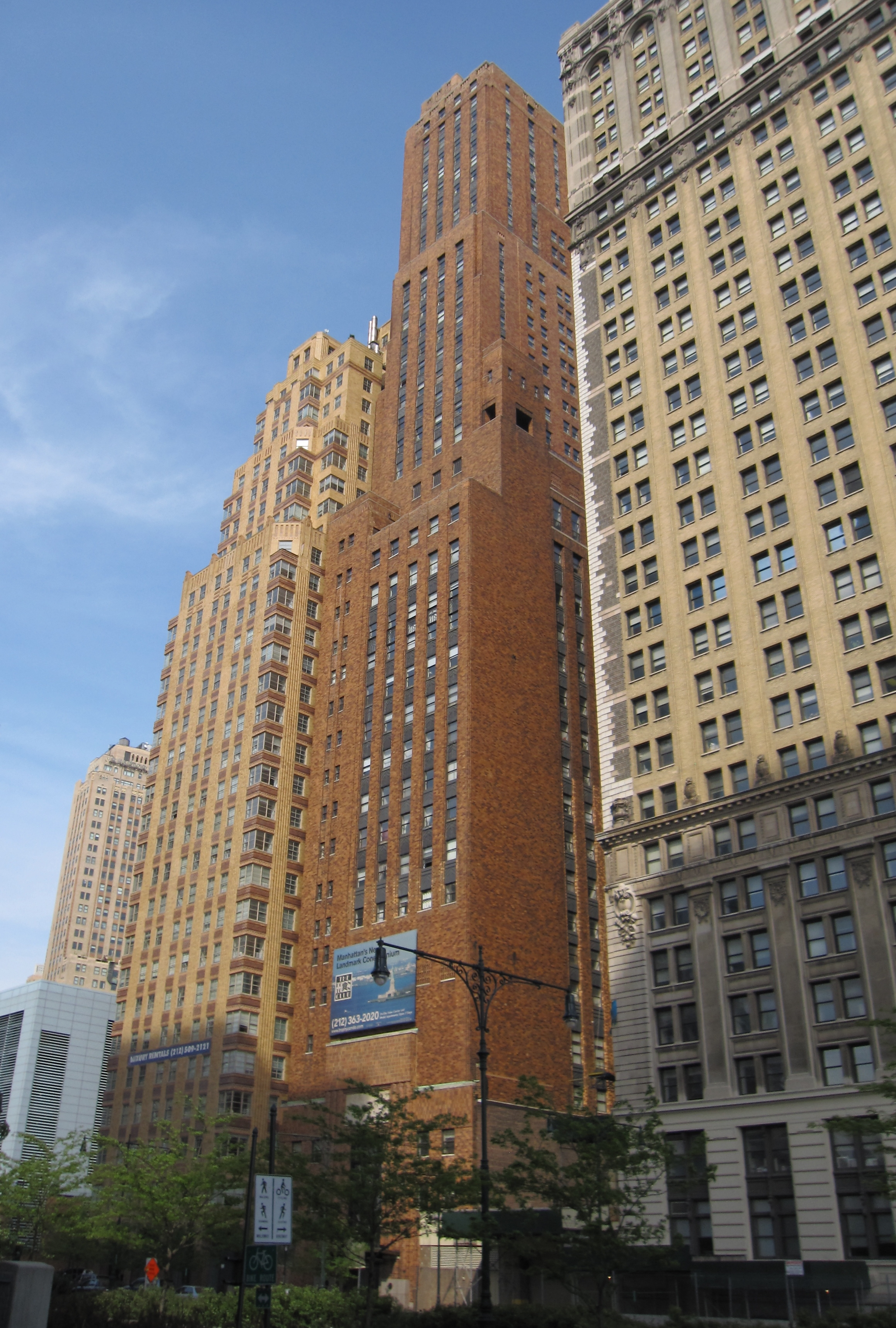
West to east: 21 West Street, Downtown Athletic Club building, Whitehall Building

By November 2001, club officials were still hoping to reopen the club in January 2002, although there was an $8.3 million mortgage due to be paid that August. Furthermore, the building needed another $20 million to $30 million for renovation, yet few club members were able to provide funds, and the club was accumulating debt quickly, losing $100,000 a month. The Downtown Athletic Club was ultimately unable to repay the $8.3 million mortgage. In mid-2003, the Downtown Athletic Club formally turned over the mortgage on 20 West Street and vacated the building completely.

=== Redevelopment ===
The building was converted into a residential tower named the "Downtown Club", which opened in 2005. The redeveloped tower contained 288 condominium units and was renovated by The Moinian Group. At the time of its conversion, most of the units were studio apartments or one-bedroom units costing $400,000 to $1.5 million; some units also included home offices or an additional bedroom. The structure's amenities included a 12,000-square-foot (1,100 m^{2}) fitness center, lounge with pool table, and outdoor terrace. A preschool academy called the Learning Experience was also established in the ground floor.

== Heisman Trophy ==
The Downtown Athletic Club issued the Heisman Trophy, an annual event that recognizes the most outstanding player in National Collegiate Athletic Association college football. First awarded in 1935, the award was later renamed after former athletic director Heisman. The trophy itself is made out of cast bronze, measures 13.5 inches (340 mm) tall by 14 inches (360 mm) long by 16 inches (410 mm) wide, and weighs 45 pounds (20 kg).

After the club closed, the Heisman Trust took over administration of the award. The award ceremony was moved to numerous locations, including the Yale Club of New York City and Hilton New York, before moving to the Palladium Times Square in 2005.

== See also ==
- Art Deco architecture of New York City
- List of New York City Designated Landmarks in Manhattan below 14th Street
