= Surface freezing =

Surface freezing is the appearance of long-range crystalline order in a near-surface layer of a liquid. The surface freezing effect is opposite to a far more common surface melting, or premelting.

Surface freezing was experimentally discovered in melts of alkanes and related chain molecules in the early 1990s independently by two groups: John Earnshaw and his group (Queen's University of Belfast) used light scattering. This method did not allow a determination of the frozen layer's thickness, and whether or not it is laterally ordered. A group led by Ben Ocko (Brookhaven National Laboratory), Eric Sirota (Exxon) and Moshe Deutsch (Bar-Ilan University, Israel) independently discovered the same effect, using x-ray surface diffraction which allowed them to show that the frozen layer is a crystalline monolayer, with molecules oriented roughly along the surface normal, and ordered in an hexagonal lattice.

A related effect, the existence of a smectic phase at the surface of a nematic liquid bulk, was observed in liquid crystals by Jens Als-Nielsen (Risø National Laboratory, Denmark) and Peter Pershan (Harvard University) in the early 1980s. However, the surface layer there was neither ordered, nor confined to a single layer.

Surface freezing has since been found in a wide range of chain molecules and at various interfaces: liquid-air, liquid-solid and liquid-liquid.
