= Regelation =

Physical phenomenon

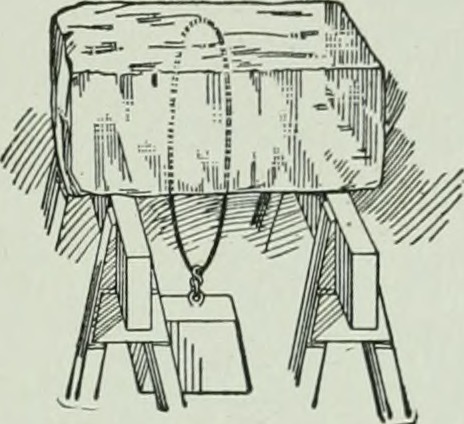
Classic experiment involving regelation of an ice block as a tensioned wire passes through it.

Regelation is the phenomenon of ice melting under pressure and refreezing when the pressure is reduced. This can be demonstrated by looping a fine wire around a block of ice, with a heavy weight attached to it. The pressure exerted on the ice slowly melts it locally, permitting the wire to pass through the entire block. The wire's track will refill as soon as pressure is relieved, so the ice block will remain intact even after wire passes completely through. This experiment is possible for ice at −10 °C or cooler, and while essentially valid, the details of the process by which the wire passes through the ice are complex. The phenomenon works best with high thermal conductivity materials such as copper, since latent heat of fusion from the top side needs to be transferred to the lower side to supply latent heat of melting. In short, the phenomenon in which ice converts to liquid due to applied pressure and then re-converts to ice once the pressure is removed is called regelation.

Regelation was discovered by Michael Faraday. It occurs only for substances such as ice, that have the property of expanding upon freezing, for the melting points of those substances decrease with the increasing external pressure. The melting point of ice falls by 0.0072 °C for each additional atm of pressure applied. For example, a pressure of 500 atmospheres is needed for ice to melt at −4 °C.

== Surface melting ==
Melting curve of ice

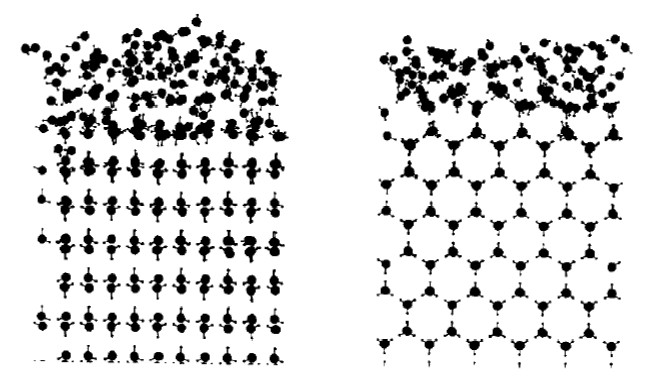
Molecular structure of ice near the surface

For normal crystalline ice far below its melting point, there will be some relaxation of the atoms near the surface. Simulations of ice near to its melting point show that there is significant melting of the surface layers rather than a symmetric relaxation of atom positions. Nuclear magnetic resonance provided evidence for a liquid layer on the surface of ice. In 1998, using atomic force microscopy, Astrid Döppenschmidt and Hans-Jürgen Butt measured the thickness of the liquid-like layer on ice to be roughly 32 nm at −1 °C, and 11 nm at −10 °C.

The surface melting can account for the following:

- Low coefficient of friction of ice, as experienced by skaters.
- Ease of compaction of ice
- High adhesion of ice surfaces

== Examples of regelation ==
A glacier can exert a sufficient amount of pressure on its lower surface to lower the melting point of its ice. The melting of the ice at the glacier's base allows it to move from a higher elevation to a lower elevation. Liquid water may flow from the base of a glacier at lower elevations when the temperature of the air is above the freezing point of water.

== Misconceptions ==
At least one 1992 article suggests it is a slightly misconceived misconception to ascribe regelation to ice skating. The problem with matching the (large) magnitude of the water-ice p-V gradient above the triple point boundary with the magnitudes of prevailing temperature and pressure in the case of the ice skating context applies equally in the context of the classic lab experiment with a copper wire cutting through an 10cm ice block with say a 28 swg wire. The misconception is not that these observations fail to be regelation but that regelation can be explained (solely) in terms of the magnitude of p-V gradient above the triple point. There is much more going on. Regelation is empirical—it is a phenomenon as was, for example, Brownian Motion before, during, and arguably even after Einstein modelled it. It has been so widely observed and described that we generalise to describing it in terms of pressure causing increased surface melting. The recognition of this phenomenon in all the mentioned contexts is not in doubt. Car tyres work in snow even though there is some increased surface melting because they have tread which allows water to be liberated.

Ice skating is given as an example of regelation; however, the pressure required is much greater than the weight of a skater. Additionally, regelation does not explain how one can ice skate at sub-zero (0°C) temperatures.

Compaction and creation of snow balls is another example from old texts. Here, the pressure required is far greater than the pressure that can be applied by hand. A counter example is that cars do not melt snow as they run over it.

== See also ==
- Premelting
