= Quasi-solid =

Matter apparently intermediate between solids and liquids

Quasi-solid, false-solid, or partial-solid, or semi-solid are terms for a substance which is not clearly a solid or a liquid. While similar to solids in some respects, such as having the ability to support their own weight and hold their shapes, a quasi-solid also shares some properties of liquids, such as conforming in shape to something applying pressure to it and the ability to flow under pressure. The words quasi-solid, partial-solid, and partial-liquid are used interchangeably. The term "semi-solid" is sometimes used interchangeably with these terms but is not a correct term, as "semi" means two equal halves.

Quasi-solids and partial-solids are sometimes described as amorphous because at the microscopic scale they have a disordered structure unlike crystalline solids. They should not be confused with amorphous solids as they are not solids and exhibit properties such as flow which solids do not.

== Examples ==
- Pharmaceutical and cosmetic creams, gels, and ointments, e.g. petroleum jelly, toothpaste, hand sanitizer
- Foods, e.g. guacamole, salsa, whipping cream, dessert, jam
- Feces

== See also ==
- Plasticity (physics)
- Viscosity
- Premelting
- Non-Newtonian fluid
- Supersolid
