= 21 West Street =

Residential skyscraper in Manhattan, New York

- U.S. National Register of Historic Places
- New York State Register of Historic Places
- New York City Landmark
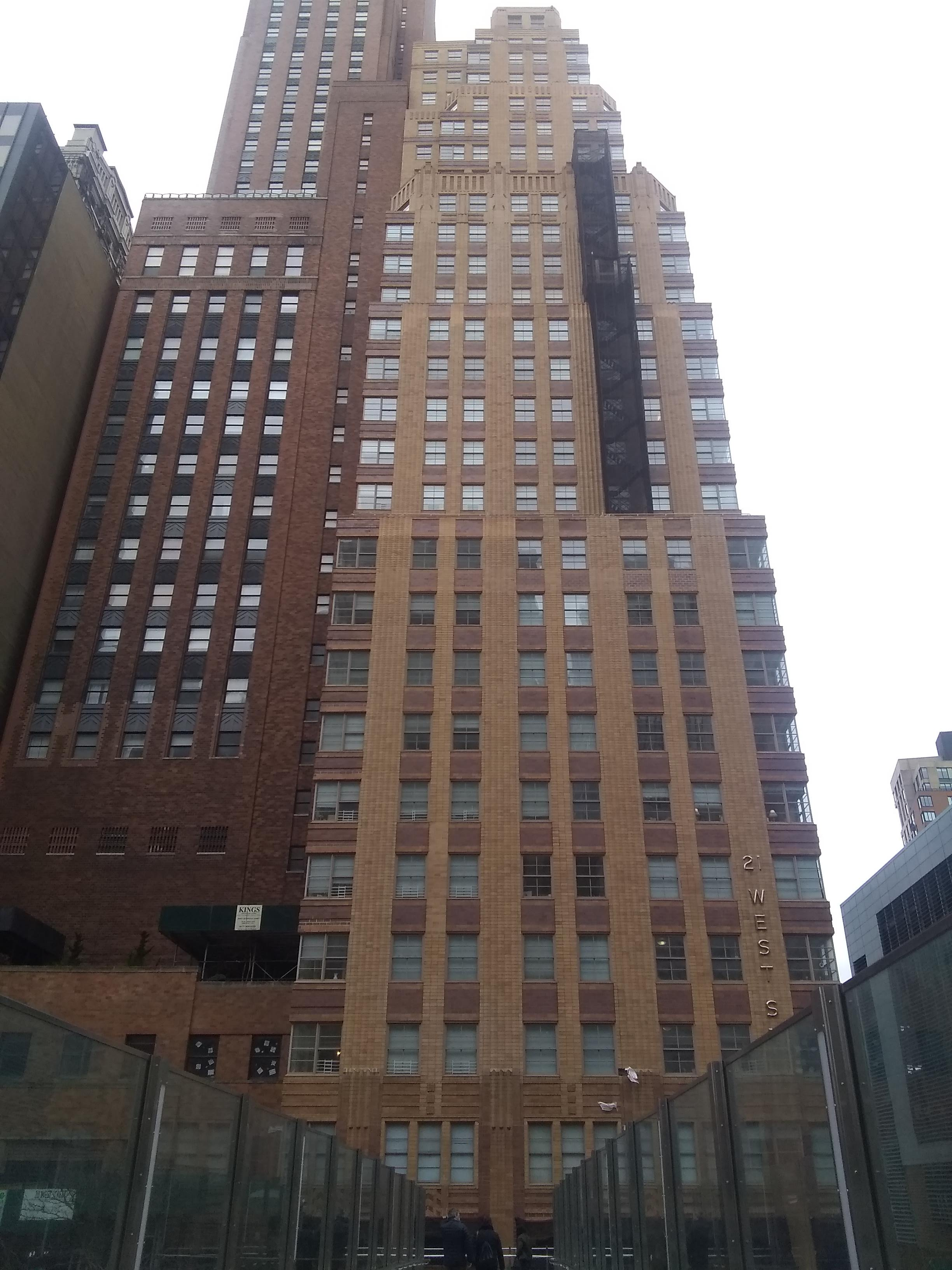
- 21 West Street, with Downtown Athletic Club at left, 2020
- Location: 21 West Street, New York City
- Coordinates: 40°42′23″N 74°00′56″W
- Area: less than one acre
- Built: 1929–1931
- Architect: Starrett & van Vleck
- Architectural style: Art Deco
- NRHP reference No.: 99000316
- NYSRHP No.: 06101.010481
- NYCL No.: 1999

Significant dates
- Added to NRHP: March 12, 1999
- Designated NYSRHP: September 21, 1998
- Designated NYCL: June 16, 1998

21 West Street, also known as Le Rivage Apartments, is a 33-story building located in the Financial District of Lower Manhattan in New York City, on Morris Street between West Street and Washington Street. It was built in 1929–1931 as a speculative office tower development in anticipation of an increased demand for office space in Lower Manhattan. The building was converted into apartments in 1997 and was renamed Le Rivage.

The building has an Art Deco design with many lavish architectural finishes and a series of setbacks which taper toward the top floors. It was designed by Starrett & van Vleck, who at the same time designed the adjacent Downtown Athletic Club. 21 West Street was listed on the National Register of Historic Places in 1999 and designated a city landmark by the New York City Landmarks Preservation Commission in 1998.

== Site ==
21 West Street is located near the southernmost point of Manhattan Island, closest to its western shore. The building faces West Street to the west, Morris Street to the north, and Washington Street and the Brooklyn–Battery Tunnel portal to the east. It is adjacent to the Downtown Athletic Club building at 18–20 West Street to the south, (Note: Address numbers on the east side of West Street run consecutively because the west side of the street was formerly on the waterfront. Therefore, 18–20 West Street is adjacent to 21 West Street. In the area's standard address numbering system, odd- and even-numbered addresses are on opposite sides of the street.) which also occupies the entire block between West and Washington Streets. The lot has a frontage of 75 feet (23 m) on each of West and Washington Streets, and 179 feet (55 m) on Morris Street, covering a total area of 13,500 square feet (1,250 m^{2}).

The building stands on filled land along the shore of the North River (an archaic name for the southernmost portion of the Hudson River). The surrounding neighborhood, the Financial District, was the first part of Manhattan to be developed as part of New Netherland and later New York City; its population growth led city officials to add land on Manhattan's shore by filling and land reclamation in the 18th and 19th centuries. As the North River shoreline was deeper and had a denser concentration of buildings than the East River shoreline on the east side of Manhattan Island, the land under 21 West Street was not filled until 1835, when debris from the Great Fire of New York was dumped there. As a result of the land filling, 21 West Street was constructed without a basement, which was "a decidedly rare feature" in New York City buildings, hence the need to import steam and electricity. The site of 21 West Street was first occupied by small landowners who built houses in the area. The surrounding neighborhood became a financial and shipping hub during the late 19th century; as the Financial District became more densely developed, the residential landowners moved uptown and their former lands were combined to build larger commercial buildings.

== Architecture ==
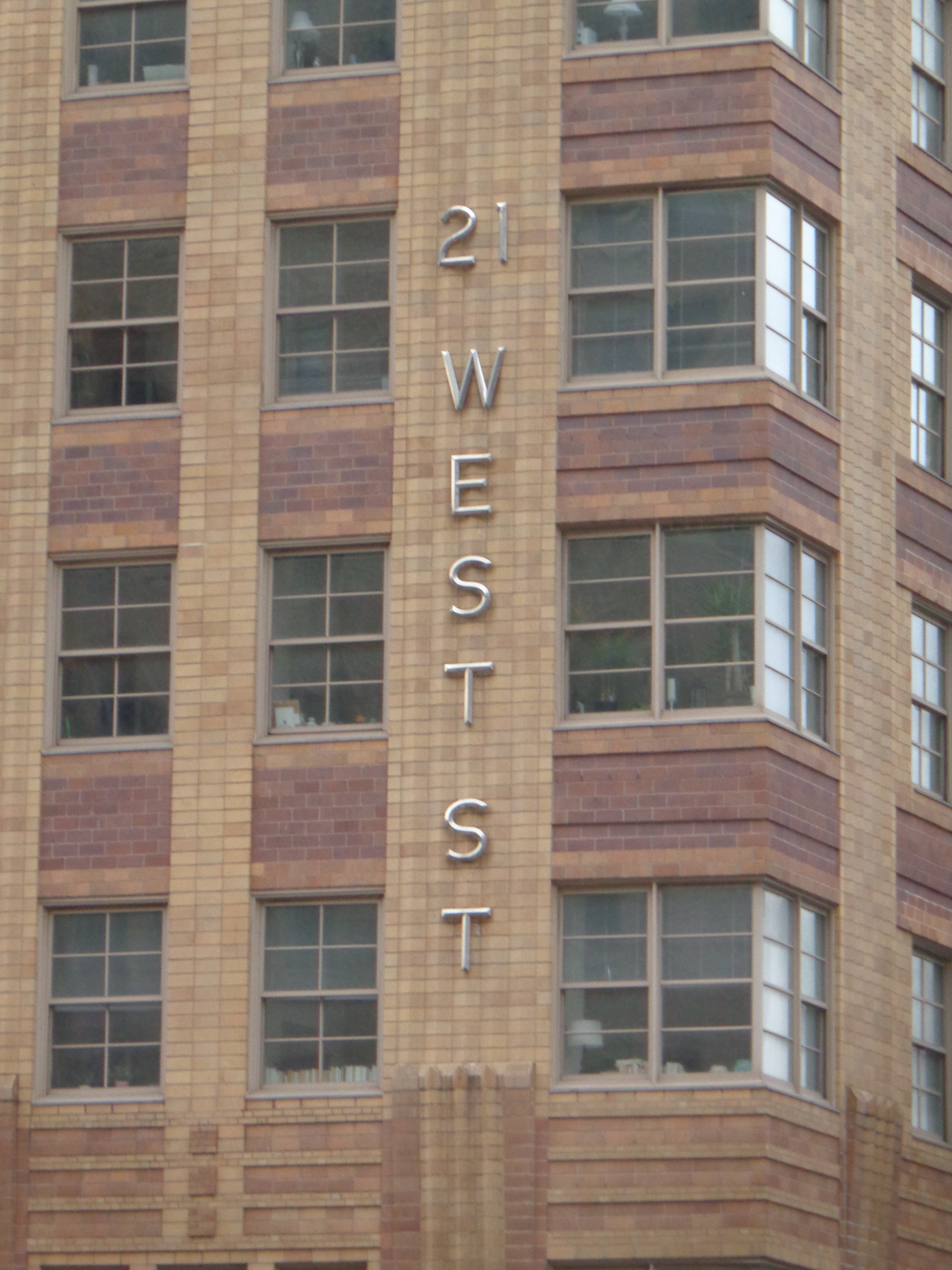
Facade detail showing corner windows at right

21 West Street is 31 stories tall. (Note: The New York City Landmarks Preservation Commission refers to the floor above ground level as the "second story", with the double-height ground floor considered as one story, and thus regards 21 West Street as being 31 stories tall. The National Park Service refers to the floor above ground level as the "third story", considering the ground floor as the equivalent of two stories, and thus regards 21 West Street as being a 32-story building.) It was designed in the Art Deco style by Starrett & van Vleck, who simultaneously designed the adjacent Downtown Athletic Club building in the same style. The two buildings were constructed for different purposes and accordingly have different appearances; namely, the facade of 21 West Street is lighter in color than that of the Downtown Athletic Club. Starrett & van Vleck had already designed several New York City department stores, including the Lord & Taylor, Bloomingdale's, and Saks Fifth Avenue buildings. Architectural historian Anthony W. Robins described 21 West Street as "one of the area's handsome Art Deco towers".

=== Form and facade ===
As mandated by the 1916 Zoning Resolution, the design of 21 West Street features six setbacks. The setbacks create the impression that the building tapers off as it ascends. The setbacks are placed on the Washington Street elevation above the 10th and 16th floors; at the northwest and northeast corners above the 21st floor; and on all sides above the 26th, 29th, and 30th floors. (Note: In this article, the floor above ground level is referred to as the "second floor", even though the ground level is the equivalent of two stories. All subsequent stories are referred to using this same pattern.)

The facade of 21 West Street was designed with molded and oversized brick "to emphasize the structural lines and to enrich the texture of the materials". Red, orange, yellow, and purple brick and terracotta were used. The polychrome design was influenced by Harvey Wiley Corbett's plan for the Master Apartments on the Upper West Side of Manhattan. For instance, the light-tan vertical piers highlight the building's vertical dimension, while other brick patterns give the impression of a "skin", including the horizontal lines of the spandrels between the floors. At each setback and on the three lower levels, the parapets have various designs of molded brick to provide surface texture to the building's exterior. The southern facade is hidden behind the Downtown Athletic Club building to the south.

==== Arcade ====
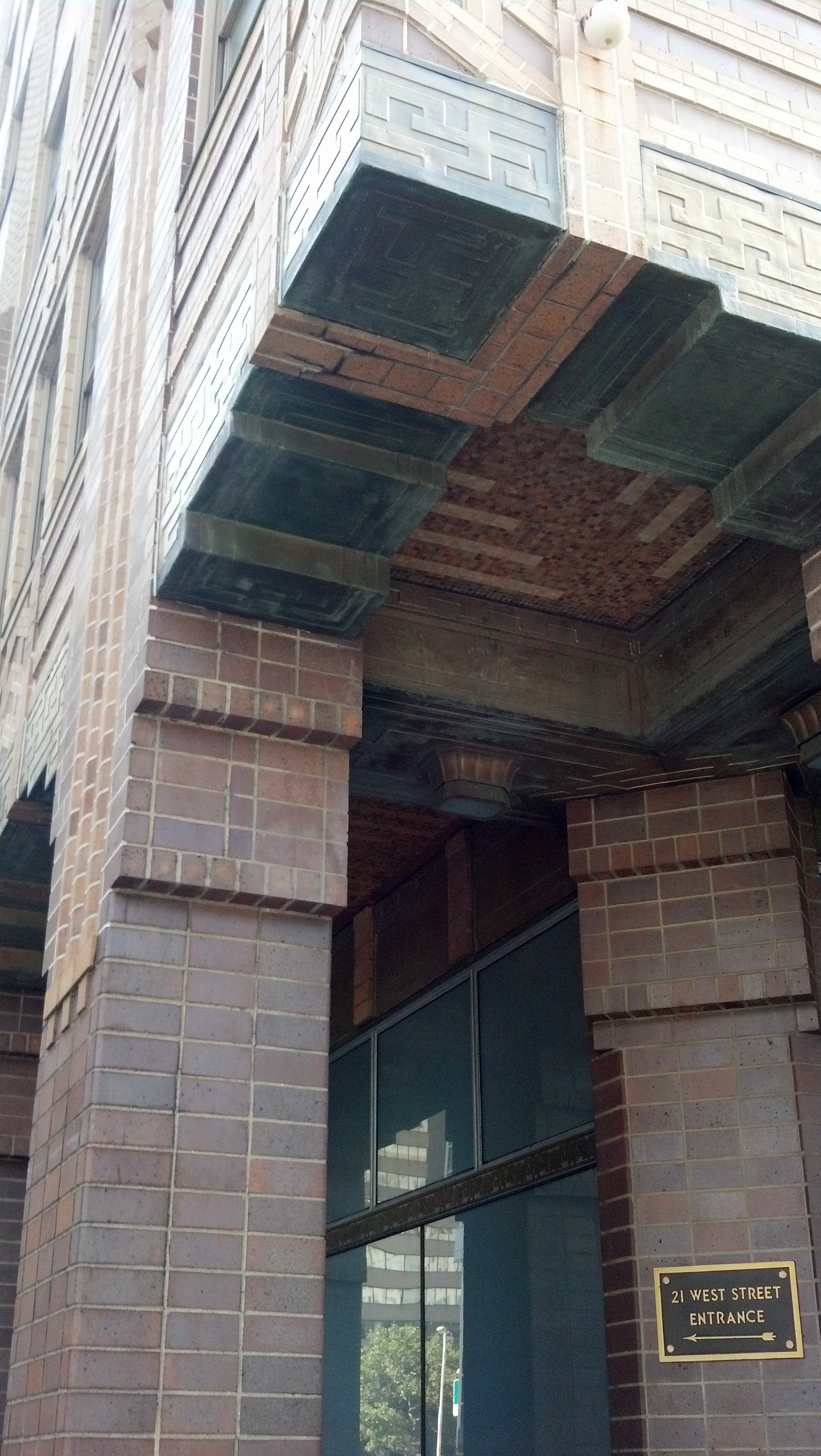
Underside of one of the corners, facing the arcade on Morris Street

The building has a ground-story arcade which overhangs much of the Morris Street sidewalk, giving the impression that pedestrians have been transported inside the building. The arcade is ten bays wide on Morris Street. Despite its address, 21 West Street's primary entrance is at the center of the Morris Street elevation, within the arcade. Smaller five-bay-wide arcades exist along the West and Washington Street elevations.

The arches of the arcade are mostly laid in stepped brickwork. On the Morris Street elevation, the fifth bay from the east is a square marble-framed arch that leads to the main entrance. The spandrels above the arcade are textured in a chevron (V-shaped) design with tan and purple brick. There are numerous storefronts beneath the arcade, as well as the entrance to the building's lobby. The arcade, storefronts, and main entrance contain decorative metalwork painted in silver and gold tones, which extend into the interior. The metalwork was described by the National Park Service as "an unusual design feature". The piers and interior walls of the arcade are outfitted with bronze panels and lighting installations. The ceiling of the arcade has multicolored and patterned mosaics.

==== Upper stories ====
21 West Street contains a uniform fenestration pattern in contrast to the Downtown Athletic Club, which has several windowless floors. Above the ground floor, each floor of 21 West Street generally contains two rolled steel windows per bay, with wrap-around windows at the corners, each of these windows having four panes, two on each side. One exception to this is the second floor, which has three windows per bay, also with wrap-around windows at the corners; the second-floor bays are separated by purple and tan brick piers. Below the setbacks on the 21st and 26th floors, the corners facing Morris Street are replaced with a single diagonal chamfered bay.

The corners of the building were outfitted with windows wrapping around the edge at a 90-degree angle. This was a contrast to previous buildings with structural columns at their corners. 21 West Street possibly the first commercial building in the U.S. to have wrap-around corner windows. (Note: The Landmarks Preservation Commission described this as a fine distinction: the Master Apartments on the Upper West Side (built 1928–1929) was cited as the first residential skyscraper with corner windows, and the Child's Restaurant building at 604 Fifth Avenue in Midtown Manhattan (built 1925) was cited as the first building of any kind with such windows.) Prior to the construction of 21 West Street, corner windows had only been used on residential structures. After 21 West Street was built, corner windows were used on several buildings in the Central Park West Historic District and in several Bronx apartment buildings.

=== Features ===
Having constructed 21 West Street as a speculative development in anticipation of growing demand for office space in lower Manhattan, the building's developers aimed to attract potential tenants through the unique design of the structure. When built, 21 West Street included high-speed elevators and other innovations "to contribute to the comfort and convenience of its tenants". A lobby, 1 1/2 stories high, is located on the north side of the ground floor, linking to the two elevator banks. The lobby has a colorful marble mosaic on its floor, depicting the old street grid of Lower Manhattan in a style similar to a mariner's map. There are bronze lighting installations near the elevator banks, decorated with waves and shell motifs.

Since its conversion to an apartment building, the interior of 21 West Street has included a terrace on the 34th floor, a play area for children, and a fitness room. The rooms were created from former office spaces; for instance, the play area was previously a locker room.

== History ==
The construction of 21 West Street occurred when the Financial District was being expanded as a commercial area. The construction of the Interborough Rapid Transit Company's elevated railroad lines, and later the New York City Subway, had spurred the relocation of the area's residential population uptown in the late 19th and early 20th centuries; the tenements that developed at the edges of the Financial District were being demolished and replaced with office buildings.

The building was owned by the 21 West Street Corporation, which had close ties with the maritime industry along the Hudson River. It was developed by civil engineer Alfred Rheinstein. Work began on the structure in 1929, the foundations had been laid by April 1930, and building work was completed in 1931. Real estate agents William A. White & Sons were hired to rent out the space in 21 West Street. After the building's completion, the owners identified tenants in the maritime and shipping industries, including lawyers, transport companies, and import/export companies associated with the sector. In addition, naval architecture firm Gibbs & Cox was headquartered at the building for over 30 years. Other early tenants included the Peruvian consulate in New York City, the Moran Towing and Transportation Company, the Shepard Steamship Company, and the Hedger Transportation Corporation. Around 1950, the main entrance was modified and a heating, ventilation, and air conditioning system was installed.

In 1997, the residential development and management firm, Rose Associates, announced plans to convert 21 West Street into a 293-unit apartment building called Le Rivage. It was to be the firm's first project in 10 years and its first Manhattan project below 8th Street. The building was designated a city landmark by the New York City Landmarks Preservation Commission in 1998, and was listed on the National Park Service's National Register of Historic Places the following year, at which time it was recorded in the register that 21 West Street had been "abandoned for over a decade". When the building was damaged in Hurricane Sandy in 2012, residents' rents were temporarily lowered. The residential units in 21 West Street were partially renovated in 2014.

== See also ==
- Art Deco architecture of New York City
- National Register of Historic Places listings in Manhattan below 14th Street
- List of New York City Designated Landmarks in Manhattan below 14th Street
