= Vaseline =

Brand of petroleum jelly-based products

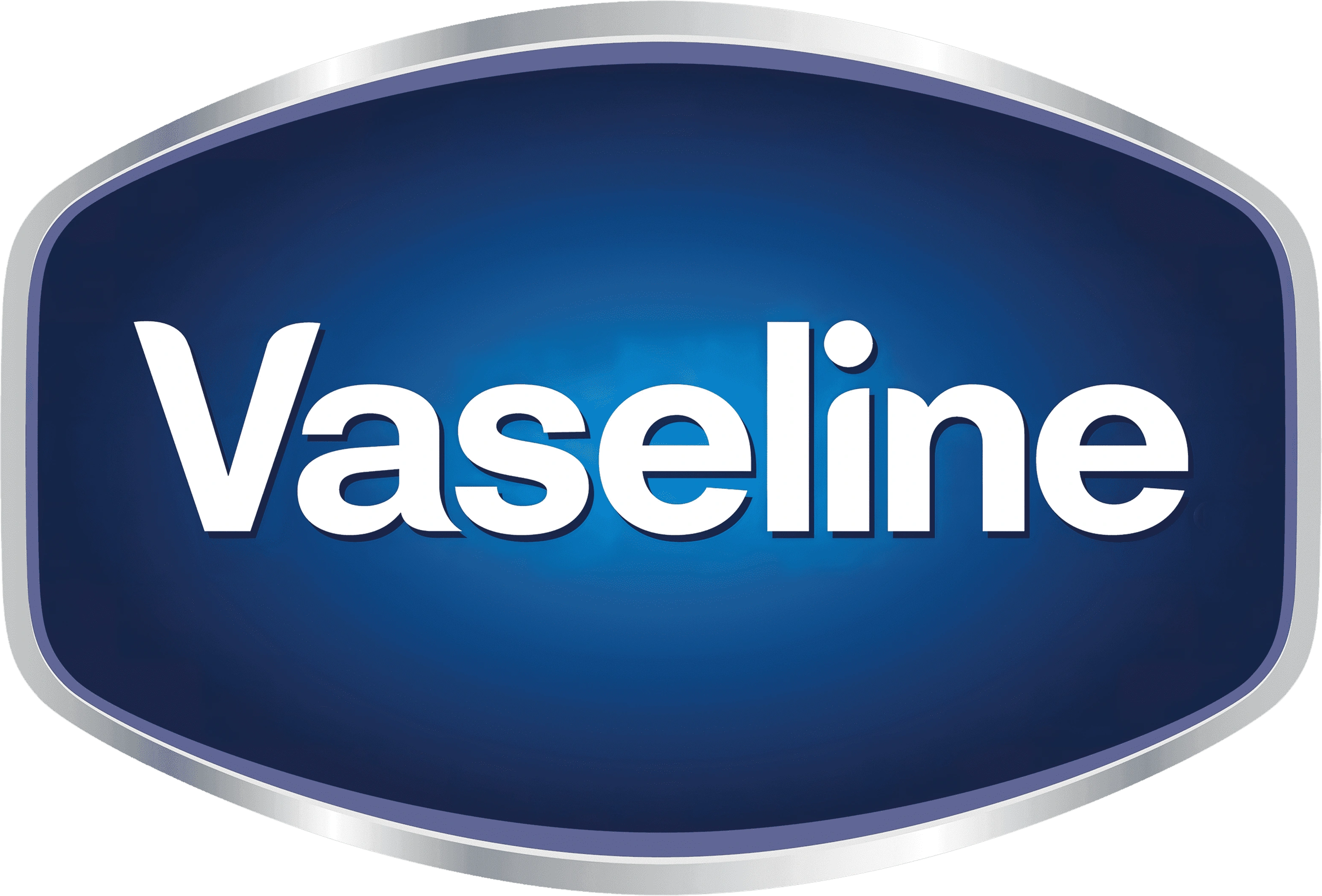
- Product type: Petroleum jelly, body lotion
- Current owner: Unilever
- Country: United States
- Introduced: 1872; 154 years ago
- Markets: Worldwide
- Website: vaseline.com

Vaseline (/ˈvæsəliːn/) (Note: Also pronounced with the main stress on the last syllable /ˌvæsəˈliːn/.) is an American brand of petroleum jelly-based products owned by Unilever. Products include plain petroleum jelly and a selection of skin creams, soaps, lotions, cleansers, and deodorants.

In many languages, the word "vaseline" is used as a genericized word for petroleum jelly.

== History ==
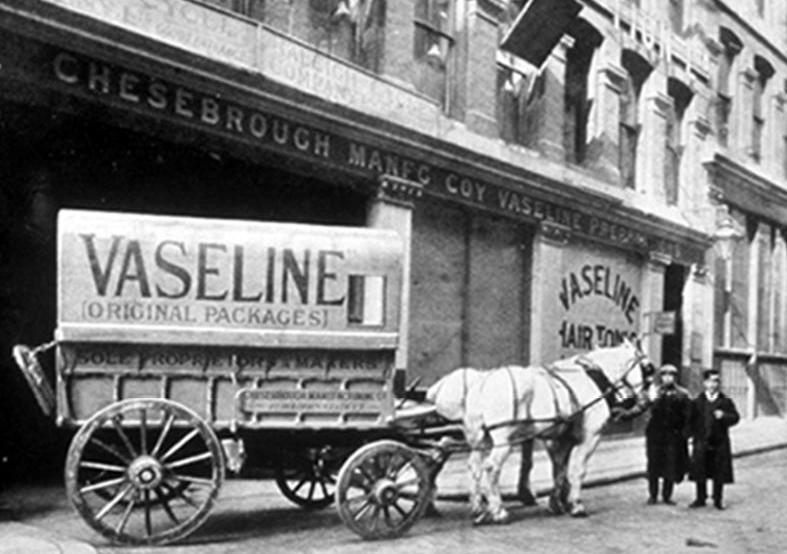
An image from Vaseline company archives

In 1859, Robert Chesebrough, a chemist who formerly clarified lamp oil from sperm oil, a waxy oil from the heads of sperm whales, was losing business as whale oil was replaced by petroleum-derived coal oil. He traveled to the oil fields in Titusville, Pennsylvania, to research what new materials might be created from this new fuel. There he learned of a residue called rod wax that had to be periodically removed from oil rig pumps. The oil workers had been using the substance to heal cuts and burns. Chesebrough took samples of the rod wax back to Brooklyn, extracted the usable petroleum jelly, and began manufacturing a medicinal product he called Vaseline.

The first known reference to the name Vaseline was by the Chesebrough Manufacturing Company in the U.S. patent (U.S. Patent 127,568) in 1872. "I, Robert Chesebrough, have invented a new and useful product from petroleum which I have named Vaseline..."

The name "vaseline" is said by the manufacturer to be derived from German Wasser "water" + Greek έλαιον (elaion) "oil".

Vaseline was made by the Chesebrough Manufacturing Company until the company, which merged with Pond's in 1955, was purchased by Unilever in 1987.

== Uses ==
Vaseline in its container

Vaseline can be used as a lubricant for metallic and plastic surfaces. It can also be used as a moisture insulator for local skin conditions characterized by dry skin, such as atopic dermatitis and eczema. Vaseline should not be used as a sexual lubricant, as it may increase the risk for bacterial vaginosis, damage latex condoms, and is not recommended for internal use.

== Topical application ==
As a petrolatum product, Vaseline is used as a topical moisturizer which assists with skin water retention by acting as an occlusive agent that prevents evaporation of water from the stratum corneum (outermost skin layer) and seals out external water. Vaseline is intended for external use only, and is not recommended for deep skin cuts or punctures, animal bites, or serious burns. Topical petrolatum products like Vaseline are used to manage and relieve atopic dermatitis and eczema in adults.

Vaseline contains mineral oils. Unrefined mineral oils often contain adulterants including polycyclic aromatic hydrocarbons (PAHs), which can increase risk for certain forms of cancer when consumed orally. When used topically (as is recommended with Vaseline), dermal absorption of PAHs is insignificant. No link between topical petroleum jelly-based moisturizers and cancer has been found in large studies over many years.
