= Petroleum jelly =

Chemical substance used as a lubricating agent and topical ointment

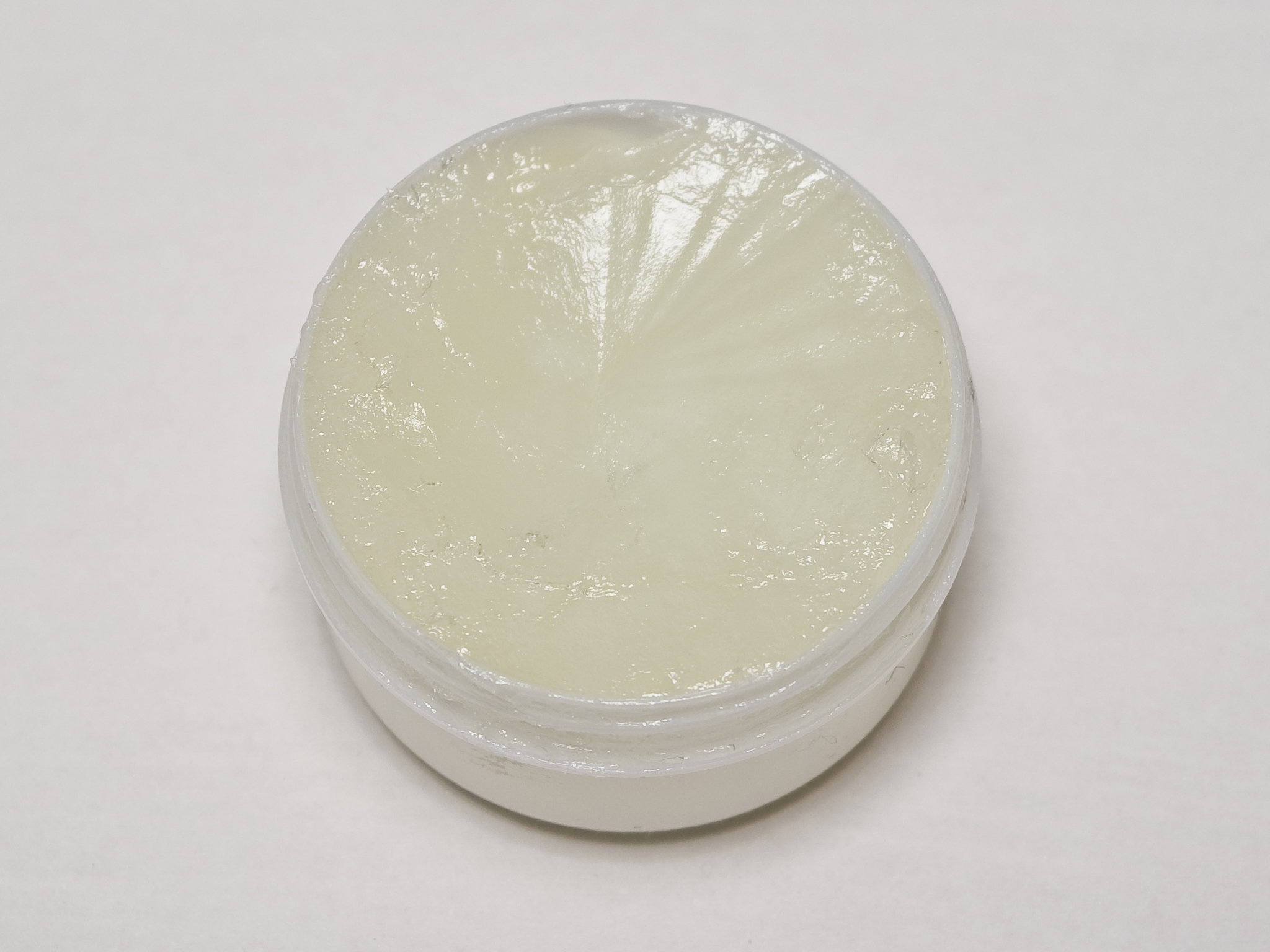
Petroleum jelly

Petroleum jelly, petrolatum (/ˌpɛtrəˈleɪtəm/), white petrolatum, soft paraffin, or multi-hydrocarbon, CAS number 8009-03-8, is a quasi-solid mixture of hydrocarbons (with carbon numbers mainly higher than 25), commonly promoted as a topical ointment for its healing properties. Vaseline has been the dominant brand of petroleum jelly sold since 1870.

After petroleum jelly became a medicine cabinet staple, consumers began to use it for cosmetic purposes and for many ailments including toenail fungus, genital rashes (non-STI), nosebleeds, diaper rash, and common colds. Its folkloric medicinal value as a "cure-all" has since been limited by a better scientific understanding of appropriate and inappropriate uses. It is widely recognized as a skin protectant and is in common use for cosmetic skin care, where it is often loosely referred to as mineral oil.

== History ==
Original US patent application for the Vaseline product

In 1273, Marco Polo described the exportation of Baku oil by hundreds of camels and ships for burning and as an ointment for treating mange.

Native Americans discovered the use of petroleum jelly for shielding and healing the skin. Sophisticated oil pits had been built as early as 1415–1450 in Western Pennsylvania. In 1859, workers operating the United States' first oil rigs noticed a paraffin-like material forming on rigs in the course of investigating malfunctions. Believing the substance hastened healing, the workers used the jelly on cuts and burns.

Robert Chesebrough, a young chemist whose previous work of distilling fuel from the oil of sperm whales had been rendered obsolete by petroleum, went to Titusville, Pennsylvania, to see what new materials had commercial potential. Chesebrough took the unrefined green-to-gold-colored "rod wax", as the drillers called it, back to his laboratory to refine it and explore potential uses. He discovered that by distilling the lighter, thinner oil products from the rod wax, he could create a light-colored gel. Chesebrough patented the process of making petroleum jelly by U.S. patent 127,568 in 1872. The process involved vacuum distillation of the crude material followed by filtration of the still residue through bone char. Chesebrough traveled around New York demonstrating the product to encourage sales by burning his skin with acid or an open flame, then spreading the ointment on his injuries and showing his past injuries healed, he said, by his miracle product. He opened his first factory in 1870 in Brooklyn using the name Vaseline.

== Physical properties ==
Petroleum jelly is a mixture of hydrocarbons, with a melting point that depends on the exact proportions. The melting point is typically between 40 and 70 °C (105 and 160 °F). It is flammable only when heated to liquid; then the fumes will light, not the liquid itself, so a wick material is needed to ignite petroleum jelly. It is colorless (or of a pale yellow color when not highly distilled), translucent, and devoid of flavour and odour when pure. It does not oxidize on exposure to the air and is not readily acted on by chemical reagents. It is insoluble in water. It is soluble in dichloromethane, chloroform, benzene, diethyl ether, carbon disulfide and turpentine. Petroleum jelly is slightly soluble in alcohol. It acts as a plasticizer on polypropylene (PP), but is compatible with a wide range of materials and chemicals. It is a semi-solid, in that it holds its shape indefinitely like a solid, but it can be forced to take the shape of its container without breaking apart, like a liquid, though it does not flow on its own. Its microstructure is made up of partially crystalline stacks of lamellar sheets which immobilize the liquid portion. In general, only 7–13% of it is made up of high molecular weight paraffins, 30–45% of smaller paraffins, and 48–60% of small paraffins.

Depending on the specific application of petroleum jelly, it may be USP, B.P., or Ph. Eur. grade. This pertains to the processing and handling of the petroleum jelly so it is suitable for medicinal and personal-care applications.

== Uses ==
Petroleum jelly has lubricating and coating properties, including use on dry lips and dry skin. Below are some examples of the uses of petroleum jelly.

=== Medical treatment ===
The American Academy of Dermatology recommends keeping skin injuries moist with petroleum jelly to reduce scarring. A verified medicinal use is to protect and prevent moisture loss of the skin of a patient in the initial post-operative period following laser skin resurfacing.

Petroleum jelly is used extensively by otorhinolaryngologists—ear, nose, and throat doctors—for nasal moisture and epistaxis treatment, and to combat nasal crusting. Large studies have found petroleum jelly applied to the nose for short durations to have no significant side effects.

Historically, it was also consumed for internal use and even promoted as "Vaseline confection".

Vaseline brand First Aid Petroleum Jelly, or carbolated petroleum jelly containing phenol to give the jelly additional antibacterial effect, has been discontinued.

=== Skin and hair care ===
Most petroleum jelly today is used as an ingredient in skin lotions and cosmetics, providing various types of skin care and protection by minimizing friction or reducing moisture loss, or by functioning as a grooming aid (e.g., pomade). It is also used for treating dry scalp and dandruff. Although long known as just an occlusive, recent studies show that it is actually able to penetrate into the stratum corneum and helps in better absorption of other cosmetic products. Applying a significant amount of petroleum jelly onto one's face before bed is known as "slugging".

During World War II, a variety of petroleum jelly called red veterinary petrolatum, or Red Vet Pet for short, was often included in life raft survival kits. Acting as a sunscreen, it provided protection against ultraviolet rays.

==== Preventing moisture loss ====
By reducing the loss of moisture via transepidermal water loss, petroleum jelly can prevent chapped hands and lips, and soften nail cuticles.

This property is exploited to provide heat insulation: petroleum jelly can be used to keep swimmers warm in water when training, or during channel crossings or long ocean swims. It can prevent chilling of the face due to evaporation of skin moisture during cold weather outdoor sports.

==== Hair grooming ====
In the first part of the twentieth century, petroleum jelly, either pure or as an ingredient, was also popular as a hair pomade. When used in a 50/50 mixture with pure beeswax, it makes an effective moustache wax.

==== Skin lubrication ====
Petroleum jelly can be used to reduce the friction between skin and clothing during various sport activities, for example to prevent chafing of the seat region of cyclists, or the nipples of long-distance runners wearing loose T-shirts, and is commonly used in the groin area of wrestlers and footballers.

Petroleum jelly is commonly used as a sexual lubricant, because it does not dry out like water-based lubricants, and has a distinctive "feel", different from that of K-Y and related methylcellulose products. However, it is not recommended for use with latex condoms during sexual activity, as it increases the chance of rupture. In addition, petroleum jelly is difficult for the body to break down naturally, and may cause vaginal health problems when used for intercourse.

=== Product care and protection ===
==== Coating ====
Petroleum jelly can be used to coat corrosion-prone items such as metallic trinkets, non-stainless steel blades, and gun barrels prior to storage as it serves as an excellent and inexpensive water repellent. It is used as an environmentally friendly underwater antifouling coating for motor boats and sailing yachts. It was recommended in the Porsche owner's manual as a preservative for light alloy (alleny) anodized Fuchs wheels to protect them against corrosion from road salts and brake dust.

==== Finishing ====
It can be used to finish and protect wood, much like a mineral oil finish. It is used to condition and protect smooth leather products like bicycle saddles, boots, motorcycle clothing, and used to put a shine on patent leather shoes (when applied in a thin coat and then gently buffed off).

==== Lubrication ====
Petroleum jelly can be used to lubricate zippers and slide rules. It was also recommended by Porsche in maintenance training documentation for lubrication (after cleaning) of "Weatherstrips on Doors, Hood, Tailgate, Sun Roof". It is used in bullet lubricant compounds.

=== Industrial production processes ===
Petroleum jelly is a useful material when incorporated into candle wax formulas. It softens the overall blend, allows the candle to incorporate additional fragrance oil, and facilitates adhesion to the sidewall of the glass. Petroleum jelly is used to moisten nondrying modelling clay such as plasticine, as part of a mix of hydrocarbons including those with greater (paraffin wax) and lesser (mineral oil) molecular weights. It is used as a tack reducer additive to printing inks to reduce paper lint "picking" from uncalendered paper stocks. It can be used as a release agent for plaster molds and castings. It is used in the leather industry as a waterproofing cream.

=== Other ===
==== Explosives ====
Petroleum jelly can be mixed with a high proportion of strong inorganic chlorates due to it acting as a plasticizer and a fuel source. An example of this is Cheddite C which consists of a ratio of 9:1, KClO_{3} to petroleum jelly. This mixture is unable to detonate without the use of a blasting cap. It is also used as a stabiliser in the manufacture of the propellant Cordite.

==== Mechanical, barrier functions ====
Petroleum jelly can be used to fill copper or fiber-optic cables using plastic insulation to prevent the ingress of water, see icky-pick.

Petroleum jelly can be used to coat the inner walls of terrariums to prevent animals from crawling out to escape.

A stripe of petroleum jelly can be used to prevent the spread of a liquid (retain or confine a liquid to a specific area). For example, it can be applied close to the hairline when using a home hair dye kit to prevent the hair dye from irritating or staining the skin. It is also used to prevent diaper rash.

Petroleum jelly is sometimes used to protect the terminals on batteries. However, automobiles batteries require a silicone-based battery grease because it is less likely to melt and thus offers better protection.

==== Surface cleansing ====
Petroleum jelly is used to gently clean a variety of surfaces, ranging from makeup removal from faces to tar stain removal from leather.

==== Pet care ====
Petroleum jelly is used to moisturize the paws of dogs. It is a common ingredient in hairball remedies for domestic cats.

==== Sports ====
Some goalkeepers in association football put petroleum jelly on their gloves to make them stickier.

It is also used by cutmen in boxing and MMA on fighters' faces to prevent opponents' gloves from sticking to their skin, thus lessening the chance of cuts.

== Health ==
Petroleum jelly contains mineral oil aromatic hydrocarbons (MOAH). Many MOAH, mainly polycyclic aromatic hydrocarbons (PAH), are considered carcinogenic. The content of both MOAH and PAH in petroleum jelly products varies. The EU limits PAH content in cosmetics to 0.005%. The risks of PAH exposure through cosmetics have not been comprehensively studied, but food products with low levels (<3%) are not considered carcinogenic by the EU.

A 2012 scientific opinion by the European Food Safety Authority stated that mineral oil aromatic hydrocarbons (MOAH) and polyaromatics were potentially carcinogenic and may present a health risk.

In 2015, German consumer watchdog Stiftung Warentest analyzed cosmetics containing mineral oils, finding significant concentrations of MOAH and polyaromatics in products containing mineral oils. Vaseline products contained the most MOAH of all tested cosmetics (up to 9%). Based on the 2015 results, Stiftung Warentest warned consumers not to use Vaseline or any product that is based on mineral oils for lip care.

A study published in 2017 found levels of MOAH levels to be up to 1% in petroleum jelly and likewise to be less than 1% in petroleum jelly-based beauty products.
