= Ernest Soares =

British politician

Ernest Soares

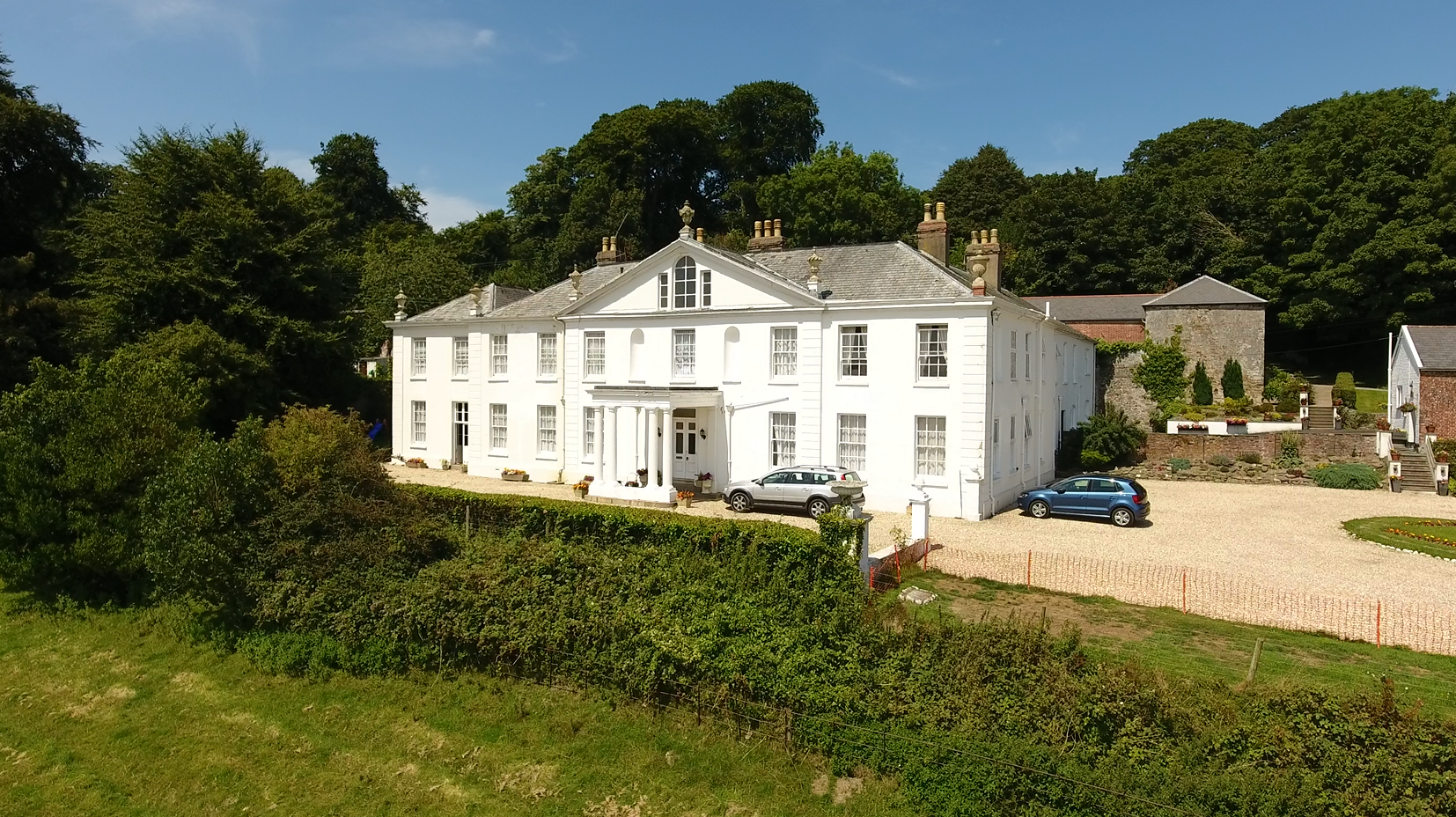
Upcott House in the parish of Pilton, near Barnstaple, Devon, residence of Soares from 1901 to pre-1917

Sir Ernest Joseph Soares (20 October 1864 – 15 March 1926) was a British solicitor and Liberal politician. He resided at 36 Princes Gate, London, and of Upcott House in the parish of Pilton, near Barnstaple in North Devon,

== Early life ==
Soares was the son of José Luís Xavier Soares, a Liverpool merchant, tracing his roots to Ucassaim, Portuguese Goa and Hannah Hollingsworth of Liverpool. Prior to conversion to Roman Catholicism, the family were Gaud Saraswat Brahmins (GSB) with the surname Gaitonde.

== Career ==
Electioneering hand bill used by Soares in defending his seat of Barnstaple in the January 1906 General Election

He was educated at St John's College, Cambridge, where he read law. He was a partner in Allen, Prestage and Soares, solicitors, of Manchester. In 1900 he was elected to the House of Commons for Barnstaple, and rented Upcott House, where he was resident in 1901, a large white stucco Georgian mansion one mile from the centre of Barnstaple and a prominent landmark for the voters and inhabitants of that town, from Sir William Robert Williams, 3rd Baronet of nearby Heanton Court. He served in the Liberal administration of H. H. Asquith as a Junior Lord of the Treasury from 1910 to 1911. The latter year failing health forced him to resign this post and his seat in the House of Commons. He was knighted the same year.

== Marriage and children ==
When Soares was working as a solicitor in Manchester and residing at Woodheys, on Washway Road, in Ashton upon Mersey (today Sale), he married Kate Carolyn Lord (1864-1932), daughter of his then near-neighbour Samuel Lord (1803-1889), the British-born American retail millionaire and founder of Lord & Taylor today the oldest luxury department store in the United States. Lord was born in Saddleworth, West Riding of Yorkshire, and emigrated to America in about 1821. Having retired from managing his retail empire, in 1866 he returned to England and resided at Oakleigh, on The Avenue in Ashton upon Mersey. Lord left nine million dollars (£1.848 million) at his death. By his wife Soares had one daughter and only child:

- Kate Rose Mary Soares (b. 1894), who married Captain Walter Bell (1880–1954), MC, known as Karamojo Bell, the Scottish adventurer and African big game hunter.

== Death ==
He died in Mayfair, London, in March 1926, at the age of 61.

Parliament of the United Kingdom
Preceded by Sir William Cameron Gull	Member of Parliament for Barnstaple; 1900 – 1911	Succeeded by Sir Godfrey Baring
Political offices
Preceded by John Henry Whitley; Oswald Partington; John Gulland	Junior Lord of the Treasury; 1910–1911; With: Oswald Partington 1910–1911; John Gulland 1910–1911; William Wedgwood Benn 1910–1911; Percy Illingworth 1910–1911; William Jones 1911	Succeeded by John Gulland; William Wedgwood Benn; Percy Illingworth; William Jones; Frederick Edward Guest
