= 1911 Barnstaple by-election =

UK parliamentary by-election

- 6 May 1911

Candidate	Baring	Parker
Party	Liberal	Liberal Unionist
Popular vote	6,239	5,751
Percentage	52.0%	48.0%
MP before election
Ernest Soares
Liberal
Subsequent MP
Sir Godfrey Baring
Liberal

The 1911 Barnstaple by-election was a Parliamentary by-election held on 6 May 1911. It returned one Member of Parliament (MP) to the House of Commons of the Parliament of the United Kingdom, elected by the first past the post voting system.

== Previous result ==
Ernest Soares

General election December 1910
Party	Candidate	Votes	%	±%
Liberal	Ernest Soares	6,047	54.0	+0.2
Liberal Unionist	Charles Sandbach Parker	5,155	46.0	−0.2
Majority		892	8.0	+0.4
Turnout		11,202	85.3	−3.0
Liberal hold		Swing	+0.2	

== Candidates ==
The Liberal candidate was Sir Godfrey Baring, a 40-year-old Eton educated former Liberal MP from the Isle of Wight. He had sat for the Isle of Wight from 1906 until his defeat in January 1910. At the December 1910 general election he had contested Devonport . He was the chairman of the Isle of Wight County Council.

The Unionist candidate was Charles Sandbach Parker, an Ayrshire-based 47-year-old Chairman and Managing Director of Demerara Co. who had been educated at Eton and Oxford. He had contested Barnstaple at the December 1910 general election.

== Result ==
The Liberal Party held the seat.

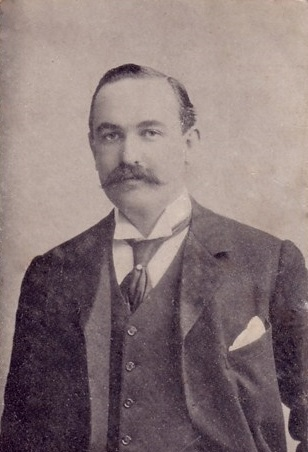
Godfrey Baring

1911 Barnstaple by-election
Party	Candidate	Votes	%	±%
Liberal	Godfrey Baring	6,239	52.0	−2.0
Liberal Unionist	Charles Sandbach Parker	5,751	48.0	+2.0
Majority		488	4.0	−4.0
Turnout		11,990	88.2	+2.9
Liberal hold		Swing	-2.0	

== Aftermath ==
Baring chose not to defend his seat and instead sought re-election for his old Isle of Wight seat.

General election 14 December 1918:
Party	Candidate	Votes	%	±%
Liberal	Tudor Rees	11,281	51.4	−0.6
Unionist	Charles Sandbach Parker	10,679	48.6	+0.6
Majority		602	2.8	−1.2
Turnout		21,960	69.1	−19.1
Liberal hold		Swing	-0.6	
