= Godfrey Baring =

British Liberal Member of Parliament (1871–1957)

Sir Godfrey Baring, 1st Baronet
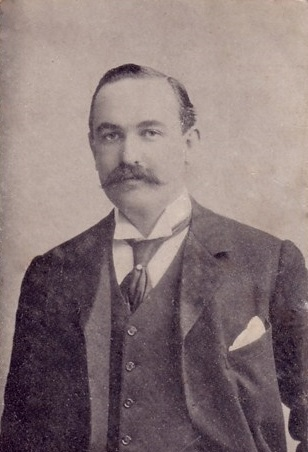
- Born: 18 April 1871
- Died: 24 November 1957 (aged 86)
- Occupation: Member of Parliament

Sir Godfrey Baring, 1st Baronet KBE, DL, JP (18 April 1871 – 24 November 1957) was a Liberal Member of Parliament for the Isle of Wight and later Barnstaple.

A member of the influential Baring family, he was the son of Lieutenant-General Charles Baring, son of Henry Bingham Baring, son of Henry Baring, third son of Sir Francis Baring, 1st Baronet. His mother was Helen Graham, daughter of Sir James Graham, 2nd Baronet. He was a lifelong resident of the Isle of Wight. He became involved in politics and public affairs at an early age: he was elected president of the Isle of Wight Liberal Union aged 23, was made a justice of the peace a year later and was High Sheriff of Hampshire in 1897 at the age of 26. In 1898 he became chairman of the Isle of Wight County Council, a position he held for the rest of his life.

A keen yachtsman, he was elected to the Royal Yacht Squadron in 1892. He frequently entertained royalty during Cowes Week at his residence, Nubia House.

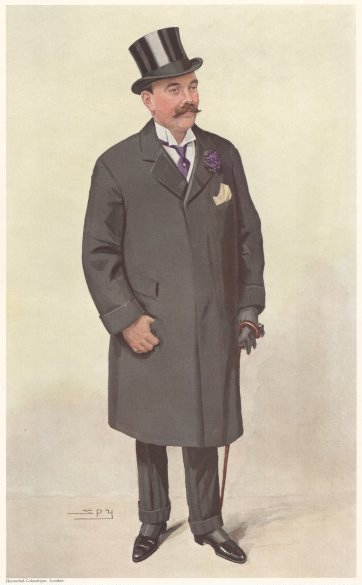
"Isle of Wight" Baring as caricatured by Spy (Leslie Ward) in Vanity Fair, September 1910

At the 1906 general election he was elected as member of parliament for the Isle of Wight, but lost the seat at the next election in January 1910. He was created a baronet, of Nubia House in the parish of Northwood in the Isle of Wight, on 4 February 1911. He returned to parliament in the same year when he was elected MP for Barnstaple at a by-election. At the 1918 general election, he sought to return to the House as member of parliament again for the Isle of Wight, but finished second.

For 33 years he was a member of the management committee of the Royal National Lifeboat Institution. In 1951, while he was president of the RNLI, the new lifeboat at Clacton was named Sir Godfrey Baring. He was made a Knight Commander of the Order of the British Empire in Elizabeth II's first birthday honours in 1952 for public services and in recognition of the fact that he had been "Chairman of the Isle of Wight County Council for over fifty years and Chairman of the Royal National Lifeboat Institution for twenty-seven years".

He married Eva Hermione Mackintosh. Helen Azalea "Poppy" Baring was his daughter.

Baring died on 24 November 1957, aged 86.

Parliament of the United Kingdom
Preceded by John Seely	Member of Parliament for Isle of Wight; 1906 – January 1910	Succeeded by Sir Douglas Hall
Preceded by Ernest Soares	Member of Parliament for Barnstaple; 1911 – 1918	Succeeded by Tudor Rees
Baronetage of the United Kingdom
New creation	Baronet (of Nubia House); 1911–1957	Succeeded by Charles Christian Baring
