= Samuel Lord =

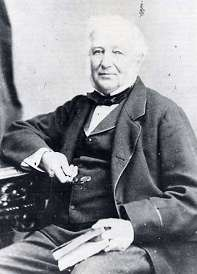
Samuel Lord (1803-1889)

Samuel Lord (1803-1889) was a British-born American retail millionaire who founded Lord & Taylor. It was the oldest luxury department store in the United States.

== Early life ==
Lord was born in Saddleworth, West Riding of Yorkshire, the youngest of five children and was left an orphan while young.

== Career ==
Lord served an apprenticeship in the trade of iron moulder, rising to be master of the craft. He worked in James Taylor's iron-foundry and in 1824 married Taylor's daughter and emigrated to America shortly thereafter. He borrowed $1,000 from his wife's uncle and in 1826 established a "dry goods" store at 47 Catherine Street in what is now Two Bridges, Manhattan, New York. In 1826 he was joined by his young wife and child, whom he had left in England.

His wife's cousin, George Washington Taylor, joined in 1834, and the store was named Lord & Taylor. James S. Taylor, Lord's brother-in-law, replaced George Taylor in 1845, and the store moved to Grand and Chrystie Streets in 1854. In 1870, the Broadway store moved a mile uptown, to a new cast-iron building at Broadway and 20th Street, in the area known as the "Ladies' Mile". The Lord & Taylor Building, the Starrett & van Vleck-designed Fifth Avenue store and headquarters opened between 38th and 39th streets on February 24, 1914.

== Retirement in England ==
Having retired in 1862 from managing his retail business, which he handed over to his two sons, in 1866 he returned to England and resided at Oakleigh, on The Avenue in Ashton upon Mersey, where he pursued his recreation of horticulture.

== Marriage and progeny ==
He married Mary Taylor and left progeny as follows:

- George Washington Taylor Lord (1837–1903), who with his brother succeeded his father in the business;
- Samuel Lord Jr. (died 1895), who with his brother succeeded his father in the business;
- Kate Lord, who married her father's near-neighbour Ernest Soares (1864-1926), then a solicitor in Manchester residing at Woodheys, (Note: Now "Woodheys Social Club") on Washway Road, in Ashton upon Mersey (today Sale), later a Liberal Member of Parliament for Barnstaple, Devon.
- Elizabeth Lord (1826 - 1906)

His second marriage was to Sarah Ann Bradbury.

== Death and burial ==
He died on 23 May 1889 in England and was buried in Brooklands Cemetery in Cheshire. Following an approach by local historian Michael Riley, the Lord & Taylor company refurbished at their sole cost Lord's impressive monument in the cemetery. Lord left nine million dollars (£1.848 million (Note: Lawrence H. Officer, "Dollar-Pound Exchange Rate From 1791," MeasuringWorth, 2017)) at his death. His will was proven at Chester on 15 July (resworn September 1893), with a personal estate valued at £495,141 6s. 1d. (equivalent to £55,010,383 in 2025).

== Notes and references ==
=== Further reading ===
- Biography of Samuel Lord in America's Successful Men of Affairs: An Encyclopedia of Contemporaneous Biography, New York, 1895, vol.1, p. 403
