= Lord & Taylor Building =

Commercial building in Manhattan, New York

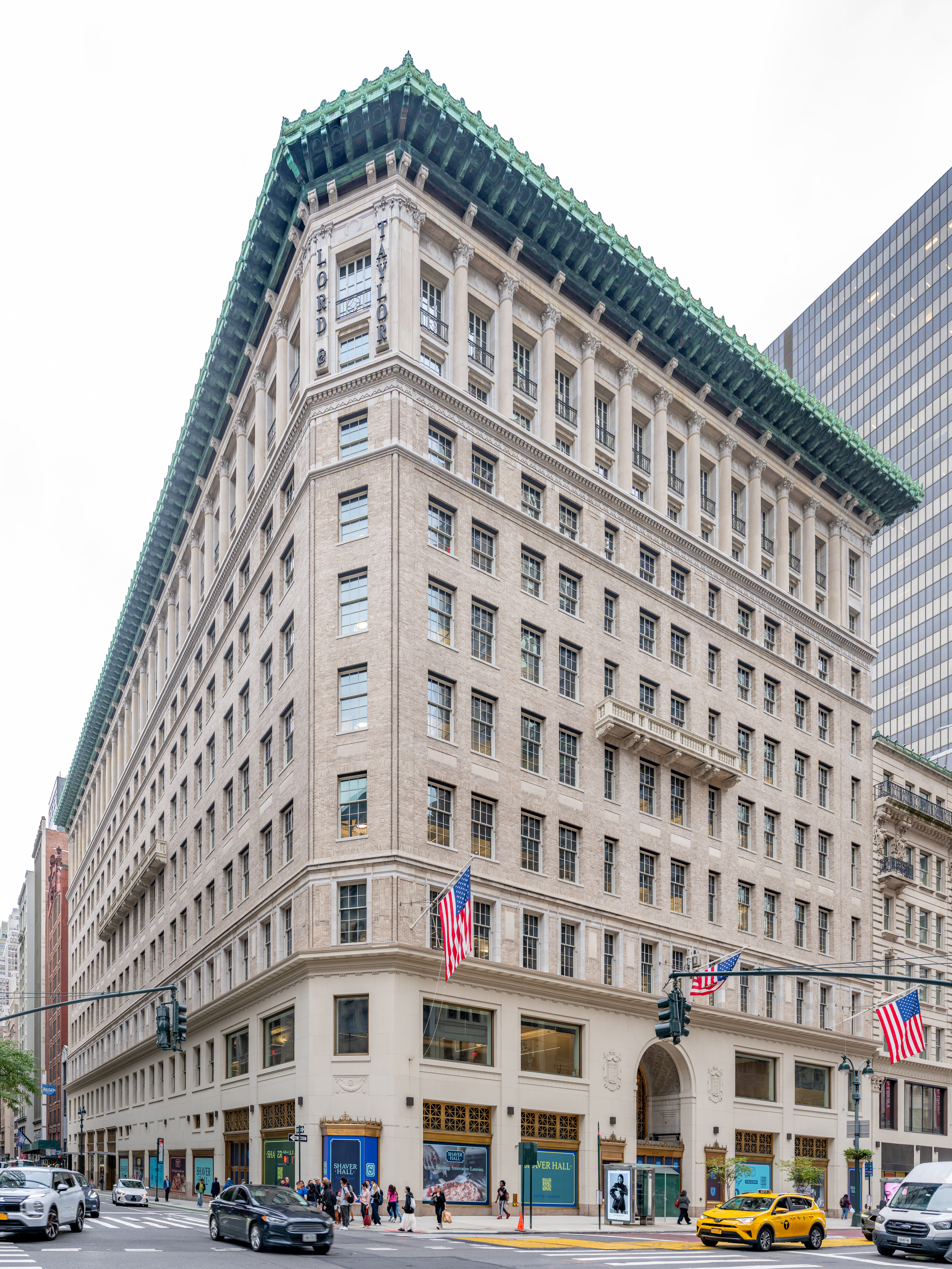
- (2025)
- Interactive map of the Lord & Taylor Building area

General information
- Architectural style: Italian Renaissance Revival
- Location: 424–434 Fifth Avenue, Manhattan, New York City, US
- Coordinates: 40°45′05″N 73°58′59″W
- Current tenants: Amazon.com
- Construction started: 1913
- Completed: 1914
- Owner: Amazon.com

Technical details
- Floor count: 11
- Floor area: 662,729 sq ft (61,569.5 m^{2})
- Lifts/elevators: 20

Design and construction
- Architect: Starrett and Van Vleck, Architects
- Main contractor: E. Brooks & Company Inc.

New York City Landmark
- Designated: October 30, 2007
- Reference no.: 2271

The Lord & Taylor Building is an 11-story commercial building in Midtown Manhattan, New York City, that formerly served as Lord & Taylor's flagship department store in the city. Designed by Starrett & van Vleck in the Italian Renaissance Revival style, it is at 424–434 Fifth Avenue between 38th and 39th Streets. Since 2023, it has been an office building for Amazon.

The building's facade is made of limestone on the lower stories and gray brick on the upper stories, capped by a copper cornice. The structure contains a chamfered corner at the intersection of Fifth Avenue and 38th Street, and it wraps around another building at Fifth Avenue and 39th Street. The store had multiple entrances, including a barrel-vaulted arch on Fifth Avenue The building was designed with several features that enabled the store to function efficiently, such as delivery ramps and movable window displays on elevators. The above-ground floors were connected via various elevators and stairs; there were no retail areas on the tenth floor.

The building was constructed from 1913 to 1914 and served as Lord & Taylor's flagship store for over a hundred years. It was described as the first "frankly commercial" structure on Fifth Avenue north of 34th Street, and it replaced several of the company's previous headquarters. During the building's operation as Lord & Taylor's flagship store, it was renovated several times, and by the late 20th century, the store had expanded into an adjacent building. The Lord & Taylor Building was designated a city landmark by the New York City Landmarks Preservation Commission on October 30, 2007. The building was mostly sold in a joint venture to workspace company WeWork in 2019. Amazon acquired the building in 2020, and opened an office there in mid-2023, so Lord & Taylor is officially gone after almost 200 years of business.

== Site ==
The Lord & Taylor Building is located on an L-shaped lot at 424–434 Fifth Avenue between West 38th and 39th Streets in Midtown Manhattan. Its frontage totals about 260 feet (79 m) to the south on 38th Street, 200 feet (61 m) to the west, 160 feet (49 m) to the north on 39th Street, and 150 feet (46 m) to the east on Fifth Avenue. The lot wraps around the Dreicer Building, erected on a holdout lot at 39th Street and Fifth Avenue, which was separately owned when the Lord & Taylor Building was erected. The holdout lot's owner had refused to sell the land, and the Dreicer Building was ultimately combined with the Lord & Taylor Building after 1992.

== Architecture ==
The 11-story Lord & Taylor Building was designed by Starrett & van Vleck in the Italian Renaissance Revival style. The total square footage of the building exceeds 600,000 square feet (56,000 m^{2}) and includes two basement levels and ten above-ground levels.

=== Facade ===
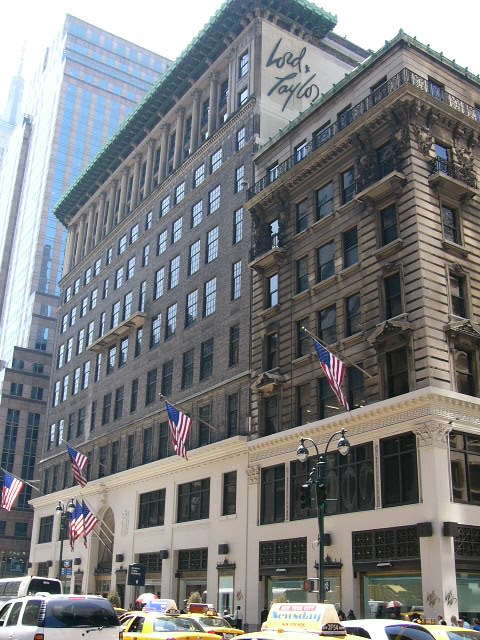
Seen from Fifth Avenue north of 39th Street, with the "holdout" building in front of the Lord & Taylor Building

The 10-story facade of the building is split into three layers: the two-story limestone base, the brick-bonded facade of the third through eighth floors, and the terracotta-faced ninth and tenth floors. The ninth- and tenth-floor facade is designed to look like a colonnade with the windows located in recessed bays between the "columns" of the colonnade. These "columns" are spaced at intervals of 22 feet (6.7 m). The chamfered corner at Fifth Avenue and 38th Street, which intersects at a 45-degree angle with each facade, is a visual element that unites the Fifth Avenue and 38th Street elevations. The chamfer is clad with terracotta below the eighth floor and blends with the colonnade wrapping around the ninth- and tenth-floor facades. The section of the facade that wraps around the holdout lot is windowless and undecorated.

Decorative elements were used sparingly on the facade. These included the two-story coffer-vaulted main entrance on Fifth Avenue, the balustrade and balconies on the facade, the ninth- and tenth-floor colonnade, and the copper cornice on the facade above the tenth floor. The main entrance was spanned by an arch topped by an elaborately decorated keystone, while cartouches and other decorations were present in other parts of the entrance vestibule. "Multi-light windows" were added on the third through tenth floors, deviating from the plate glass windows typically used in retail buildings, which one critic said "added much to the appearance of the openings". In addition to the main entrance, there were smaller side entrances on 38th and 39th Streets.

Travertine was used for the surface of the first floor. Cork surfaces were incorporated into the selling counters to reduce strain on employees who leaned on the counters. Wood was also used in the decorative features and on the fifth floor, where there was originally a carpet department.

=== Features ===
The building was designed with several features that enabled the store to function efficiently. For instance, ramps led from 38th and 39th Streets to a receiving/delivery dock in the building's basement, obviating the need for delivery trucks to load and unload cargo on the street. Additionally, the displays in the store's front windows were located on small elevators, which could be lowered into the basement whenever the displays had to be changed. There were several conveyor systems and dumbwaiters that could move products from the basement to the shipping department or customers. A packaging department was located on the eighth floor.

The above-ground floors were connected via 20 passenger elevators, seven staircases, and numerous freight elevators and conveyor systems. Lord & Taylor was considered the first department store to have installed elevators, though it is unclear whether the Fifth Avenue flagship was the first Lord & Taylor store with elevators. On the walls outside the passenger elevator landings on each floor, there were lighted arrows that indicated each elevator's direction of travel; at the time of the building's construction, this was still an uncommon feature.

There were no retail areas on the tenth floor, which instead contained a food court with restaurants that could collectively seat 500 people. The dining areas were named after their theming: the Adam style Wedgewood Room, the Chinese-themed Mandarin Room, and the Italian villa-themed Loggia. Other customer amenities included a concert hall within the seventh-floor music department, and restrooms, telephones, and travel counters on the fifth floor. There was also a "manicure parlor for men" as well as a mechanical horse ride. Employee amenities were also built into the design of the building. There was a gym, solarium, and dental and medical departments on the 11th floor, while other floors contained dining rooms and a men's smoking area. A plaque, commemorating 68 Lord & Taylor employees who died in wars, was hung on the wall just inside the entrance. After Amazon renovated the building in 2023, it contained a dog run, dining room, and roof terrace. In addition, Amazon added a food hall named Shaver Hall, which was designed by Icrave and included wood decorations, metallic accents, and jewel-like colors.

== History ==
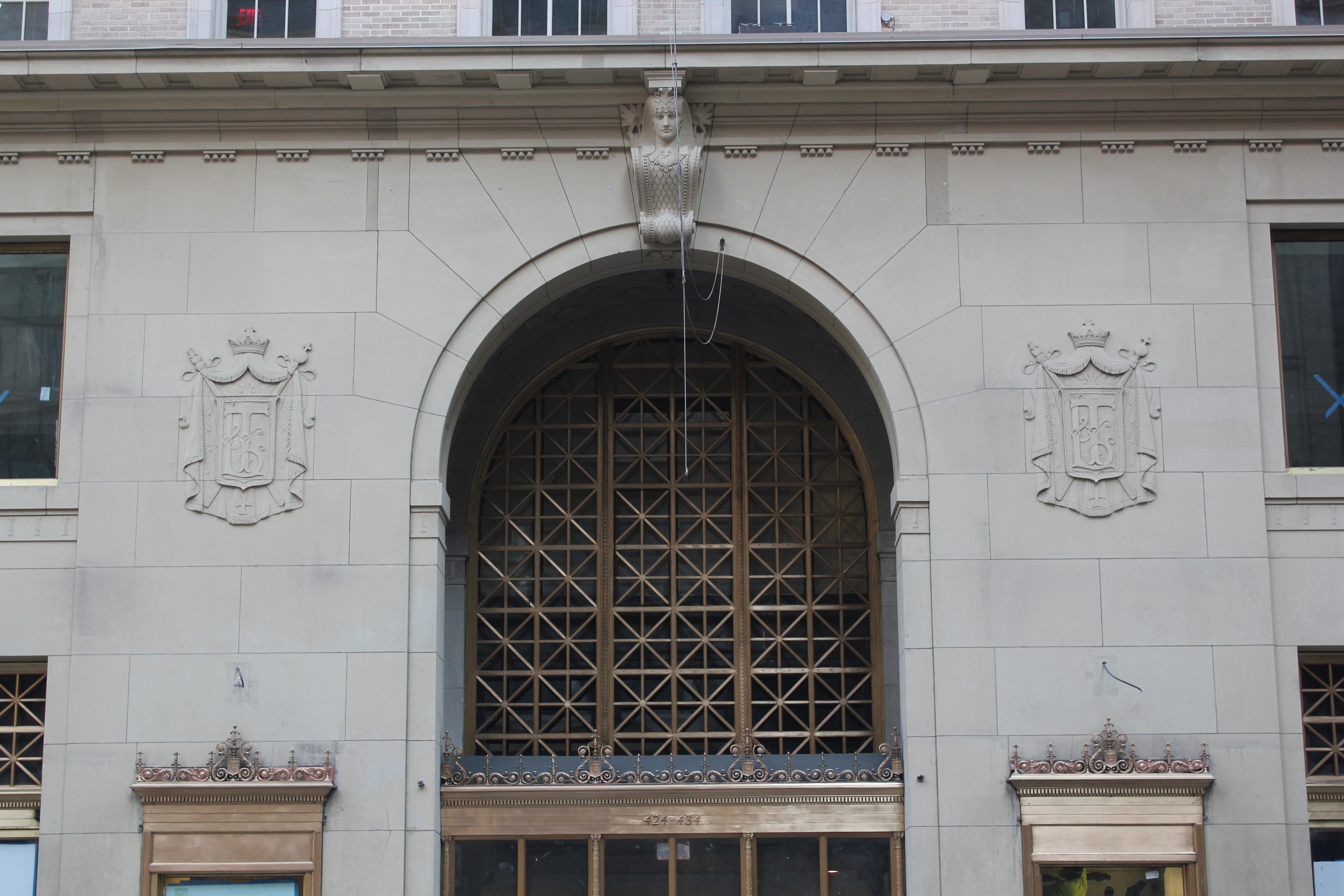
Entrance arch on Fifth Avenue

In 1826, English immigrant Samuel Lord founded the original Lord & Taylor store at 47 Catherine Street in what is now Two Bridges in Lower Manhattan. The original Lord & Taylor moved several times, opening new flagship stores at Broadway and Grand Street within SoHo in 1859, and then at Broadway and 20th Street in the "Ladies' Mile" area in 1870. After a period of economic decline and growth, the company opened stores along Fifth Avenue in 1903 and 1906, becoming one of the avenue's first retailers.

Meanwhile, the residential core of Manhattan relocated north from lower Manhattan during the late 19th century. Many stores established in the 1850s and 1860s were located along Broadway south of 14th Street, including the Grand Street flagship store of Lord & Taylor. By the 1870s, stores were being established between 14th and 23rd Streets in the Ladies' Mile area, including the Lord & Taylor Building at 901 Broadway. At the beginning of the 20th century, development was centered on Fifth Avenue north of 34th Street, where new department store buildings were quickly replacing the street's brownstones. The first of these was the B. Altman and Company Building, which opened in 1906.

=== Relocation and opening ===
Edward Hatch, a partner in Lord & Taylor, and his grandson Wilson Hatch Tucker decided to look for a new location for Lord & Taylor's headquarters in 1909. A site abutting the western sidewalk of Fifth Avenue, running from West 38th to 39th Streets, was leased from the Burton brothers in October 1912. The site measured 260 feet (79 m) on 38th Street by 200 feet (61 m) deep, but excluded a holdout lot at the site's northwest corner, at 39th Street. Starrett & van Vleck were announced as the architects, while the structure was erected by E. Brooks & Company Inc. At the time, the store was planned to open at the beginning of 1914. An old home on the site was torn down at the end of 1912, and construction was well underway by the middle of the following year.

The Lord & Taylor Building opened on February 24, 1914, and the Broadway store was sold a month later, on March 26. The new building had cost more than estimated, and Lord & Taylor announced in November 1915 that it would sell off its wholesale business because of a lack of funding.

=== 20th century ===
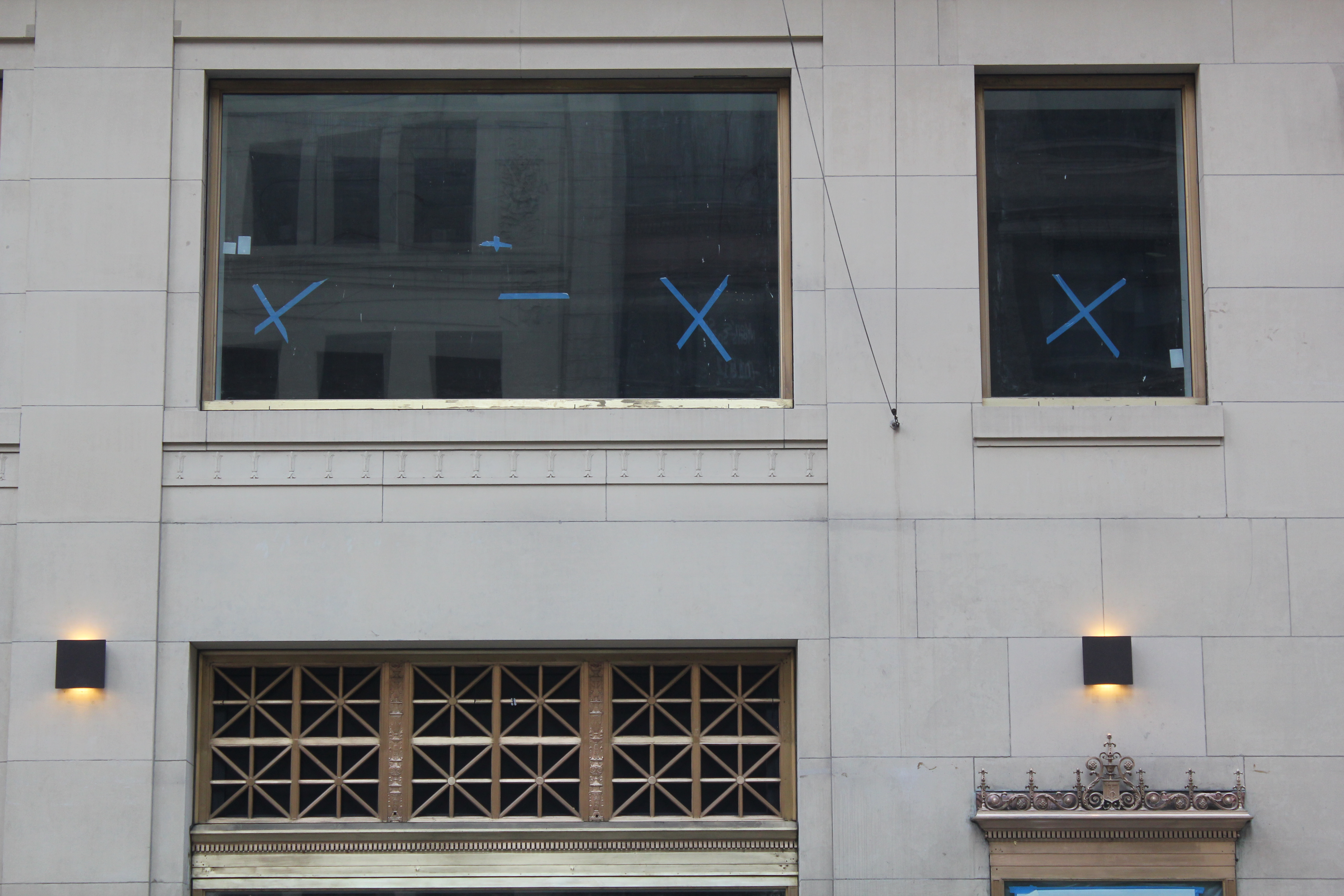
Ground-story window grille and second-story window

Dorothy Shaver, a full-time employee at Lord & Taylor since 1924, became its president in 1945, making her the first woman in the United States to head a multimillion-dollar firm. Under her tenure, the Lord & Taylor Building was expanded to include several specialty and clothing departments, and Lord & Taylor became the first U.S. department store to include such divisions. The fourth floor was renovated to accommodate an older women's clothing department, reopening in March 1938. That September, the renovated third floor opened to the public with divisions for dresses, millinery, and suits and coats. The third floor used colored furniture to contrast with gray walls; several mirrors for customers to quickly preview garments; and narrow entrances that drew customers' attention to the rear sections of the department, rather than to the items near the entrances. According to The New York Times, these additions were "deliberately violating several cardinal principles of store layout". The redesign was planned by Raymond Loewy, who also designed the lamp and gift departments on the ninth floor, the girls' departments, the Men's Budget Shop, and the ground-floor stationery department.

The company expanded to its first branch location in 1941, but the main building on Fifth Avenue continued to serve as Lord & Taylor's flagship store and headquarters. In November 1938, an atypically warm month for the city, the company was involved in a dispute with the Fifth Avenue Association over a window display that did not display any merchandise, but instead depicted a blizzard with a sign stating "It's coming! Sooner or later!". The display supposedly went against a ban on "cheap trinket shops", and the company took down the displays before later putting them back up.

In January 1976, it was announced that five of the building's floors, including the main floor, would be remodeled with mirrored glass on the columns and walls, as well as travertine sales counters. The renovation was completed that September, at which point Lord & Taylor CEO Joseph E. Brooks announced that the branches would receive similar renovations. Starting in 1979 during the Iran hostage crisis, the store played The Star-Spangled Banner (the U.S. national anthem) each morning before opening. The tradition was implemented because Lord & Taylor's chairman at the time wanted to send the message that the U.S. was "the greatest country in the world". In 1986, Lord & Taylor's parent company signed a lease for the Dreicer Building, the "holdout" building at Fifth Avenue and 39th Street. The store was later expanded into the Dreicer Building.

=== 21st century ===
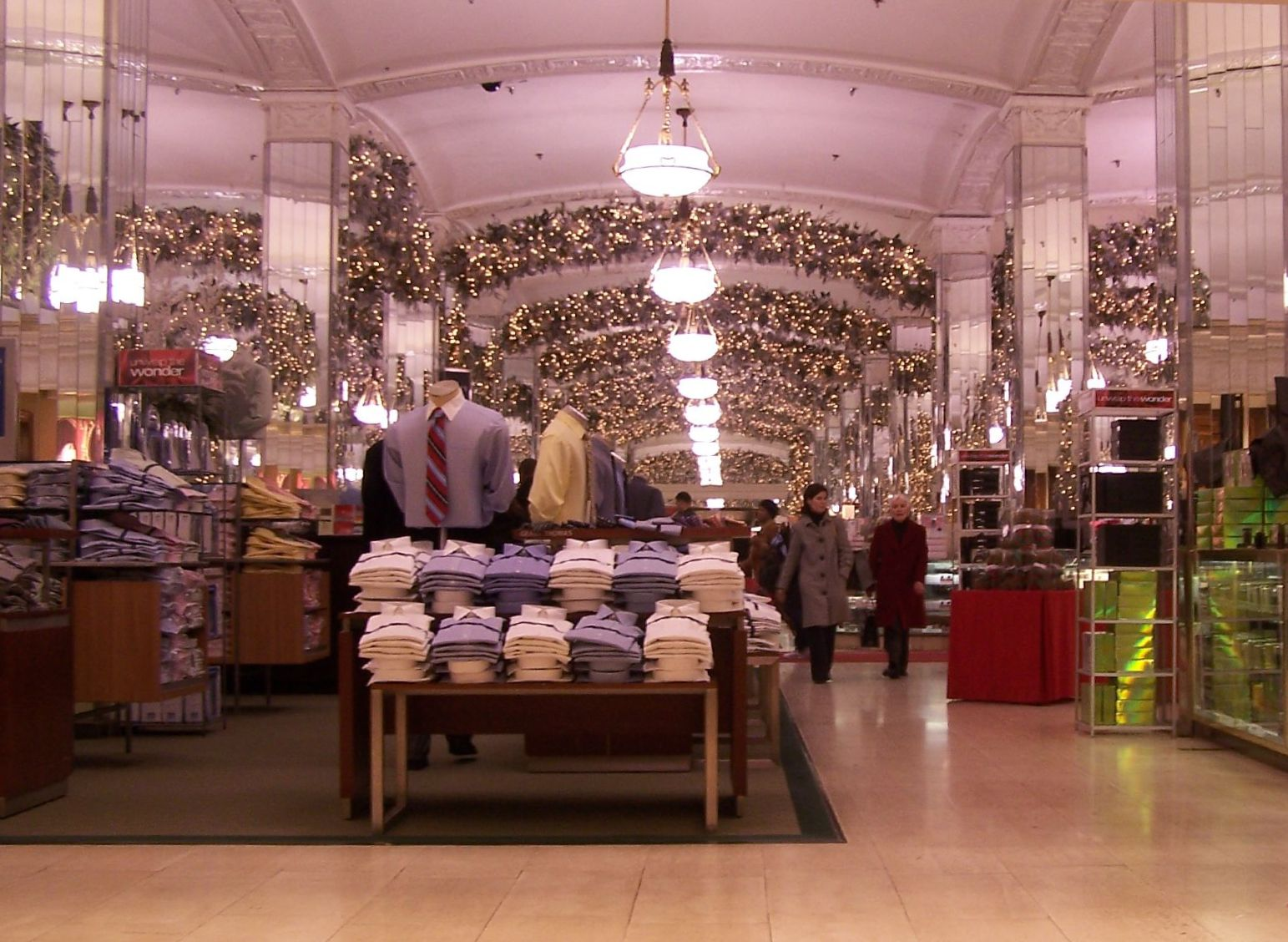
The interior, seen in 2006

New windows were added in 2003. In 2006, Lord & Taylor was sold to Federated Department Stores (now Macy's, Inc.). The building was made a New York City designated landmark on October 30, 2007. Most of the floors were extensively remodeled in 2009–2010 after Hudson's Bay Company pledged to spend $150 million on upgrades. The beauty level received brighter lighting and a new chandelier; and several windows that were previously located in storage rooms were incorporated into the publicly accessible space.

==== Sale to WeWork ====
Plans to add a large skyscraper above the store were discussed in April 2017. That October, it was reported the company planned to sell the Fifth Avenue flagship and headquarters as part of a joint venture with WeWork for a reported $850 million. WeWork was set to occupy the uppermost floors of the building, with the rest of the building remaining a flagship space for Lord & Taylor. Lord & Taylor shuttered in January 2019 for construction which was to begin in the next month. Lord & Taylor's parent company subsequently subleased space at 275 Madison Avenue. The building's sale to WeWork was officially finalized in February 2019. As part of the final transaction, WeWork converted $125 million of the purchase price into equity, forming the joint venture for the building's ownership.

==== Resale to Amazon ====
In June 2019, technology company Amazon expressed interest in renting out almost the entire building from WeWork. At the time, WeWork was spending $438 million to renovate the Lord & Taylor Building. By that October, the Lord & Taylor Building had become a burden for WeWork. Controversies had led to the company's initial public offering being withdrawn the previous month, and WeWork had paid $105 per square foot ($1,130/m^{2}) per square foot for the building, substantially more than the average price of $80 per square foot ($860/m^{2}) for comparable office space in the area.

Amazon purchased the building in February 2020 for $978 million, and the acquisition was finalized the following month. That August, Amazon announced that up to 2,000 employees in the company's advertising, music, video, and fashion divisions would start working in the building in 2023. These plans had been finalized before the start of the COVID-19 pandemic in New York City in early 2020, which had caused an increase in remote work, but Amazon proceeded with the original plans, made extensive renovations, and gave it the nickname Hank (after the unit of yarn). Amazon employees began relocating into the building in mid-2023 and formally opened its offices there that September. At the time, the company planned to have 2,000 employees working at the Lord & Taylor Building by the following year. The Food Hall Company announced in 2024 that it would open a food court at the Lord & Taylor Building, to be known as Shaver Hall after Lord & Taylor's first female president, Dorothy Shaver. The new 35,000-square-foot (3,300 m^{2}) food hall on the bottom floor of the building opened in June 2026.

== Critical reception ==
Upon the building's completion, its design was lauded by Architecture magazine as a public "gift and a benefit". In the 1939 WPA Guide to New York City, the Federal Writers' Project described the Lord & Taylor Building's construction as being "a break with tradition" and that "the avenue now had a building that was frankly commercial as well as dignified". Upon the sale of the building in 2017, a New York Times reporter wrote that the move was "a story of the new economy cannibalizing the old".

== See also ==
- List of New York City Designated Landmarks in Manhattan from 14th to 59th Streets
