= Lord & Taylor =

American department store

Coordinates: 40.75149°N 73.98307°W

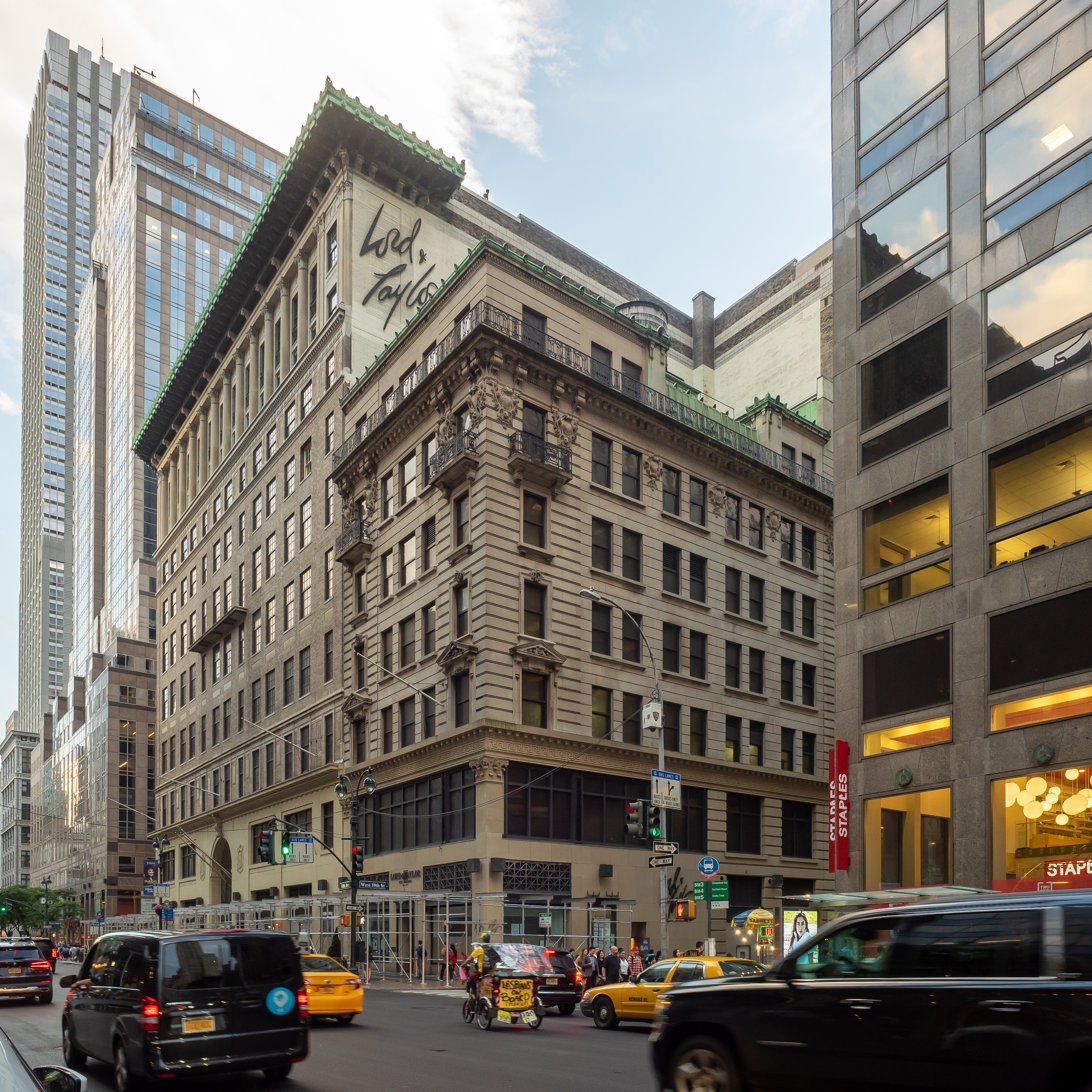
- Exterior of the Lord & Taylor Building flagship store on Fifth Avenue in New York City (2019)
- Type: Subsidiary
- Industry: Retail
- Genre: Department stores
- Founded: 1826; 200 years ago in New York City, New York, United States
- Founder: Samuel Lord; George Washington Taylor
- Defunct: 2021; 5 years ago (brick-and-mortar stores only)
- Fate: Chapter 11 bankruptcy liquidation
- Parent: Associated Dry Goods (1916–1986); The May Department Stores Company (1986–2005); Federated Department Stores (2005–2006); NRDC Equity Partners (2006–2008); Hudson's Bay Trading Company (2008–2012); Hudson's Bay Company (2012–2019); Le Tote (2019–2020); Saadia Group (2020–2024); Regal Brands Global (2024–present)
- Website: lordandtaylor.com

Lord & Taylor is an American online department store founded in 1826 by Samuel Lord and George Washington Taylor. Until 2021, Lord & Taylor operated brick-and-mortar stores, operating 86 locations around the United States at its peak in the 2000s. The flagship store was located on Fifth Avenue in the Midtown Manhattan district of New York City, operating from 1914 until 2019.

The company declared bankruptcy in 2020 and shuttered all physical stores and online operations in 2021. Lord & Taylor's intellectual property was sold to Saadia Group, who relaunched it as an online department store in 2021. In 2024, Saadia Group's assets were seized by court order and the intellectual property of Lord & Taylor was sold to Regal Brands Global. Regal Brands Global relaunched the Lord & Taylor e-commerce business in 2025.

== History ==
=== Under the Lord family, 1826–1916 ===
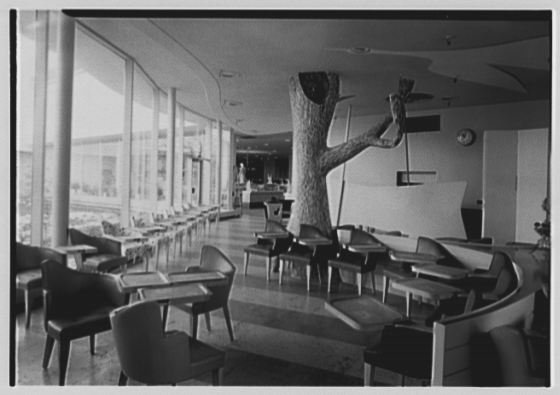
The Scarsdale, New York Birdcage restaurant in 1948

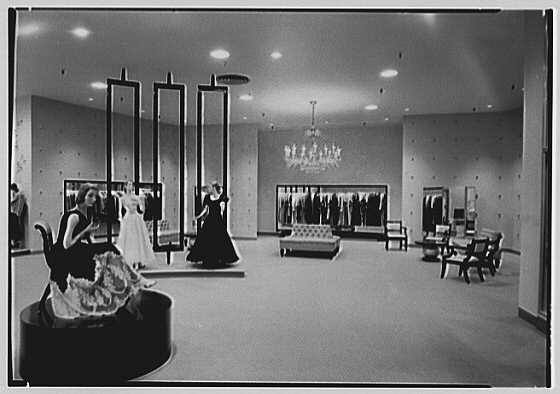
The Scarsdale, New York store in 1948

English-born Samuel Lord started a dry goods business in New York City in 1824 and opened the original store that would become Lord & Taylor in 1826, on Catherine Street in what is now Two Bridges, Manhattan. The shop stocked hosiery, misses' wear, and cashmere shawls. His wife's cousin, George Washington Taylor, joined in 1834, and the store was named Lord & Taylor. The store continued to grow: it annexed 49 Catherine Street in 1832 and moved six years later to 61–63 Catherine Street. James S. Taylor, Lord's brother-in-law, replaced George Taylor in 1845. The company erected a new building at Grand and Chrystie Streets in 1853 and moved into that location the following year. Lord later named his son John T. Lord and his employee John S. Lyle as partners in the enterprise.

On August 29, 1859, Lord & Taylor opened a second store on Broadway at Grand Street in the modern-day SoHo neighborhood, keeping the older store open. The new store was described as a "five-story marble emporium" and was among Broadway's first major new department stores since the A.T. Stewart building at 280 Broadway was completed in 1846. At the same time, Lord & Taylor started participating in wholesaling. Lord retired in 1862. Samuel Lord Jr. and George Washington Taylor Lord succeeded the original partners in leading the company.

In 1870, the Broadway store moved uptown to a new cast-iron building at Broadway and 20th Street, in the area known as the "Ladies' Mile". This store was designed by James H. Giles and included one of the first steam-powered passenger elevators. The new store expanded around 1890 by annexing a building to the east. Lord & Taylor faced economic troubles after the Panic of 1873, though the original partners gave the company "a large loan" in 1879. By 1894, the company was fast-growing and would open stores on Fifth Avenue in 1903 and 1906. The downtown store continued to function, expanded through to Forsyth Street and advertised until at least 1887 as a new building. Samuel Lord's estate sold the Grand Street store in 1901.

The Lord & Taylor Building, the Starrett & van Vleck-designed Fifth Avenue store opened between 38th and 39th streets on February 24, 1914. It touted many modern improvements, including an electric delivery vehicle garage; elevator and hidden conveyor systems for moving goods, people, showcases, and trash, and for loading and unloading trucks; and an on-site electrical generation and heating system. The Broadway store was quickly sold after the new store opened on March 26. The new store became a New York City Landmark on October 30, 2007.

Lord & Taylor announced in November 1915 that it would sell off its wholesale business.

=== Under Associated Dry Goods, 1916–1986 ===
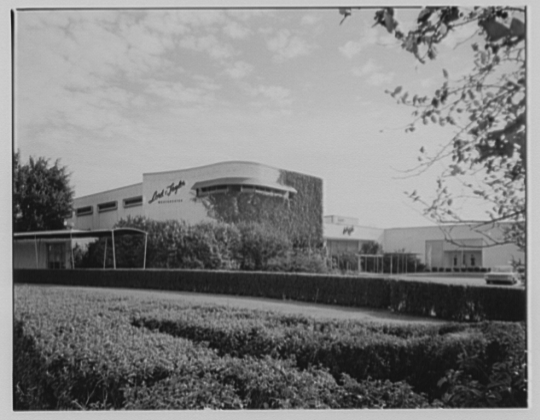
The Scarsdale, New York store in 1961

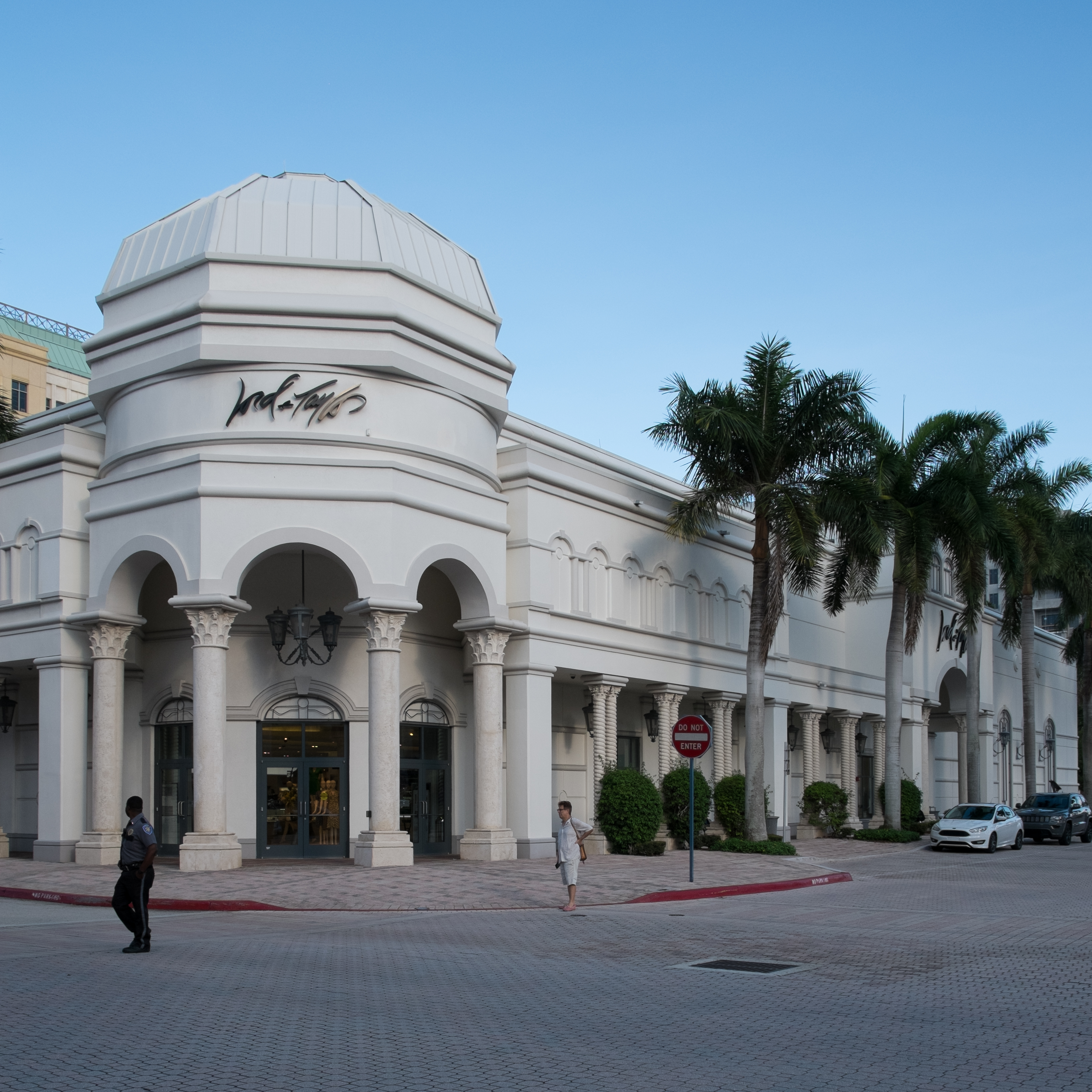
The Mizner Park store in Boca Raton, Florida, in 2019

A founding unit of Associated Dry Goods, Lord & Taylor was considered to be its crown jewel.

In 1945, Dorothy Shaver became the first woman to head a major retail establishment in the United States as president of Lord & Taylor. As vice president working with the well-known design firm of Raymond Loewy Associates, she opened what is credited as the first-ever branch store, in Manhasset, New York. Unlike earlier forays into the suburbs that consisted of smaller boutique-style shops, this merchandising effort became the model for modern suburban shopping. The store consisted of 66 individual shops. Lord & Taylor's relationship with Raymond Loewy Associates continued until 1969, following the construction of the Stamford, Connecticut store (designed by Loewy Vice President Andrew Geller). Many of Lord & Taylor's special services, including personal shoppers, were introduced while Shaver presided. During this period she introduced the Andrew Geller handwritten logo and the American Beauty Rose as icons of the store. Shaver died in 1959.

William J. Lippincott was elected chairman and chief executive in 1972. His obituary in The New York Times read: "In his years as president and chairman, Lord & Taylor moved beyond its traditional territory in the northeast to open stores in Atlanta, Houston, and Dallas and four stores in Illinois." A management shakeup ousted him in 1976.

Under the leadership of CEO Joseph E. Brooks during the 1970s, the company aggressively expanded into Texas, Illinois, and Michigan; throughout the 1980s, South Florida saw 11 stores opened in quick succession.

=== Under May Company and Federated Department Stores, 1986–2006 ===
When the May Company acquired ADG in 1986, it was assumed that May bought it just for the luxury division.

The chain partially withdrew from the oil-shocked Texas and southern Florida markets in 1989–1990 after its 1986 acquisition by May. Under May, the upscale Hahne & Co., Wanamaker's, and Woodward & Lothrop chains were repositioned and converted into Lord & Taylor.

Jane T. Elfers became Lord & Taylor's second female president in June 2000. Former Neiman Marcus executive, Brendan Hoffman replaced her in October 2008, when Elfer's contract had expired. A third female president, Bonnie Brooks, took over in 2011, and a fourth female president, Liz Rodbell, took over in 2013.

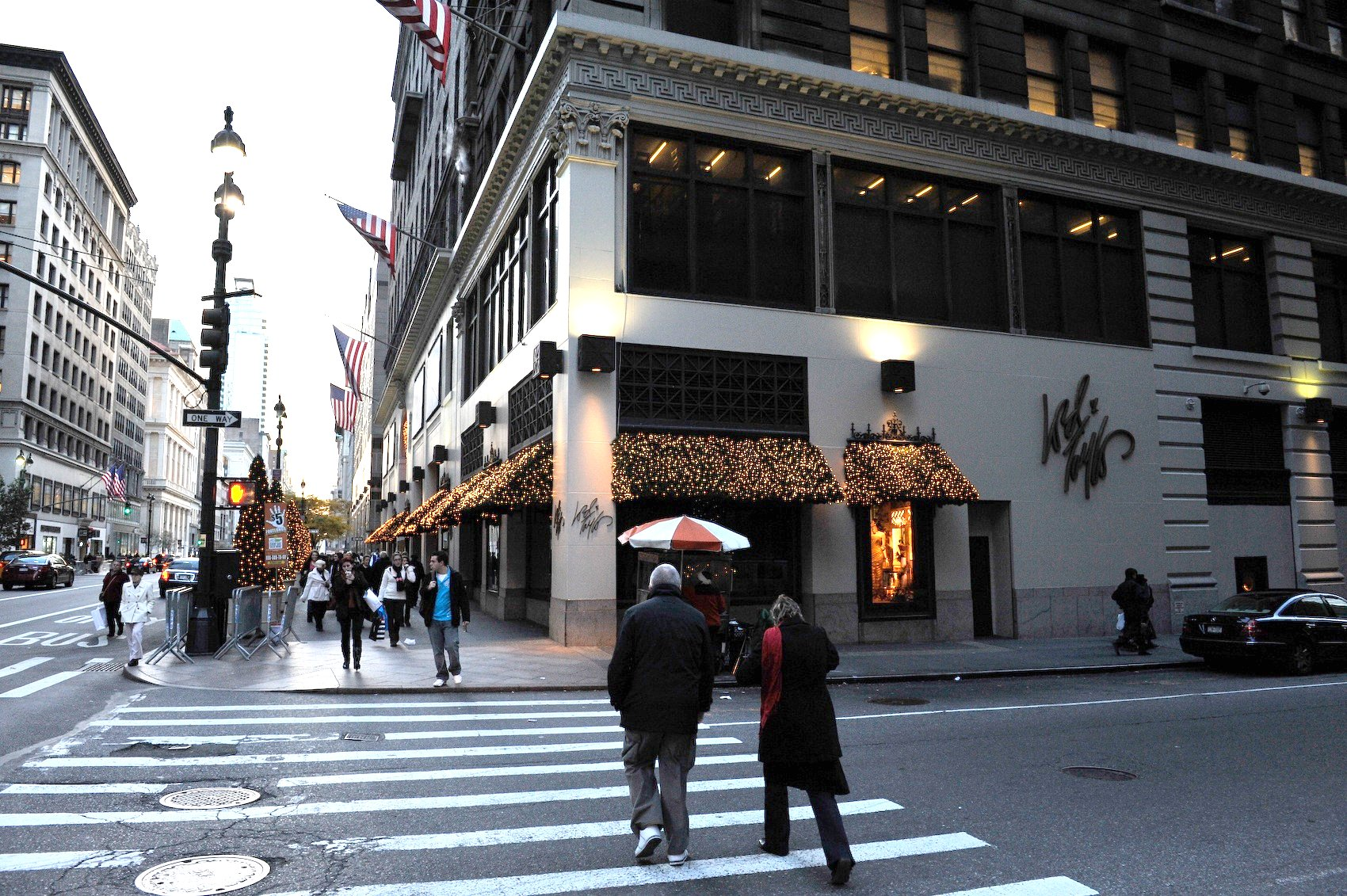
The Lord & Taylor Building flagship store on Fifth Avenue in 2008

Federated Department Stores acquired May Department Stores in 2005. On January 12, 2006, Federated chairman, president, and CEO Terry Lundgren announced that Lord & Taylor would be sold by the end of the year. Federated announced on March 10, 2006, that six Lord & Taylor locations would be sold or downscale into Macy's. The legendary Center City, Philadelphia store, the former flagship of the John Wanamaker chain, opened after a one-month renovation as Macy's City Center on August 1, 2006.

=== Under NRDC Equity Partners and Hudson's Bay, 2006–2019 ===
On June 22, 2006, NRDC Equity Partners, LLC announced it would purchase Lord & Taylor for $1.2 billion after Federated converted and sold the previously announced locations; the sale was completed in October 2006. Federated continued to service Lord & Taylor consumer credit accounts in an agreement with NRDC under the terms of its sale until mid-2007.

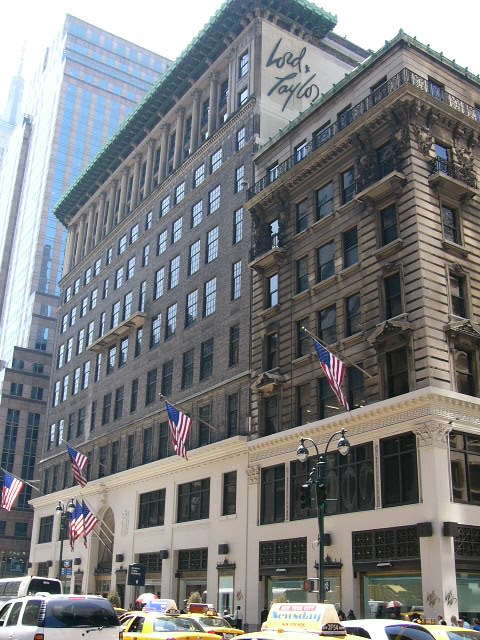
The Lord & Taylor Building at 424 Fifth Avenue

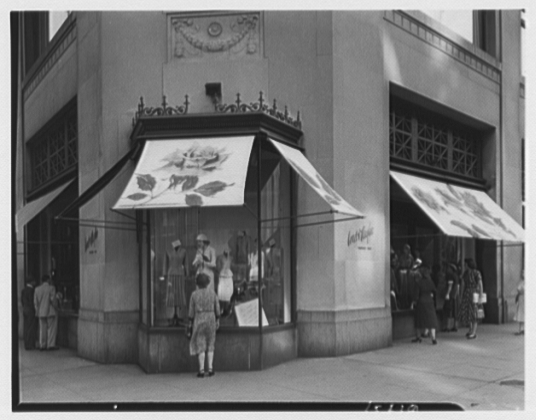
The Fifth Avenue flagship store in 1952

On July 16, 2008, NRDC Equity Partners announced that it had purchased the 338-year-old Hudson's Bay Company (HBC). Lord & Taylor was initially positioned as a sister company of HBC under Hudson's Bay Trading Company but became a subsidiary of HBC in 2012.

The Fifth Avenue flagship store received a $150 million ($216 million in 2025) update in 2010. In 2011, an ultra-modern concept store opened in Westchester County at the new Ridge Hill Mall. During this time, locations such as Manhasset, Garden City, Bala Cynwyd, Eastchester, and Stamford all saw ultra-modern style renovations and upgrades. In 2012, a large outpost opened at The Mall at Rockingham Park. In 2013, a contemporary-style outpost opened at Mizner Park in Boca Raton, Florida. In 2014, a contemporary outpost, modeled after the Boca Raton location, opened at Crossgates Mall near Albany, NY. Around this time, a store was announced to open alongside Saks Fifth Avenue in the luxury wing of the American Dream Mall.

In 2015, Lord & Taylor launched Design Lab, a line of apparel for women aged 18 to 35. The advertising campaign, which concentrated on a single dress, made extensive use of social media, including a paid article in Nylon and posts on Instagram by fashion influencers who were paid for their posts and had received the dress for free. The advertised dress sold out, however the campaign was investigated by the Federal Trade Commission (FTC). In 2016, Lord & Taylor agreed to a settlement with the FTC which stated that it is "prohibited from misrepresenting paid ads as independent editorial content, and it must clearly disclose when fashion influencers have received some form of compensation for their endorsement".

The combined HBC, as of February 2017, consisted of Lord & Taylor and Saks Fifth Avenue in the United States, the online luxury fashion retailer Gilt, Hudson's Bay and Home Outfitters in Canada, and Galeria Kaufhof in Germany.

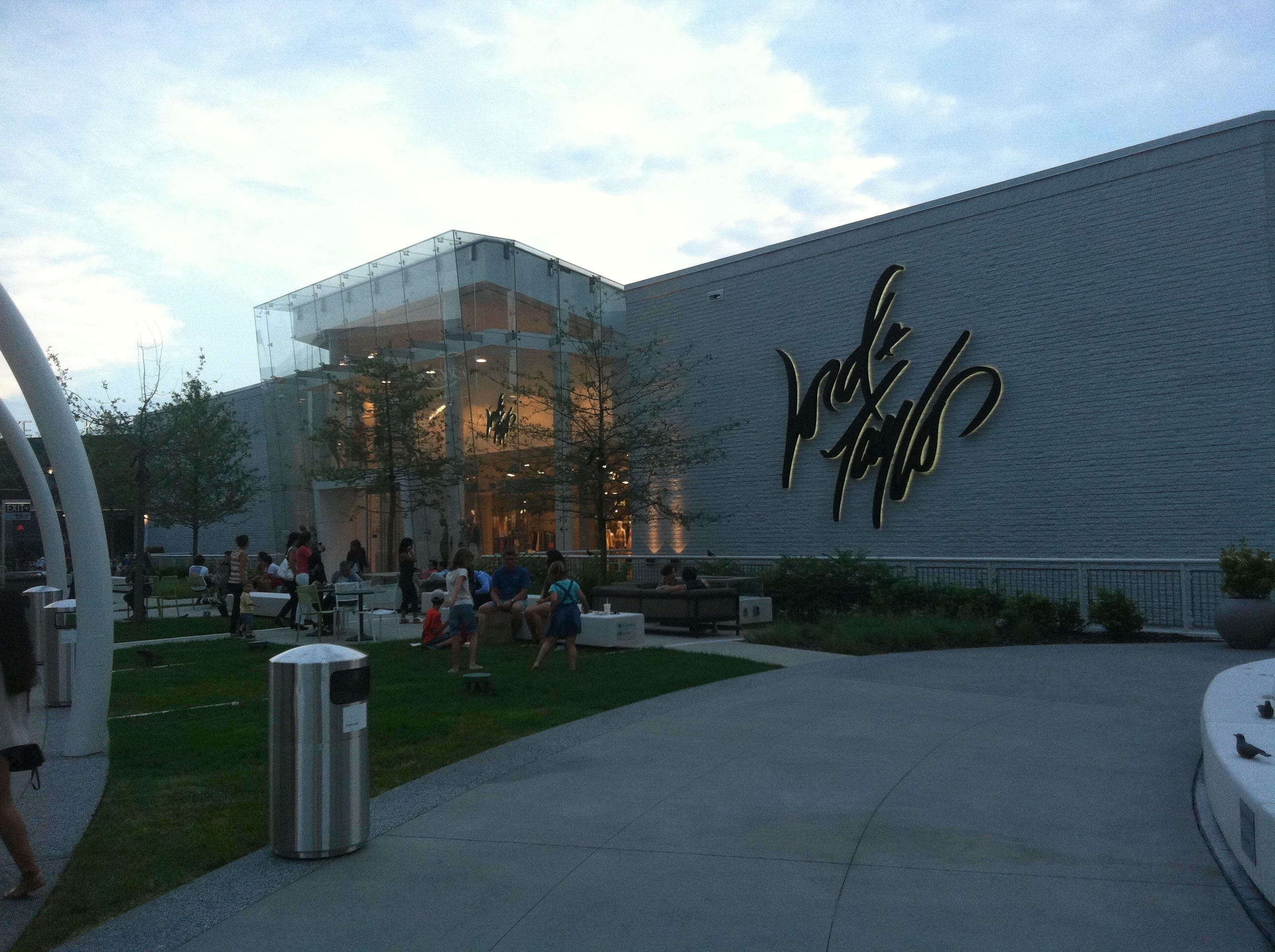
The Tysons Corner Center store in 2015

In October 2017, after an attempt made to build a skyscraper above the Fifth Avenue store, it was announced the building would be sold in a joint venture to WeWork for $850 million ($1.1 billion in 2025). WeWork was set to occupy the uppermost floors of the building, with the rest remaining a newly updated flagship for Lord & Taylor. In February 2019, the sale completed for $725 million ($899 million in 2025) in cash and the remainder in equity, forming a joint venture with Lord & Taylor as a non-controlling interest. Analysts linked the decision to growing pressure from activist investors and a strategic push to monetize real estate assets.

In May 2018, Walmart began offering Lord & Taylor fashions on its website as part of an effort to modernize its brand and appeal to a more upscale customer base.

=== Under Le Tote, 2019–2020 ===
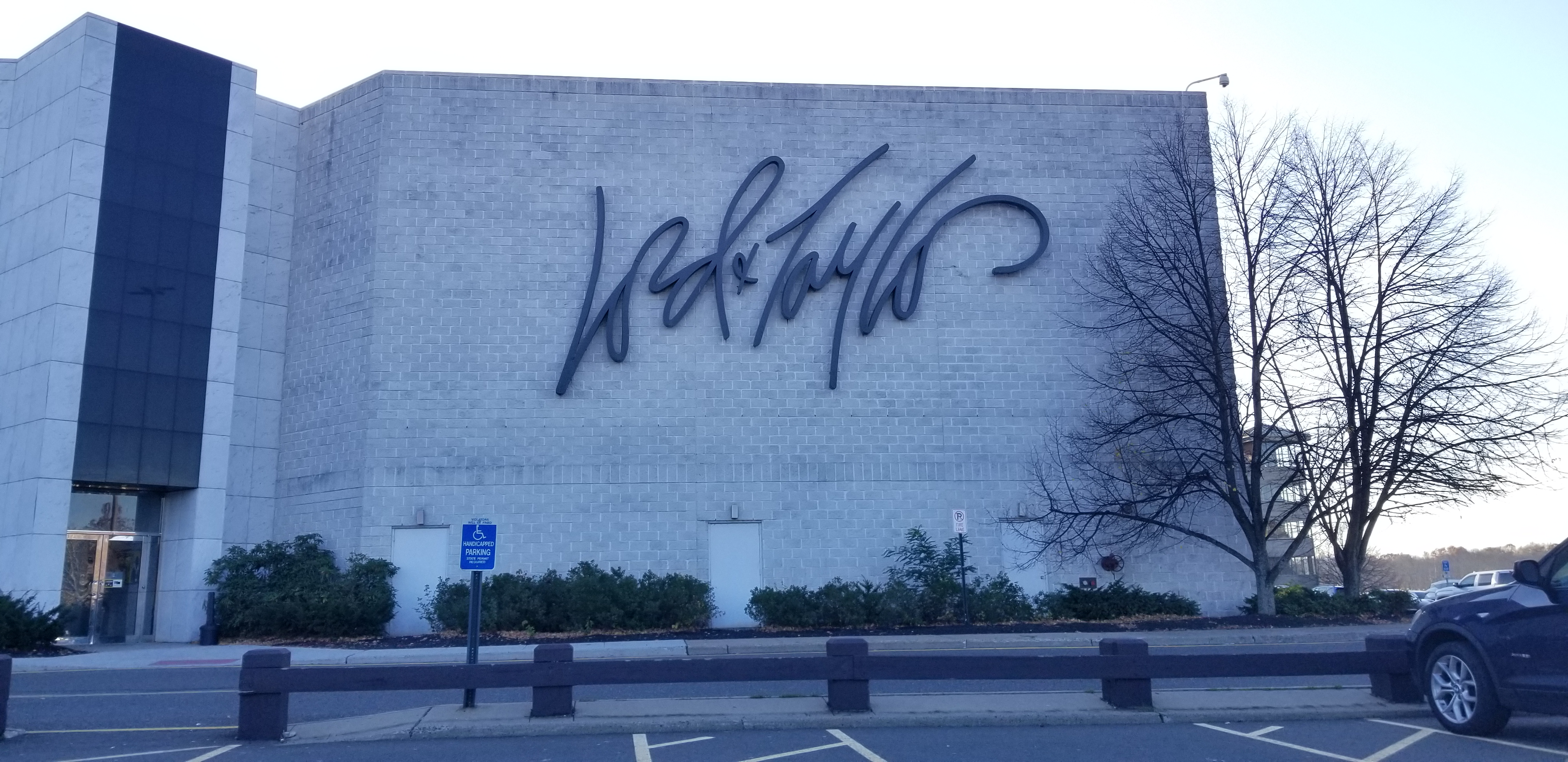
The Danbury Fair Mall store in 2019

In August 2019, Hudson’s Bay Company invested in Le Tote, Inc., a fashion rental retailer. In exchange for Hudson’s Bay Company gaining a 25% equity stake in the newly formed joint venture, Le Tote acquired operational control of Lord & Taylor, a Hudson’s Bay Company subsidiary, for $75 million in cash at closing and an additional $25 million payable two years later. Le Tote retained ownership of the stores’ inventory, valued at approximately $213.2 million, while Hudson’s Bay Company maintained ownership of Lord & Taylor’s substantial and valuable real estate portfolio. As part of the agreement, Hudson’s Bay Company committed to covering store lease obligations for at least three years, at an estimated cost of $58 million per year. The joint venture with Le Tote was finalized in November 2019.

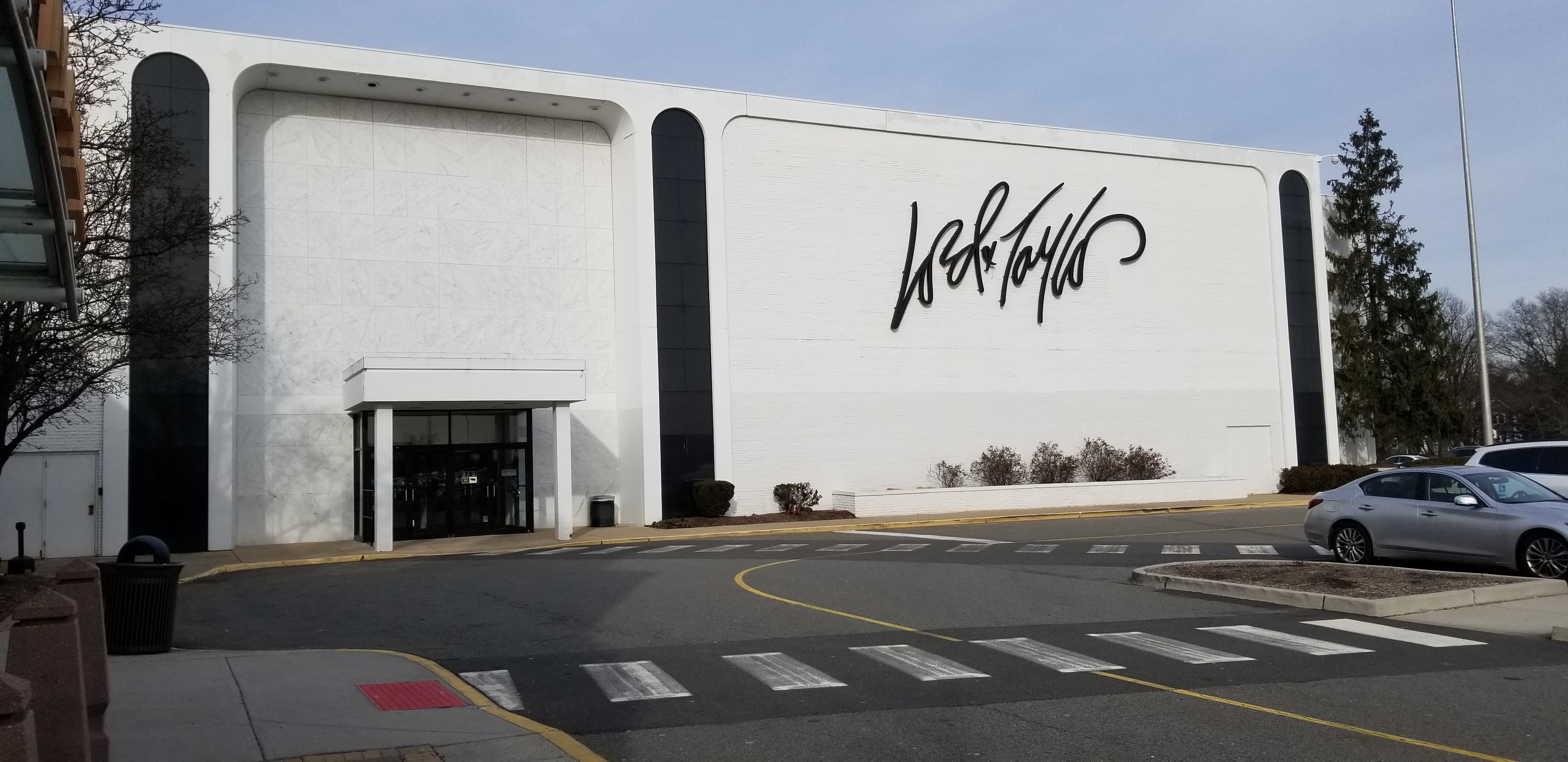
The Livingston Mall store in 2020

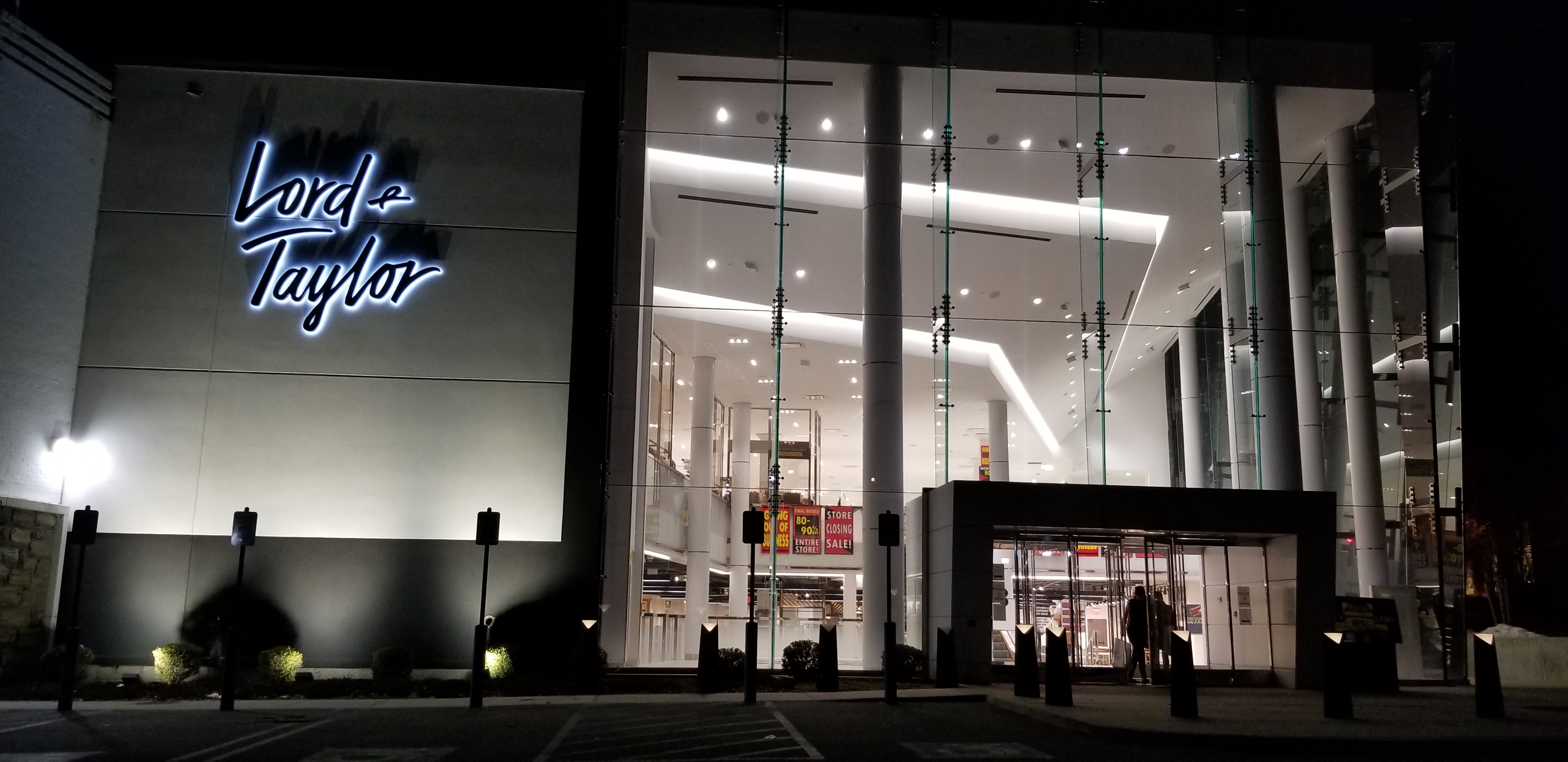
The Manhasset, New York store on Long Island in 2020

Lord & Taylor's stores were forced to close due to executive state orders by the local and state governments on non-essential retail by Wednesday, March 18, 2020, due to the COVID-19 pandemic in the United States. Lord & Taylor began the process of reopening on Friday, May 15, 2020, with two of its locations in Florida and New Hampshire allowed to reopen. All stores resumed operations by July 3, 2020.

On August 2, 2020, Lord & Taylor and Le Tote had filed for Chapter 11 bankruptcy protection due to the COVID-19 pandemic in the United States. The following day, Lord & Taylor announced that it would close 19 stores and then added another 5 locations to the list on August 20. Finally on August 27, Lord & Taylor announced that it would close all of its stores and go out of business after almost 200 years. It had 38 stores at the time of the announcement.

On October 15, 2020, the investment firm Saadia Group announced it would acquire Lord & Taylor. On Saturday, February 27, 2021, the remaining 19 stores closed.

=== Under Saadia Group and Regal Brands Global, 2020–present ===
In October 2020, the investment firm Saadia Group acquired Lord & Taylor; they transitioned the retailer into a digital-first format. In fall 2022, an ad campaign called "Fall Fete" debuted alongside a new logo. In 2024, Regal Brands Global acquired Lord & Taylor with the intention of continuing its digital retail approach.

In July 2026, Lord & Taylor announced the relaunch of its private label, the Heritage Collection.

== Logos ==
Logo handwritten by Andrew Geller, used before 2019, current logo since 2024.

A logo originally introduced by Hudson's Bay Company, in use from 2015‍–‍2019.

A slightly altered logo introduced by Hudson's Bay Company, in use from 2015‍–‍2019, 2021‍–‍2022.

The logo introduced by Hudson's Bay Company, in use between 2019‍–‍2020.

The logo introduced by Saadia Group, in use from 2022–2024.

== Gallery ==
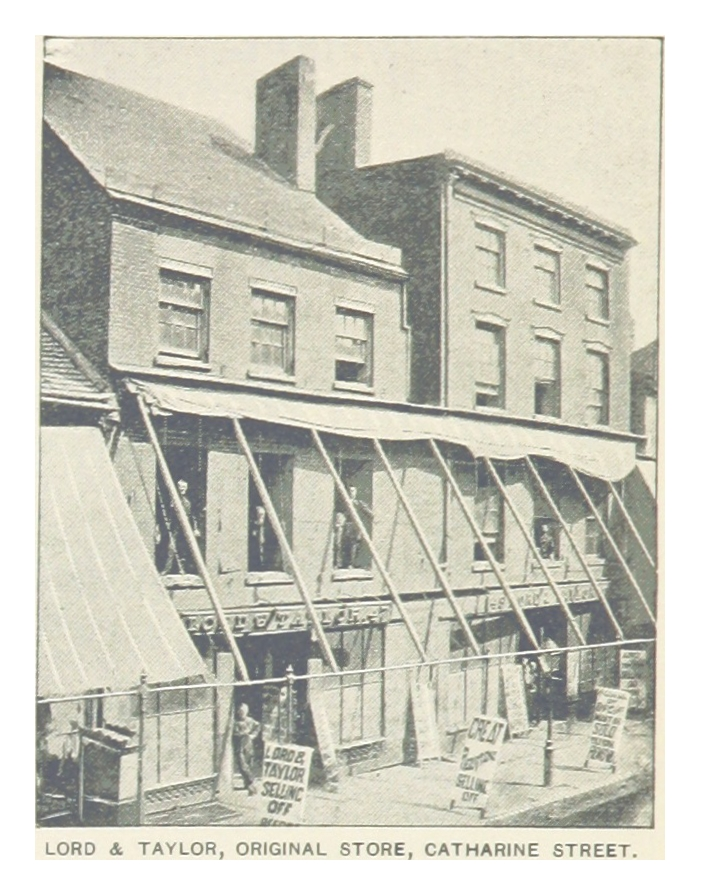
Catharine Street store

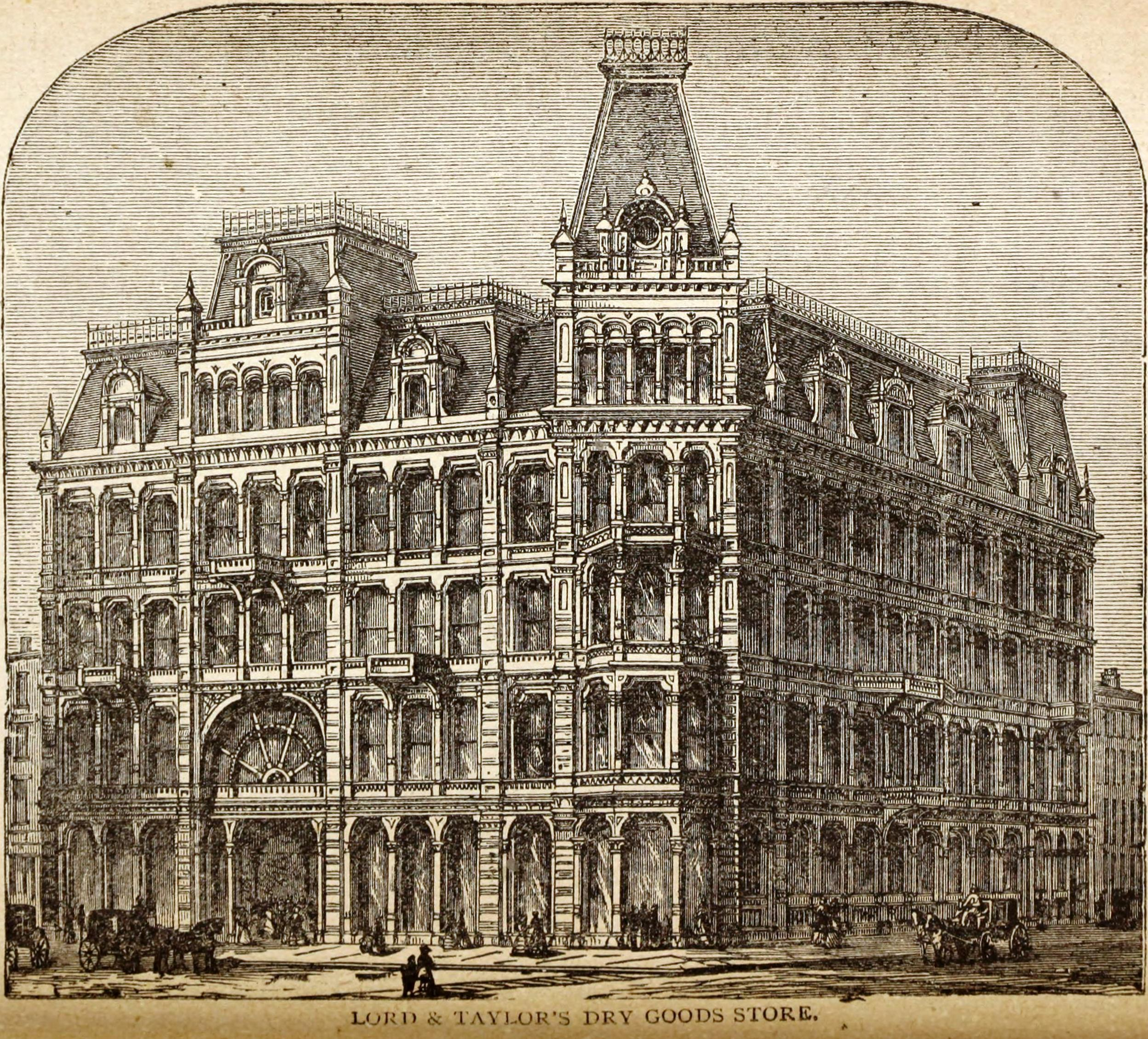
20th Street and Broadway

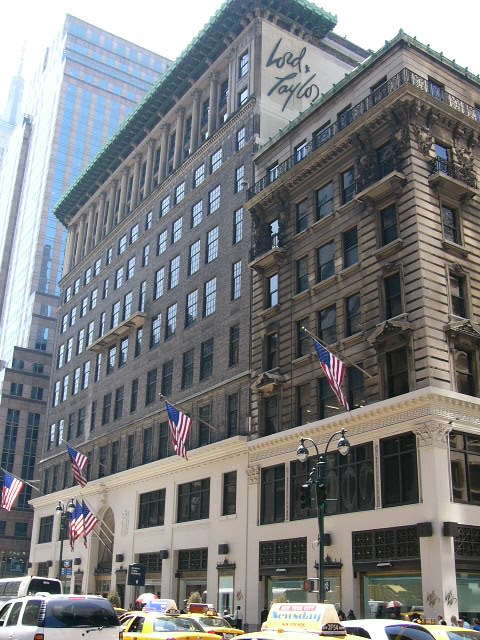
Lord & Taylor Flagship at 424 Fifth Avenue

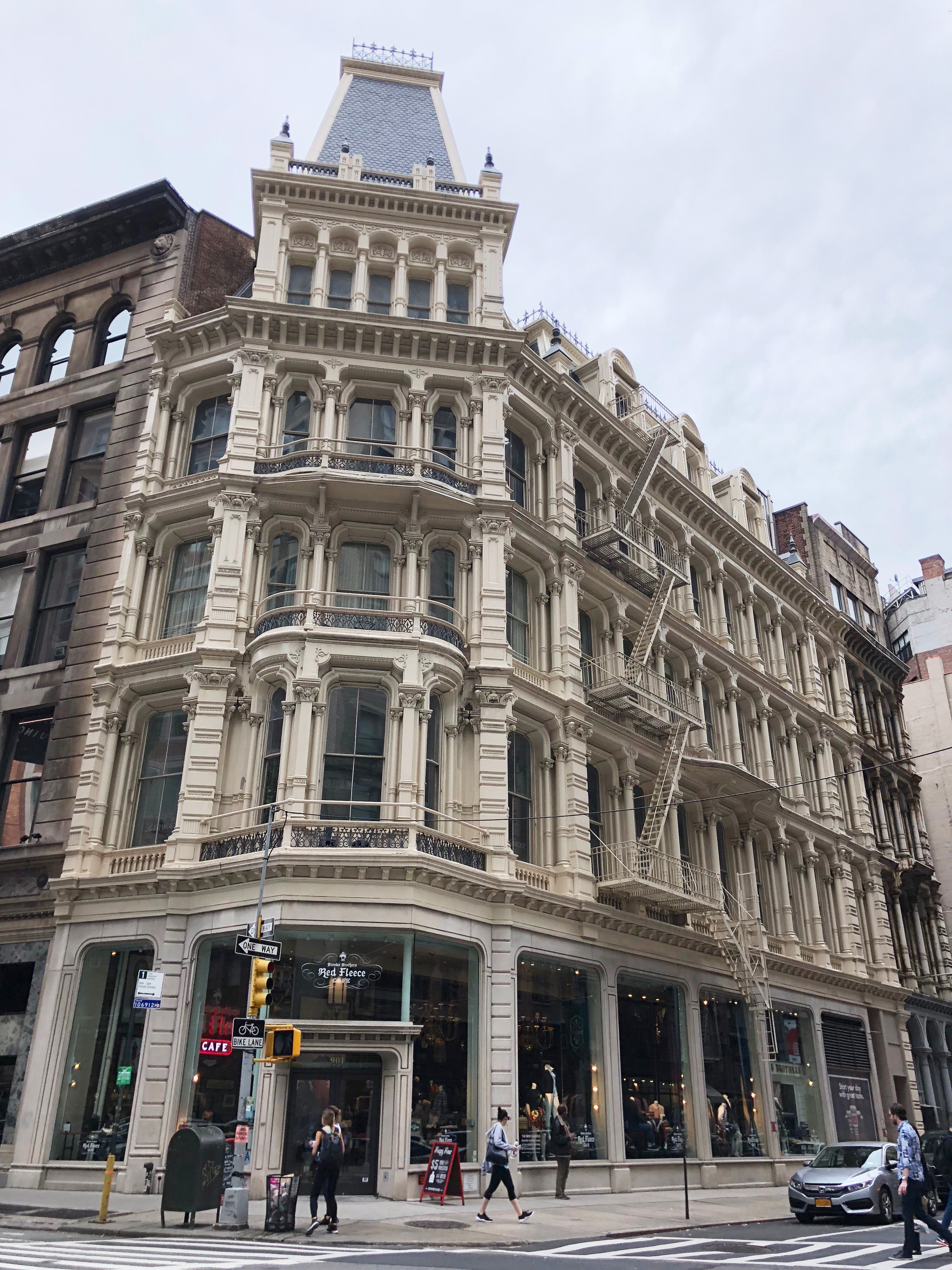
Exterior view of the remaining section of the 1870 store at Broadway and 20th Street.
