= Portsmouth by-election =

Portsmouth by-election may refer to one of two by-elections held for the British House of Commons constituency of Portsmouth:

- 1900 Portsmouth by-election
- 1916 Portsmouth by-election
