= Roderick Maclean =

Attempted assassin of Queen Victoria

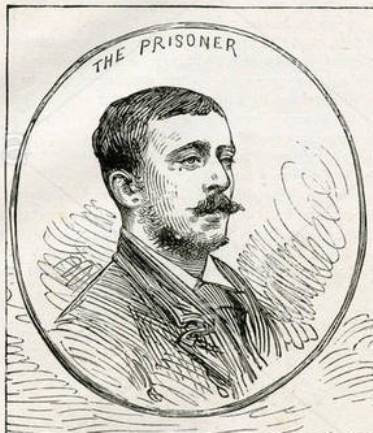
- Born: Roderick Edward Maclean c. 1854
- Died: 8 June 1921; Broadmoor Asylum, England
- Known for: Attempted 1882 regicide of Queen Victoria

Roderick Edward Maclean (c. 1854 – 8 June 1921) attempted to assassinate Queen Victoria with a pistol on 2 March 1882, in Windsor, England. He was the son of Charles Maclean, owner of Fun magazine.

Maclean's was the last of eight attempts by separate people to kill or assault Victoria over a period of four decades. Maclean's motive was purportedly a curt reply to some poetry that he had mailed to the Queen.

The attempted murder followed the arrival of the Royal train, conveying the Queen, Princess Beatrice and the Court from Windsor. Queen Victoria had just walked across the platform of Windsor station to a carriage in waiting when Maclean, who was standing at the entrance of the station yard among a number of spectators, deliberately fired a revolver at her. The shot missed, and Maclean was seized by Chief Superintendent Hayes, of the Borough Police, and the weapon wrenched from his grasp by someone in the crowd. – Birmingham Daily Gazette, 1921

Other accounts state that the revolver was a toy and that his aim was disrupted by an Eton schoolboy:

The weapon was a mere toy, and the life of the beloved monarch was not seriously endangered. A number of Eton boys were round the station at the time, and one of them rushed forward and struck Maclean with his umbrella, disconcerting his aim — which was unlikely enough, in any case, to have been accurate. The boy in question, Gordon Chesney Wilson, was called to the Castle by her Majesty and thanked for his promptitude. He was the son of Sir Samuel Wilson, the Australian wool magnate, who introduced salmon into the Australian rivers and afterwards sat in Parliament for a short time for Portsmouth. Gordon Wilson married Lady Sarah Spencer-Churchill, a sister of Lord Randolph and Lady Wimborne. He was killed in the early days of the war. The wretched lunatic, therefore, survived all the other chief actors in his poor little drama, paying dearly for his brief notoriety. He had, however, the distinction of undergoing trial for high treason. – Lichfield Mercury, 1921

At his trial, Dr. Charles Vernon Hitchins testified that MacLean had been certified insane in June 1880, two years before the attempted assassination, and he had been sent to Somerset Lunatic Asylum. He was living at 14 Wadham Street in Weston-super-Mare. Dr. Hitchins stated that Maclean was complaining of headaches and believed that all the people in England were against him, and he felt he must injure someone because they were conspiring to deceive him. He had also sent letters to his sister in 1880, Caroline Maclean, stating that, "If I cannot commit a murder one way, I will another way, and all can add is, if there is more difficulty, there may be more victims." Multiple doctors also testified that Maclean was insane and "did not believe he was capable of appreciating the nature or quality of any act which he might commit."

Tried for high treason on 20 April, Maclean was found "not guilty, but insane" by a jury after five minutes' deliberation, overseen by Lord Chief Justice Coleridge, and he lived out his remaining days in Broadmoor Asylum. The verdict prompted the Queen to ask for a change in English law so that those implicated in cases with similar outcomes would be considered as "guilty, but insane"; this led to the Trial of Lunatics Act 1883.

A poem was later written about Maclean's attempt on the Queen's life by William Topaz McGonagall.
