= Gordon Chesney Wilson =

British Army officer

Gordon Wilson MVO
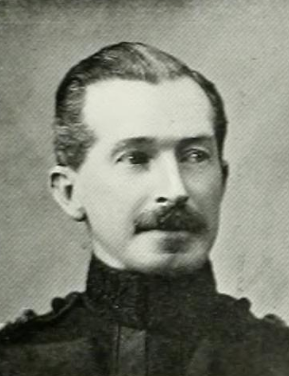
- Born: 3 August 1865; Longerenong, Victoria, Australia
- Died: 6 November 1914 (aged 49); Ypres, Belgium
- Burial place: Zillebeke Churchyard
- Education: Melbourne Grammar School; Eton College; Christ Church, Oxford
- Spouse: Lady Sarah Spencer-Churchill (m. 1891)
- Relatives: Sir Samuel Wilson (father); Herbert Haydon Wilson (brother)
- Military career
- Allegiance: United Kingdom
- Branch: British Army
- Service years: 1885–1914
- Rank: Lieutenant-Colonel
- Unit: Royal Horse Guards
- Conflicts: Second Boer War; Siege of Mafeking; First World War; First Battle of Ypres †
- Awards: Member of the Royal Victorian Order; Mentioned in dispatches × 2 Legion of Honour

Lieutenant-Colonel Gordon Chesney Wilson MVO (3 August 1865 – 6 November 1914) was a British Army officer and husband of the war correspondent Lady Sarah Wilson. As an Eton College student he assisted in thwarting Roderick Maclean's assassination attempt on Queen Victoria in 1882, before joining the Royal Horse Guards in 1887. Wilson was promoted quickly, and as a captain was appointed aide-de-camp to Robert Baden-Powell at the start of the Second Boer War, in which role he served through the Siege of Mafeking. He was created a Member of the Royal Victorian Order in 1901.

During the inter-war years Wilson joined his friend Winston Churchill on a fact-finding trip to East Africa, and then participated in a controversial treasure hunting expedition in Jerusalem. Having been promoted to lieutenant-colonel in 1907, when the First World War began in 1914 Wilson took the Royal Horse Guards to the Western Front. Fighting in the First Battle of Ypres, on 6 November 1914 he was shot in the head and killed while repelling a German breakthrough at Kleine Zillebeke.

== Early life ==
Gordon Chesney Wilson was born at the Longerenong homestead, near Horsham, Victoria, in Australia, on 3 August 1865. He was the eldest son of the politician and philanthropist Sir Samuel Wilson and Jean née Campbell. He had three younger brothers, including the Olympian Herbert Haydon Wilson, and three sisters. The elder Wilson was an ex-miner who had made a fortune as a pastoralist, and the family spent time in both England and Australia. In 1877 Wilson was enrolled at Melbourne Grammar School, but around two years later he moved to England, attending Eton College.

On 2 March 1882 Wilson was present with another schoolboy at Windsor railway station when Roderick Maclean attempted to assassinate Queen Victoria; the two boys attacked Maclean with their umbrellas and assisted in detaining him. (Note: When in England Wilson's family lived at Hughenden Manor. After the assassination attempt, his father had a stained glass window constructed for Hughenden Church that commemorated the event.) Victoria visited Eton on 6 March to receive an address, and shook their hands in thanks. Some accounts report that Victoria also promised the boys commissions in the British Army. Wilson was one of the witnesses later brought to Maclean's trial. He went on to study at Christ Church, Oxford, in 1885.

== Military career ==
=== Marriage ===
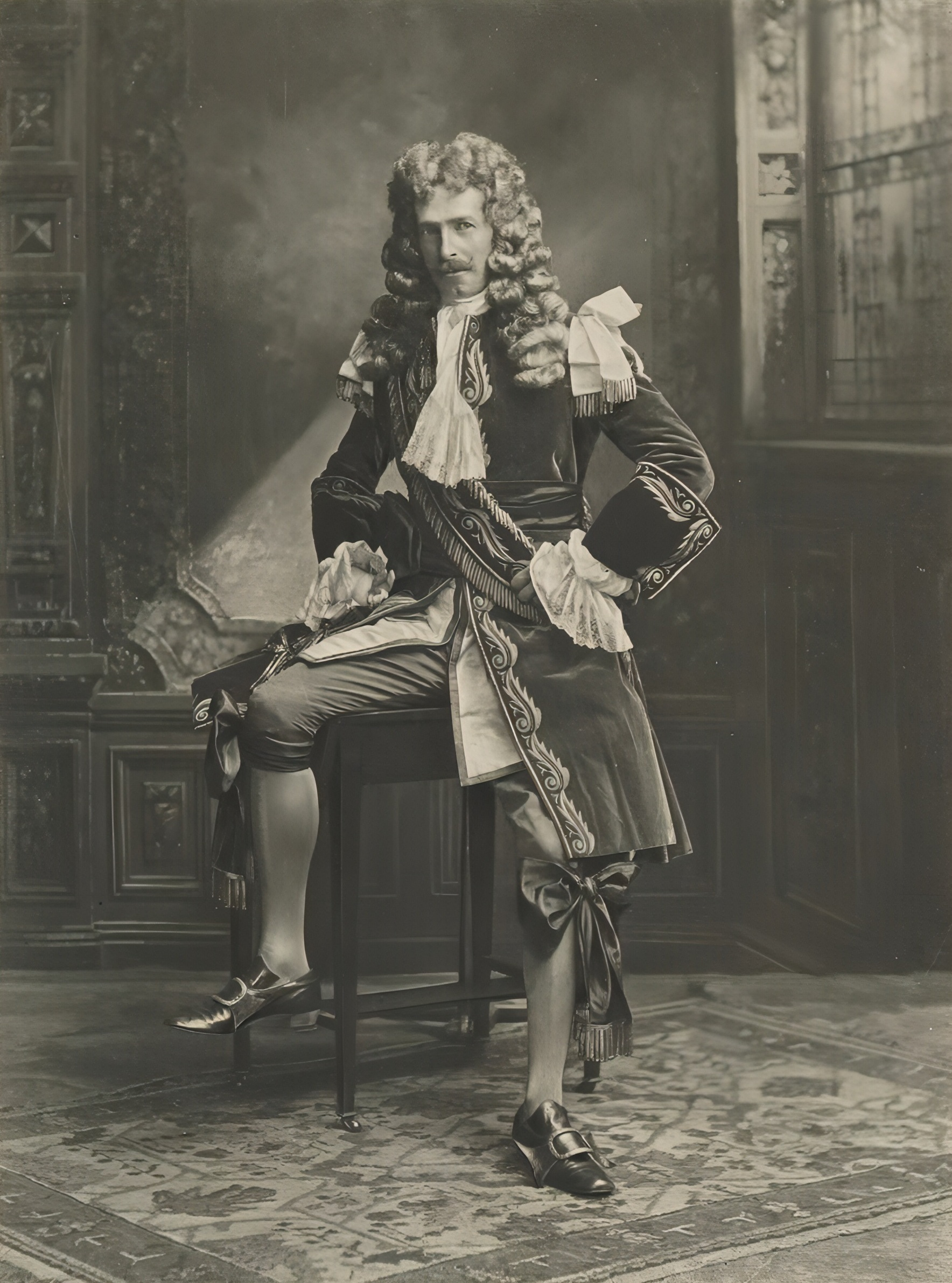
Wilson at the Devonshire House Ball of 1897

Wilson's first military service was in the part-time militia. He became a lieutenant in the 3rd (Royal Bucks Militia) Battalion, Oxfordshire Light Infantry, on 17 January 1885. He transferred to the 3rd and 4th Battalions, the Duke of Wellington's (West Riding Regiment), on 25 June of the same year. Wilson then joined the regular British Army as a second lieutenant on 4 May 1887, replacing a dead subaltern in the Royal Horse Guards (Blues). He was promoted to lieutenant on 5 December 1888. Soon after this promotion Wilson met Lady Sarah Spencer-Churchill, the youngest daughter of John Spencer-Churchill, 7th Duke of Marlborough, through her sister Lady Fanny who his parents were friends with. Encouraged by Lady Randolph Churchill, Wilson and Sarah began to court. Ignoring the social disparity between their two families, Wilson proposed to and was accepted by her.

The couple were married on 21 November 1891 by Edward White Benson, the Archbishop of Canterbury, at St George's, Hanover Square. The wedding was a star-studded affair that included Edward, Prince of Wales and George, Duke of Cambridge, and was widely publicised. Wilson and Sarah would go on to have two sons; Randolph Gordon Wilson (1893–1956) and Adam Spencer Wilson (1894–1905). Wilson continued in the army after his marriage; despite his relatively lowly position, the historian Brian Roberts writes that the couple "lived like plutocrats". A professional and dedicated soldier, his only interest outside of his career was horseracing; notably one of his horses, Father O'Flynn, won the 1892 Grand National. After the wedding of Prince George, Duke of York, and Princess Mary of Teck on 6 July 1893, Wilson commanded the Travelling Escort that took the couple to their honeymoon at Sandringham House. He was promoted to captain on 21 November the following year, at the same time as which he is recorded as serving in the Sovereign's Escort. Roberts describes Wilson in this period, saying:

Gordon...was an undistinguished, homely-looking man with a large, untidy walrus moustache which, despite his laughing eyes, gave him a somewhat gloomy look. For a military man he was surprisingly round-shouldered.

=== Tour of South Africa ===
In November 1895 Wilson and his wife travelled to South Africa to visit the Churchill family's gold mining interests in Johannesburg. Also on their ship was Alfred Beit, a gold magnate and friend of the family who was a key part of the conspiracy behind the Jameson Raid, an attempt to trigger an uprising in the South African Republic. Upon their arrival Beit took the Wilsons to visit Cecil Rhodes at Groote Schuur, where they stayed for several days and were onlookers to discussions relating to the issues in the Transvaal. The couple afterwards stayed with John Blades Currey in Kimberley, where they learned of the failure of the raid and witnessed the outrage in its aftermath.

The situation in South Africa was now not safe enough for the Wilsons to continue their visits, and they left for Cape Town on 11 January 1896. Rhodes resigned as Prime Minister of the Cape Colony a day later, and on 15 January the Wilsons saw him off at the docks as he sailed for England. Determined to still reach the Transvaal, they then received permission to go as passengers on board the troopship Victoria that was sailing to Durban to return Leander Starr Jameson and his raiders to Britain. They toured Johannesburg with a mining expert who had previously worked with Lord Randolph Churchill, staying at the house of Abe Bailey. Bailey had been arrested in the wake of the raid, and the Wilsons visited him in detention in Pretoria. After travelling to Doornkop to see where Jameson had been forced to surrender in his raid, the Wilsons returned to Britain.

=== Boer War ===
Back in England the Wilsons became good friends of Jameson, who had been released after four months of imprisonment. In May 1899 they departed with him for South Africa, intent on a two-month visit to Rhodesia. Based in Bulawayo, they spent five weeks visiting local mines and exploring the veld. During this time the Bloemfontein Conference failed to lessen tensions between the Boer republics and Britain, and the country began to move to a war footing. In early July Rhodes, also returning to South Africa, invited the Wilsons to again stay at Groote Schuur. Rhodes was dismissive of the situation, saying that the Boers "will bluff up to the cannon's mouth", an opinion that Wilson disagreed with, instead believing that they needed to "prepare for the worst". On 25 July Colonel Robert Baden-Powell arrived at Cape Town to raise two regiments of mounted infantry (Note: The Protectorate Regiment and Rhodesia Regiment.) for the defence of Rhodesia and Bechuanaland and to protect lines of communication. Refused permission to raise troops or funds at the Cape, he moved to Bulawayo. While there he appointed Wilson, who he had met at Groote Schuur, as his aide-de-camp, and he was seconded to Baden-Powell's service. (Note: Wilson was officially seconded on 9 October.)

The Wilsons arrived at Bulawayo in August. Unable to locate a recruiting post at Mafeking, in Bechuanaland, because of negative associations with the Jameson Raid, (Note: Mafeking had been the starting point for the Jameson Raid.) Baden-Powell instead situated one at Ramatlhabama just to the north. Wilson was frequently employed travelling between headquarters and the recruitment post, with new men returning to Bulawayo to be trained. He also spent time with Baden-Powell on the border itself. In September the start of the Boer War came nearer and Baden-Powell was finally allowed to garrison Mafeking, taking Wilson with him. There they began to prepare for a protracted siege, training up a town guard and constructing artillery emplacements.

Sarah joined Wilson in Mafeking, the couple living in a small cottage in the town. Preparations for a siege continued into early October as the Boers massed on the border of Bechuanaland; with interest in the area increasing, Sarah was appointed by the Daily Mail to become their war correspondent covering the siege after the previous man was captured by the Boers attempting to leave. She thus became the first female war correspondent.

==== Siege of Mafeking ====
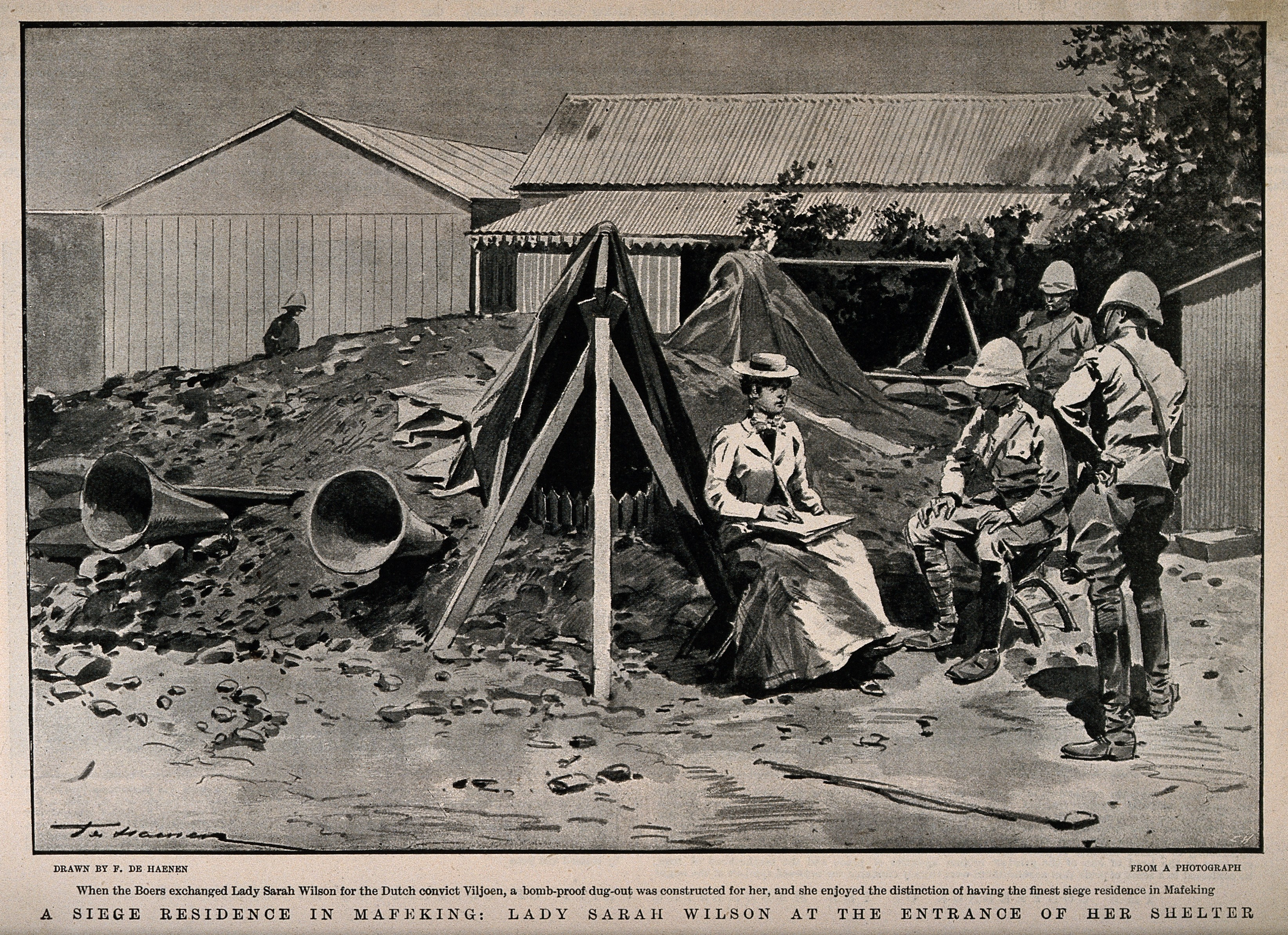
Lady Sarah Wilson's dugout where Wilson initially recuperated from peritonitis

The Siege of Mafeking began on 13 October; Wilson wrote a letter to Sarah, who had left the town beforehand, describing how ineffectual the initial Boer bombardment was. On 3 December he received a letter from Sarah explaining that she had been captured by General Jacobus Philippus Snyman. Snyman offered to exchange Sarah for a convicted horse thief in Mafeking. Baden-Powell initially refused to agree to the exchange, and Wilson began offering a reward to anyone in Mafeking who would take the place of his wife. It was eventually decided that the horse thief would in fact be handed over, and Sarah returned to Mafeking on 5 December. Later the same day the Boers began a fresh bombardment of the town. Wilson was at the time shopping in the chemist which took a direct hit and was totally destroyed; one nearby man was cut to pieces but Wilson emerged unscathed.

After a Christmas Day truce, in the early morning of 26 December Wilson and most of Baden-Powell's staff participated in a sortie attacking Game Tree Hill, a well-placed and dangerous Boer gun emplacement. The Boers were however prepared for the attack; the British armoured train was stopped before it reached the hill, and the location was more heavily defended than had been expected. After around two hours of fighting the British withdrew to Mafeking. The 100-strong force received around fifty per cent casualties, including twenty-four killed. Wilson survived unharmed, with the staff having mostly observed from a nearby fort, but in January the following year he received a severe attack of peritonitis. He initially recuperated with Sarah, who was serving as a nurse, in her dugout. When she also fell ill with tonsillitis they were moved to the Mafeking convent, the replacement for the destroyed convalescent home, with Wilson having to be driven there as he was unable to walk.

On 26 January 1900 the Wilsons were dining with Major Hamilton Goold-Adams when a Boer artillery shell burst above their building, collapsing one wall on top of them. A rescue party dragged the three out of the rubble, they having received only light wounds. Roberts notes that "their survival was regarded as little short of a miracle". Having in the meantime recovered from their illnesses, the Wilsons left the convent the same day. In February it was learned that Mafeking would have to hold out for relief until May, but food stocks would only last until April. In response to this a horse meat factory was created, and Wilson used the products of this to organise soup kitchens for the native population. By the end of the month the soup, concocted from dog, horse, mule, and chicken, could feed around 1,000 people a day. With dwindling food and the possibility that relief would not arrive until June, on 12 May a Boer attack succeeded in breaking into Mafeking police barracks. Snyman failed to reinforce the attack and after holding out for the rest of the day, the remaining Boers surrendered.

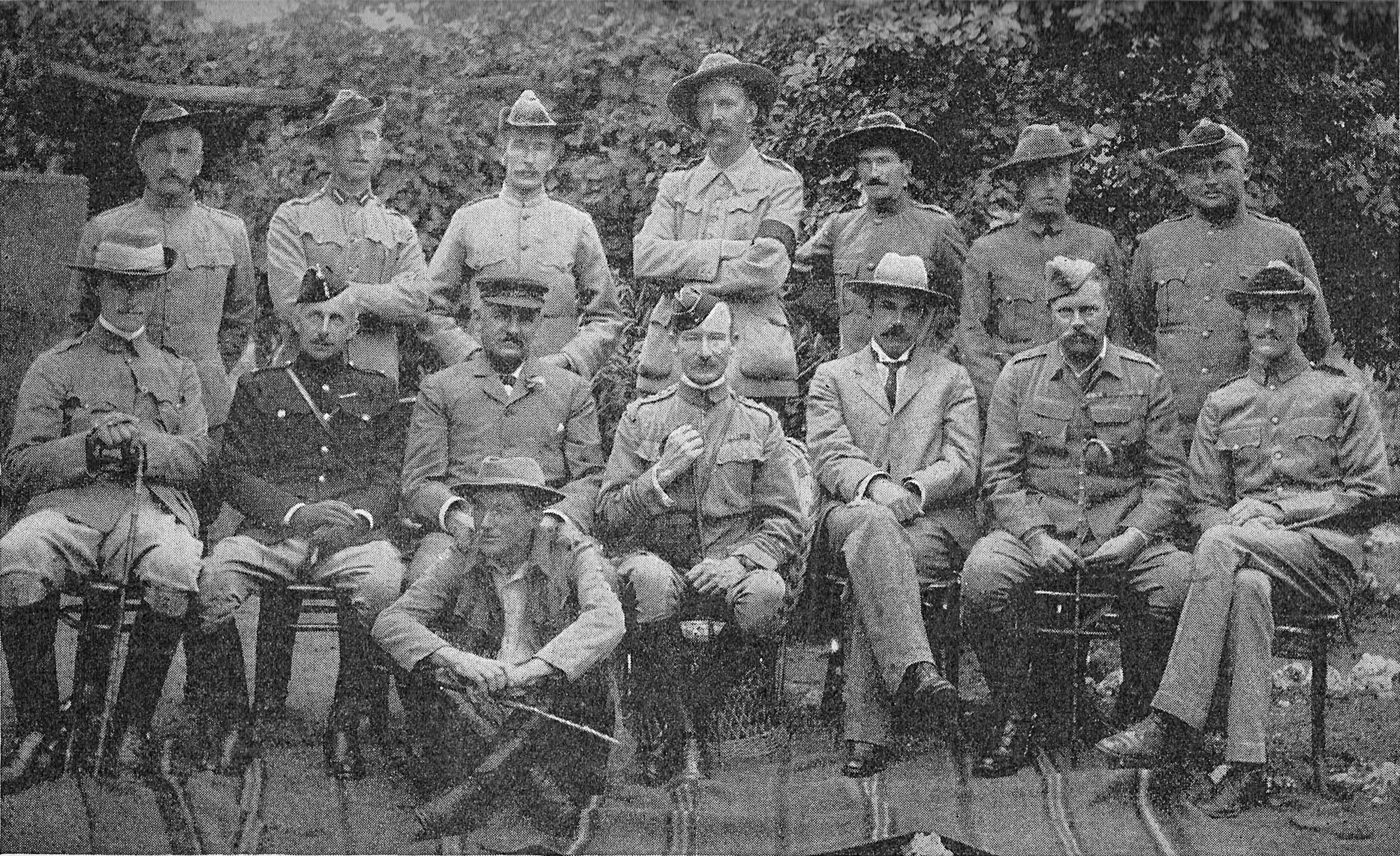
Robert Baden-Powell's staff after the Siege of Mafeking. Wilson is in the top row, fifth from the left

A relief force under Colonel Bryan Mahon arrived on 17 May, with Wilson first spotting them from a lookout post. He brought together a force of horsemen and artillery and, with Baden-Powell, rode out to cut off a Boer detachment trying to stop Mahon. They returned in the evening having failed to find the Boers in the worsening light, but in the night Mahon's column entered Mafeking, ending the 217-day siege. Wild celebrations took place in Britain after the relief, with a large crowd forming outside the Grosvenor Square house where the Wilson children were staying. The Mafeking garrison recuperated and by 3 June was ready for further action. They travelled to Rustenburg and occupied it in order to clear the route between Mafeking and Pretoria.

The British subsequently occupied Pretoria, and Baden-Powell and his staff went there to talk with Field-Marshal Lord Roberts as the telegraph lines had all been cut. When Baden-Powell returned to Rustenburg only Wilson and one other staff officer was still with him, and they were paraded out of Pretoria with Roberts riding alongside them. On 18 July Wilson re-joined his wife at Cape Town and they sailed home to Britain.

By 1901 Wilson was again serving in South Africa, with his residence in the Transvaal. On 28 May that year he was appointed a Member of the Royal Victorian Order, Fourth Class. During the war he was twice mentioned in dispatches, and received the Queen's South Africa Medal with three clasps. Wilson's brothers also served in the Boer War. Herbert survived and was awarded the Distinguished Service Order, while of his other siblings Wilfred died of wounds he received and Clarence was severely wounded to the extent he was considered unfit for any further military service.

=== Inter-war period ===
Wilson was subsequently promoted to major on 14 January 1903, and then to brevet lieutenant-colonel on 7 October 1907. By this time Wilson had struck up a friendship with Sarah's nephew, the politician Winston Churchill. In the same year Churchill, as Under-Secretary of State for the Colonial Office, went abroad on a five-month fact-finding trip. When he arrived in Malta he expected to travel on with his cousin Freddie Guest, but Guest's wife was about to give birth. Churchill instead invited Wilson to join him. They sailed across the Red Sea on board HMS Venus, reaching Mombasa in November. From there they used the Uganda Railway to reach Nairobi, where they hunted rhino. Afterwards the party met with Daudi Cwa II in Uganda and again frequently hunted, and subsequently arrived in Khartoum on 23 December. Churchill and Wilson returned home via Paris in mid-January 1908. Churchill wrote to Edward VII during the journey that Wilson was:

an excellent traveller never not of spirits or tired or bored or vexed whatever may hap[pen].

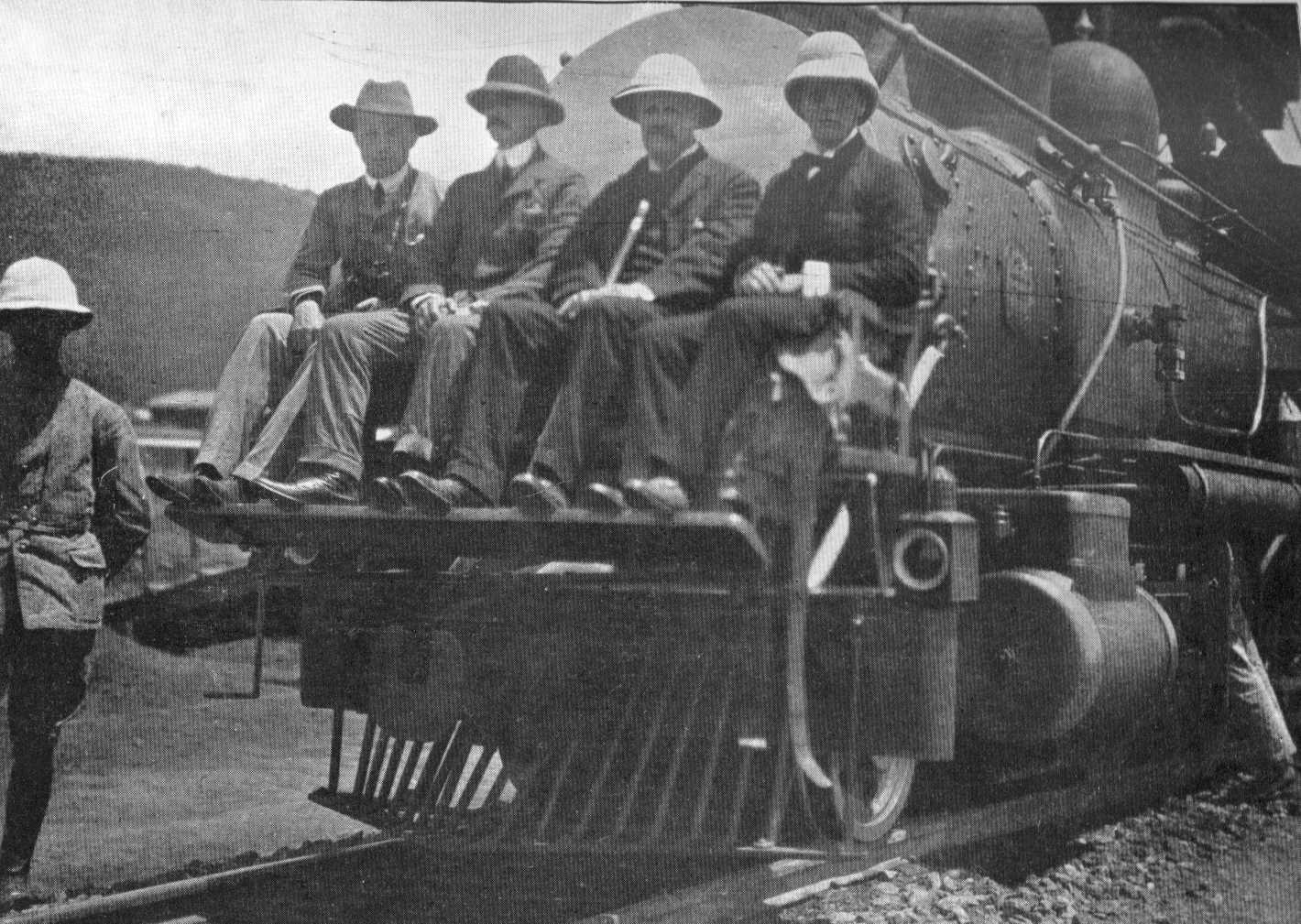
Wilson (third from left) in the VIP seats on the Uganda Railway

Churchill published a record of the trip in the book My African Journey in 1909, including photographs provided by Wilson. In 1910 Wilson spent some time in Jerusalem, and in early 1911 he became involved in his younger brother Clarence's work as part of the Parker Expedition, an attempt to find treasure in excavations of Solomon's Temple. In April the group used a German psychic to attempt to find the Ark of the Covenant, digging around Solomon's Stables. They found nothing there but then gained permission to excavate in the Dome of the Rock itself. As the Dome was a sacred space to Jews and Muslims, the expedition was nervous about digging there and therefore only did so at night, while wearing Arabic clothing. Having bribed locals to assist them they explored tunnels under the Dome, digging for nine nights.

On 12 April the diggers were discovered at work and exposed to the general public. A demonstration of 2,000 Muslims formed and riots were feared; on 16 April an enquiry was launched into the affair and two days later the expedition fled to Jaffa. There under the pretence of preparing to host a party they escaped in Clarence's yacht. Wilson was promoted to the substantive rank of lieutenant-colonel on 7 October and given command of his regiment.

=== First World War ===
When the First World War began in 1914 the Royal Horse Guards were sent to the Western Front. They joined the 7th Cavalry Brigade, made up of the Household Cavalry regiments, in October. On 18 October the brigade entrenched itself west of Zandvoorde, ready for the First Battle of Ypres. The following day they were attacked by a greater German force, taking heavy casualties because, cavalry not being provided with entrenching tools, their trenches were too shallow. On 30 October the Germans began a new offensive meant to break through to Ypres, with the most brutal attack going against the units of the Household Cavalry. The 7th Brigade was initially in reserve, based in a wood in the Ypres Salient. On 6 November the Prussian Guards broke through the line in front of the brigade at Kleine Zillebeke, and it was sent forward to stem the attack. Wilson led his men into action as dismounted cavalry, and the Germans were pushed back into the wood at Zwarteleen, around one mile from Zillebeke. As the fighting became increasingly confused, Wilson was killed at around dusk. Captain Sir George Arthur recorded that:

...before the threshold of the wood could be reached, the Blues had lost their Colonel. A borrowed rifle in his hand, a cheery laugh bubbling up, Gordon Wilson was a few feet ahead of his men when a bullet pierced his brain.

Wilson's will was proved on 23 December; he left Sarah, who was at the time running a military hospital in Boulogne, £189,230-17s. A memorial service was held for him at Christ Church, Mayfair, and Sarah received messages of condolence from George V, Mary of Teck, Alfonso XIII, and Victoria Eugenie of Battenberg among others. Churchill, then First Lord of the Admiralty, described Wilson's death as "the end of the world". Wilson was buried at Zillebeke Churchyard in the Commonwealth War Graves Commission section. His brother Herbert, who would himself be killed in 1917, sent Wilson's personal belongings home to Sarah, including a newspaper cutting of lines inspired by the play The Two Noble Kinsmen. Sarah took inspiration from these for Wilson's headstone, which reads:

Life is a city of crooked streets
Death the market place where all men meet

Wilson was posthumously awarded the 1914 Star, British War Medal, and Victory Medal, having also been created a member of the French Legion of Honour.
