= Thomas Bramsdon =

British politician

Sir Thomas Bramsdon

Member of Parliament for Portsmouth Central
- In office 6 December 1923 – 29 October 1924
- Preceded by: Frank Privett
- Succeeded by: Harry Foster
- In office 14 December 1918 – 15 November 1922
- Preceded by: Constituency established
- Succeeded by: Frank Privett

Member of Parliament for Portsmouth
- In office 8 February 1906 – 10 February 1910 Serving with John Baker
- Preceded by: Reginald Lucas
- Succeeded by: Charles Beresford
- In office 3 May 1900 – 24 October 1900 Serving with John Baker
- Preceded by: Walter Clough
- Succeeded by: Reginald Lucas

Personal details
- Born: Thomas Arthur Bramsdon; 27 February 1857 Portsea, Portsmouth, Hampshire, UK
- Died: 29 September 1935 (aged 78)
- Party: Liberal Party
- Spouse: Mary Anna Adelaide
- Occupation: Solicitor

Sir Thomas Arthur Bramsdon (27 February 1857 – 29 September 1935) was a British solicitor from Portsmouth and a Liberal Party politician who was elected for four non-consecutive terms as a Member of Parliament (MP) for Portsmouth constituencies.

== Early life ==
Bramsdon was born on 27 February 1857 in Portsea, Portsmouth, the son of John and Emma Bramsdon. In the 1861 Census his father was described as a retail brewer living at 40 Hertford Street, Portsea and Thomas is listed as a four-year-old Scholar.

In the 1871 Census Bramsdon is living with his widowed mother at 350 Commercial Road, Portsea and is described as a 14-year-old solicitor's clerk.

Bramsdon was educated at Esplanade House School, in Portsmouth, and admitted as a solicitor in 1878, practising in the local firm of Bramsdon and Childs. He later became a Justice of the Peace and Coroner for Portsmouth, and was at one time President of Coroners' Society for England and Wales. He also served as Chairman of the Governors of the Royal Portsmouth, Portsea, and Gosport Hospital, as a Governor of Portsmouth Grammar School, and for six years was Chairman of the Portsmouth School Board.

In 1880 he married Mary Anna Adelaide (née Reid), the only daughter of Captain Charles Auguste Reid of the 20th Bengal Infantry.

== Political career ==
He was first elected to the House of Commons at a by-election in May 1900 for the Borough of Portsmouth following the resignation of the Liberal MP Walter Clough. However, he lost his seat five months later in a very closely fought contest at the general election in October 1900. Two Liberal candidates and two Conservatives had contested the two seats, with the Conservatives winning both seats; but although Bramsdon won the lowest number of votes, his 24.2% share was only fractionally below that required to win a seat.

At the 1906 general election, Bramsdon and Sir John Baker retook both seats for the Liberals, but and Bramsdon was knighted in July 1909. He and his fellow Liberal candidate were defeated again in January 1910, and Bramsdon did not stand in the December 1910 election.

During the First World War, Bramsdon was out of Parliament but accepted several war-related public appointments. He was Vice-Chairman of Portsmouth District Recruiting Committee from 1914 to 1918, was appointed as National Service Commissioner for Portsmouth and East Hampshire in 1917.

However, at the post-World War I general election in December 1918, the two-seat Portsmouth constituency was replaced by three single-member divisions, and Bramsdon stood in Portsmouth Central. He faced both a Labour Party and a Coalition Conservative opponent, but although the "coalition coupon" issued to supporters of the Conservative-dominated (but Liberal-led) Coalition Government was enough to secure victory in many seats, Bramsdon won Portsmouth Central with a large majority and over 50% of the votes.

At the 1922 general election, Portsmouth Central saw a closely fought 4-way contest, with Labour, Conservative, Liberal and National Liberal candidates all winning over 20% of the votes. The Conservative Frank Privett won with a majority of only 7 votes over the National Liberal, but Bramsdon's third-place was only 2.0% of the votes behind the winner.

The following year, at the general election in December 1923, the rift in the Liberal Party had been healed, and Bramsdon regained the seat. That was his last term in Parliament; he did not contest the 1924 general election.

Parliament of the United Kingdom
Preceded by Sir John Baker; Walter Clough	Member of Parliament for Portsmouth; May 1900 – October 1900; With: Sir John Baker	Succeeded by James Majendie; Reginald Lucas
Preceded by James Majendie; Reginald Lucas	Member of Parliament for Portsmouth; 1906 – January 1910; With: Sir John Baker	Succeeded by Lord Charles Beresford; Sir Bertram Falle
New constituency	Member of Parliament for Portsmouth Central; 1918–1922	Succeeded by Frank Privett
Preceded by Frank Privett	Member of Parliament for Portsmouth Central; 1923–1924	Succeeded by Sir Harry Foster
