= Theo Aronson =

Royal Biographer

Theodore Ian Wilson Aronson (13 November 1929 – 13 May 2003) was a royal biographer whose easy manner enabled him to earn the trust of his subjects.

== Biography ==
He was the son of a Latvian Jewish storekeeper, born at Kirkwood, South Africa and educated at Grey High School in Port Elizabeth before studying art at the University of Cape Town, where he acted with Nigel Hawthorne. He became a commercial artist with J. Walter Thompson in Johannesburg, then transferred to London, where he also worked part-time as a waiter. His interest in royalty began at a young age. He encountered members of the royal family at a railway siding near Kirkwood during the royal tour of Southern Africa in 1947, and was impressed by Queen Elizabeth's charm. After visiting the mausoleum of Napoleon III at St Michael's Abbey in Farnborough, Hampshire, he decided to write about royal subjects.

After a change of publisher, he "was persuaded that dynastic studies were no longer required", so he began to write studies of recent history regarding the British royal family. (The Times, 20 May 2003)

He was well versed in his subjects and became known as a devoted admirer of British royalty. His research included interviewing several members of the royal family, including Princess Alice, Countess of Athlone, about whom he published a biography in 1981, the Queen Mother, and Princess Margaret, as well as numerous courtiers.

He had written twenty-three books and appeared in several television documentaries. In his book Royal Subjects, he acknowledged that during his career as a writer, "various Kings, and their families, have proved to be devilish good subjects for me", and that being "something of an outsider, unrestricted by the British class system" (Royal Subjects, pp. ix-x), had proved an advantage for him being granted almost unprecedented access to royal circles.

Aronson was the partner of historian Brian Roberts for more than 40 years. He died from cancer at Frome in Somerset aged 73.

== Books ==
- The Golden Bees: The Story of the Bonapartes (London: Oldbourne; New York Graphic Society, 1964)
- Royal Vendetta: The Crown of Spain 1829-1965 (London: Purnell; New York: Bobbs-Merrill, 1966)
- The Coburgs of Belgium or (US ed.) Defiant Dynasty: The Coburgs of Belgium (London: Cassell, 1969; NY: Bobbs-Merrill, 1968)
- The Fall of the Third Napoleon (London: Cassell; NY: Bobbs-Merrill, 1970)
- The Kaisers (London: Cassell; NY: Bobbs-Merrill, 1971)
- Queen Victoria and the Bonapartes (London: Cassell; NY: Bobbs-Merrill, 1972)
- Grandmama of Europe: The Crowned Descendants of Queen Victoria (London: Cassell; NY: Bobbs-Merrill, 1973)
- Royal Ambassadors: British Royalties in Southern Africa 1860-1947 (Cape Town: David Philip, 1975)
- A Family of Kings: The Descendants of Christian IX of Denmark (London: Cassell, 1976)
- Victoria and Disraeli: The Making of a Romantic Partnership (London: Cassell, 1977; NY: Macmillan, 1978)
- Kings Over the Water: The Saga of the Stuart Pretenders (London: Cassell, 1979)
- Princess Alice, Countess of Athlone (London: Cassell, 1981)
- Royal Family: Years of Transition (London: John Murray, 1983; NY: Salem House, 1984)
- The King in Love - Edward VII's Mistresses: Lillie Langtry, Daisy Warwick, Alice Keppel and Others (London: John Murray, 1988)
- Crowns in Conflict: The Triumph and the Tragedy of European Monarchy, 1910-1918 (London: John Murray; NY: Salem House, 1986)
- Napoleon and Josephine: A Love Story (London: John Murray; NY: St. Martins Press, 1990)
- Heart of a Queen: Queen Victoria's Romantic Attachments (London: John Murray, 1991)
- Queen Victoria's Scotland, with Michael J. Stead (London: Cassell, 1992)
- The Royal Family at War (London: John Murray, 1993)
- Prince Eddy and the Homosexual Underworld (London: John Murray, 1994)
- Princess Margaret: A Biography (London: Michael O'Mara, 1997)
- Royal Subjects: A Biographer's Encounters (London: Sidgwick & Jackson, 2000)
