= William Crossman =

Sir William Crossman KCMG (30 June 1830 – 19 April 1901) was an officer in the Royal Engineers and a Liberal and Liberal Unionist politician.

== Life ==
Crossman was born at Isleworth, Middlesex, the son of Robert Crossman and his wife Sarah. His father was a brewer of Berwick-upon-Tweed who joined forces with Thomas Paulin to establish a brewery at Isleworth which was to become Mann, Crossman & Paulin. Robert Crossman returned to Berwick and acquired the manor of Holy Island and the family property at Cheswick, Northumberland. In December 1848, Crossman became a lieutenant in the Royal Engineers. He was sent to Western Australia and arrived there aboard Marion on 30 January 1852.

Crossman was in charge of various public works in Australia from 1852 to 1856, and became a Magistrate of the Colony at Albany, Western Australia. He returned to England and from 1857 to 1861, he was under Inspector-General of Fortifications at the War Office, becoming captain in 1858. He then went to Canada where he was temporarily on the staff of Quartermaster-General to the Forces, on the march of troops from Halifax to Riviere du Loup in December 1861 and was then Secretary to the Royal Commission on defences of Canada. From 1866 to 1869 he was in charge of Diplomatic and Consular Buildings in China and Japan, and in 1869 at Constantinople too. He was a member of Treasury Committee on the Irish Board of Works in 1870. He was promoted to major in 1872 and to lieutenant-colonel in 1873. From 1874 to 1875 he was assistant director of Works for Fortifications. In 1875, he was in charge of the Royal Commission into the Black Flag Rebellion at Griqualand West which was appointed by Lord Carnarvon and sat in Kimberley in January 1876. Crossman was placed in charge of submarine defences at the War Office in 1876 and became colonel in 1878. In 1881 he was on special service to report on the defences of the principal colonies – which included a visit to New Zealand. He was on a Royal Commission to inquire into the Public Revenues of the West Indies from 1882 to 1883. He commanded the Royal Engineers in the Southern District from 1882 to 1885 and was knighted in 1884. On retirement in 1886, he became major-general. He was an associate member of Institution of Civil Engineers.

At the 1885 general election Crossman was elected Member of Parliament for Portsmouth. When the Home Rule Bill split the Liberal Party, Crossman voted against the measure and joined the Liberal Unionists, holding off a challenge from the official Liberal candidate at Portsmouth in 1886. He did not seek re-election in 1892. He was High Sheriff of Northumberland in 1894.

Crossman's official residence was Cheswick, Beal, Northumberland, but he died in Plymouth at the age of 70.

== Family ==
Crossman married Catherine Josephine Morley (the daughter of John Lawrence Morley) in Albany, Western Australia on 3 March 1855. They had six children, including sons Robert and Lawrence, and daughters Mary and Alice. On 29 June 1899, he married Annie Richards.

== Legacy ==
Crossman Road in Kimberley South Africa is named after him.

Parliament of the United Kingdom
Preceded by Thomas Bruce; Sir Henry Drummond Wolff	Member of Parliament for Portsmouth; 1885 – 1892; With: Philip Vanderbyl to 1886; Sir Samuel Wilson from 1886	Succeeded by Sir John Baker; Walter Clough
