= Lady Sarah Wilson =

British war correspondent (1865–1929)

Lady Sarah Wilson RRC
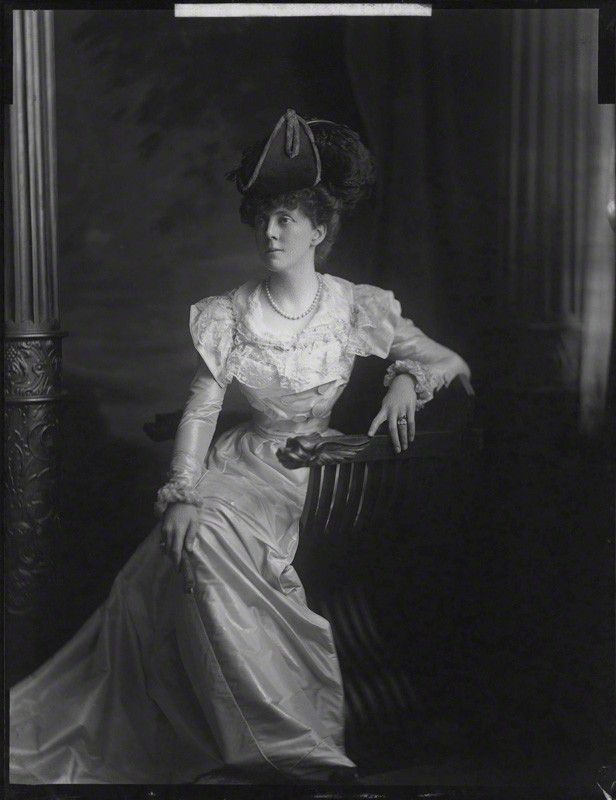
- 1893 photograph of Lady Sarah
- Born: 4 July 1865; Blenheim Palace, Oxfordshire, England
- Died: 22 October 1929 (aged 64); London, England
- Occupation: War correspondent
- Spouse: Gordon Chesney Wilson (m. 1891; died 1914)
- Children: Randolph Gordon Wilson
- Parents: John Spencer-Churchill, 7th Duke of Marlborough (father); Lady Frances Vane (mother)
- Relatives: Spencer-Churchill family

Lady Sarah Isabella Augusta Wilson (née Spencer-Churchill; 4 July 1865 – 22 October 1929) became one of the first female war correspondents in 1899, when she was recruited by Alfred Harmsworth to cover the Siege of Mafeking for the Daily Mail during the Second Boer War.

== Family ==
Born on 4 July 1865 at Blenheim Palace, Lady Sarah Spencer-Churchill was the youngest of the eleven children of John Spencer-Churchill, 7th Duke of Marlborough, and his wife, the former Lady Frances Vane, daughter of the 3rd Marquess of Londonderry. Her eldest brother was George Spencer-Churchill, 8th Duke of Marlborough, and another brother was Lord Randolph Churchill, father of the Prime Minister Winston Churchill. Anne, Duchess of Roxburghe, was her elder sister.

She married Gordon Chesney Wilson of the Royal Horse Guards, son of Jennie Campbell and Sir Samuel Wilson, MP. (Note: Her husband had also witnessed the attack by Roderick Maclean on Queen Victoria, and was called, an Eton school boy, to the Berkshire Assizes to testify at the trial. See Christ-Church Oxford Memorials, Gordon Wilson, Accessed 5 September 2015.) Her husband was killed in action on 6 November 1914, at the First Battle of Ypres. They had one son, Randolph Gordon Wilson (1893–1956).

== Siege of Mafeking correspondent ==
The Daily Mail newspaper recruited Lady Sarah after one of its correspondents, Ralph Hellawell, was arrested by the Boers as he tried to get out of the besieged town of Mafeking to send his dispatch. She was in the right place at the right time to step into the journalistic breach, having moved to Mafeking with her husband, Captain Gordon Chesney Wilson, at the start of the war, where he was aide-de-camp to Col. Robert Baden-Powell, the commanding officer at Mafeking. Baden-Powell asked her to leave Mafeking for her own safety after the Boers threatened to storm the British garrison. This she duly did, and set off on a madcap adventure in the company of her maid, travelling through the South African countryside. Eventually, she was captured by the Boers and returned to the town in exchange for a horse thief being held there.

When she re-entered Mafeking, she found it had not been attacked as predicted. Instead, over 6 kilometres (4 mi) of trenches had been dug and 800 bomb shelters built to protect residents from the constant shelling of the town. During her stay in the city, she also helped with nursing in a convalescent hospital, and was slightly wounded when it was shelled by Boer forces in late January 1900.

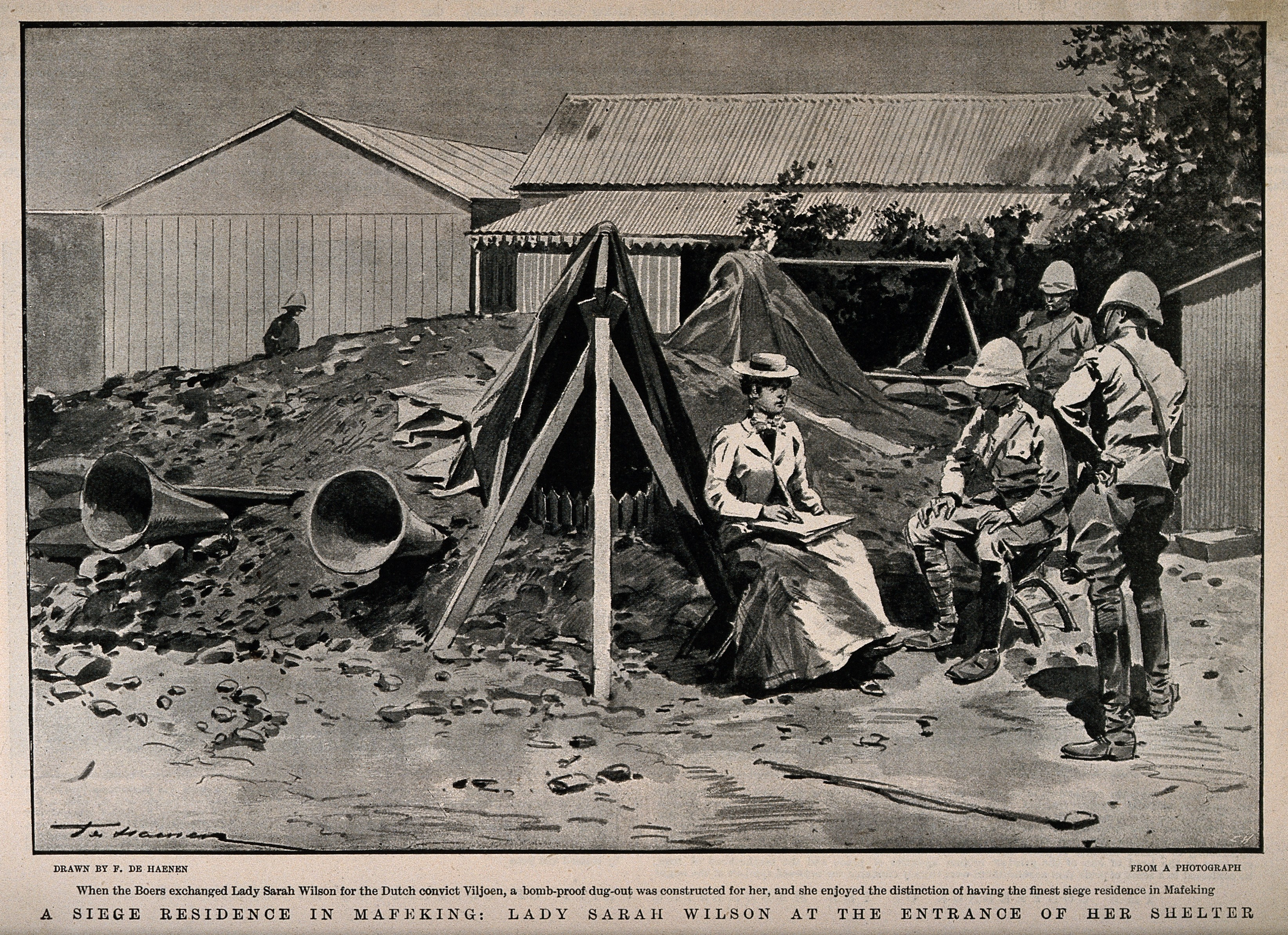
Three soldiers talk with Sarah Wilson in Mafeking. She is seated by the door to her bomb shelter.

On 26 March 1900, toward the end of the siege, she wrote:

The Boers have been extremely active during the last few days. Yesterday we were heavily shelled and suffered eight casualties … Corporal Ironside had his thigh smashed the day before, and Private Webbe, of the Cape Police, had his head blown off in the brickfields trenches.

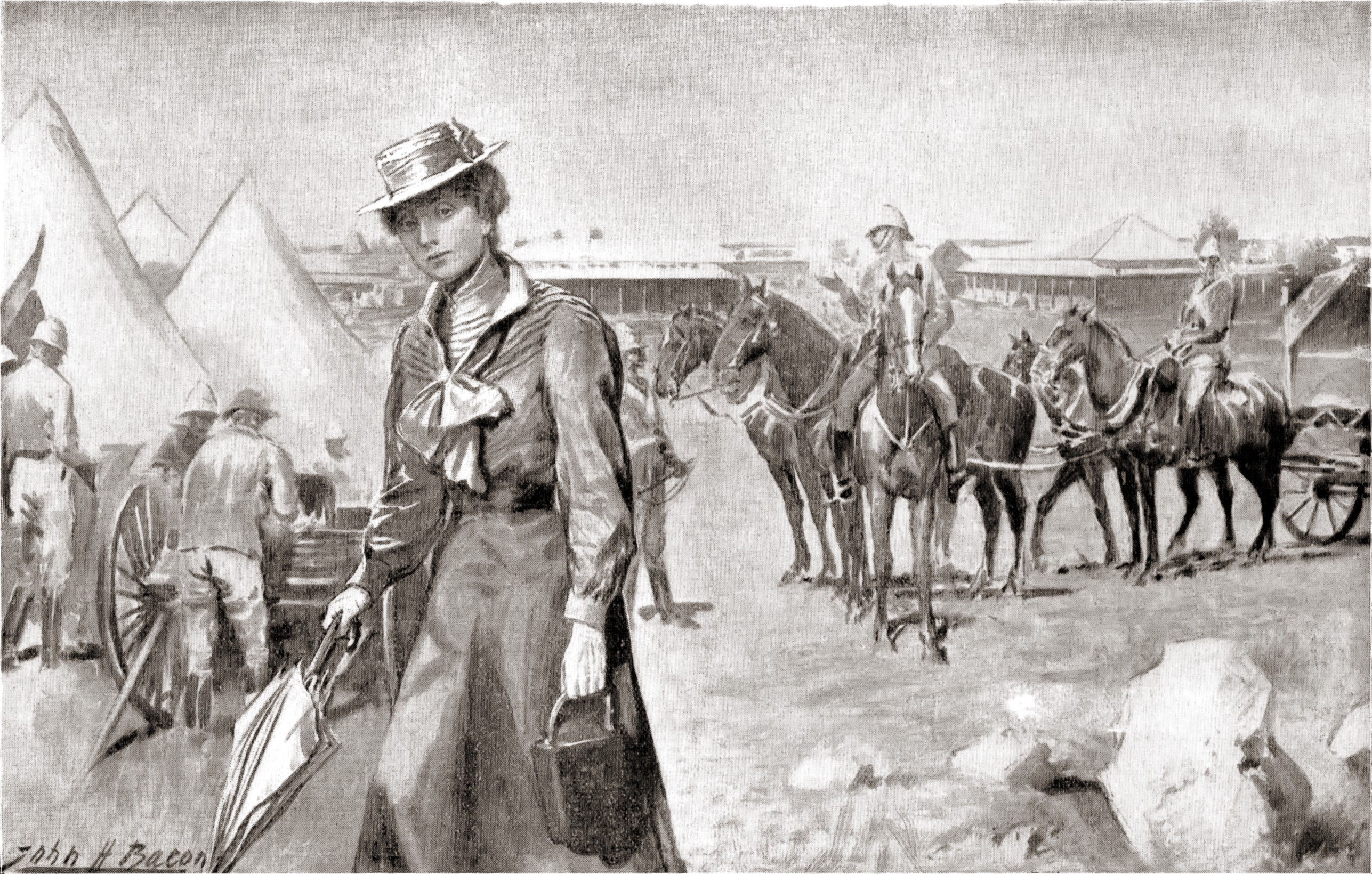
Lady Sarah Wilson during the Siege of Mafeking during the Second Boer War

Although death and destruction surrounded her, the Mail's fledgling war correspondent preferred not to dwell too much on the horrors of the siege. She described cycling events held on Sundays and the town’s celebration of Colonel Baden-Powell’s birthday, which was declared a holiday. Despite these cheery events, dwindling food supplies became a constant theme in the stories she sent back to the Mail and the situation seemed hopeless when the garrison was hit by an outbreak of malarial typhoid. In this weakened state the Boers managed to penetrate the outskirts of the town, but the British stood firm and repelled the assault.

The siege finally ended after 217 days, when the Royal Horse and Canadian Artillery galloped into Mafeking on 17 May 1900. Only a few people standing in a dusty road, singing "Rule, Britannia!", were there to greet their saviours. But in London it was a different scene as more than 20,000 people turned out in the streets to celebrate the relief of Mafeking. (Note: The boisterous celebration ensuing from the lifting of the siege created the word, to maffick, for extravagant and public celebrations).See Pall Mall Gaz. 21 May 2/2 "We trust Cape Town..will ‘maffick’ to-day, if we may coin a word, as we at home did on Friday and Saturday." Complete definition: "To celebrate uproariously, rejoice extravagantly, esp. on an occasion of national celebration (originally the relief of the British garrison besieged in Mafeking (now Mafikeng), South Africa, in May 1900). In later use usually with pejorative connotations." "maffick, v." OED Online. Oxford University Press, June 2015. Web. 5 September 2015.)

== Later life ==
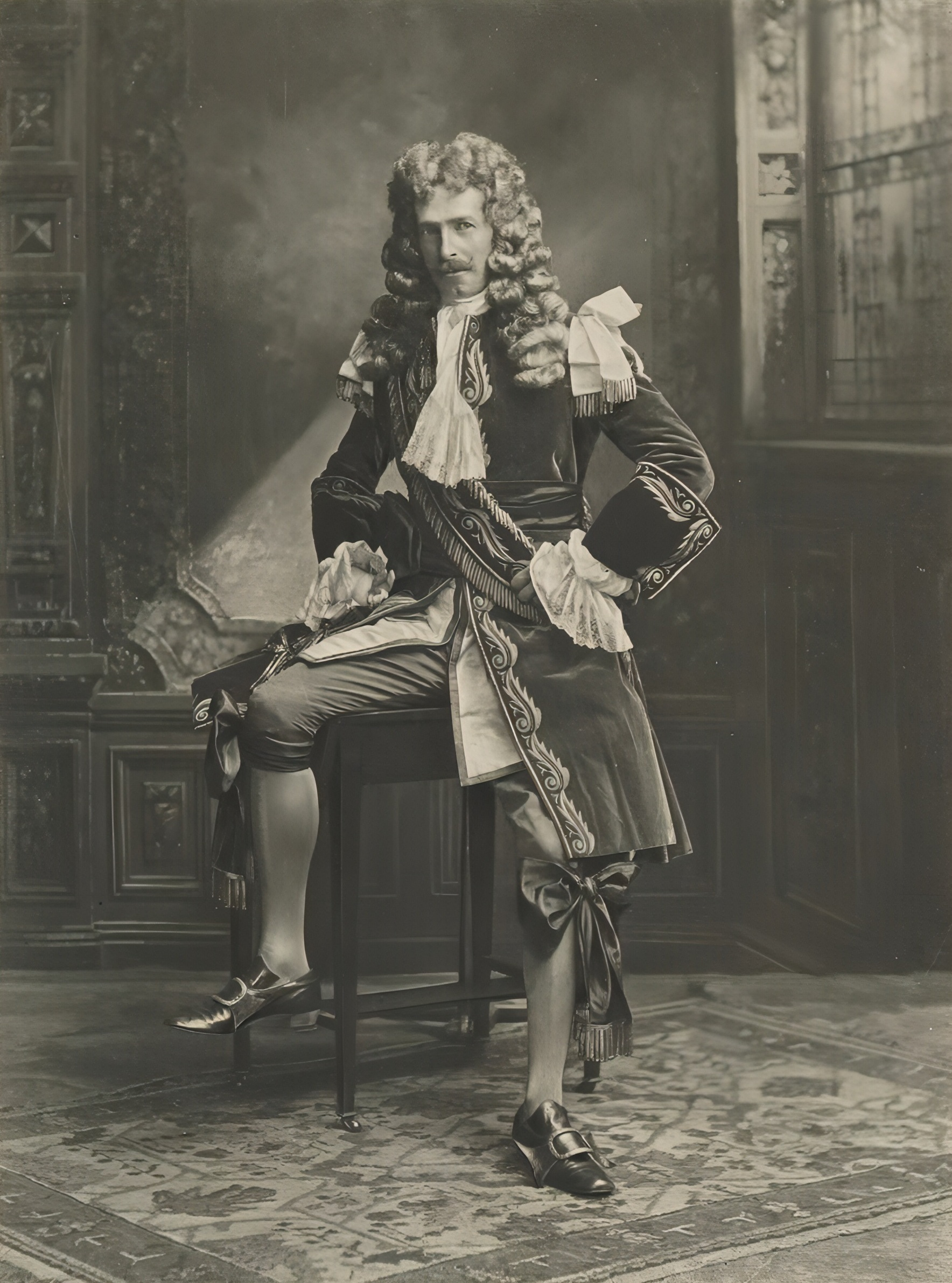
Wilson's husband at the Devonshire House Ball of 1897

In May 1901, Wilson was invested as a Dame of Grace of The Most Venerable Order of the Hospital of Saint John of Jerusalem (DStJ), and in December the same year King Edward VII personally conferred on her the decoration of the Royal Red Cross (RRC) for her services in Mafeking.

She returned to South Africa with her sister Countess Howe from September to November 1902. The Countess (as Lady Georgina Curzon) had throughout the war been involved with raising money for the Imperial Yeomanry Hospital.

At the outbreak of the First World War, Lady Sarah went to France and was running a hospital for injured soldiers in Boulogne when she received the news of her husband's death at Klein Zillebeke. Gordon's brother Herbert who served in the same regiment sent Gordon's personal effects to Lady Sarah. In Gordon's writing case, she found a newspaper cutting containing lines from the 17th-century gravestone of James Handley. It reads:

This world is a city full of crooked streets
Death is a market place where all men meet.
If life were merchandise that men could buy
Rich men would ever live and poor men die

The lines are an adaptation from William Shakespeare's The Two Noble Kinsmen. Lady Sarah chose the lines “Life is a city of crooked streets/Death the market place where all men meet” for Gordon Wilson's headstone.

== Notes and references ==
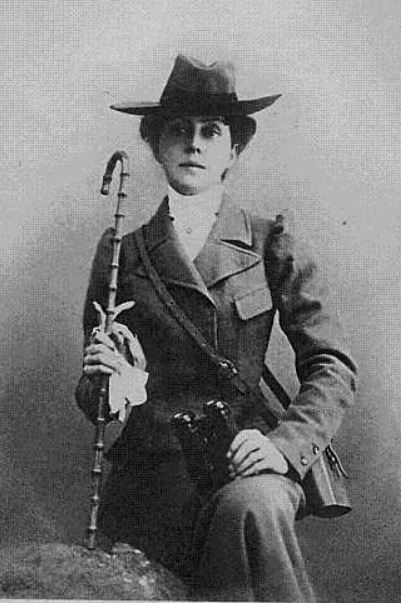
Sarah Wilson, circa 1899.

=== Citations ===
- Brian Roberts (1970). Churchills in Africa. Hamish Hamilton. ISBN 978-0-241-01901-6.
- Brian Roberts (1991). Those Bloody Women: Three Heroines of the Boer War. John Murray. ISBN 978-0-719-54858-1.
- S. J. Taylor (1996). The Great Outsiders: Northcliffe, Rothermere and the Daily Mail. Weidenfeld & Nicolson. ISBN 0-7538-0455-7.
