= James Majendie =

British politician

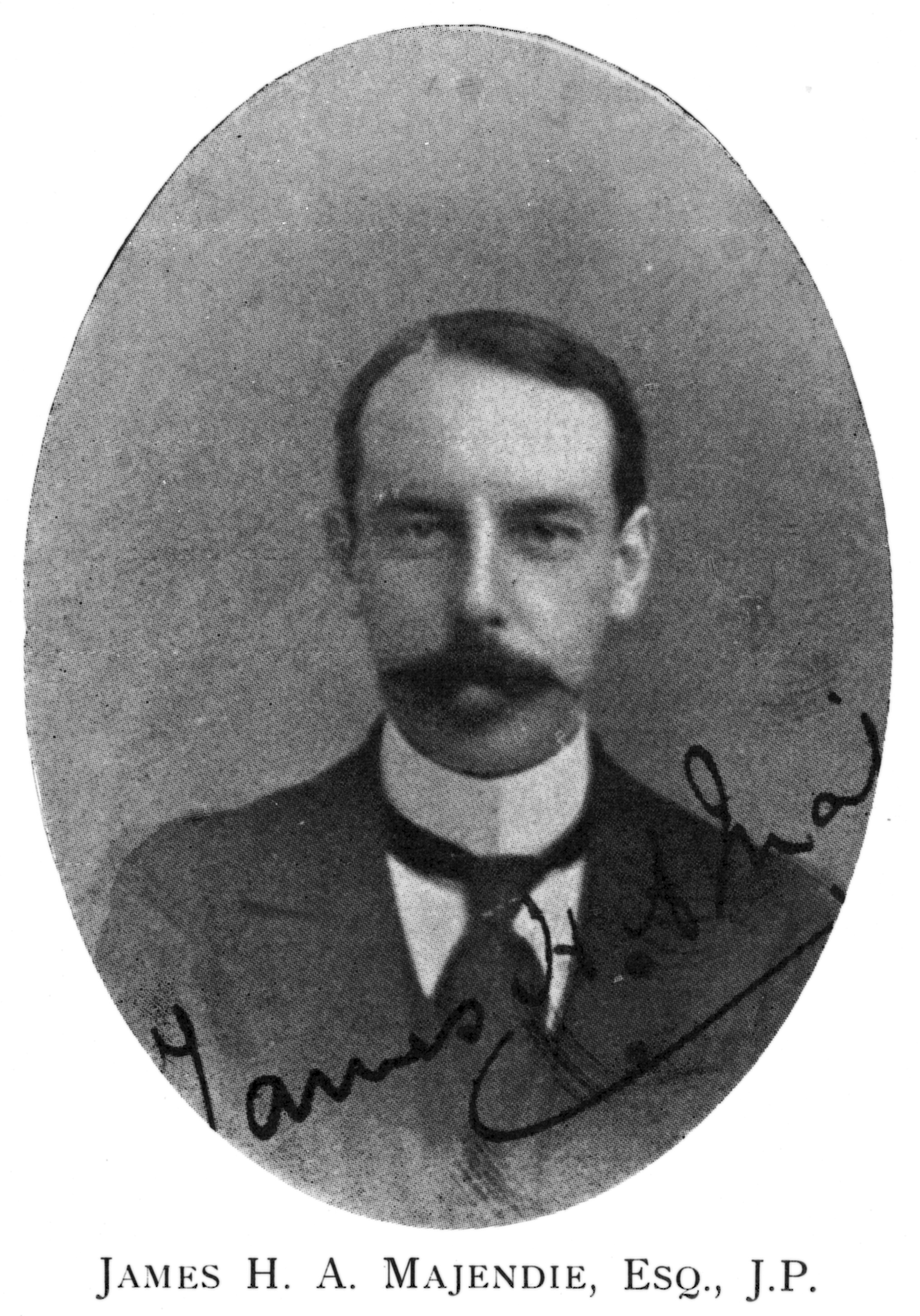
James Majendie in 1906 or earlier

James Henry Alexander Majendie (1871 – 12 January 1939) was a British Conservative Party politician.

In August 1897 he was appointed a Deputy Lieutenant of the County of Essex.

He was elected to the House of Commons at the general election in October 1900, having unsuccessfully contested the seat at a by-election in May 1900.

In the 1901 Census of London Majendie is listed as a 29-year-old Member of Parliament living at 3, Queens Arms Gate, Westminster, London with his wife Beatrice and two sons.

He did not contest the 1906 general election.

In 1912 Majendie, described as a Gentleman of no occupation and living at Hedingham Castle, Castle Hedingham in Essex was declared bankrupt In 1914 another Bankruptcy petition was raised against him by two money lenders.

Majendie died in the Kerrier Registration district of Cornwall on 12 January 1939 aged 68.

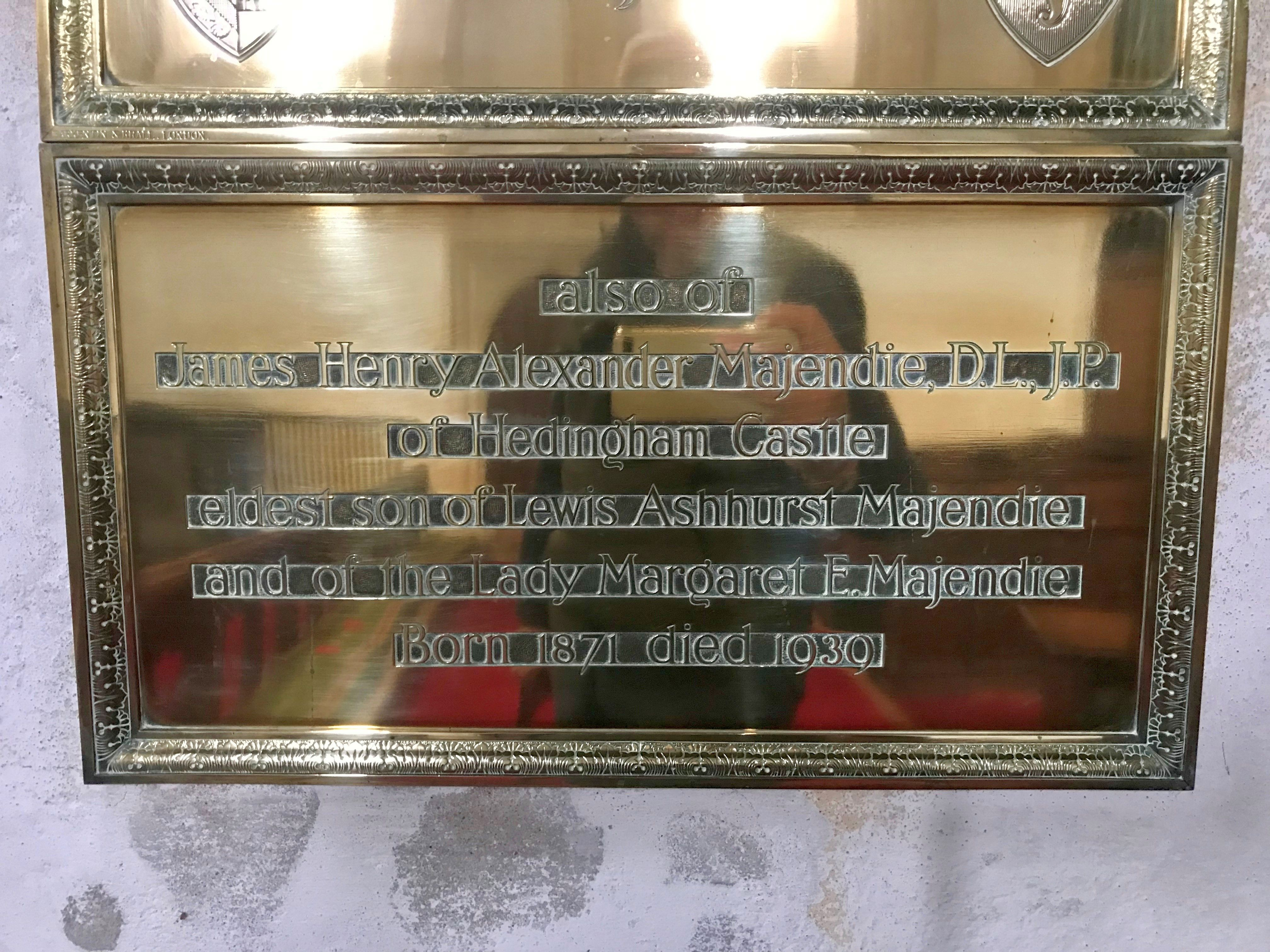
Memorial to James Majendie in St Nicholas' Church, Castle Hedingham, Essex

Parliament of the United Kingdom
| Preceded by Sir John Baker; Thomas Bramsdon | Member of Parliament for Portsmouth; 1900 – 1906; With: Reginald Lucas | Succeeded by Sir John Baker; Thomas Bramsdon |
