= Hugh Hinshelwood =

Scottish communist activist and trade unionist

Hugh Hinshelwood (13 October 1870 – 1951) was a Scottish communist activist and trade unionist.

Born in Glasgow, Hinshelwood became a fitter at an ironworks, and joined the Social Democratic Federation (SDF) and the Amalgamated Society of Engineers (ASE). In 1905, he was elected to the SDF's executive committee. He remained active in the party as it became the British Socialist Party (BSP), within which he played a prominent role in the city's movement of unemployed workers. John Maclean regarded himself as being Hinshelwood's "lieutenant", and noted that Hinshelwood taught him how to fight, when demonstrations of unemployed workers were attacked by police.

Within the BSP, Hinshelwood formed part of the anti-World War I majority, and he was active in the Red Clydeside movement. By the 1918 UK general election, the BSP had affiliated to the Labour Party, and Hinshelwood was selected to contest Portsmouth Central. While this seat was at the other end of the country, the party hoped that his experience of maintaining ships would appeal to the city's workers. He ultimately took third place, with 19.1% of the vote.

The BSP became a founding element of the Communist Party of Great Britain (CPGB), for which Hinshelwood was elected to Greenock Town Council. He also came to chair the Scottish Labour College, and was on the executive of the Greenock Central Co-operative Society. In 1925, he and fellow communist Charles Gillies were arrested on a charge of inciting police to go on strike, in contravention of the Police Act 1919, and they were both sentenced to sixty days in prison and a £10 fine.

On release, Hinshelwood remained active in the CPGB, but devoted more time to the Amalgamated Engineering Union, successor of the ASE. He represented it at the 1930 Trades Union Congress, at which he spoke in support of unemployed workers who had formed an unofficial delegation, but was soon excluded from the event for interrupting speakers.
