= List of electoral wards in Hampshire =

This is a list of electoral divisions and wards in the ceremonial county of Hampshire in South East England. All changes since the re-organisation of local government following the passing of the Local Government Act 1972 are shown. The number of councillors elected for each electoral division or ward is shown in brackets.

== County council ==
=== Hampshire ===
Electoral Divisions from 1 April 1974 (first election 12 April 1973) to 7 May 1981:

1. Aldershot East (1)
2. Aldershot West (1)
3. Alton (1)
4. Andover North (1)
5. Andover Rural (1)
6. Andover South (1)
7. Baddesley (1)
8. Basingstoke East (1)
9. Basingstoke North (1)
10. Basingstoke West (1)
11. Battins & Bondfield (1)
12. Bedhampton & Barncroft (1)
13. Bishops Waltham & Droxford (1)
14. Bramshott (1)
15. Brockenhurst (1)
16. Candover (1)
17. Catherington (1)
18. Eastleigh East (1)
19. Eastleigh North (1)
20. Eastleigh South (1)
21. Fareham East (1)
22. Fareham North East (1)
23. Fareham South West (1)
24. Fareham Titchfield (1)
25. Fareham West (1)
26. Farnborough East (1)
27. Farnborough West (1)
28. Fawley (1)
29. Fleet (1)
30. Gosport Alverstoke (1)
31. Gosport Elson (1)
32. Gosport Hardway (1)
33. Gosport Leesland (1)
34. Gosport Town (1)
35. Hart Plain & Cowplain (1)
36. Hartley Wintney (1)
37. Havant & Warblington (1)
38. Hayling (1)
39. Headley (1)
40. Hythe (1)
41. Kingsclere & Whitchurch No. 1 (High (1)
42. Kingsclere & Whitchurch No. 2 (King (1)
43. Loddon (1)
44. Lymington Central (1)
45. Lymington East (1)
46. Lymington West (1)
47. Lyndhurst (1)
48. Medstead & Selborne (1)
49. Odiham (1)
50. Petersfield (1)
51. Portsmouth No. 1 (2)
52. Portsmouth No. 2 (North End) (1)
53. Portsmouth No. 3 (Paulsgrove) (1)
54. Portsmouth No. 4 (Cosham) (1)
55. Portsmouth No. 5 (Farlington) (1)
56. Portsmouth No. 6 (Meredith) (1)
57. Portsmouth No. 7 (St Thomas) (1)
58. Portsmouth No. 8 (Buckland) (1)
59. Portsmouth No. 9 (Kingston) (1)
60. Portsmouth No. 10 (Highland) (1)
61. Portsmouth No. 11 (Havelock) (1)
62. Portsmouth No. 12 (St Simon) (1)
63. Portsmouth No. 13 (St Jude) (1)
64. Portsmouth No. 14 (Fratton) (1)
65. Purbrook & Waterloo (1)
66. Ringwood & Fordingbridge No. 1 (1)
67. Ringwood & Fordingbridge No. 2 (1)
68. Romsey (1)
69. Southampton No. 1 (1)
70. Southampton No. 2 (1)
71. Southampton No. 3 (St Denys & Bitt (1)
72. Southampton No. 4 (Swaythling) (1)
73. Southampton No. 5 (Pear Tree & Bitt (1)
74. Southampton No. 6 (Woolston) (1)
75. Southampton No. 7 (Harefield) (1)
76. Southampton No. 8 (Bitterne) (1)
77. Southampton No. 9 (Sholing) (1)
78. Southampton No. 10 (Banister) (1)
79. Southampton No. 11 (Millbrook) (1)
80. Southampton No. 12 (Coxford) (1)
81. Southampton No. 13 (Shirley) (1)
82. Southampton No. 14 (Portswood) (1)
83. Southampton No. 15 (Bassett) (1)
84. Southampton No. 16 (Redbridge) (1)
85. Stockbridge (1)
86. Stockheath & Leigh Park (1)
87. Totton (1)
88. Wickham (1)
89. Winchester (St Bart St John St M (1)
90. Winchester (St Paul & St Thomas) (1)
91. Winchester Rural No. 1 (Alresford) (1)
92. Winchester Rural No. 2 (Hound) (1)
93. Winchester Rural No. 3 (Micheldever (1)
94. Winchester Rural No. 4 (1)
95. Winchester Rural No. 5 (1)
96. Yateley & Hawley (1)

Electoral Divisions from 7 May 1981 to 5 May 2005:

1. Aldershot North (1)
2. Aldershot South (1)
3. Alton (1)
4. Andover North (1)
5. Andover Rural (1)
6. Andover South (1)
7. Baddesley (1)
8. Bargate (1); electoral division abolished in 1997
9. Barncroft & Warren Park (1)
10. Basingstoke East (1)
11. Basingstoke North (1)
12. Basingstoke North West (1)
13. Basingstoke South (1)
14. Basingstoke West (1)
15. Bassett (1); electoral division abolished in 1997
16. Battins & Bondfields (1)
17. Bedhampton & St Faiths W. (1)
18. Bishops Waltham (1)
19. Bishopstoke & Central (1)
20. Bitterne (1); electoral division abolished in 1997
21. Bitterne Park (1); electoral division abolished in 1997
22. Botley & Hedge End (1)
23. Bramshott (1)
24. Brockenhurst (1)
25. Candovers (1)
26. Catherington (1)
27. Chandlers Ford (1)
28. Charles Dickens (1); electoral division abolished in 1997
29. Copnor (1); electoral division abolished in 1997
30. Cosham (1); electoral division abolished in 1997
31. Cowplain & Hart Plain (1)
32. Coxford (1); electoral division abolished in 1997
33. Dibden & Hythe (1)
34. Downlands (1)
35. Drayton & Farlington (1); electoral division abolished in 1997
36. Eastgate (1)
37. Emsworth & St Faiths East (1)
38. Fair Oak & West End (1)
39. Fareham Crofton (1)
40. Fareham North West (1)
41. Fareham Portchester (1)
42. Fareham South East (1)
43. Fareham Titchfield (1)
44. Fareham Western Wards (1)
45. Farnborough North (1)
46. Farnborough South (1)
47. Farnborough West (1)
48. Fawley (1)
49. Fleet (1)
50. Fordingbridge (1)
51. Fratton (1); electoral division abolished in 1997
52. Freemantle (1); electoral division abolished in 1997
53. Gosport Town (1)
54. Hardway (1)
55. Harefield (1); electoral division abolished in 1997
56. Hartley Wintney (1)
57. Havelock (1); electoral division abolished in 1997
58. Hawley & Church Crookham (1)
59. Hayling Island (1)
60. Headley (1)
61. Highland (1); electoral division abolished in 1997
62. Hilsea (1); electoral division abolished in 1997
63. Hound (1)
64. Itchen Valley (1)
65. Kingsclere & Tadley (1)
66. Lee (1)
67. Leesland (1)
68. Loddon (1)
69. Lymington (1)
70. Lyndhurst (1)
71. Medstead & Selborne (1)
72. Meon Valley (1)
73. Milford & Hordle (1)
74. Millbrook (1); electoral division abolished in 1997
75. Milton (1); electoral division abolished in 1997
76. Nelson (1); electoral division abolished in 1997
77. New Milton (1)
78. North (1)
79. Odiham (1)
80. Paulsgrove (1); electoral division abolished in 1997
81. Peartree (1); electoral division abolished in 1997
82. Petersfield (1)
83. Portswood (1); electoral division abolished in 1997
84. Purbrook & Stakes South (1)
85. Redbridge (1); electoral division abolished in 1997
86. Ringwood (1)
87. Romsey (1)
88. Rowner (1)
89. Shirley (1); electoral division abolished in 1997
90. Sholing (1); electoral division abolished in 1997
91. South (1)
92. St Jude (1); electoral division abolished in 1997
93. St Lukes (1); electoral division abolished in 1997
94. St Thomas (1); electoral division abolished in 1997
95. Stockbridge & Wellow (1)
96. Totton North (1)
97. Totton South (1)
98. Waterloo & Stakes North (1)
99. Westgate (1)
100. Whitchurch & Clere (1)
101. Woolston (1); electoral division abolished in 1997
102. Yateley (1)

Electoral Divisions from 5 May 2005 to 4 May 2017:

1. Aldershot East (1)
2. Aldershot West (1)
3. Alton Rural (1)
4. Alton Town (1)
5. Andover North (1)
6. Andover South (1)
7. Andover West (1)
8. Baddesley (1)
9. Basingstoke Central (1)
10. Basingstoke North (1)
11. Basingstoke North West (1)
12. Basingstoke South East (1)
13. Basingstoke South West (1)
14. Bedhampton & Leigh Park (2)
15. Bishops Waltham (1)
16. Bishopstoke & Fair Oak (1)
17. Bordon, Whitehill & Lindford (1)
18. Botley & Hedge End (1)
19. Bridgemary (1)
20. Brockenhurst (1)
21. Calleva & Kingsclere (1)
22. Candovers (1)
23. Catherington (1)
24. Chandler’s Ford (1)
25. Church Crookham & Ewshot (1)
26. Cowplain & Hart Plain (1)
27. Dibden & Hythe (1)
28. Eastleigh East (1)
29. Eastleigh West (1)
30. Emsworth & St Faith's (1)
31. Fareham Crofton (1)
32. Fareham Portchester (1)
33. Fareham Sarisbury (1)
34. Fareham Titchfield (1)
35. Fareham Town (2)
36. Fareham Warsash (1)
37. Farnborough North (1)
38. Farnborough South (1)
39. Farnborough West (1)
40. Fleet (1)
41. Fordingbridge (1)
42. Hamble (1)
43. Hardway (1)
44. Hartley Wintney, Eversley & Yateley West (1)
45. Hayling Island (1)
46. Headley (1)
47. Itchen Valley (1)
48. Lee (1)
49. Leesland & Town (2)
50. Loddon (1)
51. Lymington (1)
52. Lyndhurst (1)
53. Meon Valley (1)
54. Milford & Hordle (1)
55. New Milton (1)
56. Odiham (1)
57. Petersfield Butser (1)
58. Petersfield Hangers (1)
59. Purbrook & Stakes South (1)
60. Ringwood (1)
61. Romsey Extra (1)
62. Romsey Town (1)
63. South Waterside (1)
64. Tadley & Baughurst (1)
65. Test Valley Central (1)
66. Totton North (1)
67. Totton South & Marchwood (1)
68. Waterloo & Stakes North (1)
69. West End & Hedge End Grange Park (1)
70. Whitchurch & Clere (1)
71. Winchester Downlands (1)
72. Winchester Eastgate (1)
73. Winchester Southern Parishes (1)
74. Winchester Westgate (1)
75. Yateley East, Blackwater & Ancells (1)

Electoral Divisions from 4 May 2017 to present:

1. Aldershot North (1)
2. Aldershot South (1)
3. Alton Rural (1)
4. Alton Town (1)
5. Andover North (1)
6. Andover South (1)
7. Andover West (1)
8. Baddesley (1)
9. Basingstoke Central (1)
10. Basingstoke North (1)
11. Basingstoke North West (1)
12. Basingstoke South East (1)
13. Basingstoke South West (1)
14. Bishops Waltham (1)
15. Bishopstoke & Fair Oak (1)
16. Botley & Hedge End North (1)
17. Bridgemary (1)
18. Brockenhurst (1)
19. Calleva (1)
20. Candovers, Oakley & Overton (1)
21. Catherington (1)
22. Chandler's Ford (1)
23. Church Crookham & Ewshot (1)
24. Cowplain & Hart Plain (1)
25. Dibden & Hythe (1)
26. Eastleigh North (1)
27. Eastleigh South (1)
28. Emsworth & St Faiths (1)
29. Fareham Crofton (1)
30. Fareham Portchester (1)
31. Fareham Sarisbury (1)
32. Fareham Titchfield (1)
33. Fareham Town (2)
34. Fareham Warsash (1)
35. Farnborough North (1)
36. Farnborough South (1)
37. Farnborough West (1)
38. Fleet Town (1)
39. Hamble (1)
40. Hardway (1)
41. Hartley Wintney & Yateley West (1)
42. Hayling Island (1)
43. Hedge End & West End South (1)
44. Itchen Valley (1)
45. Lee (1)
46. Leesland & Town (2)
47. Liphook, Headley & Grayshott (1)
48. Loddon (1)
49. Lymington & Boldre (1)
50. Lyndhurst & Fordingbridge (1)
51. Meon Valley (1)
52. New Milton (1)
53. New Milton North, Milford & Hordle (1)
54. North East Havant (1)
55. North West Havant (1)
56. Odiham & Hook (1)
57. Petersfield Butser (1)
58. Petersfield Hangers (1)
59. Purbrook & Stakes South (1)
60. Ringwood (1)
61. Romsey Rural (1)
62. Romsey Town (1)
63. South Waterside (1)
64. Tadley & Baughurst (1)
65. Test Valley Central (1)
66. Totton North & Netley Marsh (1)
67. Totton South & Marchwood (1)
68. Waterloo & Stakes North (1)
69. West End & Horton Heath (1)
70. Whitchurch & The Cleres (1)
71. Whitehill, Bordon & Lindford (1)
72. Winchester Downlands (1)
73. Winchester Eastgate (1)
74. Winchester Southern Parishes (1)
75. Winchester Westgate (1)
76. Yateley East & Blackwater (1)

== Unitary authority councils ==
=== Portsmouth ===
Wards from 1 April 1974 (first election 7 June 1973) to 5 May 1983:

Wards from 5 May 1983 to 2 May 2002:

Wards from 2 May 2002 to present:

1. Baffins (3)
2. Central Southsea (3)
3. Charles Dickens (3)
4. Copnor (3)
5. Cosham (3)
6. Drayton & Farlington (3)
7. Eastney & Craneswater (3)
8. Fratton (3)
9. Hilsea (3)
10. Milton (3)
11. Nelson (3)
12. Paulsgrove (3)
13. St Jude (3)
14. St Thomas (3)

=== Southampton ===
Wards from 1 April 1974 (first election 7 June 1973) to 3 May 1979:

Wards from 3 May 1979 to 2 May 2002:

Wards from 2 May 2002 to 4 May 2023:

1. Bargate (3)
2. Bassett (3)
3. Bevois (3)
4. Bitterne (3)
5. Bitterne Park (3)
6. Coxford (3)
7. Freemantle (3)
8. Harefield (3)
9. Millbrook (3)
10. Peartree (3)
11. Portswood (3)
12. Redbridge (3)
13. Shirley (3)
14. Sholing (3)
15. Swaythling (3)
16. Woolston (3)

Wards from 4 May 2023 to present:

1. Banister & Polygon (3)
2. Bargate (3)
3. Bassett (3)
4. Bevois (3)
5. Bitterne Park (3)
6. Coxford (3)
7. Freemantle (3)
8. Harefield (3)
9. Millbrook (3)
10. Peartree (3)
11. Portswood (3)
12. Redbridge (3)
13. Shirley (3)
14. Sholing (3)
15. Swaythling (3)
16. Thornhill (3)
17. Woolston (3)

== District councils ==
=== Basingstoke and Deane ===
Wards from 1 April 1974 (first election 7 June 1973) to 6 May 1976:

Wards from 6 May 1976 to 7 May 1992:

Wards from 7 May 1992 to 2 May 2002:

1. Basing (3)
2. Baughurst & Heath End (2)
3. Brighton Hill (3)
4. Brookvale (2)
5. Buckskin (2)
6. Burghclere (1)
7. Calleva (3)
8. Chineham (3)
9. Eastrop (2)
10. East Woodhay (1)
11. Grove (2)
12. Hatch Warren (3)
13. Highclere & Bourne (1)
14. Kempshott (3)
15. Kingsclere (2)
16. Norden (3)
17. Oakley & North Waltham (3)
18. Overton & Laverstoke (2)
19. Popley (3)
20. Sherborne St John (1)
21. South Ham (3)
22. Tadley (3)
23. Upton Grey (1)
24. Whitchurch (2)
25. Winklebury (3)

Wards from 2 May 2002 to 1 May 2008:

1. Basing (3)
2. Baughurst (1)
3. Brighton Hill North (2)
4. Brighton Hill South (2)
5. Brookvale & Kings Furlong (2)
6. Buckskin (2)
7. Burghclere (1)
8. Calleva (2)
9. Chineham (3)
10. East Woodhay (1)
11. Eastrop (2)
12. Grove (2)
13. Hatch Warren & Beggarwood (3)
14. Highclere & Bourne (1)
15. Kempshott (3)
16. Kingsclere (2)
17. Norden (3)
18. Oakley & North Waltham (3)
19. Overton, Laverstoke & Steventon (2)
20. Pamber (1)
21. Popley East (2)
22. Popley West (2)
23. Rooksdown (1)
24. Sherborne St John (1)
25. South Ham (3)
26. Tadley North (2)
27. Tadley South (2)
28. Upton Grey & The Candovers (1)
29. Whitchurch (2)
30. Winklebury (3)

Wards from 1 May 2008 to 6 May 2021:

1. Basing (3)
2. Baughurst & Tadley North (2)
3. Bramley & Sherfield (2)
4. Brighton Hill North (2)
5. Brighton Hill South (2)
6. Brookvale & Kings Furlong (2)
7. Buckskin (2)
8. Burghclere, Highclere & St Mary Bourne (2)
9. Chineham (3)
10. East Woodhay (1)
11. Eastrop (2)
12. Grove (2)
13. Hatch Warren & Beggarwood (3)
14. Kempshott (3)
15. Kingsclere (2)
16. Norden (3)
17. Oakley & North Waltham (3)
18. Overton, Laverstoke & Steventon (2)
19. Pamber & Silchester (2)
20. Popley East (2)
21. Popley West (2)
22. Rooksdown (1)
23. Sherborne St John (1)
24. South Ham (3)
25. Tadley Central (1)
26. Tadley South (2)
27. Upton Grey & The Candovers (1)
28. Whitchurch (2)
29. Winklebury (2)

Wards from 6 May 2021 to present:

1. Basing & Upton Grey (3)
2. Bramley (3)
3. Brighton Hill (3)
4. Brookvale & Kings Furlong (3)
5. Chineham (3)
6. Eastrop & Grove (3)
7. Evingar (3)
8. Hatch Warren & Beggarwood (3)
9. Kempshott & Buckskin (3)
10. Norden (3)
11. Oakley & The Candovers (3)
12. Popley (3)
13. Sherborne St John & Rooksdown (3)
14. South Ham (3)
15. Tadley & Pamber (3)
16. Tadley North, Kingsclere & Baughurst (3)
17. Whitchurch, Overton & Laverstoke (3)
18. Winklebury & Manydown (3)

=== East Hampshire ===
Wards from 1 April 1974 (first election 7 June 1973) to 3 May 1979:

Wards from 3 May 1979 to 1 May 2003:

Wards from 1 May 2003 to 2 May 2019:

1. Alton Amery (1)
2. Alton Ashdell (1)
3. Alton Eastbrooke (1)
4. Alton Westbrooke (1)
5. Alton Whitedown (1)
6. Alton Wooteys (1)
7. Binsted & Bentley (1)
8. Bramshott & Liphook (3)
9. Clanfield & Finchdean (2)
10. Downland (1)
11. East Meon (1)
12. Four Marks & Medstead (2)
13. Froxfield & Steep (1)
14. Grayshott (1)
15. Headley (2)
16. Holybourne & Froyle (1)
17. Horndean Catherington & Lovedean (1)
18. Horndean Downs (1)
19. Horndean Hazleton & Blendworth (1)
20. Horndean Kings (1)
21. Horndean Murray (1)
22. Lindford (1)
23. Liss (2)
24. Petersfield Bell Hill (1)
25. Petersfield Causeway (1)
26. Petersfield Heath (1)
27. Petersfield Rother (1)
28. Petersfield St Marys (1)
29. Petersfield St Peters (1)
30. Rowlands Castle (1)
31. Ropley & Tisted (1)
32. Selborne (1)
33. The Hangers & Forest (1)
34. Whitehill Chase (1)
35. Whitehill Deadwater (1)
36. Whitehill Hogmoor (1)
37. Whitehill Pinewood (1)
38. Whitehill Walldown (1)

Wards from 2 May 2019 to present:

1. Alton Amery (1)
2. Alton Ashdell (1)
3. Alton Eastbrooke (1)
4. Alton Holybourne (1)
5. Alton Westbrooke (1)
6. Alton Whitedown (1)
7. Alton Wooteys (1)
8. Bentworth & Froyle (1)
9. Binsted, Bentley & Selborne (2)
10. Bramshott & Liphook (3)
11. Buriton & East Meon (1)
12. Clanfield (2)
13. Four Marks & Medstead (3)
14. Froxfield, Sheet & Steep (1)
15. Grayshott (1)
16. Headley (2)
17. Horndean Catherington (1)
18. Horndean Downs (1)
19. Horndean Kings & Blendworth (2)
20. Horndean Murray (1)
21. Lindford (1)
22. Liss (2)
23. Petersfield Bell Hill (1)
24. Petersfield Causeway (1)
25. Petersfield Heath (1)
26. Petersfield St Peter's (2)
27. Ropley, Hawkley & Hangers (1)
28. Rowlands Castle (1)
29. Whitehill Chase (2)
30. Whitehill Hogmoor & Greatham (2)
31. Whitehill Pinewood (1)

=== Eastleigh ===
Wards from 1 April 1974 (first election 7 June 1973) to 6 May 1976:

Wards from 6 May 1976 to 2 May 2002:

Wards from 2 May 2002 to 3 May 2018:

1. Bishopstoke East (2)
2. Bishopstoke West (2)
3. Botley (2)
4. Bursledon & Old Netley (3)
5. Chandler’s Ford East (2)
6. Chandler’s Ford West (2)
7. Eastleigh Central (3)
8. Eastleigh North (3)
9. Eastleigh South (3)
10. Fair Oak & Horton Heath (3)
11. Hamble-le-Rice & Butlocks Heath (2)
12. Hedge End St John's (3)
13. Hedge End Grange Park (2)
14. Hedge End Wildern (2)
15. Hiltingbury East (2)
16. Hiltingbury West (2)
17. Netley Abbey (2)
18. West End North (2)
19. West End South (2)

Wards from 3 May 2018 to present:

1. Bishopstoke (3)
2. Botley (2)
3. Bursledon & Hound North (3)
4. Chandler's Ford (3)
5. Eastleigh Central (3)
6. Eastleigh North (3)
7. Eastleigh South (3)
8. Fair Oak & Horton Heath (3)
9. Hamble & Netley (3)
10. Hedge End North (3)
11. Hedge End South (3)
12. Hiltingbury (3)
13. West End North (2)
14. West End South (2)

=== Fareham ===
Wards from 1 April 1974 (first election 7 June 1973) to 6 May 1976:

Wards from 6 May 1976 to 2 May 2002:

Wards from 2 May 2002 to 2 May 2024:

1. Fareham East (2)
2. Fareham North (2)
3. Fareham North-West (2)
4. Fareham South (2)
5. Fareham West (2)
6. Hill Head (2)
7. Locks Heath (2)
8. Park Gate (2)
9. Portchester East (3)
10. Portchester West (2)
11. Sarisbury (2)
12. Stubbington (2)
13. Titchfield (2)
14. Titchfield Common (2)
15. Warsash (2)

Wards from 2 May 2024 to present:

1. Avenue (2)
2. Fareham Park (2)
3. Fareham Town (2)
4. Fort Fareham (2)
5. Hill Head (2)
6. Hook with Warsash (2)
7. Locks Heath (2)
8. Park Gate (2)
9. Portchester Castle (2)
10. Portchester Wicor (2)
11. Sarisbury and Whiteley (2)
12. Stubbington (2)
13. Titchfield (2)
14. Titchfield Common (2)
15. Uplands and Funtley (2)
16. Wallington and Downend (2)

=== Gosport ===
Wards from 1 April 1974 (first election 7 June 1973) to 3 May 1979:

Wards from 3 May 1979 to 2 May 2002:

Wards from 2 May 2002 to 5 May 2022:

1. Alverstoke (2)
2. Anglesey (2)
3. Bridgemary North (2)
4. Bridgemary South (2)
5. Brockhurst (2)
6. Christchurch (2)
7. Elson (2)
8. Forton (2)
9. Grange (2)
10. Hardway (2)
11. Lee East (2)
12. Lee West (2)
13. Leesland (2)
14. Peel Common (2)
15. Privett (2)
16. Rowner & Holbrook (2)
17. Town (2)

Wards from 5 May 2022:

1. Alverstoke (2)
2. Anglesey (2)
3. Bridgemary (2)
4. Brockhurst & Privett (2)
5. Elson (2)
6. Forton (2)
7. Grange & Alver Valley (2)
8. Harbourside & Town (2)
9. Hardway (2)
10. Lee East (2)
11. Lee West (2)
12. Leesland & Newtown (2)
13. Peel Common (2)
14. Rowner & Holbrook (2)

=== Hart ===
Wards from 1 April 1974 (first election 7 June 1973) to 6 May 1976:

Wards from 6 May 1976 to 2 May 2002:

Wards from 2 May 2002 to 22 May 2014:

1. Blackwater & Hawley (2)
2. Church Crookham East (2)
3. Church Crookham West (2)
4. Crondall (2)
5. Eversley (1)
6. Fleet Central (2)
7. Fleet Courtmoor (2)
8. Fleet North (2)
9. Fleet Pondtail (2)
10. Fleet West (2)
11. Frogmore & Darby Green (2)
12. Hartley Wintney (2)
13. Hook (3)
14. Long Sutton (1)
15. Odiham (2)
16. Yateley East (2)
17. Yateley North (2)
18. Yateley West (2)

Wards from 22 May 2014 to present:

1. Blackwater & Hawley (3)
2. Crookham East (3)
3. Crookham West & Ewshot (3)
4. Fleet Central (3)
5. Fleet East (3)
6. Fleet West (3)
7. Hartley Wintney (3)
8. Hook (3)
9. Odiham (3)
10. Yateley East (3)
11. Yateley West (3)

=== Havant ===
Wards from 1 April 1974 (first election 7 June 1973) to 6 May 1976:

Wards from 6 May 1976 to 2 May 2002:

Wards from 2 May 2002 to 2 May 2024:

1. Barncroft (2)
2. Battins (2)
3. Bedhampton (3)
4. Bondfields (2)
5. Cowplain (3)
6. Emsworth (3)
7. Hart Plain (3)
8. Hayling East (3)
9. Hayling West (3)
10. Purbrook (3)
11. St Faith's (3)
12. Stakes (3)
13. Warren Park (2)
14. Waterloo (3)

Wards from 2 May 2024 to present:

1. Bedhampton (3)
2. Cowplain (3)
3. Emsworth (3)
4. Hart Plain (3)
5. Havant St Faith’s (3)
6. Hayling East (3)
7. Hayling West (3)
8. Leigh Park Central & West Leigh (3)
9. Leigh Park Hermitage (3)
10. Purbrook (3)
11. Stakes (3)
12. Waterloo (3)

=== New Forest ===
Wards from 1 April 1974 (first election 7 June 1973) to 6 May 1976:

Wards from 6 May 1976 to 1 May 2003:

Wards from 1 May 2003 to 4 May 2023:

1. Ashurst, Copythorne South & Netley Marsh (2)
2. Barton (2)
3. Bashley (1)
4. Becton (2)
5. Boldre & Sway (2)
6. Bramshaw, Copythorne North & Minstead (1)
7. Bransgore & Burley (2)
8. Brockenhurst & Forest South East (2)
9. Buckland (1)
10. Butts Ash & Dibden Purlieu (2)
11. Dibden & Hythe East (2)
12. Downlands & Forest (1) †
13. Fawley, Blackfield & Langley (2)
14. Fernhill (2)
15. Fordingbridge (2) †
16. Forest North West (1) †
17. Furzedown & Hardley (1)
18. Holbury & North Blackfield (2)
19. Hordle (2)
20. Hythe West & Langdown (2)
21. Lymington Town (2)
22. Lyndhurst (1)
23. Marchwood (2)
24. Milford (2)
25. Milton (2)
26. Pennington (2)
27. Ringwood East & Sopley (1)
28. Ringwood North (2)
29. Ringwood South (2)
30. Totton Central (2)
31. Totton East (2)
32. Totton North (2)
33. Totton South (2)
34. Totton West (2)

† minor boundary changes in 2011

Wards from 4 May 2023 to present:

1. Ashley, Bashley & Fernhill (2)
2. Ashurst, Bramshaw, Copythorne & Netley Marsh (2)
3. Ballard (1)
4. Barton & Becton (2)
5. Bransgore, Burley, Sopley & Ringwood East (2)
6. Brockenhurst & Denny Lodge (1)
7. Dibden & Dibden Purlieu (2)
8. Downlands & Forest North (1)
9. Fawley, Blackfield, Calshot & Langley (2)
10. Fordingbridge, Godshill & Hyde (2)
11. Forest & Solent (1)
12. Hardley, Holbury & North Blackfield (2)
13. Hythe Central (2)
14. Hythe South (2)
15. Lymington (2)
16. Lyndhurst & Minstead (1)
17. Marchwood & Eling (2)
18. Milford & Hordle (3)
19. Milton (2)
20. Pennington (2)
21. Ringwood North & Ellingham (2)
22. Ringwood South (2)
23. Sway (1)
24. Totton Central (2)
25. Totton North (3)
26. Totton South (2)

=== Rushmoor ===
Wards from 1 April 1974 (first election 7 June 1973) to 3 May 1979:

Wards from 3 May 1979 to 2 May 2002:

Wards from 2 May 2002 to 3 May 2012:

1. Cove & Southwood (3)
2. Empress (3)
3. Fernhill (3)
4. Grange (3)
5. Heron Wood (3)
6. Knellwood (3)
7. Manor Park (3)
8. Mayfield (3)
9. North Town (3)
10. Rowhill (3)
11. St John's (3)
12. St Mark's (3)
13. Wellington (3)
14. Westheath (3)

Wards from 3 May 2012 to present:

1. Aldershot Park (3)
2. Cherrywood (3)
3. Cove & Southwood (3)
4. Empress (3)
5. Fernhill (3)
6. Knellwood (3)
7. Manor Park (3)
8. North Town (3)
9. Rowhill (3)
10. St John’s (3)
11. St Mark’s (3)
12. Wellington (3)
13. West Heath (3)

=== Test Valley ===
Wards from 1 April 1974 (first election 7 June 1973) to 6 May 1976:

Wards from 6 May 1976 to 1 May 2003:

Wards from 1 May 2003 to 2 May 2019:

1. Abbey (2)
2. Alamein (3)
3. Ampfield & Braishfield (1)
4. Amport (1)
5. Anna (2)
6. Blackwater (2)
7. Bourne Valley (1)
8. Broughton & Stockbridge (2)
9. Charlton (1)
10. Chilworth, Nursling & Rownhams (3)
11. Cupernham (2)
12. Dun Valley (1)
13. Harewood (1)
14. Harroway (3)
15. Kings Somborne & Michelmersh (1)
16. Millway (3)
17. North Baddesley (3)
18. Over Wallop (1)
19. Penton Bellinger (2)
20. Romsey Extra (2)
21. St Mary's (3)
22. Tadburn (2)
23. Valley Park (3)
24. Winton (3)

Wards from 2 May 2019 to present:

1. Ampfield & Braishfield (1)
2. Andover Downlands (2)
3. Andover Harroway (3)
4. Andover Millway (3)
5. Andover Romans (3)
6. Andover St Mary's (3)
7. Andover Winton (2)
8. Anna (2)
9. Bellinger (1)
10. Blackwater (2)
11. Bourne Valley (1)
12. Charlton & the Pentons (1)
13. Chilworth, Nursling & Rownhams (3)
14. Harewood (1)
15. Mid Test (3)
16. North Baddesley (3)
17. Romsey Abbey (2)
18. Romsey Cupernham (3)
19. Romsey Tadburn (2)
20. Valley Park (2)

=== Winchester ===
Wards from 1 April 1974 (first election 7 June 1973) to 6 May 1976:

Wards from 6 May 1976 to 2 May 2002:

Wards from 2 May 2002 to 5 May 2016:

1. Bishops Waltham (3)
2. Boarhunt & Southwick (1)
3. Cheriton & Bishops Sutton (1)
4. Colden Common & Twyford (3)
5. Compton & Otterbourne (2)
6. Denmead (3)
7. Droxford, Soberton & Hambledon (1)
8. Itchen Valley (1)
9. Kings Worthy (2)
10. Littleton & Harestock (2)
11. Olivers Battery & Badger Farm (2)
12. Owslebury & Curdridge (2)
13. St Barnabas (3)
14. St Bartholomew (3)
15. St John & All Saints (3)
16. St Luke (3)
17. St Michael (3)
18. St Paul (3)
19. Shedfield (2)
20. Sparsholt (1)
21. Swanmore & Newtown (2)
22. The Alresfords (3)
23. Upper Meon Valley (1)
24. Whiteley (2)
25. Wickham (2)
26. Wonston & Micheldever (3)

Wards from 5 May 2016 to present:

1. Alresford & Itchen Valley (3)
2. Badger Farm & Oliver’s Battery (3)
3. Bishop’s Waltham (3)
4. Central Meon Valley (3)
5. Colden Common & Twyford (2)
6. Denmead (3)
7. St Barnabas (3)
8. St Bartholomew (3)
9. St Luke (2)
10. St Michael (3)
11. St Paul (3)
12. Southwick & Wickham (3)
13. The Worthys (3)
14. Upper Meon Valley (2)
15. Whiteley & Shedfield (3)
16. Wonston & Micheldever (3)

== Electoral wards by constituency ==
Wards as they existed on 1 December 2020.

=== Aldershot ===
Hart: Blackwater & Hawley; Yateley East.

Rushmoor: Aldershot Park; Cherrywood; Cove & Southwood; Empress; Fernhill; Knellwood; Manor Park; North Town; Rowhill; St John’s; St Mark’s; Wellington; West Heath.

=== Basingstoke ===
Basingstoke and Deane: Brighton Hill; Brookvale & Kings Furlong; Chineham; Eastrop & Grove; Hatch Warren & Beggarwood; Kempshott & Buckskin; Norden; Oakley & The Candovers (polling districts OC01, OC03, OC04, OC05, OC06, OC07, OC08, OC09 & OC11); Popley; South Ham; Winklebury & Manydown.

=== East Hampshire ===
Basingstoke and Deane: Oakley & The Candovers (polling districts OC02, OC10, OC12, OC13, OC14, OC15, OC16 & OC17).

East Hampshire: Alton Amery; Alton Ashdell; Alton Eastbrooke; Alton Holybourne; Alton Westbrooke; Alton Whitedown; Alton Wooteys; Bentworth & Froyle; Binsted, Bentley & Selborne; Buriton & East Meon; Clanfield; Four Marks & Medstead; Froxfield, Sheet & Steep; Horndean Catherington; Horndean Downs; Horndean Kings & Blendworth; Horndean Murray; Liss; Petersfield Bell Hill; Petersfield Causeway; Petersfield Heath; Petersfield St. Peter’s; Ropley, Hawkley & Hangers; Rowlands Castle.

=== Eastleigh ===
Eastleigh: Bishopstoke; Chandler’s Ford; Eastleigh Central; Eastleigh North; Eastleigh South; Fair Oak & Horton Heath; Hiltingbury; West End North; West End South.

Test Valley: Valley Park.

=== Fareham and Waterlooville ===
Fareham: Fareham East; Fareham North; Fareham North-West; Fareham South; Fareham West; Portchester East; Portchester West.

Havant: Cowplain; Hart Plain; Waterloo.

Winchester: Denmead; Southwick & Wickham.

=== Farnham and Bordon (part) ===
East Hampshire: Bramshott & Liphook; Grayshott; Headley; Lindford; Whitehill Chase; Whitehill Hogmoor & Greatham; Whitehill Pinewood.

=== Gosport ===
Fareham: Hill Head; Stubbington.

Gosport: Alverstoke; Anglesey; Bridgemary; Brockhurst & Privett; Elson; Forton; Grange & Alver Valley; Harbourside & Town; Hardway; Lee East; Lee West; Leesland & Newtown; Peel Common; Rowner & Holbrook.

=== Hamble Valley ===
Eastleigh: Botley; Bursledon & Hound North; Hamble & Netley; Hedge End North; Hedge End South.

Fareham: Locks Heath; Park Gate; Sarisbury; Titchfield; Titchfield Common; Warsash.

Winchester: Whiteley & Shedfield.

=== Havant ===
Havant: Barncroft; Battins; Bedhampton; Bondfields; Emsworth; Hayling East; Hayling West; Purbrook; St. Faith’s; Stakes; Warren Park.

=== New Forest East ===
New Forest: Ashurst, Copythorne South & Netley Marsh; Boldre & Sway; Bramshaw, Copythorne North & Minstead; Brockenhurst & Forest South East; Butts Ash & Dibden Purlieu; Dibden & Hythe East; Fawley, Blackfield & Langley; Furzedown & Hardley; Holbury & North Blackfield; Hythe West & Langdown; Lyndhurst; Marchwood; Totton Central; Totton East; Totton North; Totton South; Totton West.

=== New Forest West ===
New Forest: Barton; Bashley; Becton; Bransgore & Burley; Buckland; Downlands & Forest; Fernhill; Fordingbridge; Forest North West; Hordle; Lymington Town; Milford; Milton; Pennington; Ringwood East & Sopley; Ringwood North; Ringwood South.

=== North East Hampshire ===
Basingstoke and Deane: Basing & Upton Grey; Bramley.

Hart: Crookham East; Crookham West & Ewshot; Fleet Central; Fleet East; Fleet West; Hartley Wintney; Hook; Odiham; Yateley West.

=== North West Hampshire ===
Basingstoke and Deane: Evingar; Sherborne St. John & Rooksdown; Tadley & Pamber; Tadley North, Kingsclere & Baughurst; Whitchurch, Overton & Laverstoke.

Test Valley: Andover Downlands; Andover Harroway; Andover Millway; Andover Romans; Andover St. Mary’s; Andover Winton; Bourne Valley.

=== Portsmouth North ===
Portsmouth: Baffins; Copnor; Cosham; Drayton & Farlington; Hilsea; Nelson; Paulsgrove.

=== Portsmouth South ===
Portsmouth: Central Southsea; Charles Dickens; Eastney & Craneswater; Fratton; Milton; St. Jude; St. Thomas.

=== Romsey and Southampton North ===
Southampton: Bassett; Swaythling.

Test Valley: Ampfield & Braishfield; Anna; Bellinger; Blackwater; Charlton & the Pentons; Chilworth, Nursling & Rownhams; Harewood; Mid Test; North Baddesley; Romsey Abbey; Romsey Cupernham; Romsey Tadburn.

=== Southampton Itchen ===
Southampton: Bargate; Bitterne; Bitterne Park; Harefield; Peartree; Sholing; Woolston.

=== Southampton Test ===
Southampton: Bevois; Coxford; Freemantle; Millbrook; Portswood; Redbridge; Shirley.

=== Winchester ===
Winchester: Alresford & Itchen Valley; Badger Farm & Oliver’s Battery; Bishop’s Waltham; Central Meon Valley; Colden Common & Twyford; St. Barnabas; St. Bartholomew; St. Luke; St. Michael; St. Paul; The Worthys; Upper Meon Valley; Wonston & Micheldever.

== See also ==
- List of parliamentary constituencies in Hampshire
