= Ralph Beaumont =

The Honourable Ralph Beaumont CBE, TD, DL, JP
- Beaumont in 1942

Member of Parliament for Portsmouth Central
- In office 27 October 1931 – 5 July 1945
- Preceded by: Glenvil Hall
- Succeeded by: Julian Snow

Personal details
- Born: Ralph Edward Blackett Beaumont; 12 February 1901 Belgravia, London, UK
- Died: 18 September 1977 (aged 76)
- Party: Conservative
- Spouse: Helena Wray
- Children: John Ralph Beaumont
- Parent(s): Wentworth Beaumont and Alexandrina Vane-Tempest
- Education: Eton College and Christ Church, Oxford

Military service
- Branch/service: British Army
- Years of service: –1956
- Rank: Lieutenant colonel
- Awards: Territorial Decoration

Ralph Edward Blackett Beaumont CBE, TD, DL, JP (12 February 1901 – 18 September 1977), styled The Honourable from 1907, was a British soldier and Conservative Party politician.

== Background and education ==
Born at Belgrave Square in London, he was the second son of Wentworth Beaumont, 1st Viscount Allendale and his wife Lady Alexandrina Louise Maud Vane-Tempest, daughter of George Vane-Tempest, 5th Marquess of Londonderry. His older brother was Wentworth Beaumont, 2nd Viscount Allendale. Beaumont was educated at Eton College and went then to Christ Church, Oxford, where he graduated with a Bachelor of Arts in 1923 and with a Master of Arts in 1953.

== Military career ==
He joined the British Army and was promoted to a second lieutenant of the Royal Welch Fusiliers in 1931. Beaumont became lieutenant in 1934 and captain with the begin of the Second World War in 1939. He was finally advanced to lieutenant-colonel in 1947.

Beaumont received the Territorial Decoration in 1948 and an additional clasp two years later. Having reached the age limit in 1956, he left the Army.

== Political career ==
He stood unsuccessfully for Cannock in 1929. Beaumont entered the British House of Commons in 1931, sitting as a Member of Parliament (MP) for Portsmouth Central until the war's end in 1945. During this time he was appointed Parliamentary Private Secretary to the Postmaster-General in 1935, a post he held until 1940, and to the Secretary of State for War in 1942 until his defeat in the general election three years later.

== Post political career ==
From 1952, he worked as a Development Commissioner.

Beaumont was nominated High Sheriff of Montgomeryshire in 1957, representing the county also as justice of the peace. He was chairman of the Montgomeryshire County Agriculture Executive Committee and served as a member of the Council on Tribunals from 1958. Having been previously a deputy lieutenant, he became Vice Lord Lieutenant of Montgomeryshire in 1962 until his death in 1977. Beaumont was awarded a Commander of the Order of the British Empire in the New Year's Honours 1967.

== Personal life ==
On 22 March 1926, he married Helena Mary Christine Wray, younger daughter of Brigadier Cecil Wray, at St George's, Hanover Square, and had by her three children. Beaumont's wife died in 1962 and he survived her until 1977; he was buried at St Peter's Church, Machynlleth. His older son was the Rhodesian politician John Ralph Beaumont.

Parliament of the United Kingdom
Preceded by Glenvil Hall	Member of Parliament for Portsmouth Central; 1931 – 1945	Succeeded by Julian Snow
