= 1892 Grand National =

English steeplechase horse race

- Grand National
- Location: Aintree
- Date: 20 March 1892
- Winning horse: Father O'Flynn
- Starting price: 20/1
- Jockey: Capt. Roddy Owen
- Trainer: Gordon Wilson
- Owner: Gordon Wilson
- Conditions: Good

The 1892 Grand National was the 54th renewal of the Grand National horse race that took place at Aintree near Liverpool, England, on 20 March 1892.

== Finishing Order ==
Position	Name	Jockey	Age	Handicap (st-lb)	SP	Distance
01	Father O'Flynn	Capt Roddy Owen	7	10-5	20/1	20 Lengths
02	Closter	John Cotrell-Dormer	?	12-3	11/2	
03	Ilex	Arthur Nightingall	?	12-7	20/1	
04	Ardcarn	Terry Kavanagh	?	10-10	10/1	
05	Flying Column	Mr William Beasley	?	10-7	50/1	
06	Hollington	George Williamson	?	10-9	100/9	
07	Cruiser	Mr WP Cullen	?	10-7	25/1	
08	Reliance	Mr JC Cheney	?	10-8	200/1	
09	Ulysses	Mr GB Milne	?	10-10	50/1	
10	Faust	Mr Tommy Lushington	?	10-5	100/1	
11	Bagman	Mr Fred Hassall	?	10-7	200/1	Last to complete

== Non-finishers ==
Fence	Name	Jockey	Age	Handicap (st-lb)	SP	Fate
26	The Midshipmite	Mr Frank Atkinson	?	11-6	25/1	Fell
18	Tenby	C Gregor	?	11-2	100/7	Fell
03	Partisan	Arthur Barker	?	11-1	40/1	Knocked Over
?	Lord of the Glen	Mr Chris Waller	?	11-0	33/1	?
18	The Primate	Capt Percy Bewicke	?	10-13	100/14	Pulled Up
22	Meldrum	Lathorn	?	10-12	100/1	Fell
22	Jason	George Mawson	?	10-12	100/8	Pulled Up
24	Paul Pry	Tom Adams	?	10-12	200/1	Ran Out
?	Lord Arthur	Capt SF Lee-Barber	?	10-7	25/1	?
24	Nap	Mr Herbert Woodland	?	10-7	200/1	Fell
?	Southam	Bill Dollery	?	10-7	50/1	?
22	Rollesby	H Brown	?	10-5	50/1	Pulled Up
17	Billee Taylor	Mr Harry Beasley snr	?	10-3	25/1	Ran Out
?	Brunswick	Mr Levenston	?	10-2	100/1	?
