= Walter Clough =

Walter Clough

Walter Owen Clough (15 September 1846 – 17 April 1922) was a British Liberal Party politician.

Clough was born in Huddersfield, Yorkshire on 15 September 1846.

He was elected at the 1892 general election as a Member of Parliament for Portsmouth. Portsmouth's two MPs (one Liberal Unionist and one Conservative) had not stood for re-election, and Clough was one of the two Liberals elected to replace them.

He was re-elected in 1895, but did not serve a full term, and decided to resign his seat due to a judgment against him in the Law Courts. This was formalised on 23 April 1900 by the technical device of accepting appointment as Steward of the Manor of Northstead, a notional "office of profit under The Crown". The by-election for his seat was held on 3 May 1900, and won by the Liberal candidate Thomas Bramsdon.

In the 1901 Census of London Clough is listed as a 54-year-old Chartered Accountant & Auditor, Magistrate and D L of the City of London living at Manor House, Upper Richmond Road, Barnes, Surrey with his wife Hannah and two sons.

Clough died in the Kingston Registration district on 17 April 1922 aged 75.

Parliament of the United Kingdom
Preceded by Sir Samuel Wilson; Sir William Crossman	Member of Parliament for Portsmouth; 1892 – May 1900; With: Sir John Baker	Succeeded by Sir John Baker; Thomas Bramsdon
