= 1900 Portsmouth by-election =

UK parliamentary by-election

The 1900 Portsmouth by-election was a parliamentary by-election held on 3 May 1900 for one of the two seats in the British House of Commons constituency of Portsmouth in Hampshire.

== Vacancy ==
The seat had become vacant when the Liberal Member of Parliament (MP) Walter Clough had decided to resign his seat due to a judgment against him in the Law Courts. This was formalised on 23 April 1900 by the technical device of accepting appointment as Steward of the Manor of Northstead, a notional "office of profit under The Crown". The writ for the by-election was moved in the Commons three days later, on 26 April.

== Previous result ==
Walter Clough

General election 1895: Portsmouth (2 seats) Electorate 24,057
Party	Candidate	Votes	%	±%
Liberal	Sir John Baker	10,451	26.1	+0.3
Liberal	Walter Owen Clough	10,255	25.6	+0.2
Conservative	Alfred Charles William Harmsworth	9,717	24.3	−0.2
Liberal Unionist	Rt Hon. Anthony Evelyn Melbourne Ashley	9,567	23.9	−0.3
Majority		538	1.3	+0.4
Turnout		39,990 (20,129 voted)	83.7	+3.1
Liberal hold		Swing	+0.3	
Liberal hold		Swing	+0.3	

== Candidates ==
The Liberal Party selected Thomas Bramsdon, a 43-year-old solicitor and a native of Portsmouth. The Conservative Party selected 29-year-old James Majendie.

== Result ==
The result was a narrow victory for Bramsdon.

T.A. Bramsdon

Portsmouth by-election, 3 May 1900 Electorate 26,698
Party	Candidate	Votes	%	±%
Liberal	Thomas Arthur Bramsdon	10,287	51.4	−24.3
Conservative	James Henry Alexander Majendie	9,708	48.6	+24.3
Majority		579	2.8	+1.5
Turnout		19,995	74.9	−8.8
Liberal hold		Swing		

However, he held the seat only briefly; at the general election in October 1900, he lost his seat to Majendie.

== See also ==
- Portsmouth constituency
- 1916 Portsmouth by-election
- Portsmouth
- List of United Kingdom by-elections
- United Kingdom by-election records
