= John Ralph Beaumont =

Rhodesian politician (1927–1992)

John Ralph Beaumont DL, JP (22 April 1927 – November 1992) was a Rhodesian politician. He was the son of Ralph Edward Blackett Beaumont, son of Wentworth Beaumont, 1st Viscount Allendale, and his wife Helena Mary Christine Wray, daughter of Cecil Wray.

== Education ==
He was educated at Eton College and then Christ Church, Oxford, where he graduated with a Master of Arts in 1952.

== Career ==
In the 1962 Federation of Rhodesia and Nyasaland election, Beaumont was elected for Mrewa, sitting for the constituency until the federation's dissolution in the following year.

He became a Justice of the Peace of Powys in 1976 and represented the county as Deputy Lieutenant from 1983.

== Residence ==
In his later years he lived in the family home at Plas Llwyngwern, near Machynlleth.

== Family ==
On 26 June 1951, he married Audrey Lilian Christie Hickling, daughter of Edward Thomas Hickling, and had by her six children, five sons and one daughter.:

- Ralph Wentworth Christopher Beaumont b. 4 Apr 1952
- Nigel Canning Vane Beaumont b. 9 Jan 1954
- Andrew John Blackett Beaumont b. 27 Mar 1956
- Louise Christine Winsmore Beaumont b. 27 Mar 1956
- Hugh Edward Stewart Beaumont b. 31 Mar 1959
- Peter John Tempest Beaumont b. 29 Dec 1964

== Death ==
Beaumont died, aged 65 in Wales.
