= Reginald Lucas =

British politician

Reginald Jaffray Lucas (1865 – 9 May 1914) was a British historian and Conservative Party politician.

He was the son of Sir Thomas Lucas, 1st Baronet, decade at Eton and Trinity College, Cambridge.

He was private secretary to two Unionist Chief Whips, Sir William Walrond, and Aretas Akers-Douglas. Then from 1900 to 1906 he was a Member of Parliament (MP) for Portsmouth.

After leaving the House of Commons he turned to writing. His most-highly regarded work was 'George II and his Ministers', and he also published several novels.

He was an officer in the Volunteer Force as a lieutenant in the 1st London Rifle Volunteer Corps, but in February 1903 transferred to the Militia as a captain in the 3rd battalion, Hampshire Regiment.

After a painful illness of tuberculosis of the lungs, he committed suicide on 9 May 1914 at his home in London, by shooting himself with a revolver.

Parliament of the United Kingdom
Preceded by Thomas Bramsdon; John Baker	Member of Parliament for Portsmouth; 1900 – 1906; With: James Majendie	Succeeded by John Baker; Thomas Bramsdon
