= Frank Privett =

British politician (1874–1937)

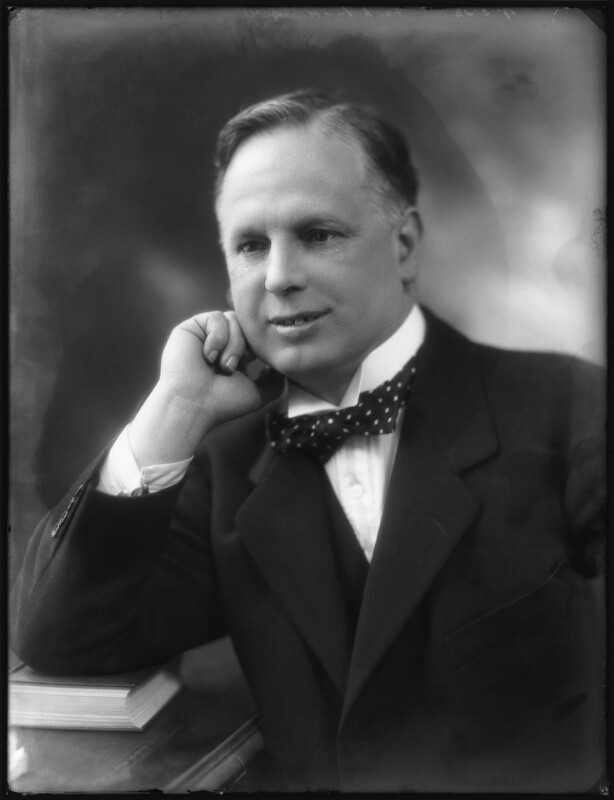
- Privett in 1923

Member of Parliament for Portsmouth Central
- In office 15 November 1922 – 6 December 1923
- Preceded by: Thomas Bramsdon
- Succeeded by: Thomas Bramsdon

Personal details
- Born: Frank John Privett; 28 December 1874
- Died: 29 March 1937 (aged 62)
- Party: Conservative
- Other political affiliations: Independent Conservative

Frank John Privett (28 December 1874 – 29 March 1937) was a British Conservative Party politician who served briefly as a Member of Parliament (MP) in the early 1920s.

== Political career ==
He was first elected to the House of Commons at the general election in November 1922 for the Central division of Portsmouth. His victory, by a majority of only 7 votes, came after a closely fought four-way contest between Labour, Conservative, Liberal and National Liberal candidates, all of whom won over 21% of the votes.

The following year, at the general election in December 1923, the rift in the Liberal Party had been healed, and Privett lost the seat to Sir Thomas Bramsdon, the Liberal who he had beaten the previous year. After his defeat, Privett stood for Parliament on only one further occasion, when he was unsuccessful as an "Independent Conservative" candidate in the Southern division of Portsmouth at the 1929 general election.

Parliament of the United Kingdom
Preceded by Sir Thomas Bramsdon	Member of Parliament for Portsmouth Central; 1922–1923	Succeeded by Sir Thomas Bramsdon
