= Philip Vanderbyl =

Philip Vanderbyl (28 April 1827 – 16 May 1892) was a qualified doctor, merchant and a Liberal politician.

== Biography ==
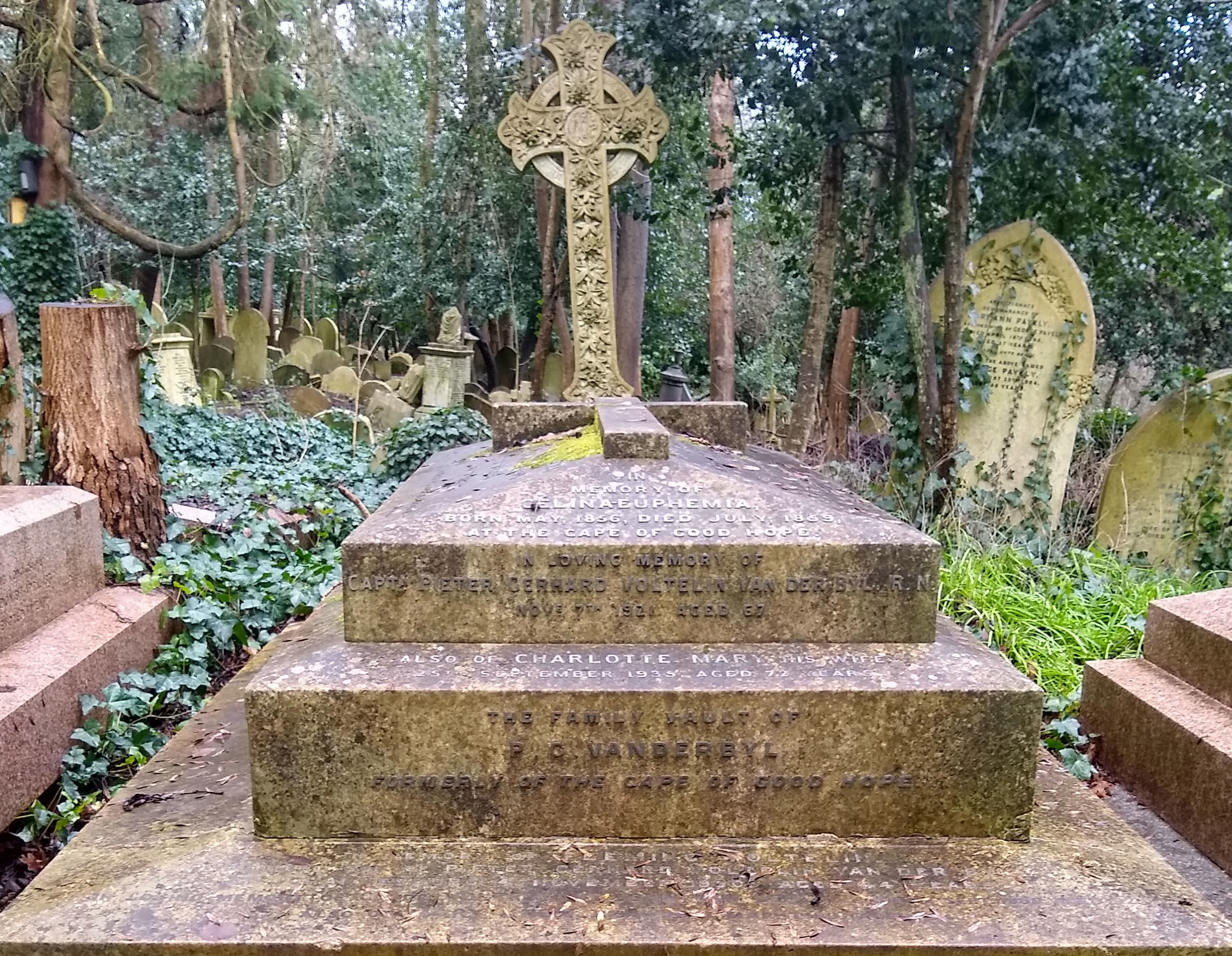
Vanderbyl family vault in Highgate Cemetery (west)

Vanderbyl was the son of P. V. Vanderbyl of the Cape of Good Hope. He trained as a doctor at the University of Edinburgh obtaining M.D. in honours and a gold medal. He became M.R.C.S. Eng. in 1849 and M.R.C.P. Lond. in 1855. He retired from medical practice 1858 and went into business. He was a member of the firm of Redfern Alexander and Company who were the London merchant house for many important Australian and New Zealand businesses. He was also on the board of directors of the Metropolitan Trading Association Limited which chartered cargo ships to carry meat, especially frozen beef, between London and the United States. He also dealt in iron and was a director of the East and West India Dock Company. He became one of the most wealthy and influential merchants in London.

Vanderbyl stood unsuccessfully for Parliament at Great Yarmouth in 1865. In 1866 he was elected at a by-election as Member of Parliament (MP) for Bridgewater and was re-elected in 1868. However he and his colleague were unseated in 1869 and the town was disfranchised for bribery and corruption. In 1872 he bought an estate at Northwood Park near Winchester and by 1884 had a much larger house built there. At the 1885 general election Vanderbyl was elected MP for Portsmouth. However he was defeated in 1886, and was unsuccessful when he stood at by-election in January 1888 for Winchester.

Vanderbyl died at the age of 64. His son was the cricketer, traveller, hunter and soldier Philip Vanderbyl.

Vanderbyl married Sara Alexander in 1853.

Parliament of the United Kingdom
| Preceded by George Patton; Alexander William Kinglake | Member of Parliament for Bridgwater; 1866–1869; With: Alexander William Kinglake | Constituency disenfranchised |
| Preceded by Thomas Charles Bruce sir Henry Drummond Wolff | Member of Parliament for Portsmouth; 1885–1886; With: Sir William Crossman | Succeeded by Samuel Wilson; Sir William Crossman |
