= Portsmouth Central =

Former parliamentary constituency in the United Kingdom

- Former borough constituency for the House of Commons
- Boundary of Portsmouth Central in Hampshire for the 1945 general election
- County: Hampshire
- Major settlements: Portsmouth

1918–1950
- Seats: One
- Created from: Portsmouth
- Replaced by: Portsmouth South and Portsmouth West

Portsmouth Central was a borough constituency in Portsmouth. It returned one member of parliament (MP) to the House of Commons of the Parliament of the United Kingdom, elected by the first past the post system.

== History ==
The constituency was created for the 1918 general election, when the Representation of the People Act 1918 divided the two-member Portsmouth constituency into three new constituencies; North, South and Central.

It was abolished for the 1950 general election, with Buckland, Fratton and St Mary wards forming part of the new Portsmouth West seat, while the others were transferred to Portsmouth South.

== Boundaries and boundary changes ==
Dates	Local authority	Maps	Wards
1918–1950	County Borough of Portsmouth		Buckland, Fratton, Kingston, St Mary, and Town Hall.

=== 1918–1950 ===
The constituency was formed from splitting the existing of constituency Portsmouth

== Members of parliament ==
Election	Member	Party	Notes
1918	Sir Thomas Bramsdon	Liberal	Member for Portsmouth (1900, 1906–1910)
1922	Frank Privett	Conservative	
1923	Sir Thomas Bramsdon	Liberal	
1924	Harry Foster	Conservative	
1929	Glenvil Hall	Labour	
1931	Ralph Beaumont	Conservative	
1945	Julian Snow	Labour	Contested Lichfield and Tamworth following redistribution
1950	constituency abolished: see Portsmouth South and Portsmouth West		

=== Elections in the 1910s ===
General election 1918: Portsmouth Central
Party		Candidate	Votes	%
	Liberal	Thomas Bramsdon	10,929	52.2
C	Unionist	William Dupree	6,008	28.7
	Labour	Hugh Hinshelwood	4,004	19.1
Majority			4,921	23.5
Turnout			20,941	58.2
Registered electors			35,964	
	Liberal win (new seat)			
C indicates candidate endorsed by the coalition government.

=== Elections in the 1920s ===
General election 1922: Portsmouth Central
Party	Candidate	Votes	%	±%
Unionist	Frank Privett	7,666	26.8	–1.9
National Liberal	Thomas Fisher	7,659	26.8	New
Liberal	Thomas Bramsdon	7,129	24.9	–27.2
Labour	Arthur Gourd	6,126	21.4	+2.3
Majority		7	0.0	N/A
Turnout		28,580	77.9	+19.7
Registered electors		36,695		
Unionist gain from Liberal		Swing	+12.7	

General election 1923: Portsmouth Central
Party	Candidate	Votes	%	±%
Liberal	Thomas Bramsdon	11,493	38.7	+13.7
Unionist	Frank Privett	10,231	34.4	+7.6
Labour	Frank Crozier	7,991	26.9	+5.5
Majority		1,262	4.2	N/A
Turnout		29,715	78.2	+0.3
Registered electors		37,991		
Liberal gain from Unionist		Swing	+3.1	

General election 1924: Portsmouth Central
Party	Candidate	Votes	%	±%
Unionist	Harry Foster	14,028	46.0	+11.6
Labour	Glenvil Hall	10,525	34.5	+7.6
Liberal	Frank Gray	5,926	19.4	–19.2
Majority		3,503	11.5	N/A
Turnout		30,479	80.3	+2.1
Registered electors		37,966		
Unionist gain from Liberal		Swing	+15.4	

General election 1929: Portsmouth Central
Party	Candidate	Votes	%	±%
Labour	Glenvil Hall	15,153	42.4	+7.8
Unionist	Thomas Comyn-Platt	13,628	38.1	–7.9
Liberal	Charles Cohen	6,993	19.5	+0.1
Majority		1,525	4.3	N/A
Turnout		35,774	74.3	–6.0
Registered electors		48,146		
Labour gain from Unionist		Swing	+7.9	

=== Elections in the 1930s ===
General election 1931: Portsmouth Central
Party	Candidate	Votes	%	±%
Conservative	Ralph Beaumont	24,623	62.9	+24.8
Labour	Glenvil Hall	14,512	37.1	–5.3
Majority		10,111	25.8	N/A
Turnout		39,135	78.4	+4.1
Registered electors		49,927		
Conservative gain from Labour		Swing	+15.1	

General election 1935: Portsmouth Central
Party	Candidate	Votes	%	±%
Conservative	Ralph Beaumont	21,578	60.1	–2.9
Labour	David Freeman	10,733	29.9	–7.2
Liberal	Ernest Thornley	3,612	10.1	New
Majority		10,845	30.2	+4.4
Turnout		35,923	71.1	–7.3
Registered electors		50,558		
Conservative hold		Swing	+2.2	

=== Elections in the 1940s ===
General Election 1939–40:

Another General Election was required to take place before the end of 1940. The political parties had been making preparations for an election to take place from 1939 and by the end of this year, the following candidates had been selected;

- Conservative: Ralph Beaumont
- Labour: Peter R Pain

General election 1945: Portsmouth Central
Party	Candidate	Votes	%	±%
Labour	Julian Snow	14,745	55.3	+25.4
Conservative	Ralph Beaumont	11,345	42.6	–17.5
Democratic	Walter Foster	561	2.1	New
Majority		3,400	12.8	N/A
Turnout		26,651	73.5	+2.5
Registered electors		36,255		
Labour gain from Conservative		Swing	+21.5	
