= Philip Vanderbyl (cricketer) =

English cricketer, traveller, hunter and soldier

Personal information
- Full name: Philip Breda Vanderbyl
- Born: 11 November 1867; Kensington, Middlesex, England
- Died: 20 March 1930 (aged 62); Cairo, Kingdom of Egypt
- Batting: Unknown

Domestic team information
- Years: Team
- 1900: Marylebone Cricket Club

Career statistics
Competition	First-class
Matches	1
Runs scored	38
Batting average	38.00
100s/50s	–/–
Top score	38
Catches/stumpings	–/–
- Source: Cricinfo, 20 June 2021

Philip Breda Vanderbyl (11 November 1867 – 20 March 1930) was an English first-class cricketer, traveller, hunter and soldier.

The son of the politician Philip Vanderbyl, he was born at Kensington in November 1867. He later studied at Pembroke College, Cambridge. He was a member of the Marylebone Cricket Club (MCC) and played one first-class match for the club against Worcestershire at Lord's in 1900. Vanderbyl batted once in the match, scoring 38 runs before he was dismissed by R. E. Foster in the MCC first innings. Soon after this match he served in South Africa in the Second Boer War. Vanderbyl was a keen traveller and took part in big-game hunts during his travels. He was elected a fellow of the Zoological Society of London in 1906. Vanderbyl later served in the First World War with the Royal Garrison Artillery, being commissioned as a second lieutenant in November 1914. He transferred to the Warwick Royal Horse Artillery in June 1915, being granted the temporary rank of captain; by June 1916, he had been promoted to the full rank. Vanderbyl died in Egypt at Cairo in March 1930.
