= 1916 Portsmouth by-election =

UK parliamentary by-election

The 1916 Portsmouth by-election was a parliamentary by-election held for the British House of Commons constituency of Portsmouth on 15 January 1916. The seat had become vacant when Lord Charles Beresford (one of the constituency's two Conservative Members of Parliament) was elevated to peerage as Baron Beresford.

The Conservative candidate, Hon. Sir Hedworth Meux, was returned unopposed. He held the seat until the constituency was divided at the 1918 general election, and did not stand for Parliament again.

== Sources ==
- Craig, F. W. S. (1989) [1974]. British parliamentary election results 1885–1918 (2nd ed.). Chichester: Parliamentary Research Services. p. 172. ISBN 0-900178-27-2.

== See also ==
- Portsmouth (UK Parliament constituency)
- 1900 Portsmouth by-election
- The town (now city) of Portsmouth
- List of United Kingdom by-elections (1900–1918)
