= Samuel Wilson (Portsmouth MP) =

Anglo-Australian pastoralist and politician

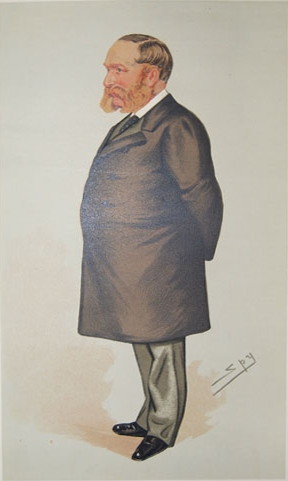
"a squatter" Wilson as caricatured by Spy (Leslie Ward) in Vanity Fair, January 1885

Sir Samuel Wilson (7 February 1832 – 11 June 1895) was an Irish-born Australian pastoralist and politician, and later a British Member of Parliament.

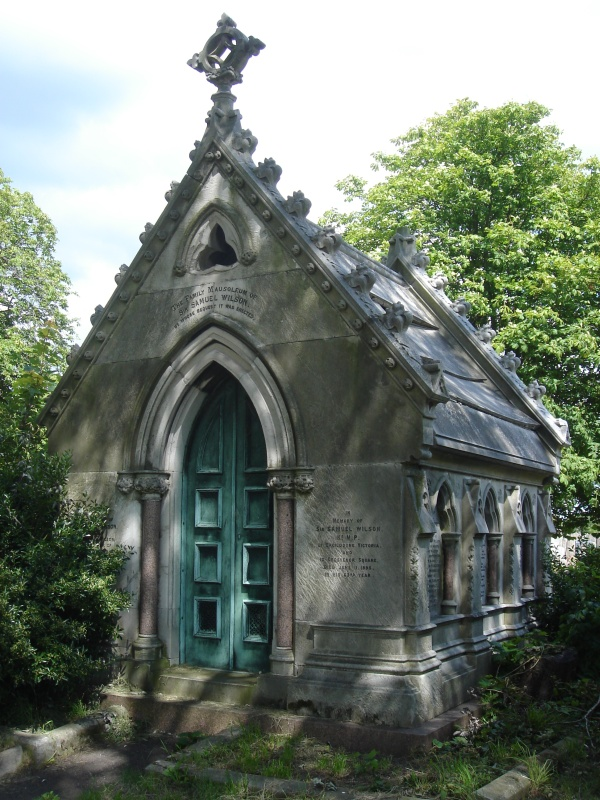
Funerary monument, Kensal Green Cemetery, London

Wilson was born in Ballycloughan, County Antrim, Ireland, in 1832.

== Australian entrepreneur ==
Coursing was his preferred sport and he was President of the Ballarat Coursing Club from at least 1875 to 1882. He awarded £20 for the winner of the 1875 Ercildoune Cup and in 1876 it was run on his 11,000-hectare (26,000-acre) Ercildoun (Note: Ercildoun was originally spelt without the added ‘e’. Wilson added on the ‘e’ as he wanted an even number of letters on the entrance gates. For the purposes of this article, the original spelling is adopted. Variances exist in the spelling of the homestead's name between various sources, and sometimes, within the source itself.) estate.

Purchased in 1873 for a rumoured A£250,000, Wilson's achievements at Ercildoun included extensive additions to the homestead, the development of the garden to include the long entry avenue of alternating Himalayan cedar and Monterey pines, a walled garden, and the establishment of a deer park. He was also involved in the development of one of the first trout hatcheries in Colonial Victoria, and the continued production of fine merino wool.

He was elected a member of the Victorian Legislative Council (1875-1881) and Legislative Assembly (1861-64) for the Western Province. He was knighted in 1875.

He died on 11 June 1895, and is buried in Kensal Green Cemetery, London. Lady Wilson stayed on at Grosvenor Square until 1907.

== Marriage and issue ==
In 1861 he married a daughter of the Hon William Campbell. William Campbell is credited with being the first person to find gold in Clunes in 1850 and so spark the Victoria gold rush. They had four sons and five daughters: all four sons and two of the daughters survived him.

His eldest son, Lieutenant-Colonel Gordon Chesney Wilson, married Lady Sarah Isabella Churchill, sister of Lord Randolph Churchill, he fell in The First World War on 6 November 1914 and is buried at Zillebeke Churchyard, West Flanders, Belgium.

Another son Wilfred Wilson was mortally wounded in an attack on Boer positions at Hartebeestfontein during the Second Boer War.

His daughter Maud Margaret Wilson married Warner Hastings, 15th Earl of Huntingdon in 1892.

His son Clarence lived at Grove Place, Nursling, Southampton, Hampshire

== Notes ==
Parliament of the United Kingdom
Preceded by Philip Vanderbyl; Sir William Crossman	Member of Parliament for Portsmouth; 1886–1892; With: Sir William Crossman	Succeeded by Sir John Baker; Walter Clough
