= John Baker (Portsmouth MP) =

British Liberal politician (1828–1909)

Sir John Baker

Sir John Baker JP (1828 – 9 November 1909) was a Liberal Party politician in the United Kingdom.

He was elected at the 1892 general election as one of the two Members of Parliament (MPs) for Portsmouth, and held the seat until his defeat at the 1900 general election, when both Portsmouth seats were won by the Conservative Party.

He was re-elected at the 1906 general election, but died in office in 1909, aged 81. No by-election was held for his seat before Parliament was dissolved for the January 1910 general election.

Parliament of the United Kingdom
Preceded by William Crossman and Samuel Wilson	Member of Parliament for Portsmouth; 1892 – 1900; With: Walter Clough 1892–1900; Thomas Bramsdon, 1900	Succeeded by James Majendie and Reginald Lucas
Preceded by James Majendie and Reginald Lucas	Member of Parliament for Portsmouth; 1906 – 1909; With: Thomas Bramsdon	Succeeded by Bertram Falle and Lord Charles Beresford
