= Brian Roberts (historian) =

Brian Roberts (born 1930, London) authored numerous historical and biographical works around prominent persons, places and themes shaping South African history.

Educated at St Mary's College, Twickenham, and at the University of London, he qualified as a sociologist and a teacher. It was as a teacher that he went to South Africa in 1959. He and his partner, biographer and historian Theo Aronson, became disenchanted with the political regime in South Africa in the late 1970s and moved to England in 1979.

== Books ==
Roberts' books include:

- Ladies in the Veld (1965) about Lady Florence Dixie and Theresa Yelverton
- Cecil Rhodes and the Princess (1969) Rhodes and his association with Princess Catherine Radziwill
- Churchills in Africa (1970) about Lord Randolph Churchill, his sister Lady Sarah Wilson and the young Winston Churchill
- The Diamond Magnates (1972) about Cecil Rhodes, Barney Barnato, Alfred Beit etc.
- The Zulu Kings (1974)
- Kimberley, Turbulent City (1976)
- The Mad Bad Line: The Family of Lord Alfred Douglas (1981)
- Randolph: A Study of Churchill's Son (1984)
- Cecil Rhodes: Flawed Colossus (1987)
- Those Bloody Women: Three Heroines of the Boer War (1991) about Lady Sarah Wilson, Johanna Brandt and Emily Hobhouse
