= John Fryer =

John Fryer may refer to:

- John Fryer (physician, died 1563), English physician, humanist and early reformer
- John Fryer (physician, died 1672), English physician
- John Fryer (travel writer) (1650–1733), British travel-writer and doctor
- Sir John Fryer, 1st Baronet (1671–1726), Lord Mayor of London
- John Fryer (Royal Navy officer) (1753–1817), sailing master on HMS Bounty
- Sir John Fryer (British Army officer) (1838–1917), British Army general
- John Fryer (sinologist) (1839–1928), educator, translator, scientist
- Sir John Fryer (entomologist) (1886–1948), English entomologist
- John Denis Fryer (1895–1923), Australian soldier and university student
- John E. Fryer (1938–2003), psychiatrist and gay rights activist
- John Fryer (producer) (born 1958), rock producer

== See also ==
- Jack Fryer (disambiguation)
- John Fryer Thomas Keane (1854–1937), traveller
