= Richard Abraham =

Richard Abraham may refer to:

- Richard Abraham (14th-century politician), English politician, MP for Portsmouth in 1372, 1377, and 1383
- Richard Abraham (15th-century politician), English politician, MP for Portsmouth in 1437
