= Stephen Gaselee =

Stephen Gaselee may refer to:

- Stephen Gaselee (judge) (1762–1839), British judge, justice of the Court of Common Pleas
- Stephen Gaselee (serjeant-at-law) (1807–1883), MP for Portsmouth 1865–1868
- Stephen Gaselee (diplomat) (1882–1943), British diplomat, writer and librarian
