= Portsmouth (UK Parliament constituency) =

Former parliamentary constituency in the United Kingdom

- Former borough constituency for the House of Commons
- County: Hampshire
- Major settlements: Portsmouth

1295–1918
- Seats: Two
- Replaced by: Portsmouth North, Portsmouth South and Portsmouth Central

Portsmouth was a borough constituency based upon the borough of Portsmouth in Hampshire. It returned two members of parliament (MPs) to the Parliaments of England, Great Britain and from 1801 the House of Commons of the Parliament of the United Kingdom, elected by the bloc vote system.

== History ==
The constituency first elected MPs in 1295. It was abolished at the 1918 general election, when the Representation of the People Act 1918 divided it into three new constituencies; Portsmouth North, Portsmouth South and Portsmouth Central.

According to Namier and Brooke in The House of Commons 1754–1790, the right of election was in the freemen of the borough who numbered about 100. The town was known as an Admiralty borough and at least one MP was usually an Admiral.

The Earl of Sandwich was First Lord of the Admiralty from 1771 to 1782. He imposed tighter Admiralty control over the borough. This change of policy led to an independent element of the local Council supporting challengers to the Admiralty candidates between 1774 and 1780.

When party politics re-emerged in the late 18th and early 19th centuries, Portsmouth was a predominantly Whig constituency. It only once elected a Tory Member of Parliament between 1790 and 1832.

The Reform Act 1832 considerably expanded the electorate of the borough. The freemen retained their ancient right franchise, but were outnumbered by the new occupier voters amongst the 1,295 electors registered in 1832. As a result of the expanded electorate the borough became more competitive. Contested elections became the norm rather than the exception, as they had been before the Reform Act.

Candidates with naval connections continued to be frequent in Portsmouth, after the Reform Act. The borough developed into a marginal constituency, particularly in the last half century of its existence.

== Boundaries ==
The parliamentary borough of Portsmouth was (as the area remains in the 21st century) a major seaport and naval base on the south coast of England. It is situated in the county of Hampshire.

From the 1885 general election until the dissolution before the 1918 election the constituency was surrounded (on the landward side) by the Fareham seat.

== Members of Parliament ==
=== 1295–1640 ===
Parliament	First member	Second member
1357	John Pounde	
1372	Richard Abraham	?
January 1377	Richard Abraham	?
February 1383	Richard Abraham	?
1386	William Bristowe	Richard Mautravers
1388 (Feb)	John atte Mede	?
1388 (Sep)	Richard Gay	William Bristowe
1390 (Jan)	Richard Robust	William atte Pury
1390 (Nov)		
1391	William atte Pury	Henry Seys
1393	William atte Pury	Richard Whiliare
1394	William Hicche I	Henry Seys
1395	Richard Gay	Stephen Agulon
1397 (Jan)	William Hicche II	Henry Seys
1397 (Sep)	William Hicche II	Henry Seys
1399	William atte Pury	William Balchief
1401		
1402	Richard Spicer alias Newport	William Hicche II
1404 (Jan)		
1404 (Oct)		
1406	William atte Pury	Richard Gay
1407		
1410	Henry Abraham	
1411	William Balchief	William atte Pury
1413 (Feb)		
1413 (May)	William atte Pury	William Balchief
1414 (Apr)		
1414 (Nov)	William Balchief	William atte Pury
1415	William atte Pury	Henry Abraham
1416 (Mar)	William atte Pury	Thomas Robust
1416 (Oct)		
1417	William atte Pury	Richard Gay
1419	William Balchief	John Serle
1420	William Balchief	John Versy
1421 (May)	Simon Stubbere	Henry Abraham
1421 (Dec)	William Balchief	Richard Hert
1422	Henry Abraham	
1433	Robert Abraham	Unknown
1437	Richard Abraham	Unknown
1467	Henry Uvedale	Unknown
1449-1450	Robert Abraham	Unknown
1510–1523	No names known	
1529	Geoffrey Lee	Francis Dignely
1536	?	
1539	?John Chaderton	?
1542	Christopher Staverton	?John Chaderton
1545	John Fryer	Michael Gore
1547	Robert Blount	Henry Knollys
1553 (Mar)	Sir Richard Wingfield	John Chaderton
1553 (Oct)	John Chaderton	Henry Bickley
1554 (Apr)	Richard Sackville	William Cooke
1554 (Nov)	Edmund Cockerell	John de Vic
1555	Ralph Henslowe	Edmund Cockerell
1558	Edward Cordell	Edmund Cockerell
1559	William Wynter	George Brooke alias Cobham
1563	William Wynter	Thomas Smythe
1571	Lawrence Blundestone	Henry Slater
1572	Sir Henry Radclyffe	Robert Colshill
1584	Thomas Bodley	Thomas Radcliffe
1586	Thomas Harris	Thomas Thorney
1588	Thomas Harris	Thomas Thorney
1593	Edward Radclyffe	Thomas Thorney
1597	William Greene	Thomas Thorney
1601	John Moore	Edward Jones
1604	Sir Oliver St John	Sir Richard Jenvoy
1614	John Griffith	George Thorpe
1621–1622	Sir Daniel Norton	Sir Benjamin Rudyerd
1624	Sir William Uvedale	Sir Benjamin Rudyerd
1625	Sir Benjamin Rudyerd	Sir Daniel Norton
1626	Sir James Fullerton	Thomas Whatman
1628	Owen Jennens	William Towerson
1629–1640	No Parliaments summoned	

=== 1640–1918 ===
Year	First member	First party	Second member	Second party
April 1640	The Earl of Lanark		Hon. Henry Percy (Note: Percy was re-elected to serve in the Long Parliament but was also elected for Northumberland, which he chose to represent, and did not sit again for Portsmouth)	Royalist
November 1640	Hon. George Goring	Royalist	Hon. Henry Percy	Royalist
1640 (?)	Hon. George Goring	Royalist	Edward Dowse (Note: This list follows that given by Brunton & Pennington. Cobbett lists Dowse as elected after the Civil War to replace Nicholas Weston, disabled from sitting in 1642, but Brunton & Pennington's more recent research records Weston as MP for Newtown (Isle of Wight).)	Parliamentarian
August 1642	Goring disabled from sitting – seat vacant		Edward Dowse	Parliamentarian
1646	Edward Boote		Edward Dowse	Parliamentarian
December 1648	Boote not recorded as sitting after Pride's Purge		Dowce died late 1648 – seat left vacant	
1653	Portsmouth was unrepresented in the Barebones Parliament and the First and Second Parliaments of the Protectorate			
1654	Nathaniel Whetham		Portsmouth had only one seat in the First and Second Parliaments of the Protectorate	
1656	Thomas Smith		Portsmouth had only one seat in the First and Second Parliaments of the Protectorate	
January 1659	Francis Willoughby		John Child	
May 1659	Portsmouth was not represented in the restored Rump			
April 1660	Richard Norton		Henry Whithed	
May 1660	Andrew Henley		Henry Whithed	
1661	Richard Norton		Sir George Carteret, Bt	
February 1679	George Legge		Sir John Kempthorne	
August 1679	George Legge		Richard Norton	
1685	William Legge		Henry Slingsby	
1689	Richard Norton		Henry Slingsby	
1690	Edward Russell		Nicholas Hedger	
1695	Matthew Aylmer		Nicholas Hedger	
1696	John Gibson		Nicholas Hedger	
1698	Thomas Erle		Sir George Rooke	
January 1702	John Gibson		Sir George Rooke	
July 1702	Thomas Erle (Note: Erle was also elected for Wareham, which he chose to represent, and did not for Portsmouth in this Parliament)		Sir George Rooke	
December 1702	William Gifford		Sir George Rooke	
May 1708	Thomas Erle		George Churchill	Tory
December 1708	Sir Thomas Littleton, Bt		George Churchill	Tory
January 1710 (Note: On petition, the result of the 1710 election was overturned, and Wager and Jennings were declared not to have been duly elected)	Sir Charles Wager		George Churchill	Tory
October 1710	Sir Charles Wager		Sir John Jennings	
1711	Admiral Sir James Wishart		Sir William Gifford	
1713	Admiral Sir James Wishart		Sir Thomas Mackworth, Bt	
1715	Sir Charles Wager		Sir Edward Ernle, Bt	
1722	Sir Charles Wager		Sir John Norris	
1734	Thomas Lewis		Philip Cavendish	
1737	Charles Stewart		Philip Cavendish	
February 1741	Edward Vernon		Philip Cavendish	
May 1741	Martin Bladen		Philip Cavendish	
1743	Martin Bladen		Sir Charles Hardy	
1744	Martin Bladen		Isaac Townsend	
1746	Thomas Gore (Note: Gore was re-elected in 1747, but had also been elected for Bedford, which he chose to represent, and did not sit again for Portsmouth)		Isaac Townsend	
15 December 1747	Hon. Edward Legge (Note: It was soon afterwards discovered that Legge, who had been elected while on naval service overseas, had been dead 87 days before his election, which was declared void)	Whig	Isaac Townsend	
28 December 1747	Sir Edward Hawke (Note: Admiral from 1757)		Isaac Townsend	
1754	Sir Edward Hawke		Sir William Rowley	
1761	Sir Edward Hawke		Sir Matthew Fetherstonhaugh, Bt	
1774	Sir Edward Hawke		Peter Taylor	
1776	Maurice Suckling		Peter Taylor	
1777	Maurice Suckling		Sir William Gordon	
1778	Hon. Robert Monckton		Sir William Gordon	
1782	Sir Henry Fetherstonhaugh, Bt	Non-partisan	Sir William Gordon	
1783	Sir Henry Fetherstonhaugh, Bt	Non-partisan	Hon. Thomas Erskine	Whig
1784	Sir Henry Fetherstonhaugh, Bt	Non-partisan	Hon. William Cornwallis	Non-partisan
1790	Sir Henry Fetherstonhaugh, Bt	Whig	Hon. Thomas Erskine	Whig
1796	Lord Hugh Seymour	Non-partisan	Hon. Thomas Erskine	Whig
1801	John Markham	Whig	Hon. Thomas Erskine	Whig
February 1806	John Markham	Whig	Hon. David Erskine	
November 1806	John Markham	Whig	Sir Thomas Miller, Bt	Whig
1816	John Markham	Whig	John Bonham Carter	Whig
1818	Sir George Cockburn, Bt	Tory	John Bonham Carter	Whig
1820	John Markham	Whig	John Bonham Carter	Whig
1826	Francis Baring	Whig	John Bonham Carter	Whig
1838	Francis Baring	Whig	Sir George Thomas Staunton	Whig
1852	Francis Baring	Whig	The Viscount Monck	Whig
1857	Francis Baring	Whig	Sir James Dalrymple-Horn-Elphinstone, Bt	Conservative
1859	Francis Baring	Liberal	Sir James Dalrymple-Horn-Elphinstone, Bt	Conservative
1865	William Henry Stone	Liberal	Stephen Gaselee	Liberal
1868	William Henry Stone	Liberal	Sir James Dalrymple-Horn-Elphinstone, Bt	Conservative
1874	Thomas Charles Bruce	Conservative	Sir James Dalrymple-Horn-Elphinstone, Bt	Conservative
1880	Thomas Charles Bruce	Conservative	Sir Henry Drummond Wolff	Conservative
1885	Sir William Crossman	Liberal	Philip Vanderbyl	Liberal
1886	Sir William Crossman	Liberal Unionist	Sir Samuel Wilson	Conservative
1892	Sir John Baker	Liberal	Walter Clough	Liberal
1900	Sir John Baker	Liberal	Thomas Bramsdon	Liberal
1900	James Majendie	Conservative	Reginald Lucas	Conservative
1906	Sir John Baker	Liberal	Thomas Bramsdon	Liberal
1910	Lord Charles Beresford	Conservative	Sir Bertram Falle	Liberal Unionist
1912	Lord Charles Beresford	Conservative	Sir Bertram Falle	Unionist
1916	Sir Hedworth Meux	Unionist	Sir Bertram Falle	Unionist
1918	Constituency abolished			

== Election notes ==
The bloc vote electoral system was used in two seat elections and first past the post for single member by-elections. Each voter had up to as many votes as there were seats to be filled. Votes had to be cast by a spoken declaration, in public, at the hustings (until the secret ballot was introduced in 1872).

Note on percentage change calculations: Where there was only one candidate of a party in successive elections, for the same number of seats, change is calculated on the party percentage vote. Where there was more than one candidate, in one or both successive elections for the same number of seats, then change is calculated on the individual percentage vote.

Note on sources: The information for the election results given below is taken from Sedgwick 1715–1754, Namier and Brooke 1754–1790, Stooks Smith 1790–1832 and from Craig thereafter. Where Stooks Smith gives additional information or differs from the other sources this is indicated in a note after the result.

== Election results 1715–1800 ==
1710s – 1720s – 1730s – 1740s – 1750s – 1760s – 1770s – 1780s – 1790s

=== Elections in the 1710s ===
General election 31 January 1715: Portsmouth (2 seats)
Party	Candidate	Votes	%	±%
Nonpartisan	Edward Ernle	Unopposed	N/A	N/A
Nonpartisan	Charles Wager	Unopposed	N/A	N/A

- Seat vacated when Wager was appointed to an office

By-Election 7 April 1715: Portsmouth
Party	Candidate	Votes	%	±%
Nonpartisan	Charles Wager	Unopposed	N/A	N/A
Nonpartisan hold		Swing	N/A	

- Seat vacated when Wager was appointed to an office

By-Election 28 March 1718: Portsmouth
Party	Candidate	Votes	%	±%
Nonpartisan	Charles Wager	Unopposed	N/A	N/A
Nonpartisan hold		Swing	N/A	

=== Elections in the 1720s ===
General election 24 March 1722: Portsmouth (2 seats)
Party	Candidate	Votes	%	±%
Nonpartisan	John Norris	Unopposed	N/A	N/A
Nonpartisan	Charles Wager	Unopposed	N/A	N/A

General election 19 August 1727: Portsmouth (2 seats)
Party	Candidate	Votes	%	±%
Nonpartisan	John Norris	Unopposed	N/A	N/A
Nonpartisan	Charles Wager	Unopposed	N/A	N/A

=== Elections in the 1730s ===
General election 24 April 1734: Portsmouth (2 seats)
Party	Candidate	Votes	%	±%
Nonpartisan	Thomas Lewis	Unopposed	N/A	N/A
Nonpartisan	Philip Cavendish	Unopposed	N/A	N/A

- Death of Lewis

By-Election 10 February 1737: Portsmouth
Party	Candidate	Votes	%	±%
Nonpartisan	Charles Stewart	Unopposed	N/A	N/A
Nonpartisan hold		Swing	N/A	

=== Elections in the 1740s ===
- Death of Stewart

By-Election 21 February 1741: Portsmouth
Party	Candidate	Votes	%	±%
Tory	Edward Vernon	Unopposed	N/A	N/A
Nonpartisan hold		Swing	N/A	

General election 6 May 1741: Portsmouth (2 seats)
Party	Candidate	Votes	%	±%
Nonpartisan	Philip Cavendish	60	48.78	N/A
Nonpartisan	Martin Bladen	54	43.90	N/A
Tory	Edward Vernon	9	7.32	N/A
Turnout		123	N/A	N/A

- Seat vacated when Cavendish was appointed to an office

By-Election 23 March 1742: Portsmouth
Party	Candidate	Votes	%	±%
Nonpartisan	Philip Cavendish	Unopposed	N/A	N/A
Nonpartisan hold		Swing	N/A	

- Death of Cavendish

By-Election 14 December 1743: Portsmouth
Party	Candidate	Votes	%	±%
Nonpartisan	Sir Charles Hardy	Unopposed	N/A	N/A
Nonpartisan hold		Swing	N/A	

- Death of Hardy

By-Election 28 December 1744: Portsmouth
Party	Candidate	Votes	%	±%
Nonpartisan	Isaac Townsend	Unopposed	N/A	N/A
Nonpartisan hold		Swing	N/A	

- Death of Bladen

By-Election 3 March 1746: Portsmouth
Party	Candidate	Votes	%	±%
Nonpartisan	Thomas Gore	Unopposed	N/A	N/A
Nonpartisan hold		Swing	N/A	

General election 1 July 1747: Portsmouth (2 seats)
Party	Candidate	Votes	%	±%
Nonpartisan	Isaac Townsend	Unopposed	N/A	N/A
Nonpartisan	Thomas Gore	Unopposed	N/A	N/A

- Gore chose to sit for Bedford

By-Election 15 December 1747: Portsmouth
Party	Candidate	Votes	%	±%
Nonpartisan	Edward Legge	Unopposed	N/A	N/A
Nonpartisan hold		Swing	N/A	

- Election declared void on 19 December 1747 as, unknown to anyone in England on 15 December, Legge had died on 19 September 1747.

By-Election 28 December 1747: Portsmouth
Party	Candidate	Votes	%	±%
Nonpartisan	Edward Hawke	Unopposed	N/A	N/A
Nonpartisan hold		Swing	N/A	

=== Elections in the 1750s ===
General election 18 April 1754: Portsmouth (2 seats)
Party	Candidate	Votes	%	±%
Nonpartisan	William Rowley	Unopposed	N/A	N/A
Nonpartisan	Edward Hawke	Unopposed	N/A	N/A

- Seat vacated when Rowley was appointed a Lord Commissioner of the Admiralty

By-Election 25 April 1757: Portsmouth
Party	Candidate	Votes	%	±%
Nonpartisan	William Rowley	Unopposed	N/A	N/A
Nonpartisan hold		Swing	N/A	

=== Elections in the 1760s ===
General election 31 March 1761: Portsmouth (2 seats)
Party	Candidate	Votes	%	±%
Nonpartisan	Edward Hawke	Unopposed	N/A	N/A
Nonpartisan	Matthew Fetherstonhaugh	Unopposed	N/A	N/A

- Seat vacated when Hawke was appointed a Lord Commissioner of the Admiralty

By-Election 10 December 1766: Portsmouth
Party	Candidate	Votes	%	±%
Nonpartisan	Edward Hawke	Unopposed	N/A	N/A
Nonpartisan hold		Swing	N/A	

General election 22 March 1768: Portsmouth (2 seats)
Party	Candidate	Votes	%	±%
Nonpartisan	Edward Hawke	Unopposed	N/A	N/A
Nonpartisan	Matthew Fetherstonhaugh	Unopposed	N/A	N/A

- Death of Fetherstonhaugh

=== Elections in the 1770s ===
By-Election 29 March 1774: Portsmouth
Party	Candidate	Votes	%	±%
Nonpartisan	Peter Taylor	39	61.90	N/A
Nonpartisan	Joshua Iremonger	24	38.10	N/A
Majority		15	23.80	N/A
Nonpartisan hold		Swing	N/A	

General election 10 October 1774: Portsmouth (2 seats)
Party	Candidate	Votes	%	±%
Nonpartisan	Edward Hawke	65	47.79	N/A
Nonpartisan	Peter Taylor	37	27.21	N/A
Nonpartisan	Joshua Iremonger	34	25.00	N/A

- Creation of Hawke as a peer

By-Election 18 May 1776: Portsmouth
Party	Candidate	Votes	%	±%
Nonpartisan	Maurice Suckling	Unopposed	N/A	N/A
Nonpartisan hold		Swing	N/A	

- Death of Taylor

By-Election 26 November 1777: Portsmouth
Party	Candidate	Votes	%	±%
Nonpartisan	William Gordon	23	65.71	N/A
Nonpartisan	Henry Fetherstonhaugh	12	34.29	N/A
Majority		11	31.43	N/A
Nonpartisan hold		Swing	N/A	

- Death of Suckling

By-Election 10 August 1778: Portsmouth
Party	Candidate	Votes	%	±%
Nonpartisan	Robert Monckton	Unopposed	N/A	N/A
Nonpartisan hold		Swing	N/A	

=== Elections in the 1780s ===
General election 9 September 1780: Portsmouth (2 seats)
Party	Candidate	Votes	%	±%
Nonpartisan	Robert Monckton	34	52.31	N/A
Nonpartisan	William Gordon	20	30.77	N/A
Nonpartisan	Henry Fetherstonhaugh	11	16.92	N/A

- Death of Monckton

By-Election 5 June 1782: Portsmouth
Party	Candidate	Votes	%	±%
Nonpartisan	Henry Fetherstonhaugh	Unopposed	N/A	N/A
Nonpartisan hold		Swing	N/A	

- Seat vacated on the grant of a pension, at the pleasure of the Crown, to Gordon

By-Election 28 July 1783: Portsmouth
Party	Candidate	Votes	%	±%
Whig	Thomas Erskine	Unopposed	N/A	N/A
Whig gain from Nonpartisan		Swing	N/A	

- Source for party: Stooks Smith

General election 1 April 1784: Portsmouth (2 seats)
Party	Candidate	Votes	%	±%
Nonpartisan	Henry Fetherstonhaugh	Unopposed	N/A	N/A
Nonpartisan	William Cornwallis	Unopposed	N/A	N/A

=== Elections in the 1790s ===
General election 1790: Portsmouth (2 seats)
Party	Candidate	Votes	%	±%
Whig	Henry Fetherstonhaugh	Unopposed	N/A	N/A
Whig	Thomas Erskine	Unopposed	N/A	N/A

General election 1796: Portsmouth (2 seats)
Party	Candidate	Votes	%	±%
Whig	Thomas Erskine	Unopposed	N/A	N/A
Nonpartisan	Hugh Seymour	Unopposed	N/A	N/A

- Seymour is referred to as Hugh Seymour-Conway in the above list of members of parliament

== Election results 1801–1918 ==
1800s – 1810s – 1820s – 1830s – 1840s – 1850s – 1860s – 1870s – 1880s – 1890s – 1900s – 1910s

=== Elections in the 1800s ===
- Death of Seymour

By-Election November 1801: Portsmouth
Party	Candidate	Votes	%	±%
Whig	John Markham	Unopposed	N/A	N/A
Whig gain from Nonpartisan				

General election 1802: Portsmouth (2 seats)
Party	Candidate	Votes	%	±%
Whig	Thomas Erskine	Unopposed	N/A	N/A
Whig	John Markham	Unopposed	N/A	N/A

- The above list of members of parliament includes David Montagu Erskine as an MP in 1806, in succession to his father Thomas Erskine (who became Lord Chancellor and was elevated to the peerage as the 1st Baron Erskine in 1806). Stooks Smith does not record this election

General election 1806: Portsmouth (2 seats)
Party	Candidate	Votes	%	±%
Whig	John Markham	Unopposed	N/A	N/A
Whig	Thomas Miller	Unopposed	N/A	N/A

General election 1807: Portsmouth (2 seats)
Party	Candidate	Votes	%	±%
Whig	John Markham	Unopposed	N/A	N/A
Whig	Thomas Miller	Unopposed	N/A	N/A

=== Elections in the 1810s ===
General election 1812: Portsmouth (2 seats)
Party	Candidate	Votes	%	±%
Whig	John Markham	Unopposed	N/A	N/A
Whig	Thomas Miller	Unopposed	N/A	N/A

- Death of Miller

By-Election February 1817: Portsmouth
Party	Candidate	Votes	%	±%
Whig	John Bonham-Carter	Unopposed	N/A	N/A
Whig hold				

General election 1818: Portsmouth (2 seats)
Party	Candidate	Votes	%	±%
Whig	John Bonham-Carter	Unopposed	N/A	N/A
Tory	George Cockburn	Unopposed	N/A	N/A

=== Elections in the 1820s ===
General election 1820: Portsmouth (2 seats)
Party	Candidate	Votes	%	±%
Whig	John Bonham-Carter	53	48.62	N/A
Whig	John Markham	34	31.19	N/A
Tory	George Cockburn	22	20.18	N/A
Majority		12	11.01	N/A
Turnout		109		N/A
Whig hold		Swing		
Tory gain from Whig		Swing		

General election 1826: Portsmouth (2 seats)
Party	Candidate	Votes	%	±%
Whig	John Bonham-Carter	Unopposed	N/A	N/A
Whig	Francis Baring	Unopposed	N/A	N/A

=== Elections in the 1830s ===
General election 1830: Portsmouth (2 seats)
Party	Candidate	Votes	%
Whig	John Bonham-Carter	Unopposed	
Whig	Francis Baring	Unopposed	
Whig hold			
Whig hold			

- Seat vacated on the appointment of Baring as a Lord Commissioner of the Treasury

By-election, 29 November 1830: Portsmouth
Party	Candidate	Votes	%
Whig	Francis Baring	Unopposed	
Whig hold			

General election 1831: Portsmouth (2 seats)
Party	Candidate	Votes	%
Whig	John Bonham-Carter	Unopposed	
Whig	Francis Baring	Unopposed	
Registered electors		49	
Whig hold			
Whig hold			

General election 1832: Portsmouth (2 seats)
Party	Candidate	Votes	%
Whig	John Bonham-Carter	826	46.1
Whig	Francis Baring	707	39.5
Radical	Charles Napier	258	14.4
Majority		449	25.1
Turnout		983	75.9
Registered electors		1,295	
Whig hold			
Whig hold			

General election 1835: Portsmouth (2 seats)
Party	Candidate	Votes	%	±%
Whig	John Bonham-Carter	643	30.5	−15.6
Whig	Francis Baring	571	27.1	−12.4
Conservative	Charles Rowley	557	26.4	New
Radical	Charles Napier	335	15.9	+1.5
Majority		14	0.7	−24.4
Turnout		1,143	85.3	+9.4
Registered electors		1,340		
Whig hold		Swing	−8.2	
Whig hold		Swing	−6.6	

General election 1837: Portsmouth (2 seats)
Party	Candidate	Votes	%	±%
Whig	Francis Baring	635	28.6	−1.9
Whig	John Bonham-Carter	630	28.4	+1.3
Conservative	George Cockburn	518	23.3	+10.1
Conservative	James Harris	438	19.7	+6.5
Majority		112	5.1	+4.4
Turnout		1,118	71.6	−13.7
Registered electors		1,561		
Whig hold		Swing	−5.1	
Whig hold		Swing	−3.5	

Note (1837): Stooks Smith gives a registered electorate figure of 1,517; but Craig's figure is used to calculate turnout.

- Death of Carter

By-election, 26 February 1838: Portsmouth
Party	Candidate	Votes	%
Whig	George Staunton	Unopposed	
Whig hold			

Note (1838): Daniel Quarrier (Conservative) was a candidate for this by-election, but retired before the poll.

- Seat vacated on the appointment of Baring as Chancellor of the Exchequer.

By-election, 30 August 1839: Portsmouth
Party	Candidate	Votes	%	±%
Whig	Francis Baring	Unopposed		
Whig hold				

=== Elections in the 1840s ===
General election 1841: Portsmouth (2 seats)
Party	Candidate	Votes	%	±%
Whig	Francis Baring	Unopposed		
Whig	George Staunton	Unopposed		
Registered electors		1,834		
Whig hold				
Whig hold				

General election 1847: Portsmouth (2 seats)
Party	Candidate	Votes	%	±%
Whig	Francis Baring	Unopposed		
Whig	George Staunton	Unopposed		
Registered electors		2,068		
Whig hold				
Whig hold				

- Seat vacated on the appointment of Baring as First Lord of the Admiralty..

By-election, 6 February 1849: Portsmouth
Party	Candidate	Votes	%	±%
Whig	Francis Baring	Unopposed		
Whig hold				

=== Elections in the 1850s ===
General election 1852: Portsmouth (2 seats)
Party	Candidate	Votes	%	±%
Whig	Francis Baring	Unopposed		
Whig	Charles Monck	Unopposed		
Registered electors		3,332		
Whig hold				
Whig hold				

- Note (1852): Monck was a peer in the peerage of Ireland.
- Seat vacated on the appointment of Monck as a Lord Commissioner of the Treasury.

By-election, 14 March 1855: Portsmouth
Party	Candidate	Votes	%	±%
Whig	Charles Monck	1,478	75.8	N/A
Radical	Stephen Gaselee	473	24.2	N/A
Majority		1,005	51.6	N/A
Turnout		1,951	56.7	N/A
Registered electors		3,439		
Whig hold		Swing	N/A	

General election 1857: Portsmouth (2 seats)
Party	Candidate	Votes	%	±%
Conservative	James Dalrymple-Horn-Elphinstone	1,522	33.9	New
Whig	Francis Baring	1,496	33.3	N/A
Whig	Charles Monck	1,476	32.8	N/A
Majority		46	1.1	N/A
Turnout		2,247 (est)	61.2 (est)	N/A
Registered electors		3,671		
Conservative gain from Whig		Swing	N/A	
Whig hold		Swing	N/A	

- Note (1857): Number of voters unknown. The turnout is estimated by dividing the number of votes by two. To the extent that electors did not use both their votes, the figure given will be an underestimate of actual turnout.

General election 1859: Portsmouth (2 seats)
Party	Candidate	Votes	%	±%
Conservative	James Dalrymple-Horn-Elphinstone	1,640	27.1	+10.1
Liberal	Francis Baring	1,574	26.0	−7.3
Conservative	Thomas Charles Bruce	1,447	23.9	+6.9
Liberal	Henry Keppel	1,386	22.9	−9.9
Turnout		3,024 (est)	79.1 (est)	+17.9
Registered electors		3,821		
Majority		66	1.1	0.0
Conservative hold		Swing	+9.4	
Majority		127	2.1	N/A
Liberal hold		Swing	−7.9	

- Note (1859): Estimated turnout, see the 1857 note.

=== Elections in the 1860s ===
General election 1865: Portsmouth (2 seats)
Party	Candidate	Votes	%	±%
Liberal	William Henry Stone	2,164	28.8	+2.8
Liberal	Stephen Gaselee	2,103	28.0	+5.1
Conservative	James Dalrymple-Horn-Elphinstone	1,677	22.4	−4.7
Conservative	Thomas Charles Bruce	1,559	20.8	−3.1
Majority		426	5.6	+3.5
Turnout		3,752 (est)	80.3 (est)	+1.2
Registered electors		4,670		
Liberal hold		Swing	+3.4	
Liberal gain from Conservative		Swing	+4.5	

- Note (1865): Estimated turnout, see the 1857 note.
- Expansion of the electorate provided for by the Reform Act 1867

General election 1868: Portsmouth (2 seats)
Party	Candidate	Votes	%	±%
Conservative	James Dalrymple-Horn-Elphinstone	5,306	41.5	−1.7
Liberal	William Henry Stone	3,785	29.6	+0.8
Liberal	Stephen Gaselee	3,687	28.9	+0.9
Majority		1,521	11.9	N/A
Turnout		9,042 (est)	78.0 (est)	−2.3
Registered electors		11,597		
Conservative gain from Liberal		Swing	−1.7	
Liberal hold		Swing	+0.8	

- Note (1868): Estimated turnout, see the 1857 note.

=== Elections in the 1870s ===
General election 1874: Portsmouth (2 seats)
Party	Candidate	Votes	%	±%
Conservative	James Dalrymple-Horn-Elphinstone	5,927	28.2	+7.4
Conservative	Thomas Charles Bruce	5,879	27.9	+7.1
Liberal	William Henry Stone	4,644	22.1	−7.5
Liberal	Sir Wyndham Portal, 1st Baronet	4,588	21.8	−7.1
Majority		1,235	5.8	−5.9
Turnout		10,519	70.5	−7.5
Registered electors		14,931		
Conservative hold		Swing	+7.4	
Conservative gain from Liberal		Swing	+7.2	

- Note (1874): Estimated turnout, see the 1857 note.
- Seat vacated on the appointment of Elphinstone as a Lord Commissioner of the Treasury

By-Election 16 March 1874: Portsmouth
Party	Candidate	Votes	%	±%
Conservative	James Dalrymple-Horn-Elphinstone	Unopposed		
Conservative hold				

=== Elections in the 1880s ===
General election 1880: Portsmouth (2 seats)
Party	Candidate	Votes	%	±%
Conservative	Thomas Charles Bruce	6,683	26.4	−1.5
Conservative	Henry Drummond Wolff	6,593	26.0	−2.2
Liberal	John Freeman Norris	6,040	23.8	+1.7
Liberal	Edmund Verney	6,023	23.8	+2.0
Majority		553	2.2	−3.6
Turnout		12,670	77.0	+6.5
Registered electors		16,463		
Conservative hold		Swing	−1.6	
Conservative hold		Swing	−2.1	

- Note (1880): Estimated turnout, see the 1857 note.
- Electorate expanded by the Representation of the People Act 1884

General election 1885: Portsmouth (2 seats)
Party	Candidate	Votes	%	±%
Liberal	William Crossman	8,367	26.3	+2.5
Liberal	Philip Vanderbyl	8,214	25.8	+2.0
Conservative	Thomas Charles Bruce	7,650	24.0	−2.4
Conservative	Henry Drummond Wolff	7,595	23.9	−2.1
Majority		564	1.8	N/A
Turnout		16,068	79.2	+2.2
Registered electors		20,279		
Liberal gain from Conservative		Swing	+2.5	
Liberal gain from Conservative		Swing	+2.1	

Sir John Baker

General election 1886: Portsmouth (2 seats)
Party	Candidate	Votes	%	±%
Liberal Unionist	William Crossman	8,482	27.2	+3.2
Conservative	Samuel Wilson	8,325	26.8	+2.9
Liberal	Philip Vanderbyl	7,196	23.2	−2.6
Liberal	John Baker	7,069	22.8	−3.5
Turnout		15,722	77.5	−1.7
Registered electors		20,279		
Majority		1,286	4.0	N/A
Liberal Unionist gain from Liberal		Swing	+2.9	
Majority		1,256	4.0	N/A
Conservative gain from Liberal		Swing	+3.2	

=== Elections in the 1890s ===
Walter Clough

General election 1892: Portsmouth (2 seats)
Party	Candidate	Votes	%	±%
Liberal	John Baker	9,643	25.9	+3.1
Liberal	Walter Clough	9,448	25.4	+2.2
Conservative	George Henry Smith Willis	9,135	24.5	−2.3
Liberal Unionist	Anthony Ashley	9,000	24.2	−3.0
Majority		313	0.9	N/A
Turnout		18,731	80.6	+3.1
Registered electors		23,237		
Liberal gain from Liberal Unionist		Swing	+3.1	
Liberal gain from Conservative		Swing	+2.3	

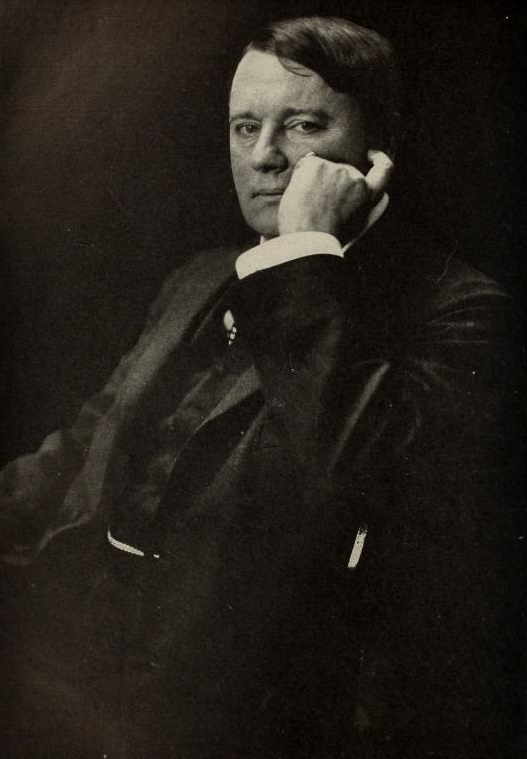
Harmsworth

General election 1895: Portsmouth (2 seats)
Party	Candidate	Votes	%	±%
Liberal	John Baker	10,451	26.2	+0.3
Liberal	Walter Clough	10,255	25.6	+0.2
Conservative	Alfred Harmsworth	9,717	24.3	−0.2
Liberal Unionist	Anthony Ashley	9,567	23.9	−0.3
Majority		538	1.3	+0.4
Turnout		20,129	83.7	+3.1
Registered electors		24,057		
Liberal hold		Swing	+0.3	
Liberal hold		Swing	+0.3	

=== Elections in the 1900s ===
Bramsdon

1900 Portsmouth by-election
Party	Candidate	Votes	%	±%
Liberal	Thomas Bramsdon	10,287	51.4	−0.4
Conservative	James Majendie	9,708	48.6	+0.4
Majority		579	2.8	+1.5
Turnout		19,995	74.9	−8.8
Registered electors		26,698		
Liberal hold		Swing	−0.4	

General election 1900: Portsmouth (2 seats)
Party	Candidate	Votes	%	±%
Conservative	James Majendie	10,818	26.1	+1.8
Conservative	Reginald Lucas	10,383	25.1	+1.2
Liberal	John Baker	10,214	24.6	−1.6
Liberal	Thomas Bramsdon	10,031	24.2	−1.4
Majority		169	0.5	N/A
Turnout		21,072	78.9	−4.8
Registered electors		26,698		
Conservative gain from Liberal		Swing	+1.7	
Conservative gain from Liberal		Swing	+1.3	

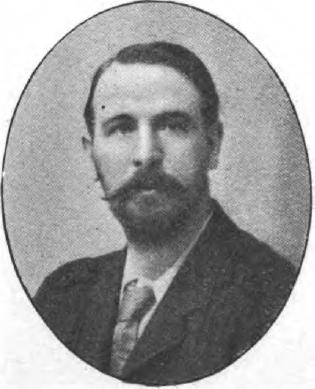
Sanders

General election 1906: Portsmouth (2 seats)
Party	Candidate	Votes	%	±%
Liberal	Thomas Bramsdon	10,500	22.6	−1.6
Liberal	John Baker	10,236	22.0	−2.6
Labour Repr. Cmte.	William Sanders	8,172	17.6	New
Conservative	E.W. Hills	7,970	17.1	−9.0
Conservative	A. Whitelaw	7,752	16.7	−8.4
Naval	Fred T. Jane	1,859	4.0	New
Majority		2,530	5.5	N/A
Turnout		25,478	82.8	+3.9
Registered electors		30,754		
Liberal gain from Conservative		Swing	+3.7	
Liberal gain from Conservative		Swing	+2.9	

=== Elections in the 1910s ===
General election January 1910: Portsmouth (2 seats)
Party	Candidate	Votes	%	±%
Conservative	Lord Charles Beresford	16,777	28.7	+11.6
Liberal Unionist	Bertram Falle	15,592	26.8	+10.1
Liberal	Thomas Bramsdon	12,397	21.3	−1.3
Liberal	Richard Lambert	9,965	17.1	−4.9
Labour	William Sanders	3,529	6.1	−11.5
Turnout		30,100	89.4	+6.6
Registered electors		33,666		
Majority		4,380	7.4	N/A
Conservative gain from Liberal		Swing	+6.5	
Majority		5,627	9.7	N/A
Liberal Unionist gain from Liberal		Swing	+7.5	

Hemmerde

General election December 1910: Portsmouth (2 seats)
Party	Candidate	Votes	%	±%
Conservative	Lord Charles Beresford	15,125	26.9	−1.8
Liberal Unionist	Bertram Falle	14,856	26.5	−0.3
Liberal	Edward Hemmerde	13,146	23.4	+2.1
Liberal	Henry Harben	13,013	23.2	+4.1
Turnout		28,236	83.9	−5.5
Registered electors		33,666		
Majority		1,979	3.5	−3.9
Conservative hold		Swing	−2.0	
Majority		1,843	3.3	−6.4
Liberal Unionist hold		Swing	−2.2	

1916 Portsmouth by-election
Party	Candidate	Votes	%	±%
Unionist	Hedworth Meux	Unopposed		
Unionist hold				

== Sources ==
- Boundaries of Parliamentary Constituencies 1885–1972, compiled and edited by F.W.S. Craig (Parliamentary Reference Publications 1972)
- British Parliamentary Election Results 1832–1885, compiled and edited by F.W.S. Craig (Macmillan Press 1977)
- British Parliamentary Election Results 1885–1918, compiled and edited by F.W.S. Craig (Macmillan Press 1974)
- The House of Commons 1715–1754, by Romney Sedgwick (HMSO 1970)
- The House of Commons 1754–1790, by Sir Lewis Namier and John Brooke (HMSO 1964)
- The Parliaments of England by Henry Stooks Smith (1st edition published in three volumes 1844–50), second edition edited (in one volume) by F.W.S. Craig (Political Reference Publications 1973))
- Who's Who of British members of parliament: Volume I 1832–1885, edited by M. Stenton (The Harvester Press 1976)
- Who's Who of British members of parliament, Volume II 1886–1918, edited by M. Stenton and S. Lees (Harvester Press 1978)
- Who's Who of British members of parliament, Volume III 1919–1945, edited by M. Stenton and S. Lees (Harvester Press 1979)
- Robert Beatson, A Chronological Register of Both Houses of Parliament (London: Longman, Hurst, Res & Orme, 1807)
- D Brunton & D H Pennington, Members of the Long Parliament (London: George Allen & Unwin, 1954)
- Cobbett's Parliamentary history of England, from the Norman Conquest in 1066 to the year 1803 (London: Thomas Hansard, 1808)
- Leigh Rayment's Historical List of MPs – Constituencies beginning with "P" (part 2)
