= Gaselee =

Gaselee is a surname. Notable people with the surname include:

- Alfred Gaselee (1844–1918), British Indian Army general

- Gaselee Expedition, 1900 expedition, part of the war of the Boxer Rebellion

- Stephen Gaselee (diplomat) (1882–1943), British diplomat, writer, and librarian
- Stephen Gaselee (judge) (1762–1839), British judge
- Stephen Gaselee (serjeant-at-law) (1807–1883), British serjeant-at-law and politician
