= Jack Fryer =

Jack Fryer may refer to:

- Jack Fryer (footballer, born 1877), English footballer
- Jack Fryer (footballer, born 1911), English footballer
- John Denis Fryer (known as Jack Fryer), Australian soldier and university student

== See also ==
- John Fryer (disambiguation)
