= Robert Abraham =

Robert Abraham may refer to:

- Robert Abraham (American football) (born 1960), American football player
- Robert Abraham (architect) (1773–1850), English surveyor and architect
- Robert Abraham (MP) (1410–1470), English Member of Parliament for Portsmouth

== See also ==
- Robert Abrams (born 1938), American lawyer and politician
- Robert B. Abrams (born 1960), US Army General
- Robert D. Abrahams (1905–1998), American lawyer and writer
