= Henry Abraham =

Henry Abraham may refer to:

- Henry J. Abraham (1921–2020), American law scholar
- Henry David Abraham (born 1942), American psychiatrist and academic
- Luther Abraham (Henry Diwakar Luther Abraham, 1908–1987), bishop and theologian
- Henry Abraham (MP), 15th-century English politician, MP for Portsmouth
