= 1874 Portsmouth by-election =

UK Parliamentary by-election

The 1874 Portsmouth by-election was fought on 16 March 1874. The by-election was fought due to the incumbent Conservative MP, James Dalrymple-Horn-Elphinstone, becoming Lord Commissioner of the Treasury. It was retained by the incumbent.
