= John Bonham-Carter (1788–1838) =

British politician and barrister

John Bonham-Carter DL JP

Member of Parliament for Portsmouth
- In office 9 October 1816 – 17 February 1838
- Preceded by: Sir Thomas Miller; John Markham
- Succeeded by: Francis Baring; Sir George Staunton

Personal details
- Born: John Carter; 22 September 1788
- Died: 17 February 1838 (aged 49)
- Spouse: Joanna Maria Smith (m. 1816)
- Relations: See Bonham Carter family
- Parent: Sir John Carter
- Education: Trinity College, Cambridge

John Bonham-Carter DL JP (22 September 1788 – 17 February 1838) was a British politician and barrister.

== Early life ==
John Carter was born on 22 September 1788 into the "Whig oligarchy which dominated the corporation of Portsmouth." He was the son of Sir John Carter (1741–1808), who served nine times as Mayor of Portsmouth, and his wife Dorothy Cuthbert. His paternal grandfather was the merchant John Carter, and his maternal grandfather was George Cuthbert of Portsmouth.

He was educated at Miss Whishaw and Mr. Forester's schools in Portsmouth, then in 1800 joined the Unitarian Academy in Cheshunt, Hertfordshire, and from 1801 was taught at Higham Hill in Walthamstow, Essex. He graduated from Trinity College, Cambridge in 1806.

In 1827, he changed his name to Bonham-Carter to inherit the estate of his cousin Thomas Bonham.

== Career ==
Bonham-Carter was a Justice of Peace and Deputy Lieutenant. He was High Sheriff of Hampshire in 1829 and Whig Member of Parliament (MP) for Portsmouth from 1816 to 1838.

== Personal life and death ==
On 25 December 1816, he married Joanna Maria Smith (1792–1884), daughter of abolitionist William Smith. Joanna's sister Frances was the mother of Florence Nightingale, and her brother Benjamin was the father of Barbara Bodichon and Benjamin Leigh Smith. Together, John and Joanna were the parents of several children, including:

- John Bonham-Carter (1817–1884), who married Mary Baring, daughter of Francis Baring, 1st Baron Northbrook.
- Joanna Hilary Bonham Carter (1821–1865), who was an artist and friend of political journalist Harriet Martineau. The National Portrait Gallery has three lithographs of a drawing by her of Florence Nightingale.
- Alfred Bonham Carter (1825–1910), who married Mary Henrietta Norman.
- Henry Bonham Carter (1827–1921), married Sibella Charlotte Norman
- Alice Bonham Carter (1828–1912)
- Hugh Bonham Carter (1832–1896), married Jane Margaret McDonald (d. 1911)
- Elinor Mary Bonham Carter (1837–1923), who married jurist Albert Venn Dicey, brother of author Edward Dicey and cousin of Sir Leslie Stephen (father of Virginia Woolf and Vanessa Bell) and Judge James Fitzjames Stephen.

Bonham-Carter died on 17 February 1838.

=== Descendants ===
Later generations of the Bonham Carter family include notable public figures such as Henry's son Maurice Bonham-Carter, son-in-law and Principal Private Secretary to H. H. Asquith, and Maurice's granddaughter, actress Helena Bonham Carter.

Parliament of the United Kingdom
Preceded by Sir Thomas Miller; John Markham	Member of Parliament for Portsmouth; 1816–1838; With: John Markham 1816–1818; Sir George Cockburn 1818–1820; John Markham 1820–1826; Francis Baring 1826–1838	Succeeded by Francis Baring; Sir George Staunton
