= William Henry Stone (MP) =

English Liberal politician

William Henry Stone (8 October 1834 – 7 November 1896) was an English Liberal politician who sat in the House of Commons from 1865 to 1874.

== Life ==
Stone was the son of William Stone of Dulwich Hill and his wife Mary Platt daughter of Thomas Platt of Hampstead. He was educated at Harrow School and at Trinity College, Cambridge graduating BA as 30th Wrangler and 8th Classic in 1857 and MA in 1860. In 1859, he was a Fellow of Trinity College. He was a merchant and East India agent and a director of the London and County Banking Co. He lived at Godalming and was a J.P. for Surrey and Hampshire.

Stone married Melicent Helps daughter of Sir Arthur Helps in 1864.

At the 1865 general election Stone was elected as a Member of Parliament (MP) for Portsmouth. He was re-elected in 1868 held the seat until his defeat at the 1874 general election.

He was chairman of the Girl's Public Day School Company and gave evidence to the Royal Commission on Secondary Education in 1894, with Mary Gurney.

Stone died at the age of 62.

Parliament of the United Kingdom
Preceded by Francis Baring; Sir James Dalrymple-Horn-Elphinstone, Bt	Member of Parliament for Portsmouth; 1865 – 1874; With: Stephen Gaselee 1865–68; Sir James Dalrymple-Horn-Elphinstone, Bt 1868–80	Succeeded by Thomas Charles Bruce; Sir James Dalrymple-Horn-Elphinstone, Bt
