= Richard Spicer alias Newport =

English politician

Richard Spicer or Newport (died c. 1435), of Plymouth, Devon and Portsmouth, Hampshire was an English politician.

== Family ==
His sons, Richard and John, were also MPs.

== Career ==
He was a member (MP) of the parliament of England for Portsmouth in 1402.
