= Stephen Agulon =

English politician

Stephen Agulon (fl. 1384–1395) was an English politician. He sat as MP for Portsmouth in 1395.

He also served as bailiff of Portsmouth from Michaelmas 1384 till 1385.

He possibly had one son.
