= List of mayors of Portsmouth =

Lord Mayor of Portsmouth

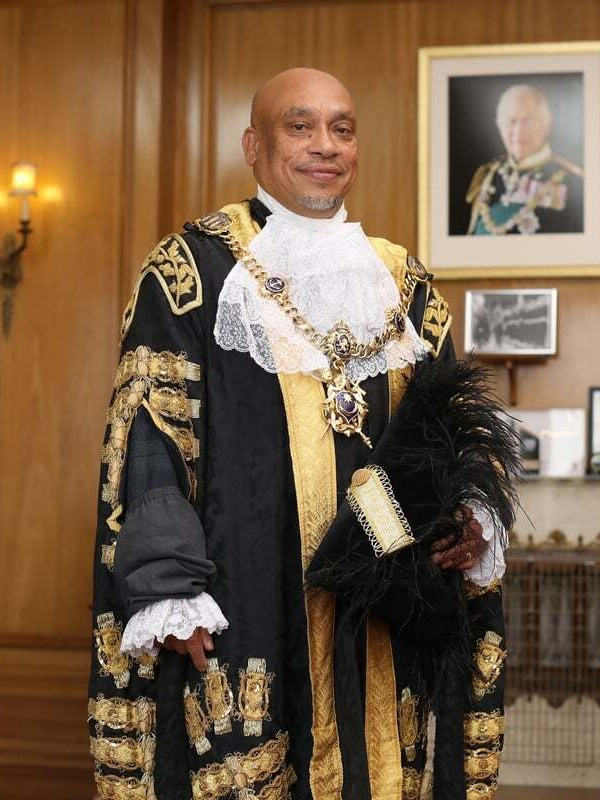
- Incumbent; Abdul Kadir since 19th May 2026
- Style: The Right Worshipful the Lord Mayor of Portsmouth
- Type: Ceremonial
- Member of: Portsmouth City Council
- Seat: The Guildhall, Portsmouth
- Appointer: Members of Portsmouth City Council
- Term length: 1 year
- Formation: Letters Patent, 10 July 1928
- First holder: Thomas Carpenter: Appointed 1531
- Deputy: Suzy Horton
- Salary: £9,461 p.a.
- Website: Lord Mayor of Portsmouth

This is a description of the role of The Lord Mayor of Portsmouth and a list of notable Mayors and the later Lord Mayors of the city of Portsmouth in the United Kingdom.

Portsmouth had elected a mayor annually since 1531. The city was awarded the dignity of a Lord Mayoralty by letters patent dated 10 July 1928. When the city became a non-metropolitan borough in 1974 the honour was confirmed by letters patent dated 1 April 1974.

== History ==
Portsmouth was granted Letters Patent in 1926, providing that Portsmouth would henceforth be a city and in 1928 further letters patent provided that the Chief Magistrate should cease to be called simply Mayor and would be raised to the dignity of Lord Mayor.

Before local government reorganisation in 1974 any citizen could be Lord Mayor, although in practice it was usually a member of the council. After 1974 it was a requirement that the Lord Mayor had to be a serving member of the elected council. The Lord Mayor nominates the Lady Mayoress or Consort.

== Symbols of Office ==
=== Coat of Arms ===
Portsmouth has borne its arms, comprising an azure shield bearing a gold star and crescent, for more than 700 years. The motto, 'Heaven's light, our guide', was registered in 1929. In 1970, the Portsmouth Museums Society sponsored a petition to The Earl Marshal for a grant of supporters, crest and badge to complete the city's full achievement.

The city was granted the rare privilege of bearing a maritime version echoing the Royal supporters - a sea lion and sea unicorn, reflecting Portsmouth's long association with the Crown. The unicorn wears a Naval Crown and the mighty Chain of Iron, which is a pictorial representation of the chain boom - from Tudor times, this was stretched from the Round Tower, Old Portsmouth, to Fort Blockhouse, Gosport, as a protection to Portsmouth harbour. The mural crown worn by the sea lion refers to the land defences, which surrounded Portsmouth from Elizabethan times until 1862.

Ownership of the original arms was confirmed at the Heraldic Visitations of 1622 and 1686. Various theories suggest how Portsmouth first acquired these historic arms. It was the two well-known local historians, H.T. Lilley and A.T. Everitt, who first suggested in 1921 that Portsmouth's seal was based on the arms of William de Longchamp. He was Lord Chancellor to Richard I at the time of the granting of the town's first definitive charter on 2 May 1194.

==== The Richard I connection ====
However, as William de Longchamp had also adopted a variation of the arms used by Richard I on his first Great Seal, there is no reason why Portsmouth should not similarly have adopted a variation of Richard's arm direct, as a compliment to the King for the favours he had shown the Town during his brief reign. Richard's first great seal showed on either side of his head a star with six wavy rays (known as an estoile) above a crescent moon.

On some specimens of his first Great Seal an eight-pointed star was used. It is not known for certain whether Richard adopted this device as a result of going on the Crusades to Palestine in 1191, or whether it was a punning reference to the star called Regulus in the constellation of Leo, which is commonly known a "Cor Leonis", or "Heart of the Lion" - a play on words on Richard's nickname.

The use of the city's arms is confined to the council. Only they can grant the use of the badge to organisations with strong links with the city. The badge comprises the city's ancient Arms on a roundel crossed by a sword and anchor to mark the city's naval and military connections.

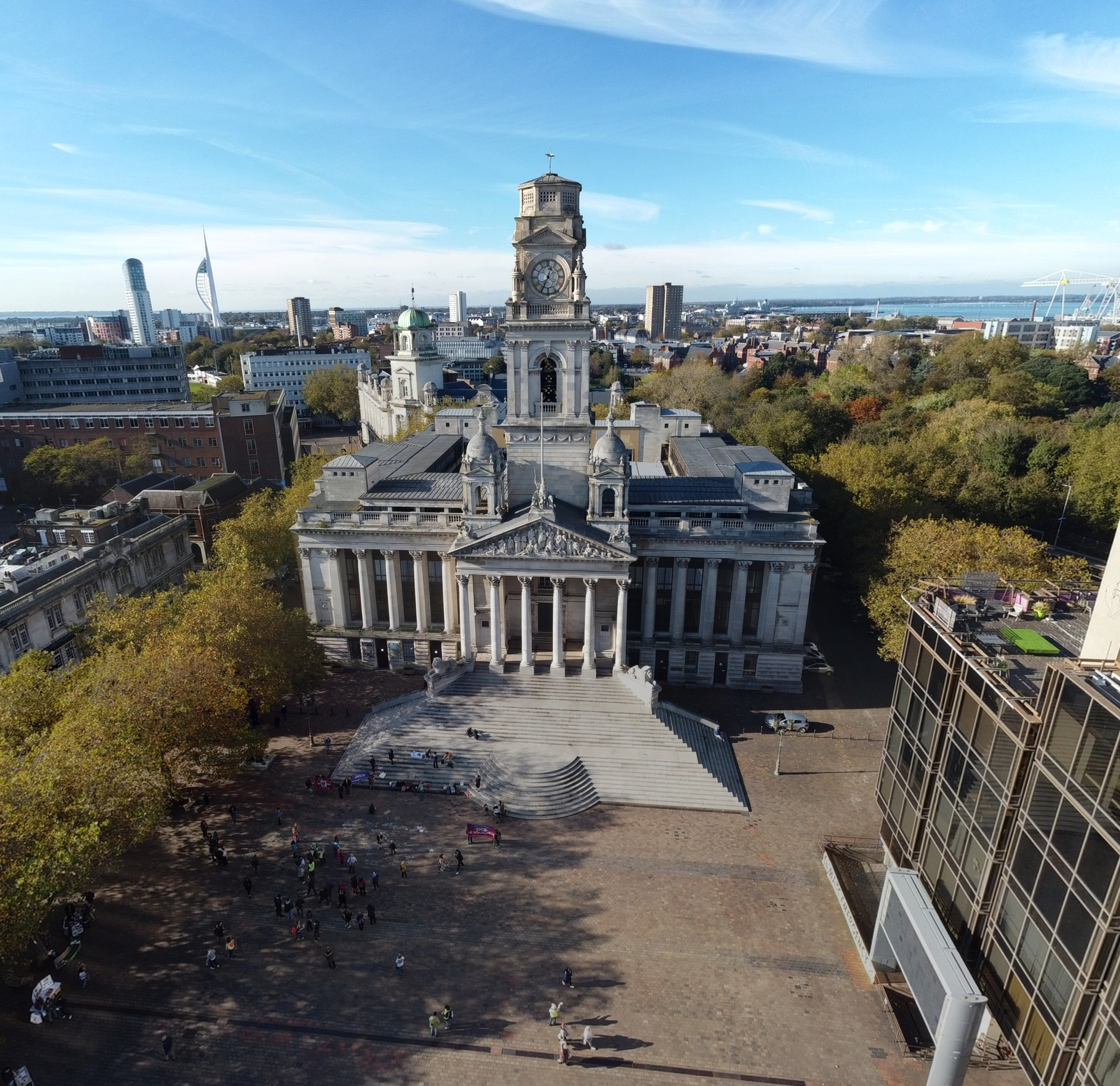
The seat of The Lord Mayor and The City Council, The Guildhall.

=== The Guildhall ===
The Lord Mayor’s official seat is The Guildhall, Guildhall Square, in which he has a suite of rooms, located on the second floor, which include the Lord Mayor's office and parlour, antechamber, Banqueting room and The Lady Mayoress' Parlour. The city’s royal charters, the three maces, gifts to the city and the civic silver collection are also on display there.

The Guildhall is also the place in which The Lord Mayor is elected, every year a 'Mayor making' ceremony takes places in the auditorium. The Lord Mayor is formally elected by Full Council and is presented with his robes and chains of office before being granted the Keys to the City, which they must present if the monarch visits the city. They are also presented with the Portsmouth Sword - a symbol of the interdependence between the city and the Royal Navy.

=== Mayoral record panels ===
In the Council Chamber of The Guildhall, designed by the architect E. Berry-Webber following the destruction of the building's original Victorian interior by incendiary bombs during WW2, There are ten mayoral record panels, grouped in twos - they carry the names of the Mayors and Lord Mayors of Portsmouth since the corporation's records of the annual election of the Mayor began in 1531. The panels include information such as their years in office and brief summaries of national and local events of consequence.

Following much careful research, artists F Angello del Cauchferta, MGLC (Spain), and Beryl Hardman, ARCA, of London, illuminated each panel with scenes, both momentous and whimsical, from the period it encompasses. Entries have continued to be made and illuminated for each successive Lord Mayor.

=== The Lord Mayor's chain and badge ===
The gold chain and badge are the outward signs of the office of the Lord Mayor. The chain is worn within the city when performing official civic functions, important ceremonial occasions and also as appropriate at other times, such as opening conferences, fetes and new businesses.

The chain may also be worn when paying visits to such places as schools, churches and the emergency services, at the Lord Mayor's discretion. The badge is only worn outside the city on official engagements and is worn according to protocol - permission is sought from the Mayor or Chairman of the Borough to be visited.

The chain comprises a clasp in the shape of the ancient Domus Dei, from which plain rectangular links (with the names of successive Mayors and Lord Mayors inscribed on them) pass on either side to shields engraved with the obverse and reverse of the corporate seal. The links then change their shape to a handsome bold curb; part plain and part engraved. On the next shields the maritime anchors stand in full relief and the centre shield bears the crest of Henry Ford, Mayor in 1859, when the chain was acquired.

From the chain hangs the badge, a massive pendant in rich scrollwork supporting a blue enamel shield with the star and crescent upon it, supported by the mace and sword of state . Engraved on the back of the badge is the legend:

"Purchased by subscription amongst the burgesses and presented to the Worshipful the Mayor of Corporation of the Borough during the Mayoralty of Henry Ford Esq., under a committee composed of G Cressweller Esq. (Chairman), Mr Alderman Orange, Mr LA Vandenburgh, Mr WO Marshall, Mr E M Frost, Mr H D Davey, Mr E M Wells, Mr Dudley, Mr G Rake, Mr W Treadgold, Mr G Long, Mr William D King (Hon Sec) Portsmouth, September 1859"

The diamond-studded crown over the enamelled scroll bears the words "Jubilee V 1887 R Year" and now surmounts the Mayor's crest in the centre of the chain, with the following inscription "Presented by A S Blake Esq., Mayor, 1885-86.

==== The Lady Mayoress or Consort's chain ====
This is a smaller, more slender replica of the Lord Mayor's chain. The badge bears the following inscription

"In commemoration of the 60th year of the reign of Queen Victoria, this Chain and Badge was purchased by members of the Council and presented to Mrs Couzens for the use of herself and her successors in the office of Mayoress/Consort, 1897"

This chain was worn for the first time on the occasion of the election of mayor by H Kimber, Mayoress, 1897-98.

=== Robes of office ===
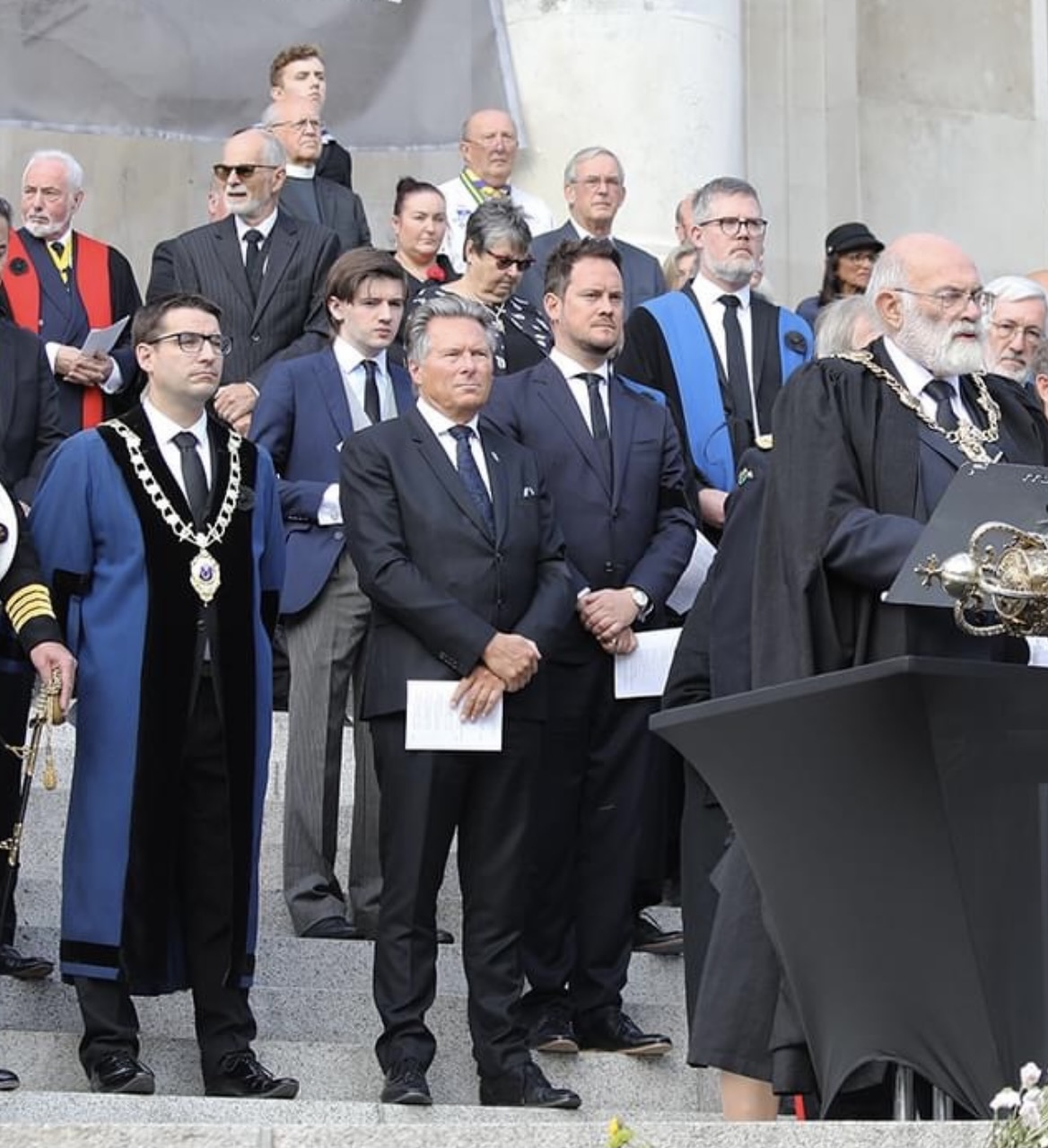
The robes of The Council on show at the city's memorial service for Elizabeth II in 2022. The red alderman's robe is at the back, The Deputy Lord Mayor's on the left, The mourning gown at the front and councillors robe behind the Lord Mayor.

The Lord Mayor has two sets of robes, the first worn for the most important civic occasions is a set made of black silk damask trimmed with heavy gold lace detailing and the city's coat of arms embroidered in gold on the back. It is nearly identical to the set worn by the Lord Chancellor. The second set of robes is scarlet with fur trimming, this is worn on less formal occasions, such as full council meetings. Both of these robes are worn with a lace jabot and cuffs with white cotton gloves and a feather plumed tricorne hat.

A plain black gown, similar to an academic gown is worn at times of national mourning, it was most recently worn in September 2022 by Lord Mayor Hugh Mason on the death of Queen Elizabeth II, having not been seen for 70 years.

The Deputy Lord Mayor also wears a robe, which he wears alongside his chain of office. This consists of a blue wool robe with black facings and two inch black velvet on the edge of the gown and sleeves, differing from that of a councillor. This is worn with a bicorne hat for men and tricorne for women on important occasions.

Councillors also wear robes, some of which date back to 1949. These are black wool with blue facing detailing and two inch velvet trimmings on the sleeves. Aldermanic robes are the same design but with red facings. Both of these robes are worn with a bicorne hat for men and tricorne for women, with past Lord Mayor's having gold braid on their hat as opposed to black.

=== The Lord Mayor's car, Mace Bearer and Duties ===
The City Council provides an allowance for The Lord Mayor to carry out their duties, as part of this a civic staff is employed, with a member of this staff serving as attendant, chauffeur and mace bearer. Although the car The Lord Mayor uses has varied over the years, having been at one time a Daimler and a Jaguar and presently a Skoda, the number plate has remained the same, 'BK 1'. This being the first number plate issued in the City of Portsmouth. Having their own vehicle allows The Lord Mayor to attend many community functions and engagements during their year of office. This is the primary and most visible part of their role but they have the important role of presiding at civic events and Full Council meetings. In addition to this they are an ex officio member of several organisations and boards, including The Lord Mayor of Portsmouth's Coronation Homes, named after the post.

=== The three maces ===
A mace was originally a heavy club used as an offensive weapon, but later became a staff of office symbolising authority, with the head often elaborately worked in precious metal or bejewelled.

The Great Mace is silver gilt, similar to several others which Charles II ordered to be made and presented to various corporations that had lost their regalia during the civil wars between his father and Parliament. The pattern of the shaft leaves little doubt that the Mace was made earlier than 1678 - it was probably made during the Commonwealth period and converted into a Royal Mace at the Restoration. This mace is placed on the clerk's table in the council chamber for every meeting to represent the authority of the sovereign, it is also carried in procession and placed on display during civic processions and events. During times of national mourning the mace is covered with a black cloth and inverted when carried.

John Corke, Mayor 1912-1915. Wearing the scarlet robe and touching The Great Mace

The two smaller maces used in the procession appear to date back to Tudor times. One is a small antique silver Mace with a cup shaded head and a slender stem. On one side of the head is the Tudor Rose crowned, and on the other side a Fleur-de-lis crowned, both repoussé and gilt. On the circular top of the head are the Arms of James I, somewhat defaced. The other small mace is of silver parcel gilt about the same size as the first but with a much stouter stem. On either side of the head is a star rudely engraved. The cresting or coronet at the top is composed of Fleur-de-lis and Lozenges alternately within which, on a raised boss, are the Arms of King Charles II.

== List of mayors of Portsmouth ==
Year	Name	Notes
1531	Thomas Carpenter	
1532	John Golde	
1533	John Golde	
1534	Thomas Younge	
1535	John Elton	
1536	John Golde	
1537	Thomas Carpenter	
1538	Thomas Carpenter	
1539	Henry Bickley	MP for Portsmouth, 1553
1544	Robert Lyonden	
1545	Stephen Barneham	
1546	Henry Bickley	MP for Portsmouth, 1553
1547	William Younge	
1550	John Elton	
1551	Henry Bickley	MP for Portsmouth, 1553
1552	Thomas Stubber	
1553	Francis Bodkyn	
1554	William Yong	
1555	Thomas Goodynough	
1556	John Elton	
1557	John Yong	
1558	Henry Slater	MP for Portsmouth, 1571
1559	John Trenayle	
1560	Francis Bodkyn	
1561	Thomas Stubber	
1562	Darbie Savell	
1563	John Holloway	
1564	John Whytingstall	
1565	John Whytingstall	
1566	Francis Robyns	
1567	Richard Jenyns	
1568	Nicholas Yeoman	
1570	Robert Carpenter	
1571	Darbie Savell	
1572	Thomas Stubber	
1573	Owen Tottye	
1574	Richard Jenens	
1575	Thomas Heynos	
1576	Richard Jervys	
1577	Richard Sedgewick	
1578	Thomas Thorney	
1579	Francis Bodkyn	
1580	Owen Totty	
1581	Richard Jennyns	
1582	John Highfield	
1583	Richard Sedgewick	
1584	Thomas Holmes	
1585	Thomas Thorney	
1586	Francis Elton	
1587	John Humfrey	
1588	Jehn Jennens	
1589	Richard Jarvis	
1590	Richard Leonard	
1591	Thomas Byston	
1592	John Turner	
1593	Owen Tottie	
1594	Thomas Playfoot	
1595	Mark James	
1596	Richard Elton	
1597	Peter Cooke	
1598	Owen Tottie	
1599	Owen Tottie/Totty	
1600	Richard Jenvey	
1601	Henry Jennens	
1602	Richard Elton	
1603	Mark James	
1604	Owen Jennens	
1605	Peter Cooke	
1606	William Winter	
1607	William Towerson	
1608	John Pares	
1609	John Lardner	
1610	Richard Jenvey	
1611	Richard Elton	
1612	Thomas Bonner	
1613	Robert Bo(u)ld	
1614	Owen Jennens	
1615	William Haberley	
1616	William Marshe	
1617	William Towerson	
1618	Thomas Tridles	
1619	David Beiston	
1620	John Pares	
1621	Roger Towerson	
1622	Henry Holt	
1623	Owen Jenens	
1624	Richard James	
1625	William Towerson	
1626	William Haberley	
1627	Henry Holt	
1628	Henry Holt	
1629	William Towerson	
1630	William Haberley	
1631	Richard James	
1632	Owen Jenens	
1633	Henry Wentworth	
1634	William Brooke	
1635	William Winter	
1636	Richard Jenens	
1637	Thomas Beeston	
1638	John Goodwine	
1639	Owen Jenens	
1640	Richard James	
1641	John Holt	
1642	Roger Granger	
1643	John Trigg	
1644	William Michell	
1645	Thomas Beeston	
1646	William Winter	
1647	Edward Deane	
1648	Richard Lardner	
1649	Richard Ridge	
1650	John Tunbrell	
1651	John Holt	
1652	Anthony Belbin	
1653	Roger Granger	
1654	Francis Holt	
1655	John Tawke	
1656	John Comfort	
1657	Hugh Salesbury	
1658	Josiah Child	
1659	John Tippetts	
1660	Richard Lardner	
1661	John Timbrell	
1662	Anthony Haberley	
1663	Henry Perin	
1664	St John Steventon	
1665	Benjamin Johnson	
1666	Samuel Williams	
1667	Hugh Salesbury	
1668	Grantham Wyan	
1669	Charles Chapman	
1669	Samuel Burmingham	
1670	Thomas Plover	
1671	Philip James	
1672	Nicholas Peirson	
1673	Nicholas Hedger	MP for Portsmouth, 1690
1674	Edward Archer	
1675	St John Steventon	
1676	Samuel Williams	
1677	Henry Beverley	
1678	John Moore	
1678	Robert Shales	
1679	Theophilus Curtis	
1680	John Grundy	
1681	Thomas Hancock	
1682	Nicholas Peirson	
1683	Isaac Betts	
1684	William Legg	
1684	Richard Ridge	
1685	Theophilus Curtis	
1686	Robert Shales	
1687	John Grundy	
1688	John Grundy	
1688	Thomas Hancock	
1689	Nicholas Hedger	MP for Portsmouth, 1690
1689	Thomas Brouncker	
1690	John White	
1691	Lewis Barton	
1692	John Blakley	
1693	Thomas Brouncker	
1694	George Everenden	
1695	George Deacon	
1696	John Mounsher	MP for Hastings, 1701
1697	George Everenden	
1697	John Thomas	
1698	Henry Seager	
1699	John Blakley	
1700	John Mounsher	MP for Hastings, 1701
1701	John Vining	
1702	William Brandon	
1703	George Deacon	
1704	John Vining	
1705	Edward Harman	
1706	Nathaniel Harford	
1707	John Vining	
1708	Edward Harman	
1709	Nathaniel Harford	
1709	Joseph Whitehorne	
1710	Henry Seager	
1710	Henry Maydman	
1711	Charles Bissell	
1712	William Smith	Founder of Portsmouth Grammar School
1713	William Smith	Founder of Portsmouth Grammar School
1714	Robert Reynolds	
1715	John Vining	
1716	Henry Belfield	
1717	Henry Stanyford	Master House Carpenter to the Ordinance and Justice History in Portsmouth: The Stanyford Family
1718	James Harmann	
1719	Thomas Blakey	
1720	Thomas Missing	
1721	Lewis Barton	
1722	John Vining	
1723	James Harmann	
1724	John White	
1725	Samuel Brady	
1726	Lewis Barton	
1727	Henry Stanyford	Elected for second term
1728	James Blakley	
1729	John Arnold	
1730	Robert Newnham	
1731	John White	
1732	John Mounsher	
1733	Samuel Brady	
1734	Henry Stanyford	Timber merchant. Died during office. History in Portsmouth: The Stanyford Family
1734	John White	
1735	Cornelius Colliss	
1736	William Rickman	Captain. Sheriff of Hampshire in 1746. Father of John Rickman Also mayor in 1742, 1748 & 1755
1737	Michael Atkins	
1738	John Vining	
1739	John White	
1740	Samuel Brady	
1741	Lewis Barton	
1742	William Rickman	
1743	Michael Atkins	
1744	Thomas Stanyford	Sergeant-at Law and son of former mayor, Henry Stanyford. History in Portsmouth: The Stanyford Family
1745	Edward Linzee	
1746	Samuel Chandler	
1747	John Carter	First time. Father of John (mayor 1779)
1748	William Rickman	
1749	Thomas Stanyford	Sergeant-at Law
1750	Thomas Missing	
1751	John Leeke	
1752	Thomas White	
1753	Edward Linzee	
1754	John Carter	Second time.
1755	William Rickman	
1756	Thomas Missing	
1757	Thomas White	
1758	Edward Linzee	
1759	John Carter	Third time.
1760	Thomas White	
1761	Edward Linzee	
1762	John Carter	Fourth time.
1763	Thomas White	
1764	Philip Varlo	
1765	John Carter	Fifth time.
1766	Edward Linzee	
1767	John Carter	Sixth time.
1768	Philip Varlo	
1769	John Carter	Seventh time.
1770	Philip Varlo	
1771	Edward Linzee	
1772	John Carter	First term.
1773	William Carter	
1774	Thomas White	
1774	Philip Varlo	
1775	Thomas Monday	
1776	Philip Varlo	
1777	Edward Linzee	
1778	Joseph Bissett	
1779	Edward Linzee	
1779	John Carter	Second time.
1779	John Godwin	
1780	Edward Linzee	
1781	John Godwin	
1782	John Carter	Third time.
1783	Richard Godman Temple	
1784	William Carter	
1785	John Godwin	
1786	John Carter	Fourth time.
1787	William Carter	
1788	John Godwin	
1789	John Carter	Fifth time.
1790	William Carter	
1791	Thomas White	
1792	John Godwin	
1793	John Carter	Sixth time.
1794	Thomas White	
1795	John Godwin	
1796	John Carter	Seventh time.
1797	Stephen Gaselee	
1798	Rev. George Cuthbert	
1799	William Goldson	
1800	John Carter	Eighth time.
1801	John Godwin	
1802	Stephen Gaselee	
1803	Rev. George Cuthbert	
1804	John Carter	Ninth time.
1805	William Goldson	
1806	John Adam Carter	
1807	John Godwin	
1808	Rev. George Cuthbert	
1809	Samuel Spicer	
1810	Joseph Smith	
1811	Edward Carter	First year.
1812	James Carter	
1813	Henry White	
1814	William Goldson	
1815	Samuel Spicer	
1816	Edward Carter	Second year.
1817	James Carter	
1818	Daniel Howard	First year.
1819	Sir Samuel Spicer	
1820	Edward Carter	Third year.
1821	James Carter	
1822	Daniel Howard	Second year.
1823	Sir Samuel Spicer	
1823	Edward Carter	Fourth year.
1824	James Carter	
1825	David Spicer	
1826	Daniel Howard	Third year.
1827	William John Cooper	First year.
1828	Edward Carter	Fifth year.
1829	David Spicer	
1830	Daniel Howard	Fourth year.
1831	James Carter	
1832	John Sutton Shugar	
10 January 1833	William John Cooper	Second year.
1833	Thomas Burbey	
1834	David Spicer	
1835	Unknown	
1836	Edward Carter	Sixth year.
1836	William John Cooper	Third year.
1837	Daniel Howard	Fifth year.
1838	Thomas Jackson	
1839	Sir John Wesley Williams	
1840	William Jones	
1841	Daniel Howard	Sixth year.
1842	James Hoskins	First year.
1843	Edward Casher	Two years.
1844	Edward Casher	Two years.
1845	James Hoskins	Second year.
1846	Benjamin Bramble	
1847	Thomas Ellis Owen	Architect
1848	George John Scale	
1849	Benjamin Bramble	Second, third and fourth years.
1850	Benjamin Bramble	Second, third and fourth years.
1851	Benjamin Bramble	Second, third and fourth years.
1852	George Cornelius Stigant	First and second year.
1853	George Cornelius Stigant	First and second year.
1854	Andrew Nance Jnr	
1855	George Cornelius Stigant	Third year.
1856	Charles Crassweller	
1857	Charles Edward Smithers	
1858	Henry Ford	Brother of Richard William Ford (mayor 1864)
1859	William Hawkins Garrington	
1860	Charles Bettesworth Hellard	
1861	William Humby	
1862	Thomas Ellis Owen	Died in office.
1862–1863	William Grant Chambers	
1864	Richard William Ford	Brother of Henry Ford (1858)
1865	Edward Martin Wells	
1866	Emanuel Emanuel	First Jewish mayor of Portsmouth.
1867	Robert Edmund Davies	
1868	Lieutenant-Colonel Edwin Galt	
1869	George Shepherd/Sheppard	
1870	John Baker	Two years.
1871	John Baker	Two years.
1872	Robert Edmund Davies	
1873	George Edward Kent	
1874	Robert Edmund Davies	
1875	William Pink	Two years.
1876	William Pink	Two years.
1877	William David King	Two years.
1878	William David King	Two years.
1879	Arthur Cudlipp	
1880	William Pink	Third year.
1881	Joseph George Whitcombe	
1882	William Pink	Fourth year.
1883	Richard Marvin	
1884	James Moody	
1885	Alfred Starling Blake	
1886	Sir William David King	Third year.
1887	Albert Addison	
1888	George Ellis	
1889	Sir William David King	Fourth year.
1890	Sir William Pink	Fifth year.
1891	Sir Thomas Scott Foster	Brother of mayor F. G. Foster.
1892	Robert Barnes	
1893	Abraham Leon Emanuel	One of two Jewish mayors of 19th-century Portsmouth.
1894	Thomas King	
1895	John James Young	
1896	George Edwin Couzens	
1897	Harry Kimber	
1898	Sir Thomas Scott Foster	Brother of mayor F. G. Foster.
1899	Sir Harold Rufus Pink	First year.
1900	A. L. Emanuel	
1901	Sir William Dupree, 1st Baronet	Two years
1902	Sir William Dupree, 1st Baronet	Two years
1903	J. E. Pink	
1904	George Edwin Couzens	
1905	Sir George Edwin Couzens	
1906	Charles Dye	
1907	F.G. Foster	Brother of mayor Thomas Scott Foster.
1908	James Baggs	
1909	Sir William Dupree, 1st Baronet	
1910	Sir Thomas Scott Foster	
1911	Sir Thomas Scott Foster	
1912	Sir John Henry Corke	Four years.
1913	Sir John Henry Corke	Four years.
1914	Sir John Henry Corke	Four years.
1915	Sir John Henry Corke	Four years.
1916	Harold Rufus Pink	Second and third year
1917	Harold Rufus Pink	Second and third year
1918	John Timpson	Two years.
1919	John Timpson	Two years.
1920	Sir J. Timpson	
1921	Albert E. Porter	
1922	F.G. Foster	
1923	George William Corbin	
1924	Frank J. Privett	Four years.
1925	Frank J. Privett	Four years.
1926	Frank J. Privett	Four years.
1927	Frank J. Privett	Four years.

== Lord Mayors of Portsmouth ==
Year	Name	Notes
1928	James Edward Smith	First Lord Mayor of Portsmouth. Served two consecutive years
1929	James Edward Smith	First Lord Mayor of Portsmouth. Served two consecutive years
1930	Walter Gleave	
1931	Ferdinand Green Foster	Alderman for St. Mary.
1932	William Albert Billing	Alderman for Fratton.
1933	Sir Harold Rufus Pink	Fourth year.
1934	Frank John Privett	JP
1935	William James Avens	
1936	Frederick Joseph Spickernell	Served two consecutive terms
1937	Frederick Joseph Spickernell	Served two consecutive terms
1938	Leonard Nicholson Blake	Alderman for either Fratton or St. Mary.
1939	Denis Leo Daley	Served five consecutive years
1940	Denis Leo Daley	Served five consecutive years
1941	Denis Leo Daley	Served five consecutive years
1942	Denis Leo Daley	Served five consecutive years
1943	Denis Leo Daley	Served five consecutive years
1944	Albert Edward Allaway	Served two consecutive years
1945	Albert Edward Allaway	Served two consecutive years
1946	Robert John Winnicott	
1947	Frank Miles	Served two consecutive years
1948	Frank Miles	Served two consecutive years
1949	John Privett	
1950	Sir Denis Leo Daley	Returned as longest serving Lord Mayor.
1951	Albert Johnson	Served two consecutive years
1952	Albert Johnson	Served two consecutive years
1953	Frank Miles	
1954	George Albert Day	Served two consecutive years
1955	George Albert Day	Served two consecutive years
1956	Arthur George Asquith-Leeson	Served two consecutive years
1957	Arthur George Asquith-Leeson	Served two consecutive years
1958	Alfred Lapthorn Blake	Solicitor
1959	Leonard John Evans	
1960	Gerald Joseph Horton	
1961	Ralph Bonner Pink	MP for Portsmouth South, 1966
1962	Eric Osment Bateson	
1963	Harry Sotnick	
1964	Joseph Albert Nye	
1965	Frank Lines	
1966	Clifford Alfred Worley	
1967	Denis Darling Connors	
1968	Frederick Alfred John Emery-Wallis	Went on to become leader of Hampshire County Council
1969	William John Evans	
1970	Jonathan Frederick Blair	
1971	Alfred Dudley Darby	
1972	Phyllis Loe	First female Lord Mayor
1973	John Patrick Newton Brogden	Councillor for Kingston
1974	Arthur George Dann	
1975	Eric Howard Taplin	
1976	Ian Goodwin Gibson	
1977	George H. Austin	
1978	Richard Eric Sotnick	
1979	Roland Charles Taylor	
1980	Mary Winifred Sutcliffe	Councillor for Havelock.
1981	Frank Harold Ernest Sorrell	
1982	John William Clarence Fisher	
1983	Leslie Albert Kitchen	
1984	John Scott Marshall	
1985	Fred Anthony Warner	
1986	Marie Seaman	
1987	James George "Jim" Lodge	
1988	Kenneth William Hale	
1989	Gladys Irene Howard	>
1990	Syd Rapson	
1991	Brian Read	
1992	James Patey	
1993	Alex Bentley	
1994	Alan Burnett	Doctor.
1995	Malcolm Chewter	
1996	Mark Hancock	
1997	Tony Golds	
1998	Pam Webb	
1999	David Horne	
2000	Barry Maine	
2001	Elaine Baker	Served two consecutive years
2002	Elaine Baker	Served two consecutive years
2003	Tom Blair	
2004	Jason Fazackarley	
2005	Robin Sparshatt	
2006	Fred Charlton	
2007	Mike Blake	
2008	Richard Jensen	
2009	Terry Hall	
2010	Paula Riches	
2011	Cheryl Buggy	
2012	Frank Jonas	
2013	Lynne Stagg	
2014	Steven Wylie	
2015	Frank Jonas	
2016	David Fuller	
2017	Ken Ellcome	
2018	Lee Mason	
2019	David Fuller	
2020	Rob Wood	First ethnic minority Lord Mayor.
2021	Frank Jonas	Three-time holder.
2022	Hugh Mason	
2023	Tom Coles	
2024	Jason Fazackarley	
2025	Gerald Vernon-Jackson	
2026	Abdul Kadir	First Bangladeshi Lord Mayor
