= Springsure Hospital Museum =

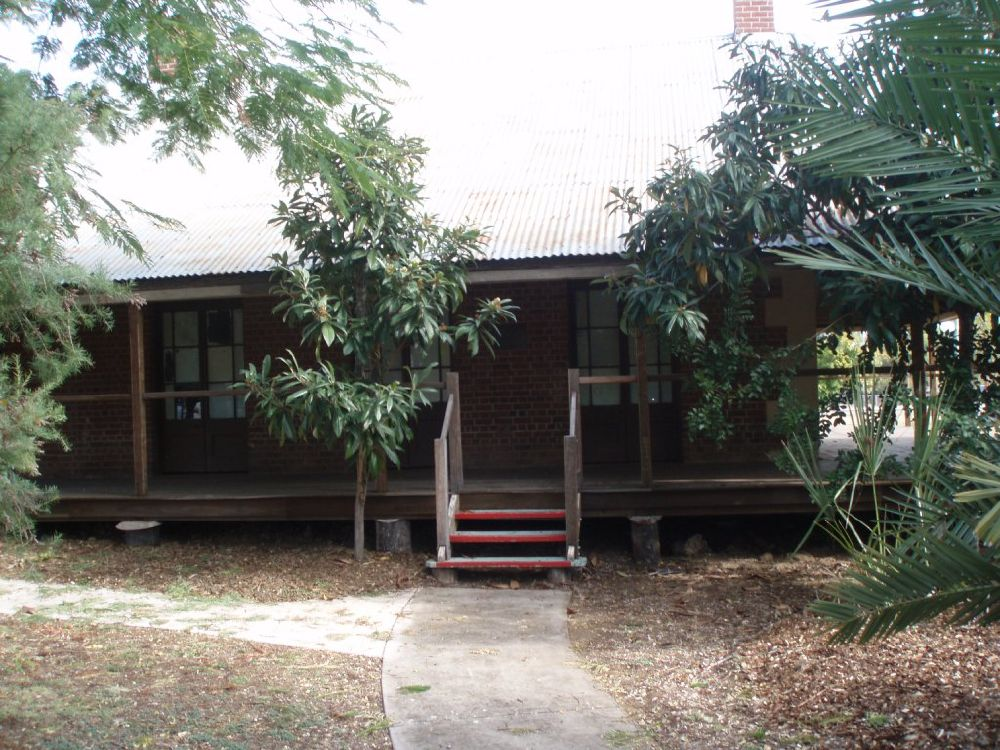
- Springsure Hospital Museum from north, 2009

- Location within Queensland Location within Australia
- 24.1194°S 148.0844°E
- Location: 13 Woodbine Street, Springsure, Central Highlands Region, Queensland, Australia

History
- Design period: 1840s–1860s (mid-19th century)
- Built: 1868–1879

Queensland Heritage Register
- Official name: Springsure Hospital Museum, Springsure Hospital
- Type: state heritage (built)
- Designated: 21 October 1992
- Reference no.: 600025
- Significant period: 1860s–1870s (fabric); 1860s–1930s (historical)
- Significant components: out building/s, hospital

Springsure Hospital Museum is a heritage-listed former public hospital and now a museum at 13 Woodbine Street, Springsure, Central Highlands Region, Queensland, Australia. It was built from 1868 to 1879. It is also known as Springsure Hospital. It was added to the Queensland Heritage Register on 21 October 1992.

== History ==
The Springsure Hospital was constructed in c. 1868, as a response to the needs of the local community.

In 1844 Ludwig Leichhardt traversed an area to the east of what is now Springsure, naming the Expedition Range, Albinia Downs and Comet Creek as he went. Some two years later Major Thomas Mitchell entered the area and named further features in the classical style (such as Salvator Rosa) while the following year Leichhardt attempted to explore the area again but was forced back by floodwaters.

While the Leichhardt Pastoral District was officially opened up to settlement on 10 January 1854, William Landsborough subsequently in 1858 explored the Comet River through to the area that is now Springsure.

In 1863 surveyor Charles Frederick Gregory laid out the plan for Springsure, the town reserve taking in an area of 50 square miles centred on the springs of Springsure Creek. As pastoral enterprises proved successful, more and more settlers streamed into the area and by the time the 1864 census was taken the Springsure Police District recorded a total of 720 persons, 619 of them male, with only 34 of the 720 people actually residing in the township of Springsure. By the late 1860s it became apparent that a hospital was needed in the district.

The Springsure Hospital was erected c. 1868 as a response to needs of the local community who set up a committee of volunteers to manage the project. The hospital was to be run by governors, each governor to subscribe a minimum of one pound per year towards the running of the hospital. From those subscribers, a committee responsible for the affairs of the hospital was to be elected, the committee to be composed of a president, a secretary and other officers. On 7 October 1868, William Henry Hinton, Louis Meyer and George Pultney Malcolm Murray were appointed trustees. Patients able to pay for their treatment would be required to do so whereas those unable to afford treatment would receive the medical care required regardless.

In 1868, the hospital was opened. Its feature characteristics were those of the pavilion plan, a plan first designed and implemented in France in the mid 19th century. The Lariboisiere Hospital had opened in Paris in 1854. Following promotion of the pavilion plan by Florence Nightingale who recognised its advantages for the recovery of soldiers suffering from the effects of the Crimean War, almost all hospitals constructed in Queensland in the 1860–1880 period were built to incorporate the features of the pavilion plan.

The principal design characteristics of the pavilion plan were to provide good ventilation and sanitation for the benefit and recovery of patients. The Springsure Hospital was no exception and today is the oldest surviving hospital constructed on the pavilion plan in Queensland and is the first hospital constructed in inland Queensland.

The hospital was erected as a small cottage type hospital that incorporated the pavilion plan ward with other facilities including an office, surgery, dispensary and a store within the one main building. At its inception the hospital comprised a brick building with a shingle roof with its main section housing a ward that accommodated six beds. To promote cross ventilation, French doors were located along the northern and southern sides of the main ward, with a verandah encircling three sides of the ward. Each of the beds was positioned between each set of French doors to ensure that the patients were afforded adequate ventilation.

Initially a husband and wife team, Thomas and Ellen Cahill were appointed as wardsman and matron and continued in these positions until the mid 1870s.

In 1871 the census for the Springsure Police District recorded 1098 people, 370 of whom were residing in the township of Springsure. In that year the doctor treated a total of 48 cases and the government "helped out" with a contribution of £300. Accordingly in the 1870s the hospital was expanded to meet the growing needs of the community with an extra ward added in 1879 to bring the number of beds to seventeen. The Queensland Board of Health requested that the Hospital Board appoint a health officer at its own expense but the Board refused stating that a health officer was unnecessary as Springsure was a healthy and well-drained district.

When banks crashed in the 1890s the Hospital Board had its money locked up and as a result was forced to arrange overdraft. Despite this by 1897 the Hospital Board was in a position to employ its first trained nurse, Miss Alice Kemp and in 1900 as a response to a Queensland Government requirement that Boards take positive action Dr Neilson was appointed health officer at a cost of £25. Despite the hospital having been in operation since the late 1860s it was not until 1902 that the deeds to the land were received.

The 1884 Health Act made local governments responsible for the treatment of infectious disease, mainly because of the miasma theory of disease transmission, which blamed infectious diseases on noxious vapours arising from poor sanitation and bad drainage - both local government responsibilities. This also gave Councils responsibility for inoculations such as the program organised by the Bauhinia Shire Council in response to the 1919 flu epidemic. Councils were also expected to provide hospital wards for the treatment of infectious diseases. In 1920 the Bauhinia Shire Council provided £200 to the hospital to make improvements to the isolation ward.

Expansion continued apace with the erection of separate staff quarters in 1914. Improvements to the district's health services continued throughout the 1920s with establishment of an ambulance brigade and with Miss Hammond opening Westray as maternity home in 1921. As part of a statewide response by the government to the Maternity Act 1922 and as existing facilities were becoming less than adequate, in 1924 the Queensland Government constructed a maternity ward at the Springsure Hospital. In 1925 a new complex housing wards and a kitchen was constructed adjacent to the 1868 brick building. Although the Queensland Government was providing some health facilities for the Springsure community, in 1923 local authorities were expected to meet some of the shortfall between income and expenditure for their local hospitals through precepts, such as the £100 provided in 1924 by the Bauhinia Shire Council. The Council continued to take responsibility for inoculation campaigns, providing diphtheria inoculations for the community free of charge in 1931. Local government responsibility for hospital finances only ceased after the Hospitals Act of 1945.

When the Depression affected the financial status of the hospital to the point where it was likely to close a public meeting was called to make arrangements for a further input of voluntary contributions. Strong hostility towards the possibility that the hospital could come under the control of the state in the late 1930s instigated the Bauhinia Shire Council to pledge a £400 per annum to ensure that the hospital continued to be maintained under the voluntary system.

When a new hospital was constructed in 1938, the former hospital building was used for recreation and as a dance hall for the nurses. During the 1970s new staff quarters were erected and in the 1980s, when the original brick building was identified as being surplus to the needs of the Hospital Board, the site was subdivided. A reserve was created comprising the 1868 building and the adjacent 19th century timber annex. The Bauhinia Shire Council was appointed trustee.

== Springsure Hospital Museum ==
Restoration work was undertaken in 1988 and on 19 August 1989, the Honourable Mike Ahern MLA, Premier and Treasurer of Queensland opened the Springsure Hospital Museum. The Museum is furnished to resemble an early rural hospital; it has a collection of medical equipment, photographs and other records.

In 2004–2005 the Springsure Hospital Museum was closed to the general public for safety reasons.

For Anzac Day in 2016, the museum hosted an exhibition about World War I including the letters written from the war front by the four Fryer brothers (William, Charles, Henry and John) from Springsure. The brothers were the sons of Charles and Rosina Fryer, who served as wardsman and matron at the Springsure Hospital. Charles was killed in 1917. One of the brothers who returned from the war, John (Jack) Fryer, resumed his studies at the University of Queensland but died of tuberculous in 1922. His fellow students donated £10 to the University of Queensland to establish a collection of Australian literature in Fryer's memory. In 1927, this collection grew into the Fryer Memorial Library, now an extensive archive of published and unpublished material relating to Australian literature, Aboriginal and Torres Strait Islander studies, and the history, art and architecture of Queensland.

2018, the museum is open to the public on Tuesday and Thursday 9 to 12 noon. However, people wishing to visit outside these hours may obtain a key from the Central Highlands Regional Council office in Eclipse Street.

== Description ==
The former Springsure Hospital, now the Springsure Hospital Museum, is situated at 13 Woodbine Street, Springsure, located adjacent to the present Springsure Hospital. The building demonstrates the principal characteristics of a Queensland hospital in that it stands on elevated ground away from the town centre. The Victorian Georgian style building is substantially intact and consists of a single storey brick building with an attached timber annex.

The main brick building constructed c. 1868 comprises two sections. The western section is the former six-bed ward designed on the pavilion plan. Offices and a storeroom are located within the eastern section and a verandah extends the full lengths of the main elevation, the western elevation and part of the northern elevation. The building is constructed of locally manufactured bricks in English Bond style with stonework forming the foundations beneath floor level. The stonework of the foundations has been used to level the floor of the main building, as there is a fall in slope to the west; the eastern section of the building is at ground level, the western section is on timber stumps.

The main room that is the former ward area demonstrates the principles of the pavilion design with its promotion of sanitation and cross-ventilation. The ward is designed to accommodate six beds of single depth against the walls each bed would have had a French door between it and the next bed. There are three French doors, each with a window above on each of the southern and northern elevations, each of the doors opening to the verandah. The building has three fireplaces, a feature that is rare for Central Queensland. Two of the fireplaces are in the ward, the third in the former office.

The eastern section of the main building comprises two rooms on the south and two small rooms with an open passage between on the northern side. A modern toilet is located on the northern verandah. Quoins are a feature of the main building on the western side and sash windows feature flat arches and keystones. Gothic style scalloped timber bargeboards decorate the steeply pitched roof of the main building; the roofline over the verandahs is a less steep pitch, the entire roof being of corrugated iron overlying well preserved wooden shingles.

The annex is situated immediately to the west of the main building and is of two rooms with a verandah along the eastern elevation with a decorative spandrel along its western edge. The timber-framed building weatherboard clad and roofed with corrugated iron features external framing on the southern and eastern elevation.

The grounds in front of the complex are landscaped with native shrub and trees.

== Heritage listing ==
Springsure Hospital Museum was listed on the Queensland Heritage Register on 21 October 1992 having satisfied the following criteria.

The place is important in demonstrating the evolution or pattern of Queensland's history.

Erected c. 1868, the former Springsure Hospital is important in demonstrating the development of health facilities in 19th century Queensland. The hospital was erected as a local initiative and managed by a voluntary committee. The building is significant in that it illustrates the rapidity with which the principles of the pavilion plan were adopted in Queensland. The first hospital constructed to the pavilion plan had only opened in Paris in 1854. The plan had only become widely accepted in Britain in the mid 1860s following the efforts of Florence Nightingale and others to promote the advantages that the plan incorporated for the sick.

The place demonstrates rare, uncommon or endangered aspects of Queensland's cultural heritage.

The former Springsure Hospital is significant as a rare surviving example of a hospital complex erected in the 19th century. Of more than 90 public hospitals erected in Queensland in the 19th century, only ten buildings are known to survive. Within this group, the former Springsure Hospital complex is the only example of a small cottage type hospital that combined a small pavilion ward with other facilities in the one main building. Not only is the former Springsure Hospital the first inland hospital constructed in Queensland it is also Queensland's oldest surviving hospital designed on the pavilion plan. While an extensive number of pavilion plan hospitals were constructed, few have survived development in the 20th and 21st centuries.

The place is important in demonstrating the principal characteristics of a particular class of cultural places.

With its verandah encircling three sides of the main ward and with French doors to the northern and southern sides of the building, creating cross ventilation, the former Springsure Hospital is a good example of the pavilion plan design which aimed to promote cross ventilation and sanitation for the patients.

The place has a strong or special association with a particular community or cultural group for social, cultural or spiritual reasons.

The former Springsure Hospital, now the Springsure Hospital Museum, is valued by the community for the role it played in the establishment of health services and in the provision of medical training facilities. The site is important to the people of Springsure and surrounding area for its role as the principal site of public health care, the birth, life and death of the people of the area and in providing recreational facilities following its decommissioning as a hospital. Such facilities were valued not only for their functional role in caring for the sick, but also as symbols of progress and as evidence of civilising forces at work.

The former Springsure Hospital is valued by the community as one of the earliest surviving buildings in the district.
