= William Balchief =

English politician

William Balchief (fl. 1393–1423) was an English politician. He sat as MP for Portsmouth in 1399, 1411, May 1413, November 1414, 1419, 1420 and December 1421.
