= John Fryer (physician, died 1672) =

John Fryer (died 1672), was an English physician. Excluded from the College of Physicians by his Catholic faith, he was one of those trying to set up a breakaway "College of Chemical Physicians" in 1665.

== Career ==
Fryer was a grandson of John Fryer (d. 1563), and the eldest son of Thomas Fryer (d. 1623), both of whom were fellows of the College of Physicians. He studied his profession at Padua, where he graduated M.D. 6 April 1610, and was admitted a candidate of the College of Physicians 25 June 1612. He lived in Little Britain, London, in part of the house where his father "did dwell". By birth a strict Catholic, he was on 29 March 1626 returned to the parliamentary commissioners by the college as "an avowed or suspected papist". "This", observes Dr. Munk, "was probably the reason he was not admitted a fellow, as it was without doubt the cause of his brother, Thomas Fryer, M.D., having been refused admission as a candidate". After remaining a candidate for more than half a century, he was, in December 1664, when honorary fellows were first created, placed at the head of the list. On 5 Aug. 1628 he was admitted a member of Gray's Inn, but did not proceed to the bar.

== Death and inheritance ==
He died at his house in Little Britain, 12 Nov. 1672, at the advanced age of ninety-six, and was buried on 19 Nov. "in the vault of St. Botolph's Church without Aldersgate, London, where his mother and eldest sister, Elizabeth Peacocke, lye buried". Fryer, for his unfilial and unbrotherly conduct, had been disinherited by his father, though the latter, by will dated 2 Dec. 1617, and proved 10 May 1623, left him £50 in token of forgiveness. He denounced, however, his son's "many great impieties to his parents, and especially towards his tender, careful, and mercifull mother … too horrible and shamefull to repeate", and desired the world to know that he had "brought his parents, against all rites and against nature, and especially me, his father, before the greatest magistrates, to our discredites, as may appeare by letters sent from the highest, which at length they, having fully ripped upp all matters, although mutch against my will, turned utterly to his utter discredit".
