= Henry Slater (MP) =

16th-century English politician

Henry Slater (died c. 1590) of Portsmouth, Hampshire, was an English politician.

== Family ==
Slater died without any children to inherit from him. His next of kin was a Henry Atkinson.

== Career ==
He was a member (MP) of the parliament of England for Portsmouth in 1571. He was Mayor of Portsmouth in 1558–9.

Parliament of England
Preceded by William Wynter; Thomas Smith	Member of Parliament for Portsmouth; 1571; With: Lawrence Blundestone	Succeeded by Henry Radclyffe; Robert Colshill
