= John atte Mede =

English politician

John atte Mede (fl. 1388–1389) was an English politician. He sat as MP for Portsmouth in February 1388.

He also served as bailiff of Portsmouth from Michaelmas 1388 till 1389.
