= John Henry Corke =

Sir John Henry Corke as Mayor of Portsmouth

Alderman Sir John Henry Corke (12 February 1850 – 3 January 1927) was an English building contractor and four-time Mayor of Portsmouth (1912 to 1916).

Corke was born at 20 Cross Street, West Cowes on the Isle of Wight. He married Susannah Matilda Lobb (1845–1918) on 9 August 1868 in Portsmouth when he was 18 years old; over the next 20 years they had nine children. In 1881, he was a 'Plasterer employing five men' at Cowes and by the same year was a Freemason in the Carnarvon Lodge No 804 in Havant. By 1890 Corke was a Councillor for the St Bartholomew ward in Portsmouth, a position he was to hold until his death in 1927. His business partner was Edwin Young (1878–1936), the father of Sir Arthur Young, Commissioner of Police of the City of London from 1950 to 1971 and who Corke had helped to gain his first position with the police in 1924. In 1899, Corke and Young built the Pearl Buildings (now called Charter House) on Commercial Road in Portsmouth for Pearl Assurance to the design of architect Charles William Bevis. In 1900, Corke was contracted by Frank Matcham to build the New Theatre Royal in Portsmouth. The 1911 Census lists him as a retired builder.

By 1912, Councillor Corke was Mayor of Portsmouth and while still in that office in August 1914 he was appointed as Chairman of the Portsmouth Citizens Patriotic Recruiting Committee. This committee was formed to encourage the men of Portsmouth who were not employed in essential war work to join up in Portsmouth's Own Hampshire Regiment battalion. As a result of the work of the Portsmouth Citizens Patriotic Recruiting Committee the city of Portsmouth and its surrounding areas of Gosport, Havant, Cosham and Petersfield among others raised two battalions - the 14th and 15th (Portsmouth) Battalions the Hampshire Regiment. These and other similar Pals battalions formed part of Kitchener’s New Army and went on to see action on the Western Front during World War I including during the Battle of the Somme. Corke was made a Chevalier of the Legion of Honour by French President Raymond Poincaré in 1913 and was Knighted by King George V in 1916 for his war work during World War I. Corke was a Justice of the Peace and an Alderman in Portsmouth.

Corke died in 1927 aged 76 and was buried with his wife Lady Susannah Corke in Highland Road Cemetery in Portsmouth.
