= John Carter (mayor of Portsmouth) =

English merchant and mayor

Sir John Carter (before 20 December 1741 – 18 May 1808), a Unitarian merchant, was on nine occasions Mayor of Portsmouth, Hampshire, England, the chief maritime port for the Royal Navy. He was High Sheriff of Hampshire in 1784. He played a key role in defusing the crisis caused by the 1797 naval mutiny at Spithead. Members of his family were long influential in Portsmouth politics.

== Biography ==
The eldest son of Susanna Pike and John Carter (born 1715), a successful and respected merchant, the young John Carter was baptised in the High Street Presbyterian (Unitarian) Chapel in Portsmouth. His parents, rational dissenters, refused to belong to the Church of England and, like both of his grandfathers, were members of this chapel. In 1763, at 22, John Carter was elected an alderman of the (then) corporation of the borough of Portsmouth and, at the same time, started to act as a magistrate. He was mayor for a few months in 1769, but, as he was a Whig, the Tories soon turned him out of office. He was knighted on 22 June 1773, whilst again occupying the office.

His son John (1788–1838), a barrister and Member of Parliament for Portsmouth, changed his name to John Bonham-Carter to inherit property from a cousin, and his legitimate male-line descendants thus became the Bonham-Carter family.
