= William David King =

Politician (b. 1829, d. 1902)

Sir William David King (1829 – 22 October 1902) was an English Liberal politician, auctioneer and four times Mayor of Portsmouth 1877–1878, 1878–1879, 1886–1887 and 1889–1890.

== Biography ==
King was born in Portsmouth 1829, the son of builder Joseph King, and was educated locally. He began his business at Midhurst, but in 1857 moved back to Portsmouth where he was established as an auctioneer linked with another future mayor of the city, Thomas King (not related). The firm of King & King, Auctioneers and Estate Agents, then traded from 130 Queen Street, Portsea.

King was elected to the city council in 1872, and was unanimously elected Mayor of Portsmouth in 1877–78, then re-elected for 1878–79. He was elected Alderman of the city in 1878. During his years as mayor he opened Victoria Park in May 1878, the first public park in the city, and the following year a hospital for the mentally ill. Ten years later, the city councillors wanted an experienced mayor for the year marking Queen Victoria′s golden jubilee, and he was re-elected for the year 1886–87. Portsmouth hosted the Review of the Fleet to mark the jubilee, and King was one of the ten English Mayors to be knighted in honour of the Jubilee. He received the honour at Osborne House on 2 August 1887, the first Portsmouth mayor to be so honoured for forty years.

King had been involved with the planning and building of a new town hall for the city during his years as mayor, and when it was finally finished in 1890, the council again elected him mayor for the year of the opening. The Portsmouth Town Hall was officially opened by the Prince and Princess of Wales (later King Edward VII and Queen Alexandra) in August 1890, with King as the host.

After stepping down from the mayoralty four the fourth time, King still continued as a prominent person in the city, with several directorships. He was appointed a deputy lieutenant of Hampshire.

King died at his residence Stratford Lodge, Southsea, on 22 October 1902.

== Family ==
King married, in 1853, Matilda Atkey, of Chichester. Lady King died in 1894.
