= Henry Knollys (Portsmouth MP) =

16th-century English politician

Henry Knollys of Downton, Hampshire, was a parliamentarian in England.

He was a Member of Parliament for St Ives in 1547.
