= John Serle (died c. 1456) =

Member of the Parliament of England

John Serle (died c. 1456), of Southampton, was an English Member of Parliament for Portsmouth in 1419.
