= John Fryer Thomas Keane =

British explorer

John Fryer Thomas Keane (4 October 1854 – 1 September 1937), popularly known as Jack Keane, was a Yorkshire clergyman's son who went to sea at the age of twelve. In 1877, still only 23 but having had his share of adventures, he visited Mecca and Medina, one of the few Europeans ever to have done so at that time.

== Early life ==
Jack Keane was born in the port town of Whitby, the son of an Irish parson, The Reverend Dr. William Keane. He was the eldest of five. His father died in 1873, when Keane was only 19 years old.

In his book On Blue-water, Keane tells us that he attended "a large and well-known public school". It is not known which school, although it is known that it was not Charterhouse, which both his father and younger brother Robert attended. He was soon expelled for breaking bounds; an event which seems to have determined him to "be off on my own account".

Keane claims to have run away to sea, but the evidence suggests that at the age of twelve he was put onto a collier brig by his father, to cool his temper and curb his bad behaviour. Upon his return he was given into the hands of a private tutor, an elderly parson in a remote part of the East Riding of Yorkshire. This had little effect on the young Keane, who soon took up with local poachers and huntsmen.

Keane's whereabouts throughout his early life are not entirely known, but in 1868, at the age of fourteen, he was living with wealthy relatives in Madras.

== Sea voyages ==
Following his brief stint on the collier brig, Keane's next trip to sea was at the age of 18 as a "premium apprentice" on a barque travelling between India and England. He gained his 2nd Mate's certificate.

In the years to come, Keane served on a whaler in the South Seas and Arctic, voyaged to the Arctic, Black Sea and China. He spent time in England in the Royal Naval Reserve and journeyed to Demerara in British Guyana where he worked on a sugar plantation for six months. There were also various trading voyages around the North Sea and several voyages to Bengal, via the Cape of Good Hope.

== Mecca ==
In late summer, 1877, Keane travelled to Alexandria by Steamer, and from there to Jeddah. In Jeddah he was able to render some small service to an Indian Emir, who permitted him to join his party who were making pilgrimage to Mecca.

Keane could speak Hindustani, but only rudimentary Arabic. He passed himself off in Mecca as a pilgrim from Bombay or, when this would not have passed muster, as a resident of a country called "North". He appears to have mastered Islamic ritual and prayer by copying what he saw; although he claims to have made earlier preparation for this adventure by closely observing the various Muslim crews with whom he previously served. When he made errors he claimed to be a recent convert to Islam, which seems to have generated admiration and assistance rather than suspicion.

== Islam ==
Was Keane a Muslim? For western ears, he seems to want to give the impression that it is all a great adventure and he is "pretending"; but he makes many admiring remarks about Islam and Islamic culture that seem to show another side. In particular, it appears that he made Islamic prayer when quite alone and not overseen, suggesting that his conversion was sincere in his own mind at that time.

== Later life ==
On his return to England, Keane published two books about his visit to the Hijaz. These were Six Months in Meccah (sic) and My Journey to Medinah.

== Life in Australia ==
According to his obituary in "The Times" from 1879 to 1883 he was a journalist in London, was sent to Indo China 1884-5 and visited America 1887 and 1890. By 1890 he had arrived in Australia. He was a member of the first Central Australia Exploration Expedition led by Alan A. Davidson which explored and prospected the Murchison Range, an area to the north and east of Alice Springs. F. J. Gillen who helped him obtain the Davidson position notes that after Keane left the expedition, he was engaged at Wire Creek Bore near Oodnadatta from where he wrote highly colourful articles about his experiences on the Davidson expedition for "The Port Augusta Dispatch" becoming editor of that newspaper for a short time. The articles titled" Four months in the Territory" appeared from 18 November 1898 to 13 January 1899. Throughout his life Keane always appeared to be short of money, a fact Gillen noted in his letter to Baldwin but he explained that once he received money he was most scrupulous about repaying his debts. By 1903 Keane was in Queensland employed at a saw mill in Mosman. He also claimed he worked as a sugarcane cane cutter to ascertain the ability of Europeans to perform hard manual labour in the Tropics. He appears to have had landholdings in the Mareeba (Carbeen) and Atherton areas (Yungarra) and by 1934 he was living in Mareeba. In his entry in "Who was Who" he claimed to have invented a form of fence wiring for the Queensland Government and noted his later life was spent residing on and improving his land to establish ownership and in agricultural experiment and criminal investigation, rod fishing and horse training. He died of senile decay 1937 aged 82 at Eventide Home for the Aged Charters Towers and is buried in the Lynd Cemetery in an unmarked grave Section 3 plot 322 grave number 8868.

== General references ==
- T(sic) F Keane, Six Months in Meccah: An Account of the Mohammedan Pilgrimage to Meccah, Tinsley Brothers, 1881.
- John F Keane, My Journey to Medinah: Describing a Pilgrimage to Medinah, Tinsley Brothers, 1881.
- J F Keane, On Blue-Water. Some Narratives of Sport and Adventure in the Modern Merchant Service., 1883.
- John F Keane, Three Years of a Wanderer's Life, Ward & Downey, 1887.
- John Keane, Six Months in the Hijaz: Journeys to Makkah and Madinah 1877–1878, Introduction by William Facey, Barzan, 2006, ISBN 0-9549701-1-X.
  (Includes complete facsimile editions of Six Months in Meccah and My Journey to Medinah)
- The Times 23 November 1937
