= James Dalrymple-Horn-Elphinstone =

British naval officer and politician

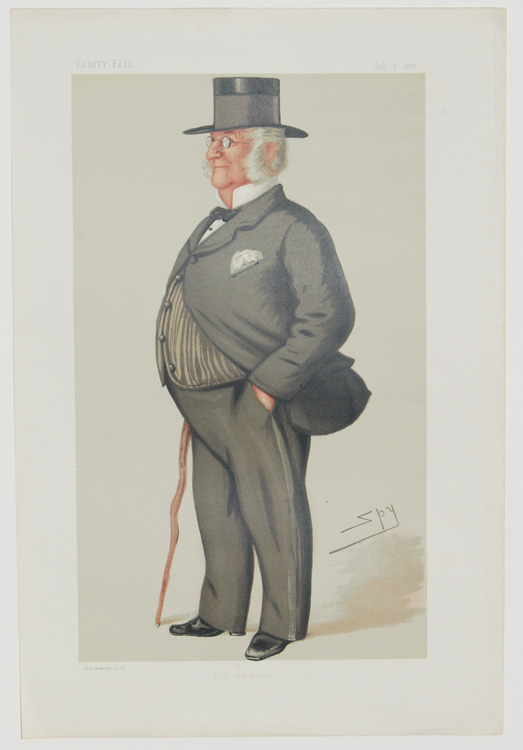
"The Admiral". Caricature by Spy published in Vanity Fair in 1878

Commander Sir James Dalrymple-Horn-Elphinstone, 2nd Baronet (20 November 1805 – 26 December 1886) was a British naval officer and Conservative politician who sat in the House of Commons in two periods between 1857 and 1880.

Dalrymple-Horn-Elphinstone was the son of Sir Robert Dalrymple-Home-Elphinstone, 1st Baronet and his wife Graeme Hepburn daughter of Colonel Hepburn, of Keith. He was educated at the Musselburgh Grammar School. He served as an officer in the Bombay Marine and Indian Navy for many years, retiring as commander in 1834. In 1848, he inherited the baronetcy on the death of his father. He was a J.P. and Deputy Lieutenant for Aberdeenshire.

Dalrymple-Horn-Elphinstone stood for parliament unsuccessfully at Greenock in 1852. He was elected Member of Parliament for Portsmouth in 1857 and held the seat until 1865 when he was defeated. He stood unsuccessfully at Aberdeenshire in 1866. At the 1868 general election he was re-elected for Portsmouth and held the seat until 1880.

He died in 1886 at the age of 81.

== Family ==
Dalrymple-Horn-Elphinstone married Mary Heron Maxwell, daughter of Lieutenant-general Sir John Heron-Maxwell, 4th Baronet, in April 1836.

His younger brother Charles Elphinstone-Dalrymple (sic) FSA(Scot) (1817-1891) was a noted antiquarian, geneaologist and expert on topography. He was a member of the Spalding Club.

Parliament of the United Kingdom
Preceded by Viscount Monck; Francis Baring	Member of Parliament for Portsmouth; 1857–1865; With: Francis Baring	Succeeded by Stephen Gaselee; William Henry Stone
Preceded by Stephen Gaselee; William Henry Stone	Member of Parliament for Portsmouth; 1868–1880; With: William Henry Stone 1865–74; Thomas Charles Bruce 1874–85	Succeeded by Sir Henry Drummond-Wolff; Thomas Charles Bruce
Baronetage of the United Kingdom
Preceded by Robert Dalrymple-Horn-Elphinstone	Baronet (of Horn and Logie Elphinstone); 1848–1886	Succeeded by Robert Dalrymple-Horn-Elphinston
