= Richard Abraham (14th-century politician) =

Member of the Parliament of England

- Occupation: Politician
- Known for: MP for Portsmouth

Richard Abraham was an English politician who was MP for Portsmouth in 1372, January 1377, and February 1383. History of Parliament Online claims that he was a relation of Henry Abraham.
