= Thomas Charles Bruce =

British barrister and politician

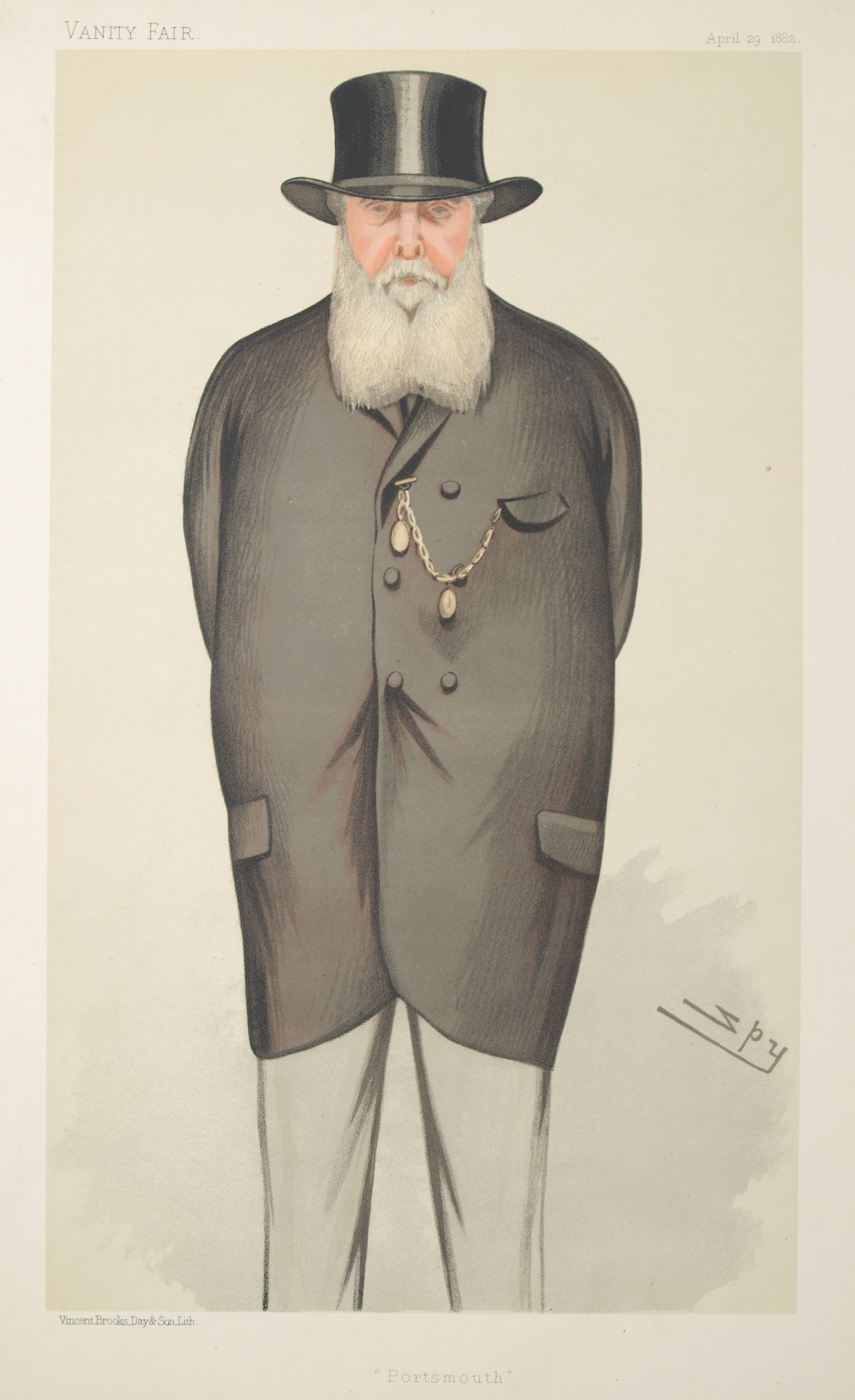
Caricature by Spy published in Vanity Fair in 1882.

Hon. Thomas Charles Bruce (15 February 1825 – 23 November 1890) was a Scottish barrister and a Conservative politician who sat in the House of Commons from 1874 to 1885.

== Early life and education ==
Bruce was born in Dunfermline, Fife, the youngest son of Thomas Bruce, 7th Earl of Elgin, and his second wife, Elizabeth Oswald, daughter of James Townsend Oswald MP of Dunnikier, Fife. He was educated at Jesus College, Cambridge and graduated B.A. and 24th Wrangler in 1850.

== Career ==
Bruce became a Fellow of Jesus College and was called to the Bar at the Inner Temple in 1854. In 1860, he was appointed Captain-Commandant of the 32nd Middlesex Rifle Volunteers.

At the 1859 general election Bruce stood unsuccessfully for Parliament in Portsmouth. He stood again at the 1874 general election, and won the seat, holding it until his defeat at the 1885 general election.

He was chairman of the Highland Railway from 1885 to 1890.

== Marriage and issue ==
Bruce married Sarah Caroline Thornhill, daughter of Sir Thomas Thornhill, 1st Baronet of Riddlesworth Hall, Norfolk, in 1863. They had four children:

- Charles Thomas Bruce (21 February 1865 – 23 October 1915), married first in 1897 Edith Mary Parker (died 1912), daughter of Samuel Sandbach Parker of Aigburth; he married secondly in 1914 Gwendolen Mary Spier, daughter of Robert Thomas Napier Speir
- Robert Arthur Bruce (3 April 1875 – 16 August 1896), died in an accident at Balmacaan House
- Elizabeth Marjorie Bruce (23 January 1867 – 29 April 1929), married Col. Algernon George Arnold Durand, son of Sir Henry Marion Durand
- Augusta Mary Bruce (9 June 1871 – 20 December 1949), died unmarried

Thomas Bruce died in 1890 after a period of failing health at his home, Invererne House, Forres, Moray.

In 1896, his second son, Robert, died aged 21 in unusual circumstances in Glen Urquhart, the Scottish Highlands. He had been attending a house party with his cousin James E. B. Baillie at Balmacaan, the seat of the Earls of Seafield. The house was rented in the summers by the American industrialist Bradley Martin and his wife. On Saturday night, 15 August 1896, Robert left the other gentlemen in the smoking room, complaining of being tired, and was not seen again that evening. He was found dead early the next morning on the staircase, still in evening dress, with a crushed skull. He was known to have fainting spells; he may have fainted and fallen over the balustrade of the upper staircase, a distance of more than 30 feet, though none of the servants heard him fall.

Parliament of the United Kingdom
Preceded by William Henry Stone; James Dalrymple-Horn-Elphinstone	Member of Parliament for Portsmouth; 1874 – 1885; With: James Dalrymple-Horn-Elphinstone 1874–1880; Henry Drummond Wolff 1880–1885	Succeeded by William Crossman; Philip Vanderbyl
