= Robert Abraham (MP) =

15th-century English politician

- Born: 1410
- Died: 1470 (aged 59–60)
- Occupation: politician

Robert Abraham (1410–1470) was a Member of Parliament for Portsmouth.

== Life ==
Parliamentary historian J.C. Wedgwood has suggested he was the son of an earlier MP for the same constituency, Henry Abraham.

He was elected member to attend the parliaments of 1433 and 1449–1450. He last appears on official records when, in 1467, he acted as pledge for another MP for the same constituency, Henry Uvedale.
