= Richard Abraham (15th-century politician) =

English politician

Richard Abraham was an English politician who was MP for Portsmouth in 1437. History of Parliament Online claims that he may have been a son of Henry Abraham.
