= Stephen Gaselee (serjeant-at-law) =

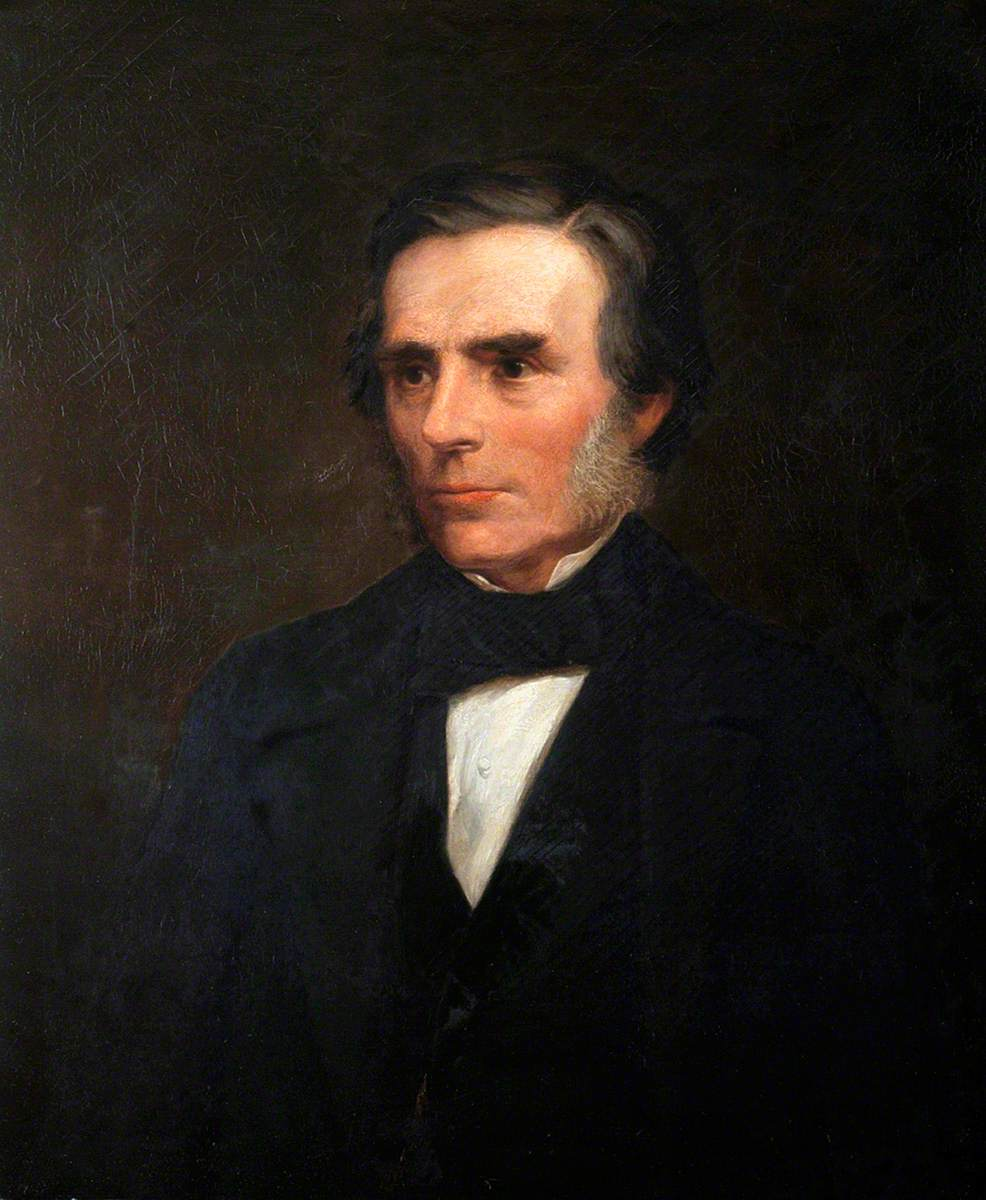
Portrait of Stephen Gaselee, attributed to Richard Poate (c.1811-1878)

Stephen Gaselee MP (1807 – 20 October 1883) was a serjeant-at-law.

== Life ==
Gaselee, eldest son of Sir Stephen Gaselee, was born at 77 Upper Guildford Street, Russell Square, London, on 1 September 1807, and educated at Winchester School. He matriculated from Balliol College, Oxford, on 4 June 1824; graduated second class in classics 1828, when he took his B.A. degree; and proceeded M.A. in 1832. He was called to the bar at the Inner Temple 16 June 1832, and practised on the home circuit.

On 2 November 1840 he became a serjeant-at-law, and at the time of his decease was the oldest surviving serjeant. He unsuccessfully contested the borough of Portsmouth in the Liberal interest at by-election on 14 March 1855. Ten years later, at the 1865 general election, he was elected as Member of Parliament (MP) for that borough, but lost his seat at the general election in 1868.

For many years he was a director of the London and South-Western Railway, was a magistrate for the county of Middlesex, sometimes presided as assistant-judge at the Middlesex sessions, and was treasurer of Serjeants' Inn, in succession to Serjeant James Manning, in 1866.

He died at 2 Cambridge Square, Hyde Park, London, 20 October 1883 and was buried at Paddington Old Cemetery, Willesden Lane, Kilburn, London.

== Family ==
His wife, whom he married at Marylebone on 21 July 1841, was Alicia Mary, eldest daughter of Sir John Tremayne Rodd, K.C.B. She was born 7 January 1814, and died at Bournemouth 11 November 1886.

== Notes ==
Parliament of the United Kingdom
Preceded by Francis Baring; Sir James Dalrymple-Horn-Elphinstone	Member of Parliament for Portsmouth; 1865–1868; With: William Henry Stone	Succeeded by William Henry Stone; Sir James Dalrymple-Horn-Elphinstone
