= John Denis Fryer =

Australian soldier and university student

John Denis (Jack) Fryer (1895–1923) was a soldier and a student of the University of Queensland in Brisbane, Queensland, Australia. His death resulted in the establishment of the Fryer Library at the University.

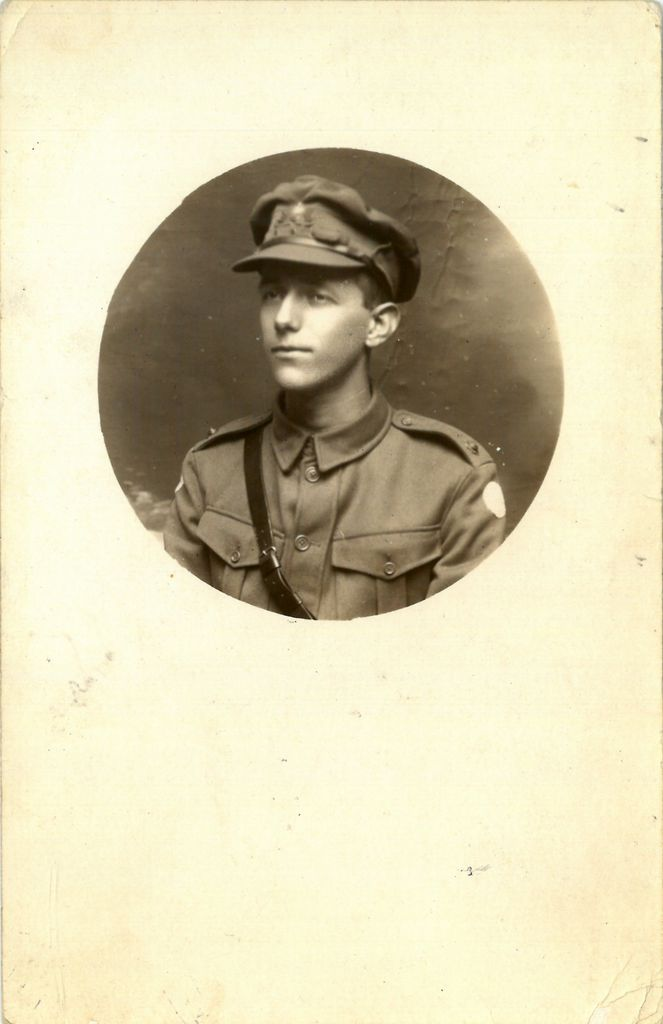
Portrait of Lieutenant John Denis Fryer, England, circa 1917

== Early life ==
John Denis Fryer was born on 11 September 1895 in Springsure, Central Queensland, the son of Charles George Fryer and his wife Rosina (née Richards). Jack Fryer attended Rockhampton Grammar School and went on to win a scholarship to The University of Queensland (UQ) in 1915, aged 19.

== University and Military life ==
Soon after starting his first term at the University of Queensland, Fryer volunteered for military service in the Australian Imperial Force (AIF) in World War I. He was commissioned in 1916 and served in France and Belgium in 1917. In August 1918 he was badly wounded in a German attack. Fryer returned home in July 1919 and started university again in March 1920, undertaking study towards a Classic Honours degree with commitment and enthusiasm. A popular and active figure on campus, Fryer was also editor of the student magazine, Galmahra, Vice-President of the Dramatic Society and representative rugby player.

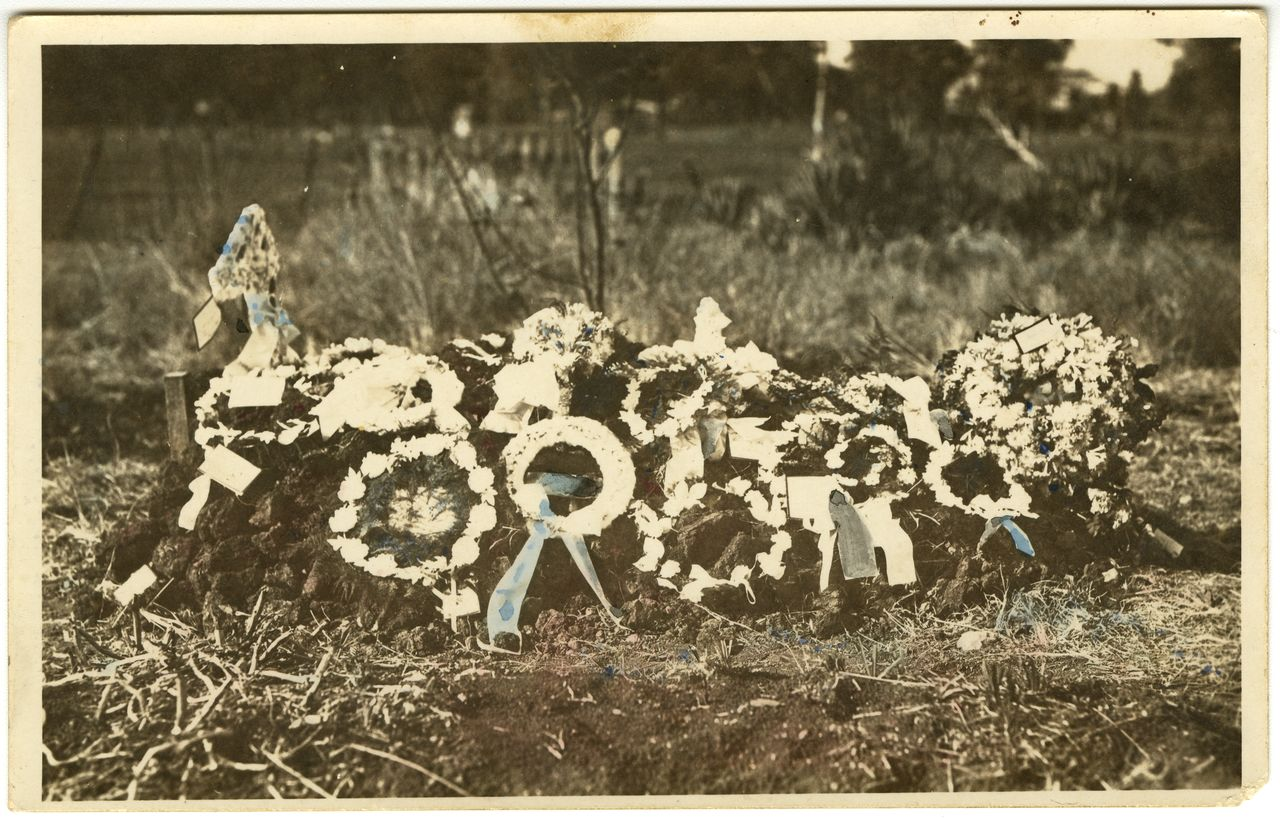
Jack Fryer's grave, Springsure Cemetery, February 1923

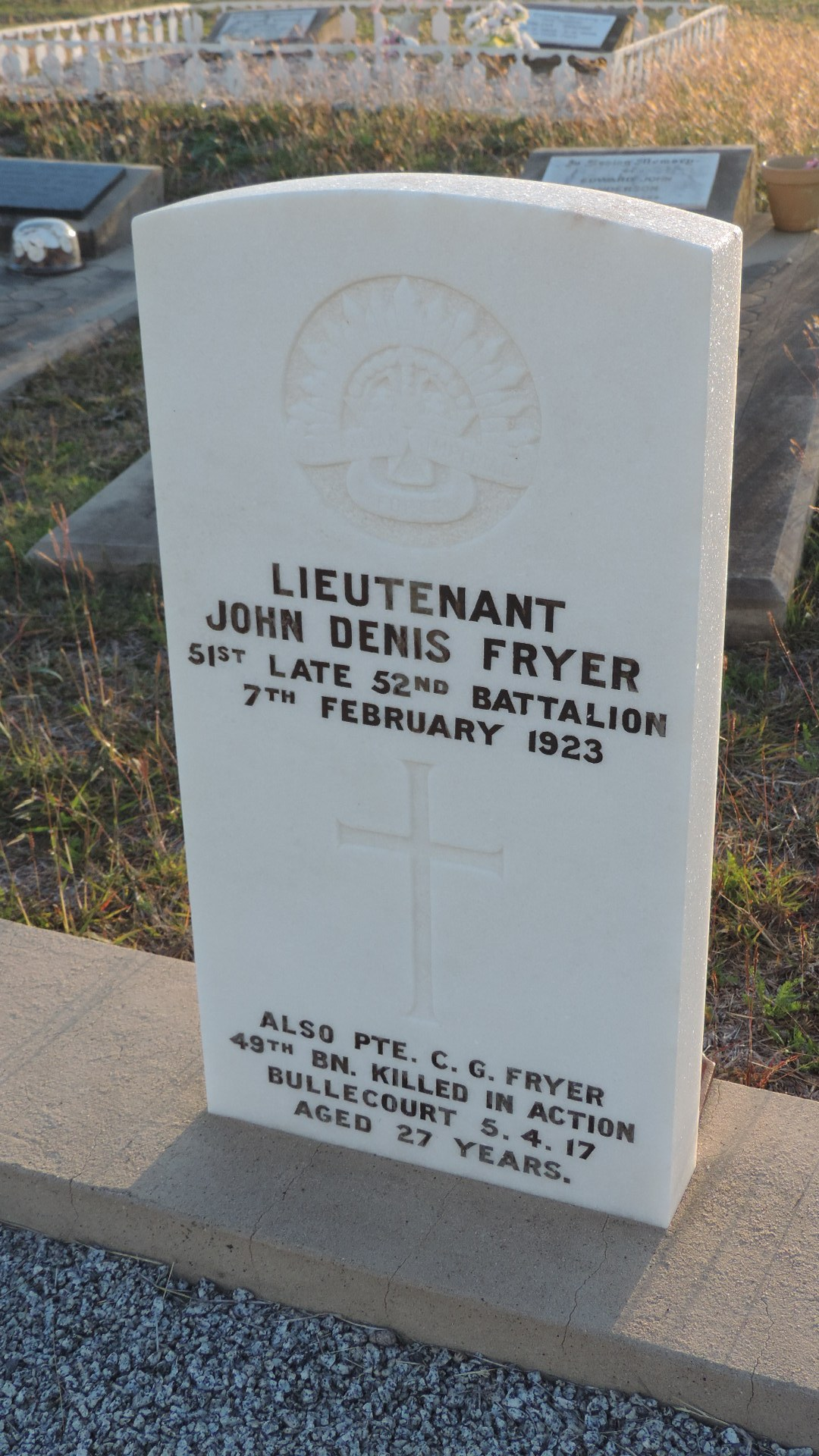
Jack Fryer's headstone, Springsure Cemetery, 2016

However, by mid 1922, he had developed tuberculous peritonitis. Too sick to sit for his final honours examinations, Fryer returned home to Springsure and died on 7 February 1923. He was buried in Springsure Cemetery.

The University senate awarded him the BA degree on 15 December 1922.

== Fryer's Legacy ==
As a memorial to their former member and vice-president, members of the University Dramatic Society donated £10 to establish a collection of works in Australian literature. With this collection as its foundation, the J.D. Fryer Memorial Library of Australian Literature was established in 1927.

The John Denis Fryer Collection

The John Denis Fryer Collection features items from Fryer's life, which reveal a loving son and brother as well as a devoted student and soldier. Items include photographs of Fryer with his family and from his student days at UQ, letters and cards sent home to Springsure from the battlefields of France, military maps of Amiens and St Quentin as well as military medals. The obituaries in the collection, written following Fryer's death, show the high regard in which he was held. Although his life was cut short, his legacy continues in the research and cultural collections of the J.D. Fryer Memorial Library (The Fryer Library). A selection of Fryer’s photographs and correspondence is also available online.

J. D. Fryer: Student and soldier

On Remembrance Day (11 November) 2015 as part of the commemoration of the centenary of the First World War, the University of Queensland launched the "J D Fryer: student and soldier" exhibition. The Queensland Museum organised an exhibition of the four Fryer brothers (William, Charles, Henry and Jack) who served in the First World War. It was launched at the Springsure Hospital Museum on Anzac Day (25 April) 2016 and was on display until 16 May 2016 at the Bauhinia Bicentennial Art Gallery in Springsure.
