= Stephen Gaselee (judge) =

British judge

Sir Stephen Gaselee (1762 – 26 March 1839) was a British judge, justice of the Court of Common Pleas.

He was the son of Stephen Gaselee, an eminent surgeon at Portsmouth, where he was born in 1762. He was admitted a student at Gray's Inn on 29 January 1781, but was not called to the Bar until 20 November 1793.

He had the advantage of being a pupil of Sir Vicary Gibbs, under whose instruction he became a skilful special pleader. He joined the western circuit, and was so much respected as a careful and well-informed junior, that when, after twenty-six years' practice, he was made a king's counsel in Hilary term 1819, his professional income was probably diminished.

Though he was not orator enough to commence practice as a leader, his deserved reputation for legal knowledge soon recommended him for a judge's place. On the resignation of Sir John Richardson, he was selected on 1 July 1824 as a Justice of the Common Pleas, became a serjeant-at-law on 5 July 1824, and was knighted at Carlton House on 27 April in the following year.

He sat in the Court of Common Pleas for nearly thirteen years, with the character of a painstaking and upright judge. He was a vice-president and an active member of the Royal Humane Society, and is said to have been the original of the irascible judge represented by Dickens in the trial of Bardell v. Pickwick, under the name of Justice Stareleigh.

He married Henrietta, daughter of James Harris of the East India Company's service, in 1802 at Ruislip. They had several children, including MP Stephen Gaselee (1807 - 1883).

He resigned his judgeship at the end of Hilary term 1837, and after two years' retirement died at 13 Montague Place, Russell Square, London, on 26 March 1839. He was buried at the Foundling Hospital Chapel, beside his wife Henrietta (d.1838) and two daughters Henrietta (1804 - 1840) and Emma (1814 - 1841).
