= John Fryer (physician, died 1563) =

Member of the Parliament of England

John Fryer (died 1563) was an English physician, humanist and early reformer. He was a Member of the Parliament of England for Portsmouth in 1545.

== Life ==
Fryer, born at Balsham, Cambridgeshire, was educated at Eton College and went to King's College, Cambridge, in 1517. He graduated B.A. in 1521 and M.A. in 1525. On 5 November 1525 he was incorporated at Oxford, being one of three masters of arts who had been preferred to Cardinal College; all Lutherans, they were obliged to leave.

He was imprisoned for heresy in the Savoy Hospital. By 1528 he was again a prisoner, this time in the Fleet Prison. On 16 September 1528 he addressed from prison an elegant Latin letter to Cardinal Wolsey.

Fryer's scholarship and personal qualities gained him the friendship of many eminent men, especially that of Edward Foxe, then Provost of King's College. By Foxe's assistance he was able to study medicine at the University of Padua, where he took the degree of M.D. in 1535. It is probable that he was incorporated on this degree at Cambridge. In December 1535 he attended Foxe at the Diet of Smalcalde in Saxony. The following year he returned home, and ultimately settled in London, residing in Bishopsgate within the parish of St Martin Outwich.

He was admitted a fellow of the College of Physicians in 1536, was censor in 1541, 1553, 1554, 1555, and 1559, elect in 1547, consiliarius in 1548 and 1555 to 1560, and president in 1549 and 1550.

On 24 June 1560 Fryer was committed to the Compter; he was liberated on the following day. In 1561 he was imprisoned in the Tower of London, not for Lutheranism but for Catholicism, 'wherein he was educated' (cf. Cal. State Papers, Dom. Ser. Addenda, 1547–65, p. 510). There in an examination of his servant, Thomas How, organ-maker, taken before Sir William Chester, lord mayor of London, 23 April 1561. It relates to the visit of his master to Dr. Martyn at Buntingford, Hertfordshire, and states that neither he nor his master to his knowledge had received the communion since Queen Elizabeth's accession. Fryer was liberated from prison in the beginning of August 1563, but died of the plague on 21 October, and was buried at St. Martin Outwich. His nuncupative will is attested by a curate of St Martin's.

== Family ==
His wife, Ursula, and several of his children also lost their lives by the pestilence. In her will, proved 28 December 1563, Mrs. Fryer, after desiring burial with her husband, names as her children three sons, Thomas, Jarmyn, and Reinolde, and two daughters, Mathe and Lucie.
