= Henry Abraham (MP) =

Member of the Parliament of England

Henry Abraham was an English politician who was MP for Portsmouth in 1410, 1415, May 1421, and 1422 and tax collector at Hampshire in May 1416. History of Parliament Online claims that two Portsmouth MPs, Robert Abraham and Richard Abraham, may have been his sons.
