= Portsmouth =

City in Hampshire, England

- City & unitary authority area
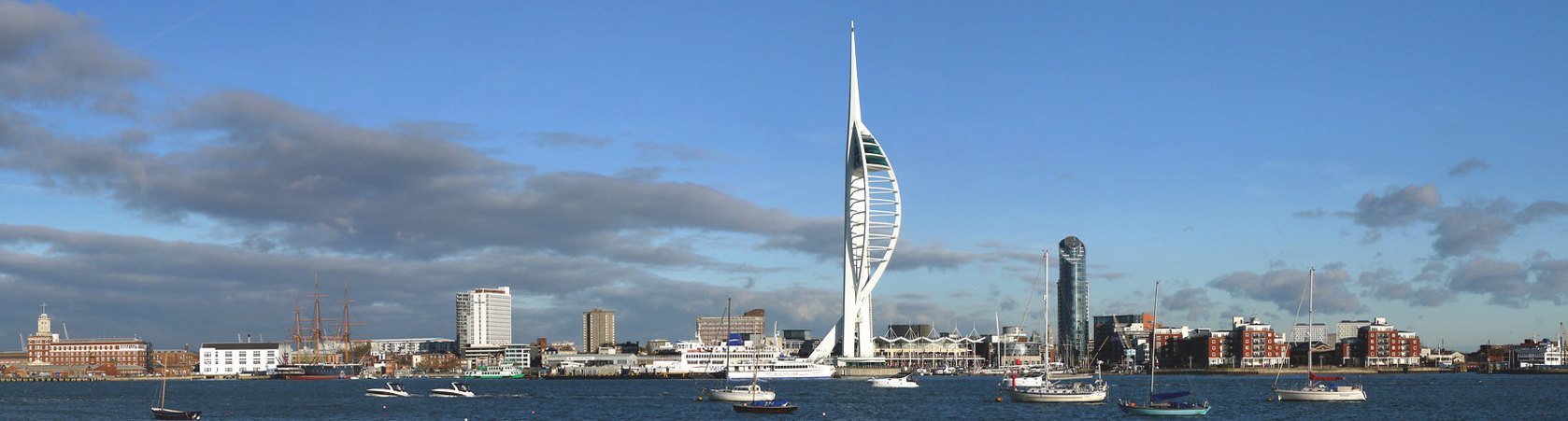
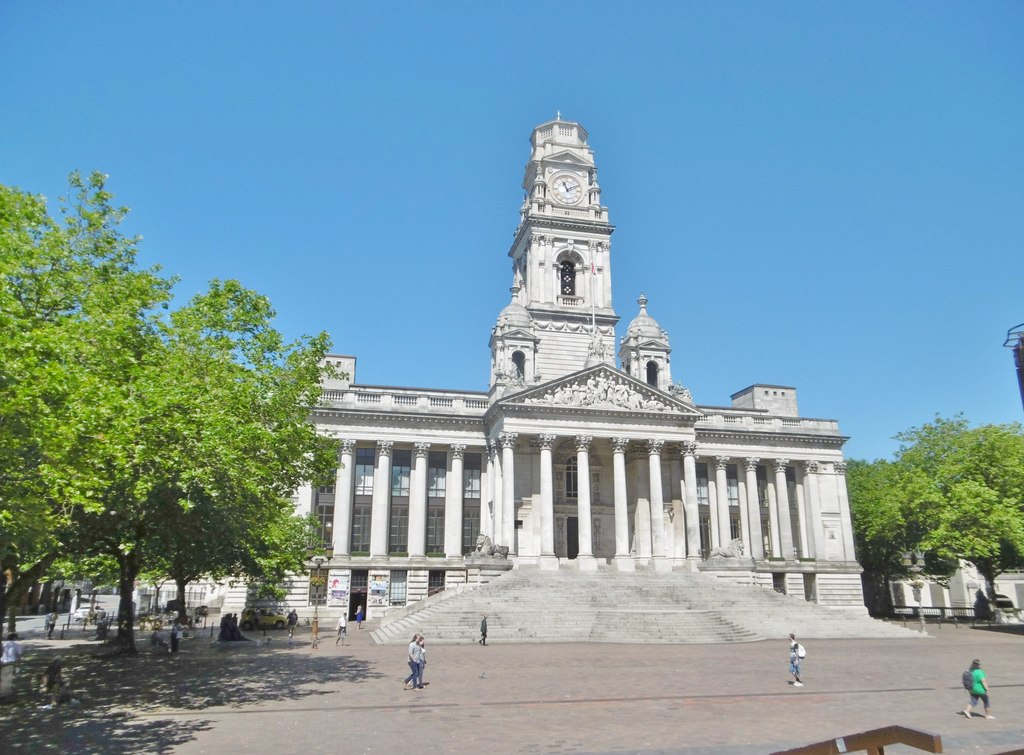
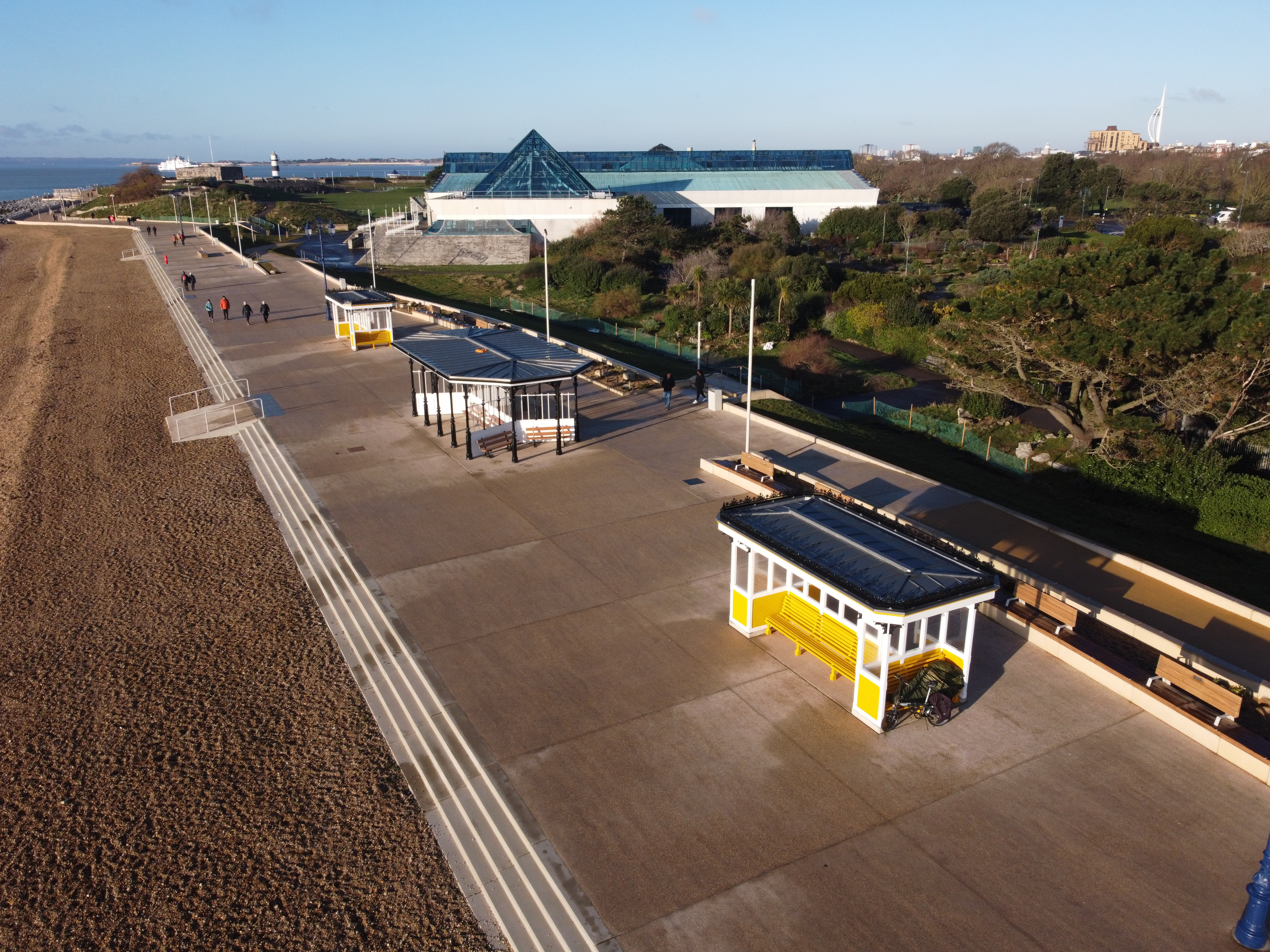
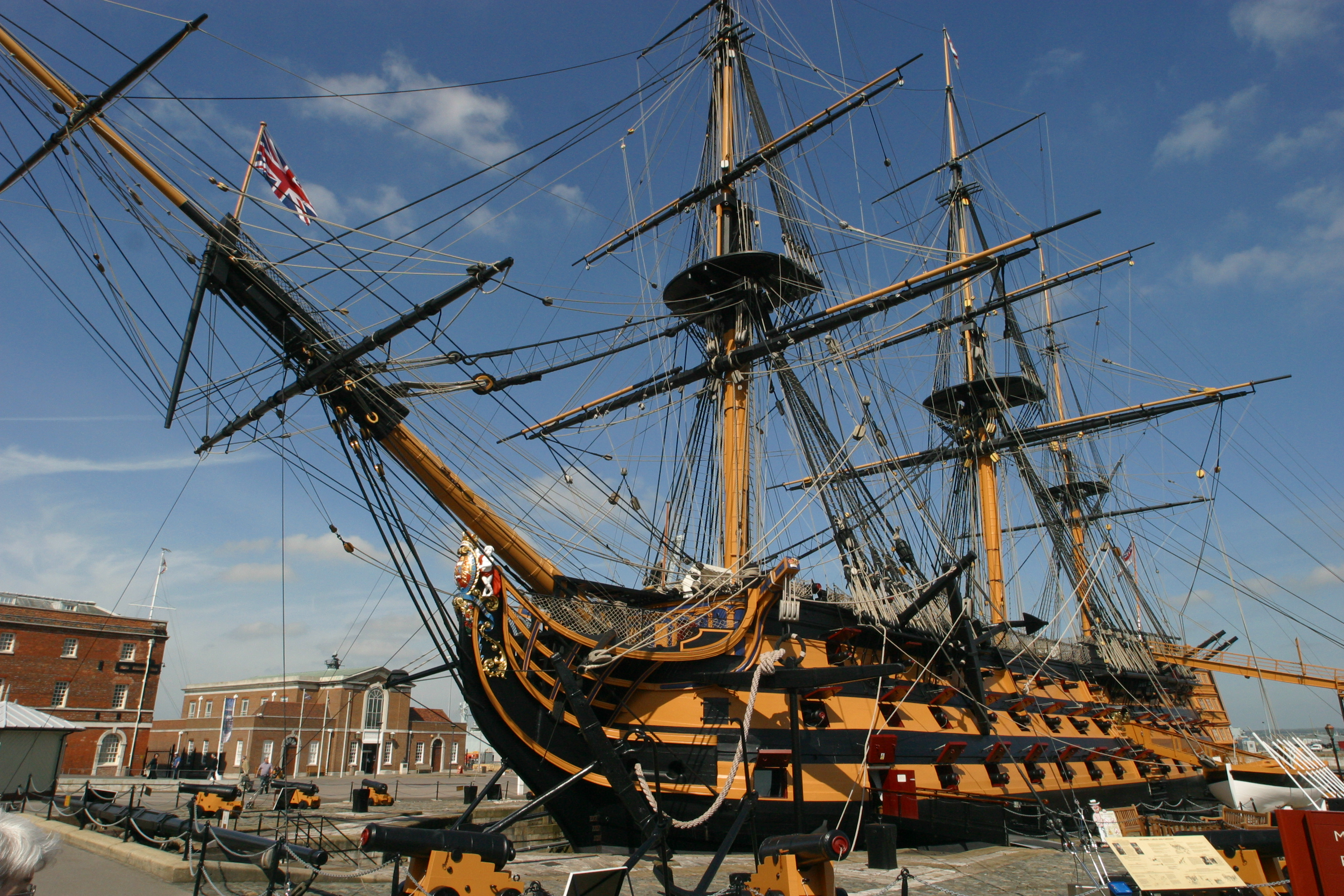
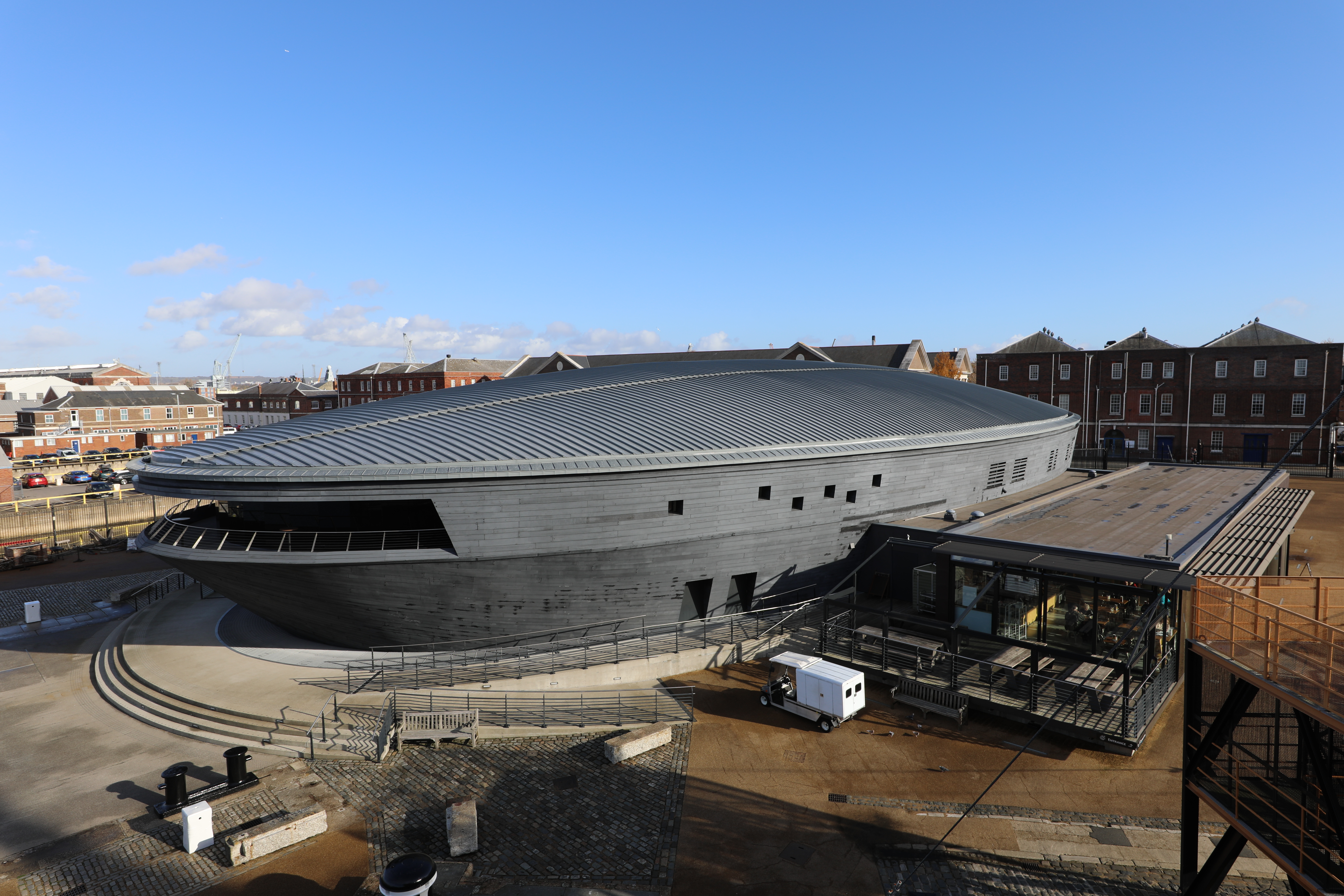
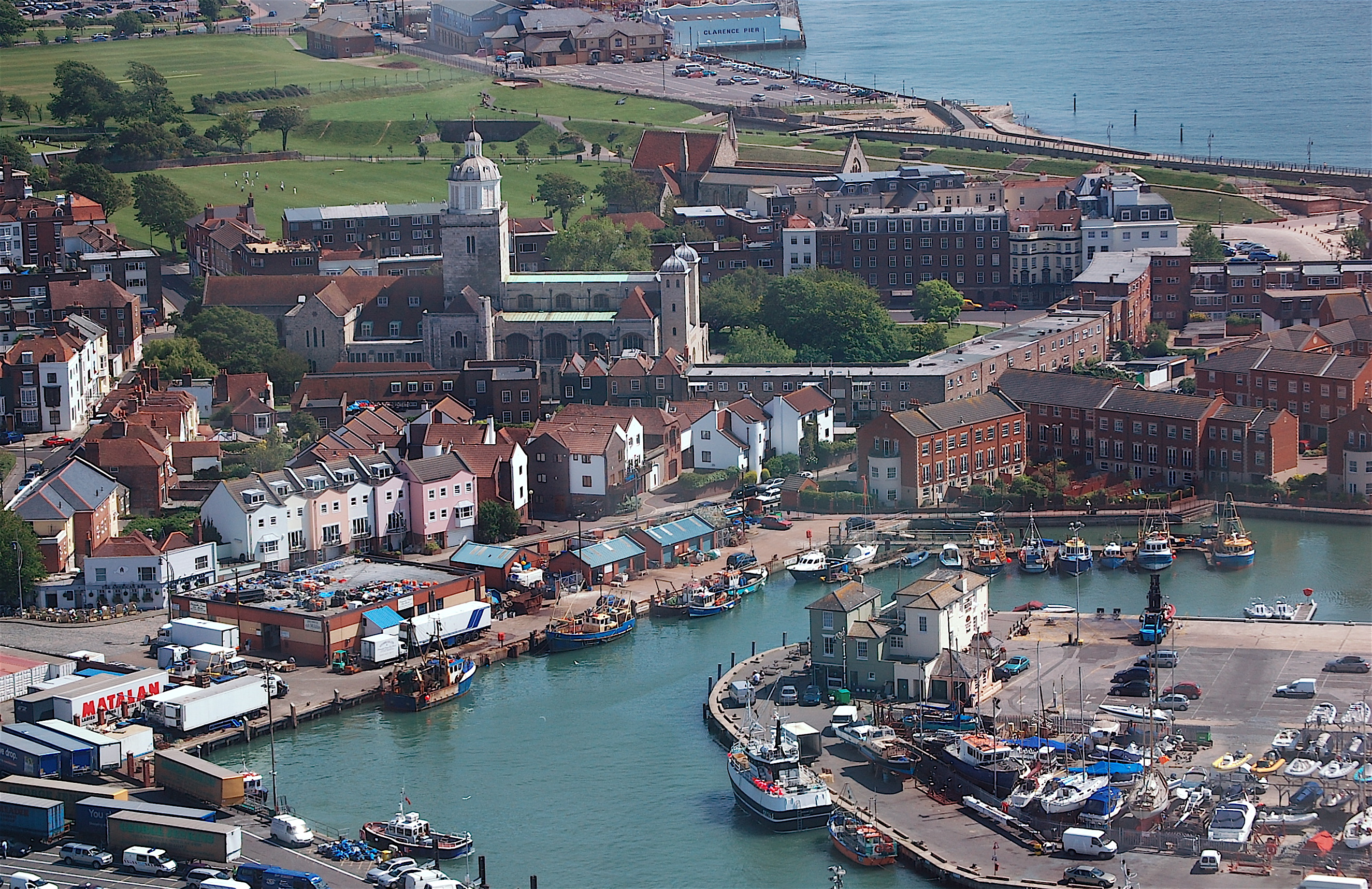
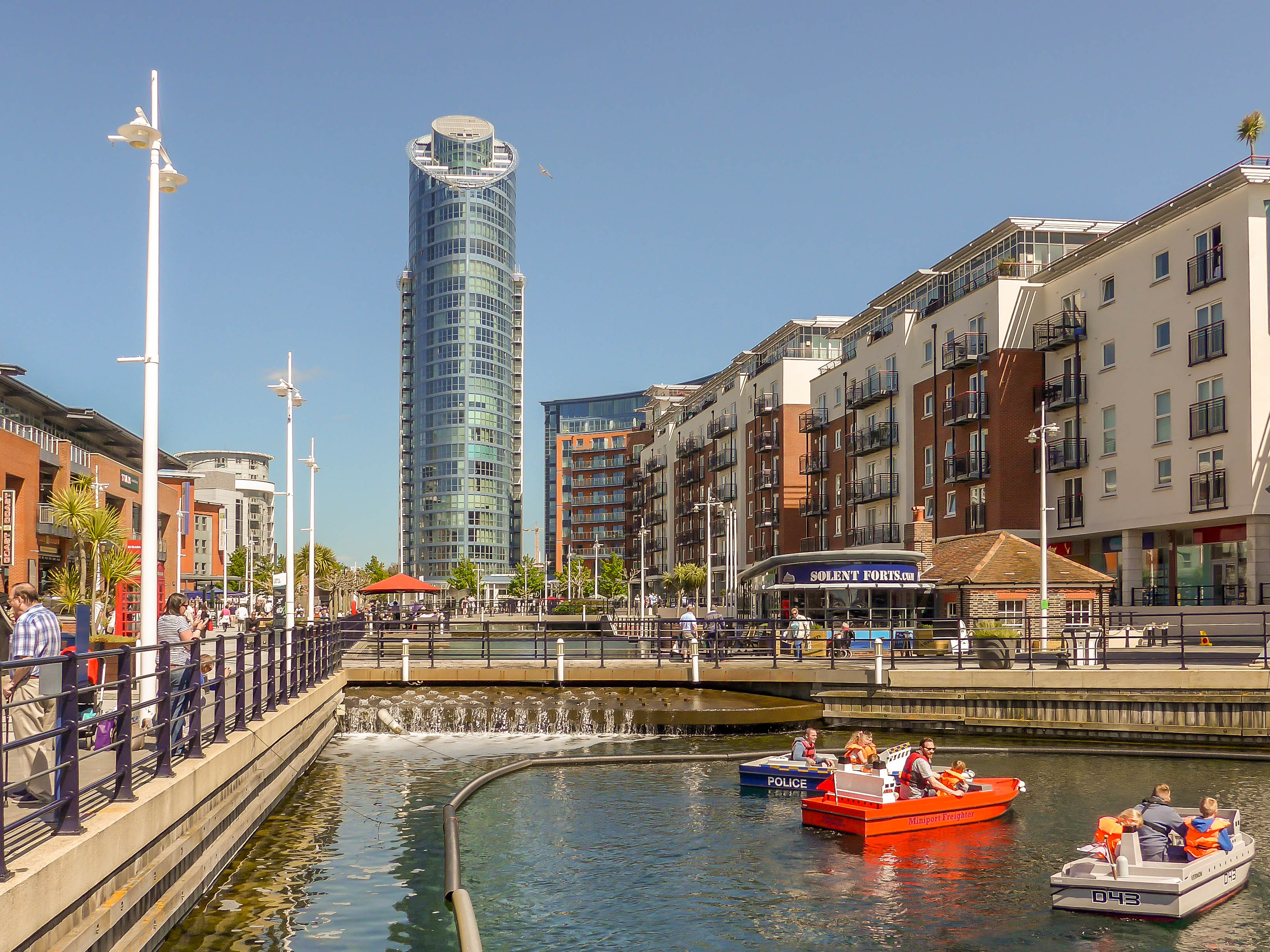
- Portsmouth Harbour, including Spinnaker Tower The Guildhall Southsea Beach HMS Victory Mary Rose Museum Old Portsmouth Gunwharf Quays

- Flag Coat of Arms
- Nickname: Pompey
- Motto: Heaven's Light Our Guide
- Shown within Hampshire

- Location within the United Kingdom
- Coordinates: 50°48′21″N 01°05′14″W
- Sovereign state: United Kingdom
- Country: England
- Region: South East England
- Ceremonial county: Hampshire

Government
  - Type: Unitary authority, city
  - Governing body: Portsmouth City Council
  - Leadership: (LD)
  - Lord Mayor: Abdul Kadir
  - Members of Parliament: Stephen Morgan (L); Amanda Martin (L)

Area
  - Total: 15.54 sq mi (40.25 km^{2})

Population (2025)
  - Total: 211,475
  - Rank: 95th
  - Density: 13,560/sq mi (5,236/km^{2})

Ethnicity (2021)
  - Ethnic groups: List: 85.2% White; 6.9% Asian; 3.4% Black; 2.6% Mixed; 1.8% other

Religion (2021)
  - Religion: List: 47.1% no religion; 39.4% Christianity; 6.4% not stated; 4.9% Islam; 0.8% Hinduism; 0.6% other; 0.5% Buddhism; 0.2% Sikhism; 0.1% Judaism
- Time zone: UTC+0 (GMT)
  - Summer (DST): UTC+1 (BST)
- Postal code: PO
- Area code: 023
- ISO 3166 code: GB-POR
- Police: Hampshire and Isle of Wight
- Ambulance: South Central
- Fire: Hampshire and Isle of Wight
- Website: portsmouth.gov.uk

Portsmouth (/ˈpɔːrtsməθ/ PORTS-məth) is a port city and unitary authority in Hampshire, England. Most of Portsmouth is located on Portsea Island off the south coast of England in the Solent, making Portsmouth the only city in England not located primarily on the mainland. The city is located 22 miles (35 km) south-east of Southampton, 50 miles (80 km) west of Brighton and Hove, and 74 miles (119 km) south-west of London. With a population of 211,475 in 2025, it is the most densely populated city in the United Kingdom. Portsmouth forms part of the South Hampshire urban area with Gosport, Fareham, Havant, Eastleigh and Southampton.

Portsmouth's history can be traced to Roman times and it has contained a significant Royal Navy dockyard and base for centuries. Portsmouth was founded c. 1180 by Anglo-Norman merchant Jean de Gisors in the south-west area of Portsea Island, a location now known as Old Portsmouth. Around this time, de Gisors ordered the construction of a chapel dedicated to St Thomas Becket. This became a parish church by the 14th century. Portsmouth was established as a town with a royal charter on 2 May 1194.

Portsmouth has the world's oldest dry dock currently in use, "The Great Stone Dock"; originally built in 1698, rebuilt in 1769 and presently known as "No.5 Dock". The world's first mass production line was established at the naval base's Block Mills which produced pulley blocks for the Royal Navy. By the early-19th century, Portsmouth was the most heavily fortified city in the world, and was considered "the world's greatest naval port" at the height of the British Empire throughout Pax Britannica. By 1859, a ring of defensive land and sea forts, known as the Palmerston Forts, had been built around Portsmouth in anticipation of an invasion from continental Europe.

Portsmouth achieved city status on 21 April 1926. During the Second World War the city was bombed extensively in the Portsmouth Blitz, which resulted in the deaths of 930 people, and it was a pivotal embarkation point for the D-Day landings. In 1982 a British task force departed from Portsmouth to serve in the Falklands War. HMY Britannia was formerly based in Portsmouth and oversaw the transfer of Hong Kong in 1997, after which Britannia was retired from royal service, decommissioned and relocated to Leith as a museum ship.

HMNB Portsmouth is an operational Royal Navy base and is home to two thirds of the UK's surface fleet. The base has long had the nickname Pompey, which it shares with the wider city of Portsmouth and Portsmouth Football Club. The naval base also contains the National Museum of the Royal Navy and Portsmouth Historic Dockyard, which has a collection of historic warships, including the Mary Rose, Lord Nelson's flagship, HMS Victory (the world's oldest naval ship still in commission), and HMS Warrior, the Royal Navy's first ironclad warship.

The former HMS Vernon shore establishment has been redeveloped into a large retail outlet destination known as Gunwharf Quays which opened in 2001. Portsmouth is among the few British cities with two cathedrals: the Anglican Cathedral of St Thomas and the Roman Catholic Cathedral of St John the Evangelist. The waterfront and Portsmouth Harbour are dominated by the Spinnaker Tower, one of the United Kingdom's tallest structures at 560 feet (170 m).

Southsea is Portsmouth's seaside resort, which was named after Southsea Castle. Southsea has two piers; Clarence Pier amusement park and South Parade Pier. The world's only regular hovercraft service operates from Southsea Hoverport to Ryde on the Isle of Wight. Southsea Common is a large open-air public recreation space which serves as a venue for a wide variety of annual events.

The city has several mainline railway stations that connect to London Victoria and London Waterloo amongst other lines in southern England. Portsmouth International Port is a commercial cruise ship and ferry port for international destinations. The port is the second busiest in the United Kingdom after Dover, handling around three million passengers a year. The city formerly had its own airport, Portsmouth Airport, until its closure in 1973. The University of Portsmouth enrolled 23,000 students.

Portsmouth is the birthplace of notable people such as author Charles Dickens, engineer Isambard Kingdom Brunel, former Prime Minister James Callaghan, actor Peter Sellers and author-journalist Christopher Hitchens.

== History ==
=== Early history ===
The Romans built Portus Adurni (now called Portchester Castle), a fort, at nearby Portchester in the late 3rd century. The city's Old English (Anglo-Saxon) name, "Portesmuða", is derived from port (a haven) and muða (the mouth of a large river or estuary). In the Anglo-Saxon Chronicle, a warrior named Port and his two sons killed a noble Briton in Portsmouth in 501. Winston Churchill, in A History of the English-Speaking Peoples, wrote that Port was a pirate who founded Portsmouth in 501.

England's southern coast was vulnerable to Danish Viking invasions during the eighth and ninth centuries, and was conquered by Danish pirates in 787. In 838, during the reign of Æthelwulf, King of Wessex, a Danish fleet landed between Portsmouth and Southampton and plundered the region. Æthelwulf sent Wulfherd and the governor of Dorsetshire to confront the Danes at Portsmouth, where most of their ships were docked. Although the Danes were driven off, Wulfherd was killed. The Danes returned in 1001 and pillaged Portsmouth and the surrounding area, threatening the English with extinction. They were massacred by the English survivors the following year; rebuilding began, although the town experienced further attacks until 1066.

=== Norman to Tudor ===
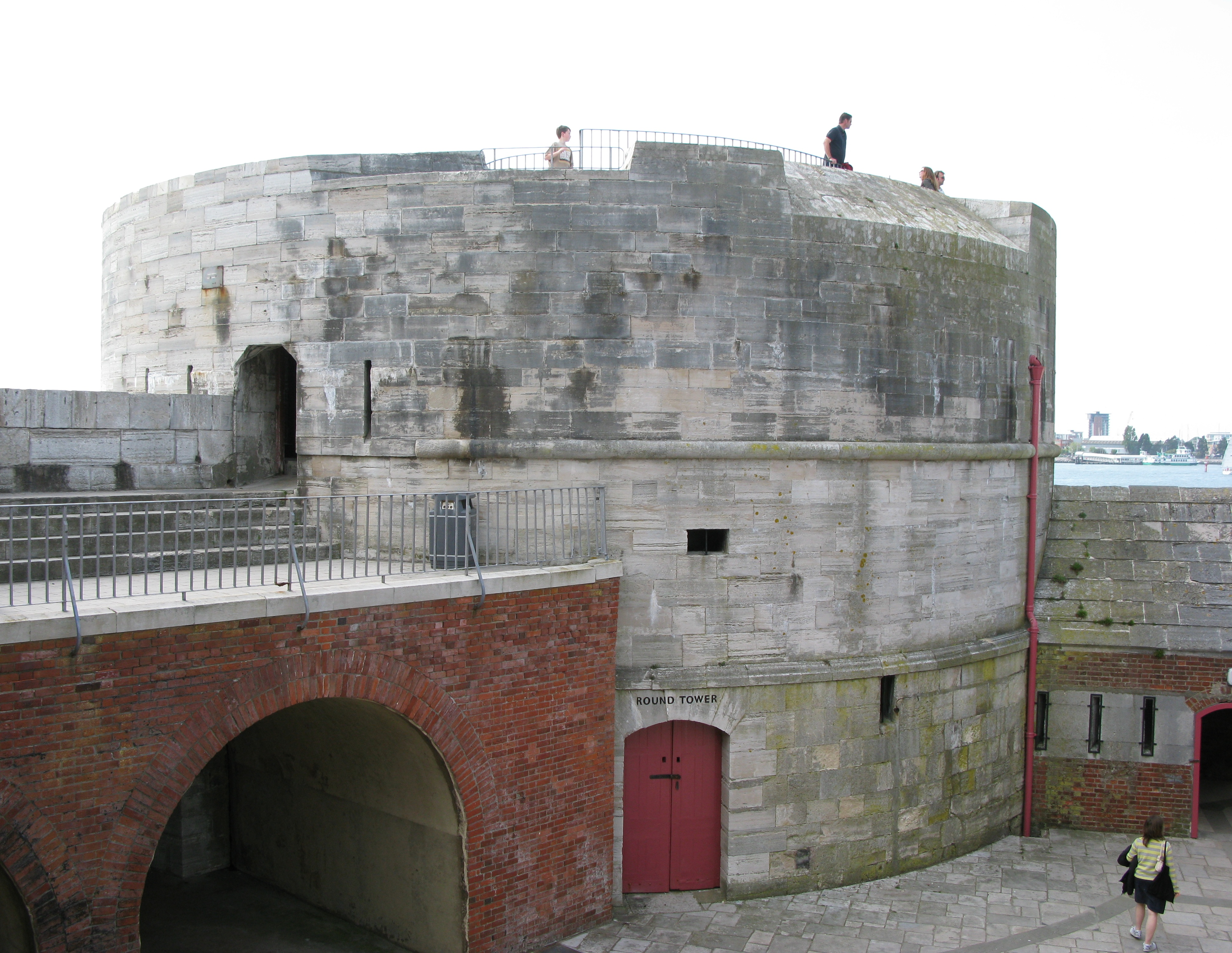
The Round Tower was built in 1418 to defend the entrance to Portsmouth Harbour.

Although Portsmouth was not mentioned in the 1086 Domesday Book, Bocheland (Buckland), Copenore (Copnor), and Frodentone (Fratton) were. According to some sources, it was founded in 1180 by the Anglo-Norman merchant Jean de Gisors.

King Henry II died in 1189; his son, Richard I (who had spent most of his life in France), arrived in Portsmouth en route to his coronation in London. When Richard returned from captivity in Austria in May 1194, he summoned an army and a fleet of 100 ships to the port. Richard gave Portsmouth market-town status with a royal charter on 2 May, authorising an annual fifteen-day free-market fair, weekly markets and a local court to deal with minor matters, and exempted its inhabitants from an £18 annual tax. The 1194 royal charter's 800th anniversary was celebrated in 1994 with ceremonies at the city museum.

King John reaffirmed Richard I's rights and privileges, and established a permanent naval base. The first docks were begun by William of Wrotham in 1212, and John summoned his earls, barons, and military advisers to plan an invasion of Normandy. In 1229, declaring war against France, Henry III assembled a force described by historian Lake Allen as "one of the finest armies that had ever been raised in England". The invasion stalled, and returned from France in October 1231. Henry III summoned troops to invade Guienne in 1242, and Edward I sent supplies for his army in France in 1295. Commercial interests had grown by the following century, and its exports included wool, corn, grain, and livestock.

Edward II ordered all ports on the south coast to assemble their largest vessels at Portsmouth to carry soldiers and horses to the Duchy of Aquitaine in 1324 to strengthen defences. A French fleet commanded by David II of Scotland attacked in the English Channel, ransacked the Isle of Wight and threatened the town. Edward III instructed all maritime towns to build vessels and raise troops to rendezvous at Portsmouth. Two years later, a French fleet led by Nicholas Béhuchet raided Portsmouth and destroyed most of the town; only the stone-built church and hospital survived. After the raid, Edward III exempted the town from national taxes to aid its reconstruction. In 1377, shortly after Edward died, the French landed in Portsmouth. Although the town was plundered and burnt, its inhabitants drove the French off to raid towns in the West Country.

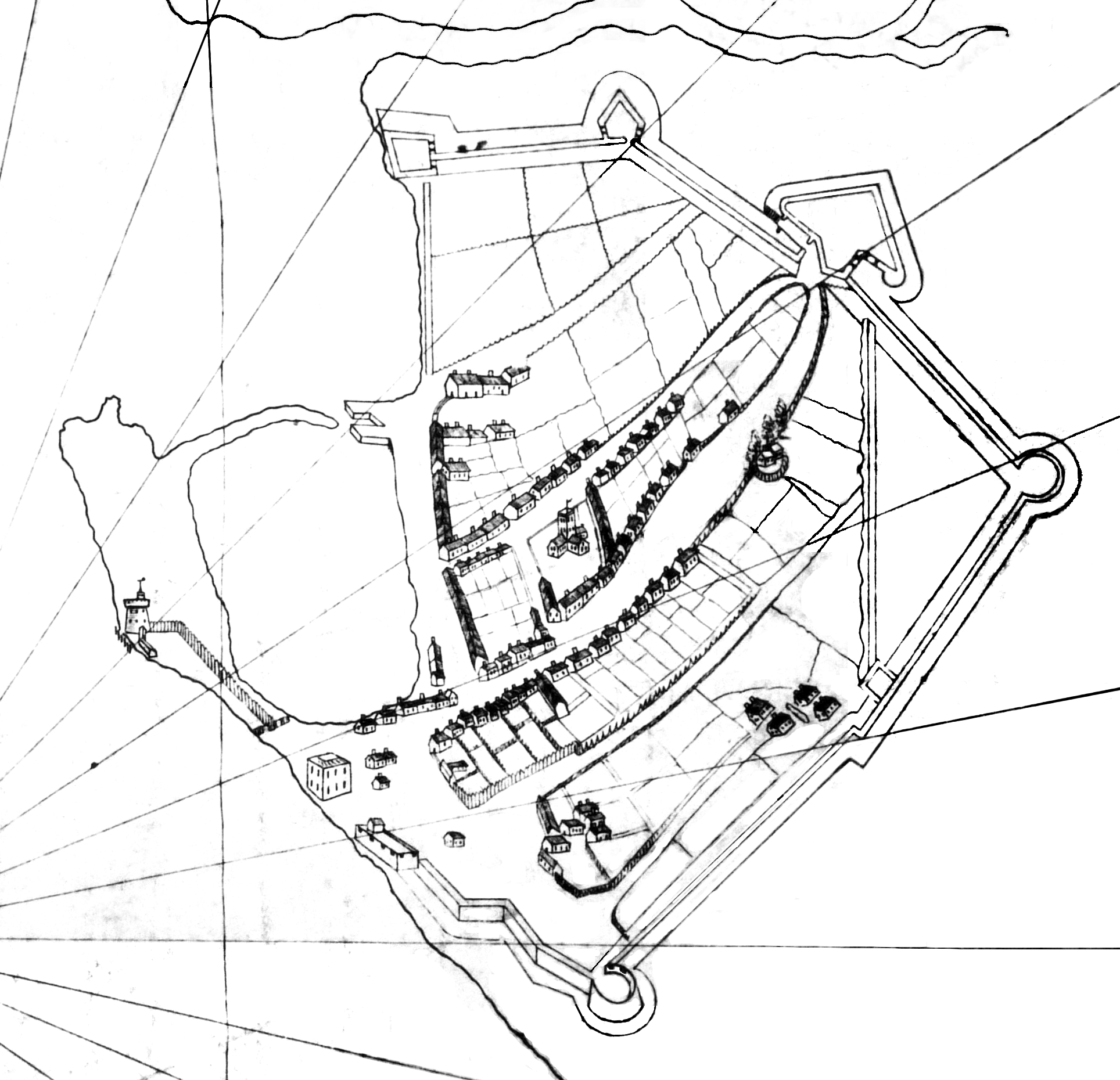
Portsmouth c. 1540

Henry V gathered his forces in Portsmouth for an invasion of France in 1415, it was while staying at Portchester Castle that the Southampton plot was uncovered. This campaign would culminate with victory at the battle of Agincourt. He also built Portsmouth's first permanent fortifications. In 1416, a number of French ships blockaded the town (which housed ships which were set to invade Normandy); Henry gathered a fleet at Southampton, and invaded the Norman coast in August that year. Recognising the town's growing importance, he ordered a wooden Round Tower to be built at the mouth of the harbour; it was completed in 1426. Henry VII rebuilt the fortifications with stone, assisted Robert Brygandine and Sir Reginald Bray in the construction of a dry dock, which is the world's oldest still in operation, and raised the Square Tower in 1494. He made Portsmouth a Royal Dockyard, England's only dockyard considered "national". Although King Alfred may have used Portsmouth to build ships as early as the ninth century, the first warship recorded as constructed in the town was the Sweepstake (built in 1497).

Henry VIII built Southsea Castle, financed by the Dissolution of the Monasteries, in 1539 in anticipation of a French invasion. He also invested heavily in the town's dockyard, expanding it to 8 acres (3.2 ha). Around this time, a Tudor defensive boom stretched from the Round Tower to Fort Blockhouse in Gosport to protect Portsmouth Harbour.

From Southsea Castle, Henry witnessed his flagship Mary Rose sink in action against the French fleet in the 1545 Battle of the Solent with the loss of about 500 lives. Some historians believe that the Mary Rose turned too quickly and submerged her open gun ports; according to others, it sank due to poor design. Portsmouth's fortifications were improved by successive monarchs. The town experienced an outbreak of plague in 1563, which killed about 300 of its 2,000 inhabitants.

=== Stuart to Georgian ===
A street view of Old Portsmouth — old buildings and cobbled streets.

In 1623, Charles I (then Prince of Wales) returned to Portsmouth from France and Spain. His unpopular military adviser, George Villiers, 1st Duke of Buckingham, was stabbed to death in an Old Portsmouth pub by war veteran John Felton five years later. Felton never attempted to escape, and was caught walking the streets when soldiers confronted him; he said, "I know that he is dead, for I had the force of forty men when I struck the blow". Felton was hanged, and his body chained to a gibbet on Southsea Common as a warning to others. The murder took place in the Greyhound public house on High Street, which is now Buckingham House and has a commemorative plaque.

Most residents (including the mayor) supported the parliamentarians during the English Civil War, although military governor Colonel Goring supported the royalists. The town, a base of the parliamentarian navy, was blockaded from the sea. Parliamentarian troops were sent to besiege it, and the guns of Southsea Castle were fired at the town's royalist garrison. Parliamentarians in Gosport joined the assault, damaging St Thomas's Church. On 5 September 1642, the remaining royalists in the garrison at the Square Tower were forced to surrender after Goring threatened to blow it up; he and his garrison were allowed safe passage out of the city.

After the end of the Civil War, Portsmouth was among the first towns to declare Charles II king and began to prosper. The first ship built in over 100 years, Portsmouth, was launched in 1650; twelve ships were built between 1650 and 1660. Under the Commonwealth of England, Robert Blake used the harbour as his base during the First Anglo-Dutch War in 1652 and the Anglo-Spanish War. He died within sight of the town, returning from Cádiz in 1657. After the Restoration, Charles II married Catherine of Braganza at the Royal Garrison Church on 14 May 1662. Catherine was reputed to have introduced the cultural practice of tea drinking to England at this event.

During the late 17th century, Portsmouth continued to grow; a new wharf was constructed in 1663 for military use, and a mast pond was dug in 1665. In 1684, a list of ships docked in Portsmouth was evidence of its increasing national importance. Between 1667 and 1685, the town's fortifications were rebuilt; new walls were constructed with bastions and two moats were dug, making Portsmouth one of the world's most heavily fortified places.

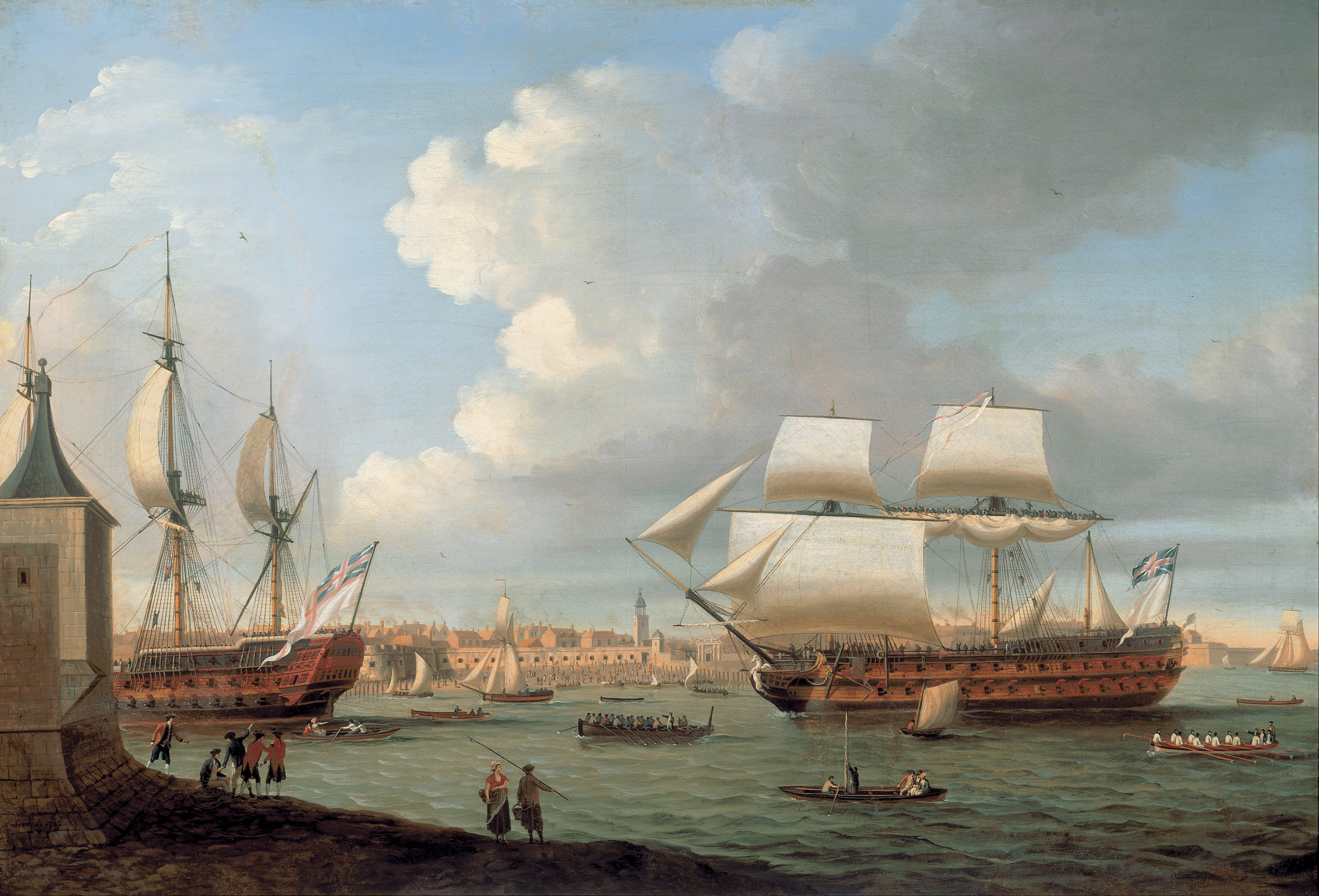
HMS Foudroyant (left) towing the captured French ship Pégase into Portsmouth Harbour on 30 April 1782

In 1759, General James Wolfe sailed to capture Quebec; the expedition, although successful, cost him his life. His body was brought back to Portsmouth in November, and received high naval and military honours. Two years later, on 30 May 1775, Captain James Cook arrived on HMS Endeavour after circumnavigating the globe. The 11-ship First Fleet left on 13 May 1787 to establish the first European colony in Australia, the beginning of prisoner transportation; Lieutenant William Bligh of HMS Bounty also sailed from the harbour that year. After the 28 April 1789 mutiny on the Bounty, HMS Pandora was dispatched from Portsmouth to bring the mutineers back for trial. The court-martial opened on 12 September 1792 aboard HMS Duke in Portsmouth Harbour; of the ten remaining men, three were sentenced to death. In 1789, a chapel was erected in Prince George's Street and was dedicated to St John by the Bishop of Winchester. Around this time, a bill was passed in the House of Commons on the creation of a canal to link Portsmouth to Chichester; however, the project was abandoned.

The city's nickname, Pompey, is thought to have derived from the log entry of Portsmouth Point (contracted "Po'm.P." – Po'rtsmouth P.oint) as ships entered the harbour; navigational charts use the contraction. According to one historian, the name may have been brought back from a group of Portsmouth-based sailors who visited Pompey's Pillar in Alexandria, Egypt, around 1781. Another theory is that it is named after the harbour's guardship, Pompee, a 74-gun French ship of the line captured in 1793.

Portsmouth's coat of arms is attested in the early 19th century as "azure a crescent or, surmounted by an estoile of eight points of the last." Its design is apparently based on 18th-century mayoral seals. A connection of the coat of arms with the Great Seal of Richard I (which had a separate star and crescent) dates to the 20th century.

=== Industrial Revolution to Edwardian ===
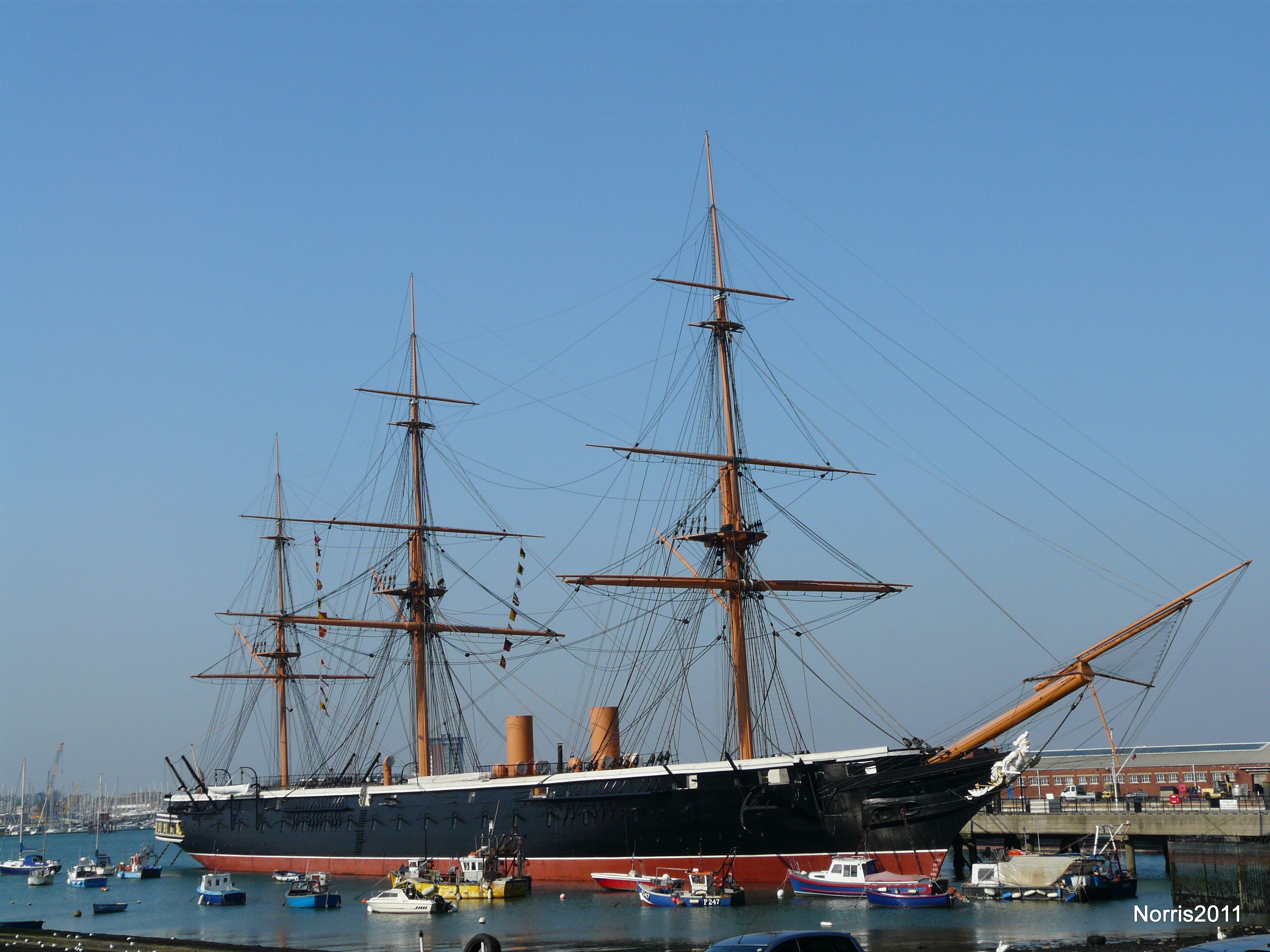
HMS Warrior (launched in 1860) has been restored to its original Victorian condition.

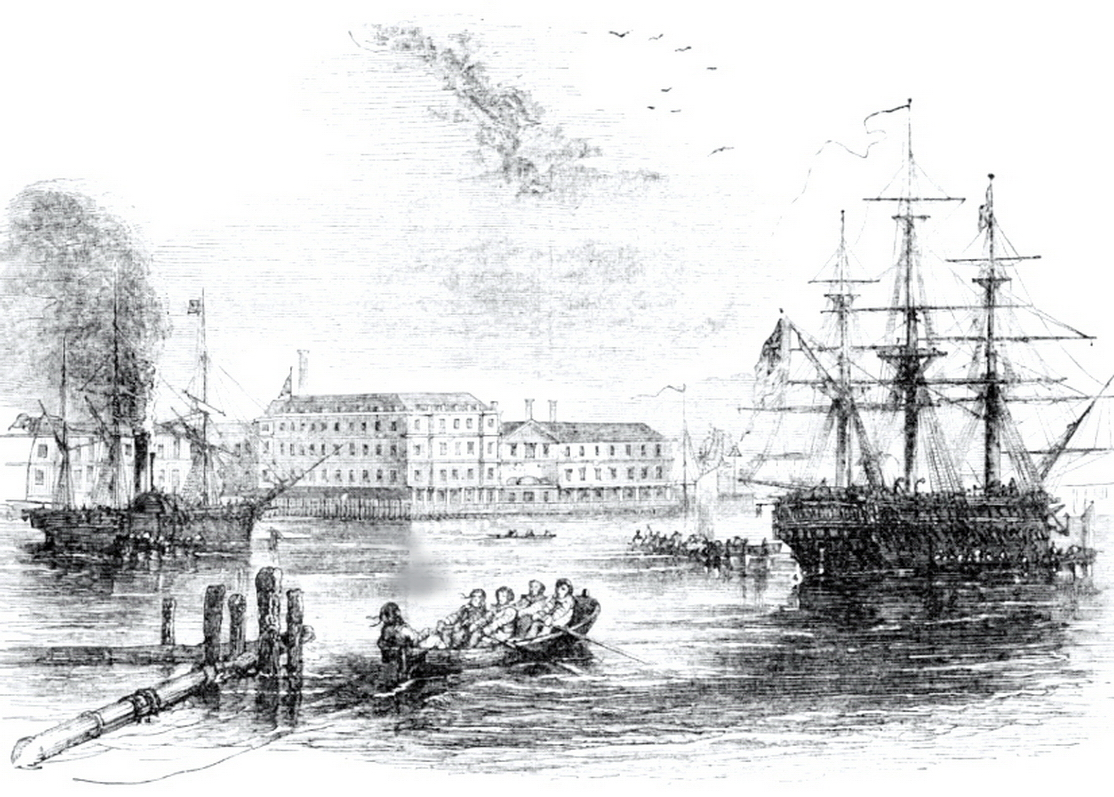
View of Portsmouth harbour about 1860

Marc Isambard Brunel established the world's first mass-production line at Portsmouth Block Mills, making pulley blocks for rigging on the navy's ships. The first machines were installed in January 1803, and the final set (for large blocks) in March 1805. In 1808, the mills produced 130,000 blocks. By the turn of the 19th century, Portsmouth was the largest industrial site in the world; it had a workforce of 8,000, and an annual budget of £570,000.

On 14 September 1805, Vice-Admiral of the White Horatio Nelson left Portsmouth to command the fleet which won the Battle of Trafalgar on 21 October. The Royal Navy's reliance on Portsmouth led to its becoming the most fortified city in the world. The Navy's West Africa Squadron, tasked with halting the Atlantic slave trade, began operating out of Portsmouth in 1808. A network of forts, known as the Palmerston Forts, was built around the town as part of a programme led by Prime Minister Lord Palmerston to defend British military bases from an inland attack following an Anglo-French war scare in 1859. The forts were nicknamed "Palmerston's Follies" because their armaments were pointed inland and not out to sea.

In April 1811, the Portsea Island Waterworks Company constructed the first piped-water supply to upper- and middle-class houses. It supplied water to about 4,500 of Portsmouth's 14,000 houses, generating an income of £5,000 a year. HMS Victory's active career ended in 1812, when she was moored in Portsmouth Harbour and used as a depot ship. The town of Gosport contributed £75 a year to the ship's maintenance. In 1818, John Pounds began teaching working-class children in the country's first ragged school. The Portsea Improvement Commissioners installed gas street lighting throughout Portsmouth in 1820, followed by Old Portsmouth three years later.

During the 19th century, Portsmouth expanded across Portsea Island. Buckland was merged into the town by the 1860s, and Fratton and Stamshaw were incorporated by the next decade. Between 1865 and 1870, the council built sewers after more than 800 people died in a cholera epidemic; according to a by-law, any house within 100 feet (30 m) of a sewer had to be connected to it. By 1871 the population had risen to 100,000, and the national census listed Portsmouth's population as 113,569. A working-class suburb was constructed in the 1870s, when about 1,820 houses were built, and it became Somerstown. Despite public-health improvements, 514 people died in an 1872 smallpox epidemic. On 21 December of that year, the Challenger expedition embarked on a 68,890-nautical-mile (127,580 km) circumnavigation of the globe for scientific research.

When the British Empire was at its height of power, covering a quarter of Earth's total land area and 458 million people at the turn of the 20th century, Portsmouth was considered "the world's greatest naval port". In 1900, Portsmouth Dockyard employed 8,000 people – a figure which increased to 23,000 during the First World War. The whole of Portsea Island came united under the control of Portsmouth borough council in 1904.

In 1906, HMS Dreadnought was launched from Portsmouth Dockyard. The ship revolutionised naval warfare and began an arms race with Germany. The ship's entry into service in 1906 represented such an advance in naval technology that her name came to be associated with an entire generation of battleships.

=== 1913 terrorist attack ===
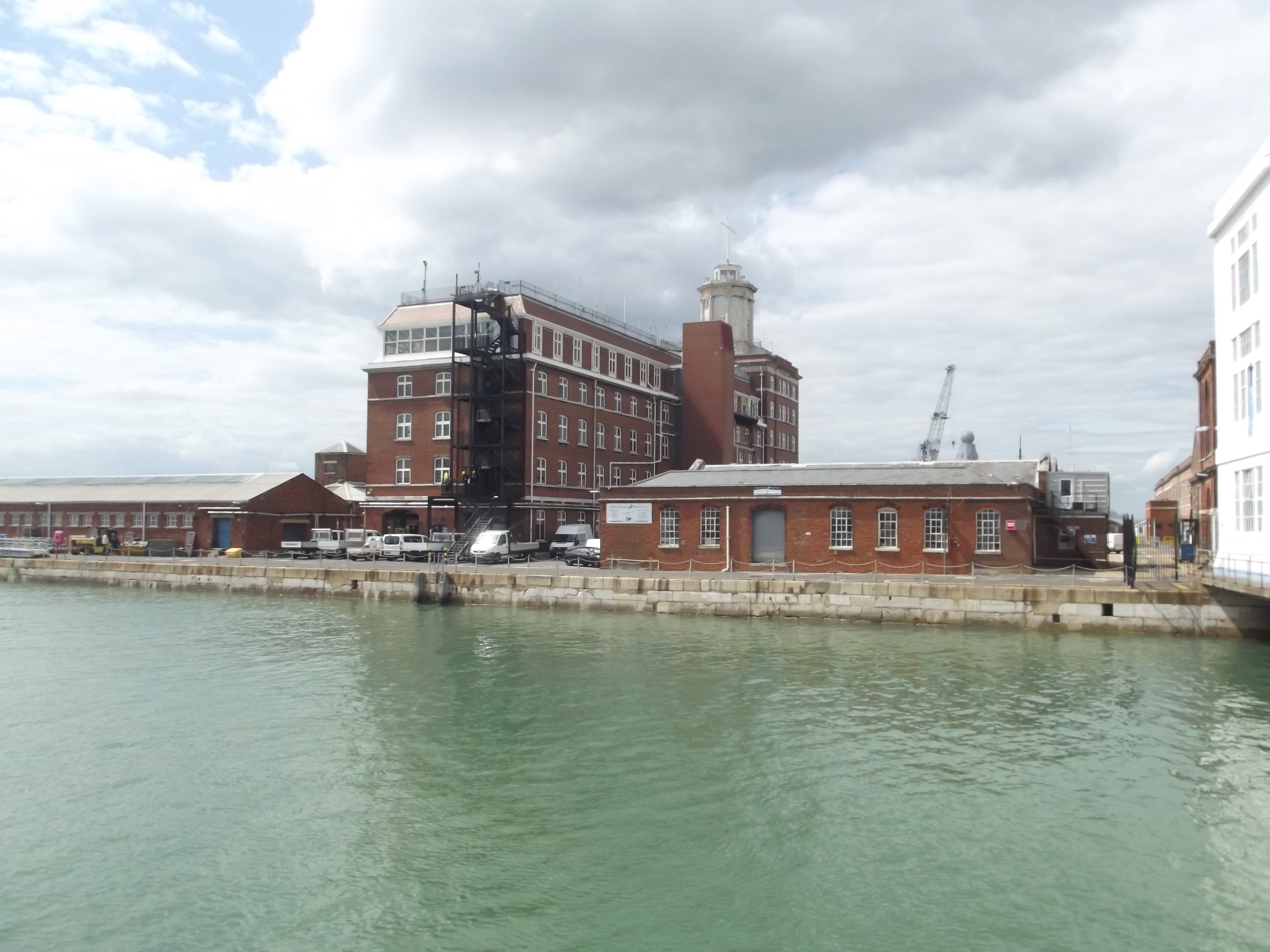
A fire started by suffragettes at the semaphore tower, Portsmouth dockyard, in December 1913, killed two men.

A major terrorist incident occurred in the city in 1913, which led to the deaths of two men. During the suffragette bombing and arson campaign of 1912–1914, militant suffragettes of the Women's Social and Political Union carried out a series of politically motivated bombing and arson attacks nationwide as part of their campaign for women's suffrage. In one of the more serious suffragette attacks, a fire was purposely started at Portsmouth dockyard on 20 December 1913, in which two sailors were killed after it spread through the industrial area. The fire spread rapidly as there were many old wooden buildings in the area, including the historic semaphore tower which dated back to the eighteenth century, which was completely destroyed. The damage to the dockyard area cost the city £200,000 in damages, equivalent to £23,600,000 today. In the midst of the firestorm, a battleship, HMS Queen Mary, had to be towed to safety to avoid the flames. The two victims were a pensioner and a signalman.

The attack was notable enough to be reported on in the press in the United States, with the New York Times reporting on the disaster two days after with the headline "Big Portsmouth Fire Loss". The report also disclosed that at a previous police raid on a suffragette headquarters, "papers were discovered disclosing a plan to fire the yard".

=== First and Second World Wars ===
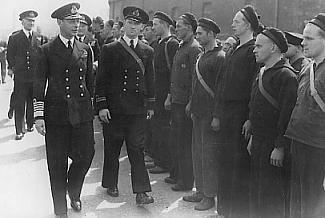
George VI inspecting the crew of the HNoMS Draug in Portsmouth during the Second World War

On 1 October 1916, Portsmouth was bombed by a Zeppelin airship. Although the Oberste Heeresleitung (German Supreme Army Command) said that the town was "lavishly bombarded with good results", there were no reports of bombs dropped in the area. According to another source, the bombs were mistakenly dropped into the harbour rather than the dockyard. About 1,200 ships were refitted in the dockyard during the war, making it one of the empire's most strategic ports at the time.

Portsmouth's boundaries were extended onto the mainland of Great Britain between 1920 and 1932 by incorporating Paulsgrove, Wymering, Cosham, Drayton and Farlington into Portsmouth. Portsmouth was granted city status in 1926 after a long campaign by the borough council. The application was made on the grounds that it was the "first naval port of the kingdom". In 1929, the city council added the motto "Heaven's Light Our Guide" to the medieval coat of arms. Except for the celestial objects in the arms, the motto was that of the Star of India and referred to the troopships bound for British India which left from the port. The crest and supporters are based on those of the royal arms, but altered to show the city's maritime connections: the lions and unicorn have fish tails, and a naval crown and a representation of the Tudor defensive boom which stretched across Portsmouth Harbour are around the unicorn's neck.

During the Second World War, the city (particularly the port) was bombed extensively by the Luftwaffe in the Portsmouth Blitz. Portsmouth experienced 67 air raids between July 1940 and May 1944, which destroyed 6,625 houses and severely damaged 6,549. The air raids caused 930 deaths and wounded almost 3,000 people, many in the dockyard and military establishments. On the night of the city's heaviest raid (10 January 1941), the Luftwaffe dropped 140 tonnes of high-explosive bombs which killed 171 people and left 3,000 homeless. Many of the city's houses were damaged, and areas of Landport and Old Portsmouth destroyed; the future site of Gunwharf Quays was razed to the ground. The Guildhall was hit by an incendiary bomb which burnt out the interior and destroyed its inner walls, although the civic plate was retrieved unharmed from the vault under the front steps. After the raid, Portsmouth mayor Denis Daley wrote for the Evening News:

We are bruised but we are not daunted, and we are still as determined as ever to stand side by side with other cities who have felt the blast of the enemy, and we shall, with them, persevere with an unflagging spirit towards a conclusive and decisive victory.

— Sir Denis Daley, January 1941

Portsmouth Harbour was a vital military embarkation point for the 6 June 1944 D-Day landings. Southwick House, just north of the city, was the headquarters of Supreme Allied Commander Dwight D. Eisenhower. A V-1 flying bomb hit Newcomen Road on 15 July 1944, killing 15 people.

=== 1945 to present ===
Much of the city's housing stock was damaged during the war. The wreckage was cleared in an attempt to improve housing quality after the war; before permanent accommodations could be built, Portsmouth City Council built prefabs for those who had lost their homes. More than 700 prefab houses were constructed between 1945 and 1947, some over bomb sites. The first permanent houses were built away from the city centre, in new developments such as Paulsgrove and Leigh Park; construction of council estates in Paulsgrove was completed in 1953. The first Leigh Park housing estates were completed in 1949, although construction in the area continued until 1974. Builders still occasionally find unexploded bombs, such as on the site of the destroyed Hippodrome Theatre in 1984. Despite efforts by the city council to build new housing, a 1955 survey indicated that 7,000 houses in Portsmouth were unfit for human habitation. A controversial decision was made to replace a section of the central city, including Landport, Somerstown and Buckland, with council housing during the 1960s and early 1970s. The success of the project and the quality of its housing are debatable.

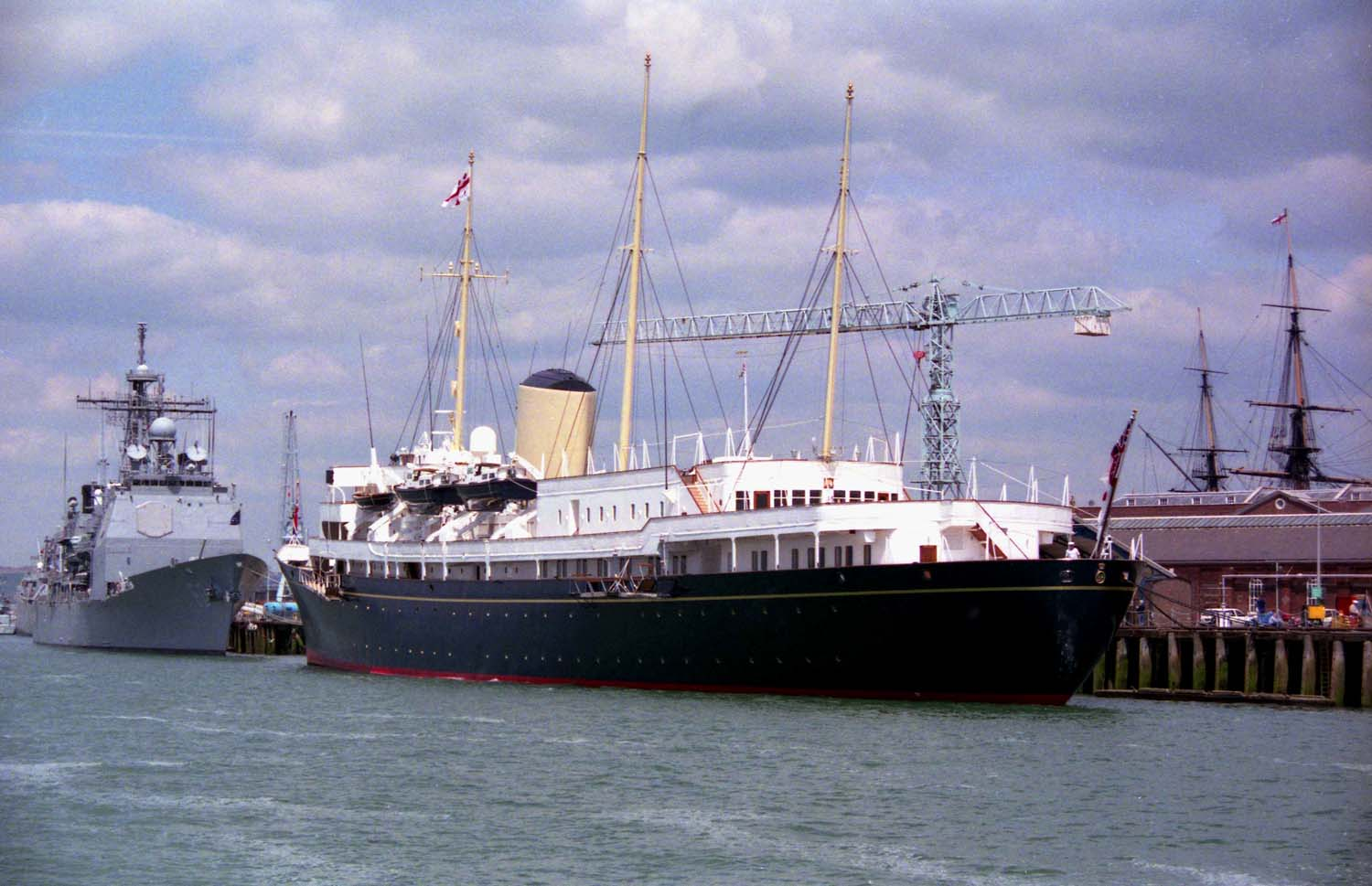
Her Majesty's Yacht Britannia in Portsmouth Harbour during the 50th anniversary of the D-Day Landings in 1994. The masts of HMS Victory can be seen in the background.

Portsmouth was affected by the decline of the British Empire in the second half of the 20th century. Shipbuilding jobs fell from 46 per cent of the workforce in 1951 to 14 per cent in 1966, drastically reducing manpower in the dockyard. The city council attempted to create new work; an industrial estate was built in Fratton in 1948, and others were built at Paulsgrove and Farlington during the 1950s and 1960s. Although traditional industries such as brewing and corset manufacturing disappeared during this time, electrical engineering became a major employer. Despite the cutbacks in traditional sectors, Portsmouth remained attractive to industry. Zurich Insurance Group moved their UK headquarters to the city in 1968, and IBM relocated their European headquarters in 1979. Portsmouth's population had dropped from about 200,000 to 177,142 by the end of the 1960s. Defence Secretary John Nott decided in the early 1980s that of the four home dockyards, Portsmouth and Chatham would be closed. The city council won a concession, however, and the dockyard was downgraded instead to a naval base.

In 1956, the Soviet cruiser Ordzhonikidze docked in Portsmouth harbour on a diplomatic mission that had taken head of state Nikita Khrushchev and Nikolai Bulganin to Britain. Naval intelligence was interested in the design of the ship and MI6 recruited diver Lionel Crabb to collect intelligence on the ship particularly its propulsion. After diving into the harbour Crabb was never seen again. This led to a diplomatic incident with the Soviet Union and scandal in British domestic politics.

On 2 April 1982, Argentine forces invaded two British territories in the South Atlantic: the Falkland Islands and South Georgia and the South Sandwich Islands. The British government's response was to dispatch a naval task force, and the aircraft carriers HMS Hermes and HMS Invincible sailed from Portsmouth for the South Atlantic on 5 April. The successful outcome of the war reaffirmed Portsmouth's significance as a naval port and its importance to the defence of British interests. In January 1997, Her Majesty's Yacht Britannia embarked from the city on her final voyage to oversee the handover of Hong Kong; for many, this marked the end of the empire. She was decommissioned on 11 December of that year at Portsmouth Naval Base in the presence of Elizabeth II, the Duke of Edinburgh, and twelve senior members of the royal family.

Redevelopment of the naval shore establishment HMS Vernon began in 2001 as a complex of retail outlets, clubs, pubs, and a shopping centre known as Gunwharf Quays. Construction of the 552-foot-tall (168 m) Spinnaker Tower, sponsored by the National Lottery, began at Gunwharf Quays in 2003. The Tricorn Centre, called "the ugliest building in the UK" by the BBC, was demolished in late 2004 after years of debate over the expense of demolition and whether it was worth preserving as an example of 1960s brutalist architecture. Designed by Owen Luder as part of a project to "revitalise" Portsmouth in the 1960s, it consisted of a shopping centre, market, nightclubs, and a multistorey car park. Portsmouth celebrated the 200th anniversary of the Battle of Trafalgar in 2005, with Queen Elizabeth II present at a fleet review and a mock battle. The naval base is home to two-thirds of Britain's surface fleet. The city also hosted international commemorations for 50th, 75th and 80th anniversaries of the D-Day landings, these were attended by international leaders and remaining veterans.

== Geography ==
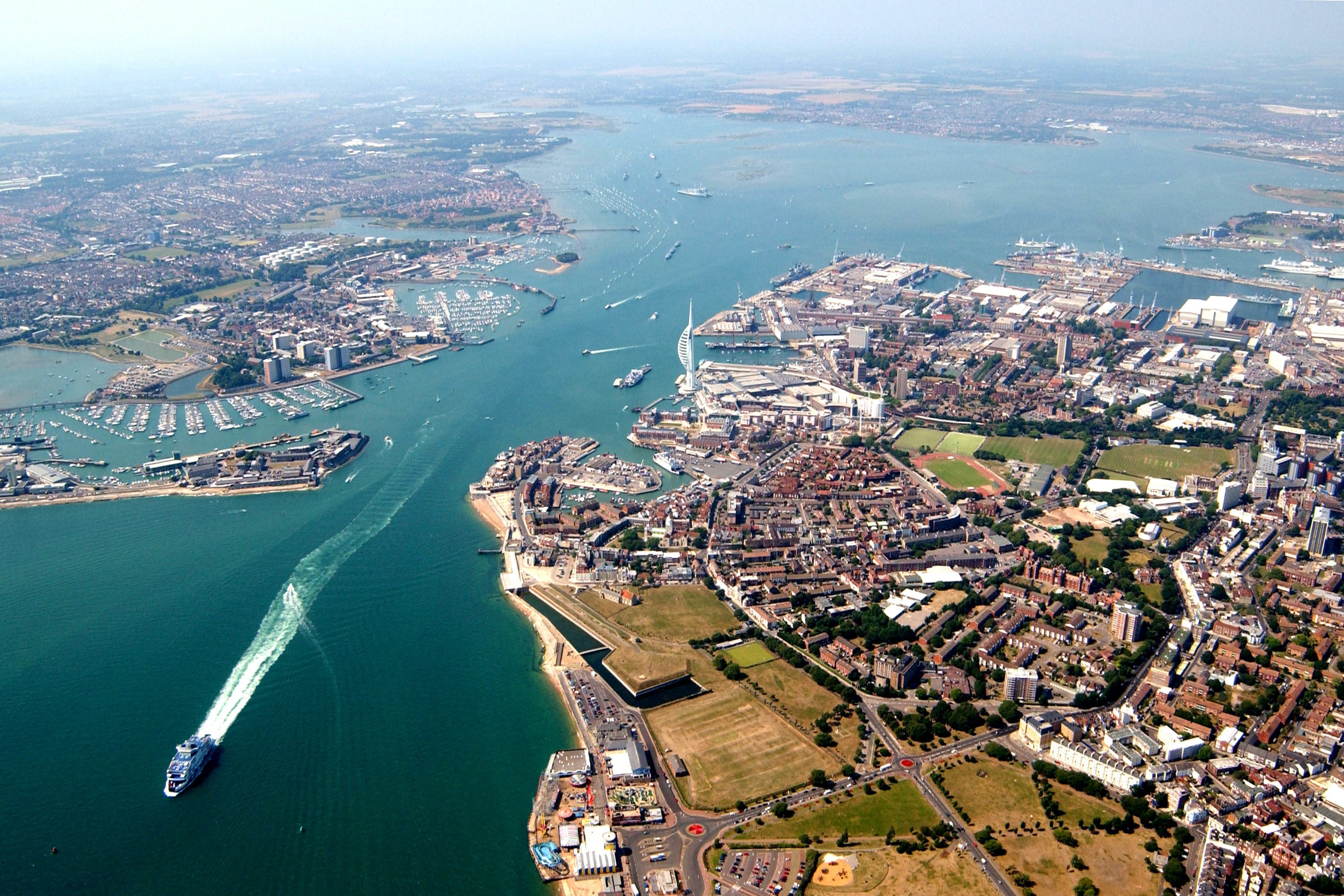
Aerial view of Portsmouth and Portsmouth Harbour

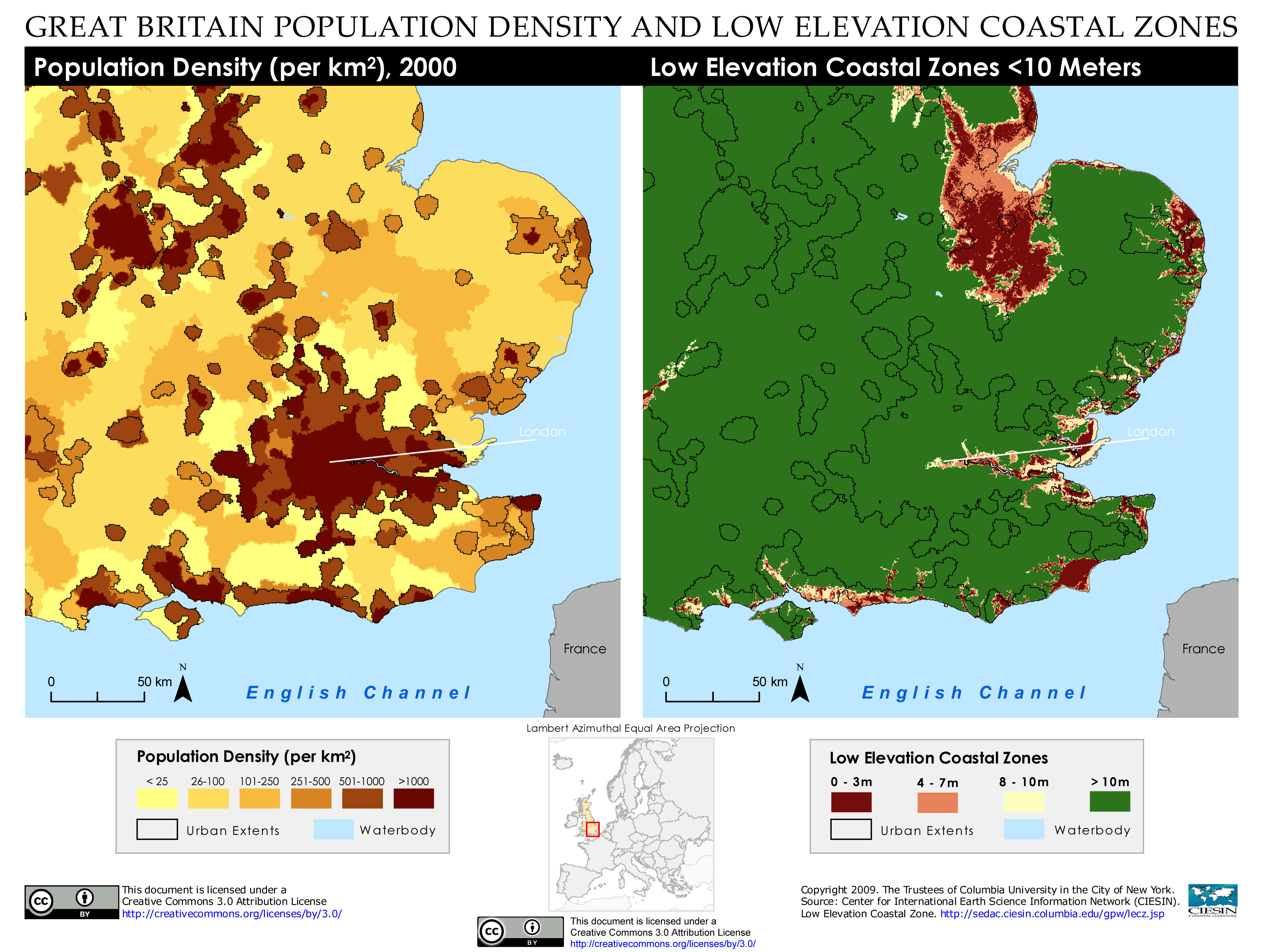
England population density and low elevation coastal zones. Portsmouth is particularly vulnerable to sea level rise.

Portsmouth is 73.5 miles (118.3 km) by road from central London, 49.5 miles (79.7 km) west of Brighton, and 22.3 miles (35.9 km) east of Southampton. It is located primarily on Portsea Island and is the United Kingdom's only island city, although the city has expanded to the mainland. Gosport is a town and borough to the west. Portsea Island is separated from the mainland by Portsbridge Creek, which is crossed by three road bridges (the M275 motorway, the A3 road, and the A2030 road), a railway bridge, and two footbridges. Portsea Island, part of the Hampshire Basin, is low-lying; most of the island is less than 3 metres (9.8 ft) above sea level. The island's highest natural elevation is the Kingston Cross road junction, at 21 feet (6.4 m) above ordinary spring tide.

Old Portsmouth, the original town, is in the south-west part of the island and includes Portsmouth Point (nicknamed Spice Island). The main channel entering Portsmouth Harbour, west of the island, passes between Old Portsmouth and Gosport. Portsmouth Harbour has a series of lakes, including Fountain Lake (near the commercial port), Portchester Lake (south central), Paulsgrove Lake (north), Brick Kiln Lake and Tipner (east), and Bombketch and Spider Lakes (west). Further northwest, around Portchester, are Wicor, Cams, and Great Cams Lakes. The large tidal inlet of Langstone Harbour is east of the island. The Farlington Marshes, in the north off the coast of Farlington, is a 125 hectares (310 acres) grazing marsh and saline lagoon. One of the oldest local reserves in the county, built from reclaimed land in 1771, it provides a habitat for migratory wildfowl and waders.

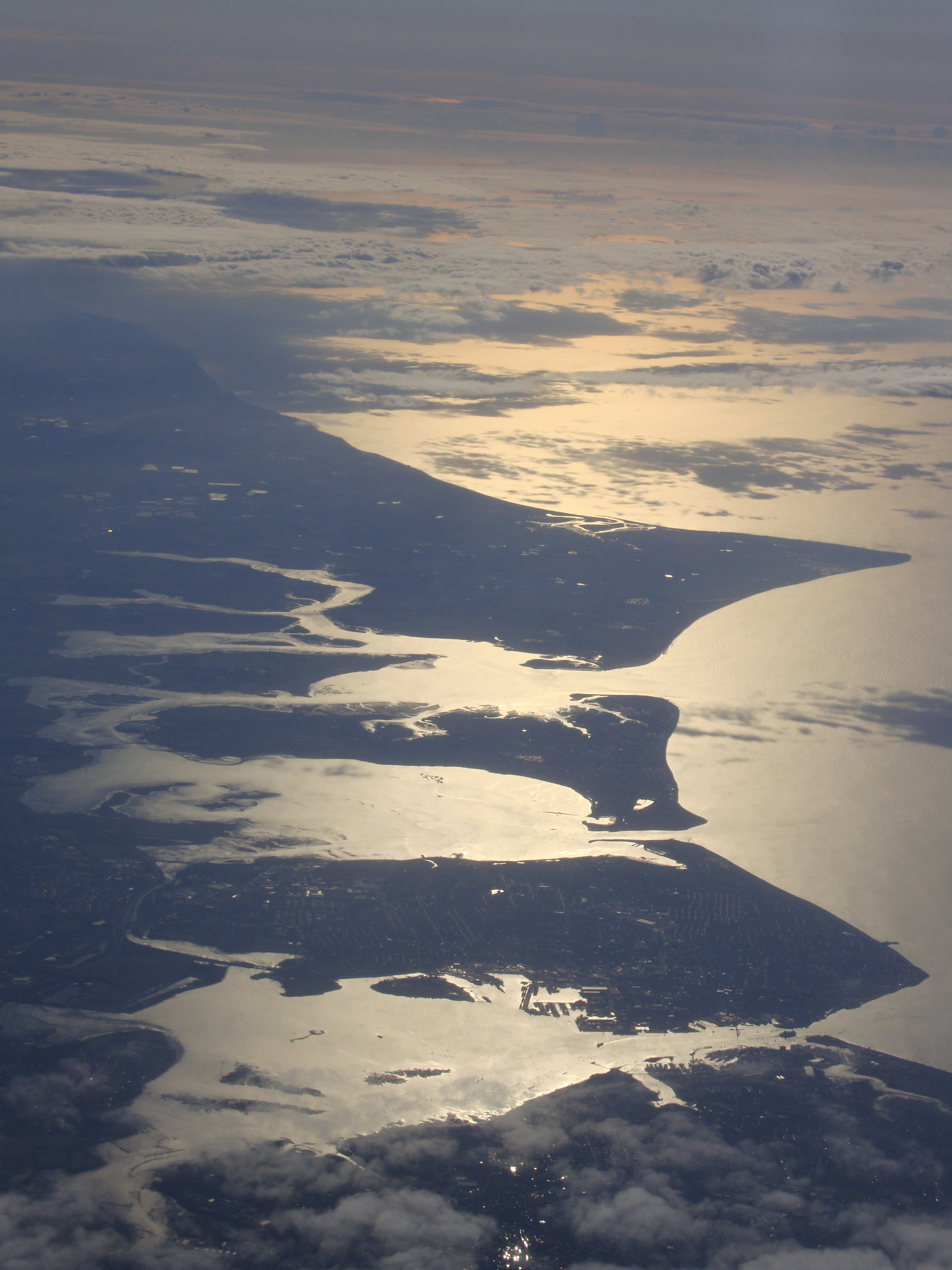
Portsea Island and Hayling Island

South of Portsmouth are Spithead, the Solent, and the Isle of Wight. Its southern coast was fortified by the Round Tower, the Square Tower, Southsea Castle, Lumps Fort and Fort Cumberland. Four Palmerston Forts were built in the Solent: Spitbank Fort, St Helens Fort, Horse Sand Fort and No Man's Land Fort.

The resort of Southsea is on the central southern shoreline of Portsea Island, and Eastney is east. Eastney Lake covered nearly 170 acres (69 hectares) in 1626. North of Eastney is the residential Milton and an area of reclaimed land known as Milton Common (formerly Milton Lake), a "flat scrubby land with a series of freshwater lakes". Further north on the east coast is Baffins, with the Great Salterns recreation ground and golf course around Portsmouth College.

The Hilsea Lines are a series of defunct fortifications on the island's north coast, bordering Portsbridge Creek and the mainland. Portsdown Hill dominates the skyline in the north, and contains several large Palmerston Forts (Note: These were part of a network of fortifications intended to guard military bases on the British coastline from an inland attack. They were built in the 19th century by order of Lord Palmerston.) such as Fort Fareham, Fort Wallington, Fort Nelson, Fort Southwick, Fort Widley, and Fort Purbrook. Portsdown Hill is a large band of chalk; the rest of Portsea Island is composed of layers of London Clay and sand (part of the Bagshot Formation), formed principally during the Eocene.

Northern areas of the city include Stamshaw, Hilsea and Copnor, Cosham, Drayton, Farlington, Paulsgrove and Port Solent. Other districts include North End and Fratton. The west of the city contains council estates, such as Buckland, Landport, and Portsea, which replaced Victorian terraces destroyed by Second World War bombing. After the war, the 2,000-acre (810 ha) Leigh Park estate was built to address the chronic housing shortage during post-war reconstruction. Although the estate has been under the jurisdiction of Havant Borough Council since the early 2000s, Portsmouth City Council remains its landlord (the borough's largest landowner).

The city's main station, Portsmouth and Southsea railway station, is in the city centre near the Guildhall and the Civic Offices. South of the Guildhall is Guildhall Walk, with a number of pubs and clubs. The city's other railway station, Portsmouth Harbour railway station, is located on a pier at the harbour's edge, near Old Portsmouth. Edinburgh Road contains the city's Roman Catholic cathedral and Victoria Park, a 15-acre (6.1 ha) park which opened in 1878.

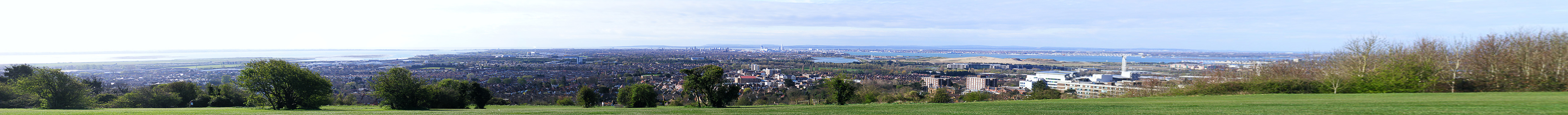
South-facing panorama of Portsmouth from Portsdown Hill. Langstone Harbour and Hayling Island are on the left, and Portsmouth Harbour is on the right.

=== Climate ===
Portsmouth has a mild oceanic climate, with more sunshine than most of the British Isles. Frosts are light and short-lived and snow is quite rare in winter, with temperatures rarely dropping below freezing. The average maximum temperature in January is 10 °C (50 °F), and the average minimum is 5 °C (41 °F). The lowest recorded temperature is −8 °C (18 °F). In summer, temperatures sometimes reach 30 °C (86 °F). The average maximum temperature in July is 22 °C (72 °F), and the average minimum is 15 °C (59 °F). The highest recorded temperature is 35 °C (95 °F). The city gets about 645 millimetres (25.4 in) of rain annually, with a minimum of 1 mm (0.04 in) of rain reported 103 days per year.

Climate data for Thorney Island, (Note: Weather station is located 8.0 miles (12.9 km) from the Portsmouth city centre.) (1991–2020 normals, extremes 1957–present)
Month	Jan	Feb	Mar	Apr	May	Jun	Jul	Aug	Sep	Oct	Nov	Dec	Year
Record high °C (°F)	13.6 (56.5)	15.8 (60.4)	20.7 (69.3)	24.2 (75.6)	27.2 (81.0)	34.1 (93.4)	34.1 (93.4)	33.3 (91.9)	29.0 (84.2)	25.2 (77.4)	17.9 (64.2)	14.9 (58.8)	34.1 (93.4)
Mean daily maximum °C (°F)	8.3 (46.9)	8.6 (47.5)	11.0 (51.8)	13.7 (56.7)	16.7 (62.1)	19.7 (67.5)	21.8 (71.2)	21.8 (71.2)	19.4 (66.9)	15.6 (60.1)	11.7 (53.1)	9.0 (48.2)	14.8 (58.6)
Daily mean °C (°F)	5.6 (42.1)	5.7 (42.3)	7.5 (45.5)	9.7 (49.5)	12.7 (54.9)	15.7 (60.3)	17.7 (63.9)	17.8 (64.0)	15.5 (59.9)	12.3 (54.1)	8.7 (47.7)	6.2 (43.2)	11.3 (52.3)
Mean daily minimum °C (°F)	2.8 (37.0)	2.7 (36.9)	4.0 (39.2)	5.7 (42.3)	8.7 (47.7)	11.6 (52.9)	13.6 (56.5)	13.7 (56.7)	11.5 (52.7)	8.9 (48.0)	5.6 (42.1)	3.3 (37.9)	7.7 (45.9)
Record low °C (°F)	−9.2 (15.4)	−7.0 (19.4)	−6.9 (19.6)	−3.8 (25.2)	−1.6 (29.1)	1.4 (34.5)	6.0 (42.8)	3.6 (38.5)	2.2 (36.0)	−2.8 (27.0)	−6.3 (20.7)	−8.7 (16.3)	−9.2 (15.4)
Average precipitation mm (inches)	84.5 (3.33)	57.7 (2.27)	49.9 (1.96)	49.6 (1.95)	43.3 (1.70)	48.2 (1.90)	46.9 (1.85)	57.2 (2.25)	61.4 (2.42)	86.0 (3.39)	90.6 (3.57)	92.6 (3.65)	767.7 (30.22)
Average precipitation days (≥ 1.0 mm)	13.0	10.1	9.2	9.1	8.0	7.7	7.5	8.4	8.1	11.3	12.9	12.8	118.1
Mean monthly sunshine hours	64.9	85.1	129.7	186.5	221.8	217.8	232.1	213.5	163.1	118.1	78.1	61.1	1,771.7
Source 1: Met Office
Source 2: Starlings Roost Weather

== Demography ==
Population pyramid of Portsmouth (unitary authority) in 2021

Portsmouth is the second-most densely populated city in the United Kingdom, after London. In the 2021 census, the city had 208,100 residents. The city used to be even more densely populated, with the 1951 census showing a population of 233,545. In a reversal of that decrease, its population has been gradually increasing since the 1990s. With about 860,000 residents, South Hampshire is the fifth-largest urban area in England and the largest in South East England outside London; it is the centre of one of the United Kingdom's most-populous metropolitan areas.

The city is predominantly white (85.3% of the population). However, Portsmouth's long association with the Royal Navy ensures some diversity. Some large, well-established non-white communities have their roots in the Royal Navy, particularly the Chinese community from British Hong Kong. Portsmouth's long industrial history with the Royal Navy has drawn many people from across the British Isles (particularly Irish Catholics) to its factories and docks. (Note: Portsmouth is one of 34 British towns and cities with a Catholic cathedral.) According to the 2021 census, Portsmouth's population was 78% White British, 6.8% other White, 2.3% Bangladeshi, 2.6% mixed race, 1.5% Indian, 1.0% Chinese, 1.8% other, 0.5% Black African, 0.5% white Irish, 1.8% other Asian, 0.3% Pakistani, 2.6% Black Caribbean and 0.4% other Black.

Population growth in Portsmouth since 1310
Year	1310	1560	1801	1851	1901	1951	1961	1971	1981	1991	2001	2011	2021
Population	740 (est)	1000 (est)	32,160	72,096	188,133	233,545	215,077	197,431	175,382	177,142	186,700	205,400	208,100

=== Ethnicity ===
Ethnic Group	Year									
Ethnic Group	1981 estimations		1991		2001		2011		2021	
Ethnic Group	Number	%	Number	%	Number	%	Number	%	Number	%
White: Total	165,149	97.5%	170,210	97.3%	176,882	94.7%	181,182	88.4%	177,277	85.3%
White: British	–	–	–	–	171,510	91.9%	172,313	84%	161,664	77.7%
White: Irish	–	–	–	–	1,339		1,071		1,066	0.5%
White: Gypsy or Irish Traveller	–	–	–	–	–	–	85		118	0.1%
White: Roma	–	–	–	–	–	–	–	–	324	0.2%
White: Other	–	–	–	–	4,033		7,713		14,105	6.8%
Asian or Asian British: Total	–	–	2,879	1.6%	6,162	3.3%	12,474	6.1%	14,370	6.9%
Asian or Asian British: Indian	–	–	702		1,320		2,911		3,104	1.5%
Asian or Asian British: Pakistani	–	–	68		215		539		603	0.3%
Asian or Asian British: Bangladeshi	–	–	1,046		2,522		3,649		4,742	2.3%
Asian or Asian British: Chinese	–	–	725	0.4%	1,607		2,611		2,116	1.0%
Asian or Asian British: Other Asian	–	–	338		498		2,764		3,805	1.8%
Black or Black British: Total	–	–	778	0.4%	942	0.5%	3,777	1.8%	7,070	3.5%
Black or Black British: Caribbean	–	–	175		219		540		5,369	2.6%
Black or Black British: African	–	–	246		601		2,958		950	0.5%
Black or Black British: Other Black	–	–	357		122		279		751	0.4%
Mixed or British Mixed: Total	–	–	–	–	1,859	1%	5,467	2.7%	5,487	2.6%
Mixed: White and Black Caribbean	–	–	–	–	414		1,103		1,176	0.6%
Mixed: White and Black African	–	–	–	–	235		935		1,244	0.6%
Mixed: White and Asian	–	–	–	–	560		2,381		1,540	0.7%
Mixed: Other Mixed	–	–	–	–	650		1,048		1,527	0.7%
Other: Total	–	–	830	0.5%	856	0.5%	2,156	1.1%	3,797	1.8%
Other: Arab	–	–	–	–	–	–	1,078		1,007	0.5%
Other: Any other ethnic group	–	–	830		856		1,078		2,790	1.3%
Non-White: Total	4,203	2.5%	4,487	2.7%	9,819	5.3%	23,874	11.6%	30,724	14.3%
Total	169,352	100%	174,697	100%	186,701	100%	205,056	100%	208,001	100%

== Politics ==
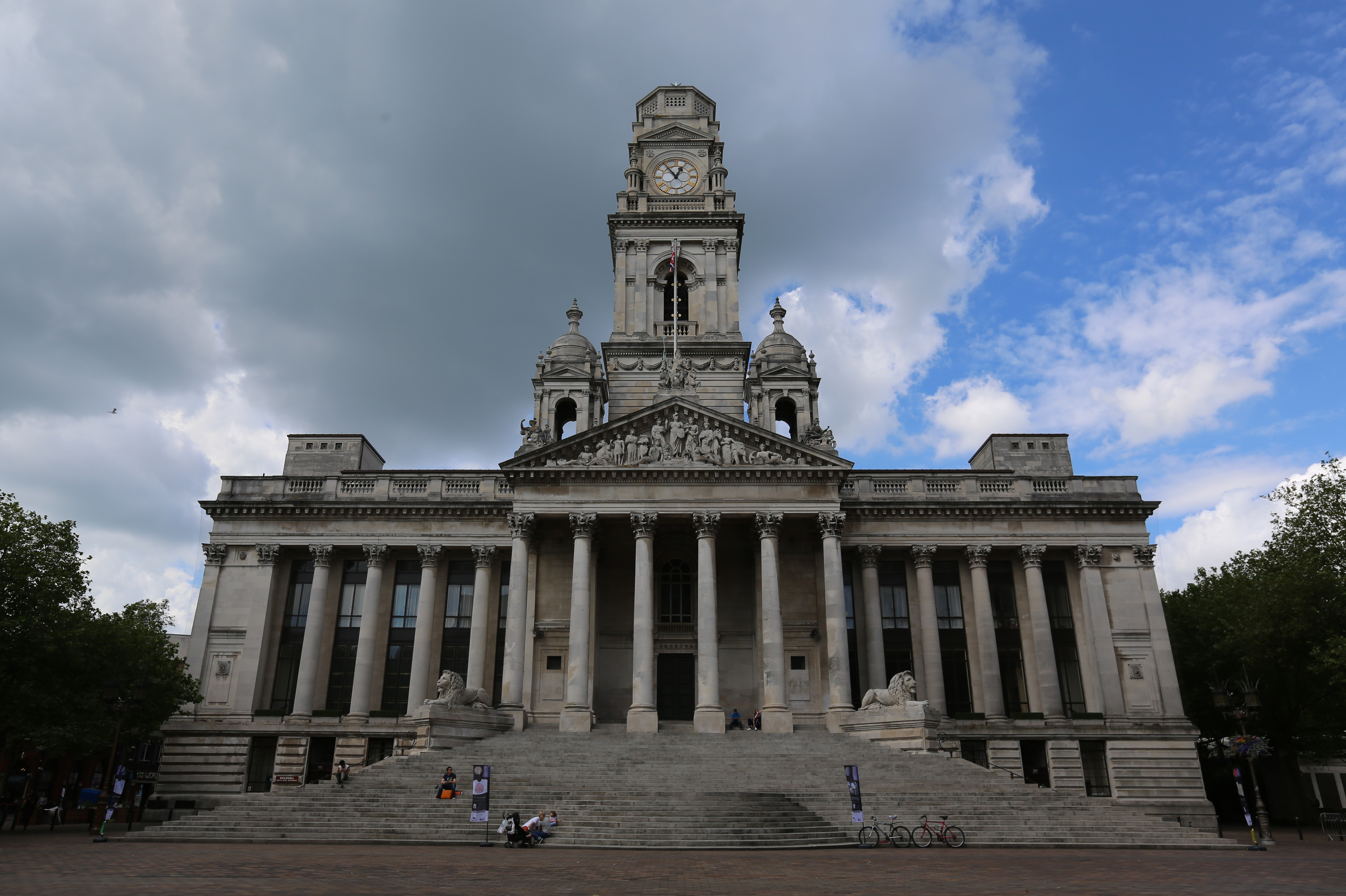
The neo-classical Portsmouth Guildhall and surrounding Civic Offices are the centre of government.

Portsmouth North

Portsmouth South

The 14 electoral wards of Portsmouth

The city is administered by Portsmouth City Council, a unitary authority which is responsible for local affairs. Portsmouth was granted its first market town charter in 1194. In 1904, its boundaries were extended to all of Portsea Island and were later expanded onto the mainland of Great Britain between 1920 and 1932 by incorporating Paulsgrove, Wymering, Cosham, Drayton and Farlington into Portsmouth. Portsmouth was granted city status on 21 April 1926.

On 1 April 1974, it formed the second tier of local government (below Hampshire County Council); Portsmouth and Southampton became administratively independent of Hampshire with the creation of the unitary authority on 1 April 1997.

The city is divided into two parliamentary constituencies, Portsmouth South and Portsmouth North, represented in the House of Commons by Stephen Morgan and Amanda Martin, both of the Labour Party. The two Parliamentary constituencies each contain 7 electoral wards, giving an overall total of 14 electoral wards. Portsmouth's inner city centre is located in the Portsmouth South constituency.

Portsmouth City Council has 14 electoral wards, each ward returns three councillors, making 42 in total. Each councillor serves a four-year term. Following the May 2018 local elections, the Liberal Democrats formed a minority administration, they have run the city since then. The leader of the council is the Liberal Democrat, Gerald Vernon-Jackson. The lord mayor usually has a one-year term.

The council is based in the Civic Offices, which house the tax support, housing-benefits, resident-services, and municipal-functions departments. They are in Guildhall Square, with the Portsmouth Guildhall and Portsmouth Central Library. The Guildhall, a symbol of Portsmouth, is a cultural venue. It was designed by Leeds-based architect William Hill, who began it in the neo-classical style in 1873 at a cost of £140,000. It was opened to the public in 1890.

In March 2026, the government announced that it would abolish the existing city council in 2028 as part of local government reform across Hampshire. These proposals were withdrawn in September 2026.

=== Minister for Portsmouth ===
Between January 2014 and July 2016, Portsmouth uniquely had a dedicated government minister, the Minister for Portsmouth, a position created in response to the loss of 900 jobs from BAE Systems within HMNB Portsmouth. The minister was charged with bringing economic growth to the city.

== Economy ==
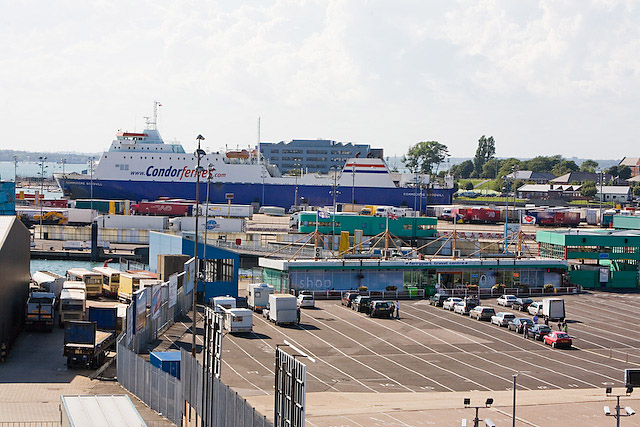
Portsmouth International Port is a major employer.

Ten per cent of Portsmouth's workforce is employed at Portsmouth Naval Dockyard, which is linked to the city's biggest industry, defence; the headquarters of BAE Systems Surface Ships is in the city. BAE's Portsmouth shipyard received construction work on the two new Queen Elizabeth-class aircraft carriers. A £100 million contract was signed to develop needed facilities for the vessels. However defence shipbuilding was ended in the city in favour of Glasgow during the 2014 Scottish Independence referendum. The Government was accused of making the decision to keep the more antiquated Glasgow shipyard over Portsmouth for political reasons as part of the pro union campaign. Ministers at the time did state shipbuilding would return to the city if Scotland left the UK. A minister for Portsmouth was established to help deal with the economic fallout of the decision. A ferry port handles passengers and cargo, and a fishing fleet of 20 to 30 boats operates out of Camber Quay, Old Portsmouth; most of the catch is sold at the quayside fish market.

The city is host to IBM's UK headquarters and Portsmouth was also the UK headquarters of Zurich Financial Services until 2007. City shopping is centred on Commercial Road and the 1980s Cascades Shopping Centre. The shopping centre has 185,000 to 230,000 visitors weekly. Redevelopment has created new shopping areas, including the Gunwharf Quays (the repurposed HMS Vernon shore establishment, with stores, restaurants and a cinema) and the Historic Dockyard, which caters to tourists and holds an annual Victorian Christmas market. Ocean Retail Park, on the north-eastern side of Portsea Island, was built in September 1985 on the site of a former metal-box factory.

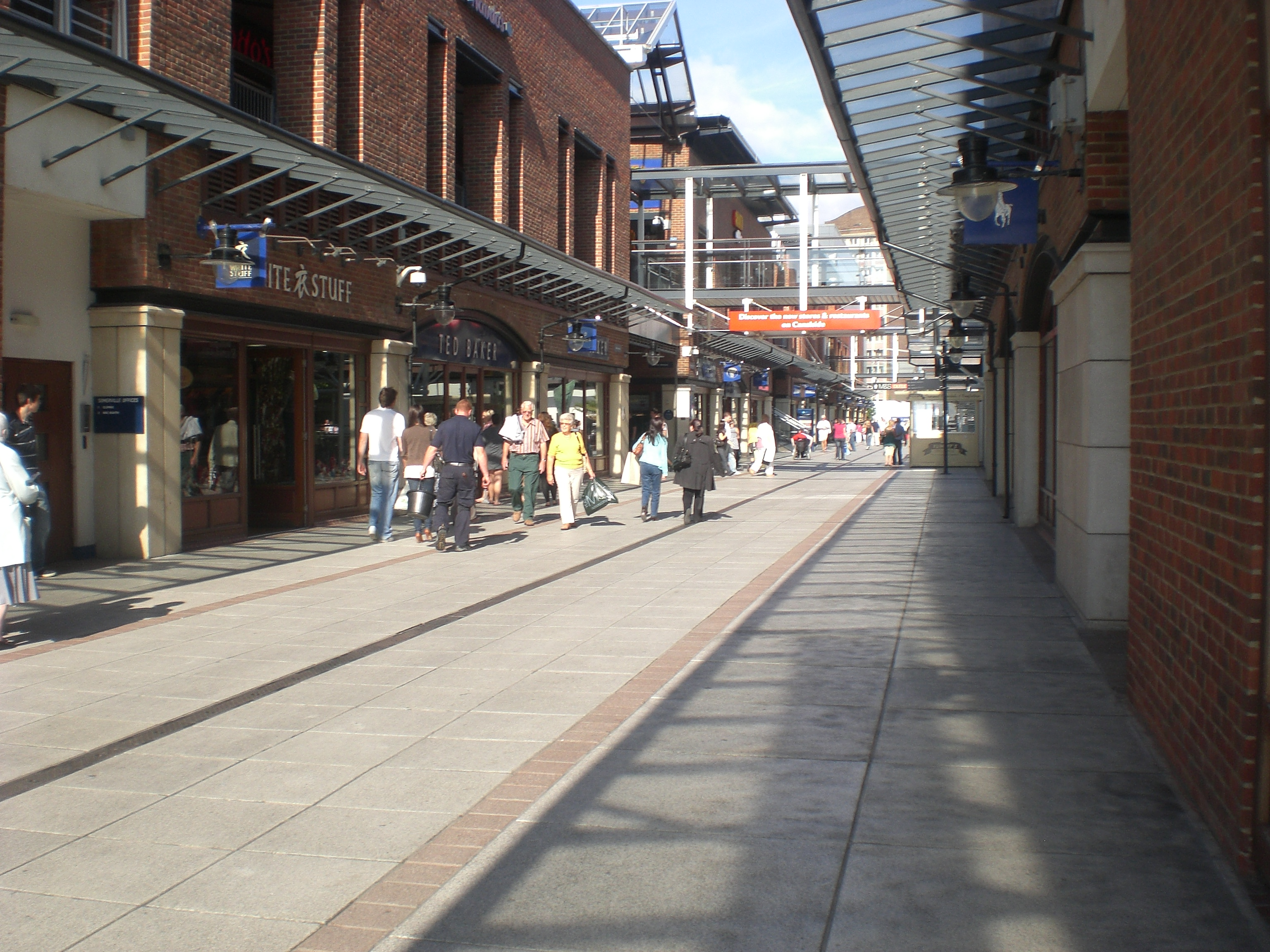
Gunwharf Quays shopping centre

Development of Gunwharf Quays continued until 2007, when the 330-foot-tall (101 m) No. 1 Gunwharf Quays residential tower was completed. The development of the former Brickwoods Brewery site included the construction of the 22-storey Admiralty Quarter Tower, the tallest in a complex of primarily low-rise residential buildings. Number One Portsmouth, a proposed 25-storey 330 feet (101 m) tower opposite Portsmouth & Southsea station, was announced at the end of October 2008. In August 2009, internal demolition of the existing building had begun. A high-rise student dormitory, nicknamed "The Blade", has begun construction on the site of the swimming baths at the edge of Victoria Park. The 300-foot (91 m) tower will be Portsmouth's second-tallest structure, after the Spinnaker Tower.

In April 2007, Portsmouth F.C. announced plans to move from Fratton Park to a new stadium on reclaimed land next to the Historic Dockyard. The £600 million mixed-use development, designed by Herzog & de Meuron, would include shops, offices and 1,500 harbourside apartments. The scheme was criticised for its size and location, and some officials said that it would interfere with harbour operations. The project was rejected by the city council due to the 2008 financial crisis.

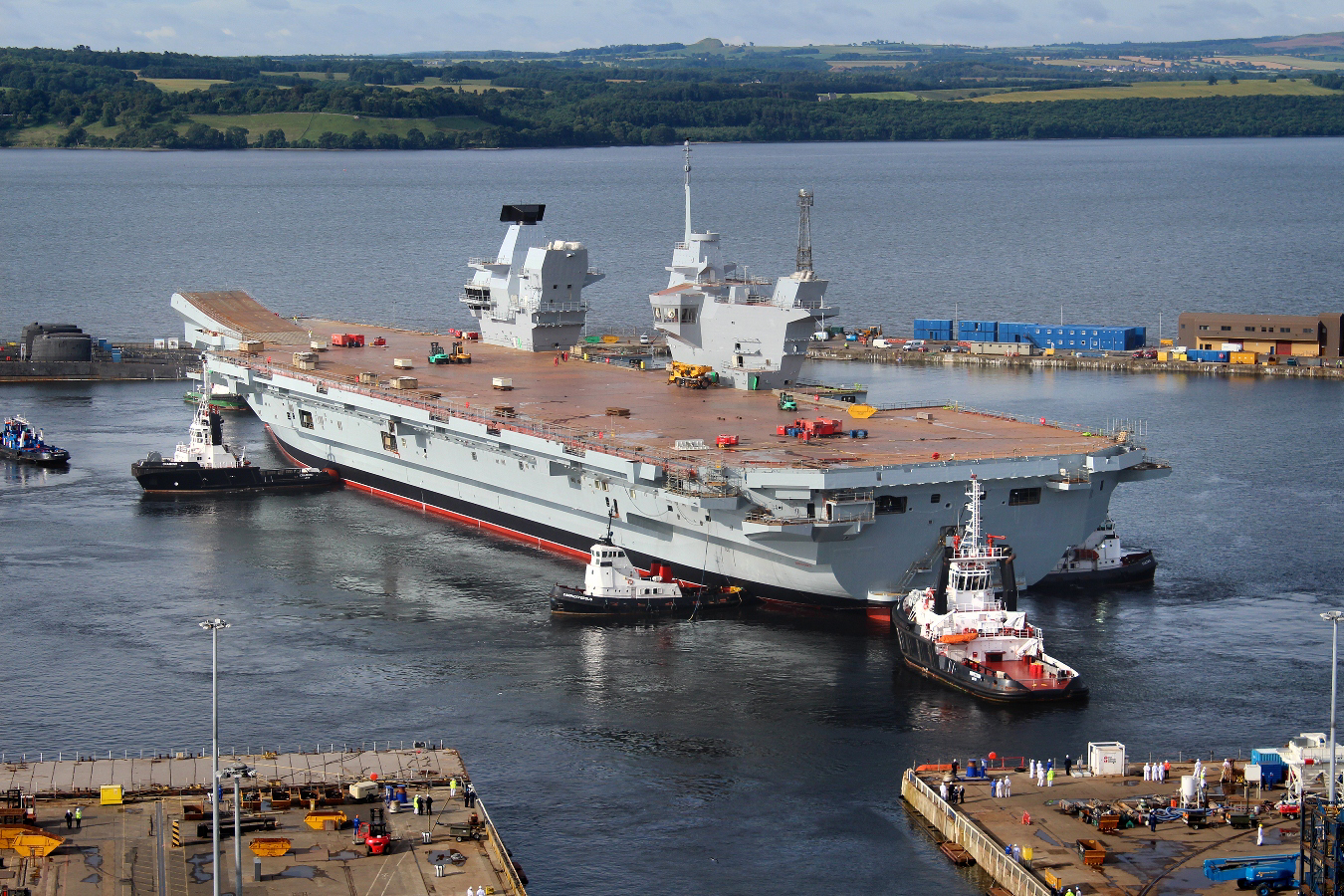
Portsmouth is the home port of the two Queen Elizabeth-class aircraft carriers.

Portsmouth's two Queen Elizabeth-class aircraft carriers, HMS Queen Elizabeth and HMS Prince of Wales, were ordered by defence secretary Des Browne on 25 July 2007. They were built in the Firth of Forth at Rosyth Dockyard and BAE Systems Surface Ships in Glasgow, Babcock International at Rosyth, and at HMNB Portsmouth. The government announced before the 2014 Scottish independence referendum that military shipbuilding would end in Portsmouth, with all UK surface-warship construction focused on the two older BAE facilities in Glasgow. The announcement was criticised by local politicians as a political decision to aid the referendum's "No" campaign.

== Culture ==
Portsmouth has several theatres. The New Theatre Royal in Guildhall Walk, near the city centre, specialises in professional drama. The restored Kings Theatre in Southsea features amateur musicals and national tours. The Groundlings Theatre, built in 1784, is housed at the Old Beneficial School in Portsea. New Prince's Theatre and Southsea's Kings Theatre were designed by Victorian architect Frank Matcham.

The city has three musical venues: the Guildhall, Wedgewood Rooms (which includes Edge of the Wedge, a smaller venue), and Portsmouth Pyramids Centre. Portsmouth Guildhall is one of the largest venues in South East England, with a seating capacity of 2,500. A concert series is presented at the Guildhall by the Bournemouth Symphony Orchestra. The Portsmouth Sinfonia approached classical music from a different angle during the 1970s, recruiting players with no musical training or who played an instrument new to them. The Portsmouth Summer Show is held at King George's Fields. The 2016 show held during the last weekend of April, featured cover bands such as the Silver Beatles, the Bog Rolling Stones, and Fleetingwood Mac.

A number of musical works are set in the city. H.M.S. Pinafore is a comic opera in two acts set in Portsmouth Harbour, with music by Arthur Sullivan and libretto by W.S. Gilbert. Portsmouth Point is a 1925 overture for orchestra by English composer William Walton, inspired by Thomas Rowlandson's etching of Portsmouth Point in Old Portsmouth. The overture has been recorded many times, and often played at the BBC Proms. John Cranko's 1951 ballet Pineapple Poll, which features music from Gilbert and Sullivan operettas and is loosely based on Gilbert's poem The Bumboat Woman's Story, is also set in Portsmouth.

Portsmouth hosts yearly remembrances of the D-Day landings, attended by veterans from Allied and Commonwealth nations. The city played a major role in the 50th D-Day anniversary in 1994; visitors included US President Bill Clinton, Australian Prime Minister Paul Keating, King Harald V of Norway, French President François Mitterrand, New Zealand Prime Minister Jim Bolger, Canadian Prime Minister Jean Chrétien, Prime Minister John Major, the Queen, and the Duke of Edinburgh. The 75th Anniversary of D-Day was similarly commemorated in the city. Prime Minister Theresa May led the event, and was joined by leaders of the US, Canada, Australia, France and Germany.

The annual Portsmouth International Kite Festival, organised by the city council and the Kite Society of Great Britain, celebrated its 25th anniversary in 2016.

Victorious Festival, the biggest metropolitan music festival in the UK takes place on Southsea Seafront in Portsmouth. It has been an annual event at this location since 2014. It is a large family-friendly music festival and has featured headliners including Stereophonics, Noel Gallagher's High Flying Birds, The Prodigy, and other prominent household names.

Portsmouth is frequently used as a filming location for television and film productions, especially the Historic Dockyard. Productions include Tommy, Tomorrow Never Dies (1997), the 2026 feature film Project Hail Mary, Mansfield Park and the Hollywood adaptation of Les Miserables.

In 2005, Portsmouth featured in the first series of ITV's Britain's Toughest Towns. As this documentary also indicated, Portsmouth has issues with gangs and anti-social behaviour.

Portsmouth is home to Paul Stone, the street artist known as My Dog Sighs. In 2021, for his INSIDE exhibition, he transformed a derelict ballroom into an immersive world inhabited by creatures that he called 'Quiet Little Voices'. In 2023 he celebrated 20 years as a street artist by hiding £30,000 of art across the city in a Free Art giveaway. He has been awarded an honorary doctorate by University of Portsmouth.

Portsmouth City Council made a bid on 28 November 2025 to become UK City of Culture 2029.

== Literature ==
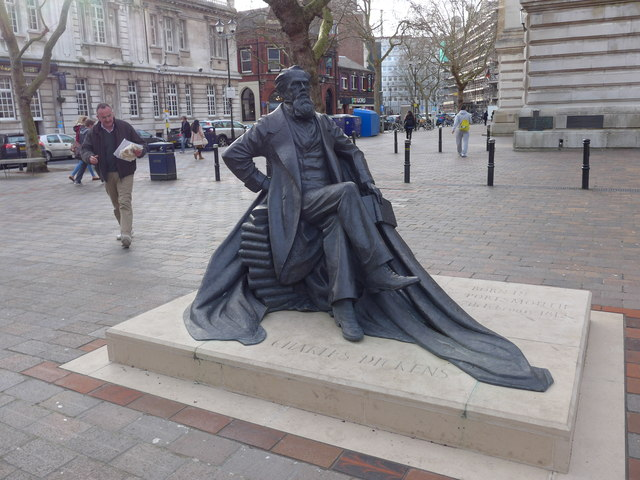
This statue to Charles Dickens in Portsmouth is one of only three statues to the historic writer in the world. Dickens wrote in his will that he did not want such statues built in his honour.

Portsmouth is the hometown of Fanny Price, the main character of Jane Austen's novel Mansfield Park, and most of its closing chapters are set there. Nicholas and Smike, the main protagonists of Charles Dickens' novel The Life and Adventures of Nicholas Nickleby, make their way to Portsmouth and become involved with a theatrical troupe. Portsmouth is most often the port from which Captain Jack Aubrey's ships sail in Patrick O'Brian's seafaring historical Aubrey-Maturin series. Portsmouth is the main setting of Jonathan Meades's 1993 novel Pompey. Since the novel was published, Meades has presented a TV programme documenting Victorian architecture in Portsmouth Dockyard.

Victorian novelist and historian Sir Walter Besant documented his 1840s childhood in By Celia's Arbour: A Tale of Portsmouth Town, precisely describing the town before its defensive walls were removed. Southsea (as Port Burdock) features in The History of Mr Polly by H. G. Wells, who describes it as "one of the three townships that are grouped around the Port Burdock naval dockyards". The resort is also the setting of the graphic novel The Tragical Comedy or Comical Tragedy of Mr. Punch by high fantasy author Neil Gaiman, who grew up in Portsmouth. A Southsea street was renamed The Ocean at the End of the Lane by the city council in honour of Gaiman's novel of the same name.

Crime novels set in Portsmouth and the surrounding area include Graham Hurley's D.I. Faraday/D.C. Winter novels and C. J. Sansom's Tudor crime novel, Heartstone; the latter refers to the warship Mary Rose and describes Tudor life in the town. Portsmouth Fairy Tales for Grown Ups, a collection of short stories, was published in 2014. The collection, set around Portsmouth, includes stories by crime novelists William Sutton and Diana Bretherick.

== Education ==
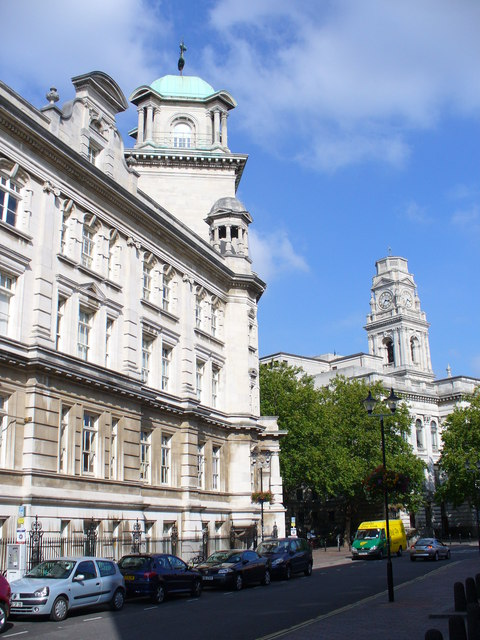
Park Building, University of Portsmouth

The University of Portsmouth was founded in 1992 as a new university from Portsmouth Polytechnic; in 2016, it had 20,000 students. The university was ranked among the world's top 100 modern universities in April 2015. In 2013, it had about 23,000 students and over 2,500 staff members. Several local colleges also award Higher National Diplomas, including Highbury College (specialising in vocational education), and Portsmouth College (which offers academic courses). Admiral Lord Nelson School and Miltoncross Academy were built in the late 1990s to meet the needs of a growing school-age population.

After the cancellation of the national building programme for schools, redevelopment halted. Two schools in the city were judged "inadequate", and 29 of its 63 schools were considered "no longer good enough" by Ofsted in 2009. Before it was taken over by Ark Schools and became Ark Charter Academy, St Luke's Church of England secondary school was one of England's worst schools in GCSE achievement. It was criticised by officials for its behavioural standards, with students reportedly throwing chairs at teachers. Since it became an academy in 2009, the school has improved; 69 per cent of its students achieved five GCSEs with grades of A* to C, including English and mathematics. The academy's intake policy is for a standard comprehensive school, drawing from the community rather than by religion.

Portsmouth Grammar School, the city's oldest independent school, was founded in 1732. Other independent schools include Portsmouth High School, and Mayville High School (founded in 1897).

== Landmarks ==
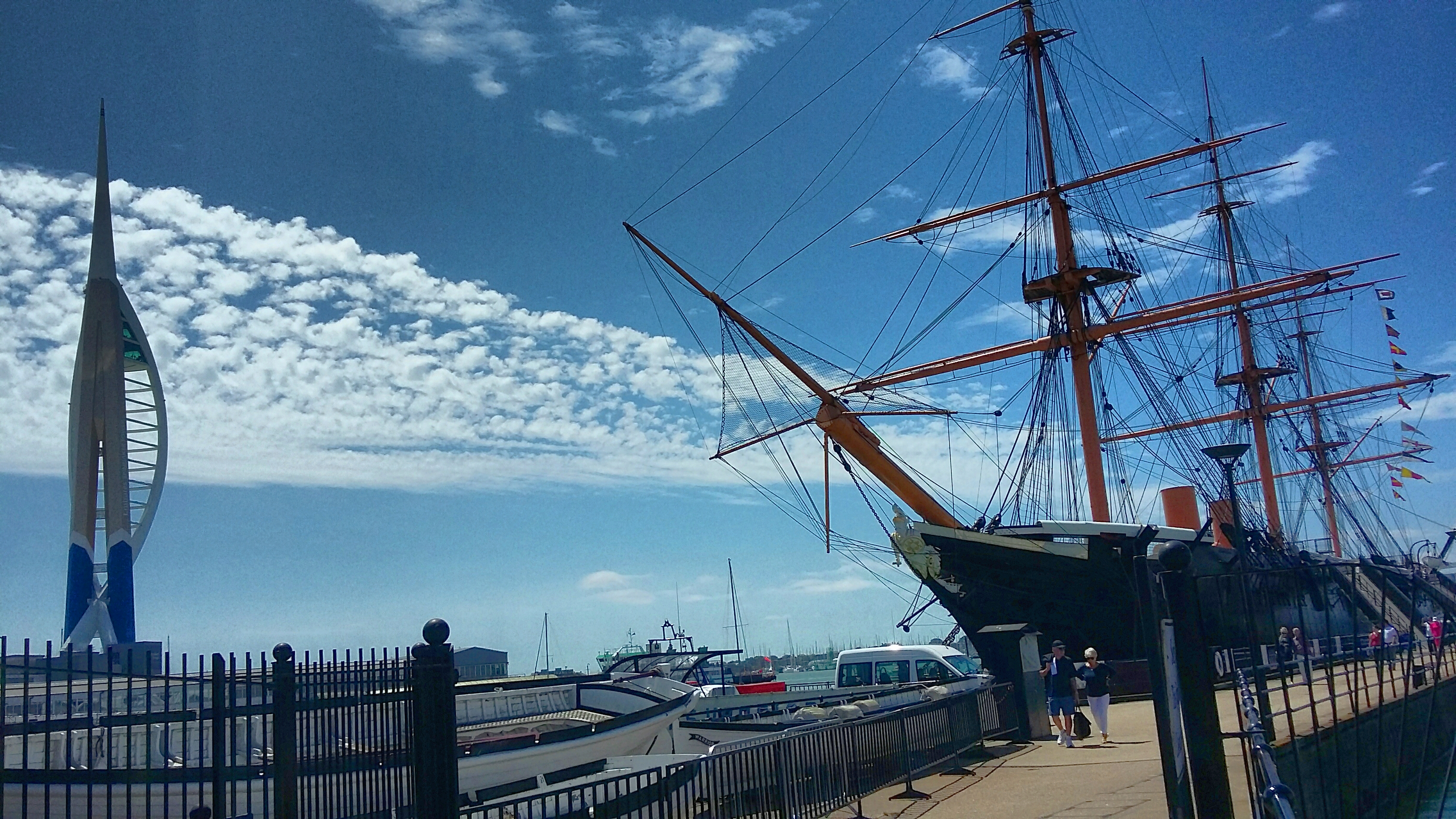
HMS Warrior (right) and the Spinnaker Tower are two of Portsmouth's main attractions.

Many of Portsmouth's former defences are now museums or event venues. Several Victorian-era forts on Portsdown Hill are tourist attractions; Fort Nelson, at its summit, is home to the Royal Armouries museum. Tudor-era Southsea Castle has a small museum, and much of the seafront defences leading to the Round Tower are open to the public. The castle was withdrawn from active service in 1960, and was purchased by Portsmouth City Council. The southern part of the Royal Marines' Eastney Barracks is now the Royal Marines Museum, and was opened to the public under the National Heritage Act 1983. The museum received a £14 million grant from the National Lottery Fund, and was scheduled to relocate to Portsmouth Historic Dockyard in 2019. The birthplace of Charles Dickens, at Mile End Terrace, is the Charles Dickens' Birthplace Museum; the four-storey red brick building became a Grade I listed building in 1953. Other tourist attractions include the Blue Reef Aquarium (with an "underwater safari" of British aquatic life) and the Cumberland House Natural History Museum, housing a variety of local wildlife.

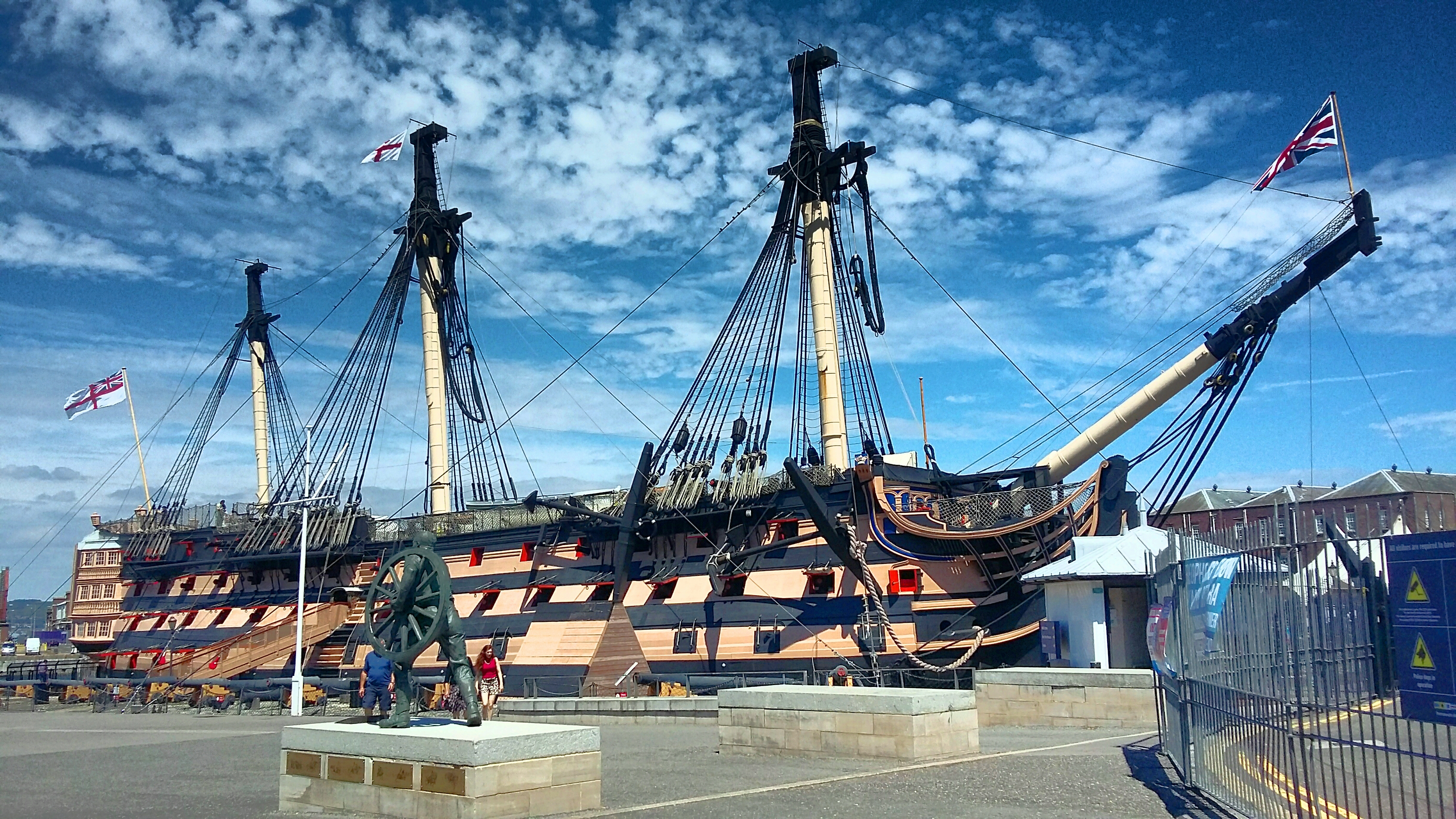
HMS Victory at Portsmouth Historic Dockyard, the world's oldest naval ship still in commission, is one of the city's most popular tourist attractions.

Most of the city's landmarks and tourist attractions are related to its naval history. They include the D-Day Story in Southsea, which contains the 83-metre-long (272 ft) Overlord Embroidery. Portsmouth is home to several well-known ships; Horatio Nelson's flagship HMS Victory, the world's oldest naval ship still in commission, is in the dry dock of Portsmouth Historic Dockyard. The Victory was placed in a permanent dry dock in 1922 when the Society for Nautical Research led a national appeal to restore her, and 22 million people have visited the ship. The remains of Henry VIII's flagship, Mary Rose, was rediscovered on the seabed in 1971. She was raised and brought to a purpose-built structure in Portsmouth Historic Dockyard in 1982. Britain's first iron-hulled warship, HMS Warrior, was restored and moved to Portsmouth in June 1987 after serving as an oil fuel pier at Pembroke Dock in Pembrokeshire for fifty years. The National Museum of the Royal Navy, in the dockyard, is sponsored by a charity that promotes research into the Royal Dockyard's history and archaeology. The dockyard hosts the Victorian Festival of Christmas, featuring Father Christmas in a traditional green robe, each November.

Portsmouth's long association with the armed forces is demonstrated by a large number of war memorials, including several at the Royal Marines Museum and a large collection of memorials related to the Royal Navy in Victoria Park. The Portsmouth Naval Memorial, in Southsea Common, commemorates the 24,591 British sailors who died during both World Wars and have no known grave. Designed by Sir Robert Lorimer, it was unveiled by George VI (then Duke of York) on 15 October 1924. In the city centre, the Guildhall Square Cenotaph contains the names of the fallen and is guarded by stone sculptures of machine gunners by Charles Sargeant Jagger. The west face of the memorial reads:

This memorial was erected by the people of Portsmouth in proud and loving memory of those who in the glorious morning of their days for England's sake lost all but England's praise. May light perpetual shine upon them.

The city has three cemeteries: Kingston, Milton Road, and Highland Road. Kingston Cemetery, opened in 1856, is in east Fratton. At 52 acres (21 ha), it is Portsmouth's largest cemetery and has about 400 burials a year. In February 2014, a ceremony celebrating the 180th anniversary of Portsmouth's Polish community was held at the cemetery. The approximately 25-acre (10 ha) Milton Road Cemetery, founded on 8 April 1912, has about 200 burials per year. There is a crematorium in Portchester.

Portsmouth Central Library in Guildhall Walk was built in 1976 in the brutalist style, designed by city architect Ken Norrish; it is also known as the Norrish Central Library. In 2026 it was chosen by Poet Laureate Simon Armitage as one of the venues for his annual library tour which in that year visited libraries in places with initials N-P, celebrating the 50th anniversary of the library and the centenary of Portsmouth's city status.

== Gunwharf Quays ==
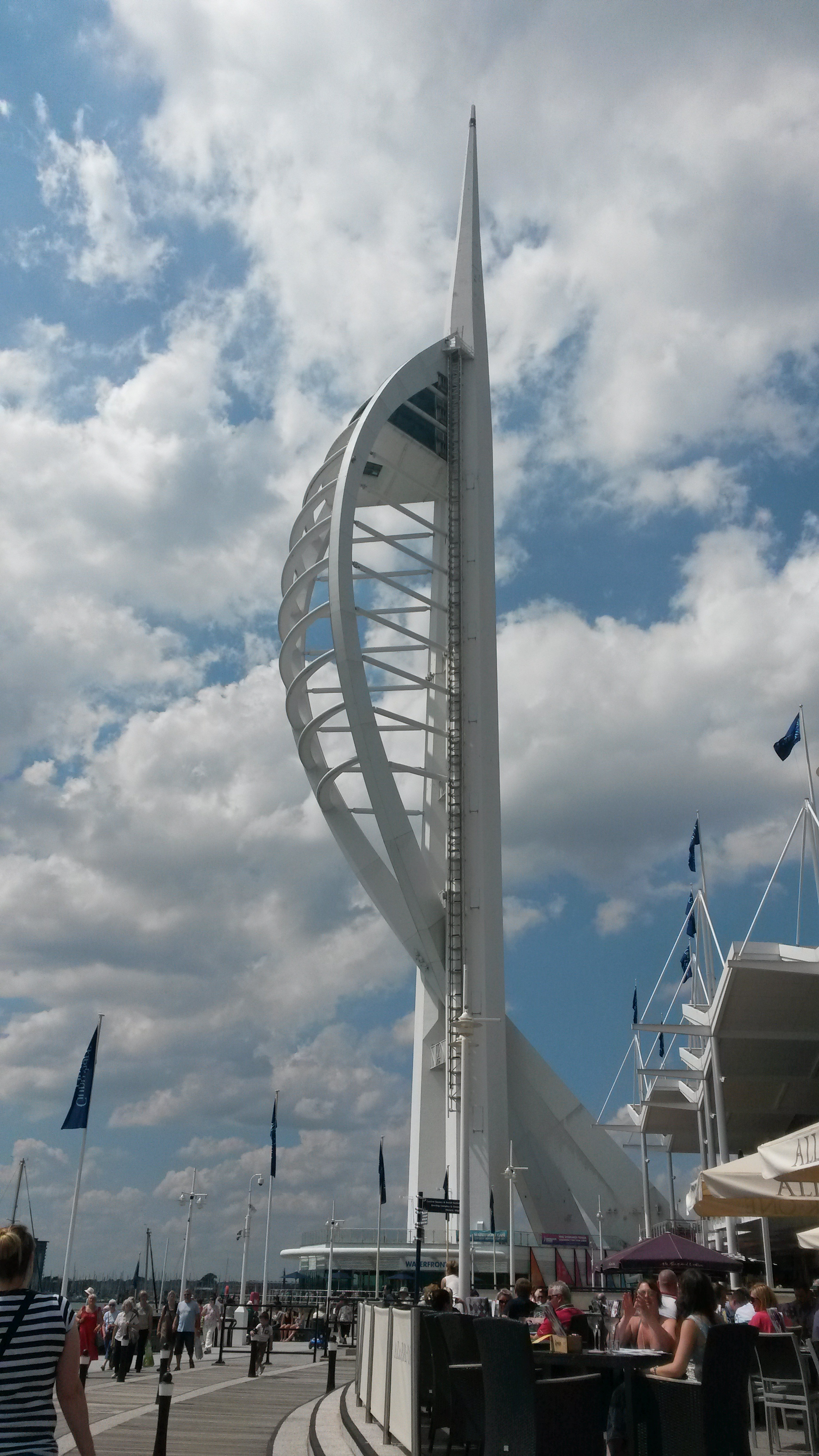
The Spinnaker Tower, seen from the waterfront at Gunwharf Quays

The naval shore establishment HMS Vernon contained the Royal Navy's arsenal; weapons and ammunition which would be taken from ships at its 'Gun Wharf' as they entered the harbour, and resupplied when they headed back to sea. The 1919 Southsea and Portsmouth Official Guide described the establishment as "the finest collections of weapons outside the Tower of London, containing more than 25,000 rifles". During the early nineteenth century, the 'Gunwharf' supplied the fleet with a "grand arsenal" of cannons, mortars, bombs, and ordnance. Although gunpowder was not provided due to safety concerns, it could be obtained at Priddy's Hard (near Gosport). An armoury sold small arms to soldiers, and the stone frigate also had blacksmith and carpenter shops for armourers. It was run by three officers: a viz (storekeeper), a clerk, and a foreman. By 1817, Gunwharf reportedly employed 5,000 men and housed the world's largest naval arsenal.

HMS Vernon was closed on 1 April 1996 and was redeveloped by Portsmouth City Council as Gunwharf Quays, a mixed residential and retail site with outlet stores, restaurants, pubs, cafés and a cinema. Construction of the Spinnaker Tower began in 2001, and was completed in the summer of 2005. The project exceeded its budget and cost £36 million, of which Portsmouth City Council contributed £11 million. The 560-foot (170 m) tower is visible at a distance of 23 miles (37 km) in clear weather, and its viewing platforms overlook the Solent (towards the Isle of Wight), the harbour and Southsea Castle. The tower weighs over 33,000 tonnes (32,000 long tons; 36,000 short tons).and has the largest glass floor in Europe.

== Southsea ==
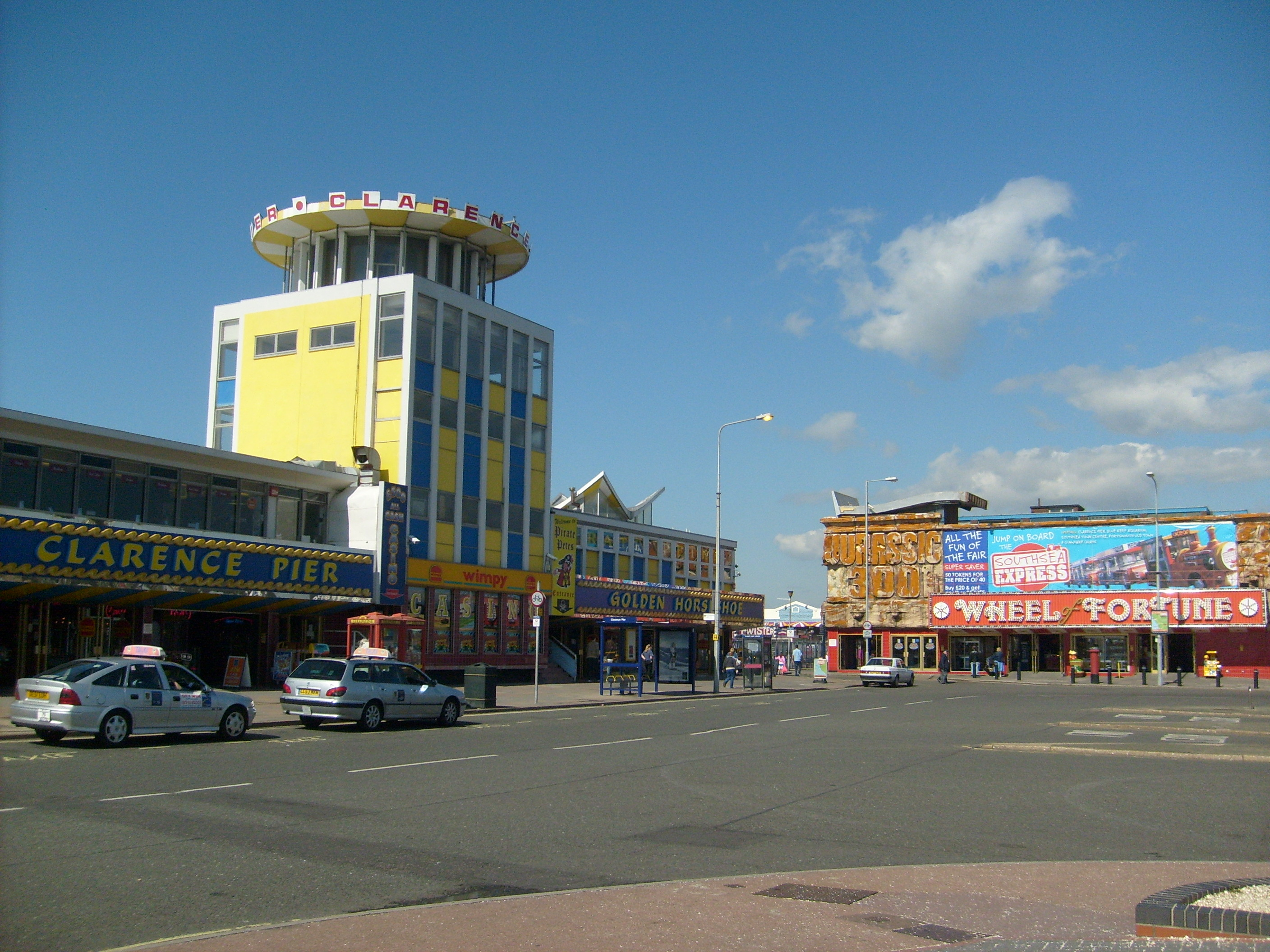
Southsea Promenade, which includes the Clarence Pier amusement park

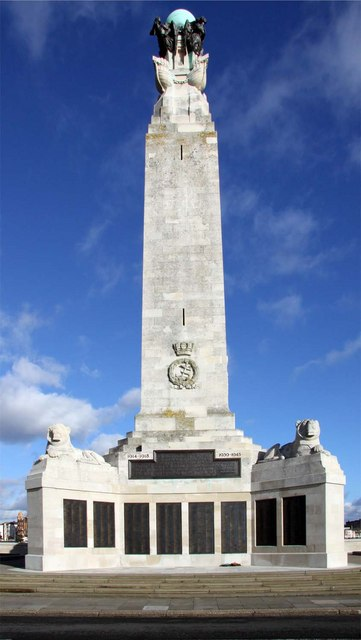
Portsmouth Naval Memorial in Southsea

Southsea is a seaside resort and residential area of Portsmouth located at the southern end of Portsea Island. Its name originates from Southsea Castle, a seafront castle built in 1544 by Henry VIII to help defend the Solent and Portsmouth Harbour. The area was developed in 1809 as Croxton Town; by the 1860s, the suburb of Southsea had expanded to provide working-class housing. Southsea developed as a seaside and bathing resort. A pump room and baths were built near the present-day Clarence Pier, and a complex was developed which included vapour baths, showers, and card-playing and assembly rooms for holiday-goers.

Clarence Pier, opened in 1861 by the Prince and Princess of Wales, was named after Portsmouth military governor Lord Frederick FitzClarence and was described as "one of the largest amusement parks on the south coast". South Parade Pier was built in 1878, and is among the United Kingdom's 55 remaining private piers. Originally a terminal for ferries travelling to the Isle of Wight, it was soon redeveloped as an entertainment centre. The pier was rebuilt after fires in 1904, 1967 and 1974 (during the filming of Tommy). Plans were announced in 2015 for a Solent Eye at Clarence Pier: a £750,000, 24-gondola Ferris wheel similar to the London Eye.

Southsea is dominated by Southsea Common, a 480-acre (190 ha) grassland created by draining the marshland next to the vapour baths in 1820. The common met the demands of the early-19th-century military for a clear firing range, and parallels the shore from Clarence Pier to Southsea Castle. A popular recreation area, it hosts a number of annual events which include carnivals, Christmas markets, and Victorian festivals. The common has a large collection of mature elm trees, believed to be the oldest and largest surviving in Hampshire and which have escaped Dutch elm disease due to their isolation. Other plants include the Canary Island date palms (Phoenix canariensis), some of Britain's largest, which have recently produced viable seed.

The resort of Southsea previously had its own dedicated light railway line; the Southsea Railway and its own terminus, East Southsea railway station. The Southsea Railway and station were closed in 1914, with the station's name merged into that of Portsmouth's main railway station name in 1925.

== Religion ==
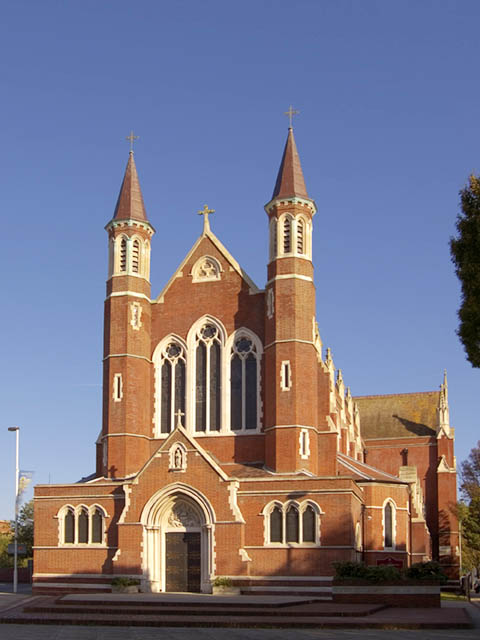
St John the Evangelist, the Roman Catholic cathedral built in 1882, is one of the city's two cathedrals.

Portsmouth has two cathedrals: the Anglican Cathedral of St Thomas in Old Portsmouth and the Roman Catholic Cathedral of St John the Evangelist. The city is one of 34 British settlements with a Roman Catholic cathedral. Portsmouth's first chapel, dedicated to Thomas Becket, was built by Jean de Gisors in the second half of the 12th century. It was rebuilt and developed into a parish church and an Anglican cathedral. Damaged during the 1642 Siege of Portsmouth, its tower and nave were rebuilt after the Restoration. Significant changes were made when the Diocese of Portsmouth was founded in 1927. It became a cathedral in 1932 and was enlarged, although construction was halted during the Second World War. The cathedral was re-consecrated before Queen Elizabeth The Queen Mother in 1991.

The Royal Garrison Church was founded in 1212 by Peter des Roches, Bishop of Winchester. After centuries of decay, it became an ammunition store in 1540. The 1662 marriage of Charles II and Catherine of Braganza was celebrated in the church, and large receptions were held there after the defeat of Napoleon at the 1813 Battle of Leipzig. In 1941, a firebomb fell on its roof and destroyed the nave. Although the church's chancel was saved by servicemen shortly after the raid, replacing the roof was deemed impossible due to the large amounts of salt solution absorbed by the stonework.

The Cathedral of St John the Evangelist was built in 1882 to accommodate Portsmouth's increasing Roman Catholic population, and replaced a chapel built in 1796 to the west. Before 1791, Roman Catholic chapels in towns with borough status were prohibited. The chapel opened after the Roman Catholic Relief Act 1791 was passed, and was replaced by the cathedral. It was constructed in phases; the nave was completed in 1882; the crossing in 1886, and the chancel by 1893. During the blitz, the cathedral was badly damaged when Luftwaffe bombing destroyed Bishop's House next door; it was restored in 1970, 1982, and 2001. The Roman Catholic Diocese of Portsmouth was founded in 1882 by Pope Leo XIII. (Note: Vatican policy in England at the time was to found sees in locations other than those used for Anglican cathedrals.) Smaller places of worship in the city include St Jude's Church in Southsea, St Mary's Church in Portsea, St Ann's Chapel in the naval base and the Portsmouth and Southsea Synagogue, one of Britain's oldest. Other places of worship include the Immanuel Baptist Church, Southsea; Trinity Methodist Church, Highland Road; Buckland United Reformed Church; The Oasis Centre Elim Penteostal Church; Jubilee Pentecostal Church, Somers Road; Kings Church Assemblies of God (St Peter's Somers Road); Family Church; Christ Central Church, John Pounds Centre; The Jami Mosque, Bradford Junction; The Sikh Gurudwara, Margate Road.

== Sport ==
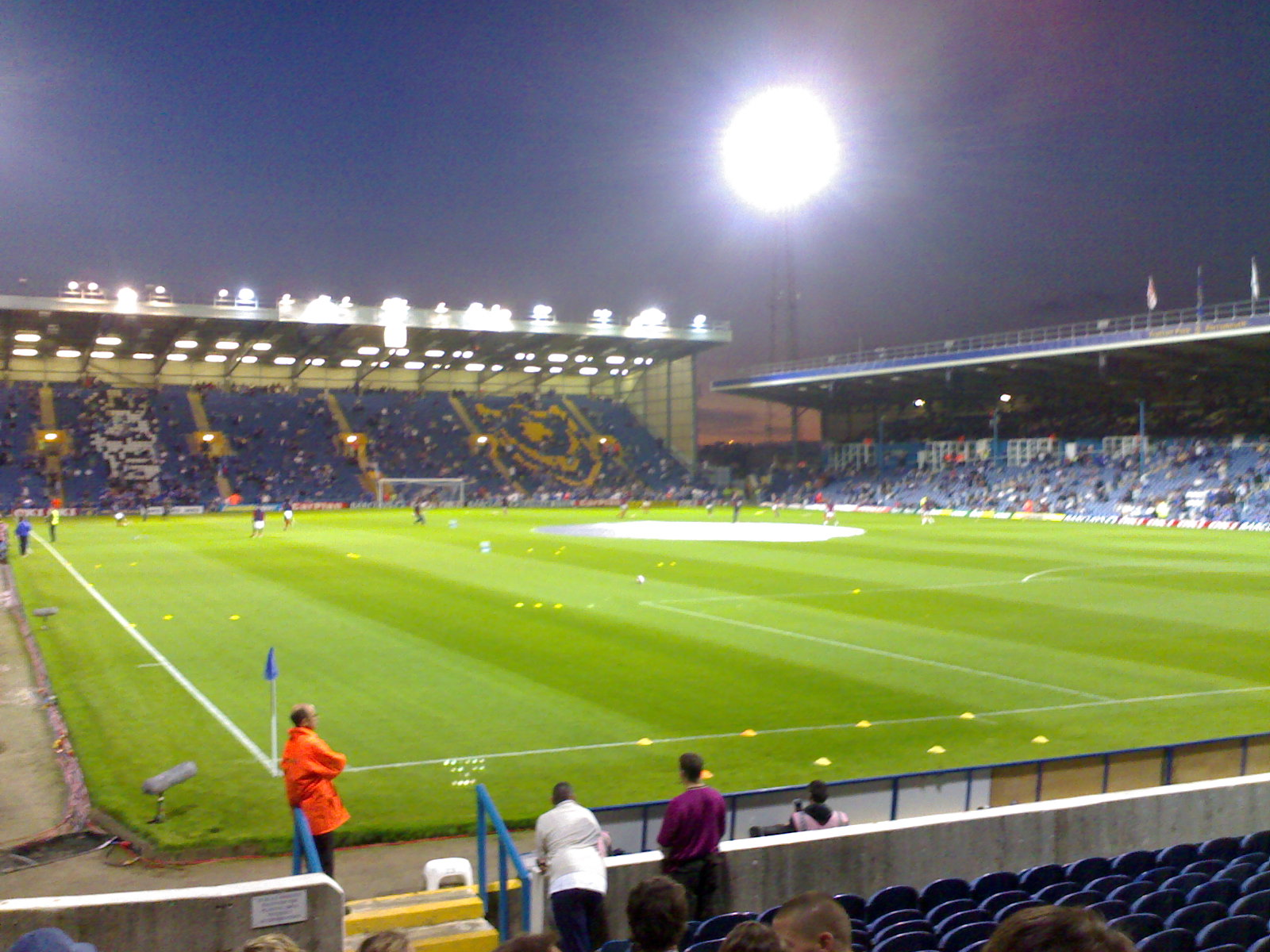
Fratton Park, home of Portsmouth F.C.

Portsmouth F.C. play their home games at Fratton Park. They have won two Football League titles (1949 and 1950), and won the FA Cup in 1939 and 2008. The club returned to the Premier League in 2003. They were relegated to the Championship in 2010 and, experiencing serious financial difficulties in February 2012, were relegated again to League One. The club was relegated the following year to League Two, the fourth tier of English football. Portsmouth F.C. was purchased in April 2013 by the Pompey Supporters Trust, becoming the largest fan-owned club in English Football history. In May 2017, as League Two champions, they were promoted to League One for the 2017–18 season. They won promotion back to the Championship as Champions of League One in May 2024.

Moneyfields F.C. have played in the Wessex Football League Premier Division since 1998. United Services Portsmouth F.C. (formerly known as Portsmouth Royal Navy) and Baffins Milton Rovers F.C. compete in Wessex League Division One; United Services was founded in 1962, and Baffins Milton Rovers in 2011. The rugby teams United Services Portsmouth RFC and Royal Navy Rugby Union play their home matches at the United Services Recreation Ground. Royal Navy Rugby Union play in the annual Army Navy Match at Twickenham.

Portsmouth began hosting first-class cricket at the United Services Recreation Ground in 1882, and Hampshire County Cricket Club matches were played there from 1895 to 2000. In 2000, Hampshire moved their home matches to the new Rose Bowl cricket ground in West End. Portsmouth is home to two hockey clubs: Portsmouth Hockey Club, based at the Admiral Lord Nelson School and United Services Portsmouth Hockey Club, based on Burnaby Road. Great Salterns Golf Club, established in 1926, is an 18-hole parkland course with two holes played across a lake; there are coastal courses at Hayling and the Gosport and Stokes Bay Golf Club. Boxing was a popular sport between 1910 and 1960, and a monument commemorating the city's boxing heritage was built in 2017.

== Transport ==
=== Roads ===
In March 2008, Portsmouth City Council became the first local authority in the UK to implement city-wide 20 miles per hour speed limit zones.

=== Ferries ===
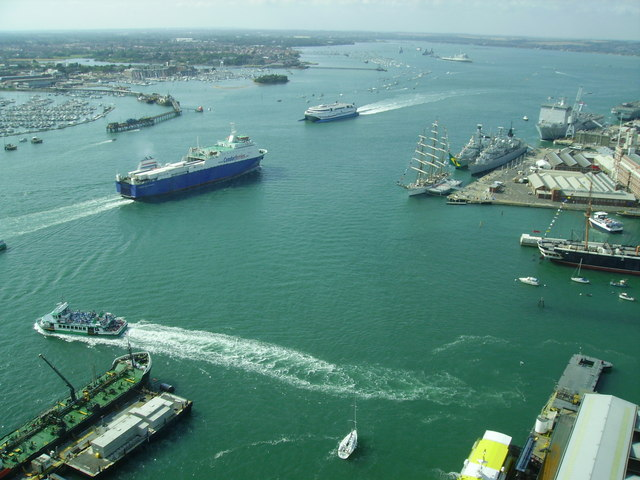
Ferries and cargo and military vessels in Portsmouth Harbour

Portsmouth Harbour has passenger-ferry links to Gosport and the Isle of Wight, with car-ferry service to the Isle of Wight nearby. Hovertravel, Britain's longest-standing commercial hovercraft service, begun in the 1960s, runs from near Clarence Pier in Southsea to Ryde, Isle of Wight. Portsmouth International Port has links to Caen, Cherbourg-Octeville, St Malo and Le Havre in France, Santander and Bilbao in Spain, and the Channel Islands. Ferry services from the port are operated by Brittany Ferries and DFDS Seaways.

On 18 May 2006, Trasmediterranea began service to Bilbao in competition with P&O's service. Its ferry, Fortuny, was detained in Portsmouth by the Maritime and Coastguard Agency for a number of safety violations. They were quickly corrected and the service was cleared for passengers on 23 May that year. Trasmediterránea discontinued its Bilbao service in March 2007, citing a need to deploy the Fortuny elsewhere. P&O Ferries ended their service to Bilbao on 27 September 2010 due to "unsustainable losses". The second-busiest ferry port in the UK (after Dover), Portsmouth handles about three million passengers per year.

=== Buses ===
Local bus services are provided by Stagecoach South and First Hampshire & Dorset to the city and its surrounding towns. Hovertravel and First Hampshire & Dorset operate a Hoverbus service from the city centre to Southsea Hovercraft Terminal and the Hard Interchange, near the seafront. National Express service from Portsmouth operates primarily from the Hard Interchange to Victoria Coach Station, Cornwall, Bradford, Birkenhead and Bristol.

=== Railways ===
Portsmouth has four railway stations on Portsea Island: Hilsea, Fratton, Portsmouth & Southsea and Portsmouth Harbour, with a fifth station at Cosham in the northern mainland suburb of Cosham, Portsmouth. Portsmouth previously had additional stations at Southsea, Farlington and Paulsgrove, but these were closed at various periods of the twentieth century.

The city of Portsmouth is on two direct South Western Railway routes to London Waterloo, via Guildford and via Basingstoke. There is a South Western Railway stopping service to Southampton Central and Great Western Railway service to Cardiff Central via Southampton, Salisbury, Bath Spa and Bristol. Southern has service to Brighton, Gatwick Airport, Croydon and London Victoria.

==== Closed stations ====
Southsea once had its own branch line, the Southsea Railway, which opened in 1885 between Southsea railway station and Fratton; it was closed in 1914 due to competition from tram services.

Farlington Halt railway station was built to serve Portsmouth Park racecourse, opening as Farlington Race Course on 26 June 1891. The racecourse was closed during World War One, but the station was retained to serve the ammunition dump put in its place. The station closed in 1917. Re-opened in 1922 until 1927. Under the Southern Railway, it re-opened as a general public halt in 1928 named Farlington Halt; however, this was short-lived as the station closed due to insufficient customers on 4 July 1937.

Paulsgrove Halt railway station was a railway station opened in 1928 to serve the adjacent Portsmouth Racecourse, a pony racing stronghold. The station was formerly located between Cosham and Portchester stations. Paulsgrove Halt was closed along with the racecourse when the land was acquired by the military in 1939, at the outbreak of World War II.

=== Air ===
Portsmouth Airport, with a grass runway, was in operation from 1932 to 1973. After it closed, housing (Anchorage Park) and industry were built on the site. The nearest airport is Southampton Airport in the Borough of Eastleigh, 19.8 miles (31.9 km) away. It has a South Western Railway rail connection, requiring a change at Southampton Central or Eastleigh. Heathrow and Gatwick are 65 miles (105 km) and 75 miles (121 km) away, respectively. Gatwick is linked by Southern train service to London Victoria station and Heathrow is linked by coach to Woking, which is on both rail lines to London Waterloo and the London Underground. Heathrow is linked to Portsmouth by National Express coaches.

=== Former canal ===
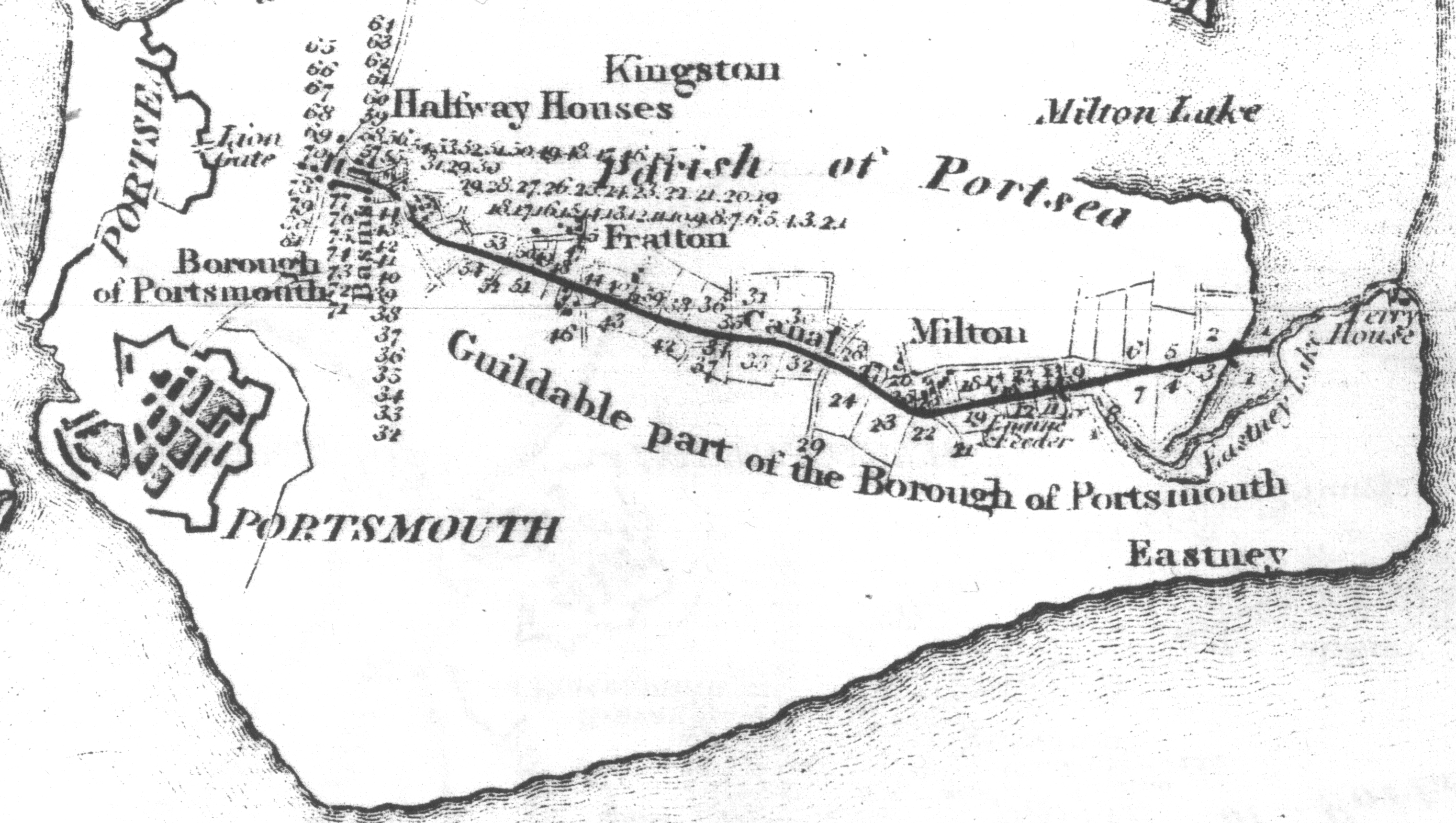
A map of the planned route of Portsmouth and Arundel Canal across Portsea Island from 1815

The Portsmouth and Arundel Canal ran between the towns and was built in 1823 by the Portsmouth & Arundel Navigation Company. Never financially successful, and found to be contaminating Portsea Island fresh water wells, it was abandoned in 1855 and the company was wound up in 1888. The canal was part of a larger scheme for a secure inland canal route from London to Portsmouth, allowing boats to avoid the English Channel. It had three sections: a pair of ship canals (one on Portsea Island and one to Chichester) and a barge canal from Ford on the River Arun to Hunston, where it joined the canal's Chichester section.

The route through Portsea Island began from a basin formerly located on Arundel Street and cut through Landport, Fratton and Milton, ending at the eastern end of Locksway Road in Milton (where a set of lock gates accessed Langstone and Chichester Harbours. After the island route was closed, the drained canal-bed sections through Landport and Fratton were reused for the Portsmouth Direct line, or filled-in to surface level to form a new main road route to Milton, named Goldsmith Avenue.

The brick-lined canal walls are clearly visible between the Fratton and Portsmouth & Southsea railway stations. The canal lock entrance at Locksway Road in Milton is east of the Thatched House pub.

== Media ==
Portsmouth, Southampton and their adjacent towns are served primarily by programming from the Rowridge and Chillerton Down transmitters on the Isle of Wight, although the transmitter at Midhurst can substitute for Rowridge. Portsmouth was one of the first cities in the UK to have a local TV station (MyTV), although the Isle of Wight began local television broadcasting in 1998. In November 2014, That's Solent was introduced as part of a nationwide roll-out of local Freeview channels in south-central England. The stations broadcast from Rowridge.

BBC local radio station that broadcast to the city is BBC Radio Solent on 96.1 FM. According to RAJAR, popular radio stations include regional Greatest Hits Radio South and Global Radio's Heart South and Capital South. Easy Radio South Coast broadcasts from Southampton to the city on 107.4 MHz, and the non-profit community station, Express FM, broadcasts on 93.7. Patients at Queen Alexandra Hospital (Portsmouth's primary hospital) receive local programming from Portsmouth Hospital Broadcasting, which began in 1951. When the first local commercial radio stations were licensed during the 1970s by the Independent Broadcasting Authority (IBA), Radio Victory received the first licence and began broadcasting in 1975. In 1986, the IBA increased the Portsmouth licence to include Southampton and the Isle of Wight. The new licence went to Ocean Sound (later known as Ocean FM), with studios in Fareham; Ocean FM became Heart Hampshire. For the city's 800th birthday in 1994, Victory FM broadcast for three 28-day periods over 18 months. It was purchased by TLRC, who relaunched the station in 2001 as the Quay; Portsmouth Football Club became a stakeholder in 2007, selling it in 2009.

Portsmouth's daily newspaper is The News, founded in 1873 and previously known as the Portsmouth Evening News. The Journal, a free weekly newspaper, is published by News publisher Johnston Press.

== Notable people ==
Portsmouth has been home to a number of famed authors; Charles Dickens, whose works include A Christmas Carol, Great Expectations, Oliver Twist and A Tale of Two Cities, was born there. Arthur Conan Doyle, author of the Sherlock Holmes stories, practised medicine in the city and played in goal for the amateur Portsmouth Association Football Club. Rudyard Kipling (poet and author of The Jungle Book) and H. G. Wells, author of The War of the Worlds and The Time Machine, lived in Portsmouth during the 1880s. Novelist and historian Walter Besant, author of By Celia's Arbour, A Tale of Portsmouth Town, was born in Portsmouth. Historian Frances Yates, known for her work on Renaissance esotericism, was born in the city.Francis Austen, brother of Jane Austen, briefly lived in the area after graduating from Portsmouth Naval Academy. Contemporary literary figures include social critic, journalist and author Christopher Hitchens, who was born in Portsmouth. Nevil Shute moved to the city in 1934 when he relocated his aircraft company, and his former home is in Southsea. Fantasy author Neil Gaiman grew up in Purbrook and Southsea.

Industrial Revolution engineer Isambard Kingdom Brunel was born in Portsmouth. His father, Marc Isambard Brunel, worked for the Royal Navy and developed the world's first production line to mass-produce pulley blocks for ship rigging. James Callaghan, British prime minister from 1976 to 1979, was born and raised in Portsmouth. Son of a Protestant Northern Irish petty officer in the Royal Navy, Callaghan was the only person to hold all four Great Offices of State: foreign secretary, home secretary, chancellor and prime minister. John Pounds, the founder of ragged schools (which provided free education to working-class children), lived in Portsmouth and founded England's first ragged school there.

Comedian and actor Peter Sellers was born in Southsea, and Arnold Schwarzenegger briefly lived and trained in Portsmouth. Other actors who were born or lived in the city include EastEnders actresses Emma Barton and Lorraine Stanley, comedienne and singer Audrey Jeans, and Bollywood actress Geeta Basra. Internationally-renowned street artist My Dog Sighs lives in the city and his murals can be seen on many walls in the city. Cryptozoologist Jonathan Downes was born in Portsmouth, and lived there for a time. Ant Middleton, former SBS, current television presenter and author was born in Portsmouth. Helen Duncan, the last person to be imprisoned under the 1735 Witchcraft Act, was arrested in Portsmouth.

Notable sportspeople include Commonwealth Games gold medalist Michael East, Olympic medallist in cycling Rob Hayles, former British light-heavyweight boxing champion Tony Oakey, Olympic medallist Alan Pascoe as well as professional footballer Mason Mount. Single-handed yachtsman Alec Rose, 2003 World Aquatics Championships gold medallist Katy Sexton, and Olympic medallist Roger Black were also born in the city. Jamshid bin Abdullah of Zanzibar, the last constitutional monarch of the island state, lived in exile in Portsmouth with his wife and six children, prior to resettling in his ancestral land of Oman.

== Twin towns and sister cities ==
Sources:

- Caen, Normandy, France
- Duisburg, North Rhine-Westphalia, Germany
- Haifa, Haifa District, Israel
- Halifax, Nova Scotia, Canada
- Lakewood, Jefferson County, Colorado, United States
- Maizuru, Kyoto Prefecture, Japan
- Portsmouth, Virginia, United States
- Portsmouth, Rockingham County, New Hampshire, United States
- Sydney, New South Wales, Australia
- Sylhet, Bangladesh
- Zhanjiang, Guangdong, China
- Valletta, Malta

== Freedom of the City ==
According to the Portsmouth City Council website, the following individuals and military units have received the Freedom of the City in Portsmouth:

=== Individuals ===
- Baron Macnaghten (1895)
- Field Marshal Lord Roberts of Kandahar (1898)
- Sir John Baker (1901)
- Lieutenant General Sir Frederick Fitzwygram (1901)
- Sir William Pink (1905)
- Sir T. Scott Foster (1906)
- Duke of Connaught and Strathearn (1921)
- F. G. Foster (1924)
- David Lloyd George (1924)
- Prince of Wales (1926)
- Major General J. E. B. Seely (1927)
- Sir William Joynson-Hicks (1927)
- Frank J. Privett (1928)
- Sir Harold R. Pink (1928)
- Admiral Sir William James (1942)
- Field Marshal Lord Montgomery of Alamein (1946)
- Sir Winston Churchill (1950)
- Albert Johnson (1966)
- J. P. D. Lacey (1966)
- Sir Alec Rose (1968)
- Admiral of the Fleet Lord Mountbatten of Burma (1976)
- Prince of Wales (1979)
- Lord Callaghan of Cardiff (1991)
- Princess of Wales (1992)
- Lord Judd of Portsea (1995)
- Lady Margaret Daley (1996)
- Josef Krings (1997)
- Ian G. Gibson (2002)
- Milan Mandarić (2003)
- Sir Alfred Blake (2003)
- Brian Kidd (2003), former Head of Parks and Gardens in Portsmouth
- Harry Redknapp (2008)
- Syd Rapson (2016)
- Alan Knight MBE (2025)

=== Military units ===
- Royal Hampshire Regiment (1950)
- Royal Marines (1959)
- Portsmouth Command of the Royal Navy (1965)
- Princess of Wales's Royal Regiment (1992)
- HMS King Alfred, RNR (2003)
- HMS Endurance, RN (2007)

=== Organisations and groups ===
- Essential Workers of Portsmouth: 16 March 2021 (service will be held in May 2021).
- Royal Naval Association: 8 December 2021.
- Royal Marines Association (Portsmouth Branch): 8 December 2021.
- Association of Wrens and Women of the Royal Naval Services: 8 December 2021.
- Pompey in the Community: 29 March 2022.
- Life House: 15 December 2022.
- The Southern Co-operative Limited: 10 July 2023.

== See also ==
- List of tallest buildings and structures in Portsmouth
- List of twin towns and sister cities in the United Kingdom
- Portsmouth power station
