= List of places of worship in Portsmouth =

Churches in England

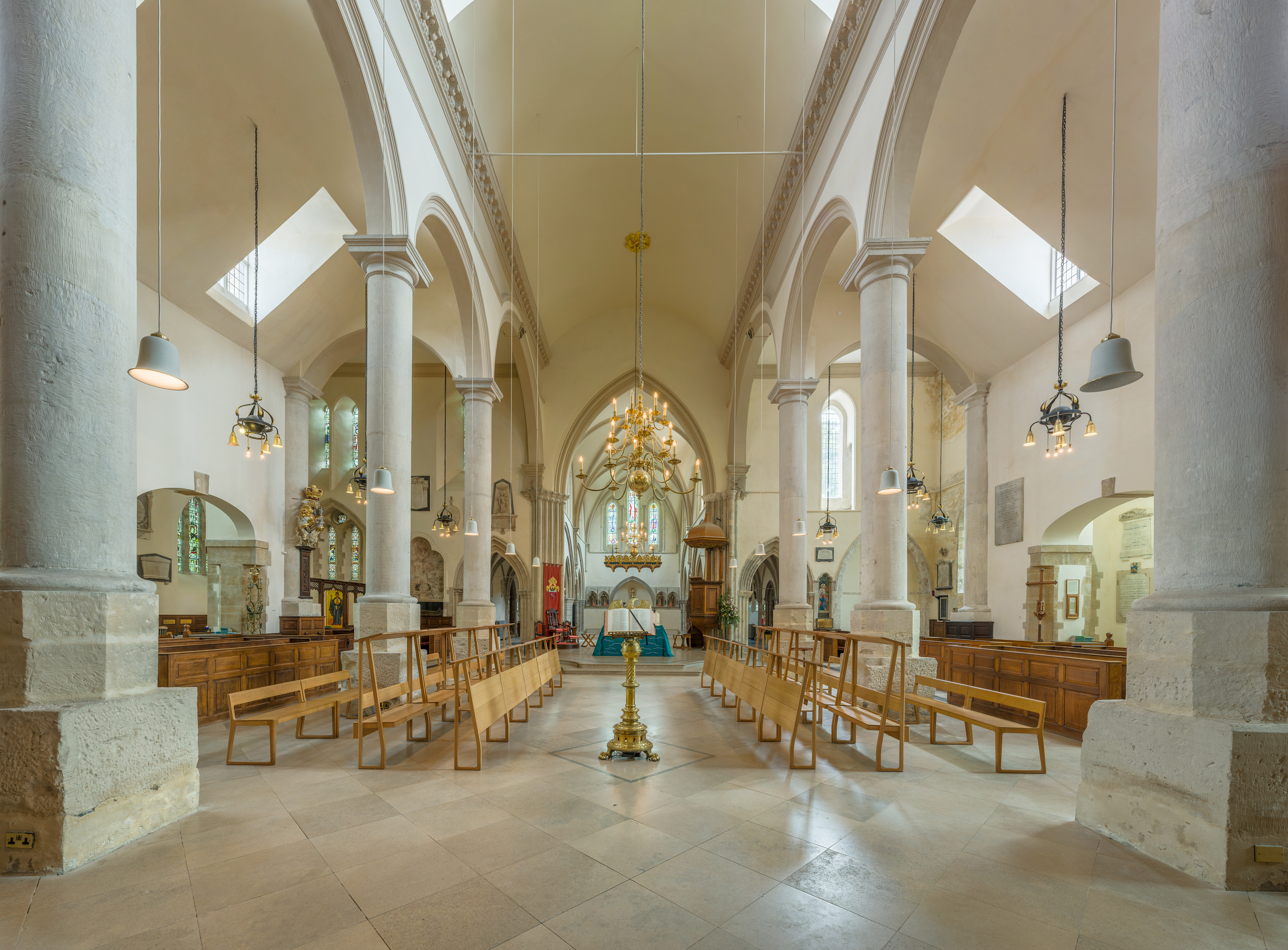
Portsmouth Cathedral (quire pictured) was built in the 1180s as a memorial to St Thomas of Canterbury and became a parish church in the 14th century.

The English port city of Portsmouth has a wide variety of places of worship representing many Christian denominations and other faith groups. There were 102 in the city: 77 churches, chapels, halls and meeting rooms for various Christian groups, three mosques, a synagogue and a gurdwara were in use, and a further 20 buildings no longer serve a religious function but survive in alternative uses. Portsmouth is in the southeast of the traditional and ceremonial county of Hampshire, although it is now administered as a separate unitary authority; it spreads across the whole of Portsea Island and on to the mainland to the north, and is the most densely populated city in the United Kingdom. The city area is wholly urban, but most of its growth occurred between the 18th and 20th centuries, and very few churches were founded before this. Portsmouth is the seat of two dioceses and therefore has two cathedrals: the mother church of Anglican Diocese of Portsmouth is the Cathedral Church of St Thomas of Canterbury, founded in the 12th century as a parish church, while the Roman Catholic Diocese of Portsmouth is based at the Cathedral of St John the Evangelist, founded in 1880.

The 2011 United Kingdom census reported that just over half of residents are Christian. The largest number of churches in the city belong to the Church of England—the country's Established Church—but many other denominations have worshipped continuously in Portsmouth for centuries. Roman Catholics established their first chapel in the 1790s and now have six churches in the city as well as the cathedral. Among Nonconformist groups, the first Baptist church opened before 1700; Methodism emerged in the 18th century, its Wesleyan branch being particularly strong locally; a Unitarian church was founded more than 300 years ago; and all the United Reformed congregations in the city can trace their roots back to a chapel of 1754. Other denominations and groups represented in the city include Christian Scientists, Jehovah's Witnesses, Celestial church of Christ Portsmouth Parish, various Pentecostal groups and Plymouth Brethren.

Historic England has awarded listed status to 21 current and three former places of worship in Portsmouth. A building is defined as "listed" when it is placed on a statutory register of buildings of "special architectural or historic interest" in accordance with the Planning (Listed Buildings and Conservation Areas) Act 1990. The Department for Digital, Culture, Media and Sport, a Government department, is responsible for this; Historic England, a non-departmental public body, acts as an agency of the department to administer the process and advise the department on relevant issues. There are three grades of listing status. Grade I, the highest, is defined as being of "exceptional interest"; Grade II* is used for "particularly important buildings of more than special interest"; and Grade II, the lowest, is used for buildings of "special interest". Portsmouth City Council also grants locally listed status to buildings of local architectural or historic interest which are not on the statutory register; ten current and three former places of worship have this status.

== Overview of the city and its places of worship ==
Portsmouth is situated in southeast Hampshire on the south coast of England.

Urban development on Portsea Island started in the 12th century, when "a flourishing little town" developed around Portsmouth Harbour and Southwick Priory founded a chapel—the present Cathedral Church of St Thomas of Canterbury. In 1212, Domus Dei, an almshouse, hospice and chapel which was later used as the Royal Garrison Church, was established nearby. Until the 1750s the only other church on Portsea Island was the original parish church of St Mary in present-day Kingston; other medieval churches were found at Widley, Wymering and Farlington, which were outside the Portsmouth boundary until the 20th century. St Thomas of Canterbury was parished in the 14th century, and St Mary's gradually became ruinous. Nevertheless it retained its status as parish church of the rest of Portsea Island outside the old town, and only two other Anglican churches were built before 1800: St George's and St John the Evangelist's. Both were proprietary chapels: the former opened in 1754 as a chapel of ease to St Mary's, (Note: It became a parish church in 1865.) and St John the Evangelist's served as "the stronghold of [Anglican] Evangelism" and Low church tradition from its opening in 1789 until its destruction by World War II bombs in 1941.

The great expansion of the city's population in the 19th and early 20th centuries prompted the construction of many new Anglican churches and mission halls across the whole island. Some of the architecture was "dull and pedestrian", and many were built cheaply, but some were on a more ambitious and grand scale. More than 20 Anglican churches opened between 1800 and 1914, and at the end of that period further impetus was given by the establishment of the Bishop of Winchester's "Six Churches Fund" to provide money to build or rebuild more: this was responsible for what Nikolaus Pevsner described as the "remarkable outburst of building in a variety of styles" at that time. Also of the pre-World War II era is "one of [the] most famous and original churches" by Ninian Comper, the architecturally eclectic St Philip's Church (1936–38), in the unlikely setting of the "dead-end suburbia" of Cosham's Highbury estate. Many Anglican churches were damaged or destroyed during World War II, and most were not replaced. The "beautiful and sensitive" restoration of the Church of the Holy Spirit in the 1950s (Note: Built in 1904 and originally dedicated to St Matthew; it was rededicated upon reopening.) brought the 150-year era of intensive churchbuilding in the city to an end: as congregations and financial resources have reduced, more churches have closed or been replaced by smaller buildings (as at St Mark's, North End) or adapted into multi-purpose community facilities (as at St Cuthbert's, Copnor).

=== Roman Catholics ===
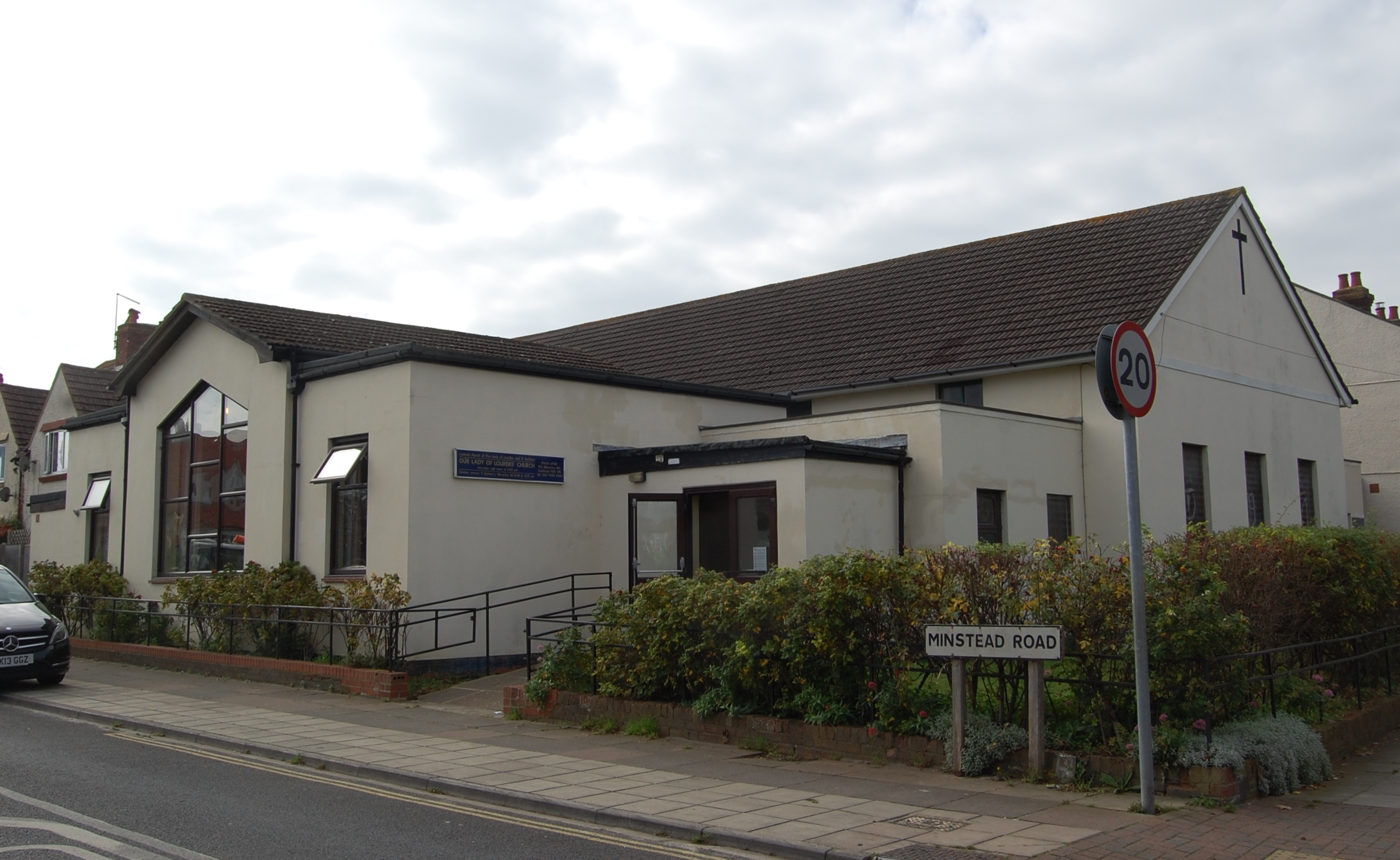
The Catholic church at Eastney is a prefabricated 1950s building.

In the 18th century, Portsea Island's few Roman Catholics travelled to Gosport to attend Mass, crossing Portsmouth Harbour in a rowing boat, or to Havant. Both of these missions were in private chapels in houses belonging to Catholic families, as churches for public worship could not be built until the passing of the Roman Catholic Relief Act 1791. In that year or 1792 a temporary chapel opened in central Portsmouth. Four years later a permanent church was built behind houses on Prince George Street. As the population grew it was enlarged in the mid-19th century, galleries were added and a schoolroom was built. It was superseded by the present cathedral, but survived in commercial use until 1965. The present Cathedral of St John the Evangelist was founded in 1880 and was raised to cathedral status two years later when the Diocese of Portsmouth was created. Two years later a mission dedicated to Our Lady and St Swithun was founded in Southsea, and a tin tabernacle was erected to serve as a chapel of ease. The present St Swithun's Church replaced it in 1901. In 1893 a second mission was established in the North End district, and Corpus Christi became Portsmouth's third Catholic church. St Joseph's Church was built in 1914 to serve the Copnor district, where Mass had been celebrated since 1908, and a church opened in a converted garage in 1937 in Eastney. The permanent replacement, a prefabricated building dedicated to Our Lady of Lourdes, opened in 1956. On the mainland, churches were built in Cosham (1928) and on the Paulsgrove estate (1970). Other churches in the city with a Catholic tradition are St Agatha's Church at Landport (originally Anglican, but now affiliated with the Roman Catholic Church through the Personal Ordinariate of Our Lady of Walsingham) and the Church of Our Lady Help of Christians in Kingston, part of the traditionalist Society of Saint Pius X.

=== Methodists ===
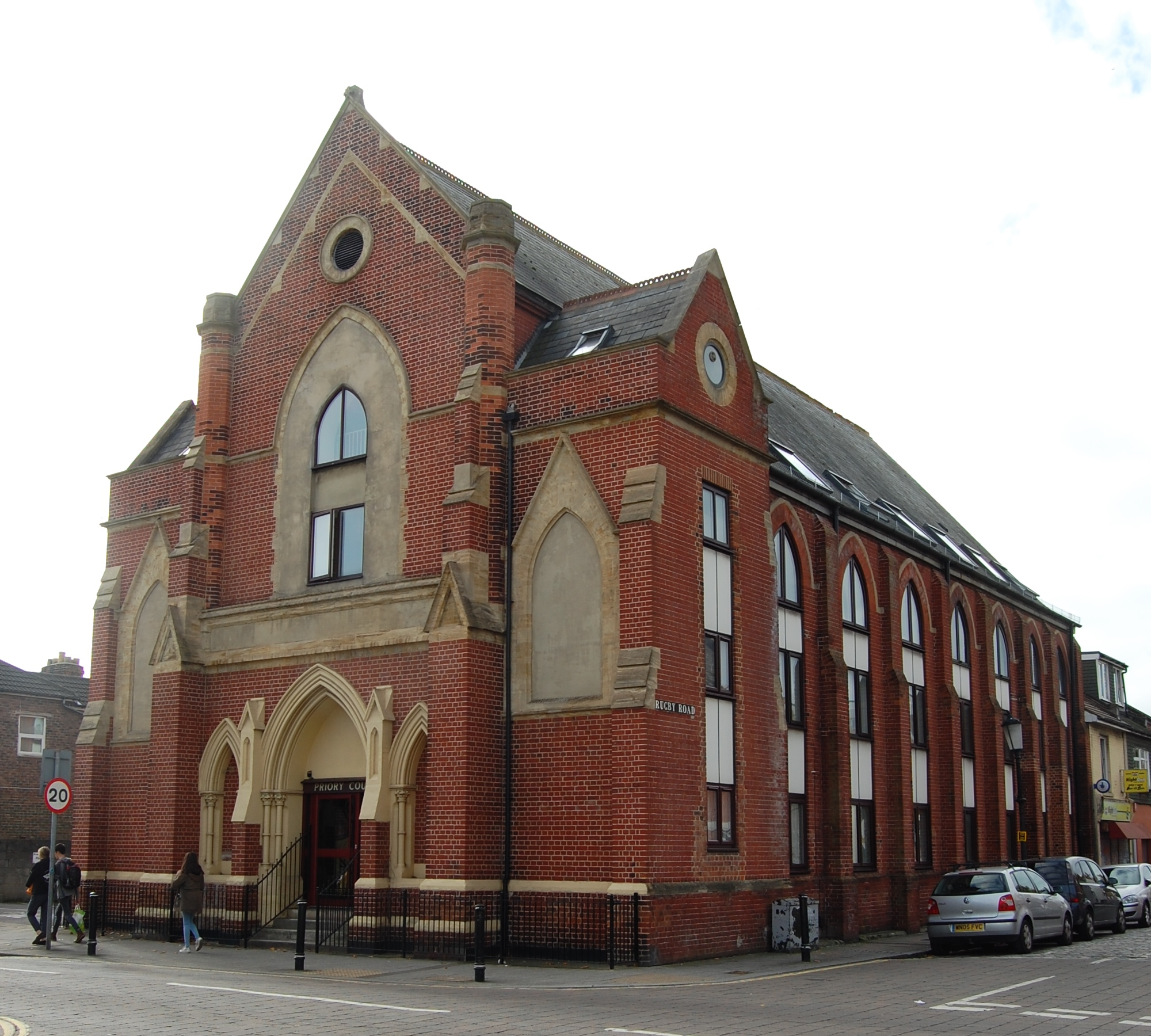
Former Methodist churches in Portsmouth include the Fawcett Road chapel of 1892.

Methodism "has had an important influence on the religious and social life of Portsmouth" since the 18th century. As in many other parts of the country, the three main branches of Methodism were represented: in 1910, the 20 chapels within the city boundaries consisted of 12 for Wesleyans and four each for Primitive Methodists and Bible Christians. John Wesley visited Portsmouth 22 times in the 38 years from 1753, both to encourage the spread of Wesleyanism and to "control [the] rapidly expanding organisation" as it began to grow at pace in the city. The importance of Portsmouth as an early centre of Wesleyanism was confirmed when it became a Circuit in its own right in 1790. All the denomination's chapels can trace their origins back to one of three parents. The original Wesleyan place of worship of 1767, merely a room, was replaced by a permanent chapel in 1788. This was superseded by another on Pembroke Road in 1811, and from this chapel the Eastney church and three others (now demolished) (Note: At Victoria Road, South Street and Rivers Street.) were founded. In 1768 a meeting house was established on Bishop Street. Its congregation transferred to a converted Anglican church in 1800, and this church helped to found the present Trinity Methodist Church in Southsea. Both of the early chapels contributed to the cost of the 850-capacity Arundel Street Chapel, built in 1845 and bombed in 1941, and this founded churches at Copnor, Drayton and Wymering and three others which have been demolished. (Note: At Buckland, Stamshaw and Wingfield Street.) Portsmouth was also one of the most important locations in Southern England for Bible Christians from the time they first became established in the early 1820s. Their chapel at Brougham Road in Somerstown (1876) is now an art gallery, the Fawcett Road church in Southsea (1893) is in residential use, and the church at Powerscourt Road in North End (1903) was sold to Baptists after World War II. The Primitive Methodist movement was never as strong, but their Jubilee Chapel of 1861 survives as a Pentecostal church and their building at Eastney was taken over by an Evangelical congregation.

=== Baptists ===
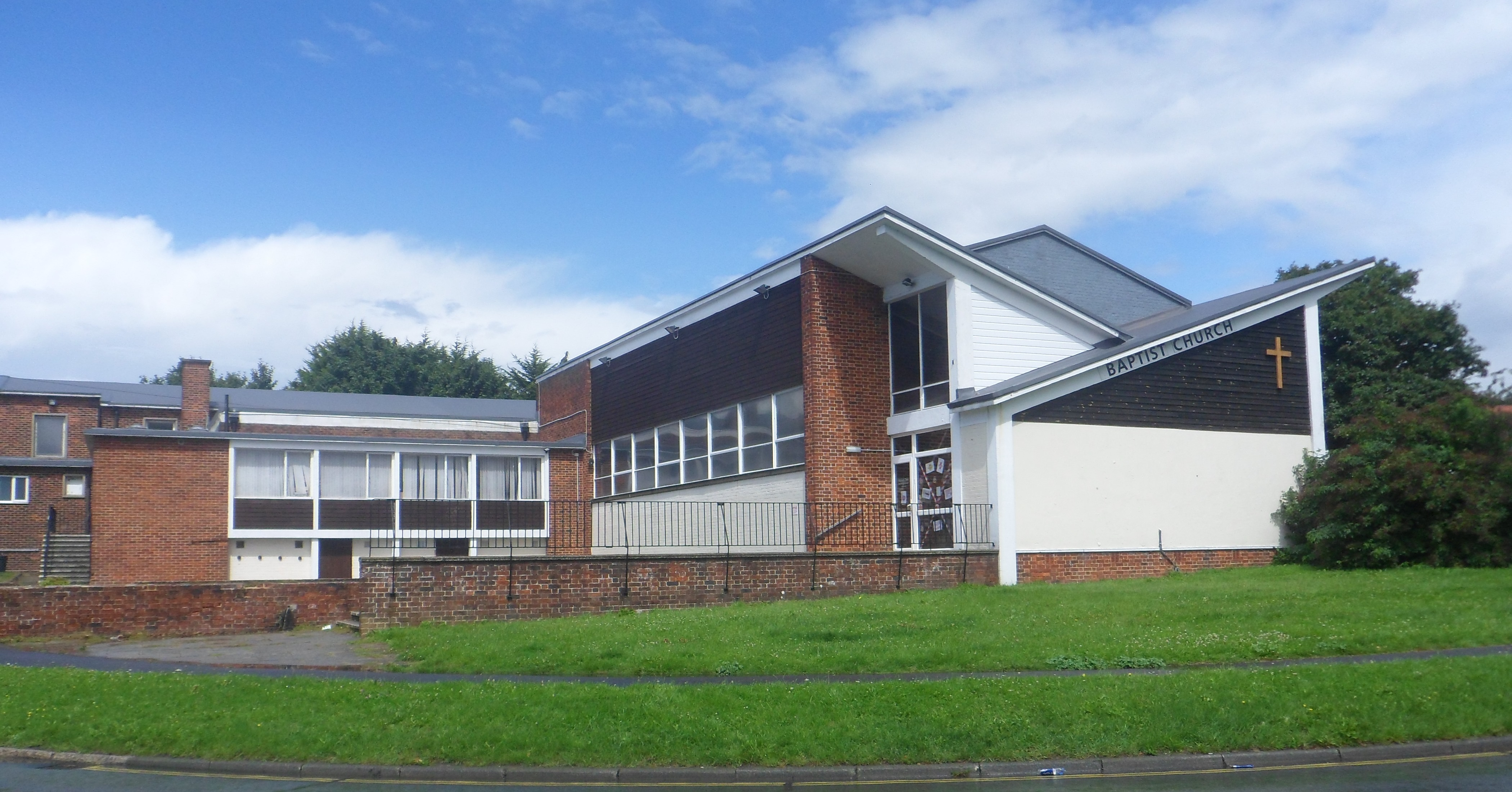
This postwar church serves Baptists on the Paulsgrove estate.

Baptists have been established in Portsmouth for even longer than Methodists: the earliest meeting house was founded in 1698 with help from the cause in Gosport. A replacement was built in 1704, and the 800-capacity Kent Street Chapel succeeded this in 1847. It was bombed in World War II, as were other early chapels on St Thomas's Street (1712) and Clarence Street (1798). Lake Road Chapel (1813) seated 1,800, making it southern England's largest Baptist church: it too was damaged in the war and a redundant Methodist chapel in North End was bought to replace it. The congregation of London Road Baptist Chapel (1902), also in North End, joined this church after their building closed in the early 21st century. In Southsea, a chapel of 1815 was succeeded by Immanuel Baptist Church (1890; rebuilt after war damage and re-registered for worship in 1953), and seceders from the Kent Street chapel founded Elm Grove Baptist Chapel in 1879. Although it was also lost to wartime bombing, a daughter church founded on Devonshire Avenue survives. Another 19th-century chapel on Commercial Road in the city centre was succeeded by the Baptist Tabernacle in suburban Copnor in 1921; this was in turn replaced by a new building on the same site in 1937, but the church now has no denominational links. On the mainland, Cosham's first Baptist church opened in 1904 next to the present building (a converted pub), and the Paulsgrove estate's Baptist church was registered in 1957. Salem Strict and Particular Baptist Church in Old Portsmouth served Strict Baptists from 1813 until it was bombed in 1940; the city council offered a new site in the suburbs, and the new Salem Baptist Chapel in Buckland opened in 1960. In the early 18th century, doctrinal disagreement over the Trinity led to a group of Baptists seceding and forming a Unitarian congregation which still survives. A Presbyterian chapel of 1718 on Old Portsmouth High Street became a Unitarian meeting house, and the congregation continues to worship on the site in a replacement building erected after World War II bombs destroyed the old chapel.

=== Other Protestant denominations ===
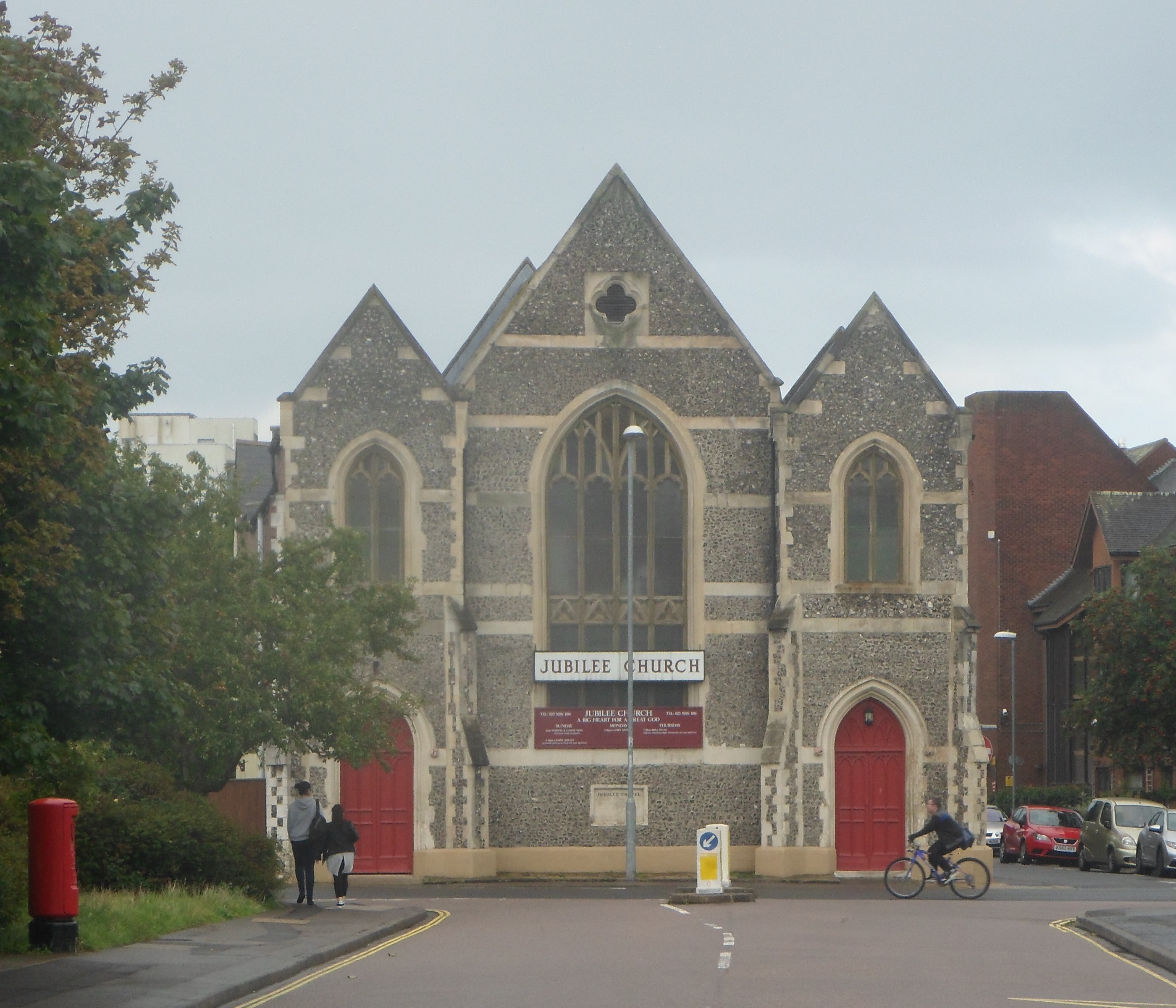
Jubilee Church in Southsea is used by an independent Pentecostal congregation.

Another of Britain's major Nonconformist denominations, the United Reformed Church, was founded in 1972 when the Congregational Church and Presbyterian Church of England merged. Only three congregations still meet in the city—at Buckland (Kingston Road), Drayton and Milton—although several more were active at the time of the union, and Congregationalist worship in the city began in 1754 at a chapel called The Tabernacle on Orange Street, supplemented by a "splendid Georgian chapel" on King Street. Neither survived into the 20th century. Former Congregational church buildings at Southsea (Victoria Road South) and Buckland (Sultan Road), the latter built in 1956, closed in the early 21st century and are now in alternative use. Also in Southsea, Christ Church on Ashburton Road has been demolished. The Drayton church now shares a building with the local Methodist congregation.

Many smaller Christian denominations and groups are also represented in the city. Pentecostal congregations meet at the Oasis Church (Elim Pentecostal), a converted cinema used since 1930; Jubilee Church (independent), a former Primitive Methodist chapel reopened in its new guise in 1948, and the King's Church (Assemblies of God). King's Church is now based at the former Anglican church of St Peter in Somerstown but can trace its history back to the Hebron Pentecostal Church, a "small hall" on Margate Road in Southsea. The Redeemed Christian Church of God, a Pentecostal church of African origin, moved from smaller premises into the former St Wilfrid's Church in 2024. There has been a Quaker presence in Portsmouth since 1650, but the city's Quaker community is not as large as that of Southampton. Meetings take place at a converted house in Hilsea, which replaced a tin tabernacle near Fratton used earlier in the 20th century. Seventh-day Adventists worship in a former Anglican mission hall in North End; their former church became a Sikh gurdwara in the 1970s. Spiritualists established a worshipping community in the city in 1901. The present temple in Southsea dates from 1937, and another exists in Fratton. Jehovah's Witnesses have worshipped locally since the early 20th century, but their first permanent Kingdom Hall in Southsea dates from 1951 and was supplemented by another in Copnor (registered in 1969). There are several churches with an Evangelical or Open Brethren character: Gospel halls in Copnor and Drayton, the non-denominational City Life Church, Eastney Evangelical Free Church, Cornerstone Church Portsmouth and Christ Central, a Christian fellowship in Milton (registered in 1967 and 1983 respectively). Other registered places of worship include a Christadelphian meeting hall (1940), the Portsmouth Chapel of the Church of Jesus Christ of Latter-day Saints (1989), the Church of the Nazarene in Cosham (1942), the First Church of Christ, Scientist, Portsmouth (1956), and a meeting room of the Plymouth Brethren Christian Church in Cosham.

=== Non-Christian religions ===
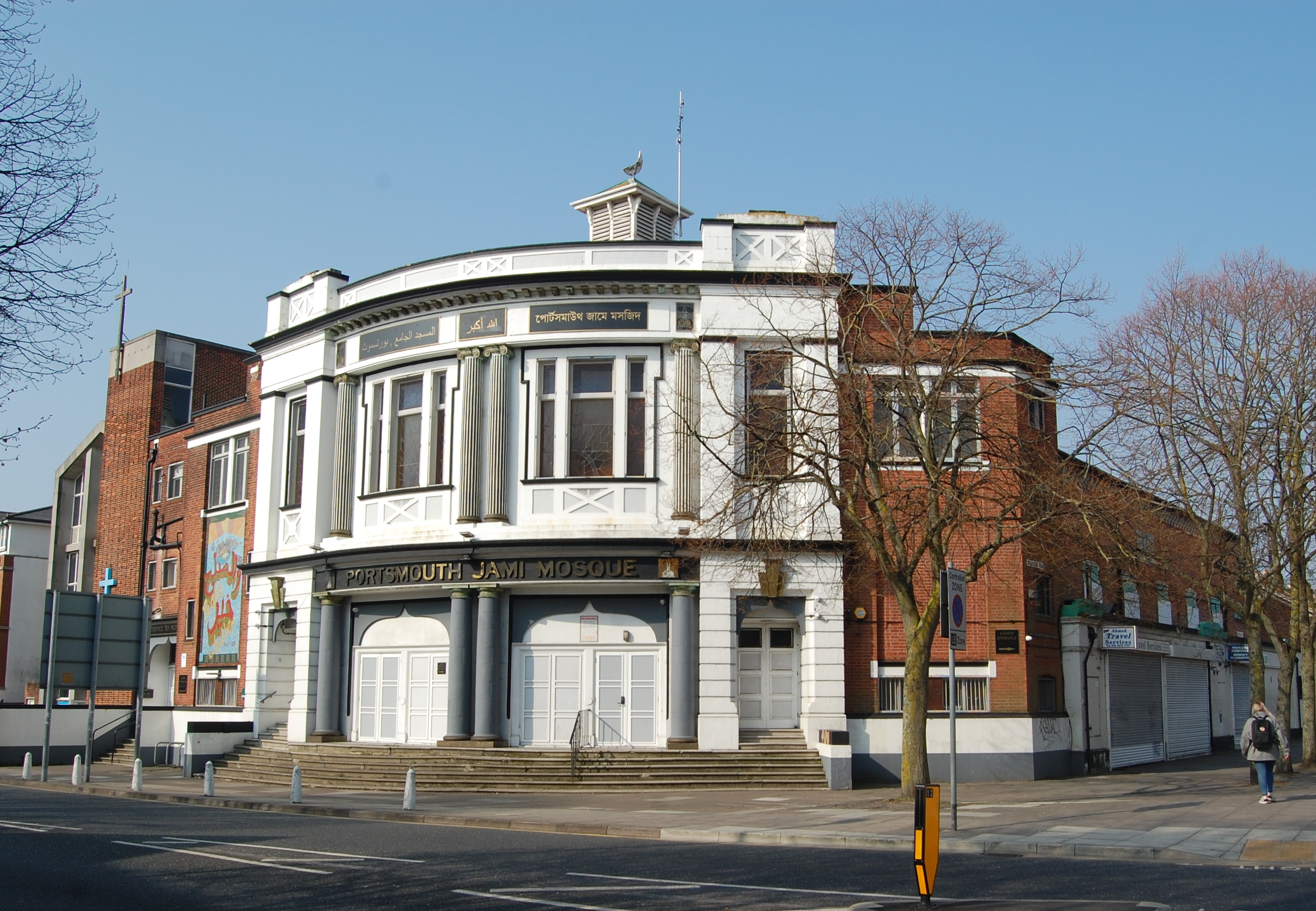
A mosque now occupies the former Plaza Cinema in Southsea.

Portsea Island was "one of the principal Jewish centres in England" by the end of the 18th century. Jews established a congregation on the island during the 1730s and registered their first synagogue in 1742. A larger building replaced it in 1780. The present synagogue was built behind a house in Southsea in 1936; many fittings and artefacts were moved from the earlier building. Shia and Sunni Muslim groups have lived in the city for many years and a house in Southsea was registered for worship in 1978. The congregation moved to a new mosque in the former Plaza Cinema in 2003. A former Anglican mission hall in Fratton became the Portsmouth Central Mosque in 2003, and a 19th-century chapel at Old Commercial Road became a Muslim academy and mosque three years later. The Sikh community in Portsmouth became established after World War II and has grown steadily since then, although a much larger group of worshippers exists in Southampton where a former Anglican church has been converted into a gurdwara. Portsmouth's Sikhs registered their own gurdwara in Southsea in 1974.

Not all places of worship in the city are purpose-built: several secular buildings have been converted for religious use. A building of 1921 in North End, originally a dance hall, became a Chinese Christian church (True Jesus Church) in the 1980s after nearly 40 years as a garage. A former bakery was converted into a Spiritualist church in the 1950s. The chapel on Kingston Road used by the Society of Saint Pius X was built as a branch of Lloyds Bank. Cosham Baptist Church now occupies a postwar pub called Uncle Tom's Cabin which stood next to the original chapel but which closed in the 1990s. Two of the city's former cinemas have been converted into places of worship: as well as the Plaza, now occupied by Portsmouth Jame Mosque, the former Grand Cinema on Arundel Street near the city centre is now the Oasis Centre (home of Oasis Church, an Elim Pentecostal congregation). When originally converted in 1930, the church retained some of the interior layout including the tiered floor.

== Religious affiliation ==
According to the 2011 United Kingdom census, 205,056 lived in Portsmouth. Of these, 52.18% identified themselves as Christian, 3.49% were Muslim, 0.63% were Hindu, 0.57% were Buddhist, 0.23% were Sikh, 0.11% were Jewish, 0.51% followed another religion, 35.03% claimed no religious affiliation and 7.25% did not state their religion. The proportion of people in the city who followed no religion was higher than the figure in England as a whole (24.74%), while Christianity, Islam, Judaism, Hinduism, Sikhism and Buddhism all had a lower following than in the country overall: in 2011, 59.38% of people in England were Christian, 5.02% were Muslim, 1.52% were Hindu, 0.79% were Sikh, 0.49% were Jewish and 0.45% were Buddhist.

== Administration ==
=== Anglican churches ===
All Anglican churches in the city are part of the Anglican Diocese of Portsmouth, the mother church of which is Portsmouth Cathedral. The diocese has seven deaneries. With one exception, the Portsmouth Deanery covers all the parish churches throughout the city: All Saints, the Church of the Ascension, the Church of the Holy Spirit, the Church of the Resurrection, St Alban's, St Andrew's, St Cuthbert's with St Aidens, St Faith's, St George's, St James's, St Jude's, St Luke's, St Margaret's Community Church, St Mary's, St Michael and All Angels, St Peter and St Paul's, St Philip's, St Saviour's, St Simon's, and the three churches which make up the North End Team Ministry—St Francis', St Mark's and St Nicholas'. (Note: The Diocesan website states that the former St Peter's Church (now redundant) remains part of Portsmouth Deanery. Its parish has been combined with St Luke's and is now dedicated to St Luke and St Peter. St Wilfrid's Church at Fratton, which closed in 2022, was also part of the Deanery.) Christ Church at Widley is part of the Havant Deanery.

=== Roman Catholic churches ===
The city's seven Roman Catholic places of worship are part of the Roman Catholic Diocese of Portsmouth, whose seat is Portsmouth Catholic Cathedral, and are split between four parishes, all of which fall under the Portsmouth Pastoral Area of the diocese. The Cathedral parish covers Portsmouth city centre, the Naval Dockyard and the coastline as far as Clarence Esplanade in Southsea, Somers Town, parts of Fratton and Landport. The parish of North End, Corpus Christi and Copnor, St Joseph covers the whole of Portsea Island north of this; from Fratton railway station eastwards the southern boundary is Goldsmith Avenue, Milton Park, Warren Avenue and the southern edge of Milton Common. The parish of Eastney, Our Lady of Lourdes and Southsea, St Swithun covers the east and south of the island, including all of Southsea and Eastney and the southern part of Milton. The parish of Cosham, St Colman and Paulsgrove, St Paul includes all parts of the mainland within the city boundaries.

=== Other denominations ===
Portsmouth's five Methodist churches—at Copnor, Drayon, Eastney, Southsea (Trinity) and Wymering—are part of the 23-church East Solent and Downs Methodist Circuit. City Life Church and Cosham, Devonshire Avenue, Immanuel and North End Baptist Churches belong to the Southern Counties Baptist Association. Grace Baptist Church, Paulsgrove Baptist Church and Salem Baptist Chapel are part of GraceNet UK, an association of Reformed Evangelical Christian churches and organisations. Salem Chapel is also affiliated with the Gospel Standard Baptist movement. Paulsgrove Baptist Church also belongs to two Evangelical groups: the Fellowship of Independent Evangelical Churches (FIEC), a pastoral and administrative network of about 500 churches with an evangelical outlook, and Affinity (formerly the British Evangelical Council), a network of conservative Evangelical congregations throughout Great Britain. Eastney Evangelical Free Church and Cornerstone Church Portsmouth are also members of FIEC. Portsmouth Progressive Spiritualist Church and the Portsmouth Temple of Spiritualism belong to the Spiritualists' National Union and are within the organisation's Southern District, which covers Hampshire, the Isle of Wight, Dorset and Wiltshire.

== Listed status ==
Grade	Criteria
Grade I	Buildings of exceptional interest, sometimes considered to be internationally important.
Grade II*	Particularly important buildings of more than special interest.
Grade II	Buildings of national importance and special interest.
Locally listed (L)	Buildings not on the national list but considered by Portsmouth City Council to be "of local interest in the city [and to] contribute to the local character ... and distinctiveness of the local historic environment".

As of February 2001, there were 440 listed buildings in the city of Portsmouth: 12 with Grade I status, 31 listed at Grade II* and 397 with Grade II status. Portsmouth City Council also maintains a register of locally listed buildings which it considers to be of local architectural and historical interest; many churches which are not on Historic England's national list have been awarded locally listed status.

Historic England also publishes an annual "Heritage at Risk Register"—a survey of assets at risk through decay, damage and similar issues. The churches identified as at risk in the latest update were St Cuthbert's (affected by the poor condition of the bell-tower and church roof), St Luke's (water ingress and damp), St Mary's (structural problems with roofs and windows) and Trinity Methodist Church (water ingress).

== Current places of worship and churches ==
Current places of worship
Name	Image	Location	Denomination/ Affiliation	Grade	Notes	Refs
Christ Central Church		Southsea	Non-denominational		Christ Central Church is a charismatic Non-denominational church first started in 2001 under the name Solent Community Church before changing its name to Christ Central in 2012. Christ Central is a multi-site church meeting on Sunday mornings with a 10am service gathering at the Stacy Centre in Milton/Baffins and a 10:30am service gathering at the John Pounds Centre in Southsea. Christ Central is a member of the Newfrontiers network of churches.	
Cathedral Church of St Thomas of Canterbury (More images)		Old Portsmouth; 50.790478°N 1.104283°W	Anglican	I	When founded in the 1180s by Jean de Gisors, Lord of the Manor of Titchfield, this was a chapel associated with the canons of Southwick Priory and was dedicated to the recently martyred Thomas Becket (Thomas of Canterbury). It was then a parish church for just over six centuries until the Anglican Diocese of Portsmouth was created in 1927. After being raised to cathedral status, extensions and restorations were carried out in the 1930s and 1990s. Some 12th-century fabric survives, especially in the choir, while the tower was removed, rebuilt and topped with its distinctive cupola in the late 17th century.	
St George's Church (More images)		Old Portsmouth; 50.796878°N 1.102907°W	Anglican	II*	This was built in 1753–54 as a proprietary chapel and chapel of ease to St Mary's Church to serve the rapidly growing residential areas near the dockyard. Nicholas Vass may have designed it; he was also responsible for supervising a team of builders which included local residents and shipwrights from the dockyard. Locals also raised over £2,200 towards its cost. The church was separately parished in 1865. "Complex and intriguing", it is a squat grey- and red-brick chapel with a galleried interior and has been likened to a New England church. Little of the original interior survives because of bomb damage in World War II.	
St Mary's Church (More images)		Fratton; 50.803543°N 1.076242°W	Anglican	II*	Until the early 19th century this church served the whole of Portsea Island except Old Portsmouth. It was rebuilt on "a grand scale" in the Perpendicular Gothic Revival style in 1887–89 to the design of Arthur Blomfield, replacing Thomas Ellis Owen's building of 1843 which in turn superseded the medieval church (whose origins may have been as early as the 12th century). It sits in a large churchyard in a densely built residential area. "Architecturally splendid", it was briefly considered as the Diocese of Portsmouth's cathedral before St Thomas's Church was so designated.	
St Peter and St Paul's Church (More images)		Wymering; 50.845739°N 1.077659°W	Anglican	II*	One of many church restorations by George Edmund Street, completed in 1861, the Victorian appearance of the exterior conceals medieval work in this outer suburb west of Cosham, of which it was the original parish church. Early English Gothic in style, it is built of flint and stone and has a small flèche on its tiled roof, characteristic of Street's work. The north and south arcades are 12th- and early 13th-century respectively. The stone-framed windows with tracery have been restored but retain their medieval appearance.	
All Saints Church (More images)		Portsea; 50.804864°N 1.086087°W	Anglican	II	Jacob Owen, supported by his son, Thomas Ellis Owen, designed this Commissioners' church in 1825 and it was parished ten years later, having originally been a chapel of ease to St Mary's. Perpendicular Gothic Revival in style, it survived bombing and extensive rebuilding work in the surrounding area, which has "robbed [it] of its late Georgian context". Later work was undertaken by John Oldrid Scott, William Butterfield and Romilly Craze; Scott's is the Bath stone chancel, contrasting with the Purbeck stone of the rest of the building.	
Christ Church (More images)		Widley; 50.85683°N 1.04806°W	Anglican	II	The old village of Widley stood to the west of the present suburban development along the A3 road. Its ancient church was restored by Winchester-based architect John Colson in 1849, but he replaced it with the present church in the centre of population in 1874. The old church stood until after World War II, though. The parish is known as Christ Church, Portsdown, as Widley village is mostly in the Borough of Havant. The church is mostly of flint with an apsidal end and a "sturdy southwest tower". Michael Farrar-Bell designed much of the stained glass between 1952 and 1961.	
Church of the Holy Spirit (More images)		Southsea; 50.791150°N 1.074796°W	Anglican	II	Begun by J. T. Micklethwaite in 1904 and completed after his death by Charles Nicholson, this replaced a mission chapel of 1889 on a nearby site in this densely built-up part of Southsea. Designed on a very large scale, the Decorated Gothic Revival red-brick building had tall aisles, barrel roofs, seven altars and a capacity of 2,000. Only the walls survived a World War II bombing raid, and Stephen Dykes Bower restored the church. When it reopened it was rededicated to the Holy Spirit; previously it was called St Matthew's Church. Further reordering of 2010 changed the interior fittings again, but the early 20th-century stained glass survives: it was taken from the demolished St Bartholomew's Church, to which the Holy Spirit was originally a chapel of ease.	
St Alban's Church (More images)		Copnor; 50.812408°N 1.064156°W	Anglican	II	As at the Church of the Holy Spirit, Charles Nicholson was the principal architect and Stephen Dykes Bower (along with T. Rushton) restored the church after wartime damage. It dates from 1913–14, succeeding a mission chapel of 1907 designed by J.W. Walmisley which is now the parish hall (click for image). The exterior is Gothic Revival in style, of red brick and with a corner tower. The interior is notable for Dykes Bower's "subtle and effective" use of colour and for its rich fittings. The font was originally from St Mary's Church and was used to baptise Portsmouth-born Charles Dickens and Isambard Kingdom Brunel.	
St Andrew's Church (More images)		Farlington; 50.847833°N 1.027236°W	Anglican	II	Another restoration by George Edmund Street, this time in 1872–75, this is a "delightful small Victorian village church" in a formerly rural parish. The vaulted chancel was built first; the nave, with its lower roofline and characteristic bell-turret, was rebuilt in 1875. The "exceptionally big" west window was retained from the medieval church. Street also designed most of the "subtle and effective" stained glass, including one window to commemorate his parents who had married in the original church in 1815.	
St Cuthbert's Church (More images)		Copnor; 50.806178°N 1.061502°W	Anglican	II	Edwin Stanley Hall, one of the designers of Liberty's department store, was responsible for this large basilica-style church in the north of Copnor. It cost £12,350; there was not enough money to execute Hall's "ambitious ... original" full plans. The style is Byzantine Revival; in particular, the thin domed tower resembles that of Westminster Cathedral. Damaged by bombing in 1941, it was altered in 1958–59, and the interior was subdivided in the early 21st century to provide a doctor's surgery, offices and a smaller worship space. In connection with this, the Diocese of Portsmouth declared the church partially redundant in August 2002.	
St James's Church (More images)		Milton; 50.794300°N 1.057730°W	Anglican	II	A Romanesque Revival church was built to serve Milton, an agricultural village, in 1841 to the design of local architect A. F. Livesay. It was parished in 1844, having been founded from St Mary's and served from there. When the area became heavily urbanised after 1900, the church became too small, and John Oldrid Scott was commissioned to replace it. His large and "austere" flint, stone and brown brick Gothic Revival church had more than twice the capacity, and was opened and consecrated in 1913; his son Charles Marriott Oldrid Scott was also involved in the work. Ninian Comper designed the east window, depicting the Tree of Jesse, in 1933.	
St Jude's Church (More images)		Southsea; 50.786845°N 1.088550°W	Anglican	II	Thomas Ellis Owen was developing parts of Southsea as a fashionable resort in the mid-19th century. At the suggestion of his brother, a priest in London, he funded and built St Jude's Church as the centrepiece of his development. The cost of £5,000 was partly defrayed by a grant from the Admiralty, for whom the spire formed a useful sea mark. The church opened in 1851 and was for the next century "the spiritual home of the prosperous middle classes"; a mission hall (no longer extant) was founded nearby in the 1870s for less wealthy parishioners. Reordering took place in 1973 and 2009–10; the latter included a new glazed entrance. The Gothic Revival church is of flint and stone and has a tall corner tower with a spire.	
St Luke's Church (More images)		Somers Town; 50.796946°N 1.088624°W	Anglican	II	Architect Thomas Hellyer designed this Neo-Norman church in 1858–61 to serve an area historically known as Marylebone and considered at the time "the roughest and most dangerous" in the city. Despite this, the flint and stone building is "still rural in feel". The "pleasing" interior has yellow, red and black brickwork, a hammerbeam roof and some stained glass. The parish has been combined with that of the redundant St Peter's Church at Somers Town.	
St Philip's Church (More images)		Highbury, Cosham; 50.838863°N 1.055572°W	Anglican	II	The vicar of Wymering, in whose parish Cosham lay, opposed the building of another church in the parish; he mandated the "dead-end location" of the interwar Highbury estate. The benefactor requested Ninian Comper as the architect; he had a strong reputation in the interwar period, and St Philip's is "possibly his most brilliant creation ... designed in a thoroughly original way": borrowing from various architectural styles and combining a simple exterior with a rich and carefully designed interior (featuring a central altar—an early use of this arrangement). The brick exterior recalls the early Gothic Revival and is very plain, relieved only by a small bell-cot.	
St Simon's Church (More images)		Southsea; 50.782427°N 1.078699°W	Anglican	II	Thomas Hellyer's "rather grand" church of 1864–66 serves East Southsea, which had been served by a temporary church since 1862. There is no tower or spire, but the roof is tall and steeply gabled. The chancel has an apse at the east end. The style is Decorated Gothic Revival and the church is built of yellow brick with polychromatic brick interior decoration. A parish was formed in 1868 when the church (which cost £4,500) was consecrated. St Simon's Mission Hall stood on Albert Road and was supported by the church.	
Church of the Ascension (More images)		North End; 50.816793°N 1.070995°W	Anglican	L	A. E. Cogswell's red-brick church of 1913–14 (Note: It was completed in June 1914, but the council's Local List records the date as 1916.) has elements of the Perpendicular Gothic Revival and Arts and Crafts styles, similar to but "more ambitious than" his church at Stamshaw, St Saviour's. The church has a clerestory and transepts, a small bell-cote at the west end and a red-tiled roof. John Coates Carter designed an elaborate reredos in 1921 as a World War I memorial. The church cost £7,000, replaced a tin tabernacle and a nearby mission hall, and was funded by the Bishop of Winchester's Six Churches Fund.	
St Nicholas' Church (More images)		Hilsea; 50.822788°N 1.067320°W	Anglican	L	Another church by A. E. Cogswell, and a daughter church of St Mark's like the Church of the Ascension, this cost £6,000 and was designed between 1929 and 1930. Its "rustic" and "homely" Arts and Crafts appearance is reflected in its timbered interior, rendered and roughcast exterior and roof lantern with belfry. There is a stained glass window of Christ in Majesty dated 1949 by F. H. Spear.	
Church of the Resurrection (More images)		Farlington; 50.848391°N 1.052146°W	Anglican	–	The parish boundaries of St Andrew's Church at Farlington were redrawn in 1929 to include the rapidly developing Drayton and East Cosham areas. A site was bought for £1,125 and the church was built in 1930 for £10,000 excluding fittings, which were funded by donations from parishioners. It was consecrated in October 1930—the first new church in the Diocese of Portsmouth, formed three years earlier. W. H. Randoll Blacking's design is simple and "admirably unfussy", loosely in the Perpendicular Gothic Revival style and built of dark brick.	
Harbour Church		Portsea; 50.799320°N 1.091365°W	Anglican	–	In September 2016, in conjunction with the Anglican Diocese of Portsmouth, St Peter's Church, Brighton founded a church plant in the upper floors of a former department store in Commercial Road. The style of worship is intended to appeal to young adults, and the church intends to work with marginalised communities through various outreach initiatives. Within nine months the congregation had become one of the largest of any of the city's Anglican churches.	
St Aidan's Church (More images)		Anchorage Park; 50.826924°N 1.047382°W	Anglican	–	The church was founded in 1998 as an outreach from St Cuthbert's Church in Copnor. Services take place in a dedicated section of the community centre on the Anchorage Park housing estate.	
St Faith's Church (More images)		Landport; 50.801024°N 1.082969°W	Anglican	–	The present building, designed in 1957 by Thomas Ford at a cost of £45,000, replaced two missions founded in the 1870s by St Mary's Church in this densely populated part of Portsmouth. Both churches—St Barnabas' and the original St Faith's—were bombed during World War II. The new church, close to the site of the old St Faith's, is a simple but "eclectic and demure" building of pale brick with a campanile at one corner, topped with a copper cupola. A stained glass window of 1956 depicts Saint Faith and Saint Barnabas.	
St Francis' Church (More images)		Hilsea; 50.830210°N 1.074196°W	Anglican	–	This was founded in 1936 as a mission church of St Mark's to serve the Hilsea area. The city council sold the site to the diocese four years earlier, and a tin tabernacle was used briefly before the "modest Gothic" brick building was erected to the design of V. G. Cogswell. It was extended in 1955; the new part can be used as a hall and for community activities.	
St Margaret's Community Church		Eastney; 50.786665°N 1.067213°W	Anglican	–	St Margaret of Scotland Church closed in December 2015 because of structural problems, but the church was replanted into the adjacent church hall in October 2017. The name St Margaret's Community Church was adopted by the worshipping community at the same time.	
St Mark's Church (More images)		North End; 50.816127°N 1.080870°W	Anglican	–	The original church of this dedication founded numerous mission churches in the northern part of Portsmouth after it opened in 1874. The large church, extended twice, was built of stone with some red brickwork and had a landmark tower. A new church was planned for a site nearby in the 1960s: it opened in 1970 and the old church was demolished a year later. John Wells-Thorpe designed the distinctive yellow-brick and concrete Brutalist cube, consisting of a church above basement meeting rooms and a tall, thin freestanding bell-tower next to the street.	
St Michael and All Angels Church (More images)		Paulsgrove; 50.850739°N 1.093353°W	Anglican	–	The Paulsgrove council estate was developed immediately after World War II below the slopes of Portsdown Hill. Architect Thomas Ford was commissioned to design the estate's Anglican church, construction of which was completed in 1955. "Unashamedly Neo-Georgian" in style, the brown brick and stone building has a corner tower with a distinctive tall lantern top. Hans Feibusch painted murals and the altarpiece in the spacious interior, which also has a stained glass east window depicting the Annunciation.	
St Saviour's Church (More images)		Stamshaw; 50.820968°N 1.084995°W	Anglican	–	A. E. Cogswell and Sons' "vaguely Gothic [Revival]" brick church was funded by the Bishop of Winchester's Six Churches Fund and succeeded a tin tabernacle opened nearby in 1903. The new church, which cost £7,000, opened in 1913. Like its predecessor it was a chapel of ease to St Mark's in North End, but it was parished in 1929. The plain and "mundane" exterior contrasts with a richly decorated interior. The east window contains stained glass by Heaton, Butler and Bayne, designed as a World War I memorial.	
King's Church (More images)		Somers Town; 50.793650°N 1.084106°W	Assemblies of God	II	The former Anglican church of St Peter the Apostle was re-registered for King's Church, part of the Assemblies of God Pentecostal denomination, in 2015; they had occupied it since the previous year. St Peter's had been founded in 1870 by St Jude's Church to serve the Somers Town area. A tin tabernacle was used at first, then in 1882–83 local architect Alfred Hudson designed the present barn-like Gothic Revival brick church. It was damaged in World War II and the Great Storm of 1987. The parish has been joined to that of St Luke's Church.	
Cosham Baptist Church (More images)		Cosham; 50.846203°N 1.064542°W	Baptist	–	Cosham's Baptist church was substantially extended in the late 1990s when it expanded into a former Gales Brewery pub, Uncle Tom's Cabin, which had been built next to it in the early 1960s. The church was originally registered in May 1904; this was cancelled in March 1941 and the church hall was registered instead.	
Devonshire Avenue Baptist Church (More images)		Southsea; 50.790814°N 1.063404°W	Baptist	–	The present building on a corner site in the north of Southsea was built in 1936 and registered the following June, but there had been a Baptist presence in this area since 1898, when the Elm Grove Baptist Church opened a Sunday school. Church services were then held there from 1912 until the permanent church opened. It survived a closure proposal in 1987 and was substantially refurbished at the start of the 21st century.	
Grace Baptist Church (More images)		Copnor; 50.810355°N 1.063700°W	Baptist	–	Bethesda Mission Hall was built on Copnor Road in 1897 and was extended 12 years later. A hall was built at the back in 1945. Refurbishment took place in the 1980s and 1990s, but it closed in 2001. In the same year some members of the former London Road Baptist Church, newly closed, started meeting in the hall under the name Grace Baptist Church; it was later sold to them.	
Immanuel Baptist Church (More images)		Southsea; 50.793912°N 1.079860°W	Baptist	–	The present church opened on 10 April 1957, four years after construction commenced, replacing a chapel of 1889 which had been bombed in 1941. The old chapel seated 700 people and had been designed by John Wills; additions were made in 1905 and 1930. R. W. Leggatt of W. H. Saunders & Sons designed the new church, a concrete-framed building with a large fully-glazed wall to the street and a bulky concrete-topped brick tower to the side.	
North End Baptist Church (More images)		North End; 50.812169°N 1.071199°W	Baptist	–	This dates from 1901–02 and was built for Bible Christian Methodists. In 1949 they sold it to a Baptist congregation bombed out of their chapel in Lake Road (it was registered for their use in November of that year, although not opened until January 1950), and most members of the former London Road Baptist Church joined after that church closed in 2001. The building is Decorated Gothic Revival in style, of red brick with a gabled façade flanked by pinnacles. Until 1975 it was known as Lake Road Chapel, referring to the location of the Baptists' old church.	
Paulsgrove Baptist Church (More images)		Paulsgrove; 50.850095°N 1.099718°W	Baptist	–	This was originally known as the Kent Street Memorial Church, commemorating the city's original Baptist church (founded in 1698, built in 1704 and rebuilt several times until it was destroyed in World War II). The present church was registered for marriages in March 1957, replacing a building in temporary use.	
Christadelphian Hall (More images)		Southsea; 50.792006°N 1.068524°W	Christadelphian	–	Portsmouth's Christadelphians meet for worship at this hall in Devonshire Avenue. It was registered in February 1940, but the inaugural service was held on Sunday 30 October 1938.	
First Church of Christ, Scientist, Portsmouth (More images)		North End; 50.819878°N 1.076796°W	Christian Scientist	–	Premises at Pembroke Road were used between 1921 and 1940 by local adherents of the Church of Christ, Scientist. From 1946 a building next to the present complex was used as a church, which was built in 1956. The new premises at the junction of London and Mayfield Roads consisted of a church and a reading room; a Sunday School building was added soon afterwards. Part of the building was converted into a dance studio by 2014.	
Hilary Church of the Nazarene (More images)		Cosham; 50.844034°N 1.061580°W	Church of the Nazarene	–	This chapel was registered in May 1942.	
Oasis Church (More images)		Landport; 50.799510°N 1.086312°W	Elim Pentecostal	–	A cinema on Arundel Street was licensed in 1911 and it was called The Grand by 1928. It closed in 1930, and in the following year it was bought for £1,000 and converted into a mission hall by the Elim Pentecostal Church, whose origins in Portsmouth dated back to 1927. It was renovated in 1960, 1970 and 1980. The original stage now holds a total immersion baptism tank, and 400 worshippers can be accommodated in the church.	
Eastney Evangelical Free Church (More images)		Eastney; 50.787262°N 1.056709°W	Evangelical	–	In its present form, substantially rebuilt for more than £15,000, the church opened as Eastney Evangelical Free Church on 31 December 1966 and was registered for marriages in February 1967; but it started life in 1900 as a tin tabernacle used by Primitive Methodists. It became the Eastney Gospel Mission in 1918 and was altered and extended in 1947–48 and 1963. The first pastor, W. Norgate, also owned the building between 1918 and 1945.	
Langstone Church (More images)		Milton; 50.802231°N 1.051556°W	Evangelical	–	The church operated from a building on Shore Avenue which was registered as a church in December 1982. Langstone Church closed in 2022 before becoming the second congregation of Christ Central Church. The congregation moved from shore avenue to begin gathering at a new location in 2024.	
Kingdom Hall (More images)		Somers Town; 50.797010°N 1.082166°W	Jehovah's Witnesses	–	This was built in 1951 on the site of some buildings in Raglan Street near Portsmouth & Southsea railway station. It was registered for marriages five years later. It was originally a "very plain concrete-block hall" holding 200 people. Rebuilding and extension work took place in 2017–19 (click for images before and during the work).	
Portsmouth and Southsea Synagogue (More images)		Southsea; 50.788892°N 1.085245°W	Jewish	L	Portsmouth had a significant Jewish population by the mid-18th century (the Jewish burial ground dates from that era and is the oldest in England outside London), and the first synagogue opened in 1742 in a converted building. A purpose-built synagogue was erected on the site in 1780. This remained in use until 1936, when the community bought an Edwardian villa in Southsea and built a new synagogue behind it. The foundation stone was laid on 22 June of that year, and the consecration ceremony led by Chief Rabbi Joseph Hertz took place on 9 September. A. E. Cogswell was the architect; he adopted the Classical style for the barrel-vaulted, domed brick building. Many fittings were transferred from the old building.	
Church of Jesus Christ of Latter-day Saints, Portsmouth Chapel (More images)		Landport; 50.813148°N 1.082679°W	Latter-day Saint	–	Portsmouth's Latter-day Saint meetinghouse opened in 1989 and was registered in August of that year. Since 1963 or 1964 the congregation had used the former British Israel Hall (built in 1931 with an arched entrance between houses on London Road; click for image).	
Trinity Methodist Church (More images)		Southsea; 50.786746°N 1.072149°W	Methodist	II	This church is a "notable landmark" on a main road in Southsea, with its tall, slim brick and stone tower topped with a cupola. It is the city's only surviving Victorian-era Wesleyan church, and a very late example: it opened in 1901, replacing a tin tabernacle built on the site nine years earlier (the new church was built around the old one). Local architect T. R. Wonnacott, who was a Wesleyan Methodist himself, designed it. The foundation stones were laid in April 1900 and the attached school opened later that year. The overall cost of £5,724 considerably exceeded the tender price. Renovations took place in 1951, 1984 and 2017 (the latter funded by the National Lottery Heritage Fund; click for image). The brick chapel is Classical in style, with Corinthian columns and a large Venetian window above the entrance.	
Copnor Methodist Church (More images)		Copnor; 50.815362°N 1.064948°W	Methodist	–	Land at the junction of Copnor and Epworth Roads was bought in 1903. After a secondhand tin tabernacle was rejected in 1907, an iron and wooden building was erected for £335 in 1911. It was registered as the Copnor Wesleyan Mission Church between March of that year and February 1934. The present church was built between December 1932 and March 1934 to the design of G.E. Smith. An extension with schoolrooms to the design of Clayton, Black & Petch opened in 1957. The iron church was reused at Hilsea Barracks.	
Eastney Methodist Church (More images)		Eastney; 50.786453°N 1.059542°W	Methodist	–	The present church was opened and registered in February 2003. It was designed by architect Chris Whiting and built, along with several private houses, on the site of the original church of 1928. Land for this had been sold to a Wesleyan trust in 1877 and a soldiers' home and church hall opened in 1885. Foundation stones for a new building were laid in 1927 and Eastney Wesleyan Church opened in September 1928. The Methodist congregation shared Eastney's Catholic church between October 2000 and the opening of their new building.	
Wymering Methodist Church (More images)		Wymering; 50.847495°N 1.075848°W	Methodist	–	A Wesleyan Methodist chapel built in 1875 in Buckland was compulsorily purchased in 1933. The church formally united with that at Copnor, but a site on the Wymering estate was purchased as well. A new church was built there and was registered in March 1943.	
Drayton United Church (More images)		Drayton; 50.846186°N 1.044282°W	Methodist/United Reformed	–	The church was built for Methodists and registered in their name in May 1934, although it is now a united congregation of Methodists and the United Reformed Church.	
Mile End Chapel (Portsmouth Muslim Academy) (More images)		Portsea; 50.806799°N 1.087339°W	Muslim	II	The chapel is a prominent feature of Old Commercial Road close to the Charles Dickens' Birthplace Museum. It was built in 1884–85 as a new chapel for Baptists who had met at Clarence Street since 1798. The site was bought in July 1884 and the foundation stones were laid three months later. Local man Edward Wright was the architect. It was used between 16 March 1885 and 1 August 1920, at which point the congregation moved again to the newly built church at Tangier Road, Copnor (now known as City Life Church). For most of the next 70 years it served as an annexe to a local college, then after a period of closure it became an art gallery. Since 2006 it has been a Muslim school and mosque. It is a red-brick and slate Gothic Revival chapel with paired arched windows in stone surrounds and a stone bell-cot on the gabled front.	
Portsmouth Jame Mosque (More images)		Southsea; 50.794182°N 1.079942°W	Muslim	II	The 1,750-capacity Plaza Cinema opened on 1 October 1928 and was acquired by Gaumont-British in 1950. In 1965 it was converted into a bingo hall, a use it retained for the next 32 years. Planning permission for its conversion into a mosque was granted in 1998, and it opened five years later for the congregation who previously met at Marmion Road. The architects were H. J. Dyer and Son. The curved two-storey seven-bay façade has Ionic and Doric pilasters flanked by red-brick wings.	
Portsmouth Central Mosque (More images)		Fratton; 50.797996°N 1.077388°W	Muslim	–	This opened as the Fratton Road Anglican Mission Hall in 1886. Situated near the junction of Fratton Road and Somers Road North, it was served from St Mary's Church. It closed in 1961 and was in secular use thereafter (as a warehouse) until planning permission for conversion into a mosque was granted in 2003. It was registered for marriages in May of that year.	
City Life Church (More images)		Copnor; 50.808935°N 1.059222°W	Non-denominational	–	A Baptist chapel of 1885 on Commercial Road (now a Muslim academy and mosque) closed in 1920 when a new site was purchased on Tangier Road in the Copnor area. A tin tabernacle was bought for £500 and erected on the site, and a hall was added four years later; then in 1937 the present building was constructed and opened in August of that year with the name Copnor Baptist Church. The name changed to Tangier Road Baptist Church in 1960, but a larger change happened in 2011 when the church adopted a nondenominational character, left the Baptist Union and adopted the name City Life Church. Refurbishment was carried out the following year.	
Cornerstone Church Portsmouth		Southsea; 50.809080°N 1.077878°W	Non-denominational	–	Christ Church in Southampton helped to found this new non-denominational, FIEC-aligned church in 2016. Worship takes place at Friendship House on Elm Grove in Southsea. Special events and services are held for university students.	
Family Church (Empower Centre)		Buckland; 50.809080°N 1.077878°W	Non-denominational	–	The Empower Centre now has congregations in central Portsmouth, Leigh Park (Havant) and Bridgemary (Gosport). It has its origins in the Abide in the Vine Family Church, founded in 1997 and based in Buckland Community Centre. A school was used later, but in 2012 a former social club on Kingston Road was purchased and converted into a church. The building was registered for worship in 2019 under the name Empower Centre (Portsmouth) – Family Church.	
Copnor Gospel Hall (More images)		Copnor; 50.814051°N 1.064893°W	Open Brethren	–	The church has been used by Open Brethren since 1933, but it was built 12 years earlier as a non-denominational mission hall and was briefly used by the Elim Pentecostal movement in the 1920s and 1930s.	
South Road Church (More images)		Drayton; 50.843328°N 1.043146°W	Open Brethren	–	This opened as Drayton Gospel Hall in October 1934. Construction cost about £1,000, and 250 worshippers could be accommodated.	
Jubilee Pentecostal Church (More images)		Somers Town; 50.796502°N 1.081216°W	Pentecostal	L	A "stern-looking" flint-built Gothic Revival chapel of 1861, this was named after the golden jubilee of Primitive Methodism, founded in 1810. Schoolrooms were added to the rear of the 700-capacity chapel in 1864, followed later by galleries and a new roof. Bomb damage in 1941 was repaired, but the building was no longer needed by the Methodist Church after World War II ended and a group of independent Pentecostals bought it in 1947. It was registered for their use in September of that year and formally opened in 1948. Most of the next three decades were spent under the threat of a compulsory purchase order, lifted in 1976. The name Jubilee Church was retained despite the change of denomination.	
Friends Meeting House		Hilsea; 50.831827°N 1.072642°W	Quaker	–	The Quaker community in Portsmouth is much smaller than that of nearby Southampton, whose large purpose-built meeting house dates from 1884. There was a meeting in Portsmouth from 1694, and a meeting house existed for much of the 18th century, but after it closed in 1794 over a century passed before worship resumed in various rented rooms. From 1923 the former Railway Mission Hall (a tin tabernacle) near Fratton was used; then in 1955 a house was purchased in Hilsea and the ground floor was converted into a meeting house, retaining residential accommodation at first-floor level.	
RCCG Discipleship Centre (More images)		Fratton; 50.807524°N 1.072051°W	Redeemed Christian Church of God	L	St Wilfrid's Church was founded in 1905 and completed two years later to the design of John Thomas Blackwell. It was a Church of England mission chapel in St Mary's parish and was designed as a dual-purpose building which could be used as a hall as well, with the chancel separated from the lower nave by a screen; meeting rooms were also provided at a lower level. The style is Perpendicular Gothic Revival with elements of Tudor Revival; red brick is the main material, with stonework around the windows. The church closed in 2022 and was taken over by the Redeemed Christian Church of God in December 2024.	
Cathedral of St John the Evangelist (More images)		Portsea; 50.800319°N 1.094308°W	Roman Catholic	II	Four architects were involved in the design of Portsmouth's Catholic cathedral: John Crawley, who won the design competition in 1877; J. S. Hansom, who continued Crawley's architectural practice after the latter died in 1882; Alexander Scoles, who designed the west end in 1906, and W. C. Mangan, who designed a side chapel in the 1920s. The Gothic Revival cathedral "has the appearance of a large Victorian parish church", which is what it was intended to be before the decision was taken to elevate it to cathedral status in 1882, the year it opened. Fareham red brick is the main building material, with Portland stone used for dressings and window surrounds. The intended spire could not be built because the damp, unstable ground on the site could not support the extra weight.	
Corpus Christi Church (More images)		North End; 50.818272°N 1.080803°W	Roman Catholic	L	J. William Lunn's design of 1892–93 was only partly executed (the architect's drawing is held in the church), and the church was completed in 1904 to the design of C. W. Bevis & Son. Changes included a bell-cot at the gable end instead of the planned tower and spire. Likened to a "huge barn", the 600-capacity Perpendicular Gothic Revival building, of red brick with stone dressings, is plain but has an "attractive" interior including stained glass by the firm of Hardman & Co.	
St Colman's Church (More images)		Cosham; 50.846767°N 1.061821°W	Roman Catholic	L	Representing a very late and "striking" use of the Gothic Revival style, this church by W. C. Mangan dates from 1928 and replaced a converted building which had previously been a milk depot and a Territorial Army drill hall but which was used a church from 1921, served by a curate from the cathedral. The church was dedicated to Colmán of Cloyne, patron saint of the Diocese of Cloyne in Ireland, because the bishop was from there and many priests from the area served in the Diocese of Portsmouth at the time. The walls combine concrete and knapped flint in a chequerboard pattern. Hilsea Barracks was part of the parish and had its own private chapel until the 1960s.	
St Joseph's Church (More images)		Copnor; 50.808578°N 1.062314°W	Roman Catholic	L	Bishop John Cahill bought land in Copnor in March 1908 for £400. A presbytery and temporary church (registered in October 1909) were built, then in 1913–14 the architect (and priest at Basingstoke's church) Alexander Scoles designed the permanent building, which has seen little alteration since apart from some renovations in the 1960s and 1974. It opened on 23 August 1914. St Joseph's has "quite a showy front" of red brick and stone, with the saint depicted twice: in the elaborately carved tympanum above the door, and in an aedicule near the top of the crow-stepped gable. The interior has many high-quality fittings.	
St Swithun's Church (More images)		Southsea; 50.786013°N 1.077074°W	Roman Catholic	L	The cathedral founded its first chapel of ease in 1884, two years after it opened, to serve Southsea. A temporary church opened in 1886, followed by a school six years later, and the first stone of the present church was laid in 1899. Construction cost about £6,000, and the church opened and was registered in 1901. Designed by Alexander Scoles, it is "less ambitious" than his later church at Copnor, but the high-quality interior decoration and fittings include a "sumptuous" alabaster tabernacle stand, wall paintings attributed to Nathaniel Westlake, and a reredos also by Westlake.	
Church of Our Lady of Lourdes (More images)		Eastney; 50.789381°N 1.052984°W	Roman Catholic	–	This "low, unpretentious building" is prefabricated and has rendered exterior walls. It opened in February 1956 on the site of a house whose garage had been converted into a temporary church in 1937. A local builder named Marchetti undertook this work and built the new church. It was registered for marriages in March 1965.	
St Paul's Church (More images)		Paulsgrove; 50.849600°N 1.097556°W	Roman Catholic	–	Paulsgrove was in St Colman's parish at first, but that church was too small for all the worshippers as the postwar estate grew. A site for a church there was acquired in 1949 and a secondhand Army hut was used until September 1959 (although this church, dedicated to St Pius X, was registered for worship between 1956 and 1964). Services then moved into a new Catholic school's assembly hall, then in 1970 St Paul's Church was built and registered.	
St Agatha's Church (More images)		Portsea; 50.802312°N 1.092176°W	Roman Catholic (P.O.O.L.W.)	II*	Winchester College established a "slum mission" chapel in "the most squalid part of Portsea" in 1882. In 1894 construction of the present church started, and it was consecrated on 27 October 1895. It was a centre for High Church Anglicanism, and was richly decorated in an Italian style by its architect J. H. Ball, who had trained in Italy, and by other designers (in particular Heywood Sumner, who created the sgraffito scheme in the apse). The church closed in 1955 and was partly demolished for road widening, then used as a warehouse by the Royal Navy until the city council bought it in the late 1980s. Subsequently it was acquired by the Personal Ordinariate of Our Lady of Walsingham, who reopened it and re-registered it for worship in July 2005.	
Salvation Army Citadel (More images)		Landport; 50.802588°N 1.086420°W	Salvation Army	–	Also known as the No. 1 Corps Barracks, this large modern citadel is on the edge of the city centre. The original building opened in 1890 at a cost of £7,000 on the site of a former Particular Baptist chapel, used from 1822 until 1863 and later in secular use. More renovations took place in 1899 and 1936, but five years later the citadel was bombed. A. E. Cogswell and Sons built a replacement in 1948–49, then in 1958 the present citadel was built nearby at a cost of £31,000. A community centre complex was added in 1993.	
Salvation Army Citadel (More images)		Southsea; 50.786474°N 1.077658°W	Salvation Army	–	Its marriage registration dates from March 1919, but this citadel on Albert Road opened on 10 September 1897 after a four-month construction period costing £2,140. Alec Gordon was the architect. It replaced a tin tabernacle of smaller capacity on the same site. Following renovation work in 1962, the capacity is 500.	
Salvation Army Hall (More images)		Buckland; 50.811955°N 1.079102°W	Salvation Army	–	The foundation stones of this hall (headquarters of the Portsmouth North Corps) were laid in 1928, and it opened on 15 June 1929. It was registered for marriages 19 years later.	
Portsmouth Seventh Day Adventist Church (More images)		North End; 50.814056°N 1.072770°W	Seventh-day Adventist	–	The 400-capacity Chichester Road Mission Hall was built for Anglicans in 1903. After the Church of the Ascension opened nearby, it became a combined church and hall, then from 1964 solely a church hall. Local Seventh-day Adventists who had previously worshipped at Margate Road in Southsea bought the brick Gothic Revival building in 1968 and converted it into their church; it was registered for them in September that year.	
Guru Nanak Sar Gurdwara (More images)		Southsea; 50.792454°N 1.086241°W	Sikh	–	This building on Margate Road is now being used by its third religious group. When built in the 19th century it was a Sunday school for Congregationalists—also used as a mission hall for a short time—then in 1938 it was sold to Seventh-day Adventists. They used it until they bought the former Anglican mission hall on Chichester Road in North End in 1964 (although its marriage registration, granted in 1942, was not cancelled for another four years). Since 1967 it has been a gurdwara and Sikh community centre.	
Church of Our Lady Help of Christians (More images)		Fratton; 50.807016°N 1.076889°W	Society of Saint Pius X	L	The building is a single-storey stone-built structure with tall arched windows. It was built as a bank branch for Lloyds in about 1900. It was sold in 1987 to the Society of Saint Pius X, a traditionalist Catholic organisation which practices the Tridentine rite, and opened as a church on 27 February 1988. It was registered for worship and marriages in November of that year.	
Portsmouth Progressive Spiritualist Church (More images)		Fratton; 50.797589°N 1.077870°W	Spiritualist	–	The building was originally a bakery; planning permission to convert it into a Spiritualist church was sought in 1954. It was registered for marriages in September of that year, and the church was formally opened and dedicated on 9 October.	
Portsmouth Temple of Spiritualism (More images)		Southsea; 50.786730°N 1.082052°W	Spiritualist	–	The former Portsmouth School of Art building in Southsea was converted into a Spiritualist temple in 1905. The present temple, "regarded as one of the finest in England", was built on the site between 1939 and 1940 (the foundation stone was laid on 15 July 1939) and registered for marriages in 1941. Construction cost £3,600. The 300-capacity church is at first-floor level and has a large barrel-vaulted ceiling; conference and healing rooms are below.	
Salem Strict and Particular Baptist Church (More images)		Buckland; 50.803683°N 1.072605°W	Strict Baptist	–	Strict Baptist members of the Kent Street Baptist Chapel seceded in 1813 and founded Salem Chapel nearby. The "plain, almost square building" was registered for marriages in 1893 and extended in 1936, but four years later bombing destroyed it. Members reconstituted the church after the war in hired premises, and the city council offered a site for a new chapel in Buckland. This opened in 1960 and was registered for marriages in June 1970.	
True Church of Jesus (More images)		North End; 50.820446°N 1.082134°W	True Jesus Church	–	This building in North End was registered for worship by a Chinese Christian group in December 1985, but the prominent date of 1921 on its gable indicates its origins. It was built as a dance hall and was used for that purpose until 1940; after World War II it served as a garage for about 40 years. Before buying and altering the building to form a church, the congregation met in a Chinese restaurant for worship from 1977.	
John Pounds Memorial Church (More images)		Old Portsmouth; 50.791651°N 1.101251°W	Unitarian	–	A 700-capacity chapel was built on the present site in High Street in 1718 for Presbyterians. The congregation moved towards Unitarianism, and the meeting house joined that denomination in 1819. The building was extended and redecorated several times in the 19th century, and a small graveyard opened outside (incorporating a memorial of 1839 to John Pounds). Later, consideration was given to merging with the General Baptist congregation at their chapel in St Thomas Street, but nothing came of this. Both chapels were lost to bombing in 1941, and the Unitarians used a building at 62 Kingston Crescent as a temporary church from 1948 until the present church of 1955–56, designed by Bournemouth architect E. A. Down, was ready. It is a plain brick-built chapel in a "simplified" Neo-Georgian style.	
Buckland United Reformed Church (More images)		Buckland; 50.811228°N 1.079028°W	United Reformed	–	Worshippers at the Congregational chapel on Orange Street (founded in 1754) established a daughter church in the then outlying village of Buckland in 1820. It became independent of the Orange Street chapel 15 years later, and the present church was built in 1869 with a capacity of 850-900 and at a cost of £3,500. Wine merchant John Welch paid some of the cost and laid the foundation stone. The interior has been altered, but the red-brick and stone exterior is little changed. There is a short corner tower with clock and spire, and the church has halls and schoolrooms at the rear (facing Queen Street). Its street-corner location on the busy Kingston Road makes it a local landmark.	
Christ Church (More images)		Milton; 50.796387°N 1.059039°W	United Reformed	–	The Kendall Memorial Congregational Church, as it was originally known, opened in 1913 on the opposite side of the road from Milton's first Congregational chapel. It was named after a long-serving minister there who had died eight years earlier. It was a tin tabernacle intended as a temporary facility, and after bomb damage in World War II the congregation met in a school until the present church was built in 1955 at a cost of £14,000. It opened in February of that year and was registered three months later. The church was damaged in the Burns' Day Storm of 1990.	

== Former places of worship ==
Former places of worship
Name	Image	Location	Denomination/ Affiliation	Grade	Notes	Refs
Domus Dei (Royal Garrison Church) (More images)		Old Portsmouth; 50.788983°N 1.103865°W	Anglican	II	This was founded as part of the Hospital of St John and St Nicholas in the early 13th century. It was administered by Southwick Priory and was also used as a parish church. After the Dissolution of the monasteries, the buildings were used for storage by the ministry, then as the Royal Garrison Church (nicknamed the "Army Cathedral"). Many alterations had taken place by 1866, when George Edmund Street was commissioned to restore it. The nave was destroyed by bombs in 1941 and now stands roofless, but the chancel was preserved.	
St John the Baptist's Church (More images)		Rudmore; 50.814763°N 1.086002°W	Anglican	II	St Mark's Church founded a mission chapel in the Rudmore area soon after 1900. John Coleridge's "very austere" brick basilica-style church replaced the temporary building in 1916. Some fittings from St Agatha's Church were moved here after the latter closed in the 1950s, shortly after wartime bomb damage to the roof was repaired. Further repairs took place in 1963, but the Diocese of Portsmouth declared the church redundant with effect from 1 August 1979, and made it available for commercial use in 1980 and then for residential use in 1985. It 1986–87 it was converted into forty one-bedroom flats. As many interior fittings as possible were preserved, and the exterior retains much of its original appearance.	
St Patrick's Church (More images)		Eastney; 50.790371°N 1.063419°W	Anglican	II	G. E. Smith designed this mission church in "a strange style reminiscent of Charles Harrison Townsend", an Art Nouveau architect, in 1906. The long single-storey building of local red brick has a series of round gables framed by stonework. It seated 450 worshippers. Closure came in 1996 after a brief period shared with a Greek Orthodox congregation, and flats were created inside.	
St Margaret of Scotland Church (More images)		Eastney; 50.786877°N 1.067112°W	Anglican	L	A tin tabernacle was erected on the site in 1899 and dedicated in October of that year, then architect J. T. Lee was commissioned to build a permanent church. The chancel was completed in 1903, but the nave took seven years more (the tin tabernacle was used as a nave until then, the chancel having been built around it) and the "unsympathetic" and plain west end was not added until 1965. The interior layout is "quirky" and unusual; the design is loosely Perpendicular Gothic Revival. The church was closed permanently on 15 December 2016 after a period of temporary closure because of structural problems and unsafe electrics.	
St Faith's Institute and Mission Church (More images)		Landport; 50.800728°N 1.086133°W	Anglican	–	This was built as part of the complex of buildings making up St Faith's Mission in a crowded slum area near the city centre. It replaced an earlier institute building and opened on 14 December 1903 after a seven-month construction period. It was also known as the Magdalen Institute after its patron, Magdalen College, Oxford, and had a large hall and various rooms for clubs and other social events. After the destruction of the mission church in 1941, the institute was converted into a church; after a replacement church was opened in 1958, the institute was used as a warehouse for nearly 30 years until it was converted back into a community centre in 1996. It is now known as the E. C. Roberts Centre.	
Hebron Pentecostal Church (More images)		Southsea; 50.791477°N 1.082753°W	Assemblies of God	–	The independent Hebron Pentecostal Fellowship was founded in 1915 and was using this former billiards hall on Margate Road by 1956 (and possibly as early as 1950)—although it was not registered for marriages until 1962. Described in 1989 as "a small hall, recently renovated", it was sold in 1996 when the congregation (now named King's Church) transferred to a community centre, then to premises on Elm Grove and finally to the former St Peter's Church in Somers Town.	
King's Church (More images)		Southsea; 50.790529°N 1.089174°W	Assemblies of God	–	After leaving the Hebron Pentecostal Church hall in 1996 and spending three years at a community centre, the newly renamed King's Church congregation—now aligned with the Assemblies of God Pentecostal denomination—moved to the former Pot Black snooker club at 37 Elm Grove. It was registered for their use between 2003 and 2015, when they moved to the redundant Anglican church of St Peter in Somers Town.	
London Road Baptist Church (More images)		North End; 50.813867°N 1.080306°W	Baptist	–	Lake Road Baptist Church founded a new church in the rapidly growing North End area in 1902. Land had been bought eight years earlier for £700, and a Sunday school (later the church hall) opened first. The first stones were laid on 29 January 1902, and eight months later London Road Baptist Church opened at a cost of £3,929, designed by John Wills. Structural problems forced its closure in 2001: the last service took place on 9 December of that year, the registration was cancelled in March 2002, and the building was sold and renovated to become a pub.	
Milton Congregational Chapel (More images)		Milton; 50.794724°N 1.059002°W	Congregational	–	The chapel dated from the mid-19th century, although sources differ on its construction date. It was extended in 1903, but ten years later a replacement opened on the opposite side of Milton Road and the city council bought the former chapel in 1923. It was converted into a library, then became a village hall and community centre. Another extension was built in 2012.	
Sultan Road Congregational Church (More images)		Landport; 50.807638°N 1.084278°W	Congregational	–	This chapel opened in 1956 on a site provided by Portsmouth City Council. It replaced Zion Chapel, built in the 1840s, whose congregation moved to locations in the Buckland area after the destruction of that church during World War II bombing. By 2006 it had closed and was being used by the International Pentecostal Church of Christ, but that church moved to another location in 2015 and the building has been in secular use since then.	
Kingdom Hall (More images)		Copnor; 50.815356°N 1.069967°W	Jehovah's Witnesses	–	This Kingdom Hall was at the rear of an end-of-terrace house on Paddington Road on the borders of the North End and Copnor districts. In 2018 Portsmouth's Jehovah's Witness congregations were consolidated into three and all transferred to the rebuilt Kingdom Hall at Southsea, and this building was put up for sale. Its marriage registration, which dated from January 1969, was cancelled in May 2019.	
Brougham Road United Methodist Church (More images)		Southsea; 50.792895°N 1.089108°W	Methodist	L	This chapel and its schoolrooms opened in June 1876 for Bible Christians—the sixth Bible Christian church in Portsmouth. It had a capacity of 750 and cost £4,000. Damaged twice by bombs during World War II, the congregation joined the chapel at Fawcett Road and the building was bought by Portsmouth City Corporation for £6,800 after a period in which they rented it. The Corporation converted the chapel into an annexe of the Portsmouth College of Art; after closing in 1979 it was converted into an art gallery.	
Fawcett Road United Methodist Church (More images)		Southsea; 50.794050°N 1.076686°W	Methodist	–	Opened in 1892 as a Bible Christian chapel and registered in August 1894, this was used for nearly a century: the last service was held on 26 August 1984 and the building was sold for residential use. The Priory Court flats were completed in 1986, but the red-brick exterior is little altered. The congregation from the nearby Brougham Road chapel joined in the 1940s, and the sale of that building contributed £2,800 to Fawcett Road's funds in 1953.	
Wesley Methodist Church (More images)		Fratton; 50.799419°N 1.076699°W	Methodist	–	A Central Hall was an informal and flexible type of Methodist church which did not resemble a traditional chapel. They were designed to "encourage those who might hesitate to enter the older buildings". J. Arthur Rank funded many of them, and local examples could be found at Albert Road, Copnor, Eastney and here at Fratton, where land was bought in 1886 and a 1,000-capacity temporary building was erected in 1889 for £500. It was superseded by a permanent building in 1899–1900 (architect J. Jameson Green), but this was demolished in 1926 for road widening. Its replacement cost £40,000, of which Rank paid half, and opened in October 1928. Rebuilt again in 1990–92, it closed in 2009 and is now owned by the Chinese community.	
Portsmouth Jame Mosque (More images)		Southsea; 50.785626°N 1.084275°W	Muslim	–	A Victorian villa in Marmion Road was substantially altered internally in the 1970s and 1980s to provide a central mosque for the city of Portsmouth, used by both Shia and Sunni followers. It opened in 1978 and was registered for marriages in December of that year. In 2003 the congregation transferred to the new Jame Mosque nearby, housed in the former Plaza Cinema; the old mosque is still owned by the Muslim community as the Portsmouth Hafiziah Madrasah school.	
Bethesda Mission Hall (More images)		Southsea; 50.790410°N 1.095040°W	Open Brethren	–	Several chapels and mission halls were founded by the Bethesda mission, a local Brethren group, in the late 19th century. This hall, which dates from 1881, survives in alternative use: it was sold to St Jude's Church in 1957 and has been used for various purposes, latterly a nursery school.	
Brookfield Hall (More images)		Fratton; 50.801497°N 1.072687°W	Open Brethren	–	This hall opened in 1892 as an Anglican mission church in the parish of St Mary's. It was superseded by the nearby St Boniface Mission and was sold to Open Brethren. From 1898 until its closure and sale in 2012 it was used by that group, initially with the name Brookfield Mission Hall but later renamed Brookfield Hall (it was registered for marriages with this name in November 1935). The building is now used as a nursery school in association with The Salvation Army.	
Eastney Gospel Mission (More images)		Eastney; 50.787127°N 1.065510°W	Open Brethren	–	This was recorded as the Eastney Gospel Room as early as 1911. It had closed by 1934, when a shop unit was inserted, and has been a timber merchants' shop since 1958.	
Hellyer Road Room		Eastney; 50.787098°N 1.063096°W	Plymouth Brethren	–	The building dates from 1933 and was erected for Plymouth Brethren, in whose use it remained in 1963. It was last in religious use in 1976, and became a gymnasium by 1987.	
Brethren Meeting Room (More images)		Cosham; 50.841572°N 1.062862°W	Plymouth Brethren Christian Church	–	In 1963 the original building here was recorded as one of several local meeting rooms of Exclusive Brethren (Note: Following a doctrinal disagreement in 1970, the Exclusive Brethren split; one group became the present-day Plymouth Brethren Christian Church.) in the Portsmouth area. This replacement opened in 2017 in a former youth club building next to the original building (pictured in August 2017), which still stands next to it and is now in medical use. By 2019, the meeting room was no longer required and a planning application was raised for its demolition.	
RCCG Discipleship Centre (More images)		Portsea; 50.803792°N 1.089680°W	Redeemed Christian Church of God	–	The Portsmouth congregation of the Redeemed Christian Church of God Pentecostal denomination initially met in Buckland Community Centre before moving to the nearby United Reformed Church in 2011. The following year they obtained premises at Clarence Street and registered the building for worship. With the help of the city council, who planned to regenerate the site, the church moved to the former St Wilfrid's Anglican church in December 2024.	
Southsea United Reformed Church (More images)		Southsea; 50.788723°N 1.082933°W	United Reformed	L	Discussions about a Congregational church to serve Southsea started in the early 1880s, and at the end of the decade a secondhand tin tabernacle was erected on a corner site on Victoria Road South. C. W. Bevis's permanent church—an "arty" Perpendicular Gothic Revival design of red brick and stone—opened in 1911; the foundation stone had been laid on 3 May of that year. The battlemented corner tower, with elaborate tracery and originally topped with a spire (removed in 1975), was a landmark. Latterly known as South Portsmouth United Reformed Church after the closure of the denomination's nearby Christ Church, the building closed in 2007 and was empty for a time. Put up for sale in 2015, it was converted into flats soon afterwards. The church was registered for marriages between April 1912 and August 2012.	

== Bibliography ==
- Balfour, Alan (1970). Portsmouth. City Buildings Series. London: Studio Vista. ISBN 0-289-79806-X.
- Chambers, Ralph (1952). The Strict Baptist Chapels of England: The Chapels of Surrey and Hampshire. Vol. 1. Thornton Heath: Ralph Chambers.
- Cooper, W. Donald (March 1973). "Methodism in Portsmouth 1750–1932". The Portsmouth Papers (18). Portsmouth: Portsmouth City Council.
- Dwyer, Gerard (1981). Diocese of Portsmouth – Past and Present. Portsmouth: Portsmouth Diocesan Centenary Committee.
- Hague, Graham; Hague, Judy (1986). The Unitarian Heritage: An Architectural Survey (PDF) (1st ed.). Sheffield: Unitarian Heritage. ISBN 0-9511081-0-7.
- Hill, Roy (2002) [1990]. The Assemblies Address Book (PDF) (5th ed.). Bristol: Christian Year Publications. ISBN 1-872734-25-1. Archived from the original (PDF) on 19 September 2004.
- Keat, Peter; Evans, Audrey (2015). Drayton Revisited. Portsmouth: The Drayton Revisited Local History Group.
- Kelly, Bernard W. (1907). Historical Notes on English Catholic Missions (PDF). London: Kegan Paul, Trench, Trübner & Co.
- Lloyd, David W. (1974). Buildings of Portsmouth and its Environs: A survey of the dockyard, defences, homes, churches, commercial, civic and public buildings. Portsmouth: City of Portsmouth. ISBN 0-901559-53-9.
- McAuley, Fr James (16 July 2016). The Diocese of Portsmouth Parish Boundaries 2016 (PDF) (Report). Portsmouth: Roman Catholic Diocese of Portsmouth. Archived (PDF) from the original on 16 May 2017.
- O'Brien, Charles; Bailey, Bruce; Pevsner, Nikolaus; Lloyd, David W. (2018). Hampshire: South. The Buildings of England. London: Yale University Press. ISBN 978-0-300-22503-7.
- Offord, John (1989). Churches, Chapels and Places of Worship on Portsea Island. Southsea: John Harman. ISBN 0-9514001-0-X.
- Pevsner, Nikolaus; Lloyd, David W. (1967). Hampshire and The Isle of Wight. The Buildings of England. London: Yale University Press. ISBN 978-0-300-09606-4.
- Slater, John (December 2011). "City of Portsmouth Local List of Buildings: Special Architectural and Historic Interest" (PDF). Portsmouth City Council. Archived (PDF) from the original on 26 June 2017.
- Stell, Christopher (1991). Inventory of Nonconformist Chapels and Meeting-Houses in South-West England. London: Royal Commission on the Historical Monuments of England. ISBN 0-117011-81-9.
- Various authors (1994). Memories of Eastney. Portsmouth: Workers' Educational Association (Portsmouth Branch Local History Group). ISBN 1-873911-04-1.
- Various authors (1995). Memories from Over the Lines. Portsmouth: Workers' Educational Association (Portsmouth Branch Local History Group). ISBN 1-873911-06-8.
- Various authors (1998). Kingston Road Remembered (with The Crescent and The Cross). Portsmouth: Workers' Educational Association (Portsmouth Branch Local History Group). ISBN 1-873911-12-2.
- Various authors (2006). Memories of North End and Hilsea. Portsmouth: Workers' Educational Association (Portsmouth Branch Local History Group). ISBN 1-873911-23-8.
