= Summerton =

Summerton may refer to:

== People ==
- Antonio Summerton (1980–2007), South African actor and television presenter
- John Summerton, British musician, in Flintlock, later The Rubettes and Herman's Hermits
- Jonathan Summerton, American racing car driver
- Justin Summerton, New Zealand artist and writer
- Laura Summerton (born 1983), also known as Laura Hodges, Australian professional basketball player
- Michael Summerton (1943–2009), English actor and talent agent
- Rebecca Summerton, Australian film producer

== Places ==
- Summerton, South Carolina, U.S.
  - Summerton High School, an historic building in the town

== Other uses ==
- Summerton Athletic F.C., a Scottish football club in Govan, Glasgow

== See also ==
- Summerton Bog, a bog in Marquette County, Wisconsin, U.S.
- Summerton Mill, a 2005 British children's television series
- Somerton (disambiguation)
- Summerstown (disambiguation)
- Summertown (disambiguation)
