= Somerton =

Somerton may refer to:

== Places ==
=== Australia ===
- Somerton, New South Wales
- Somerton Park, South Australia, a seaside Adelaide suburb
  - Somerton Man, unsolved case of an unidentified man found dead in 1948 on the Somerton Park beach
- Somerton, Victoria

=== United Kingdom ===
- Somerton, Newport, Wales
- Somerton, Norfolk, England
  - East Somerton
  - West Somerton
- Somerton, Oxfordshire, England
- Somerton, Somerset, England
  - Hundred of Somerton, a former administrative unit
- Somerton, Suffolk, England
- Somerton Castle, Lincolnshire, England

=== United States ===
- Somerton, Arizona
- Somerton, Ohio
- Somerton, Philadelphia, a neighborhood of Philadelphia, Pennsylvania
- Somerton, Virginia, a former town in the defunct Nansemond County

== People ==
- Edward Somerton (died 1461), an Irish barrister
- Baron Somerton, a subsidiary title of the Earls of Normanton

== See also ==
- Somerton railway station (disambiguation)
- Summerton (disambiguation)
- Summertown (disambiguation)
