= Summertown =

Summertown may refer to:

== Places ==
- Summertown, Georgia, U.S.
- Summertown, Oxford, England
- Summertown, South Australia
- Summertown, Tennessee, U.S.

== Other uses ==
- Summertown (album), by Deborah Conway and Willy Zygier, 2004

== See also ==
- Somerstown, Hampshire
- Somerton (disambiguation)
- Summerstown (disambiguation)
- Summerton (disambiguation)
