= Somers Town =

Somers Town or Somerstown may refer to:

- Somers Town, London, a district of London, England
- Somerstown, Portsmouth, a district of Portsmouth, England
- Somers Town (film), a film directed by Shane Meadows

== See also ==
- Summerstown (disambiguation)
