= Portsmouth and Southsea Synagogue =

Orthodox synagogue in Portsmouth, England

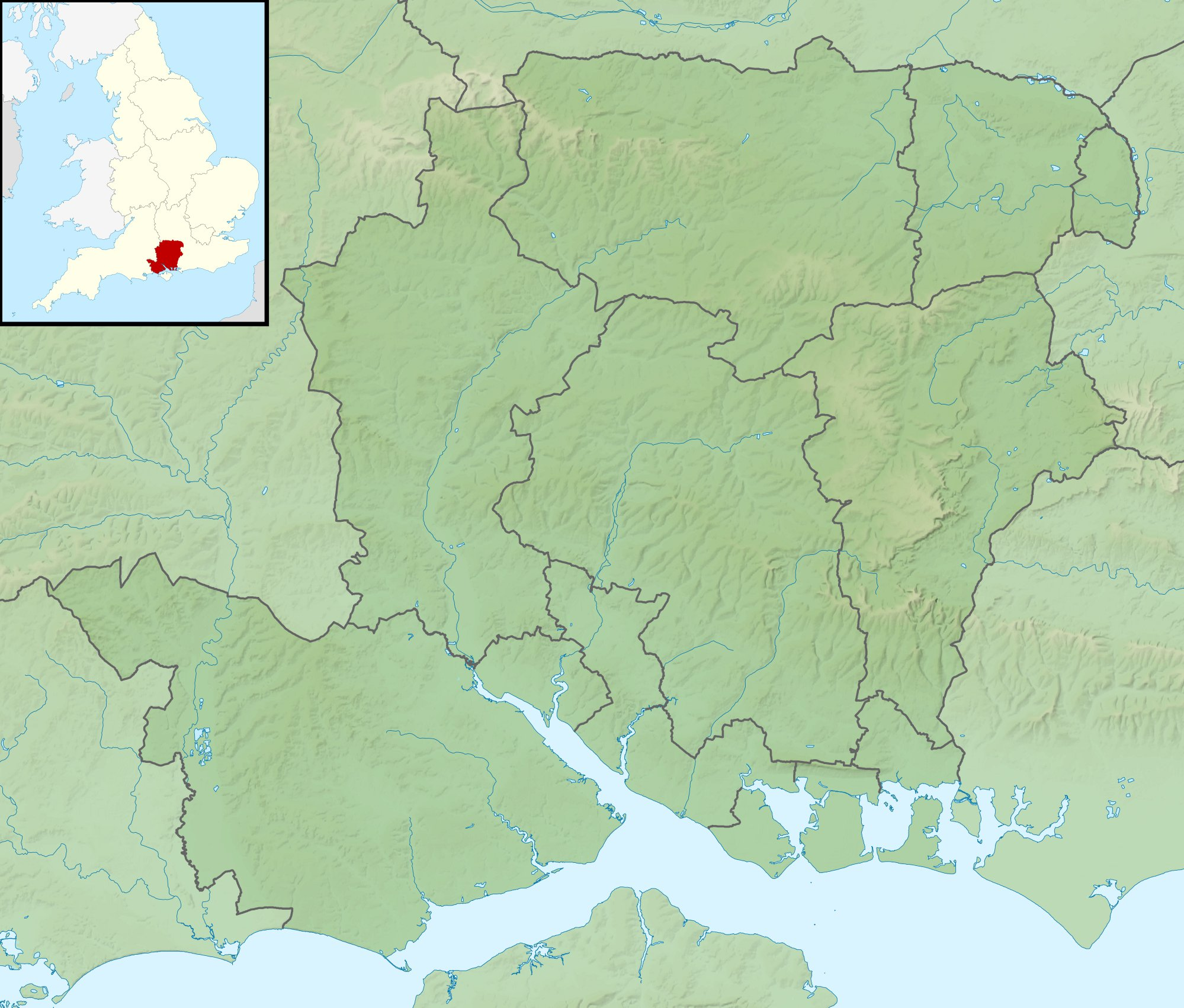
- Location of the synagogue in Hampshire

Religion
- Affiliation: Orthodox Judaism
- Rite: Nusach Ashkenaz
- Ecclesiastical or organizational status: Synagogue
- Leadership: Rev. Gabriel Burns (part-time)
- Status: Active

Location
- Location: The Thickett, Elm Grove, Southsea, Portsmouth, Hampshire, England PO5 2AA
- Country: United Kingdom
- Interactive map of Portsmouth and Southsea Synagogue
- Coordinates: 50°47′20″N 1°05′10″W

Architecture
- Style: House
- Established: c. 1740s (Note: The actual date of founding is uncertain, with claims that a congregation existed in the 1730s in the vicinity of Oyster Street, although this is disputed. Elsewhere there is reference to a synagogue in Oyster Row by the early 1840s.) (as a congregation)
- Completed: 1780 (White's Row/Queens Street); c. 1910 (Elm Grove: private villa); 1936 (Elm Grove: synagogue)
- Materials: Red brick; stucco

The Portsmouth and Southsea Synagogue, also known as the Portsmouth and Southsea Hebrew Congregation, is an Orthodox Jewish congregation and synagogue located at The Thickett, on Elm Grove, Southsea in Portsmouth, Hampshire, England, in the United Kingdom. Formed in c. 1740s, the congregation is one of the oldest Jewish in the United Kingdom. They worship in the Ashkenazi rite.

The part-time rabbi of the congregation, since 2011, is Reverend Gabriel Burns.

== History ==
During the Napoleonic Wars, the commercial activity of Portsmouth as a garrison and naval town attracted a large number of Jews.

In 1780, the congregation built a synagogue on White's Row, expanded and renovated in 1850 and 1876. The congregation moved out of these premises in 1936 into a former private villa in Elm Grove, built in 1910, that was repurposed for use as a synagogue. Many of the fittings from the original 1780 synagogue, including the Ark, were relocated to the current synagogue. The original synagogue building, which until its closure in 1936 was the oldest provincial Synagogue still in use, was destroyed during World War II in an air raid.

In December 1942, a day of mourning, fasting was held in the synagogue for Jewish victims of Nazi massacres. In 1967, in the light of the good relationship which existed between Portsmouth and the Israeli Navy based in Haifa, the synagogue donated a Kiddush cup to the crew of the submarine INS Dakar for its maiden voyage which ended in tragedy when the submarine sank.

== See also ==
- History of the Jews in England
- List of Jewish communities in the United Kingdom
- List of synagogues in the United Kingdom
- List of places of worship in Portsmouth
