= Summerstown =

Summerstown may refer to:

- Summerstown, Buckinghamshire, England
- Summerstown, London, England
- Summerstown, Ontario, Canada

== See also ==
- Somerstown, Hampshire, England
- Somers Town (disambiguation)
- Summertown (disambiguation)
