= St Agatha's, Landport =

Church in Portsmouth, Hampshire, England

St Agatha's Church
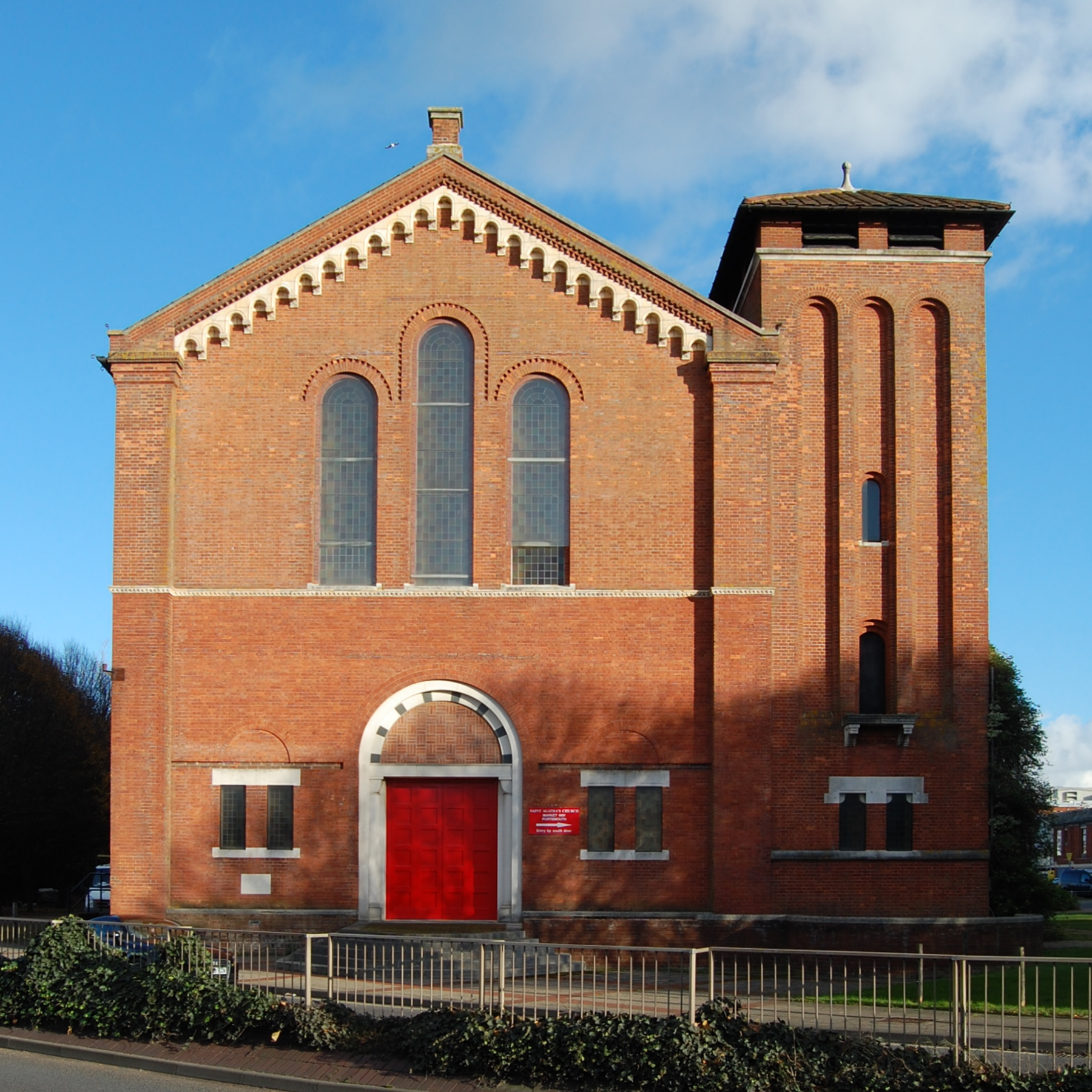
- Façade

Religion
- Affiliation: Catholic Church (since 2012); Previously; Traditional Anglican Communion (1994-2012); Church of England (1894-1954)
- Rite: Anglican Use
- Ecclesiastical or organizational status: Parish Church
- Leadership: Personal Ordinariate of Our Lady of Walsingham; Ordinary: The Revd Msgr David Waller; Rector: The Revd Msgr Robert Mercer

Location
- Location: Landport, Portsmouth, England
- Interactive map of St Agatha's Church
- Coordinates: 50°48′8.22″N 1°5′31.87″W

Architecture
- Architect: Joseph Henry Ball
- Style: Italianate Romanesque
- General contractor: W. R. Light and Son of Southsea
- Groundbreaking: 1838
- Completed: 1894
- Construction cost: £3,250

Website
- sagathasbasilica.com

St Agatha's Church is a parish church in the Landport district of Portsmouth. It is now affiliated to the Roman Catholic Church through the Personal Ordinariate of Our Lady of Walsingham. It is situated on the Marketway next to the Cascades Shopping Centre. It was built between 1893 and 1895 for the Church of England and is a Grade II* listed building.

== History ==
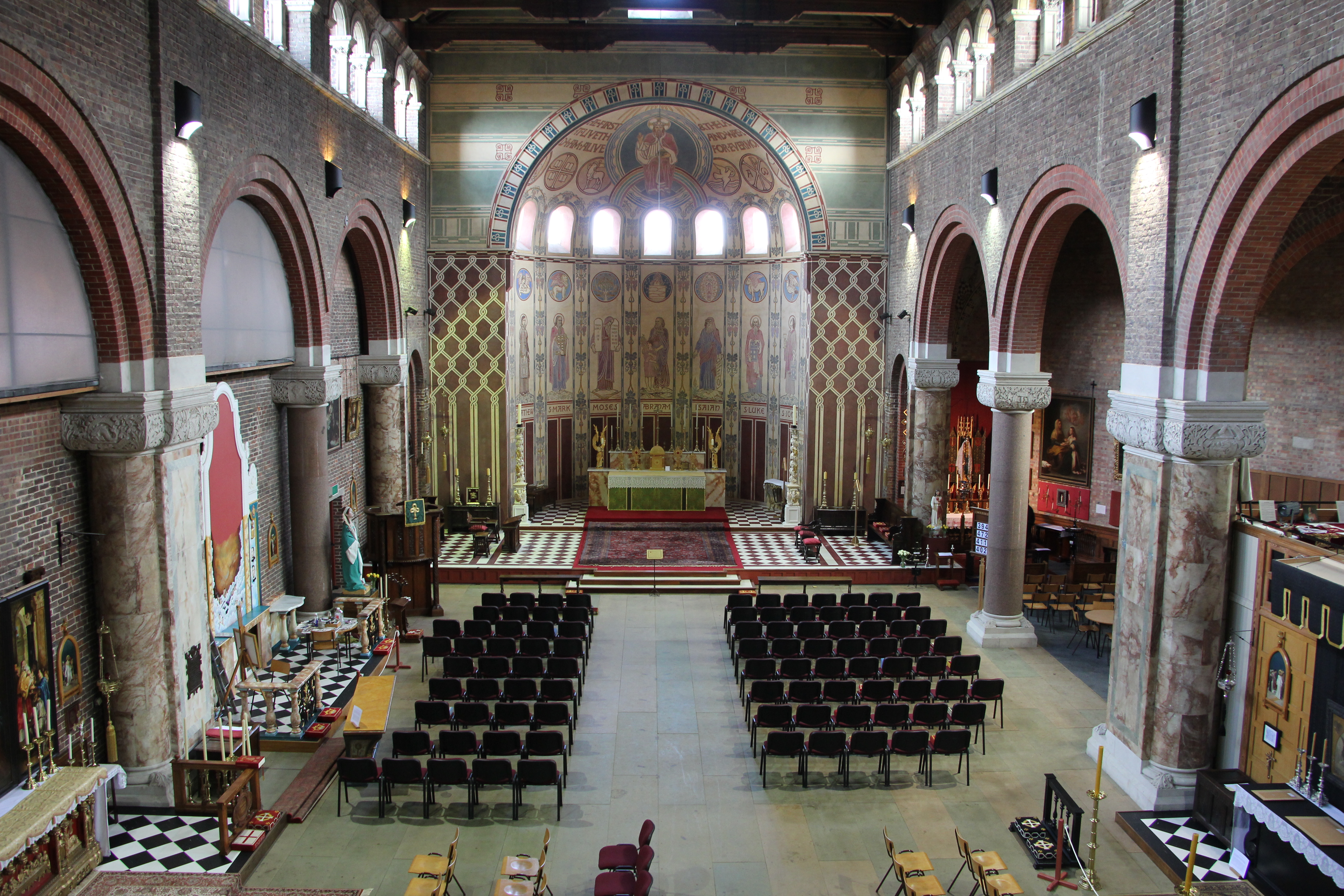
Interior

=== Construction ===
Originally, the site had a small mission church situated in an area of extreme deprivation. The church was built because of the efforts of Father Robert William Radclyffe Dolling, an Irish Anglo-Catholic priest. He worked to alleviate the social ills of the area. At the same time he received donations from the residents of Old Portsmouth to build a new church. Construction began in 1893.

The formal opening of the church took place on 27 October 1895 with a ceremony involving mass being said at the old mission church followed by a procession to the new church, but the nature of the ritual led to a row with the Bishop of Winchester.

=== Establishment ===
Dolling's successor, Father Tremenheere, continued to decorate the interior until 1914 when another long-serving incumbent arrived. Work done during this time included the completion of the murals and the addition of a wooden pulpit. Tremenheere's successor, Father C. W. Coles, was to serve the parish through two world wars until 1954 when the last service was held. In 1964 the church's ladychapel was demolished to allow for road widening.

=== Traditional Anglican Communion ===
For the next 40 years it became a naval store until the Traditional Anglican Communion took it over for a form of worship very similar to that originally provided by Dolling. The church survived this time largely intact although the lady chapel was demolished in 1964.

=== Personal Ordinariate of Our Lady of Walsingham ===
In 2012 the parish joined the Personal Ordinariate of Our Lady of Walsingham, a canonical structure established in 2011 for former Anglicans wishing to convert to Catholicism, while preserving elements of a "distinctive Anglican patrimony".

== Present ==
The church is now also used for concerts. It has been described as a magnificent building, as having a sumptuous interior, and the "Cathedral of the car parks" in Portsmouth's shopping district.

Following the reception of the retired Bishop of Matabeleland, Robert Mercer, who worshipped at the church, into the Personal Ordinariate of Our Lady of Walsingham, and other members of the church's clergy, St Agatha's began to be used as a place of worship for the ordinariate. Much of the church's interior furnishing has been sourced from redundant churches. The high altar is originally from Trinity church in Trinity Church Square via St Matthews in New Kent Road.

The church has one Sunday Mass at 11:00 am. It also has weekday Masses at 11:00 am on Monday, Friday and Saturday.

== See also ==
- List of places of worship in Portsmouth
