= Domus Dei =

Church in Hampshire, England

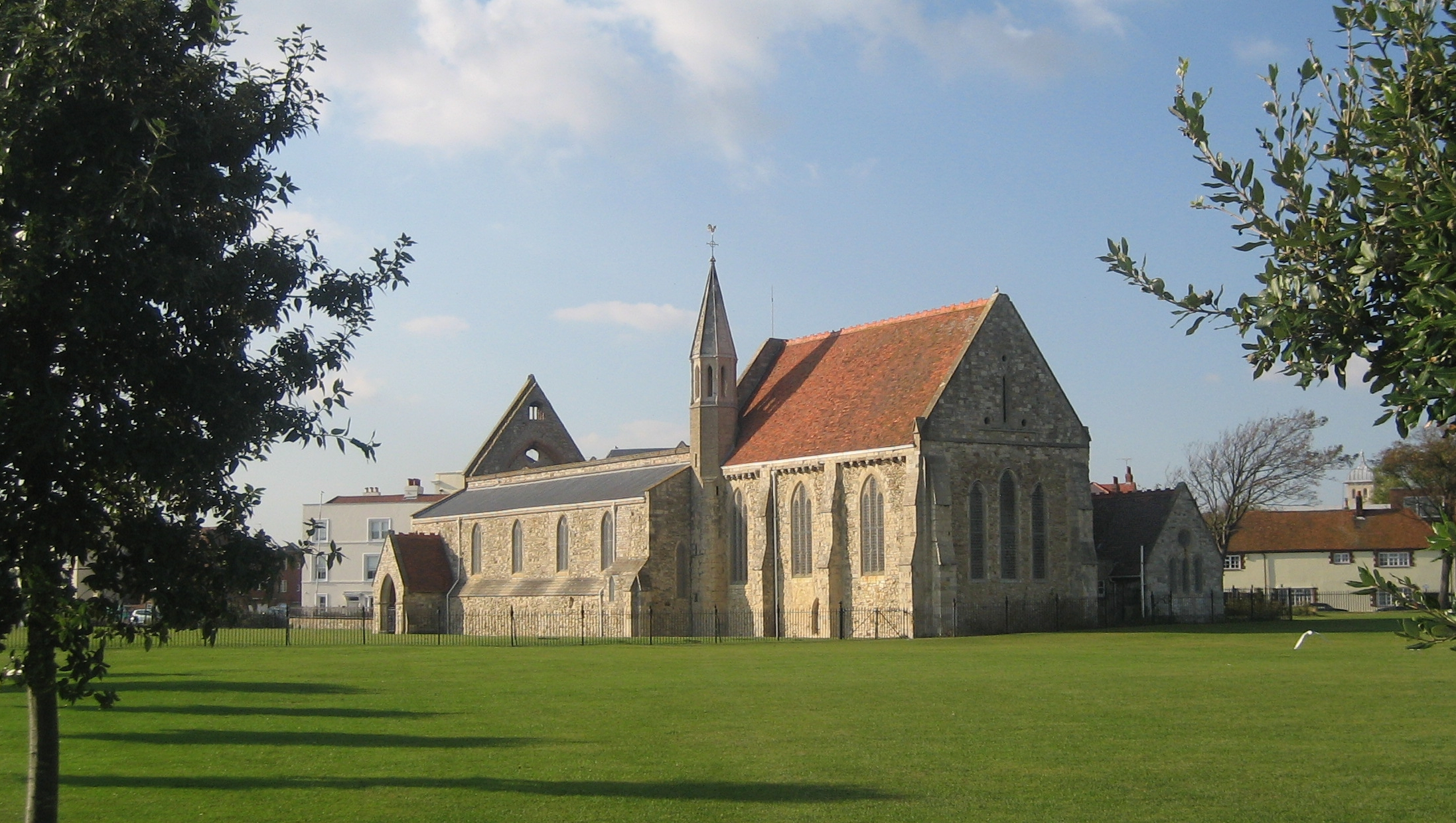

- Location within Hampshire
- 50°47′20″N 1°06′14″W
- Type: Church
- Location: Old Portsmouth
- OS grid reference: SZ 63269 99205

History
- Built: ca 1212

Site notes
- Area: Hampshire
- Architectural style: Early English
- Owner: English Heritage

Listed Building – Grade II
- Official name: Royal Garrison Church
- Designated: 18 Mar 1999
- Reference no.: 1245790

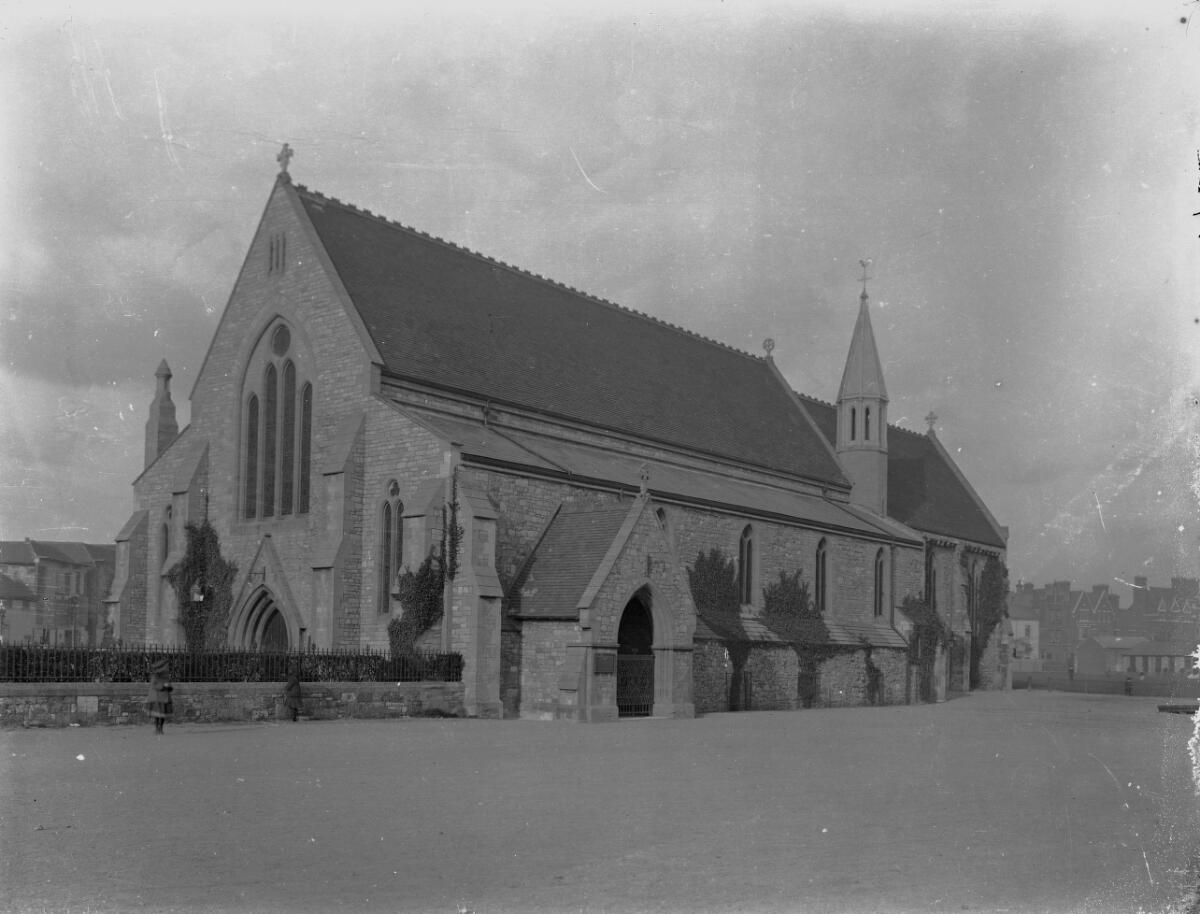
Image of the church from c. 1905, prior to its bombing in 1941.

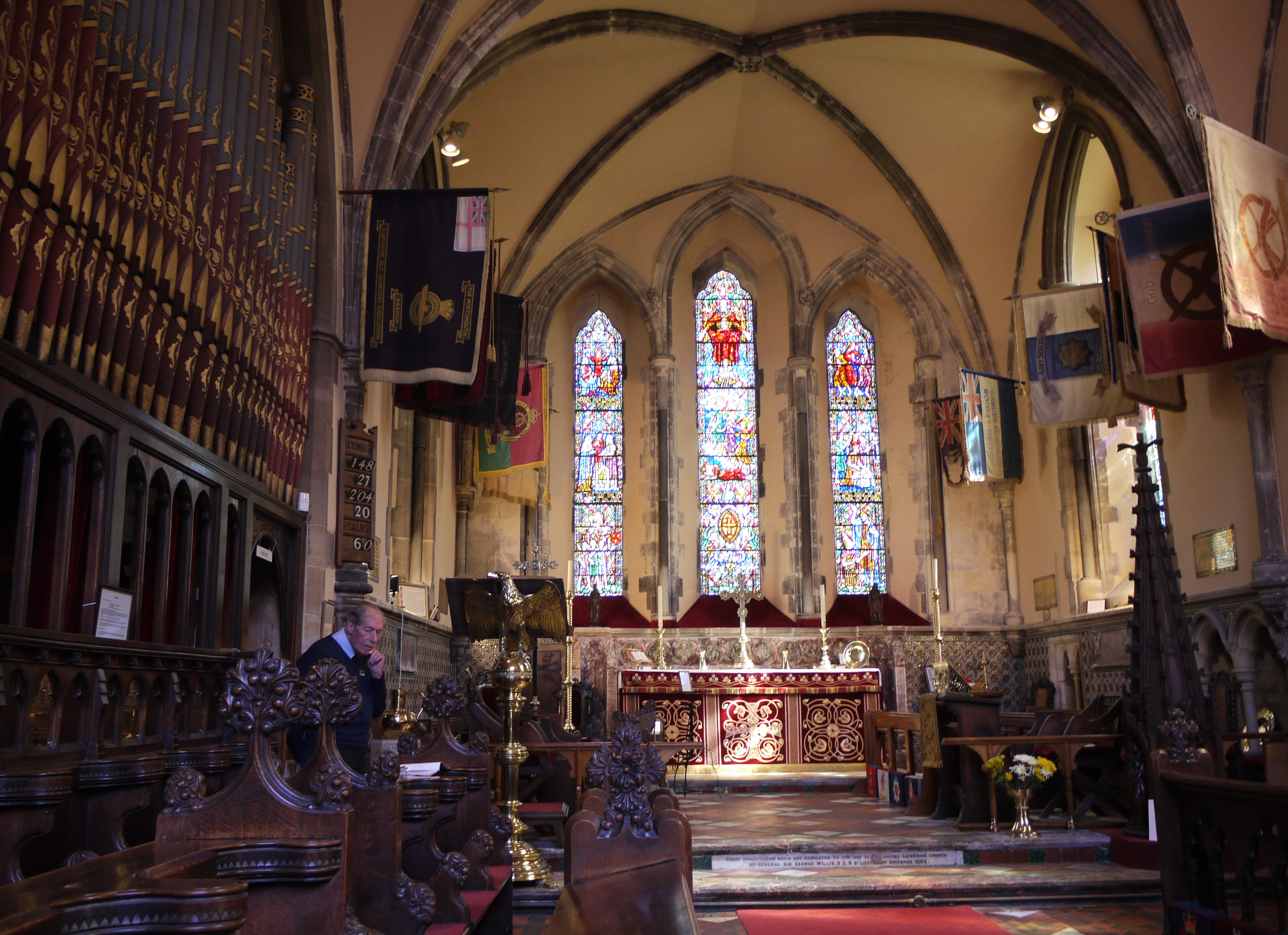
The interior of the church

Domus Dei (Hospital of Saint Nicholas and Saint John the Baptist) was an almshouse and hospice at Old Portsmouth, Hampshire, England. It is now also known as the Royal Garrison Church and is an English Heritage property and a Grade II listed building.

== History ==
The hospice was established by Peter des Roches (sometimes incorrectly named as de Rupibus), Bishop of Winchester and William of Wrotham in around 1212 A.D.

In 1450 an unpopular advisor to the king, Bishop Adam Moleyns of Chichester was conducting a service at the chapel of Domus Dei when a number of naval seamen (resentful of being only partially paid and only provided with limited provisions) burst into the church, dragged out the bishop and murdered him.

As a result of this the entire town of Portsmouth was placed under the Greater Excommunication, an interdict which lasted until 1508, removed at the request of Bishop Foxe of Winchester.

In 1540, like many other chantry buildings, it was seized by King Henry VIII and until 1560 was used as an armoury. After 1560, a mansion built close by the south-side became the home of the local military governor.

In 1662 the mansion hosted the wedding of King Charles II and Princess Catherine of Braganza. In 1814, the Prince Regent hosted at the Governor's house Tsar Alexander I of Russia and King Frederick William III of Prussia, along with several leading Allied military figures following the end of the War of the Sixth Coalition.

Towards the end of the seventeenth century the church building fell into disrepair until it was restored in 1767 to become the Garrison church. Once again, the Church fell into disrepair and in 1865 a new restoration project began under the direction of G. E. Street which lasted ten years.

On 10 January 1941 the buildings of Domus Dei were partially destroyed in an attack by German bombers, when all the stained glass windows were blown out and the nave was rendered roofless by incendiary bombs and a single high explosive bomb. New glazing was subsequently fitted. Apart from the East window with its traditional design, all the other windows show much of the British Army's relationship to the Church and the City of Portsmouth. The chancel is intact, but the nave remains roofless.

The aisles but not the central nave were re-roofed in 1995. In October 2021, the building was one of 142 sites across England to receive part of a £35-million grant from the government's Culture Recovery Fund.

== See also ==
- List of places of worship in Portsmouth
