= Buckland, Portsmouth =

Suburb of Portsmouth, Hampshire, England

Coordinates: 50.810°N 1.075°W

Buckland is a residential area in the city of Portsmouth in the English county of Hampshire.

== History ==
Buckland, then known as Bocheland, was one of the three settlements on Portsea Island mentioned in the Domesday Book. The Manor of Bocheland was purchased by Jean de Gisors. De Gisors, a Norman lord who then founded Portsmouth on land at the southern end of the manor, in 1180. The area was extensively bombed during the Second World War. Due to this, and the slum nature of much of what housing was left, large parts were demolished and replaced with social housing built in the 1950s and '60s. Charles Dickens was born in Buckland in 1812. His father moved to Portsmouth to work at the Naval Base. He bought a terraced house in an area close to the base then called Newtown. The house of his birth is now a museum. It stands in Old Commercial Road which is a street with many listed Georgian and Victorian terraced houses and town houses.

There is no official boundary of Buckland, but the locals usually define it as Kingston Crescent (A2047 westbound) to the north, Kingston Road (A2047 southbound) to the east, Lake Road to the south and Mile End Road to the west. Barkis and Nickelby houses are the most prominent buildings in the neighbourhood standing 17 stories high. Pickwick and Copperfield houses are another set of tower blocks which are 11 stories high. Blackwood and Brisbane houses are mid rise "groundscraper" blocks at 6 stories high located near the busy M275 Mile End Road. All mentioned houses have been used and to some degree still are used as social housing by Portsmouth City Council (exact status unknown). Buckland is now a mixture of terraced houses, modern 2 floor houses, modern two floor per flat - overlapped flats and the houses spread at the southwest corner of Buckland. Population density is high, although the houses or flats are quite small in size and lack comfort most of them are in a decent state.

On the western edge of Buckland sits the Buckland wall, a series of housing blocks built in the 1970s to a design by W.D. Warden the then city architect.

Flying Bull Primary and Nursery School serves the Buckland area.

In the far north west corner of Buckland there is a building that was previously a pub called the Air ballon.
