= A. E. Cogswell =

English architect

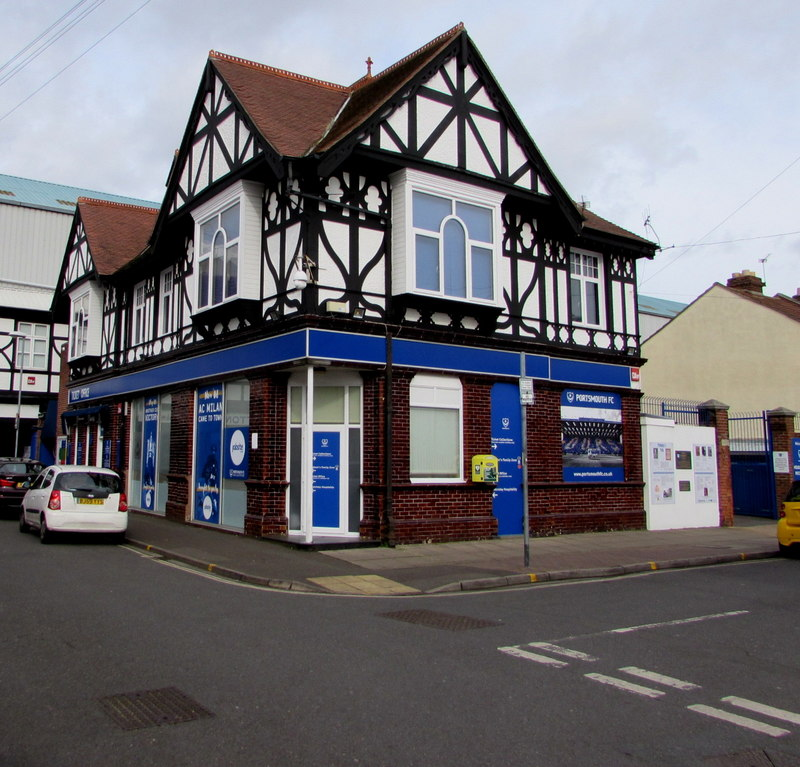
The Pompey pub in Frogmore Road, Portsmouth was designed by Arthur Cogswell in 1900.

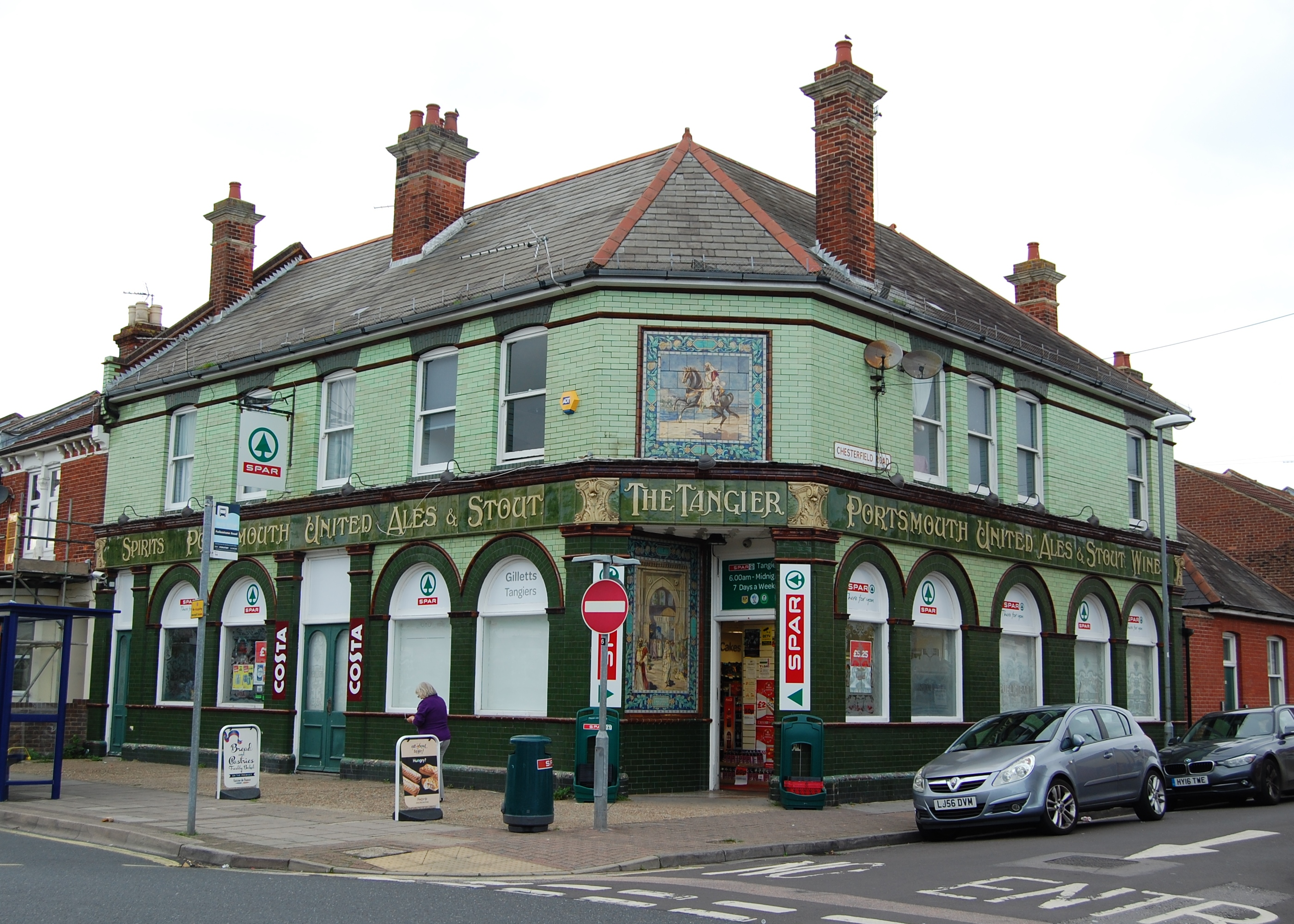
Cogswell designed The Tangier pub in 1912.

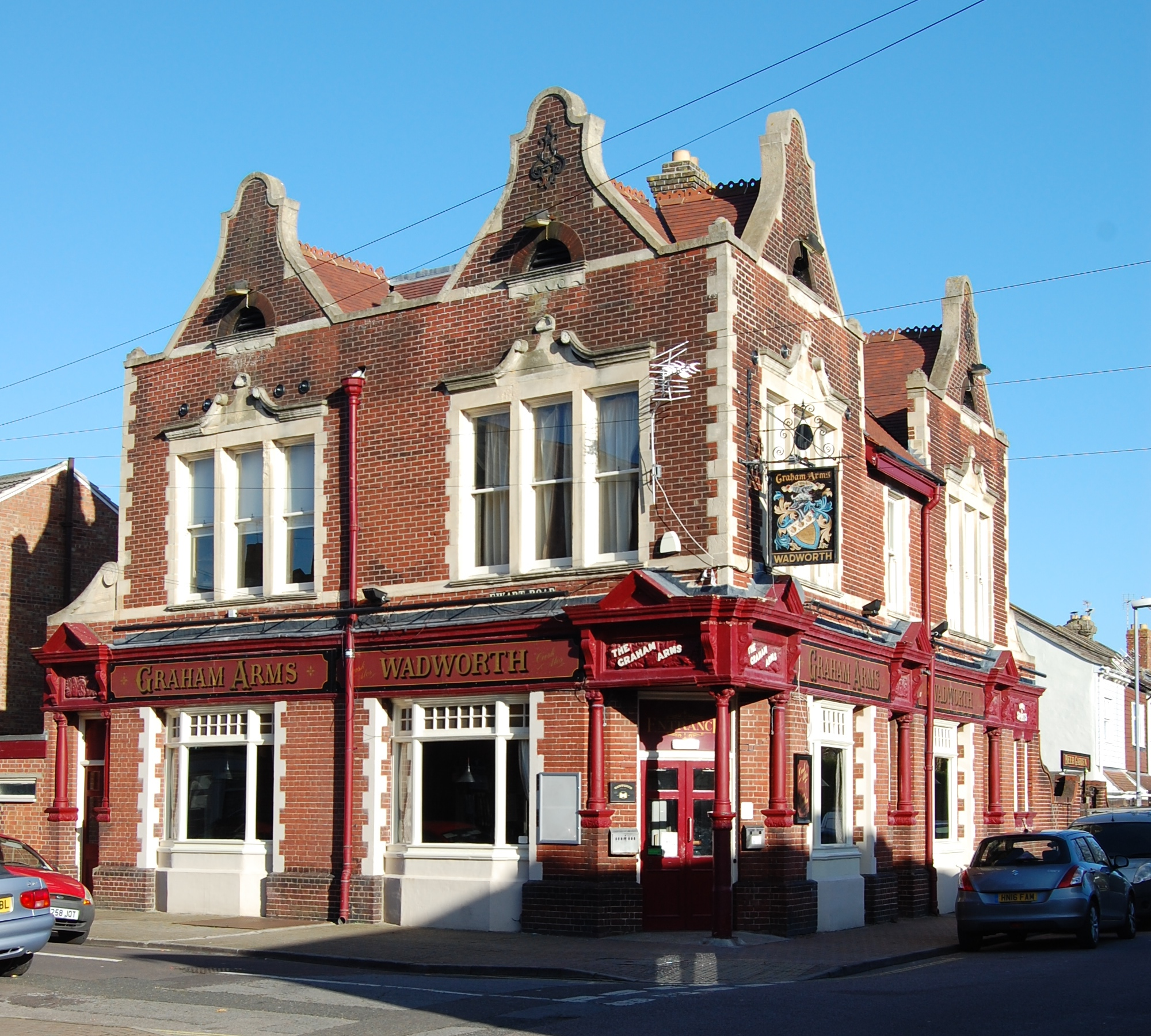
The Graham Arms pub in George Street, Fratton, built in 1900.

Arthur Edward Cogswell (1858, Peterborough – 1934, Portsmouth) was an English architect, particularly active in the Portsmouth area. He was an architect who, although not well known nationally, left a strong mark on the appearance of Portsmouth lasting until this day.

== Career ==
Cogswell, the Peterborough-born son of a wood carver, arrived in Portsmouth in the early 1870s and served an apprenticeship with a prominent local architect, George Rake (1829–1885), with whom he worked on the new jail in Kingston (the former HM Prison Kingston) and Milton Lunatic Asylum (now St James' Hospital). After serving his apprenticeship, Cogswell later became a partner in Rake's business, becoming known as Rake and Cogswell. George Rake died in November 1885, and Cogswell continued the business.

In 1888, Cogswell registered as a Member of the Society of Architects and received his first public commission at Portsmouth's Kingston Cemetery, where Cogswell designed "a new Caretaker's Lodge, Entrance Gate and railings" at the cemetery's northern entrance at New Road, which was opened in 1891.

Arthur Cogswell built a reputation of his own and was a friend of John Brickwood, a fellow Freemason who commissioned him to design many of the Brickwood's public houses in the Portsmouth area. He was also responsible for local shops, banks, churches, schools, cinemas, theatres and, in the early 1900s, the Carnegie Library in Fratton Road to which he gave his services for free. His style is very recognisable throughout the city.

Cogswell designed two cinemas in Portsmouth, the New Classic Cinema and the Palace Cinema, and the Gaiety Cinema in Gosport, all of which have since closed.

He designed over twenty pubs in Portsmouth, including The Talbot at 207 Goldsmith Avenue, Southsea built in 1896 for Brickwood's brewery in Brewer's Tudor style, and the Grade II listed The Tangier, 61/63 Tangier Road, Baffins built in 1912 for Portsmouth United Breweries. Cogswell is also credited for designing the Pompey pub in 1900 for Portsmouth F.C. chairman, John Brickwood. In 1900, he also designed the Glocuester Hotel (later renamed the Dragon Bar and now a Tesco Express). In 1901, the Ship and Castle pub on 'the hard' was rebuilt to his design on the site of a much earlier pub beside the dockyard. The Florist pub was designed by him in 1924, it was built with a Witch tower.

During his career, Cogswell also served with various volunteer regiments of the British Army Reserve. He was a captain in the 2nd Hampshire Royal Garrison Artillery Volunteers, and later served with the Artists Rifles during World War I.

Arthur Edward Cogswell died at the age of 76 in early October 1934, receiving only a 75-word obituary notice in the Portsmouth Evening News, which named him as a "Doyen of City architects" and a "Great Sportsman", but yet received no such recognition from national architectural or trade publications – despite his membership of the Society of Architects. Cogswell's two sons, Victor Cogswell and Douglas Cogswell, carried on the family business, AE Cogswell & Sons, which rebuilt Clarence Pier, Southsea in 1961.

== Portsmouth football connections ==
Cogswell was an enthusiast of association football and founded Portsmouth Association Football Club, an amateur football team which had Sherlock Holmes creator, Arthur Conan Doyle as their goalkeeper, who played under the pseudonym A.C. Smith.

Portsmouth AFC were disbanded in 1896. Although only speculation, many have theorised that Cogswell, a football enthusiast and acquaintance of Brickwood Brewery owner John Brickwood (through his career as a pub architect), may have influenced Brickwood to form a new football club. Brickwood became the chairman of the syndicate which formed Portsmouth Football Club on 5 April 1898.

In 1900, Cogswell built a Brickwoods Brewery public house named "The Pompey" next to Fratton Park at 44 Frogmore Road. The owner of the Brickwoods Brewery was John Brickwood, the first chairman of Portsmouth F.C.
