= Somerton railway station (disambiguation) =

Somerton railway station may refer to:

- Somerton station, on the SEPTA West Trenton Line in Philadelphia, Pennsylvania, United States
- Somerton railway station, Melbourne, Australia, now replaced by Roxburgh Park
- Somerton railway station, a former station in Somerset, England
- Fritwell & Somerton railway station, a former station in Oxfordshire, England
