= Somerstown, Hampshire =

Suburb of Portsmouth, Hampshire, England

Coordinates: 50.792780°N 1.085840°W

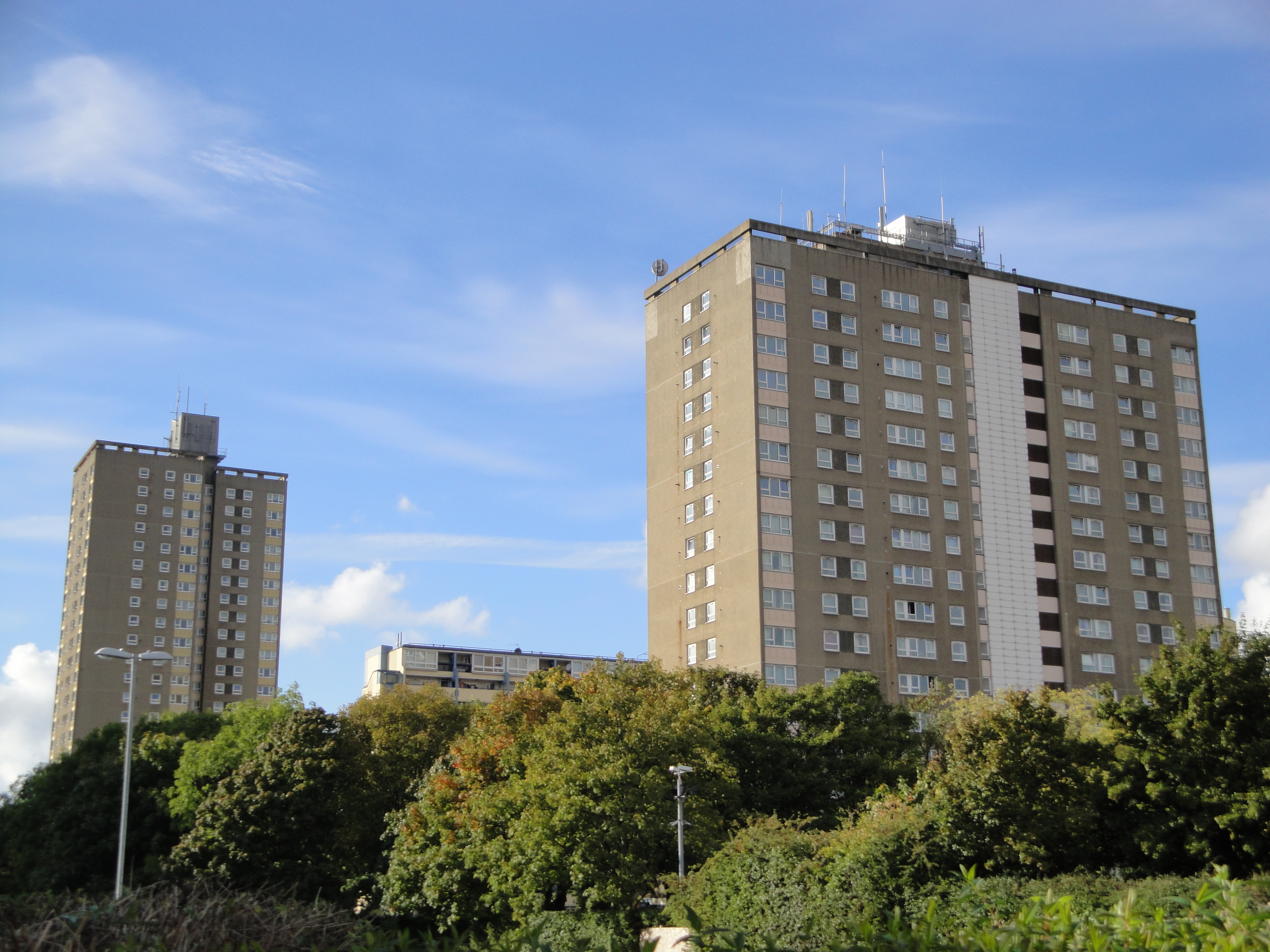
Council flats in Somerstown

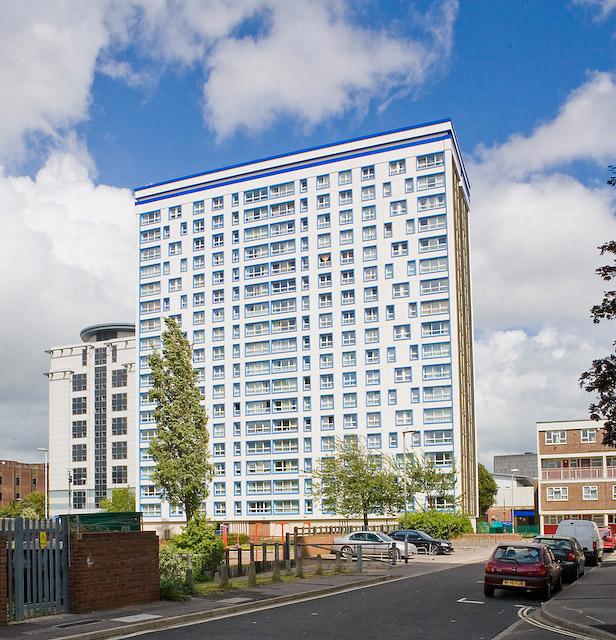
Leamington House, Earlsdon Street, Portsmouth

Somerstown or Somers Town is a residential area of the city of Portsmouth in the English county of Hampshire. The area was one of the most deprived wards in the city, but since 2012, it has been the subject of a major regeneration initiative.

The area was developed during the 1820s, on land owned by Mr Somers, and was heavily bombed during the Second World War. After the war, the majority of what remained of the area was demolished to make way for social housing to a plan by the then city architect F. Mellor. One pre-war survivor was the Castle Tavern originally a 19th century private house.

It is a very run down area of the city, due for redevelopment. This inner city neighbourhood has relatively high levels of deprivation while much of its physical fabric is in need of renewal or refurbishment. It is one of the poorest areas in the South of England and has one of the highest rates of unemployment. The area is an integral part of the "Heart of Portsmouth" bid for SRB funding and a Joint Project Board has been established to oversee the preparation of a new physical regeneration plan through continued community involvement.

On 23 June 2017, Portsmouth City Council confirmed that cladding had started to be removed from two Somers Town tower blocks, Horatia House and Leamington House, which had failed safety tests in the wake of the Grenfell Tower fire. Both blocks were built in 1964-65 and are 18 storeys tall. The blocks have both been since demolished.
