= Grade I listed buildings in Hampshire =

Hampshire shown in England

There are over 9000 Grade I listed buildings in England. This page is a list of the 215 Grade I listed buildings in the county of Hampshire. There are also five Grade I listed parks and gardens which are not listed here.

== Basingstoke and Deane ==
Name	Location	Type	Completed (Note: The date given is the date used by Historic England as significant for the initial building or that of an important part in the structure's description.)	Date designated	Grid ref. (Note: The grid reference is based on the British national grid reference system, sometimes known as OSGB36, used by the Ordnance Survey.) Geo-coordinates	Entry number (Note: The "List Entry Number" is a unique number assigned to each listed building and scheduled monument by Historic England.)	Image
Church of St James	Ashmansworth, Basingstoke and Deane	Church	12th century	16 May 1966	SU4107156631; 51°18′26″N 1°24′44″W	1092445	Church of St James More images
Church of St Catherine	Wolverton, Basingstoke and Deane	Church	Medieval	16 May 1966	SU5518658564; 51°19′25″N 1°12′34″W	1092569	Church of St Catherine More images
Church of St James	Bramley, Basingstoke and Deane	Church	ALL PERIODS	26 April 1957	SU6449458988; 51°19′35″N 1°04′33″W	1093029	Church of St James More images
Barn Approximately 40 Metres South West of Manor Farmhouse	Old Burghclere, Burghclere, Basingstoke and Deane	Threshing Barn	1451-3	18 May 1984	SU4689157966; 51°19′08″N 1°19′43″W	1157463	Upload Photo
Church of All Saints	Old Burghclere, Burghclere, Basingstoke and Deane	Church	c. 1100	16 May 1966	SU4684757868; 51°19′05″N 1°19′45″W	1157301	Church of All Saints More images
Sandham Memorial Chapel	Harts Lane, Burghclere, Basingstoke and Deane	Almshouse	1926	18 May 1984	SU4632960830; 51°20′41″N 1°20′10″W	1339741	Sandham Memorial Chapel More images
Church of All Saints	Dummer, Basingstoke and Deane	Church	c. 1200	26 April 1957	SU5885646017; 51°12′37″N 1°09′32″W	1093019	Church of All Saints More images
Church of All Saints	Hannington, Basingstoke and Deane	Church	Saxon	16 May 1966	SU5385855430; 51°17′44″N 1°13′44″W	1339767	Church of All Saints More images
Church of St Mary the Blessed Virgin	Hartley Wespall, Basingstoke and Deane	Church	14th century	26 April 1957	SU6978458315; 51°19′11″N 1°00′00″W	1339496	Church of St Mary the Blessed Virgin More images
Highclere Castle	Highclere Park, Highclere, Basingstoke and Deane	Country House	1839-42	10 January 1953	SU4463358796; 51°19′35″N 1°21′39″W	1092528	Highclere Castle More images
Jackdaws Castle	Highclere Park, Highclere, Basingstoke and Deane	Folly	c. 1740	16 May 1966	SU4490558796; 51°19′35″N 1°21′25″W	1092530	Jackdaws Castle More images
Milford Lake House	Highclere Park, Highclere, Basingstoke and Deane	Summerhouse	Early 18th century	16 May 1966	SU4502460958; 51°20′45″N 1°21′18″W	1092532	Upload Photo
Church of St Mary	Tufton, Basingstoke and Deane	Church	Saxon	16 May 1966	SU4575046814; 51°13′07″N 1°20′47″W	1175684	Church of St Mary More images
Church of St Nicholas	Freefolk, Laverstoke, Basingstoke and Deane	Church	late medieval	16 May 1966	SU4874048609; 51°14′05″N 1°18′12″W	1092725	Church of St Nicholas More images
Priory Farmhouse	Mapledurwell and Up Nately, Basingstoke and Deane	Farmhouse	17th century	26 April 1957	SU6885452557; 51°16′05″N 1°00′52″W	1339548	Upload Photo
Church of All Saints	Monk Sherborne, Basingstoke and Deane	Church	c. 1140	26 April 1957	SU6083555798; 51°17′53″N 1°07′44″W	1339517	Church of All Saints More images
Pamber Priory Church of the Holy Trinity, Our Lady, and St John the Baptist	Monk Sherborne, Basingstoke and Deane	Church	1843	26 April 1957	SU6089158156; 51°19′09″N 1°07′39″W	1092954	Pamber Priory Church of the Holy Trinity, Our Lady, and St John the Baptist More images
Church of St Swithin	Nately Scures, Newnham, Basingstoke and Deane	Church	12th century	26 April 1957	SU6968253004; 51°16′19″N 1°00′09″W	1092926	Church of St Swithin More images
Church of St Mary	Old Basing and Lychpit, Basingstoke and Deane	Church	Norman	26 April 1957	SU6659752927; 51°16′18″N 1°02′48″W	1339555	Church of St Mary More images
Tithe Barn	Old Basing and Lychpit, Basingstoke and Deane	Tithe Barn	16th century	26 April 1957	SU6612252798; 51°16′14″N 1°03′13″W	1166768	Tithe Barn More images
Berrydown Court	Overton, Basingstoke and Deane	House	1897-8	10 January 1977	SU5260449485; 51°14′32″N 1°14′52″W	1302517	Upload Photo
Berrydown Court Lodge	Overton, Basingstoke and Deane	Carriageway		10 January 1977	SU5261949549; 51°14′34″N 1°14′51″W	1302479	Upload Photo
Berrydown Court Walls to Kitchen Garden, Forecourt, and Roadside Boundary, with Garden Store Buildings	Overton, Basingstoke and Deane	Boundary Wall	1897-8	12 April 1984	SU5259849517; 51°14′33″N 1°14′52″W	1092705	Berrydown Court Walls to Kitchen Garden, Forecourt, and Roadside Boundary, with Garden Store Buildings
Church of St. Andrew	Sherborne St John, Basingstoke and Deane	Church	c. 1150	26 April 1957	SU6235855565; 51°17′45″N 1°06′25″W	1339594	Church of St. Andrew More images
The Vyne	Vyne Park, Sherborne St. John, Basingstoke and Deane	House	1500–1520	26 April 1957	SU6362756816; 51°18′25″N 1°05′19″W	1296972	The Vyne More images
Church of St. Mary	Silchester, Basingstoke and Deane	Church	12th century	26 April 1957	SU6434162366; 51°21′24″N 1°04′39″W	1339600	Church of St. Mary More images
Church of St Peter	St Mary Bourne, Basingstoke and Deane	Church	Norman	16 May 1966	SU4225450315; 51°15′02″N 1°23′45″W	1092390	Church of St Peter More images
Church of St. Mary the Virgin	Stratfield Saye, Basingstoke and Deane	Church	1758	26 April 1957	SU6956161387; 51°20′50″N 1°00′09″W	1167723	Church of St. Mary the Virgin More images
Stratfield Saye House	Stratfield Saye Park, Stratfield Saye, Basingstoke and Deane	House	1640	26 April 1957	SU7001861566; 51°20′56″N 0°59′46″W	1092773	Stratfield Saye House More images
Church of St Peter	Tadley, Basingstoke and Deane	Church	17th century or Earlier	16 May 1966	SU5978559981; 51°20′09″N 1°08′35″W	1092438	Church of St Peter More images
Church of St Mary	Upton Grey, Basingstoke and Deane	Church	12th century	26 April 1957	SU6975048447; 51°13′51″N 1°00′09″W	1296652	Church of St Mary More images
Church of St Michael	Basingstoke and Deane	Church	14th century	3 May 1949	SU6366452186; 51°15′55″N 1°05′20″W	1092618	Church of St Michael More images

== City of Portsmouth ==
Name	Location	Type	Completed	Date designated	Grid ref. Geo-coordinates	Entry number	Image
18 Gun Battery and Flanking Battery, Kings Stairs, Sallyport, Pointbarracks	The Point, City of Portsmouth	Gate	Late 17th century	30 October 1969	SZ6301599308; 50°47′24″N 1°06′27″W	1386892	18 Gun Battery and Flanking Battery, Kings Stairs, Sallyport, Pointbarracks More images
Block Mill and Numbers 35 and 36 Stores (building Number 1/53)	His Majesty's Naval Base, City of Portsmouth	Wall	17th century	13 August 1999	SU6285800814; 50°48′13″N 1°06′34″W	1078288	Block Mill and Numbers 35 and 36 Stores (building Number 1/53) More images
Cathedral Church of St Thomas	Old Portsmouth, City of Portsmouth	Cathedral	1927	10 January 1953	SZ6323299381; 50°47′26″N 1°06′15″W	1333198	Cathedral Church of St Thomas More images
Charles Dickens' Birthplace Museum	Landport, City of Portsmouth	House	Late 18th century	10 January 1953	SU6440801230; 50°48′25″N 1°05′14″W	1103850	Charles Dickens' Birthplace Museum More images
Docks 1 to 6 (consecutive) Quay Walls and Bollards (including North and South Camber Mast Pond and Tunnel to Same)	Her Majesty's Naval Base, City of Portsmouth	Bollard	Mid 19th century	13 August 1999	SU6284300724; 50°48′10″N 1°06′34″W	1272267	Docks 1 to 6 (consecutive) Quay Walls and Bollards (including North and South Camber Mast Pond and Tunnel to Same) More images
Fort Southwick, That Part in Portsmouth Civil Parish	Paulsgrove, City of Portsmouth	Fort	c. 1860	30 October 1969	SU6282306838; 50°51′28″N 1°06′32″W	1104368	Fort Southwick, That Part in Portsmouth Civil Parish More images
Landport Gate	Portsea, City of Portsmouth	Town gate	1760	18 March 1999	SZ6346399717; 50°47′37″N 1°06′03″W	1387159	Landport Gate More images
Number 10 Store (building Number 1/58)	Her Majesty's Naval Base, City of Portsmouth	Museum	c. 1991	13 August 1999	SU6284700479; 50°48′02″N 1°06′34″W	1272284	Number 10 Store (building Number 1/58) More images
Number 11 Store (building Number 1/59)	Her Majesty's Naval Base, City of Portsmouth	Library	1999	13 August 1999	SU6280700540; 50°48′04″N 1°06′36″W	1272285	Number 11 Store (building Number 1/59) More images
Number 9 Store (building Number 1/35)	Her Majesty's Naval Base, City of Portsmouth	Naval storehouse	1782	13 August 1999	SU6288900409; 50°47′59″N 1°06′32″W	1272283	Number 9 Store (building Number 1/35) More images
The Round Tower	The Point, City of Portsmouth	Artillery tower	c. 1415	30 October 1969	SZ6291199373; 50°47′26″N 1°06′32″W	1386901	The Round Tower More images
The Square Tower	The Point, City of Portsmouth	Powder magazine	c. 1580	30 October 1969	SZ6307699247; 50°47′22″N 1°06′23″W	1386904	The Square Tower More images
Portsmouth Naval War Memorial	Southsea, City of Portsmouth	War memorial	1924	23 May 2016	SZ6385298495; 50°46′57″N 1°05′44″W	1386975	Portsmouth Naval War Memorial More images

== City of Southampton ==
Name	Location	Type	Completed	Date designated	Grid ref. Geo-coordinates	Entry number	Image
Bargate and Guildhall	Southampton City Centre	Gate	1180–1200	14 July 1953	SU4199711636; 50°54′10″N 1°24′15″W	1092087	Bargate and Guildhall More images
Canute's Palace	Southampton City Centre	Hall house	Late 12th century	14 July 1953	SU4194811002; 50°53′49″N 1°24′18″W	1340013	Canute's Palace More images
Church of St Julian	Southampton City Centre	Guest house	c. 1185	14 July 1953	SU4204110951; 50°53′47″N 1°24′13″W	1091959	Church of St Julian More images
Church of St Mary	Swaythling	Parish church	12th century	14 July 1953	SU4398815421; 50°56′12″N 1°22′31″W	1179339	Church of St Mary More images
Church of St Michael	Southampton City Centre	Parish church	c. 1070	14 July 1953	SU4192711291; 50°53′58″N 1°24′19″W	1179142	Church of St Michael More images
King John's Palace	Southampton City Centre	Merchants house	c. 1170	14 July 1953	SU4182211285; 50°53′58″N 1°24′24″W	1339942	King John's Palace More images
God's House Gate	Southampton City Centre	Gate	c. 1300	14 July 1953	SU4208810932; 50°53′47″N 1°24′10″W	1340004	God's House Gate More images
Section of Wall Running North from God's House Along Back of the Walls to Round Tower Adjacent to No 15	Southampton City Centre	Angle tower	13th century	14 July 1953	SU4209610976; 50°53′48″N 1°24′10″W	1091982	Section of Wall Running North from God's House Along Back of the Walls to Round Tower Adjacent to No 15 More images
Section of wall running west from Bargate to Arundel Tower and then south to point just south of Castle Water Gate. It includes Arundel Tower, Catchcold Tower, Garderobe Tower, the 40 Steps, Castle Water Gate and Castle Vault, the town walls, Bargate Street the West Gate including portions of town walls and arcades adjoining.	Southampton City Centre	Walls	Medieval	14 July 1953	SU4186411591; 50°54′08″N 1°24′22″W	1340005	Section of wall running west from Bargate to Arundel Tower and then south to point just south of Castle Water Gate. It includes Arundel Tower, Catchcold Tower, Garderobe Tower, the 40 Steps, Castle Water Gate and Castle Vault, the town walls, Bargate Street the West Gate including portions of town walls and arcades adjoining.
Section of Wall Running West from Polymond Tower to Remains of Semi-circular Tower to East of Bargate and Small Part South of Polymond Tower	Southampton City Centre	Walls	Medieval	14 July 1953	SU4209211627; 50°54′09″N 1°24′10″W	1340006	Section of Wall Running West from Polymond Tower to Remains of Semi-circular Tower to East of Bargate and Small Part South of Polymond Tower More images
Sections of Wall Running South Along Esplanade from South-west Corner of Simnel Street to University Air Squadron Headquarters a	Southampton City Centre	Wall	Mid 14th century	8 October 1981	SU4180511253; 50°53′57″N 1°24′25″W	1179282	Sections of Wall Running South Along Esplanade from South-west Corner of Simnel Street to University Air Squadron Headquarters a More images
The Wool House	Southampton City Centre	Storehouse	14th century	14 July 1953	SU4186411064; 50°53′51″N 1°24′22″W	1092060	The Wool House More images
Tudor House Museum	Southampton City Centre	Timber framed house	1491–1518	14 July 1953	SU4186911290; 50°53′58″N 1°24′22″W	1339964	Tudor House Museum More images
Medieval Merchant's House	Southampton City Centre	Merchants house	Late 13th century or early 14th century	14 July 1953	SU4191711180; 50°53′55″N 1°24′19″W	1092048	Medieval Merchant's House More images
Southampton Cenotaph	Southampton City Centre	Cenotaph	1920	8 October 1981	SU4191612408; 50°54′35″N 1°24′19″W	1340007	Southampton Cenotaph More images

== East Hampshire ==
Name	Location	Type	Completed	Date designated	Grid ref. Geo-coordinates	Entry number	Image
Parish Church of St Lawrence	Alton, East Hampshire	Parish Church	Norman	13 March 1951	SU7172239602; 51°09′04″N 0°58′33″W	1338903	Parish Church of St Lawrence More images
Church of the Holy Cross	Binsted, East Hampshire	Parish Church	Early 12th century	31 July 1963	SU7714240938; 51°09′45″N 0°53′53″W	1302151	Church of the Holy Cross More images
West Court Barn	Binsted, East Hampshire	Barn	1296–1304	15 August 1985	SU7658541142; 51°09′52″N 0°54′22″W	1338987	Upload Photo
Jane Austen's House	Chawton, East Hampshire	House	18th century	31 July 1963	SU7083437579; 51°07′59″N 0°59′21″W	1178917	Jane Austen's House More images
All Saints Church	East Meon, East Hampshire	Parish Church	Early 12th century	16 March 1985	SU6806222283; 50°59′45″N 1°01′53″W	1351116	All Saints Church More images
The Court House	East Meon, East Hampshire	Farmhouse	Late 16th century	16 March 1954	SU6813122228; 50°59′44″N 1°01′50″W	1094584	The Court House More images
Rotherfield Park	Rotherfield Park, East Tisted, East Hampshire	Country House	1815-21	18 July 1986	SU6947732305; 51°05′09″N 1°00′34″W	1351139	Rotherfield Park More images
Church of St Mary of the Assumption	Upper Froyle, Froyle, East Hampshire	Parish Church	Early 14th century	31 July 1963	SU7556842870; 51°10′48″N 0°55′13″W	1094095	Church of St Mary of the Assumption More images
Church of the Holy Rood	Empshott, Hawkley, East Hampshire	Parish Church	13th century	16 March 1954	SU7532831244; 51°04′32″N 0°55′34″W	1094477	Church of the Holy Rood More images
Church of St Peter	Petersfield, East Hampshire	Church	2nd quarter of 12th century	29 July 1949	SU7464823187; 51°00′12″N 0°56′15″W	1157381	Church of St Peter More images
Statue of William III	Petersfield, East Hampshire	Statue	18th century	29 July 1949	SU7465123247; 51°00′14″N 0°56′15″W	1093567	Statue of William III More images
St Huberts Chapel	Idsworth, Rowlands Castle, East Hampshire	Parish Church	1053	16 March 1954	SU7427914068; 50°55′17″N 0°56′41″W	1094540	St Huberts Chapel More images
Church of St Mary	The Plestor, Selborne, East Hampshire	Parish Church	c. 1180	3 July 1963	SU7411933780; 51°05′55″N 0°56′34″W	1351131	Church of St Mary More images
The Wakes (including Museum Flat and the Flat)	Selborne, Selborne, East Hampshire	Apartment	17th century	31 July 1963	SU7408333677; 51°05′51″N 0°56′36″W	1174798	The Wakes (including Museum Flat and the Flat) More images
Bedales Memorial Library, Lupton Hall and Corridor	Steep, East Hampshire	School Library	1922	16 March 1954	SU7428925132; 51°01′15″N 0°56′32″W	1278033	Bedales Memorial Library, Lupton Hall and Corridor More images
Church of St James	Upper Wield, Wield, East Hampshire	Cross	c. 1150	31 July 1963	SU6284138753; 51°08′41″N 1°06′11″W	1094078	Church of St James More images

== Fareham ==
Name	Location	Type	Completed	Date designated	Grid ref. Geo-coordinates	Entry number	Image
Church of St Mary	Portchester, Fareham	Church	1710	18 October 1955	SU6253004495; 50°50′12″N 1°06′48″W	1339235	Church of St Mary More images
Monastic Barn of Titchfield Abbey at Fern Hill Farm	Titchfield, Fareham	Tithe Barn	15th century	18 October 1955	SU5395106489; 50°51′19″N 1°14′06″W	1094235	Monastic Barn of Titchfield Abbey at Fern Hill Farm More images
Parish Church of St Peter	Titchfield, Fareham	Parish Church	Possible C8 origins	18 October 1955	SU5409305785; 50°50′57″N 1°13′59″W	1351279	Parish Church of St Peter More images
Portchester Castle	Portchester, Fareham	Castle	During reign of Henry II	18 October 1955	SU6241104667; 50°50′17″N 1°06′54″W	1229190	Portchester Castle More images

== Gosport ==
Name	Location	Type	Completed	Date designated	Grid ref. Geo-coordinates	Entry number	Image
'A' Magazine, Museum Buildings, Priddy's Hard	Gosport	Boundary wall	1770 to 1776	19 January 1990	SU6164101237; 50°48′27″N 1°07′36″W	1276026	'A' Magazine, Museum Buildings, Priddy's Hard More images
'B' Magazine (north and south Stores) and attached Passage and Boundary Wall, and Main Rolling Way and Attached Foreman's Office, Priddy's Hard	Gosport	Cooperage	1773	19 January 1990	SU6165501256; 50°48′27″N 1°07′35″W	1393247	'B' Magazine (north and south Stores) and attached Passage and Boundary Wall, and Main Rolling Way and Attached Foreman's Office, Priddy's Hard More images
Gunboat Sheds and Workshops	Gosport	Sheds and workshops	1856	14 June 2016	SZ6172198973; 50°47′13″N 1°07′33″W	1431190	Gunboat Sheds and Workshops More images
Church of St Mary	Rowner, Gosport	Church	13th century	20 April 1983	SU5840801634; 50°48′41″N 1°10′20″W	1276419	Church of St Mary More images

== Hart ==
Name	Location	Type	Completed	Date designated	Grid ref. Geo-coordinates	Entry number	Image
Bramshill House	Bramshill, Hart	Steps	1605–1612	8 July 1952	SU7587659630; 51°19′51″N 0°54′44″W	1340025	Bramshill House More images
Garden Walls and Gateways North of Bramshill House	Bramshill House, Bramshill, Hart	Garden Walls	Early 17th century	8 July 1952	SU7595859597; 51°19′49″N 0°54′40″W	1340026	Garden Walls and Gateways North of Bramshill House
Gateway to Bramshill House	Bramshill House, Bramshill, Hart	Gate	Early 17th century	8 July 1952	SU7597059697; 51°19′53″N 0°54′39″W	1091938	Upload Photo
High Bridge	Bramshill House, Bramshill, Hart	Bridge	Early 19th century	8 July 1952	SU7538659347; 51°19′42″N 0°55′10″W	1091941	High Bridge More images
Walls and Turrets South of Bramshill House	Bramshill House, Bramshill, Hart	Tower	Early 17th century	26 June 1987	SU7580559566; 51°19′49″N 0°54′48″W	1091939	Walls and Turrets South of Bramshill House
All Saints Church, Crondall	Crondall, Hart	Church	before 1200	24 November 1961	SU7947848483; 51°13′48″N 0°51′47″W	1091946	All Saints Church, Crondall More images
Dogmersfield Park (house)	Dogmersfield Park, Dogmersfield, Hart	Bishops Palace	Medieval	8 July 1952	SU7713251599; 51°15′30″N 0°53′46″W	1092357	Dogmersfield Park (house) More images
Church of St Mary	Eversley, Hart	Church	Medieval	24 November 1961	SU7791060917; 51°20′31″N 0°52′58″W	1092339	Church of St Mary More images
Warbrook House	Eversley, Hart	House	1727	8 July 1952	SU7739561829; 51°21′01″N 0°53′24″W	1260096	Warbrook House More images
Mattingley Church	Mattingley Green, Mattingley, Hart	Church	15th century	24 November 1961	SU7363958024; 51°19′00″N 0°56′41″W	1272800	Mattingley Church More images
Church of All Saints	Odiham, Hart	Church	13th century	24 November 1961	SU7403950923; 51°15′10″N 0°56′26″W	1092160	Church of All Saints More images
Odiham Castle	Odiham, Hart	Keep	1207–1214	24 November 1961	SU7255751873; 51°15′41″N 0°57′41″W	1092165	Odiham Castle More images
Church of St Mary	Winchfield, Hart	Church	Norman	24 November 1961	SU7679853603; 51°16′35″N 0°54′01″W	1244705	Church of St Mary More images

== Havant ==
Name	Location	Type	Completed	Date designated	Grid ref. Geo-coordinates	Entry number	Image
Church of St Peter	Hayling Island, Havant	Parish Church	Transitional	16 May 1952	SU7308703201; 50°49′25″N 0°57′49″W	1155352	Church of St Peter More images
Church of St Thomas à Becket	Warblington, Havant	Parish Church	Saxon	16 May 1952	SU7290005418; 50°50′37″N 0°57′57″W	1154443	Church of St Thomas à Becket More images

== New Forest ==
Name	Location	Type	Completed	Date designated	Grid ref. Geo-coordinates	Entry number	Image
Church of the Blessed Virgin and Child	Beaulieu, New Forest	Church	Early/Mid 13th century	8 October 1959	SU3883202548; 50°49′16″N 1°27′00″W	1156943	Church of the Blessed Virgin and Child More images
Domus and Ruins of Lay Frater	Beaulieu Manor Estate, Beaulieu, New Forest	Abbey	Late 13th century	8 October 1959	SU3879602579; 50°49′17″N 1°27′02″W	1156631	Domus and Ruins of Lay Frater More images
Palace House	Beaulieu Manor Estate, Beaulieu, New Forest	Abbey	Mid 14th century	8 October 1959	SU3873002445; 50°49′13″N 1°27′06″W	1094430	Palace House More images
Remains of Outer Wall Around Cloister and Foundations of Abbey Church	Beaulieu Manor Estate, Beaulieu, New Forest	Abbey	Late 13th century	8 October 1959	SU3883002591; 50°49′18″N 1°27′00″W	1094429	Remains of Outer Wall Around Cloister and Foundations of Abbey Church More images
Remains of St Leonard's Chapel	St Leonard's, Beaulieu, New Forest	Chapel	14th century	8 October 1959	SZ4052798207; 50°46′55″N 1°25′35″W	1094415	Remains of St Leonard's Chapel More images
St Leonard's Barn	St Leonard's, Beaulieu, New Forest	Barn	14th century	8 October 1959	SZ4064898164; 50°46′54″N 1°25′29″W	1157008	St Leonard's Barn More images
Hinton Admiral House	Hinton Park, Bransgore, New Forest	Country House	1720	30 September 1964	SZ2085395944; 50°45′46″N 1°42′21″W	1095030	Hinton Admiral House More images
Church of St Mary	Breamore Park, Breamore, New Forest	Parish Church	Late 10th century	30 September 1964	SU1532818896; 50°58′09″N 1°46′59″W	1094934	Church of St Mary More images
Church of St George	Damerham, New Forest	Parish Church	12th century	13 February 1987	SU1075315809; 50°56′30″N 1°50′54″W	1094925	Church of St George More images
Church of St Mary	Ellingham, New Forest	Parish Church	13th century	30 September 1964	SU1442508323; 50°52′27″N 1°47′47″W	1156533	Church of St Mary More images
Church of All Saints	Fawley, New Forest	Tower	c. 1175	8 October 1959	SU4575403553; 50°49′47″N 1°21′06″W	1351239	Church of All Saints More images
Church of St Mary	Fordingbridge, New Forest	Parish Church	12th century	30 September 1964	SU1451513813; 50°55′25″N 1°47′41″W	1350974	Church of St Mary More images
Church of St Mary	Hale Park, Hale, New Forest	Parish Church	Medieval origins	30 September 1964	SU1784218655; 50°58′01″N 1°44′50″W	1094881	Church of St Mary More images
Hale House, Including Quadrant Passages to Pavilions	Hale Park, Hale, New Forest	Country House	1715	30 April 1955	SU1794718577; 50°57′59″N 1°44′45″W	1301070	Hale House, Including Quadrant Passages to Pavilions More images
Church of St Michael and All Angels	Lyndhurst, New Forest	Parish Church	1858-68	13 May 1987	SU2980508168; 50°52′20″N 1°34′40″W	1094725	Church of St Michael and All Angels More images
Church of All Saints	Martin, New Forest	Parish Church	12th century	30 September 1964	SU0705019559; 50°58′31″N 1°54′03″W	1094828	Church of All Saints More images
Church of All Saints	Milford-on-Sea, New Forest	Church	late Norman	22 December 1973	SZ2905592109; 50°43′40″N 1°35′23″W	1276161	Church of All Saints More images
Church of All Saints	Minstead, New Forest	Church	Early 19th century	8 October 1959	SU2810510878; 50°53′48″N 1°36′06″W	1094732	Church of All Saints More images
Barn Formerly Chapel 20 Metres East of Manor House	Manor Farm, Rockbourne, New Forest	Chapel	13th century	30 September 1964	SU1156318371; 50°57′53″N 1°50′12″W	1167857	Barn Formerly Chapel 20 Metres East of Manor House More images
Church of St Andrew	Manor Farm, Rockbourne, New Forest	Parish Church	13th century	30 September 1964	SU1155818319; 50°57′51″N 1°50′12″W	1296677	Church of St Andrew More images
Large Barn 50 Metres North East of Manor House	Manor Farm, Rockbourne, New Forest	House	15th century	30 September 1964	SU1155818395; 50°57′54″N 1°50′12″W	1351003	Large Barn 50 Metres North East of Manor House More images
Manor Farm and Wall Running North East	Manor Farm, Rockbourne, New Forest	Hall House	14th century	30 September 1964	SU1153418341; 50°57′52″N 1°50′14″W	1351002	Manor Farm and Wall Running North East More images
Avon Tyrrell House	Avon Tyrrell, Sopley, New Forest	Country House	1891	12 March 1987	SU1853100257; 50°48′06″N 1°44′18″W	1350922	Avon Tyrrell House More images
Church of All Saints	Thorney Hill, Sopley, New Forest	Church	1906	24 September 1985	SZ1970099724; 50°47′48″N 1°43′19″W	1302198	Church of All Saints More images

== Rushmoor ==
Name	Location	Type	Completed	Date designated	Grid ref. Geo-coordinates	Entry number	Image
Abbey Church of St Michael	Rushmoor	Church	1886-7	28 January 1959	SU8727856078; 51°17′50″N 0°44′58″W	1155639	Abbey Church of St Michael More images
Building Q121 at Former Royal Aircraft Establishment Site	Rushmoor	Workshop	1934–1935	4 December 1996	SU8678754709; 51°17′06″N 0°45′25″W	1259589	Building Q121 at Former Royal Aircraft Establishment Site More images
Building R133 at Former Royal Aircraft Establishment site	Rushmoor	Test House	1939–1942	4 December 1996	SU8686154824; 51°17′09″N 0°45′21″W	1259586	Building R133 at Former Royal Aircraft Establishment site More images
Main Building to Farnborough Hill Convent	Rushmoor	House	1863	13 November 1975	SU8718856449; 51°18′02″N 0°45′03″W	1303116	Main Building to Farnborough Hill Convent More images

== Test Valley ==
Name	Location	Type	Completed	Date designated	Grid ref. Geo-coordinates	Entry number	Image
Church of St Mary the Virgin	Abbotts Ann, Test Valley	Parish Church	1716	20 December 1960	SU3304343575; 51°11′26″N 1°31′43″W	1228703	Church of St Mary the Virgin More images
Church of St Mary the Less	Chilbolton, Test Valley	Parish Church	Norman	20 December 1960	SU3948140219; 51°09′36″N 1°26′12″W	1339283	Church of St Mary the Less More images
Church of St Michael and All Angels	Knights Enham, Enham Alamein, Test Valley	Church	Norman	24 February 1950	SU3618048075; 51°13′51″N 1°29′00″W	1093461	Church of St Michael and All Angels More images
Church of St Peter	Goodworth Clatford, Test Valley	Parish Church	Norman	20 December 1960	SU3661542533; 51°10′51″N 1°28′39″W	1339285	Church of St Peter More images
Church of St Leonard	Grateley, Test Valley	Parish Church	Norman	24 October 1984	SU2756241970; 51°10′35″N 1°36′26″W	1093259	Church of St Leonard More images
Church of St Peter	Hurstbourne Tarrant, Test Valley	Parish Church	Late 12th century	20 December 1960	SU3852452990; 51°16′29″N 1°26′57″W	1093367	Church of St Peter More images
Church of St Peter and St Paul	Kimpton, Test Valley	Church	13th century	21 December 1960	SU2811446625; 51°13′05″N 1°35′56″W	1093222	Church of St Peter and St Paul More images
Marshcourt School	Marsh Court, King's Somborne, Test Valley	Country House	1901–5	29 May 1957	SU3566033594; 51°06′02″N 1°29′32″W	1093803	Marshcourt School More images
Church of St Nicholas	Middleton, Longparish, Test Valley	Parish Church	c. 1200	20 December 1960	SU4257043907; 51°11′34″N 1°23′32″W	1339297	Church of St Nicholas More images
Church of St Andrew	Mottisfont, Test Valley	Parish Church	12th century	29 May 1957	SU3259426749; 51°02′21″N 1°32′11″W	1172913	Church of St Andrew More images
Mottisfont Abbey House	Mottisfont Abbey, Mottisfont, Test Valley	Country House	16th century	29 May 1957	SU3270426965; 51°02′28″N 1°32′06″W	1093730	Mottisfont Abbey House More images
Barn 40 Metres East of Berry Court Farmhouse	Nether Wallop, Test Valley	Farmyard	15th century	27 November 1984	SU3023735638; 51°07′09″N 1°34′10″W	1339452	Barn 40 Metres East of Berry Court Farmhouse
Church of St Andrew	Nether Wallop, Test Valley	Parish Church	11th century	29 May 1957	SU3039636398; 51°07′34″N 1°34′01″W	1339423	Church of St Andrew More images
Grove Place House, Northcliffe School	Grove Place, Nursling and Rownhams, Test Valley	Country House	Mid 16th century	29 May 1957	SU3668016759; 50°56′57″N 1°28′45″W	1339157	Grove Place House, Northcliffe School More images
Abbey Church of St Mary	Romsey, Test Valley	Abbey	until circa 1230	28 August 1951	SU3509321257; 50°59′23″N 1°30′05″W	1092649	Abbey Church of St Mary More images
King John's House	Romsey, Test Valley	Abbey	Medieval	28 August 1951	SU3521921280; 50°59′23″N 1°29′59″W	1231745	King John's House More images
Broadlands House	Broadlands Estate, Romsey Extra, Test Valley	Country House	Elizabethan	29 May 1957	SU3539120242; 50°58′50″N 1°29′50″W	1166489	Broadlands House More images
Middle Bridge	Romsey Extra, Test Valley	Bridge	1788	28 August 1951	SU3492220680; 50°59′04″N 1°30′14″W	1339680	Middle Bridge More images
Church of St Peter and St Paul	Thruxton, Test Valley	Parish Church	13th century	20 December 1960	SU2888445588; 51°12′32″N 1°35′16″W	1093204	Church of St Peter and St Paul More images
Church of St Margaret	Wellow, Test Valley	Parish Church	Early 13th century	29 May 1957	SU3028620397; 50°58′56″N 1°34′12″W	1339214	Church of St Margaret More images
Stable Block (30 Yards South of Wherwell Priory)	Wherwell, Test Valley	Abbey	2nd quarter of 13th century	21 March 1984	SU3917740671; 51°09′50″N 1°26′28″W	1093391	Upload Photo

== Winchester ==
Name	Location	Type	Completed	Date designated	Grid ref. Geo-coordinates	Entry number	Image
Church of All Saints	Bighton, Winchester	Parish Church	12th century	5 December 1955	SU6101634481; 51°06′23″N 1°07′47″W	1155172	Church of All Saints More images
Church of St Nicholas	Bishops Sutton, Winchester	Parish Church	12th century	5 December 1955	SU6059932016; 51°05′03″N 1°08′10″W	1350825	Church of St Nicholas More images
Church of St Nicholas	Boarhunt, Winchester	Parish Church	c. 1064	6 March 1967	SU6034008281; 50°52′15″N 1°08′38″W	1350613	Church of St Nicholas More images
Fort Nelson	Fort Nelson, Boarhunt, Winchester	Fort	1860s	22 December 1971	SU6069607203; 50°51′40″N 1°08′20″W	1350616	Fort Nelson More images
Church of St Michael	Cheriton, Winchester	Church	13th century	5 December 1955	SU5819328474; 51°03′10″N 1°10′16″W	1303010	Church of St Michael More images
Church of St Andrew	Chilcomb, Winchester	Parish Church	1120-40	5 December 1955	SU5071627919; 51°02′54″N 1°16′40″W	1095907	Church of St Andrew More images
Corhampton Church	Corhampton, Winchester	Parish Church	c. 1020	6 March 1967	SU6100120323; 50°58′45″N 1°07′57″W	1179686	Corhampton Church More images
Church of St Mary and All Saints	Droxford, Winchester	Parish Church	Norman	6 March 1967	SU6077418210; 50°57′36″N 1°08′10″W	1095540	Church of St Mary and All Saints More images
Church of St Peter and St Paul	Hambledon, Winchester	Parish Church	Saxon	24 September 1987	SU6463315180; 50°55′57″N 1°04′54″W	1301325	Church of St Peter and St Paul More images
Church of St Swithun	Headbourne Worthy, Winchester	Parish Church	Saxon	5 December 1955	SU4874031991; 51°05′07″N 1°18′20″W	1350461	Church of St Swithun More images
Church of St John	Hursley, Winchester	Church	12th century	27 November 1984	SU3973127443; 51°02′42″N 1°26′05″W	1178648	Church of St John More images
Cranbury House	Cranbury Park, Hursley, Winchester	Country House	1790	27 November 1984	SU4462523242; 51°00′25″N 1°21′55″W	1095809	Cranbury House More images
Avington House	Avington, Winchester	Country House	Late 16th century	5 December 1955	SU5325532323; 51°05′16″N 1°14′28″W	1095887	Avington House More images
Church of St Mary	Easton, Winchester	Parish Church	c. 1200	5 December 1955	SU5091332258; 51°05′15″N 1°16′28″W	1095898	Church of St Mary More images
Church of St Mary	Avington, Winchester	Parish Church	1768-71	5 December 1955	SU5328832252; 51°05′14″N 1°14′26″W	1350483	Church of St Mary More images
The Grange	Grange Park, Northington, Winchester	Country House	1670-3	5 December 1955	SU5622136154; 51°07′19″N 1°11′53″W	1095216	The Grange More images
Godsfield Chapel adjacent to Godsfield Farmhouse	Old Alresford, Winchester	House	Late 14th century	16 November 1983	SU6043137048; 51°07′46″N 1°08′16″W	1350808	Upload Photo
Marwell Hall	Marwell Zoo Park, Owslebury, Winchester	Country House	14th century	5 December 1955	SU5085821779; 50°59′35″N 1°16′36″W	1350871	Marwell Hall More images
New Place	Shedfield, Winchester	Country House	1906	3 February 1952	SU5665813537; 50°55′07″N 1°11′43″W	1095660	New Place More images
Church of St Peter	Soberton, Winchester	Parish Church	Norman	6 March 1967	SU6108216840; 50°56′52″N 1°07′55″W	1166968	Church of St Peter More images
Church of St James Without the Priory Gate	Southwick, Southwick and Widley, Winchester	Church	Earlier	6 March 1967	SU6259408644; 50°52′26″N 1°06′42″W	1167160	Church of St James Without the Priory Gate More images
Fort Southwick	Portsdown Hill, Southwick and Widley, Winchester	Fort	1860s	24 September 1987	SU6287306997; 50°51′33″N 1°06′29″W	1167213	Fort Southwick More images
Church of St Andrew	Tichborne, Winchester	Parish Church	Mid 11th century	5 December 1955	SU5687230259; 51°04′08″N 1°11′23″W	1178485	Church of St Andrew More images
Church of Our Lady	Warnford, Winchester	Parish Church	Saxon	6 March 1967	SU6225122659; 51°00′00″N 1°06′51″W	1296978	Church of Our Lady More images
St John's House	Warnford, Winchester	Aisled House	13th century	6 March 1967	SU6229622647; 50°59′59″N 1°06′49″W	1350308	St John's House More images
Church of St Michael	Stoke Charity, Wonston, Winchester	Parish Church	c. 1190	5 December 1955	SU4887839271; 51°09′02″N 1°18′09″W	1302427	Church of St Michael More images
Avebury House	Winchester	House	1690	24 March 1950	SU4808829614; 51°03′50″N 1°18′55″W	1173668	Avebury House More images
Cart Shed to West of Hyde Abbey Gateway and adjoining it	Winchester	Cart Shed	12th century	14 January 1974	SU4814630142; 51°04′07″N 1°18′51″W	1296399	Cart Shed to West of Hyde Abbey Gateway and adjoining it More images
Cathedral Church of the Holy Trinity	Winchester	Chapter House	Norman	24 March 1950	SU4822129254; 51°03′38″N 1°18′48″W	1095509	Cathedral Church of the Holy Trinity More images
Cheyney Court	Winchester	Timber Framed House	15th century	24 March 1950	SU4817529079; 51°03′33″N 1°18′50″W	1095517	Cheyney Court More images
Porter's Lodge	Winchester	Lodge	15th century	24 March 1950	SU4816729084; 51°03′33″N 1°18′51″W	1296925	Porter's Lodge More images
Church of St John the Baptist	Winchester	Church	c. 1200	14 January 1974	SU4870129446; 51°03′44″N 1°18′23″W	1296158	Church of St John the Baptist More images
City Bridge	Winchester	Bridge	1813	24 March 1950	SU4860229298; 51°03′39″N 1°18′28″W	1167781	City Bridge More images
School - St Mary's College	Winchester	School	1692	24 March 1950	SU4821828918; 51°03′27″N 1°18′48″W	1167544	School - St Mary's College More images
Sick House, St Mary's College	Winchester	School	1656	24 March 1950	SU4811328837; 51°03′25″N 1°18′54″W	1350685	Sick House, St Mary's College More images
Warden's Lodgings, St Mary's College	Winchester	House	Late 14th century	24 March 1950	SU4828028967; 51°03′29″N 1°18′45″W	1167489	Warden's Lodgings, St Mary's College More images
Chapel, St Mary's College	Winchester	School	Late 14th century	24 March 1950	SU4825928940; 51°03′28″N 1°18′46″W	1350684	Chapel, St Mary's College More images
Chamber Court with Middle Gate, St Mary's College	Winchester	Tower	1387	24 March 1950	SU4823928980; 51°03′29″N 1°18′47″W	1296879	Chamber Court with Middle Gate, St Mary's College More images
Cloisters, St Mary's College	Winchester	School	Late 14th century	24 March 1950	SU4823528913; 51°03′27″N 1°18′47″W	1296887	Cloisters, St Mary's College More images
College Hall, St Mary's College	Winchester	School Hall	Late 14th century	24 March 1950	SU4822828950; 51°03′28″N 1°18′48″W	1095484	College Hall, St Mary's College More images
Outer Court with Outer Gate, St Mary's College	Winchester	Gate	Late 14th century	24 March 1950	SU4825029013; 51°03′30″N 1°18′46″W	1095483	Outer Court with Outer Gate, St Mary's College More images
Fromond's Chantry, St Mary's College	Winchester	School	15th century	24 March 1950	SU4825128910; 51°03′27″N 1°18′46″W	1095485	Fromond's Chantry, St Mary's College More images
Close Boundary Walls and Gates, Priors Gate	Winchester	Gate	15th century	24 March 1950	SU4814229184; 51°03′36″N 1°18′52″W	1095512	Close Boundary Walls and Gates, Priors Gate More images
Dome Alley	The Close, Winchester	House	Built soon after 1660	24 March 1950	SU4751629417; 51°03′44″N 1°19′24″W	1095518	Dome Alley More images
Great Hall, Winchester Castle	Winchester	Castle	1232–1240	24 March 1950	SU4776729477; 51°03′46″N 1°19′11″W	1351065	Great Hall, Winchester Castle More images
Hospital of St Cross and Almshouses of Noble Poverty	Winchester	Courtyard	1136	24 March 1950	SU4760727750; 51°02′50″N 1°19′20″W	1095374	Hospital of St Cross and Almshouses of Noble Poverty More images
Hyde Abbey Gateway	Winchester	Gate	15th century	24 March 1950	SU4816030131; 51°04′07″N 1°18′51″W	1095419	Hyde Abbey Gateway More images
The Church of St Swithun Upon Kingsgate	Winchester	Church (Note: Kingsgate is a scheduled monument. The church above the gate is a Grade I listed building.)	14th century	24 March 1950	SU4814429092; 51°03′33″N 1°18′52″W	1095355	The Church of St Swithun Upon Kingsgate More images
Minster House	Winchester	House	Early 18th century	24 March 1950	SU4805629355; 51°03′42″N 1°18′56″W	1350671	Minster House More images
Garden Wall to the South of Minster House on the East and South Sides of the Garden	Winchester	Garden Wall	18th century	14 January 1974	SU4805929320; 51°03′40″N 1°18′56″W	1095459	Garden Wall to the South of Minster House on the East and South Sides of the Garden More images
Part of the City, Palace and Castle Wall Running East from Priory Gate to Angle near to Hall above Magdalen Hospital	City Wall, Winchester	Gate	13th century	24 March 1950	SU4858529256; 51°03′38″N 1°18′29″W	1095505	Part of the City, Palace and Castle Wall Running East from Priory Gate to Angle near to Hall above Magdalen Hospital More images
Pilgrims' Hall	Winchester	Meeting Hall	13th century to 14th century	24 March 1950	SU4825029108; 51°03′33″N 1°18′46″W	1095516	Pilgrims' Hall More images
Pilgrims' School	Winchester	School	Late 17th century to early 18th century	24 March 1950	SU4823229083; 51°03′33″N 1°18′47″W	1167387	Pilgrims' School More images
St John's Rooms and Chapel	Winchester	Chapel	13th century	24 March 1950	SU4849229361; 51°03′42″N 1°18′34″W	1095441	St John's Rooms and Chapel More images
The Carnery	Winchester	Charnel House	14th century	24 March 1950	SU4811229288; 51°03′39″N 1°18′53″W	1350679	The Carnery More images
The Deanery, Incorporating Prior's Hall	Winchester	Deanery	14th century to 15th century	24 March 1950	SU4820929173; 51°03′36″N 1°18′48″W	1095514	The Deanery, Incorporating Prior's Hall More images
The Judge's Lodging	4 The Close, Winchester	House	Late 17th century to early 18th century	24 March 1950	SU4817029132; 51°03′34″N 1°18′51″W	1350657	The Judge's Lodging More images
The Old Stables	The Close, Winchester	Stable	Probably Early 16th century	24 March 1950	SU4819029089; 51°03′33″N 1°18′50″W	1350656	The Old Stables More images
War Cloister, Winchester College	Winchester	War memorial	1924	24 March 1950	SU4811928905; 51°03′27″N 1°18′53″W	1095486	War Cloister, Winchester College More images
The Westgate	Winchester	Gate	13th century	24 March 1950	SU4781229576; 51°03′49″N 1°19′09″W	1350695	The Westgate More images
Wolvesey Castle	Winchester	Bishops Palace	1129–1171	24 March 1950	SU4845929088; 51°03′33″N 1°18′36″W	1095511	Wolvesey Castle More images
Wolvesey Palace	Winchester	Bishops Palace	1684	24 March 1950	SU4840329068; 51°03′32″N 1°18′39″W	1095510	Wolvesey Palace More images
No 4 St Peter Street	Winchester	House	17th century	14 January 1974	SU4807529575; 51°03′49″N 1°18′55″W	1095390	No 4 St Peter Street
No 1 The Close	Winchester	House	1699	24 March 1950	SU4827429204; 51°03′37″N 1°18′45″W	1095513	No 1 The Close More images
No. 9 The Close	Winchester	House	Early 17th century	24 March 1950	SU4813829168; 51°03′35″N 1°18′52″W	1350677	No. 9 The Close More images
No. 10 The Close	The Close, Winchester	House	18th century	24 March 1950	SU4814329211; 51°03′37″N 1°18′52″W	1095475	No. 10 The Close More images
No. 11 The Close	Winchester	House	mid/Late 17th century	24 March 1950	SU4812129266; 51°03′39″N 1°18′53″W	1350678	No. 11 The Close More images

== See also ==
- Category:Grade I listed buildings in Hampshire
- Grade II* listed buildings in Hampshire
