= Landport (disambiguation) =

Landport is a district located near the centre of Portsea Island and is part of the city of Portsmouth, England.

Landport is also a suburb of Lewes, Sussex, England

Landport may also refer to:

- Landport (Gibraltar), a gate into the territory of Gibraltar
- King James's and Landport Gates, two English Heritage gateways in Portsmouth, Hampshire, England.
- Land port of entry, a land border checkpoint
- Landport Company, Inc., subsidiary of Rose City Transit, former mass transit service in Portland, Oregon, U.S.
