= Ark Charter Academy =

Location
- Hyde Park Road; Landport; Portsmouth, Hampshire, PO5 4HL; England
- Coordinates: 50.7966°N 1.0879°W

Information
- Type: Academy
- Religious affiliation: Church of England
- Established: 1865
- Trust: Ark Schools
- Department for Education URN: 135965 Tables
- Ofsted: Reports
- Principal: Christian Down
- Gender: Co-educational
- Age: 11 to 18
- Website: http://www.charteracademy.org.uk/

Ark Charter Academy (formerly St Luke's CofE VA Secondary School) is a co-educational Church of England secondary school and sixth form. The school is located in the Landport area of Portsmouth in the English county of Hampshire.

== History ==
St Luke's School was first established in 1865 as a sunday school for boys. It began to offer more general secondary education for boys and girls in 1922. During World War II, pupils attending the school were largely evacuated to the Isle of Wight, however the school remained open for the remaining students. The school buildings suffered from extensive bomb damage during the war, and new buildings were constructed during the 1960s. This allowed for a significant expansion in the schools capacity.

St Luke's went through a period of decline during the 1990s and 2000s, with pupils continuously achieving some of the poorest results in the UK. The school was put into special measures by Ofsted, and the school was threatened with closure. St Luke's was reopened as Charter Academy in September 2009, becoming one of the first schools to become an academy. The school brought in a head teacher with experience of tackling poor achievement and behaviour in London schools. They also recruited a team of ex Royal Navy sailors as pastoral support to provide discipline. Results at the school have significantly improved from being to in the bottom 3% of schools nationally with no pupils achieve 5 A*-Cs to 68% of its pupils now achieving those grades placing it above the national average and making it one of the top three schools in the city. The school was later rebranded Ark Charter Academy

== The school today ==
Ark Charter Academy is sponsored by Ark and the Anglican Diocese of Portsmouth. Though it is a Church of England school, Ark Charter Academy operates a non-selective intake policy from a catchment area rather than selecting on religious background. The school offers GCSEs, BTECs and OCR Nationals as programmes of study for pupils, while students in the sixth form have the option to study from a range of A-levels. The school also has specialisms in mathematics and performing arts.
