= The Wool House =

Medieval building in Hampshire, England

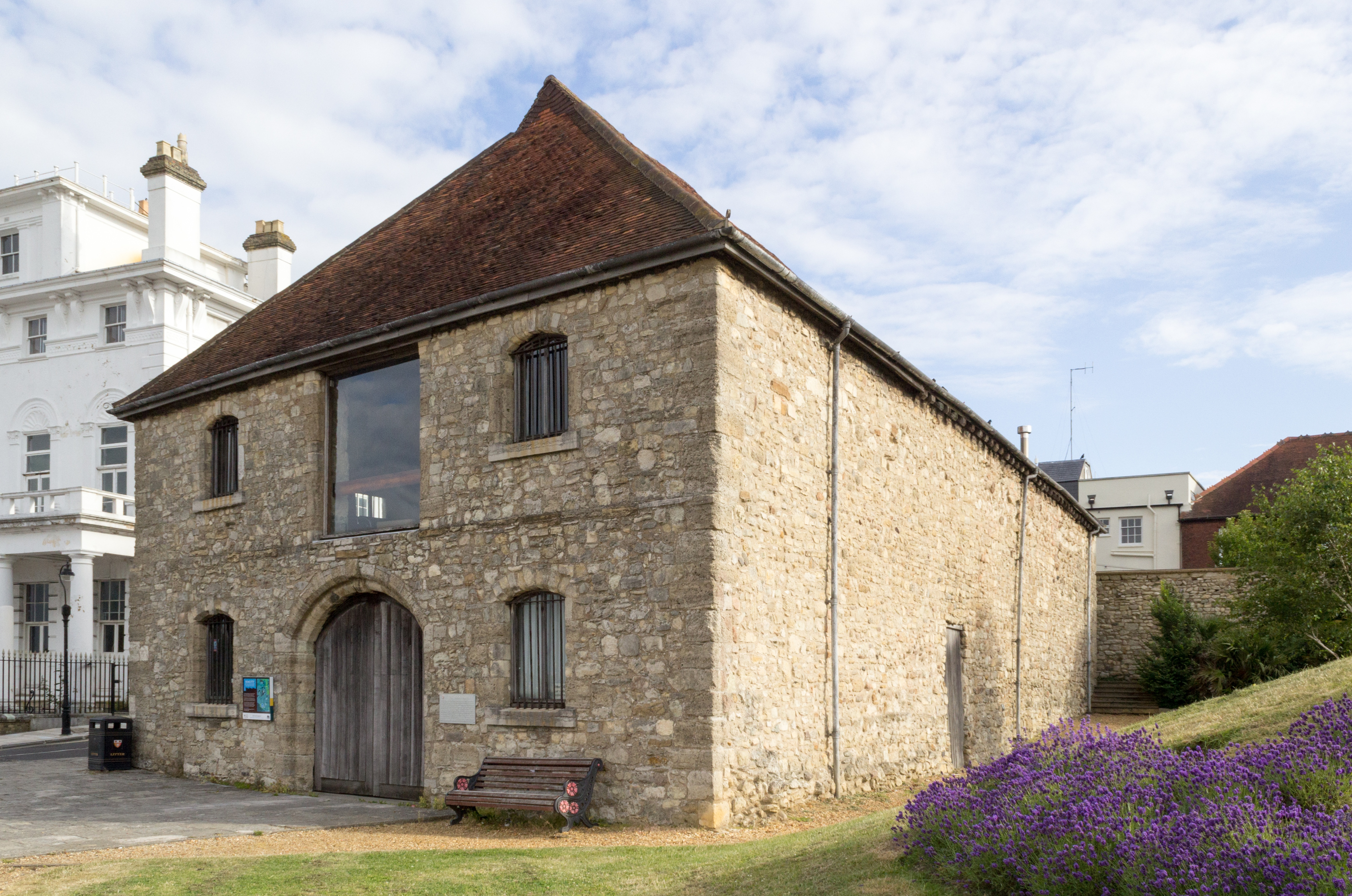

- Location within Southampton
- 50°53′51″N 1°24′22″W
- Type: Warehouse
- Location: Bugle Street, Southampton
- OS grid reference: SU4186211222

History
- Built: Late 14th Century

Site notes
- Area: Hampshire
- Owner: Southampton City Council

Listed Building – Grade I
- Official name: The Wool House
- Designated: 14 July 1953
- Reference no.: 1092060

The Wool House is a medieval building in Southampton, Hampshire, England, which was built to serve the wool trade. It has since had various uses.

== History ==
The Wool House was built in the late 14th century to store wool for export to Italy. In the early 19th century it was used as a prison for Napoleonic French prisoners of war. The building was restored by Southampton City Corporation and adapted to house the Southampton Maritime Museum, which opened in June 1966 and moved to SeaCity Museum in January 2012. It is a Grade I listed building.

A plaque on the wall of The Wool House records its history:

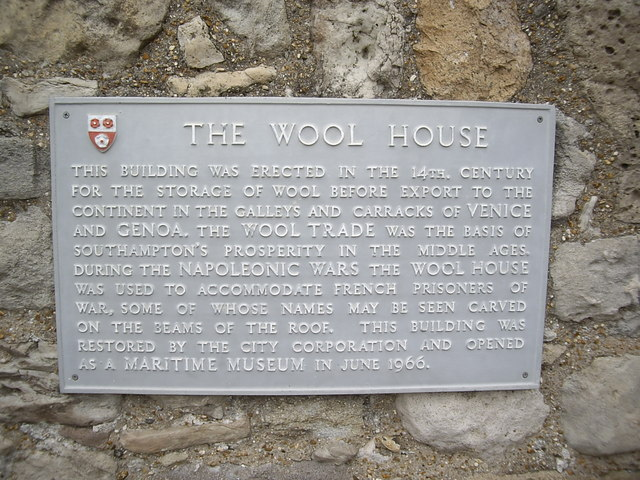
The Wool House plaque

This building was erected in the 14th century for the storage of wool before export to the continent in the galleys and carracks of Venice and Genoa. The wool trade was the basis of Southampton's prosperity in the middle ages. During the Napoleonic wars The Wool House was used to accommodate French prisoners of war, some of whose names may be seen carved on the beams of the roof. This building was restored by the city corporation and opened as a Maritime Museum in June 1966.

During the early part of the 20th century, the premises were occupied by The Moonbeam Engineering Company Limited who built motor launches and later expanded to include the sale of wrought iron propellers and marine engines for export around the world. Edwin Moon used a corner of the workshop to realise his dream of constructing and flying an aircraft of his own design which he flew from land at North Stoneham in 1910, on fields which subsequently became Southampton International Airport.

The Maritime Museum, housed here from 1966 to 2012, documented the maritime heritage of Southampton and the Solent area, its history as a base for ocean liners and in particular its connections to RMS Titanic. Its mission statement was: "To collect, preserve, display and interpret artefacts and information to reflect the widest range of history of the city and its people; to promote enjoyment, awareness of the engagement with Southampton's heritage, via the presentation of the life of the city and its people."

In June 2013, The Wool House was opened up by Element Arts, a pop-up arts organisation, who used the space as a gallery and community arts venue featuring exhibitions and live events - music, dance, poetry, theatre, plus workshops for all ages. Element Arts had the Wool House for a short time on a rolling month by month basis. Plans were approved in 2014 to allow the Dancing Man Brewery to turn the building into a microbrewery and pub. The Wool House reopened on 27 February 2015 as a brewpub/restaurant.

== See also ==
- History of Southampton
- Solent Sky
