= Portsmouth Point =

Area of Portsmouth in Hampshire, England

Coordinates: 50.792°N 1.106°W

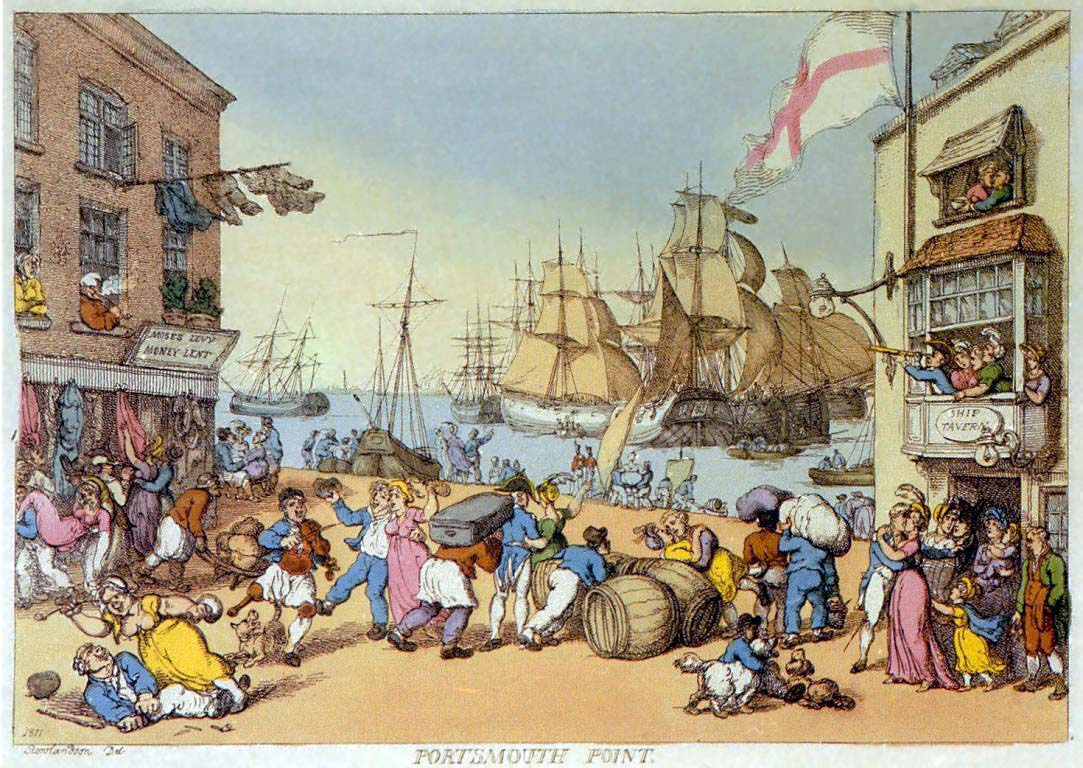
Portsmouth Point, an etching by Thomas Rowlandson.

Portsmouth Point, or "Spice Island", is part of Old Portsmouth in Portsmouth, Hampshire, on the southern coast of England. The name Spice Island comes from the area's seedy reputation, as it was known as the "Spice of Life". Men were easily found and press-ganged into Nelson's navy from Portsmouth Point due to its hostelries and for being where prostitutes plied their trade. The area forms the eastern side of the narrow entrance to Portsmouth Harbour, facing Gosport on the western side.

== History ==
Historically, the Point lay outside the boundaries of Portsmouth, with access being controlled by various fortifications over the centuries. Walls and gates separating the point from the rest of Portsmouth are attested in the 16th century. By 1571 the gate was known as the north gate. It was rebuilt as Point Gate sometime around 1600 before being renamed King James's Gate after further work in 1687. On the south side military defences protecting the harbour entrance were built.

Civilian building in the area began in 1590 with storehouses of various types. During the 17th century an increasing range of businesses had taken hold in the area with four taverns being recorded by 1610. By the 18th century the point had become a popular destination for sailors on leave from ships moored at Spithead. This resulted in the area becoming notorious for lewd behaviour and was mainly composed of pubs and brothels, and appeared as such in Thomas Rowlandson's etching named after the Point. This etching was also the inspiration for William Walton's musical piece of the same name, written in 1925 for full orchestra.

The advent of steam meant that more ships entered Portsmouth Harbour proper and as a result fewer sailors visited the point. The gates that controlled access to the point were removed in the 1860s.

Now the area is part of the desirable and historic city of Portsmouth containing the majority of the remaining early defences of the city and Camber Dock. In 2015, the Land Rover BAR America's Cup race headquarters - now Ineos Team UK - was completed. The nearby Camber Dock still retains a small fishing fleet and a fish market.

A magazine published by the Portsmouth Grammar School is named after the Point.

== "Pompey" ==
The Portsmouth Point name was commonly contracted to Po'm. P. when handwritten in ships logbooks to save time and space, which gave rise to the nickname of "Pompey" for Portsmouth Point. Pompey is also the present day nickname of the city of Portsmouth, the naval base and the professional football club - although there are many alternative theories of the Pompey nickname origin in these three contexts.

== Gallery ==
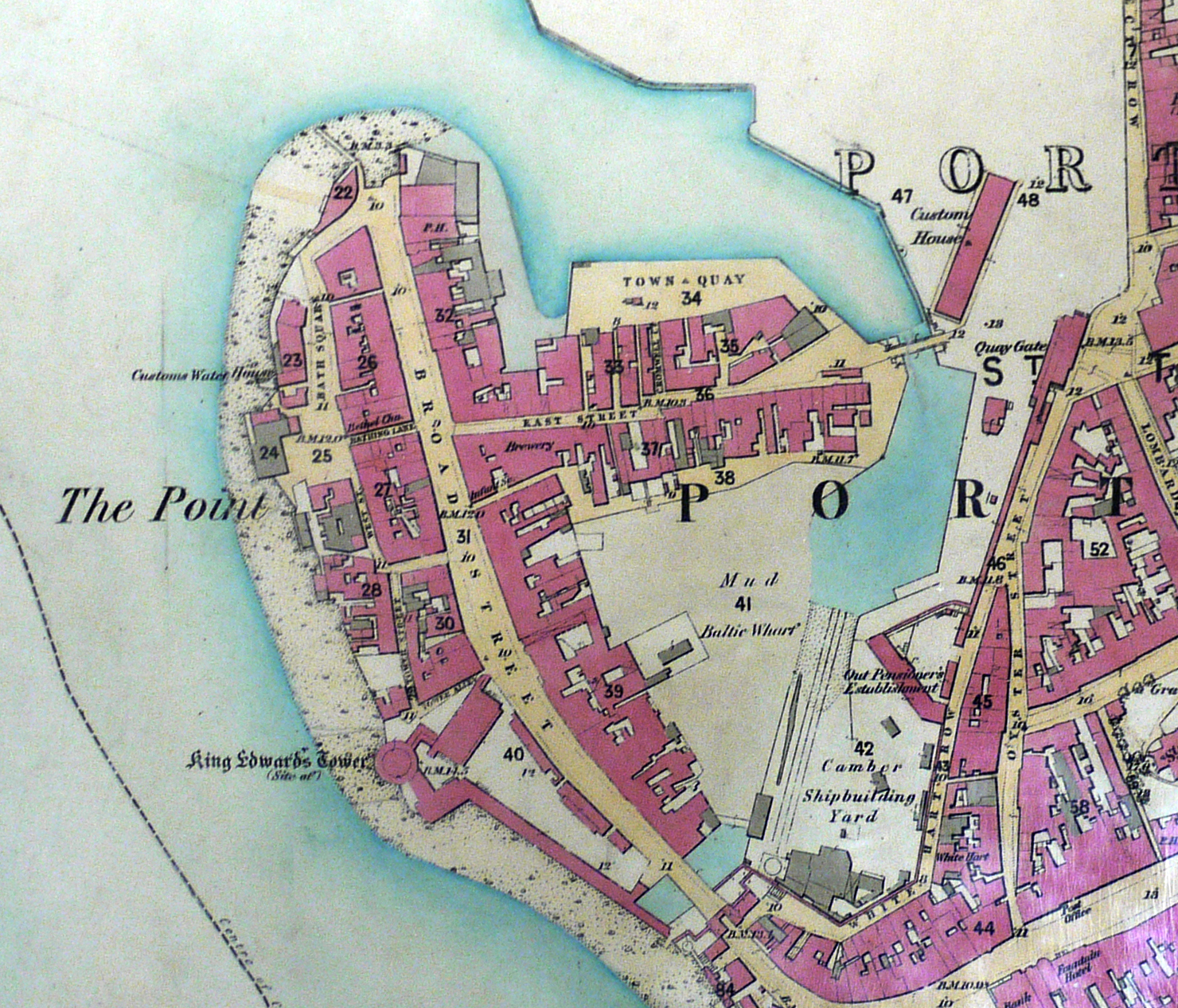
A map of the point in the second half of the 19th century

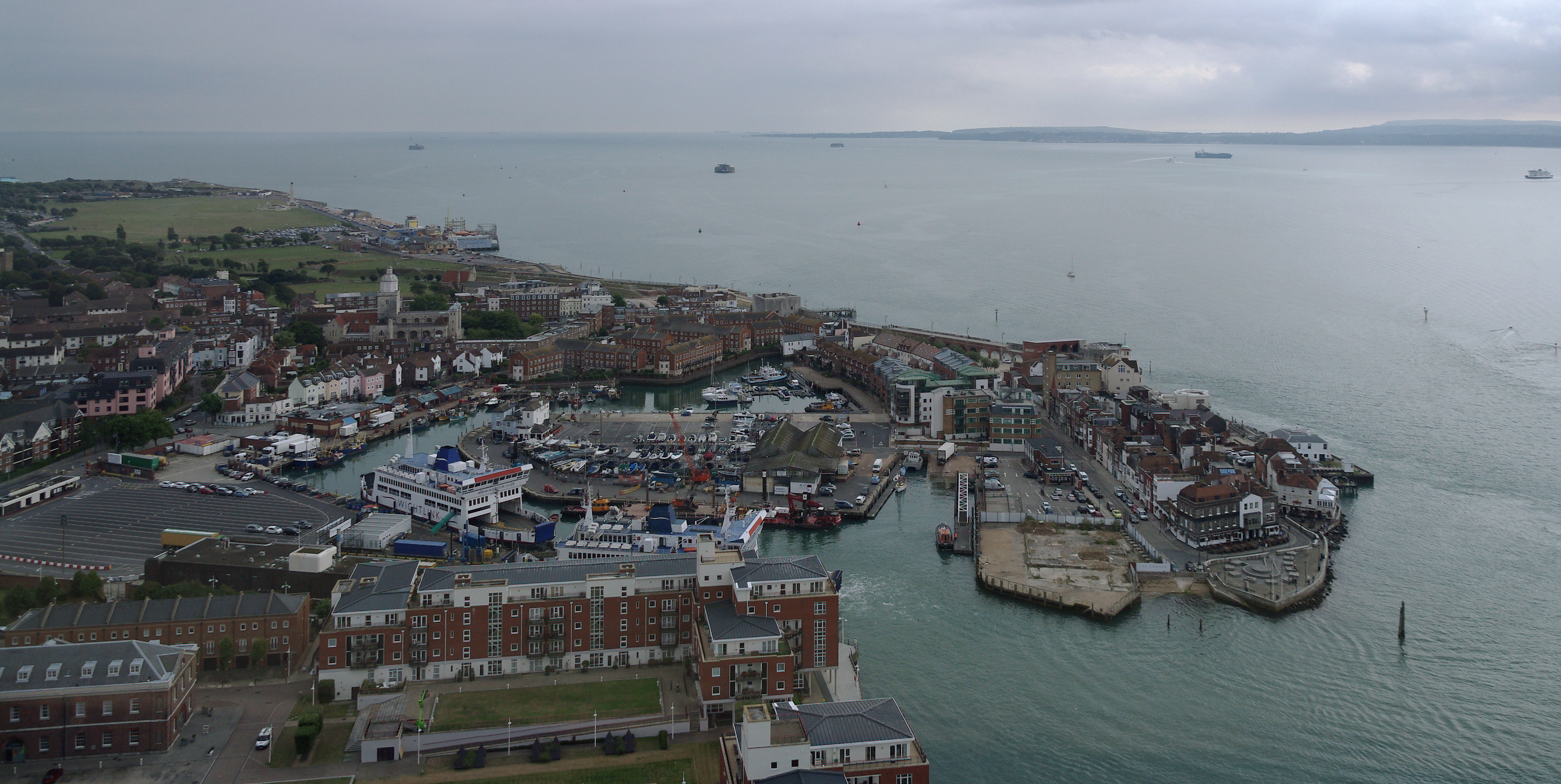
A contemporary view of Old Portsmouth (left) and The Point (right)
