= Portsmouth Naval Memorial =

War memorial in Portsmouth, Hampshire, England

- Commonwealth War Graves Commission
- Portsmouth Naval Memorial
- For Members of the Royal Navy who died during the First and Second World War and have no known grave
- Unveiled: 15 October 1924
- Location: 50.7824°N 1.0958°W
- Designed by: Robert Lorimer
- Commemorated: 24,654
- Website: https://www.cwgc.org/visit-us/find-cemeteries-memorials/cemetery-details/144703/portsmouth-naval-memorial/

Burials by war
- World War I, World War II
- Portsmouth

The Portsmouth Naval Memorial, sometimes known as Southsea Naval Memorial, is a war memorial in Portsmouth, Hampshire, England, on Southsea Common beside Clarence Esplanade, between Clarence Pier and Southsea Castle. The memorial commemorates approximately 25,000 British and Commonwealth sailors who were lost in the World Wars, around 10,000 sailors in the First World War, and 15,000 in the Second World War. The memorial features a central obelisk, with names of the dead on bronze plaques arranged around the memorial according to the year of death.

To commemorate sailors who had died at sea in the First World War and had no known grave, an Admiralty committee recommended building memorials at the three main naval ports in Great Britain: Chatham, Plymouth, and Portsmouth. Identical memorials at all three sites were designed by Sir Robert Lorimer, with sculpture by Henry Poole.

A separate memorial in Lowestoft commemorates the lost from the Royal Naval Patrol Service; the Fleet Air Arm is commemorated in Lee-on-the-Solent; and merchant seamen are commemorated at the Liverpool Naval Memorial and the Tower Hill Memorial in London. The Royal Naval Division War Memorial is on Horseguards Parade in London.

The memorial is made of Portland stone, with a prominent central obelisk topped by a metal finial. Steps lead up to a plinth bearing bronze inscription plaques fixed to the obelisk's base bearing the names of the lost. Each corner projects as a buttress, surmounted by a statue of a reclining lion, beneath a stepped base to the obelisk. The four-sided obelisk tapers slightly to a stepped top with an elaborate finial with corner ships prows and bronze supports to a verdigris copper ball. The memorial was unveiled on 15 October 1924 by Prince Albert, Duke of York (later King George VI).

The memorial was extended after the Second World War, to a design by Sir Edward Maufe. Names of those lost in the Second World War are recorded on panels set into the low walls of an enclosure added to the north, leading to a barrel-vaulted pavilion on each side. The additional sculpture was created by Charles Wheeler, William McMillan, and Esmond Burton. The additions were unveiled by Queen Elizabeth the Queen Mother, on 29 April 1953.

The memorial is maintained by the Commonwealth War Graves Commission. It became a listed building in 1972 and was upgraded to Grade I in May 2016 for the centenary of the Battle of Jutland.

== See also ==
- Plymouth Naval Memorial
- Chatham Naval Memorial
- Portsmouth War Memorial, the city's war memorial, in Guildhall Square
- Grade I listed buildings in Hampshire
- Grade I listed war memorials in England
