= Medieval Merchant's House =

Restored 13th-century building in England

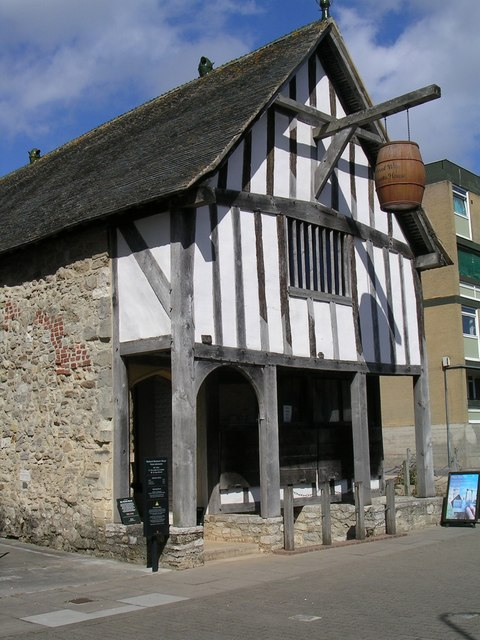

- Location within Southampton
- 50°53′55″N 1°24′19″W
- Type: Timber-framed
- Location: 58 French Street, Southampton
- OS grid reference: SU 41917 11180

History
- Built: 1290

Site notes
- Area: Hampshire
- Owner: English Heritage

Listed Building – Grade I
- Official name: Medieval Merchant's House
- Designated: 14 July 1953
- Reference no.: 1092048

Scheduled monument
- Official name: Medieval merchant's house and associated deposits at 58 French Street
- Designated: 16 May 1951
- Reference no.: 1014618

The Medieval Merchant's House is a restored late-13th-century building in Southampton, Hampshire, England. Built in about 1290 by John Fortin, a prosperous merchant, the house survived many centuries of domestic and commercial use largely intact. German bomb damage in 1940 revealed the medieval interior of the house, and in the 1980s it was restored to resemble its initial appearance and placed in the care of English Heritage, to be run as a tourist attraction. The house is built to a medieval right-angle, narrow plan design, with an undercroft to store wine at a constant temperature, and a first-storey bedchamber that projects out into the street to add additional space. The building is architecturally significant because, as historian Glyn Coppack highlights, it is "the only building of its type to survive substantially as first built"; it is a Grade I listed building and scheduled monument.

== History ==
=== 13th to 15th centuries ===
The Medieval Merchant's House was built in about 1290 on French Street, Southampton, then a major port and a large provincial town with a population of around 5,000, grown rich from the trade with England's continental possessions in Europe. The area of Southampton around French Street had been re-planned earlier in the century, reducing the numbers of farm animals kept in and around the houses, driving poorer merchants and craftsmen into the less desirable northern half of the city, and creating a quarter of large, impressive houses, often built in stone with tiled roofs. The original house was designed for use by John Fortin, a prosperous wine merchant, with a vaulted cellar for holding stock, a shop at the front of the property and accommodation for the family; much of it was built in stone, but it featured a timber front, a fashionable design for the period. At least 60 other houses similar to the Medieval Merchant's House were built in Southampton at around the same time.

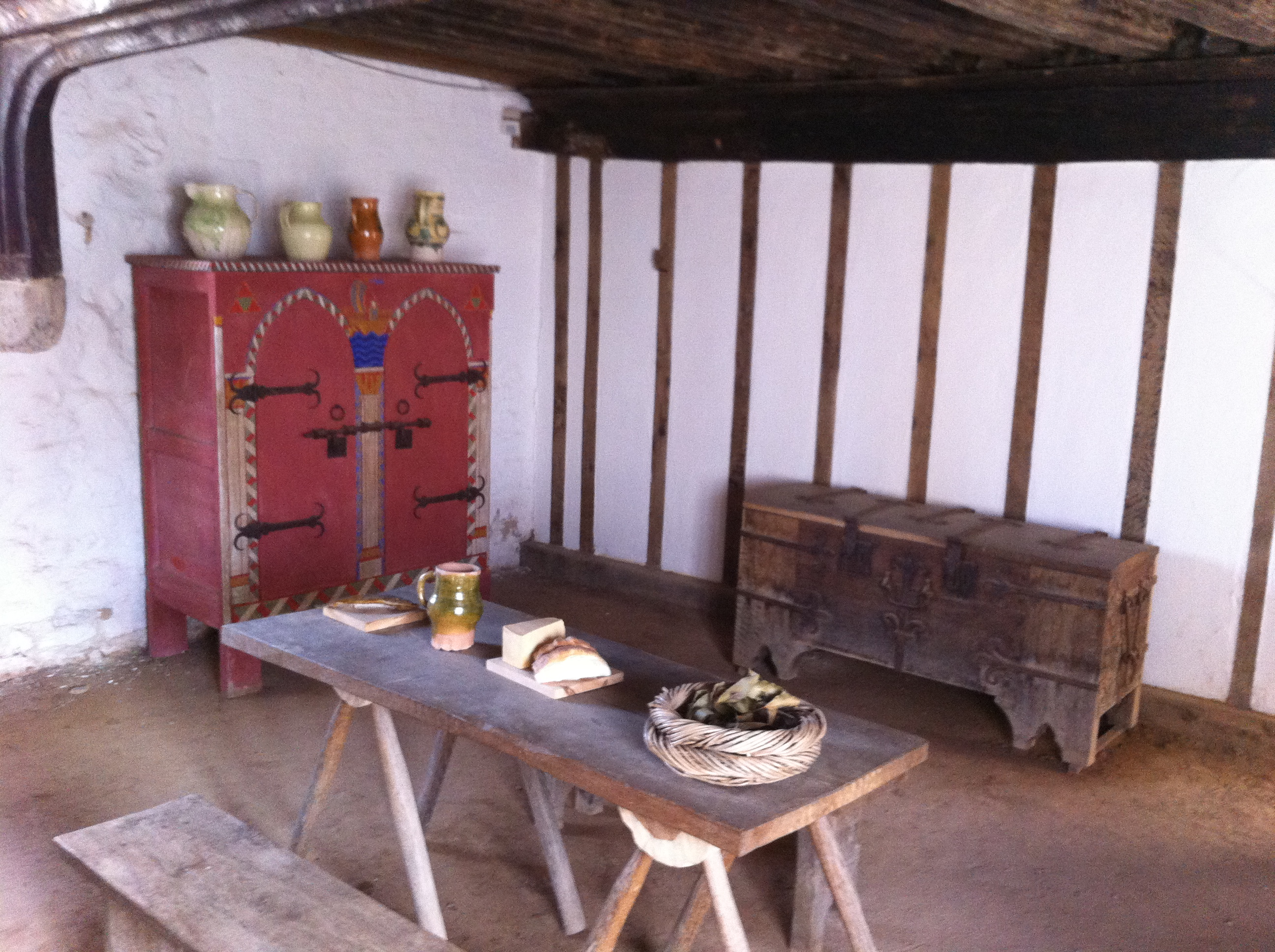
The central hall

By the 1330s, Southampton's prosperity was in a slow decline. In 1338 there was a successful French attack on the town, during which various buildings were burned and the castle was damaged. The house may have been one of those damaged in the raid, as the south-western corner of the building collapsed around that time and had to be quickly rebuilt; other alterations, including the addition of a fireplace, may have been carried out at the same time. Southampton's economy collapsed in the aftermath of the attacks. The character of French Street began to change, as many houses were sub-divided or redeveloped to fit in more buildings. The Medieval Merchant's House ceased to be used by major merchants and by 1392 appears to have been rented out to tenants by Thomas Fryke and John Barflet, the latter a descendant of John Fortin, for whom the house was originally built.

During the 15th century the economy of Southampton improved as a result of the Italian wool trade and the presence of many foreign merchants. The Medieval Merchant's House was acquired by a sequence of established Southampton merchants, but it remained intact as a detached dwelling, unlike many other properties in the neighbourhood that were combined to form the larger homes that became more fashionable in the late 15th century. In the middle of the 16th century, however, Southampton's economy collapsed once again as trade with Italy declined, taking with it the prosperity of French Street. A new parlour was installed in the house, and a floor was added halfway across the open hall to produce additional sleeping space.

=== 16th to 20th centuries ===
The house was transformed into three cottages during the 17th century, which involved a new door and additional fireplaces being added. The economy and status of Southampton did not begin to improve until the 18th century, when it became a noted cultural centre. In 1780 the three cottages were converted back into a single building, owned by a Mrs Collins as a lodging house for actors. During the Victorian era Southampton saw a huge expansion of its maritime docks and the construction of a new railway line. The Medieval Merchant's House was converted again, and had become a beer-shop by 1883, and a popular public house called the Bull's Head.

=== Late 20th and 21st centuries ===
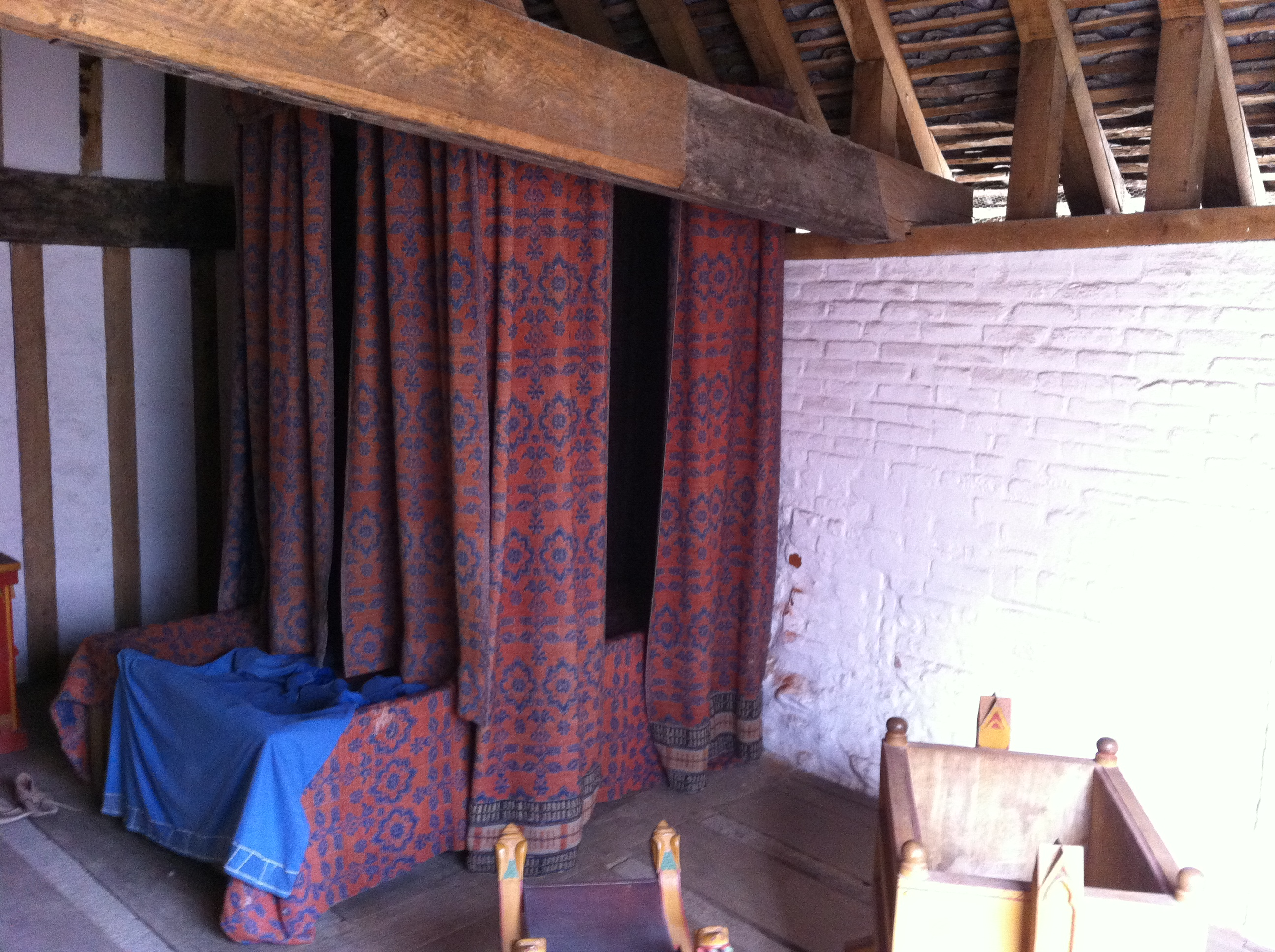
The east bedchamber

When the Second World War broke out in 1939 the house was being used as a brothel. In 1940 Southampton was heavily targeted during the Blitz. German bombs seriously damaged the house, revealing its medieval interior, and as a result Southampton City Council bought the property. In 1972 it was passed to the Secretary of State for the Environment, before being placed into the care of English Heritage in 1984.

The decision was taken to restore the Medieval Merchant's House as a tourist attraction, and the necessary work was carried out between 1983 and 1985. Academic Raphael Samuel has noted that the restoration was heavily influenced by the late-20th-century tradition of living history, in which "reinterpretation" gives way to "retrofitting". The process was also constrained by the damage that had occurred to the post-medieval parts of the building during the late 19th and early 20th centuries. Following archaeological investigations, the house was restored as closely as possible to its medieval condition, removing later material. Where the original medieval parts of the house had been lost, the work was based on archaeological reinterpretation. The finished house was fitted with replica late-13th-century and 14th-century furniture, and the uniform for the English Heritage staff running the house was originally medieval in design.

The Medieval Merchant's House on 58 French Street remains a tourist attraction and is a Grade I listed building and scheduled monument.

== Architecture ==
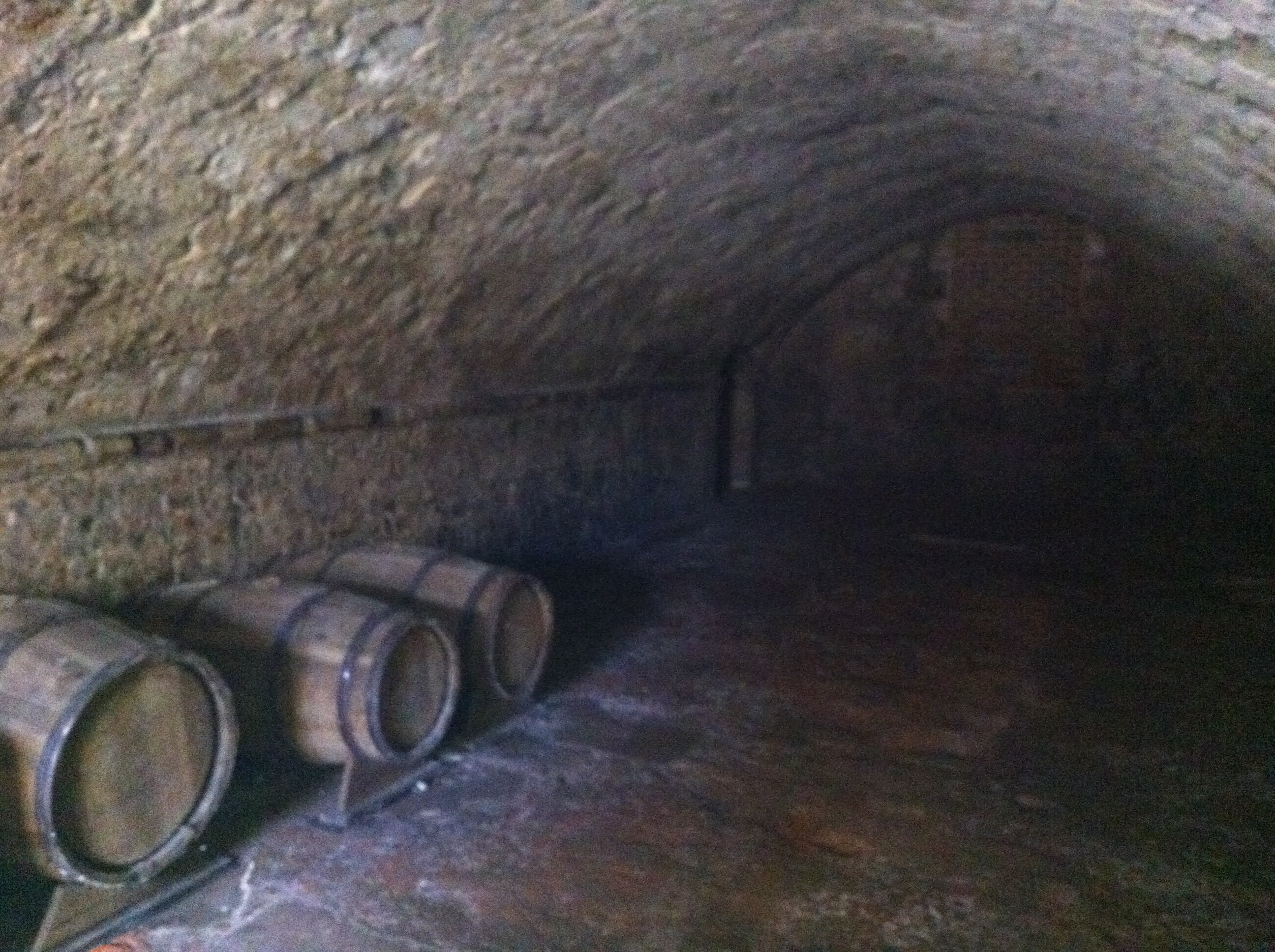
The undercroft, designed to store wine

The Medieval Merchant's House today faces onto French Street and combines walls built of Bembridge and Purbeck stone with a timber frontage. The layout of the house follows a medieval right-angle, narrow plan design, in that the hall stretches away from the street to conserve frontage, and there is no internal courtyard built into the design. Architecturally the house is important because, as historian Glyn Coppack highlights, it is "the only building of its type to survive substantially as first built".

At the front of the house, on the ground floor, is a reconstructed medieval shop front, from where the owner would have conducted his mercantile business. Behind this is the central hall, originally designed with an open hearth in the middle, but now fitted with a 14th-century Flemish chimney, plastered so as to resemble brickwork. A hallway runs along one side of the hall; hallways were a traditional feature of the period, although the fashion was eventually abandoned because of the difficulty of lighting them effectively. At the rear of the property is an inner private room, with a decorative ceiling. Beneath the house is an undercroft, or cellar, designed to store barrels of wine at a constant temperature; the brick floor is 18th-century in origin, however. This is an architectural feature found in several other English coastal and river medieval towns, including Winchester and London.

On the first floor the house is split into east and west bedchambers, linked across the central hall by a gallery. The east bedchamber is at the front of the house, and projects out into the street—this was a feature used to add space to houses, and is also seen in properties in Shrewsbury, Tewkesbury and York. Some of the makers' marks of the original builders can still be seen on the timbers in the room. The west bedchamber more closely resembles its 19th-century appearance rather than the medieval, as the Victorian-era ceiling has been left in place. The roof of the house is an identical replacement for the medieval original, tiled with Cornish slate.

== See also ==
- Economy of England in the Middle Ages
- Barley Hall, a similar medieval building subject to interpretative restoration
- King John's Palace, a Norman merchant's house also in Southampton

== Bibliography ==
- Coppack, Glyn. (2003) Medieval Merchant's House, Southampton. London: English Heritage. ISBN 1-85074-354-1.
- Dyer, Christopher. (2009) Making a Living in the Middle Ages: The People of Britain, 850 – 1520. London: Yale University Press. ISBN 978-0-300-10191-1.
- Emery, Anthony. (2007) Discovering Medieval Houses. Risborough: Shire Publications. ISBN 978-0-7478-0655-4.
- Ottaway, Patrick. (1992) Archaeology in British towns: from the Emperor Claudius to the Black Death. London: Routledge. ISBN 978-0-415-00068-0.
- Pantin, W. A. (1963), "Medieval English Town-House Plans" (PDF), Medieval Archaeology, 6–7: 202–239, doi:10.1080/00766097.1962.11735667
- Platt, Colin. (1994) Medieval England: A Social History and Archaeology from the Conquest to 1600 AD. London: Routledge. ISBN 978-0-415-12913-8.
- Samuel, Raphael. (1996) Theatres of Memory. London: Verso. ISBN 978-1-85984-077-1.
