= Landport =

Settlement area on Portsea Island, England

Coordinates: 50.803°N 1.087°W

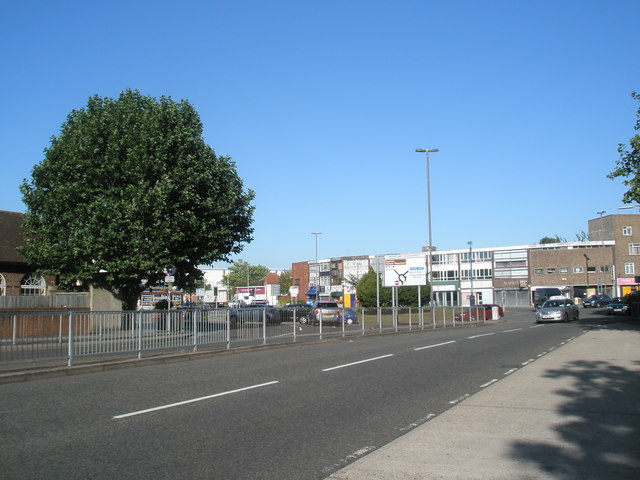
- Commercial Road, Landport
- North East
- Unitary authority: Portsmouth
- Shire county: Hampshire
- Country: England
- Sovereign state: United Kingdom
- Post town: Portsmouth

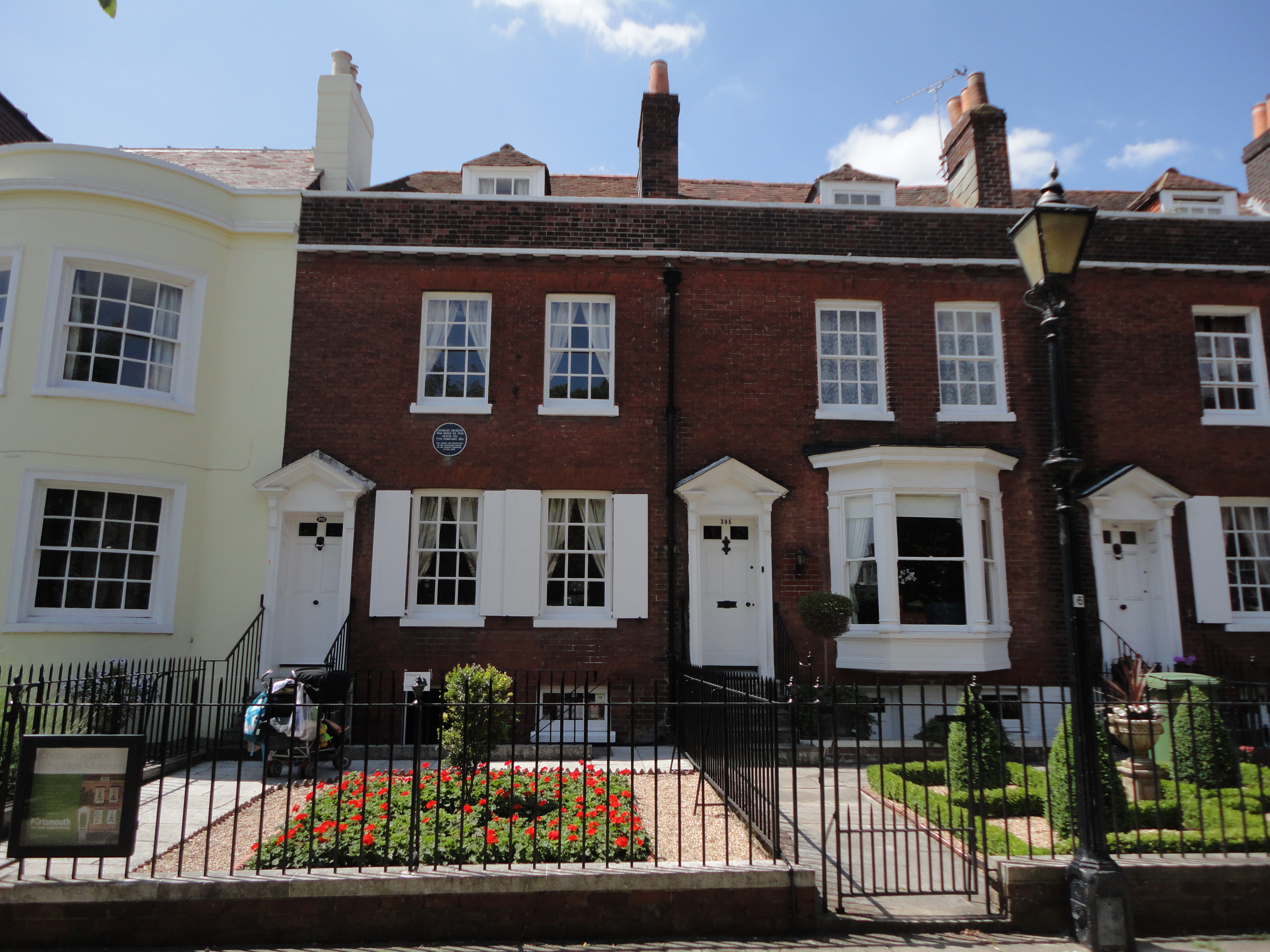
Charles Dickens's birthplace, 393 Commercial Road, Landport

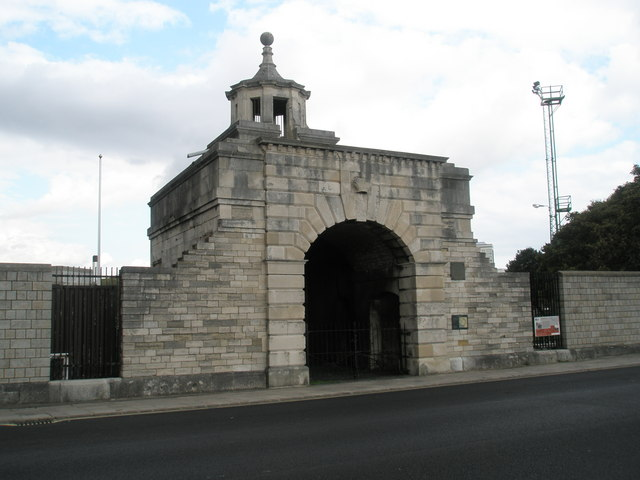
Landport Gate, from whence the settlement derived its name

Landport is a district located on Portsea Island and is considered the city centre of modern-day Portsmouth, England. The district is centred around Commercial Road and encompasses the Guildhall, Civic Centre, Portsmouth and Southsea Station and the Commercial Road central shopping area. The original historic old town of Portsmouth lies to the south of Landport and is now known as Old Portsmouth. The district of Portsea lies to the West; Somers Town and Southsea are to the south; Fratton lies to the East and the Kingston Crescent area to the north.

== Toponymy ==
The area derives its name from Landport Gate. The Landport Gate held its name as early as 1727, however the settlement, while formed earlier and at least partially known as "Halfway-Houses", (Note: Halfway between (Old) Portsmouth and Kingston Village (Kingston Crescent area on Portsea)) took the designation of Landport (Town) from 1831.

== History ==
Halfway Houses took its name from the Halfway House, an inn on the road to London from Old Portsmouth. By 1716 a number of other buildings had appeared, including Ridge's Brewhouse, a sizeable complex which stood on the corner where the main road was met by the road from the Common. By 1792, barracks for the Royal Military Artificers had replaced the brewhouse (their successors, the Royal Sappers and Miners, remained there until 1834, when it was decided to put all garrison engineering works out to contract; whereupon the Portsmouth contingent was disbanded and the barracks sold).

Landport as a residential settlement began in the late eighteenth century as an overspill from the confines of the Old Portsmouth defensive fortifications and commenced with a series of homes on the road from Landport Gate to the village of Kingston. Overspill developed outwards from this road, which was to become known as Commercial Road, itself forming part of what was later to be designated the A3 road to London. (Note: The current Commercial Road is only part of the earlier Commercial Road)

== Governance ==
The district is administered by the unitary authority Portsmouth City Council. It lies predominately within Charles Dickens Ward which also encompasses Portsea district and a portion of Fratton. The Parliament constituency is Portsmouth South.

== Geography ==
The district contains the main shopping area for Portsmouth. Before World War II the district was also a residential area, mainly catering for employees of the naval dockyard and their families. The district was heavily damaged by bombing during the war. After the war the decision was made that most of the remaining houses were substandard and the area was largely cleared. Some of the cleared area was used for the controversial Tricorn Centre.

== Mile End ==
Mile End began as a small 18th century settlement built on the London to Portsmouth A3 road, a mile to the north of the main Landport Gate entrance to the original walled town of Portsmouth (now Old Portsmouth). Mile End was consumed within the rapid urban development of the Landport and Buckland areas during the 19th and 20th centuries. Much like neighbouring Rudmore, Mile End's proximity to Portsmouth's naval dockyard during World War II caused extensive damage and redevelopment of the Mile End area post-war.

However, remnants of Mile End still survive to the present day along the western edge of Portsea Island. Mile End Road is the official name of a section of the A3 road to the north of Commercial Road which extends northwards through Mile End (alongside the M275 motorway) towards the Rudmore Roundabout intersection with Kingston Crescent in North End. To the west of Mile End Road is the Mile End Industrial Estate.

Novelist Charles Dickens was born at 1 Mile End Terrace, Mile End on 7 February 1812, which has since been renamed as 393 Old Commercial Road, Landport.

== George Lewin Oliver ==
Mile End House School, was a boys preparatory school located in Mile End Terrace, the same street novelist Charles Dickens was born in. Mile End House School was also known informally as 'Oliver's Academy', as the school's founder and head teacher was a Mr George Lewin Oliver. The school building still exists, in what is now known as Old Commercial Road, in Landport, Portsmouth. George Oliver was also one of the original founding directors of Portsmouth Football Club, who were founded on 5 April 1898. George Oliver became the chairman of a reformed Portsmouth Football Club on 27 July 1912, after the original 1898 parent company was dissolved to clear debts and replaced with a newer parent company. George Lewin Oliver died on 23 December 1934 and received an obituary in The London Gazette on 24 May 1935.

== Landmarks ==
The English novelist Charles Dickens was born on 7 February 1812 at 1 Mile End Terrace, Mile End, Landport, where his parents lived after moving from Portsmouth in 1809. His former home has since been renamed 393 Old Commercial Road and is now the Charles Dickens' Birthplace Museum in Landport, Portsmouth.

The Landport area is home to St Agatha's church which was originally constructed under the then mission incumbent Robert William Radclyffe Dolling. It is also home to St Faith built between 1956 and 1957 to a design by Thomas Ford.

== Education ==
Some parts of the campus of Portsmouth University including lecture rooms and halls of residence are spread across the south-west part of the district. The Portsmouth campus of Highbury college also lies within the district. The secondary schools in the district are St Edmund's Catholic School and Ark Charter Academy, north and south of the railway respectively.
