= St John the Baptist Church, Winchester =

Church in Hampshire, England

Coordinates: 51.062285°N 1.306399°W

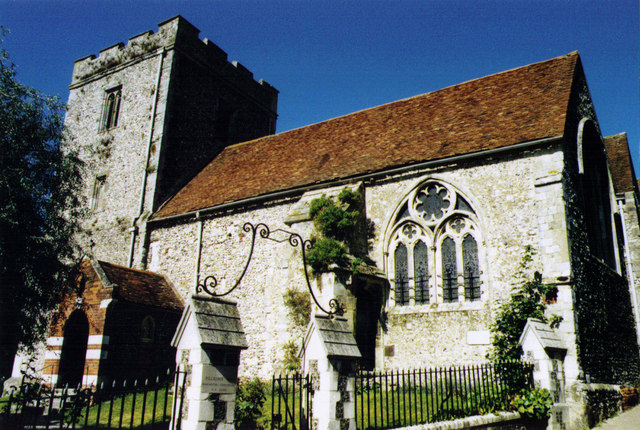
- More images
- OS grid reference: SU 48701 29446
- Country: England
- Denomination: Church of England
- Website: www.eastwinchester.org

Architecture
- Style: Originally Norman with later changes"
- Years built: before 1142

Administration
- Diocese: Winchester
- Deanery: Winchester

Clergy
- Rector: Paul Kennedy

St John the Baptist Church, Winchester is a Grade I Church of England parish church in Winchester, England.

The parish is officially named "St John the Baptist with St Martin Winnall, Winchester" although the church of St Martin at Winnall was demolished in 1971. The parish is joined with the parish of "All Saints with St Andrew Chilcomb" to form the East Winchester Benefice.
