= St James Church, Southwick =

St James, Southwick
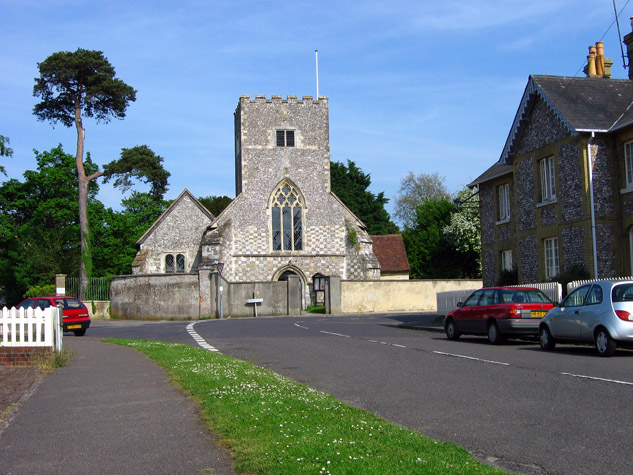
- St James, Southwick
- 50°52′26″N 1°06′42″W
- OS grid reference: SU 62594 08644
- Location: Southwick
- Country: England
- Denomination: Church of England

History
- Dedication: St James

Architecture
- Heritage designation: Grade I

Administration
- Diocese: Portsmouth

St James Church, Southwick is the Church of England parish church of Southwick, Hampshire, England. The parish is part of the Diocese of Portsmouth.

The church is designated a Grade I listed building by Historic England.

The church has a Perpendicular tower and chancel. The west window is 14th century. Inside there is a 17th-century gallery supported by twisted wooden columns. The box pews, altar rail and pulpit also date from the 17th century.
