= Berrydown Court =

Country house in Hampshire, England, by Edwin Lutyens

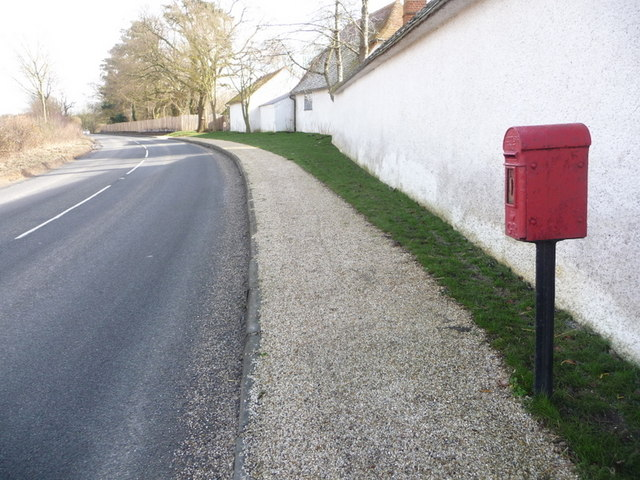
- The Grade I-listed boundary wall to Berrydown Court. The house itself is not visible from the public highway
- Interactive map of Berrydown Court
- 51.2421°N 1.2478°W
- Location: between Ashe and Overton, Hampshire

History
- Built: 1897-8

Site notes
- Area: Southern England
- Architect: Edwin Lutyens
- Architectural style: Surrey vernacular
- Governing body: Private

Listed Building – Grade I
- Official name: Berrydown Court House
- Designated: 10 January 1977
- Reference no.: 1302517

Listed Building – Grade I
- Official name: Entrance Lodge to Berrydown Court
- Designated: 10 January 1977
- Reference no.: 1302479

Listed Building – Grade I
- Official name: Walls to kitchen garden, forecourt, and roadside boundary, with garden store buildings, Berrydown Court
- Designated: 12 April 1984
- Reference no.: 1092705

Berrydown Court is a late 19th-century country house, on the B3400 road between the villages of Ashe and Overton in Hampshire, England. The house was built in 1897-1898 and was designed by Edwin Lutyens. Berrydown is a Grade I listed building, and its entrance lodge and boundary walls are also listed at Grade I.

== History ==
Berrydown Court was built for Archibald Grove (1855-1920), founder-editor of the New Review magazine, and member of parliament for West Ham North (1892-95) and South Northamptonshire (1906-10). (Note: Archibald Grove, in addition to his journalistic and political careers, engaged in financial and property speculation, as well as social climbing. Christopher Hussey wrote of his "mysterious fluctuations of fortune".) Grove was a personal friend of Edwin Lutyens and began discussions regarding the construction of a house in Hampshire in around 1890, when Grove had bought land in the Overton area and was attempting to find a parliamentary seat in the county. Disagreements between client and architect delayed the commencement of building until 1897, but the house was complete by 1898. (Note: Although relations between Grove and Lutyens remained sufficiently cordial for Lutyens and his wife to be frequent houseguests at Berrydown, he declined to be involved in any of Grove's subsequent building projects. It is suggested, although disputed, that Lutyens may have undertaken designs for Pollards Park House, a later home Grove planned in Chalfont St Giles, Buckinghamshire. In any event, the house was not completed during Grove's ownership as he went bankrupt during its construction. Historic England attribute both the house, and its entrance lodge, to Lutyens. Clayre Percy and Jane Ridley, in their edition of Lutyens' letters to Lady Emily, suggest that designs were drawn up by Lutyens, but that Grove did not proceed with them, owing to his dissatisfaction with Berrydown.) (Note: Lutyens' wife, Lady Emily, found Grove's wife, Kate, a figure of some amusement. Her habits of scenting the house with "foul-smelling carbolic" acid, and wearing dresses without stays despite her full figure, were the subject of comment in the Lutyens' extensive correspondence.) The construction saw further friction between Grove and Lutyens, particularly in relation to the garden, which the latter had planned in conjunction with Gertrude Jekyll. Jane Brown, in her study of the Lutyens/Jekyll partnership, Gardens of a Golden Afternoon, suggests that the couple failed fully to appreciate the challenges of the site, without a view and immediately adjacent to a road, and also misunderstood the underlying soil, such that, in 1899, William Robinson, a friend of both, was called in to suggest solutions. Grove sold the estate in 1904 to Edward Cooper, an underwriter and partner in Hartley, Cooper and Co. The estate was resold on a number of occasions in the 20th and 21st centuries, until bought by the present owners in 2001. (Note: In 2001, Berrydown's agricultural estate was sold off to Jody Scheckter, the Formula One racing driver, who incorporated it into his Laverstoke Park Farm estate.) During their tenure, a major restoration of the house and gardens has been undertaken. Berrydown remains a private house and is not open to the public.

== Architecture and description ==
Berrydown is of two-storeys with an attic floor. It is shielded from the road by a long boundary wall, which also forms the northern wall of the kitchen garden and is pierced by a gate lodge. Colin Amery, Margaret Richardson and Gavin Stamp, in the catalogue published to accompany the 1981 Hayward Gallery exhibition, Lutyens - The work of the English architect Sir Edwin Lutyens (1869-1944), describe the entrance front as "Tudor" in style. (Note: The 1981 exhibition, sponsored by the Arts Council of Great Britain and held at the Hayward Gallery, did much to restore Lutyens's diminished, post-war, reputation.) The garden front, which Roderick Gradidge considered "surprisingly complex", has massive gables, is tile-hung and the roof carries three large chimney stacks. The interior plan is simple, has seen little change since its construction, and was subject to a full restoration, supported by the Lutyens Trust, in the early 21st century. During the restoration wall murals by Lutyens, depicting birds and figures and including one considered to be a depiction of his daughter Barbara, were uncovered.

Michael Bullen, James Crook and Rodney Hubbuck, in their Hampshire: Winchester and the North volume in the Pevsner Buildings of England series, revised and published in 2010, note that Berrydown is among the least studied of all of Lutyens' larger houses. Lawrence Weaver, in his monumental study, Lutyens Houses and Gardens, published in 1921 did not mention the house at all. It is also one of the less appreciated of his early designs; Christopher Hussey, in his biography of Lutyens, described it as "undistinguished", although he was more complimentary of the stables, gatehouse lodge and boundary wall, which he thought reminiscent of Randolph Caldecott's paintings of Surrey farms. In the later 20th, and 21st centuries, the house has been the subject of some reappraisal. Gradidge described the road frontage as "bland", but considered the garden front of much greater interest, with early evidence of Arts and Crafts and Art Deco inspirations. Bullen, Crook and Hubbuck consider the house an "extraordinary composition".

Berrydown is a Grade I listed building, and its entrance lodge and boundary walls are also listed at Grade I.

== Sources ==
- Amery, Colin; Richardson, Margaret; Stamp, Gavin (1981). Lutyens: The work of the English architect Sir Edwin Lutyens (1869-1944). London: Arts Council of Great Britain. ISBN 978-0-728-70303-2. OCLC 9197844.
- Brown, Jane (1982). Gardens of a Golden Afternoon: The Story of a Partnership, Edwin Lutyens and Gertrude Jekyll. London: Penguin Books. ISBN 978-0-713-91440-5. OCLC 9097325.
- — (1997). Lutyens and the Edwardians: An English Architect and his Clients. London: Penguin Books. ISBN 978-0-140-24269-0. OCLC 41329268.
- Bullen, Michael; Crook, John; Hubbuck, Rodney; Pevsner, Nikolaus (2019). Hampshire: Winchester and the North. Pevsner Buildings of England. New Haven, US and London: Yale University Press. ISBN 978-0-300-12084-4. OCLC 1166584857.
- Dodd, P. J. (2014). The Life of Archibald Grove (1854-1920) (PDF). Chalfont St Giles, Buckinghamshire: Chalfont St Giles Local History Society.
- Gradidge, Roderick (1981). Edwin Lutyens: Architect Laureate. London: George Allen & Unwin. ISBN 978-0-047-20023-6. OCLC 473661375.
- Hussey, Christopher (1984). The life of Sir Edwin Lutyens. Woodbridge, Suffolk: Antique Collectors' Club. ISBN 978-0-907-46259-0. OCLC 29913780.
- Lutyens, Edwin (1985). Clayre Percy; Jane Brown (eds.). The Letters of Edwin Lutyens: To his wife, Lady Emily. London: Collins. ISBN 978-0-002-17063-5. OCLC 13185347.
- Ridley, Jane (2002). The architect and his wife: A life of Edwin Lutyens. London: Chatto & Windus. ISBN 978-0-701-17201-5. OCLC 50159517.
- Weaver, Lawrence (1921). Lutyens Houses and Gardens. London: Country Life. OCLC 1015756779.
