= Charles Dickens' Birthplace Museum =

Writer's house museum in Portsmouth, England

Coordinates: 50.807046°N 1.087238°W

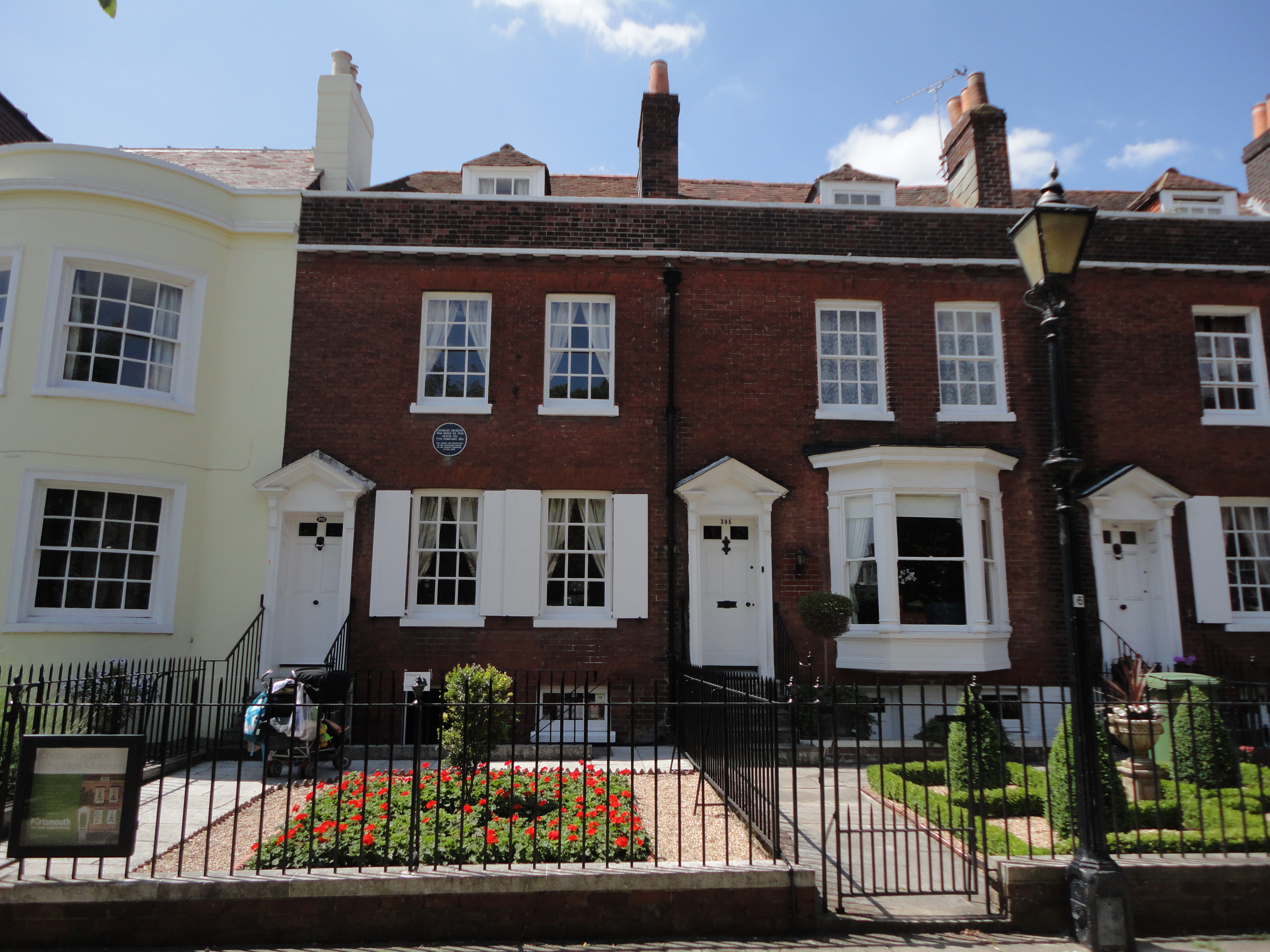
Charles Dickens' birthplace

Charles Dickens' Birthplace Museum is a writer's house museum in Landport, Portsmouth, England, situated at the birthplace of the eminent English author Charles Dickens; and as such played a prominent part in the 2012 bicentennial celebrations. It is one of six museums run by Portsmouth Museums, part of Portsmouth City Council.

The house has been owned by the town and then city of Portsmouth since 1904. Its interior underwent significant restoration in the 1960s.

== See also ==
- Dickens family
- Dickens World
- Charles Dickens Museum, London
- Tavistock House
