= St Mary's Church, Selborne =

Church of St Mary
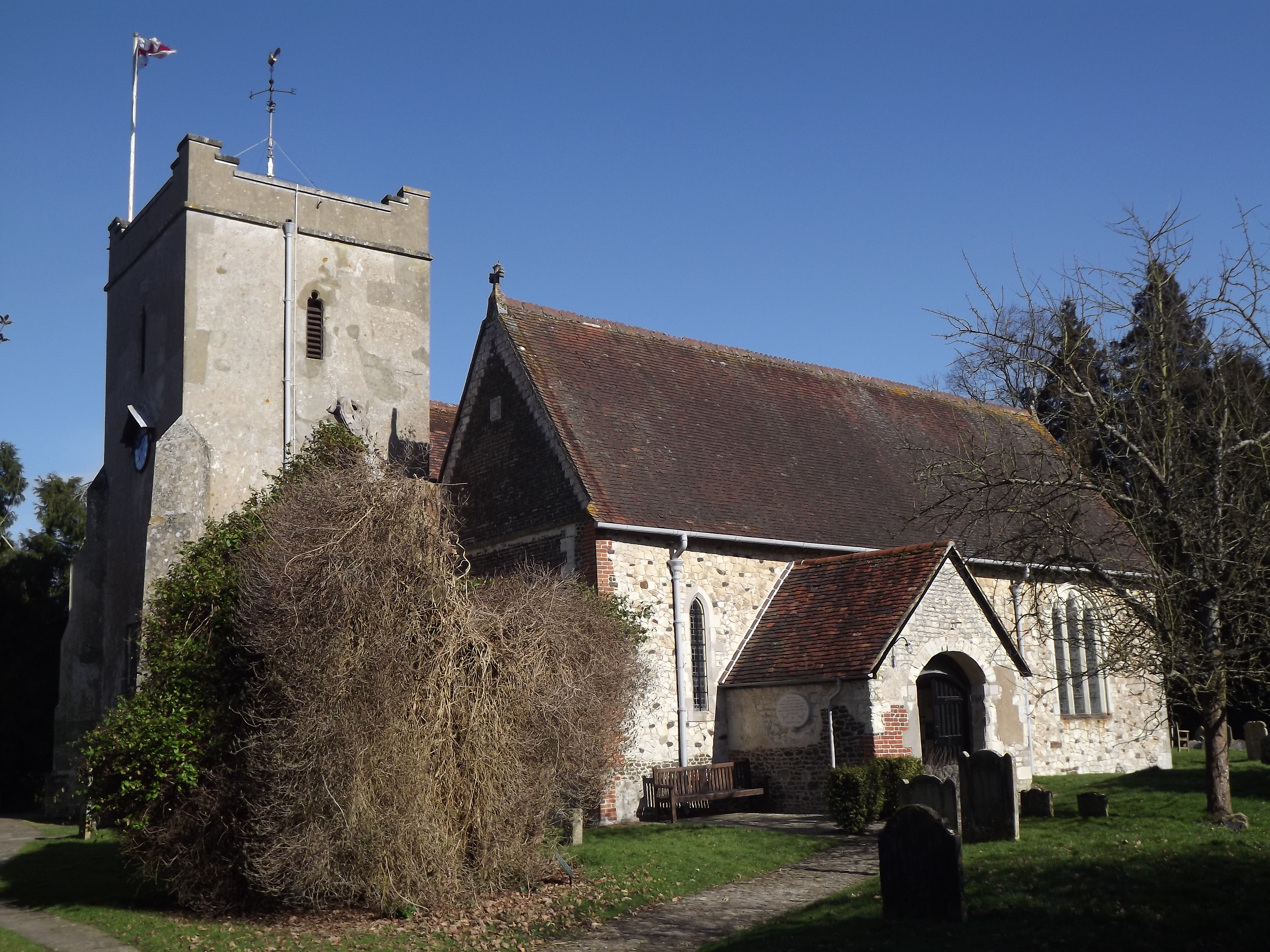
- Church of St Mary
- 51°5′54.600″N 0°56′34.321″W
- OS grid reference: SU 741 338
- Location: Selborne, Hampshire
- Country: England
- Denomination: Church of England
- Website: www.stmaryschurchselborne.co.uk

Architecture
- Heritage designation: Grade I
- Designated: 3 July 1963

Administration
- Diocese: Winchester

The Church of St Mary is an Anglican church in the village of Selborne, Hampshire, England. It is in the Diocese of Winchester. The building is Grade I listed; The church dates from about 1180, with modifications in the medieval period and restoration in the 19th century.

== History and description ==
The oldest part of the church, the four-bay arcades of the nave, dates from about 1180. The north aisle, later rebuilt, is thought to have its original width. The south aisle was widened about 1220, to a size similar to that of the nave, and it has a separate roof. A north transept was built about 1305. The tower has had many alterations made, and was repaired in 1781; its original date is not known.

=== 19th century ===
There was restoration of the chancel about 1840; of the nave and north transept in 1877; and the south aisle and tower were restored in 1883. More work was done to the chancel in 1889. The chancel arch, of 1856, by William White, is a copy of the nave arcades.

=== Interior ===
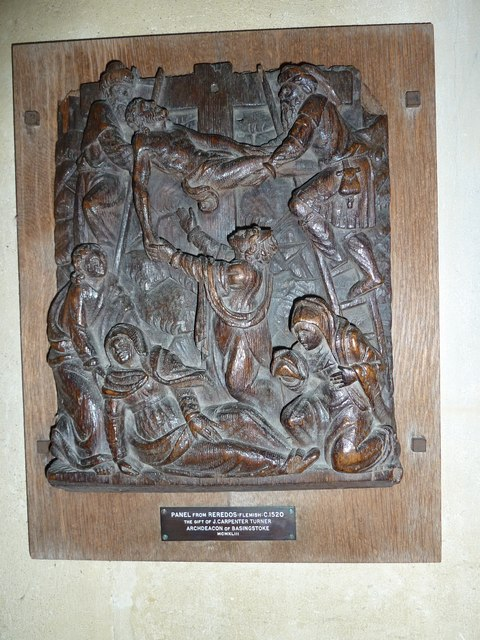
Flemish wood carving, c. 1520

The font, at the west end of the south aisle, dating from the 12th century, is plain and round; the cover is made of wood from the Selborne Yew. Over the altar there is a painting of the Adoration of the Magi by Jan Mostaert, of about 1510. It is a triptych, showing Saint Andrew on the north side and Saint George on the south. It was given to the church in 1793 by Benjamin White. Also in the church is a Flemish wood carving of about 1520, of the Descent from the Cross, originally a panel from a reredos. It was the gift of John Turner, Archdeacon of Basingstoke. In the south aisle is a stained glass three-light window fitted in 1920, a memorial to the naturalist Gilbert White, depicting St Francis and the Birds; the birds shown are all mentioned in White's The Natural History and Antiquities of Selborne. White was the curate of Selborne for many years, and is buried in the churchyard.

== The Selborne Yew ==
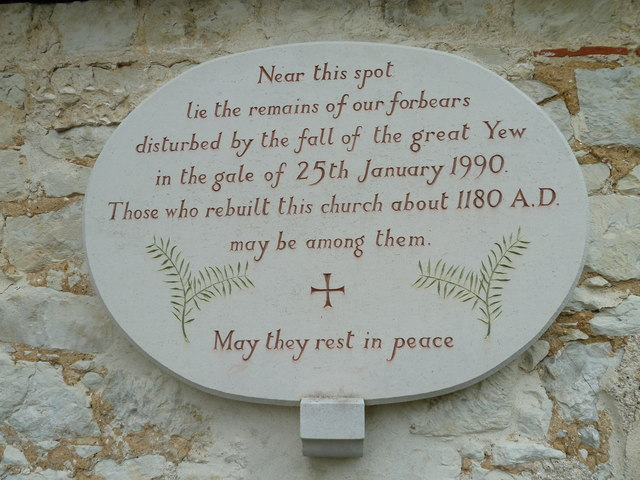
Plaque on the church porch

A yew tree stands on the left-hand side of the path leading to the south porch. It was planted about 600 A.D., and in Gilbert White's time its girth was 23 feet (7.0 m). In The Natural History and Antiquities of Selborne it is included among the village's antiquities. It was blown down in a storm on 25 January 1990; the trunk was replanted, but it was declared dead in 1991. A cutting from the tree is growing in the churchyard. The Selborne Yew was selected in 2002 by the Tree Council as one of the 50 Great British Trees marking the Golden Jubilee of Elizabeth II.

Beneath the tree is the grave, lacking a headstone, of the village trumpeter John Newland. He took part in the Swing Riots of 1830; the rioters were captured by soldiers, but Newland escaped. He was eventually pardoned, and he returned to Selborne.
