= Fort Southwick =

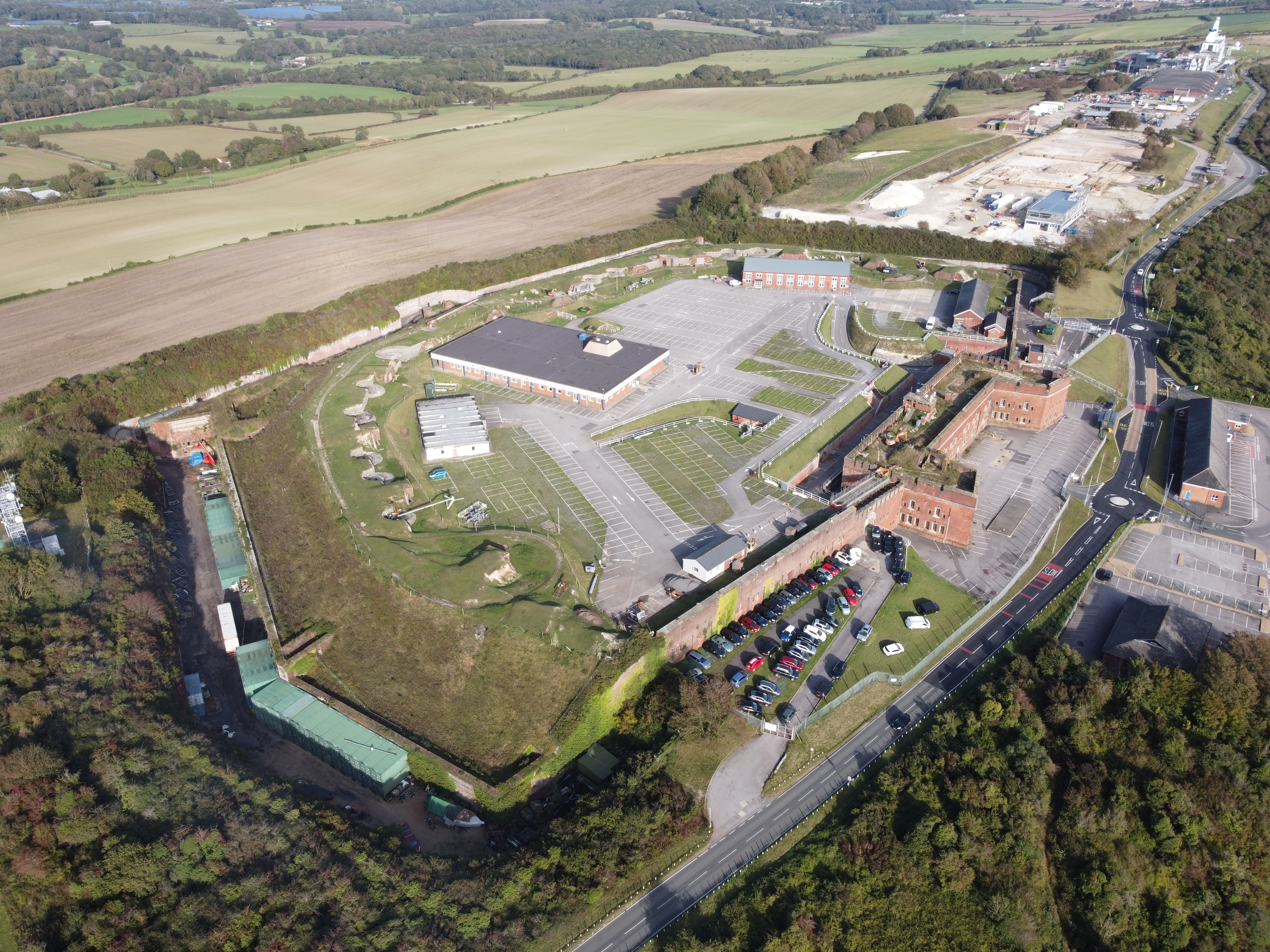
- Aerial view of the fort

Site information
- Open to the public: No
- Condition: Complete

Location
- Coordinates: 50°51′32″N 1°06′31″W

Site history
- Built: 1861-1870
- Materials: Earth; Brick

Fort Southwick is one of the forts found on Portsdown Hill, which overlooks the naval base of Portsmouth in the county of Hampshire, England.

== History ==
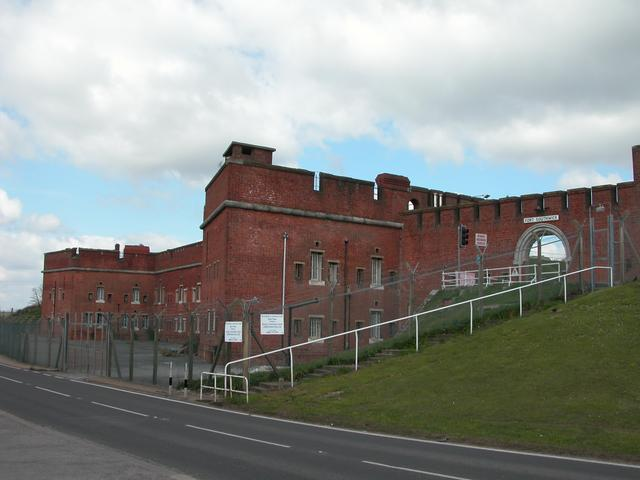
Main entrance at Fort Southwick

Fort Southwick was built to defend the landward approaches to the naval base on the recommendation of the Royal Commission on the Defence of the United Kingdom which reported in 1860.

It is the highest fort on the hill, and holds the water storage tanks for the other forts, supplying them via a brick lined aqueduct. Construction was started in 1861 and completed by 1870. It was designed to house a large complement of men (about 220) in a crescent-shaped barrack block. Its north projection has one full caponier to defend the dry ditch, and has two smaller demi-caponiers at the corners. A small musketry gallery crosses the ditch at the south-west angle to cover a minor branch of the ditch. Mortar batteries of five mortars each can be found set into the rampart behind the demi-caponiers.

In 1893 the fort was armed with a total of 23 guns:

- Nine 64 pounder rifled muzzle-loading guns
- Eight 7-inch rifled breech-loading (RBL) guns
- Six 8 in (20.3 cm) rifled muzzle loaded howitzers (three were on ground platforms; the other three on travelling carriages)

A central spiral staircase from the surface gives access to four main tunnels running radially outward from it at uneven angles. These tunnels lead to the barrack block and caponiers, and past the magazine.

Although disarmed in 1906, the fort was retained by the military as a barracks, and also used to train soldiers how to capture and hold a fort. It became a demobilisation centre for three years after the First World War.

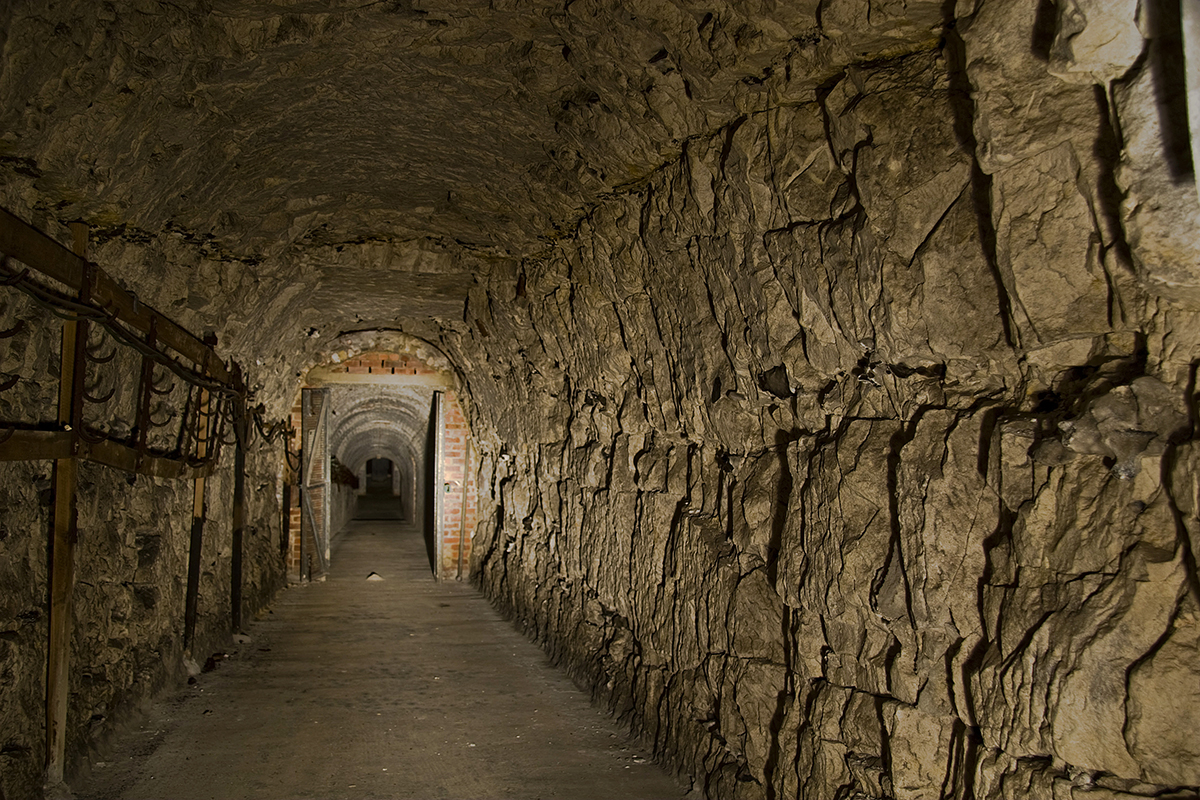
Part of the tunnel network under Fort Southwick

During the Second World War, a secret network of tunnels was excavated between February and December 1942 by 172 Tunnelling Company of the Royal Engineers 100 ft (30 m) underneath Fort Southwick to serve as the underground headquarters (UGHQ), the communications "nerve centre", for Operation Overlord. The call sign of this UGHQ was 'MIN'.

The fort was part of the Admiralty Research Establishment until 2002, when military control of the fort ceased. It was sold by the Ministry of Defence in July 2003 to the "Fort Southwick Company Limited", who intended to convert the barrack block into luxury apartments. The site is currently occupied by the NHS and includes a staff park and ride service to Queen Alexandra Hospital.

It has been a Grade I Listed Building since 1987.

== Bibliography ==
- Hogg, Ian V (1974). Coast Defences of England and Wales 1856-1956. David & Charles. ISBN 0-7153 6353-0.
