= King John's Palace, Southampton =

King John's Palace
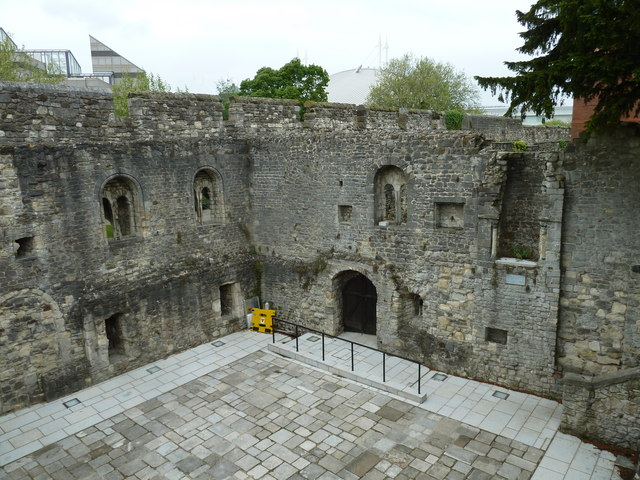

- Location within Southampton
- 50°53′58.2″N 1°24′24.5″W
- Type: Ruined Norman merchant's house
- Location: Blue Anchor Lane, Southampton City Centre
- OS grid reference: SU4182211285

History
- Built: 1170s–1180s

Site notes
- Elevation: 6 metres (20 ft)
- Height: 2 floors

Scheduled monument
- Reference no.: 1001887

Listed Building – Grade I
- Designated: 14 July 1953
- Reference no.: 1339942

King John's Palace is a ruined Norman merchant's house in Southampton, England, incorrectly believed for a period to have been used by King John, resulting in its modern name. The west wall of the house was converted to form part of the city's defensive walls in the early 14th century and its archways contain what may be Britain's earliest surviving gunports. The structure now forms part of the Tudor House Museum in the city and is a scheduled monument.

== History ==
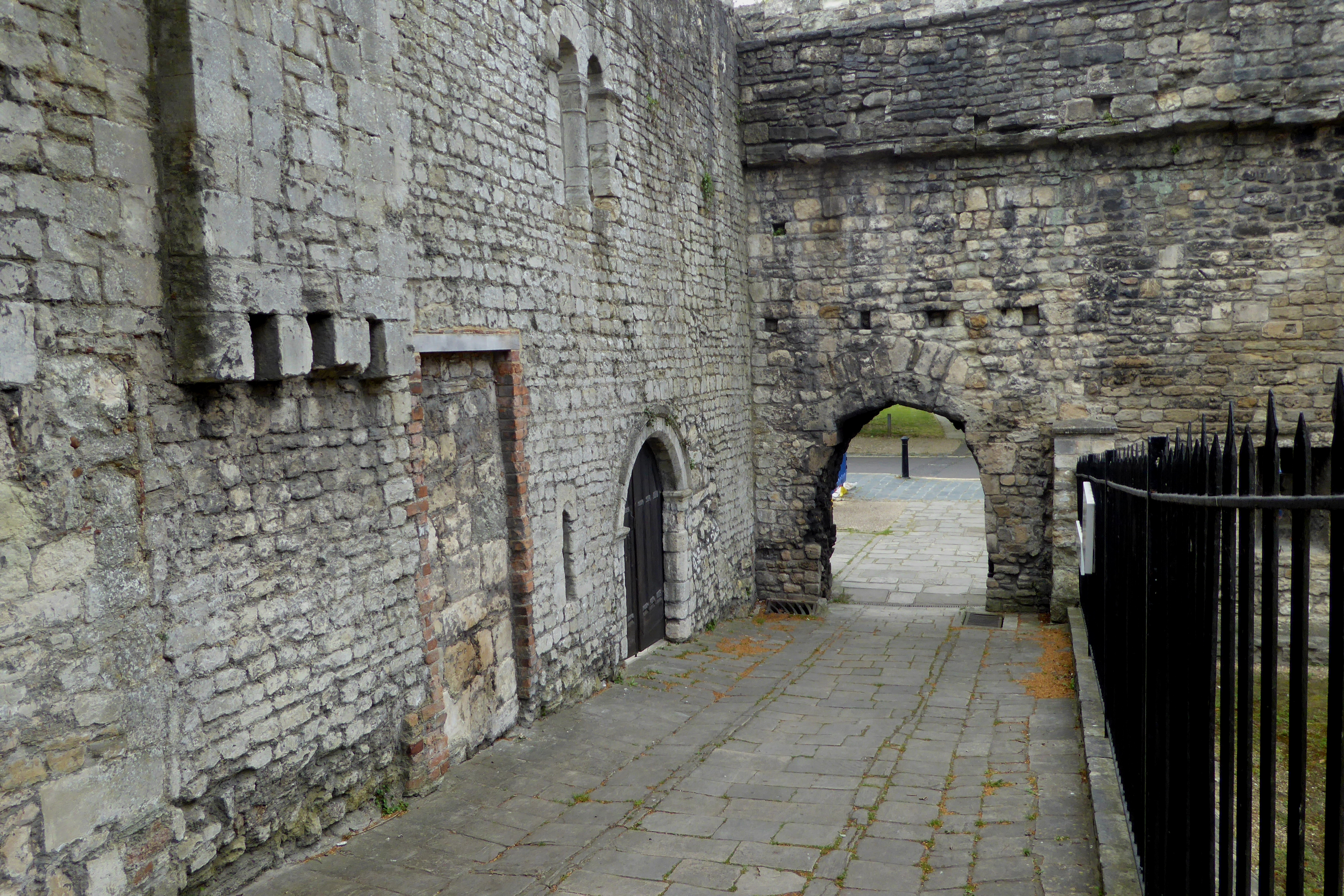
Northern wall of King John's Palace (left) and Southampton's town wall (right) along Blue Anchor Lane

The original house was built either in the 1180s or around 1170 on the quayside, with direct access to the town's West Quay. In the early 14th century the house was owned by Mayor John Wytegod, who was a wealthy merchant. The street alongside the house, now named Blue Anchor Lane, was called Wytegod's Lane after the mayor. In 1338 the largely defenceless town fell victim to a French raid as part of the English Channel naval campaign, 1338–1339; following this, Edward III ordered that Southampton's sea defences be strengthened. As a result, the house became part of the town's defensive wall and the door and windows which faced the quay were blocked or converted into gun slits.

The building became a coach house and stables in the early 18th century and housed a coal merchant's business in the early 19th. At the beginning of the 20th century the building housed a private museum belonging to a Mr Spranger. The roof was removed in the early 20th century, leaving the building a shell, which is how it remains. The building is known as King John's Palace today, as historians originally believed King John resided in the building in the early 13th century; however, this belief is now understood to be incorrect.

== Description ==
The house consisted of two storeys, with the living quarters on the first floor including large windows and a fireplace. Casks of wine imported from France were stored on the ground floor level; the windows here were deliberately small to prevent thieves from accessing the store rooms. It is constructed of stone.

The original 12th-century windows can be seen on the north and west faces of the building; they are round-headed and sit in round-arched frames, with two windows on each side. The three archways which led to the quays – one original round-headed arch and two segmental-headed arches from the early 14th century – are visible in the house's west wall, but they are blocked. These arches contain two vertical defensive slits from the 14th-century defences, which may be Britain's earliest surviving gunports.

The first floor fireplace was located on the north side of the house. Surviving remains of the fireplace include both jambs with their scalloped capitals and inset shafts. A chimney constructed around 1200 was removed from another property in the city, 79A High Street, and is now located against the east wall of King John's Palace. The chimney has a square base but a long round shaft.
