= King James's and Landport Gates =

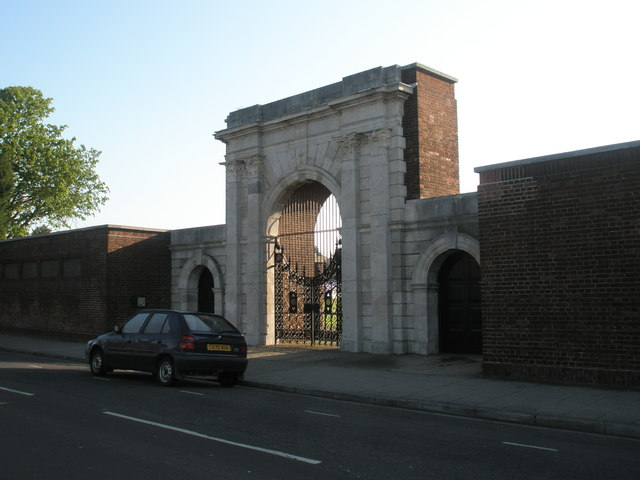
King James's Gate

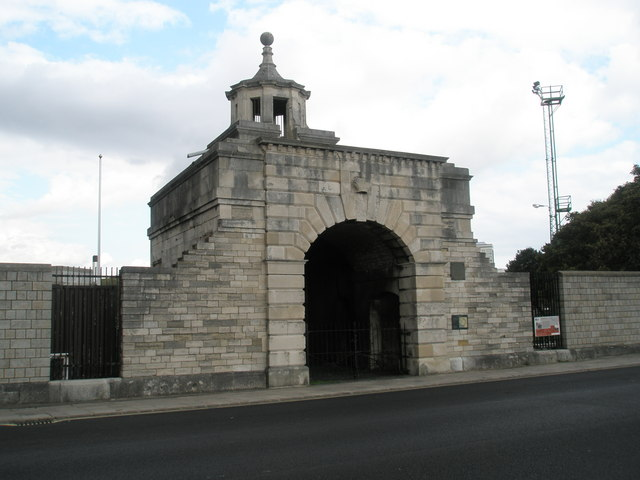
Landport Gate

King James's and Landport Gates are two English Heritage gateways in Portsmouth, Hampshire, England.

== Original purpose ==
Earthen ramparts protecting the land side of the port containing munitions, international goods storage, warehouses, shops and homes were constructed in the 14th century which were strengthened by order of Henry VIII in the 16th.

Four ornate gateways were originally access points to Portsmouth through the town walls. The majority of the town walls were demolished in 1860.

== King James's Gate ==
50°47′44.96″N 1°5′54.7″W
King James's Gate was built in 1687, probably as a reconstruction of the older Point gate on the same site, to control access to Portsmouth from The Point. When the town walls were demolished the gate was moved to a pavement of St. Michaels Road. At a later, unknown, date it was moved again and is now roughly 0.5 miles (0.80 km) from its original position, forming part of the boundary of United Services Ground in Burnaby Road. During the moves, much of the original ornate stonework was purposefully sold or lost.

== Landport Gate ==
50°47′36.8″N 1°6′3.3″W
Landport Gate was built in 1760 as a new main entry point to Portsmouth from the Dockyard and growing community on the Common. It replaced the original main point of access at the end of the High Street. Unlike the majority of Portsmouth's defences, the gate is still in its original position.
