= List of public art in Hampshire =

This is a list of public art in Hampshire, in England. This list applies only to works of public art accessible in an outdoor public space. For example, this does not include artwork visible inside a museum.

== Aldershot ==
Image	Title / subject	Location and coordinates	Date	Artist / designer	Type	Material	Dimensions	Designation	Wikidata	Notes
More images	RAMC Memorial, Aldershot	Gun Hill, Aldershot 51.2536°N 0.7613°W	1905	Goscombe John	Sculpture group, obelisk and wall with plaques	Bronze and granite		Grade II	Q26672950	Architect, Robert Weir Schultz

== Alton ==
Image	Title / subject	Location and coordinates	Date	Artist / designer	Type	Material	Dimensions	Designation	Wikidata	Notes
More images	Bear	Westbrook Walk, Alton	2005	Mark Coreth	Statue	Bronze				

== Basingstoke ==
Image	Title / subject	Location and coordinates	Date	Artist / designer	Type	Material	Dimensions	Designation	Wikidata	Notes
	Rhythm, Strength and Movement	Basing View, Basingstoke 51.267626°N 1.081992°W	1987	Robert Erskine	Sculpture	Weathered steel				Commissioned by Sun Life Canada
	Blue Coat Boy	Cross Street, Basingstoke 51.2636°N 1.0885°W	1994		Statue on pedestal				Q59781088	Owned by Basingstoke Heritage Society
	L'Arc	Alencon Link, Basingstoke 51.2680°N 1.0884°W	1999	David Annand	Sculpture group					
	Poppy	Churchill Way, Basingstoke	1996	Tom Merrifield	Statue on pedestal					
	Sailing By Stars	Railway station, Basingstoke 51.2680°N 1.0884°W	1990	Sarah Tombs	Sculpture group	Bronze				
	The Family	London Street, Basingstoke 51.2624°N 1.0858°W	1993	Mike Smith		Bronze				
	The Church Stone	Wote Street, Basingstoke 51.2636°N 1.0864°W	1994	Michael Pegler		Granite				Nicknamed the "Wote Street Willy"
	Jane Austen	Outside Willis Museum, Market Place, Basingstoke 51.2627°N 1.0870°W	2017	Adam Roud		Bronze				

== Eastleigh ==
Image	Title / subject	Location and coordinates	Date	Artist / designer	Type	Material	Dimensions	Designation	Wikidata	Notes
	Entry Effected	Leigh Road, Eastleigh 50.9729°N 1.3716°W	2008	Les Johnson	Statue	Bronze				
	The Fourth Arm	Leigh Road, Eastleigh 50.9729°N 1.3716°W	1995	Les Johnson	Statue	Bronze				
More images	Eastleigh Lakeside Park Art Trail	Lakeside Country Park, Eastleigh 50.9569°N 1.3668°W	c. 2018	Nicola Henshaw	9 plaques	Corten steel				
	Pirelli Arch	Pirelli Park, Eastleigh 50.9479°N 1.3651°W	c. 2012	Codsteaks	Sculpture	Mild Steel				
	Proud to Serve	Leigh Road, Eastleigh 50.9729°N 1.3716°W	1998	Les Johnson	Statue	Bronze				
	The Railwayman	Leigh Road, Eastleigh 50.9694°N 1.3532°W	1995	Jill Tweed	Statue	Bronze				
	Spitfire	Mitchell Way, Southampton Airport, Eastleigh 50.950278°N 1.356667°W	2004	Alan Manning	Airplane replica		Wing span 24ft			
	Charlotte Mary Yonge	Railway Station Concourse, Eastleigh 50.96929°N 1.35034°W	2015	Vivien Mallock	Statue & bench	Bronze				Owned by Eastleigh Borough Council

== Fareham ==
Image	Title / subject	Location and coordinates	Date	Artist / designer	Type	Material	Dimensions	Designation	Wikidata	Notes
	Anvil Man	Fareham		Stephen Lunn	Sculpture					

== Gosport ==
Image	Title / subject	Location and coordinates	Date	Artist / designer	Type	Material	Dimensions	Designation	Wikidata	Notes
	Nat Gonella Tribute	Gosport 50.792584°N 1.145465°W			Sculpture	Metal				
More images	John Fieldhouse, Baron Fieldhouse	Falklands Gardens, Gosport	1993	Jill Tweed	Bust on pedestal	Bronze & concrete				

== Lasham ==
Image	Title / subject	Location and coordinates	Date	Artist / designer	Type	Material	Dimensions	Designation	Wikidata	Notes
	The Alpha Lima Armillary Sphere	Lasham Airfield, Lasham 51.189383°N 1.035292°W	2005		Armillary sphere	Metal				

== Petersfield ==
Image	Title / subject	Location and coordinates	Date	Artist / designer	Type	Material	Dimensions	Designation	Wikidata	Notes
More images	Equestrian statue of William III, Petersfield	The Square, Petersfield 51.0039°N 0.9374°W	18th century, restored 1912	Henry Cheere	Equestrian statue on pedestal	Lead & stone		Grade I	Q17528308	Erected in its current location in 1812 having previously stood in Petersfield House.

== Portsmouth ==
Image	Title / subject	Location and coordinates	Date	Artist / designer	Type	Material	Dimensions	Designation	Wikidata	Notes
	Jack Star	Tipner Lake 50.8291°N 1.0870°W	2000	Richard Farrington	Sculpture		12 metres (39 ft) tall			
	Jubilee Statue	Gunwharf Quays 50.7955°N 1.1081°W	2002	Vivien Mallock		Bronze	12 feet			Unveiled by HM Queen Elizabeth II on 27 June 2002. The prow of the ship is modeled on the Royal Yacht Britannia.
More images	The Mudlarks	The Hard 50.7986°N 1.1073°W	2010	Michael Peacock	Statue	Bronze				
	Remembrance Poppy	Bishop Street, Portsmouth		Coastguard Studio						
More images	Sails of the South / Tri-Sail	M275 motorway 50.8331°N 1.0858°W	2001				43 metres (141 ft) tall		Q7400459	
More images	Horatio Nelson	Grand Parade 50.7891°N 1.1052°W	1951	Frederick Brook Hitch	Statue on pedestal	Bronze		Grade II	Q26397862	Originally sited in Pembroke Gardens
More images	Queen Victoria	Guildhall Square 50.7964°N 1.0818°W	1903	Alfred Drury	Statue on pedestal	Bronze		Grade II	Q26398294	
More images	Portsmouth Naval Memorial	Southsea Common 50.7764°N 1.0899°W	1924	Sir Robert Lorimer	Obelisk on plinth	Portland stone		Grade I	Q20712306	Commonwealth War Graves Commission site
More images	Portsmouth War Memorial	Guildhall Square 50.7982°N 1.0925°W	1921	James Glen Sivewright Gibson, Walter Gordon, Charles Sargeant Jagger	Cenotaph with surround & statues	Portland stone		Grade II*	Q26263431	
More images	Crimea War Memorial	Clarence Esplanade 50.7808°N 1.0935°W	1857	HJ Andrews, J King & Sons	Obelisk	Portland stone		Grade II	Q26666638	
	Whale's Tail	Gunwharf Quays 50.7952°N 1.1046°W	2008	Richard Farrington	Sculpture	Bronze				
More images	Bonds of Friendship	Sally Port 50.7896°N 1.1067°W	1979	John Robinson	Sculpture	Bronze	5 feet (1.5 m) x 3 feet (0.91 m)			Unveiled by Queen Elizabeth II in 1979 to mark where the First Fleet left England for Australia. There is a similar sculpture located where they arrived in Sydney.
	Bust of Charles I	Square Tower 50.7894°N 1.1064°W	Late 20th century copy	Hubrecht le Sueur	Bust	Gilded lead				Inscription below reads "After his travels through all France into Spain and having passed very many dangers both by sea and land he arrived here the 5th day of October 1623"
More images	Vernon Mine Warfare and Diving Monument	Gunwharf Quays 50.795°N 1.1058°W	2020	Mark Richards	Sculpture	Bronze			Q119931106	Commemorates those who served at HMS Vernon which was located on the present Gunwharf Quays site.
More images	Figurehead of HMS Vernon	Gunwharf Quays 50.7949°N 1.1065°W	1832		Figurehead	Wood				Figurehead from the 50-gun frigate HMS Vernon launched in 1832 and later used for torpedo training.
More images	Figurehead of HMS Marlborough	Gunwharf Quays 50.7943°N 1.1081°W	1855		Figurehead	Wood				Figurehead from the 131-gun ship HMS Marlborough launched in 1855 and later used for torpedo training.
	Man and Globe	Gunwharf Quays 50.7938°N 1.1069°W	2001	Giles Penny	Sculpture					
More images	Charles Dickens	Guildhall Square 50.7973°N 1.0924°W	2014	Martin Jennings	Statue	Bronze				The first statue of Charles Dickens in the UK. It was opposed by some as Dickens had expressed a desire for no memorials in his will.
	Jubilee Fountain	Commercial Road 50.8003°N 1.090°W	1977		Fountain					Built for the 1977 Silver Jubilee of Elizabeth II, and refurbished in 2011. The sculptures are copies of The Queen's Beasts.
	HMS Sirius	Gunwharf Quays 50.7950°N 1.1064°W	1991		Sculpture	Bronze				Sculpture of HMS Sirius from the First Fleet to Australia. A copy of a sculpture in Sydney, given to Portsmouth as a gift by the people of Australia.
More images	Isambard Kingdom Brunel memorial	St George's Square 50.7965°N 1.1036°W	2006		Sculpture on pedestal					Unveiled to mark 200 years since Brunel's birth

== Romsey ==
Image	Title / subject	Location and coordinates	Date	Artist / designer	Type	Material	Dimensions	Designation	Wikidata	Notes
	The Lantern Seat	Romsey Community Hospital, Romsey 50.992361°N 1.48186°W	2004	Richard Bent						The 1818 back panel in this seat was rescued during the demolition of the sounding arch at Embley Park, the home of Florence Nightingale. A Local blacksmith designed and made the seat in 2004.
More images	Henry John Temple, 3rd Viscount Palmerston	Market Place, Romsey 50.9892°N 1.5000°W	1868	Matthew Noble	Statue on pedestal	Bronze and pink marble		Grade II	Q26525831	

== Southampton ==
Image	Title / subject	Location and coordinates	Date	Artist / designer	Type	Material	Dimensions	Designation	Wikidata	Notes
More images	Mayor Richard Andrews	East Park, Southampton 50.9067°N 1.3934°W	1860	Benjamin Brain	Statue on pedestal	Limestone		Grade II	Q26384355	
More images	Sir Isaac Watts	Watts Park, Southampton 50.9096°N 1.4063°W	1861	Richard Cockle Lucas	Statue on pedestal	Marble		Grade II	Q26384264	
More images	Lord Palmerston	Palmerston Park, Southampton 50.9059°N 1.3897°W	1868	Sharpe	Statue on pedestal			Grade II	Q26473681	
More images	Titanic Engineers' Memorial	East Park, Southampton 50.9102°N 1.4045°W	1914	Romeo Ratman, Ferdinand Victor Blundstone	Sculpture with surround	Bronze & granite		Grade II	Q3529509	
More images	Southampton Cenotaph	Watts Park 50.9097°N 1.4052°W	1920	Sir Edwin Lutyens	Cenotaph with sculpture	Portland stone		Grade I	Q7721865	
	Adam and Eve	Cossack Green, Southampton 50.9054°N 1.4000°W	1951	Sir John Cass School of Art		Concrete				
	Hamtun Street Mural	Hamtun Street 50.9005°N 1.4054°W	1978 (placed in current location 2010)	Henry and Joyce Collins	Mural	Concrete and glass	19 x 3 meters			Owner, Southampton City Council. Originally on the side of a Sainsbury’s superstore in the Lordshill. Removed in 1990, restored and placed in its current location in 2010.
	Three Rings	Ocean Village, Southampton	1990	Jane Ackroyd	Abstract sculpture					
More images	John le Fleming	City walls, Southampton 50.9025°N 1.4048°W	1991	Anthony Griffiths	Statue					Owner, Southampton City Council. John le Fleming (1295–1336) was Mayor of Southampton.
	Child of Family	Havelock Road 50.9072°N 1.4078°W	1993	Danny Lane						
	Sundial	Havelock Road 50.9078°N 1.4081°W	1995	Peter Parkinson						
More images	Enclosure	Watts Park, Southampton 50.9095°N 1.4076°W	2000	Paul de Monchaux		Portland Roach stone				
	Shear	Bevois Valley	2001	Eilis O'Connell						Work represents the sword of Bevis of Hampton
	Northam Shoal	Old Northam Road	2002	Tom Grimsey						
	Ted Bates	St Mary's Stadium, Southampton 50.905903°N 1.389665°W	2008	Sean Hedges-Quinn	Statue on pedestal					Second statue of Bates, the original by sculptor Ian Brennan was widely criticized by supporters and was removed soon after its unavailing.
	Southampton Mural 2013	Castle Way, Southampton 50.899777°N 1.404890°W	2013	Joanna Dewfall	Mural					Owned by Southampton City Council
	Southampton Friary	Friary House, Briton Street, Southampton	1987		Tiled mural	Ceramic				

== Stratfield Saye ==
Image	Title / subject	Location and coordinates	Date	Artist / designer	Type	Material	Dimensions	Designation	Wikidata	Notes
	Statue of Arthur Wellesley, 1st Duke of Wellington	The Wellington Monument, Stratfield Saye House, Stratfield Saye 51.349°N 0.9714°W	1866	Carlo Marochetti	Statue	Bronze		Grade II	Q26384539	

== Whitchurch ==
Image	Title / subject	Location and coordinates	Date	Artist / designer	Type	Material	Dimensions	Designation	Wikidata	Notes
More images	Painted bollards	Town Centre, Whitchurch, Hampshire 51.2300°N 1.3389°W	2010-2013			Painted steel				A series of bollards, painted by members of the local community.

== Winchester ==
Image	Title / subject	Location and coordinates	Date	Artist / designer	Type	Material	Dimensions	Designation	Wikidata	Notes
	John Colborne, 1st Baron Seaton	Royal Green Jackets (Rifles) Museum	1866	George Gammon Adams	Statue on pedestal					
More images	Queen Victoria	Winchester Great Hall	1887	Alfred Gilbert	Seated statue on pedestal	Bronze		Grade I		
More images	Alfred the Great	The Broadway, Winchester 51.061219°N 1.308700°W	1901	Hamo Thornycroft	Statue on pedestal	Bronze and Penryn granite	Statue;- 15 feet	Grade II	Q26461216	
More images	The King's Royal Rifle Corps War Memorial	Cathedral Close, Winchester	1922	John Tweed	Statue on pedestal	Bronze & limestone		Grade II*	Q55742851	
More images	Horse and Rider	High Street, Winchester	1983	Elisabeth Frink	Equestrian statue	Bronze	224cm high	Grade II	Q55753820	
More images	Painted bollards	Great Minster Street and The Square, Winchester 50.9694°N 1.3532°W	2005-2012	The Colour Factory	24 bollards	Painted steel				Owned by Winchester City Council. Bollards painted in the style of famous artists, or with topical scenes.
More images	Licoricia of Winchester	Jewry Street, Winchester 51.0655°N 1.3160°W	2022	Ian Rank-Broadley	Statue group	Bronze				
