= Joseph Bell (engineer) =

British maritime engineer (1861–1912)

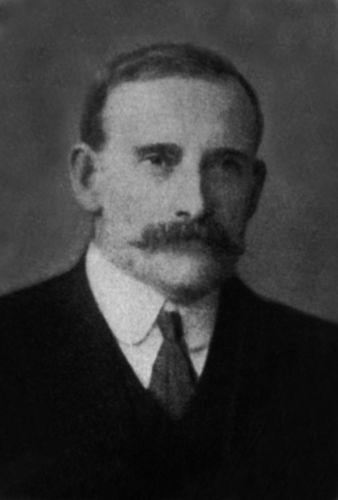
- Joseph Bell
- Born: 4 May 1861; Farlam, Cumberland, United Kingdom
- Died: 15 April 1912 (aged 50); North Atlantic Ocean
- Occupation: Maritime engineer
- Known for: Chief engineer of RMS Titanic
- Spouse: Maud Bates (m. 1892)
- Children: 4

Joseph Bell (4 May 1861 – 15 April 1912) was a British engineer who served as chief engineer of the RMS Titanic during the ship's ill-fated maiden voyage. All the engineers died in the sinking; his body, if recovered, has never been identified.

== Early life ==
Joseph Bell was born in May 1861 in Farlam, Cumberland. (Note: When he signed aboard the ship on 2 April, he gave his age as 50. Some sources, such as the National Archives, cite Bell's age as 51, but if born in May 1861, he would have turned 51 shortly after the sinking.) He was the first son of John Bell Sr. and Margaret Watson, both agricultural entrepreneurs. He had three siblings: Jane (born 1864), Richard (1865) and John Jr. (1868). His mother, Margaret, died shortly after giving birth to her last child.

After the death of his mother, he moved with his father and brothers to Carlisle, in Eden Town, Stanwix. There, he and his siblings attended a boarding school in Earl Street. In 1876, after leaving Stanwix, Bell moved to Newcastle upon Tyne, serving his engineering apprenticeship as an engine fitter at the Tyneside works of Robert Stephenson and Company.

== White Star Line ==
In 1885, Bell was hired by the White Star Line and worked in the engineering department of many ships carrying cargo and passengers to New Zealand and the United States. In 1889, he was appointed 3rd engineer of RMS Teutonic. The next year, he was appointed 2nd engineer of RMS Majestic. The year after that, he was promoted once again to chief mechanical engineer of SS Coptic.

Bell became one of the White Star Line's most trusted engineers and was sent to Belfast to oversee the construction and installation of the engines of a number of new White Star liners, including SS Laurentic and SS Megantic in 1908 and 1909. He subsequently took each of these liners out for their first few voyages, serving as Chief Engineer. During Olympic's building, Bell had remained in Belfast throughout the process, superintending construction, overseeing the installation of the ship's powerplant, and "making any suggestions which he thought would lead to improvements."

Bell served as Chief Engineer during the maiden voyage of RMS Olympic. He then returned to Belfast, and Robert Fleming, another White Star senior engineer, was promoted to chief engineer on Olympic.

=== RMS Titanic ===
Bell was present as the engines of RMS Titanic were constructed and assembled at the yard Engine Works. He formally signed on to the ship on 2 April, when the sea trials began. As Chief engineer, he was head of the engineering department which consisted of over 300 crewmembers including engineers, coal trimmers, greasers, and firemen. Assisting him was William Farquharson, the Senior Second Engineer.

Following a coal bunker fire in Boiler Room No. 5, extinguished on 13 April, Bell ordered Leading Fireman Frederick Barrett to arrange an inspection of the watertight bulkhead. While anchored in Queenstown, White Star Line Chairman J. Bruce Ismay called Bell to his cabin and discussed the matter of the ship's performance.

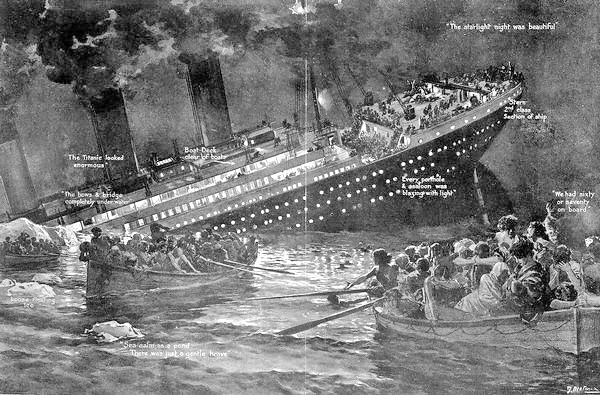
Illustration of the sinking of the Titanic

On the night of 14 April, shortly before Titanic hit the iceberg, the engine crew received an order from the bridge to stop the engines in an attempt to slow the ship. Despite the crew's best efforts, Titanic could not avoid the iceberg and just scrapped by it. After the collision, Ismay, while returning from the bridge met Bell near the "main companionway" and asked him if he believed that the ship was seriously damaged. Bell told him, "he thought the damage was serious, but that he hoped the pumps would be able to control the water."

Quartermaster Alfred Olliver entered the engine room to find Bell at work and gave him a message from Captain Smith. Bell looked at the note and went back to work. When Bell asked what he wanted, Olliver stated that he was waiting for a response to the Captain's message. Bell told him to tell the Captain that "he would get it done as soon as possible." According to coal trimmer Thomas Dillon, Bell ordered the watertight doors forward of the engine room until Boiler Room no. 4 to be open to allow the engineers to do their duty with the valves and pumps.

Bell's last possible sighting was by Second Officer Charles Lightoller, who wrote in his autobiography that he saw all the engineers on deck before the ship went down. Titanic sank at 2:20 A.M. on 15 April. Bell and all the other engineers aboard the ship were among the approximately 1,500 people who perished. His body was likely never recovered.

=== Death ===
Bell and the engineers are believed to have remained in the engine room, urging the stokers and firemen to keep the boilers active, allowing the pumps to continue their work and ensuring the electricity remained on as long as possible. Popular belief persisted that Bell and his men stayed below decks, never abandoning their posts, working to keep the lights and the power on in order for distress signals to get out, and they all died inside of Titanic. However, there is evidence to suggest that at least some of the engineers were released to come on deck when the flooding by 1:20 A.M. became severe; between approximately 1:50 and 1:55 A.M., Greaser Frederick Scott testified to seeing eight engineers standing up against the electric crane on the starboard Boat Deck; by then, all the lifeboats had gone with the exception of two collapsible rafts which were subsequently washed off deck before they could be launched.

== Personal life ==
Bell married Maud Bates in 1892, and they moved to Tottenham, Middlesex. The couple had four children: Frances John, called Frank (1896), Marjorie Clare (1899), Eileen Maud (1901), and Ralph Douglas (1908). Shortly after the birth of Eileen, the family moved to Crosby, Lancashire.

In 1911, Bell found lodging in Belfast, along with his wife and younger son. Their two daughters remained in Crosby, cared for by both a housekeeper and their aunt and uncle, Bell's sister Jane and brother-in-law William Hugh Lowthian. while the then fifteen-year-old Frank was studying at the Grosvenor College in Carlisle and later did an apprenticeship at the Harland & Wolff shipyards.

After his death, Bell's wife and brother-in-law, William Ralph, inherited his farm in Farlam; he had become its full owner since 1904 after his father's death. Bell's wife and children never lived there; the farm was managed by family relatives and later sold.

== Legacy ==
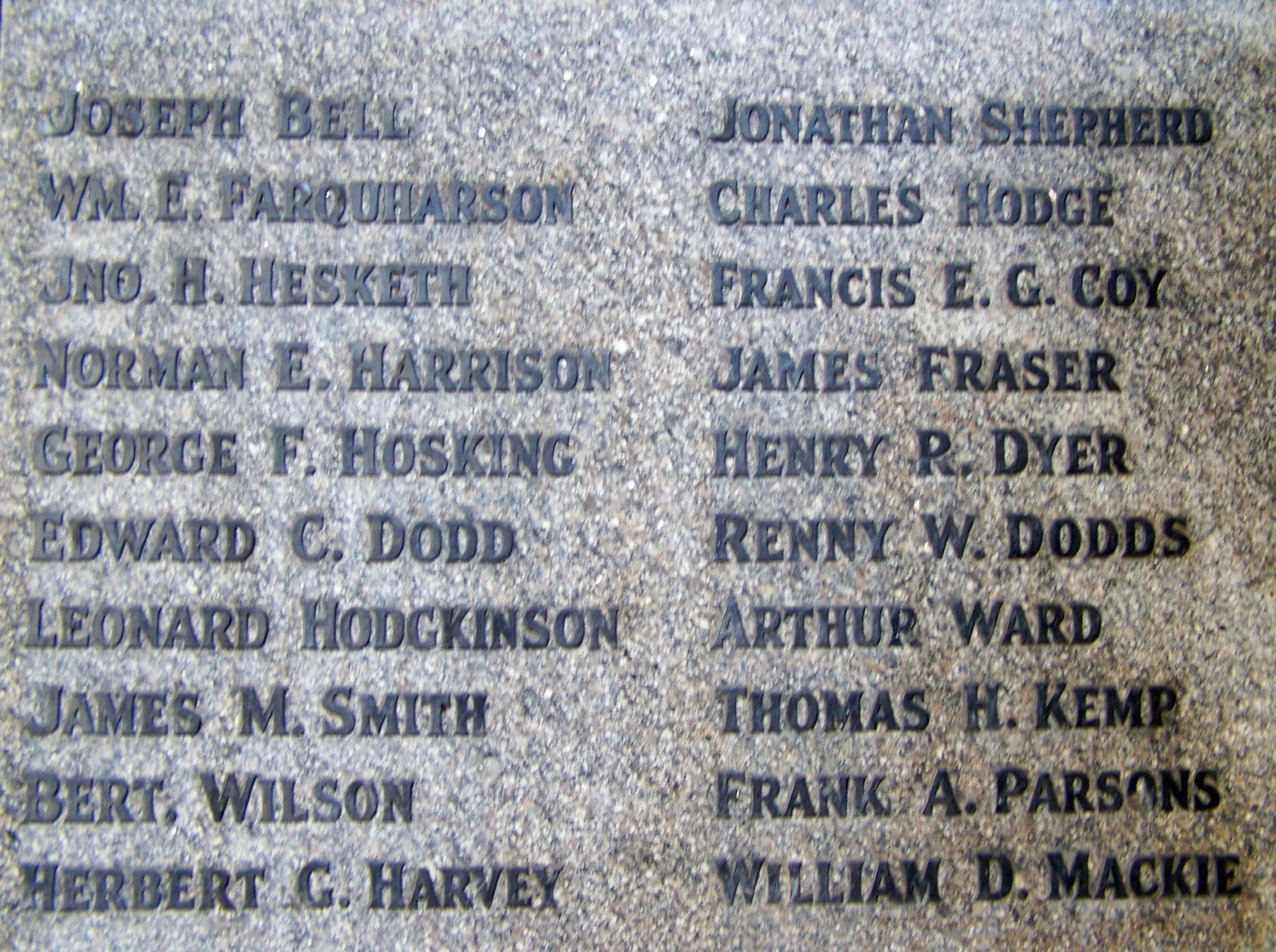
Bell's name, along with a number of other engineers, on the Titanic Engineers' Memorial in Southampton

The parish church of St Faith in Waterloo near Liverpool has a plate commemorating Bell. The village cemetery at Farlam also has a memorial to Bell. The Titanic Engineers' Memorial in Southampton names and commemorates Bell and the other engineers of the ship.

=== Portrayals ===
- Harry Cording (1953) - Titanic
- Emerton Court (1958) - A Night to Remember (British film)
- Tony Haygarth (1979) - S.O.S. Titanic (TV Movie)
- Stephen Dimopoulos (1996) - Titanic (miniseries)
- Terry Forrestal (1997) - Titanic
- Rhidian Bridge (2011) - Curiosity: What Sank Titanic? (TV episode)
- David Wilmot (2012) - Saving The Titanic; PBS TV Movie
