= Equestrian statue of William III, Petersfield =

Statue in Petersfield, Hampshire

Coordinates: 51.0038°N 0.9374°W

Equestrian statue of William III
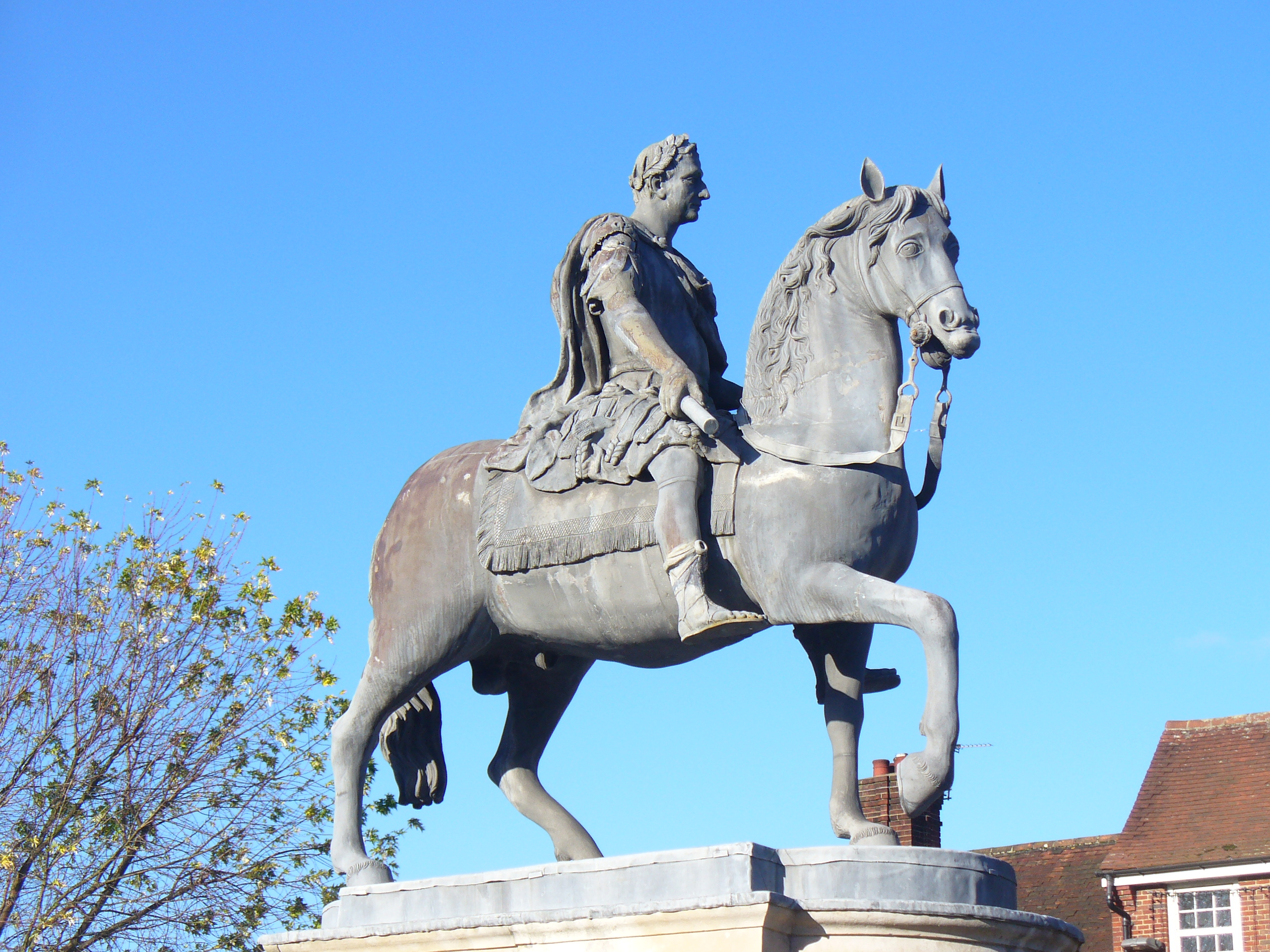
- Artist: generally attributed to John or Henry Cheere
- Completion date: 18th century
- Type: Equestrian statue
- Medium: Lead
- Subject: William III
- Location: Petersfield

Listed Building – Grade I
- Official name: Statue of William III
- Designated: 29 July 1949
- Reference no.: 1093567

The equestrian statue of William III stands in The Square, Petersfield, Hampshire, England. Dating from the 18th century, it has been attributed to John Cheere or possibly to his brother, Henry. The statue is a Grade I listed structure.

== History ==
William III, Prince of Orange, ascended the English throne in 1688 following the overthrow of James II in the Glorious Revolution. William ruled jointly with his wife, Mary, James's daughter, until her death in 1694, and then solely until his own death in 1702. In the 18th century, it became fairly common for members of the Whig Ascendancy to assert their support for the Protestant Succession, and by implication their opposition to the Jacobite challenge, by commemorating William. This approach was adopted in Petersfield by William Jolliffe, who served as member of parliament for Petersfield from 1734 to 1741. a borough controlled by his family. Jolliffe left £500 in his will for the erection of a statue of William, which was sculpted in c.1757 and placed at the entrance to Petersfield House, the Jolliffe home in the town. Following the demolition of the house in the 1790s, the statue was moved to its present position in The Square. Purchased by the town council in 1911, it underwent a major restoration in 1913. It was again restored in 2023. (Note: William III's symbolic importance to the cause of Ulster Protestantism saw the statue become the subject of some local controversy at the time of the 2023 restoration. A tribute march-past by members of the Portsmouth lodge of the Loyal Orange Institution of England was disrupted by pro-Catholic and pro-Irish independence hecklers, and a public debate as to the appropriateness of the statue in the 21st century was conducted in the local media.)

== Description ==
The sculpture is in lead and depicts William in the style of a Roman senator, mounted on a horse. The statue was originally gilded. It stands on a stone plinth. The front of the plinth carries an original Latin inscription, which is translated in a modern dedicatory plaque attached to the side. Historic England's listing record does not ascribe a name to the sculptor but most sources follow Pevsner. Michael Bullen, James Crook and Rodney Hubbuck, in their Hampshire: Winchester and the North volume in the Buildings of England series, revised and published in 2010, confidently attribute it to John Cheere, although they suggest that the original design may have been by his elder brother, Henry. The attribution is not, however, universally accepted. In 2003, the Reviewing Committee on the Export of Works of Art, when considering the case of a sculpture by Henry Cheere of the lawyer George Cooke, described the Petersfield statue as "one of [Henry Cheere's] largest undertakings".

The statue was designated a Grade I listed structure, the highest grading given to buildings and structures of "exceptional interest", in 1949.

== Gallery ==
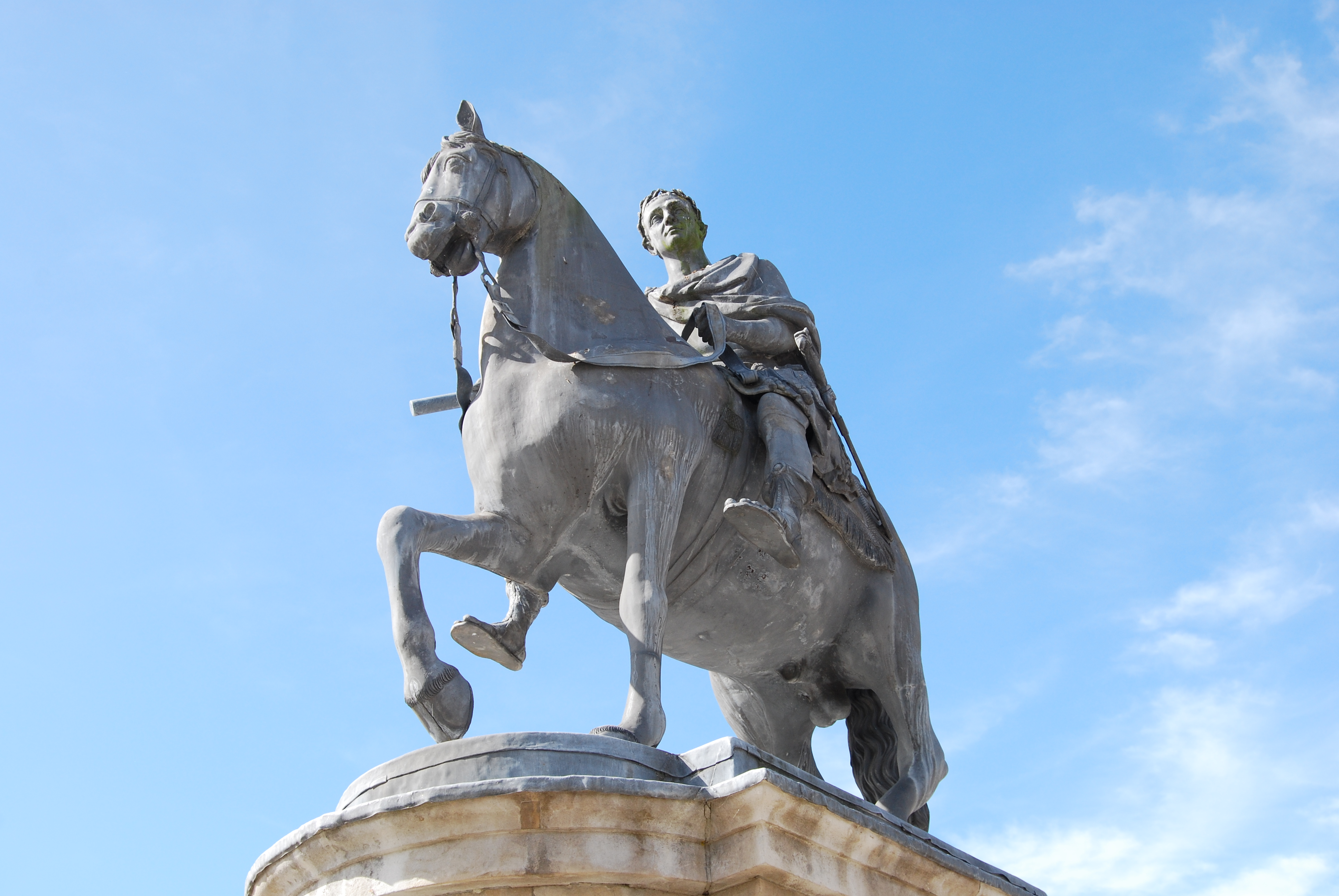
Oblique view

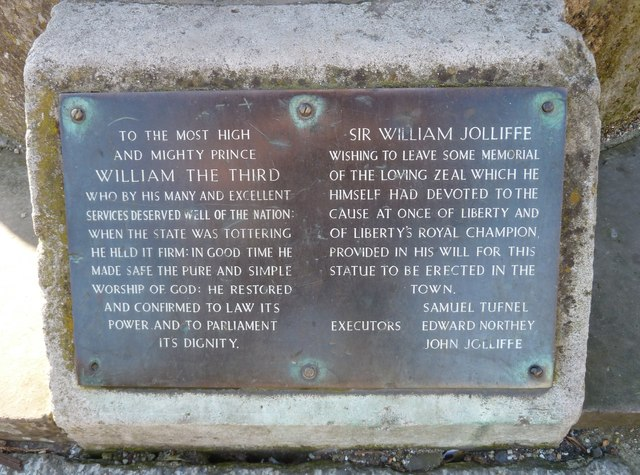
Dedicatory plaque

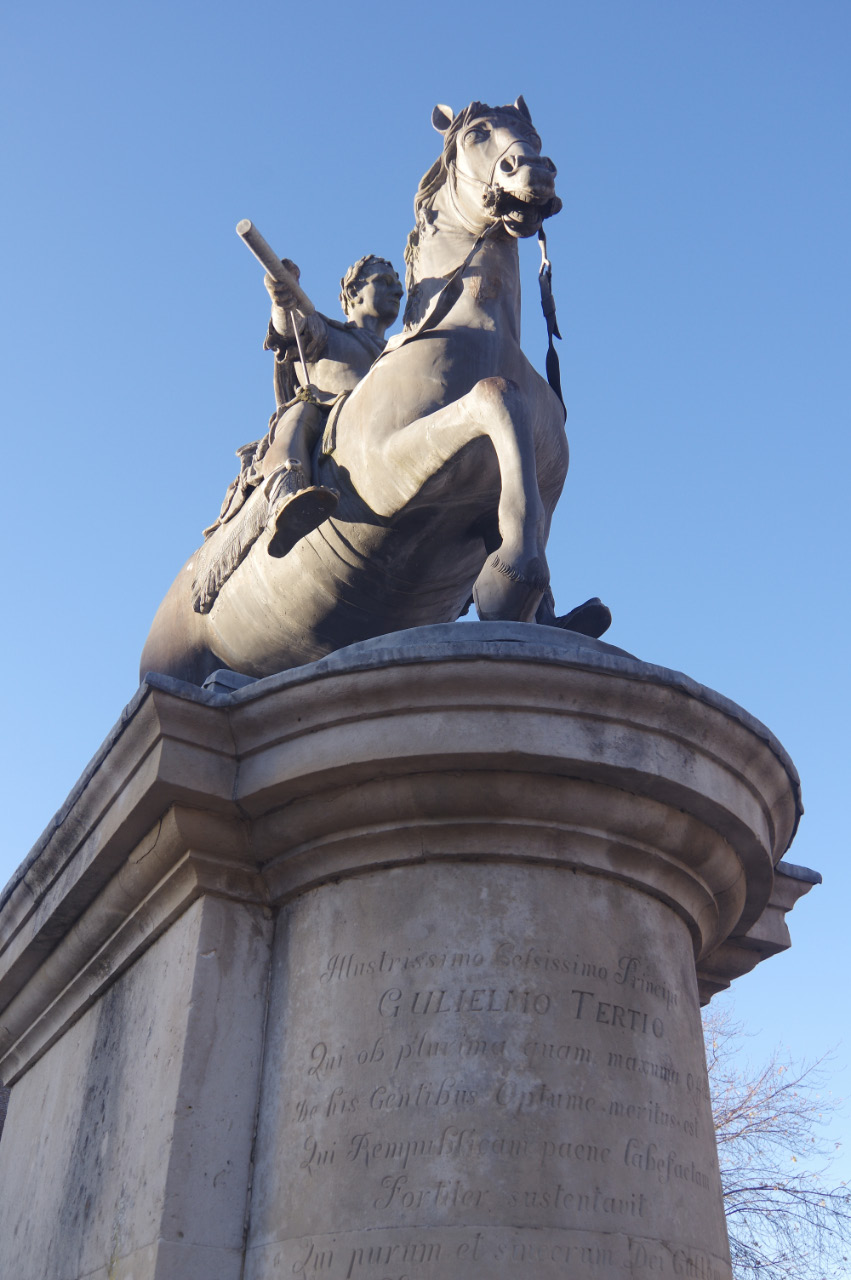
Part of the memorial inscription on the plinth

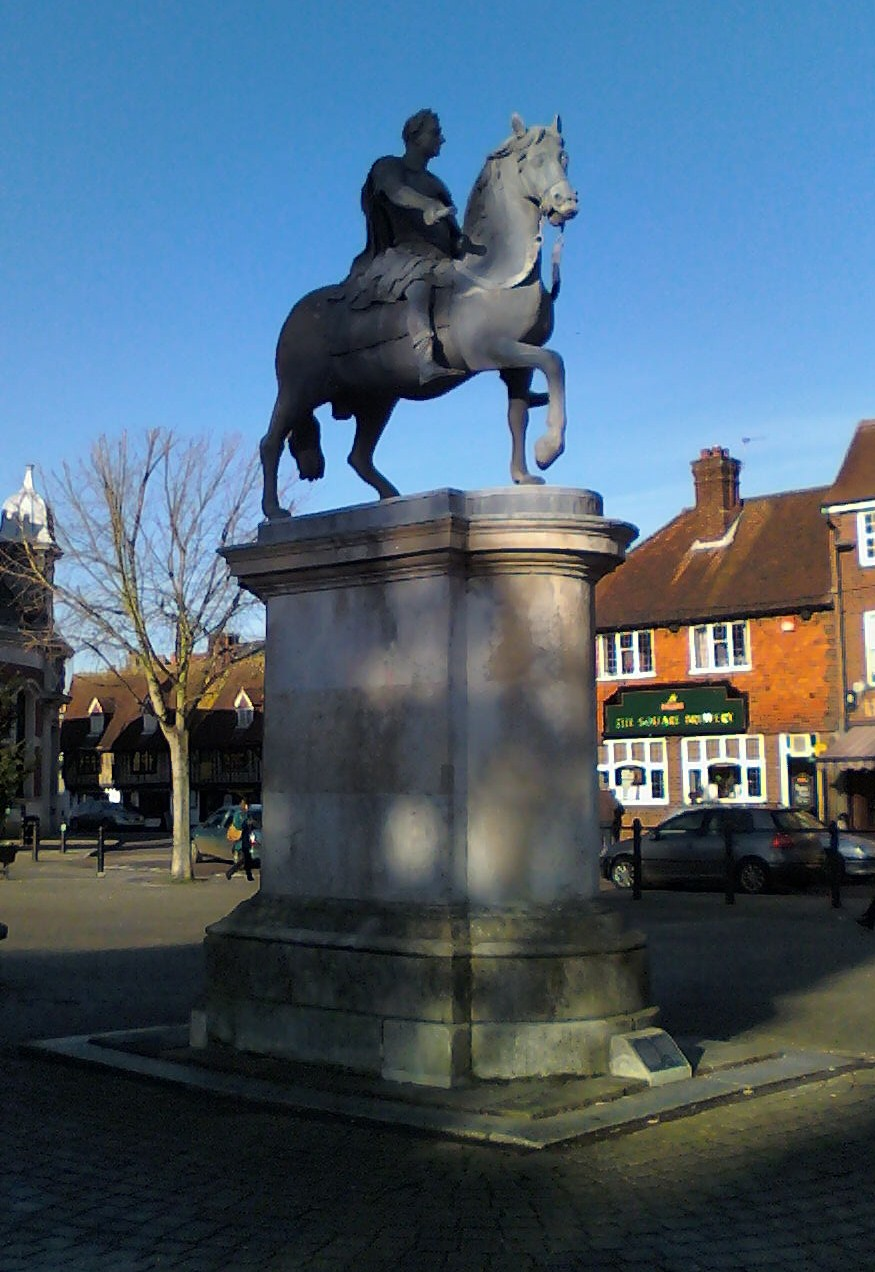
View of plinth and setting

== See also ==
- Grade I listed buildings in Hampshire
- List of public art in Hampshire

== Sources ==
- Bullen, Michael; Crook, John; Hubbuck, Rodney; Pevsner, Nikolaus (2019). Hampshire: Winchester and the North. Pevsner Buildings of England. New Haven, US and London: Yale University Press. ISBN 978-0-300-12084-4. OCLC 1166584857.
- Page, William (1908). A History of the County of Hampshire and the Isle of Wight. Victoria County History. Vol. 3. London: Victoria County History. OCLC 927027156.
- Troost, Wouter (2005). William III, The Stadholder-king: A Political Biography. Aldershot, UK: Ashgate Press. ISBN 9780754650713. OCLC 470178112.

== See also ==
- Cultural depictions of William III of England
