= Terry Forrestal =

English actor and stuntman (1948–2000)

- Born: Terrence Philip Julian Forrestal; 13 May 1948; Chesterfield, Derbyshire
- Died: 10 June 2000 (aged 52); Lysefjord, Norway
- Occupations: Stuntman, BASE jumper and actor

Terrence Philip Julian Forrestal (13 May 1948 – 10 June 2000) was an English actor, stuntman and BASE jumper.

Born in Chesterfield, Derbyshire, to Irish parents, he attended Finchley Catholic Grammar School. He served in the British Armed Forces in Northern Ireland, among other places.

He was a stuntman and stunt coordinator since the 1970s. He was also a technical advisor and occasionally an actor on films and TV. His best-known work includes Bond films Moonraker, Octopussy, Never Say Never Again, and GoldenEye, as well as Indiana Jones and the Temple of Doom, Batman (1989), Robin Hood: Prince of Thieves, Braveheart, Titanic and Elizabeth.

He died after a BASE jumping accident on 10 June 2000, in Lysefjord, Norway, aged 52, after attempting to rescue himself from a ledge.

== Filmography ==
Year	Title	Role	Notes
1979	Moonraker	Sgt. Parish (Space Fighter)	Uncredited
1980	Flash Gordon	Hawkman #3	
1985	Brazil	Running Trooper	Uncredited
1992	Double X: The Name of the Game	Swarthy Man	
1996	La lengua asesina	Postman	
1997	Titanic	Chief Engineer Joseph Bell	Final film role
