= Southampton Cenotaph =

War memorial in Southampton, England

- United Kingdom
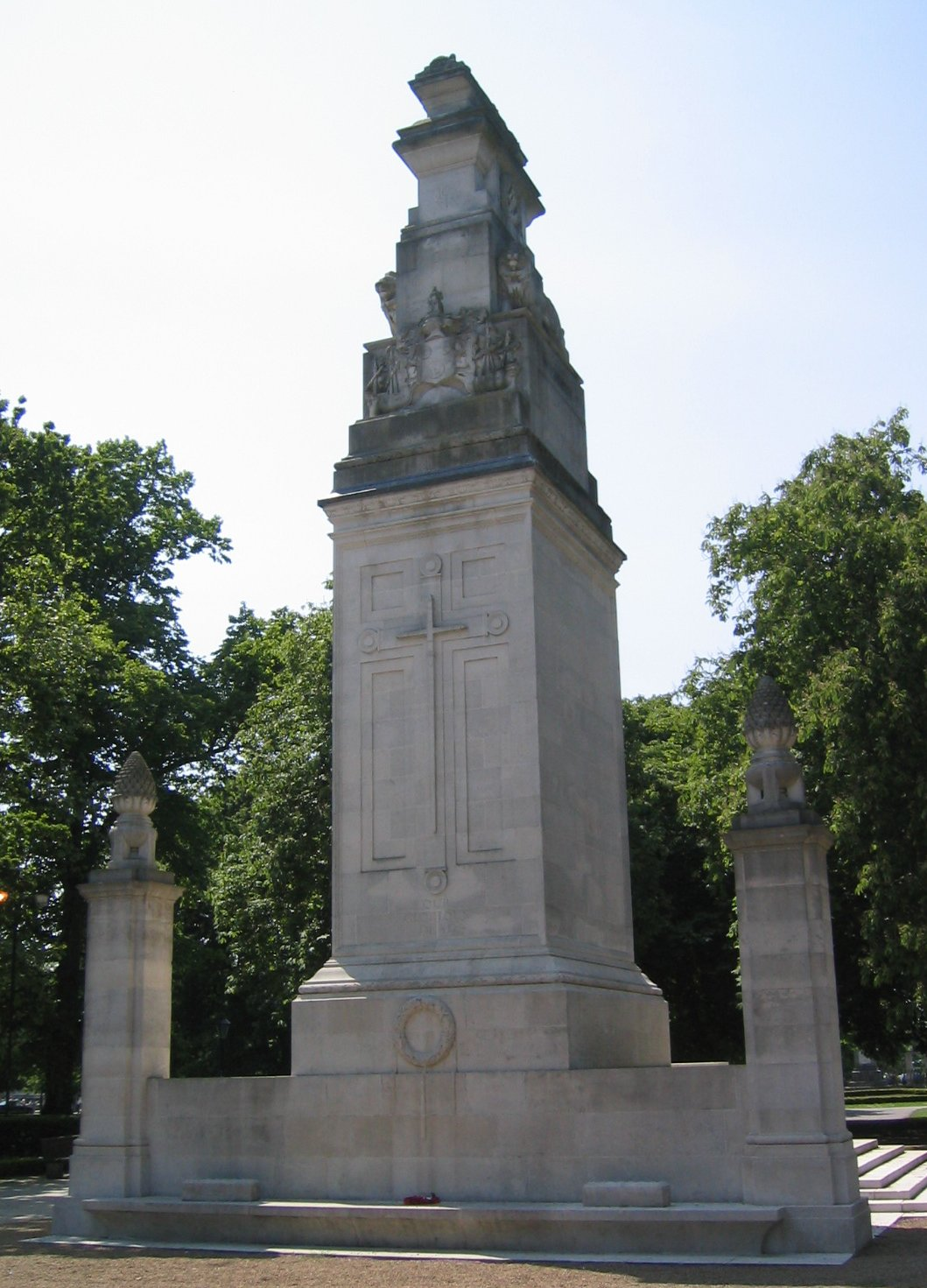
- For casualties of the First World War from Southampton
- Unveiled: 6 November 1920
- Location: 50°54′34.8″N 1°24′18.6″W; Watts Park, Above Bar Street, Southampton
- Designed by: Sir Edwin Lutyens
- OUR GLORIOUS DEAD THEIR NAME LIVETH FOR EVERMORE

Listed Building – Grade I
- Official name: Southampton Cenotaph
- Designated: 8 October 1981
- Reference no.: 1340007

Southampton Cenotaph is a First World War memorial designed by Sir Edwin Lutyens and located in Watts Park in the southern English city of Southampton. The memorial was the first of dozens by Lutyens to be built in permanent form and it influenced his later designs, including the Cenotaph in London. It is a tapering, multi-tiered pylon which culminates in a series of diminishing layers before terminating in a sarcophagus (or cenotaph, 'empty tomb') which features a recumbent figure of a soldier. In front is an altar-like Stone of Remembrance. The cenotaph contains multiple sculptural details including a prominent cross, the town's coat of arms, and two lions. The names of the dead are inscribed on three sides. Although similar in outline, later cenotaphs by Lutyens were much more austere and featured almost no sculpture. The design uses abstract, ecumenical features and lifts the recumbent soldier high above eye level, anonymising him.

The memorial was unveiled at a public ceremony on 6 November 1920. Shortly afterwards, concerns emerged that the list of names on the cenotaph was incomplete. After a newspaper campaign, more than 200 further names were identified and these were eventually added to the cenotaph. The names of most Jewish casualties were omitted, the Jewish community being unhappy that the memorial featured a Christian cross. By the beginning of the 21st century, the engravings on the memorial had deteriorated noticeably. Rather than re-cut them and damage the stonework, they were supplemented by a series of glass panels that bear all the names from the cenotaph, as well as names from the Second World War and later conflicts. The panels were unveiled in 2011. The memorial is a Grade I listed building, having been upgraded in 2015 when Lutyens's war memorials were declared a national collection.

== Background ==
In the aftermath of the First World War and its unprecedented casualties, thousands of war memorials were built across the United Kingdom. Amongst the most prominent designers of memorials was Sir Edwin Lutyens, described by Historic England as "the leading English architect of his generation". Lutyens established his reputation before the war by designing country houses for wealthy clients and through his work on the new Indian Imperial headquarters at New Delhi. The war affected him deeply and, following it, he devoted much of his time to memorialising its casualties. His biographer, Jane Brown, records that, in the 1920s, more than half of his commissions were "for memorials and tombs, (his) clients more the dead than the living". He designed Southampton Cenotaph at around the same as his most famous memorial, The Cenotaph in London. That, along with Lutyens' work for the Imperial War Graves Commission (IWGC), led to commissions for war memorials across Britain and its empire.

Being a major port town, Southampton was heavily involved in the British war effort from the outset. It became the main embarkation point for troops crossing the English Channel to France and the main receiving point for wounded personnel being evacuated back to Britain; much of Southampton Common became an assembly point. Over the course of the war, more than eight million soldiers passed through Southampton on their way to the front. As elsewhere, many men from the town quickly volunteered for military service after Britain declared war on Germany, a preponderance of them joining the Hampshire Regiment. Many others from Southampton served on merchant vessels, several of which were sunk during the course of the war, such as the RMS Alcantara (1913), an armed merchant cruiser sunk in February 1916, and HMHS Asturias, an ocean liner converted to a hospital ship, which was sunk in March 1917. The names of the casualties were routinely printed in the local press. After the Armistice of 11 November 1918, Southampton docks were still busy with military movements, starting with repatriation of prisoners of war and casualties, followed by other soldiers and matériel returning from the front lines.

== Commissioning ==
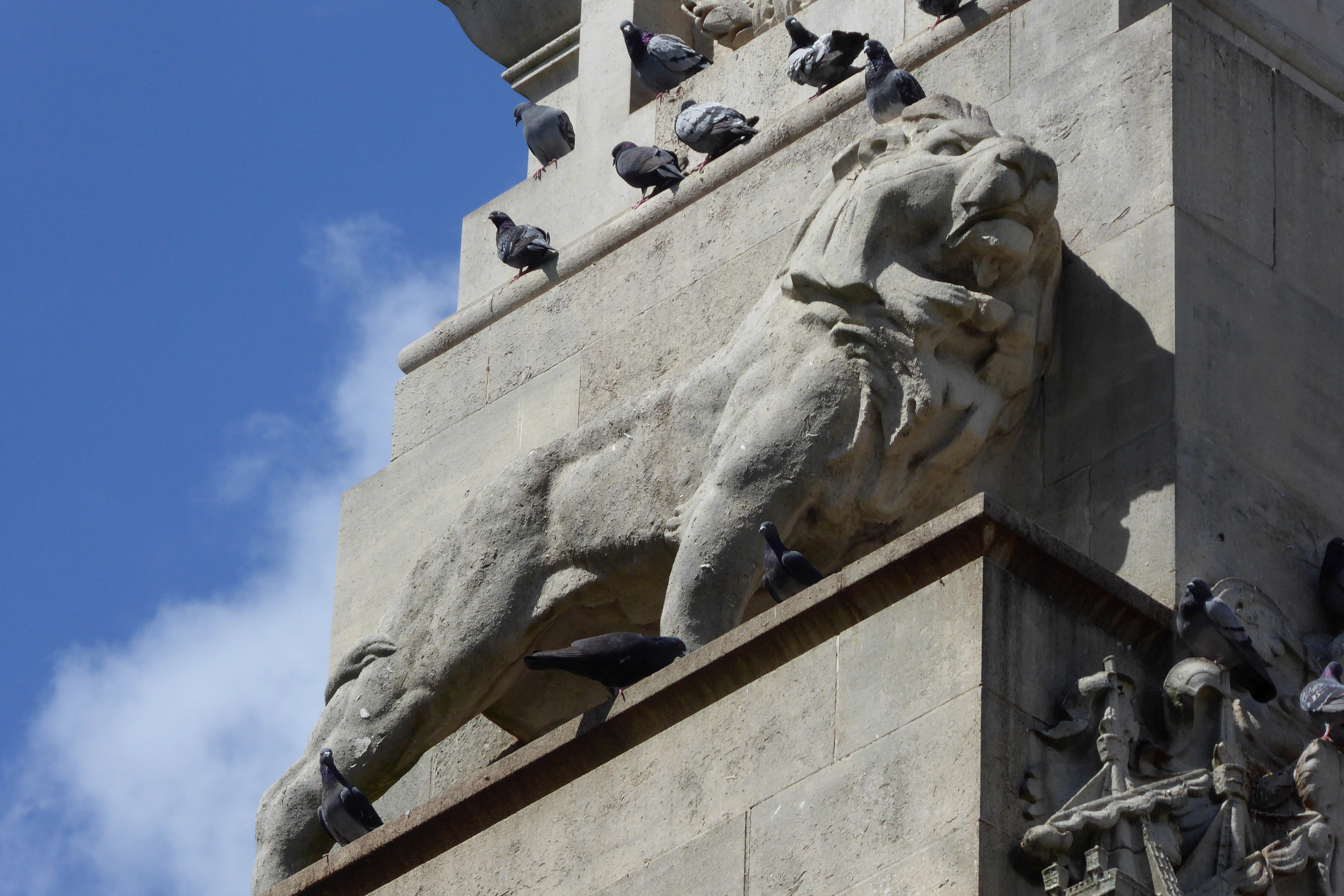
Sculpted lion on the southern face of the Southampton Cenotaph

Shortly after the signing of the Armistice in November 1918, a public meeting was held in the city of Southampton at which it was resolved to construct a memorial to honour the city's war dead. A committee, headed by the Lord Mayor of Southampton, Sidney Kimber, was elected and discussions began as to what form such a memorial should take. The committee decided that their preferred option would be to construct a single, high-quality memorial in a good location within Southampton and began to consider architects and locations, with a proposed budget of £10,000. Alfred Gutteridge, an architect on one of the sub-committees, knew and recommended Lutyens, who travelled to Southampton to meet Kimber, Gutteridge, and other members of the committee in January 1919.

Lutyens argued successfully against the committee's initial proposed location on Asylum Green in favour of Watts Park. His initial design featured a Stone of Remembrance (an altar-like monolith used in most IWGC cemeteries and several of Lutyens' memorials in Britain) with a substantial archway on either side, each archway supporting a recumbent figure of a soldier on a sarcophagus. This was rejected due to the likely cost and instead Lutyens suggested a single empty sarcophagus or cenotaph, supported by a plinth, on top of a pillar (pylon) with pine cones mounted on urns standing on each side. This was agreed to at a public meeting in September 1919 and detailed work on the project began. The London firm of Holloway Brothers was selected as the contractor for the memorial; the project was completed on time in 1920 at a total cost of £9,845.

== Design and symbolism ==
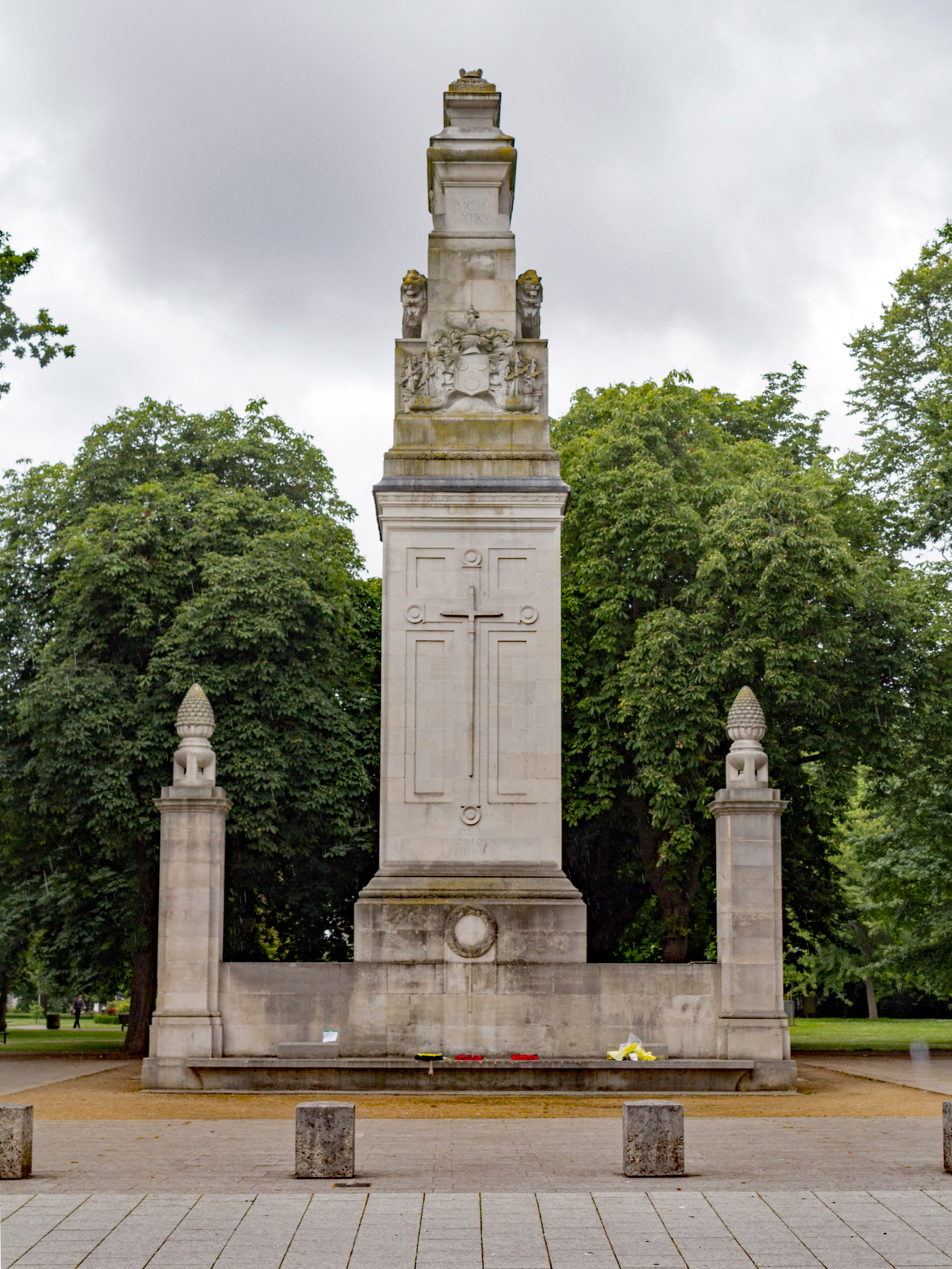
Southampton Cenotaph, viewed from Above Bar St

The memorial stands on the east side of Watts Park, alongside Above Bar Street. It consists of a cenotaph—a pylon surmounted by a sarcophagus bearing a recumbent effigy of a fallen soldier—raised on five stone steps, in front of which is a Stone of Remembrance raised on two further steps. The cenotaph is a tapering, five-tiered pillar, connected by a low wall to two flanking columns topped by sculpted pine cones, which symbolise eternal life (being the fruit of an evergreen tree, the tree of life). The thin sheets of white Portland stone on the outside of the monument hide an inner brick core.

The pillar itself culminates in a series of diminishing tiers between the main body and the sarcophagus. It contains multiple sculptural details—a cross bearing a sword is engraved on the front (east) face of the largest (second) tier, on the tier above on the front and rear is carved Southampton's coat of arms, and on the fourth tier a lion stands on each side. Finally, on the fifth tier, below the sarcophagus, are wreaths which each contain emblems, representing the British Army, the Royal Navy, the Royal Air Force, and the Merchant Navy. The pillar is slightly curved (entasis) in imitation of the pillars at the Parthenon in Athens, and a similar effect was later repeated by Lutyens at the Whitehall Cenotaph. Besides the names of the dead, the only inscription on the cenotaph reads OUR GLORIOUS DEAD; The Stone of Remembrance is inscribed THEIR NAME LIVETH FOR EVERMORE, a phrase from the Book of Ecclesiasticus chosen by Rudyard Kipling. The names of the dead are cut into recessed panels on the north, south, and west faces.

Lutyens' design predominantly draws on a cleaner, more streamlined version of the classical symbolism used in earlier monuments. He reacted to the criticism of this sometimes cluttered approach by adopting cleaner architectural forms, but still retaining the ideal of a peaceful, "beautiful death". He used shapes derived from classical architecture and with an ecumenical appeal. Southampton's cenotaph features a slender cross, a late addition at the insistence of the committee, although Lutyens was reluctant to feature overtly religious symbolism on his memorials and he resisted pressure to incorporate a cross into several of his later cenotaphs, including Whitehall. Whereas memorials from previous wars, particularly the Second Boer War, often used allegorical figures, Southampton Cenotaph makes use of an abstract, beautiful design intended to remove the viewer from the real world, and focus them on an idealised sense of self-sacrifice and death. The recumbent figure of a soldier is placed high atop the structure, anonymising him and allowing the onlooker to believe that he could be somebody they personally mourned. By placing the figure at the top of the pylon, Lutyens also draws attention to the detail at the top of the pylon, connecting the beauty of the design to the memory of the fallen soldier.

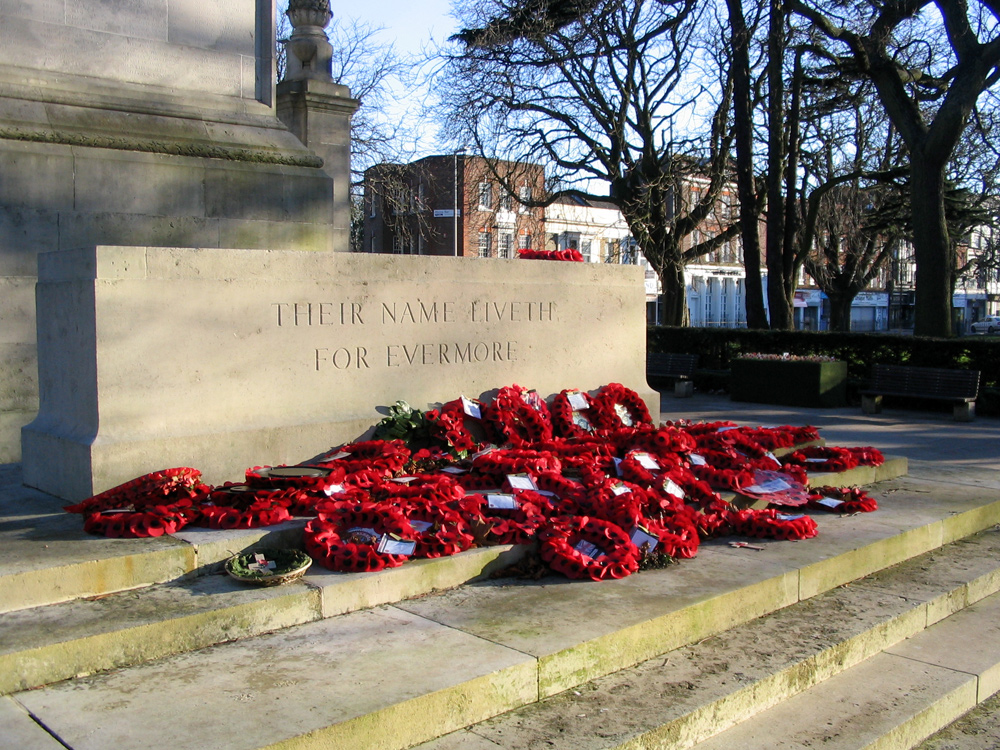
Poppy wreaths laid around the Stone of Remembrance

Southampton's is significant as the first of Lutyens' First World War memorials to be completed in permanent form. It became the first of multiple cenotaphs by Lutyens across England and the British Empire. The heavy use of sculpture contrasts sharply with Lutyens' later cenotaphs (for example Whitehall or Manchester Cenotaph), which—although of a similar shape and size—were far more austere and relied on subtler forms of expression. Additionally, the Whitehall cenotaph, and several of Lutyens' later cenotaphs, terminate in an empty coffin rather than a recumbent figure.

Lutyens reused several elements of his previous work at Southampton. He first designed the pine cones and piers (which flank the cenotaph) for a war shrine in Hyde Park in London. The war shrine was never built, but Lutyens re-used the flanking piers (without the pine cones) for the entrance to Étaples Military Cemetery in France, which he designed for the IWGC. Lutyens re-used several parts of the Southampton design, including the recumbent figure, in his proposal for the Royal Artillery Memorial in London, although that proposal was rejected by the client, who favoured a memorial with greater realism. The design that was eventually built, by sculptor Charles Sargeant Jagger, features a dead soldier directly at eye level, as though just fallen. The soldier is covered by his greatcoat, thus still anonymised, but the stark imagery contrasts sharply with Lutyens' abstract, "beautiful" portrayal of death with the soldier raised high above the ground.

The recumbent figure and the coat of arms atop the cenotaph

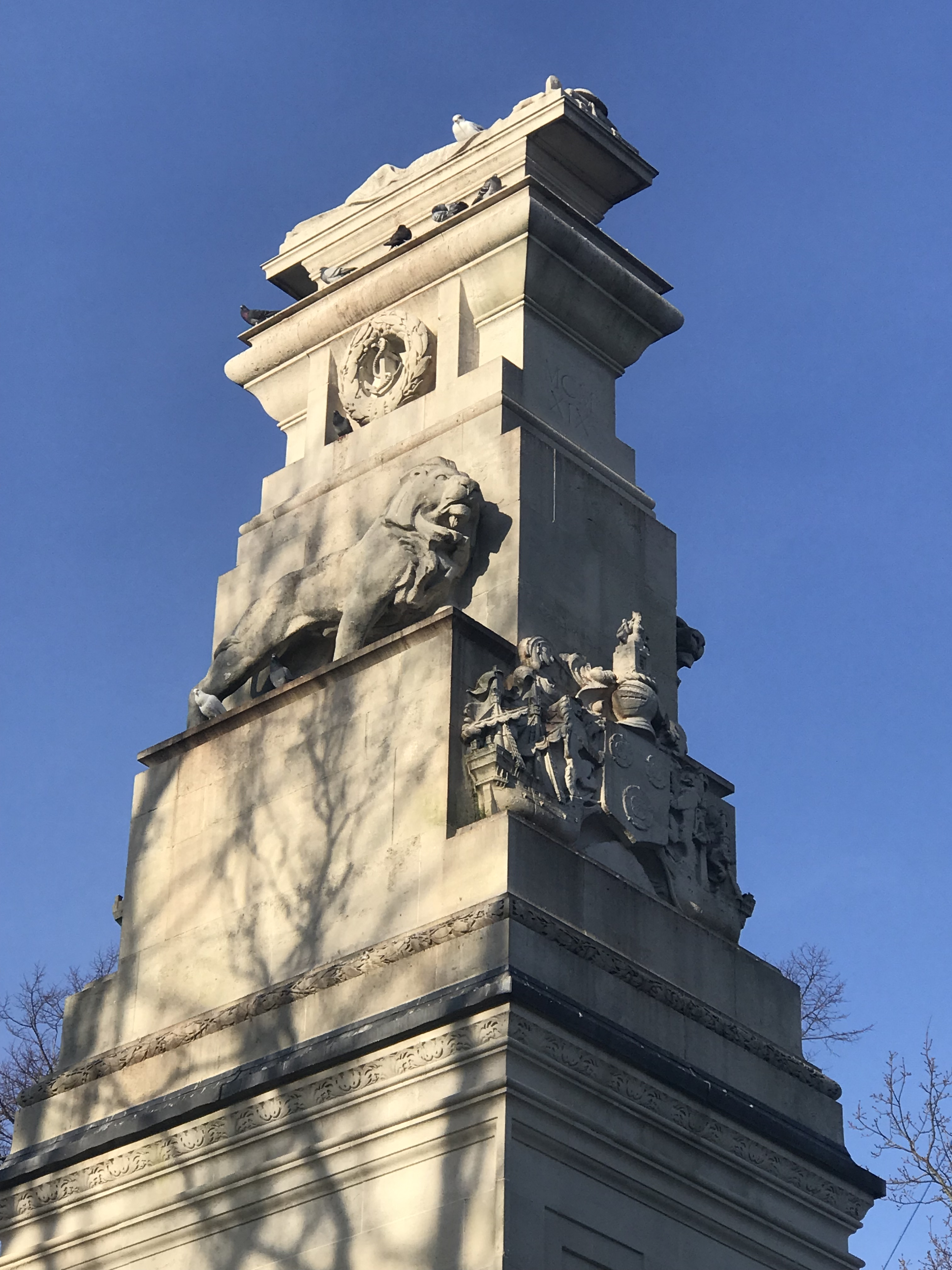

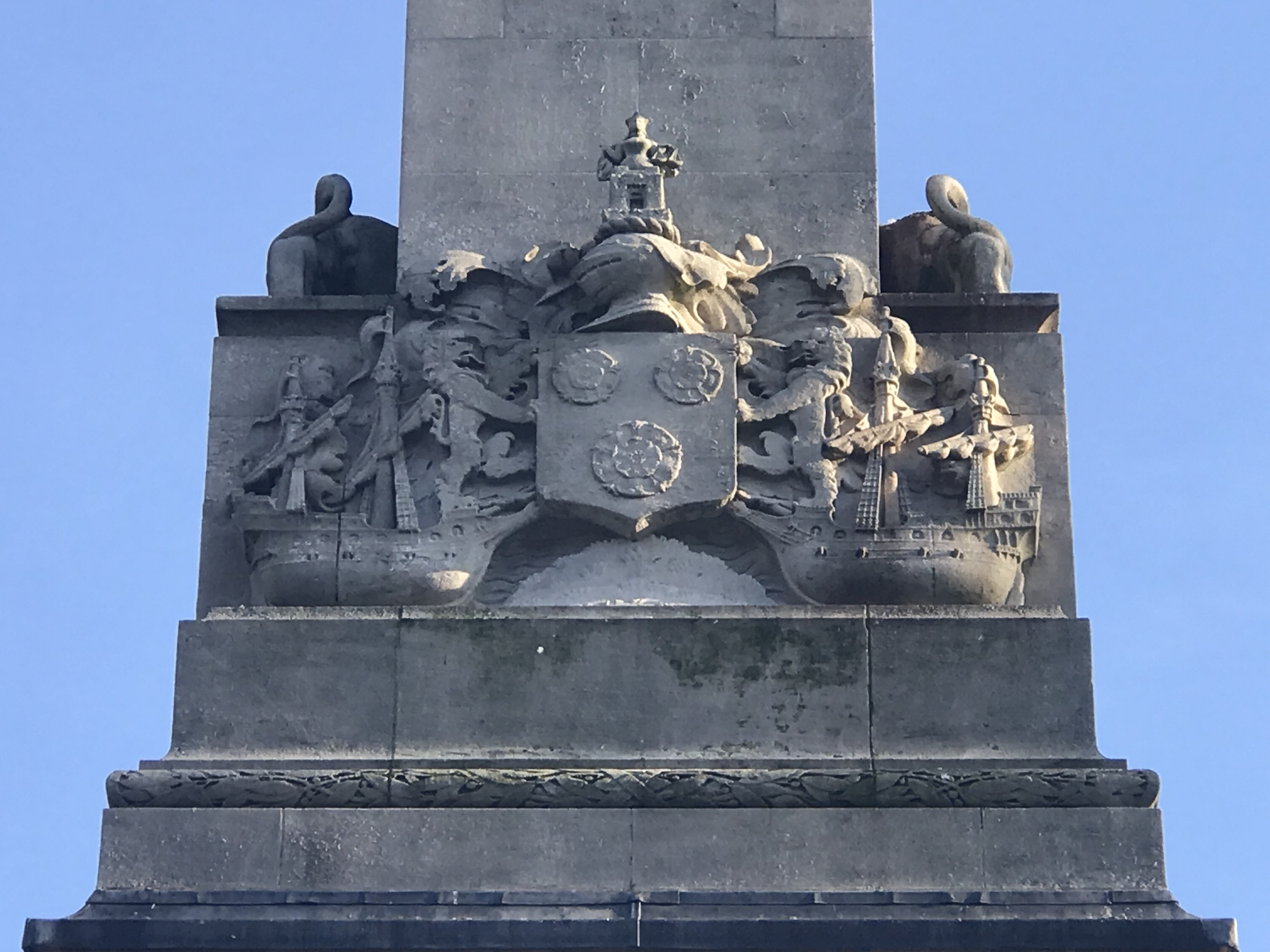

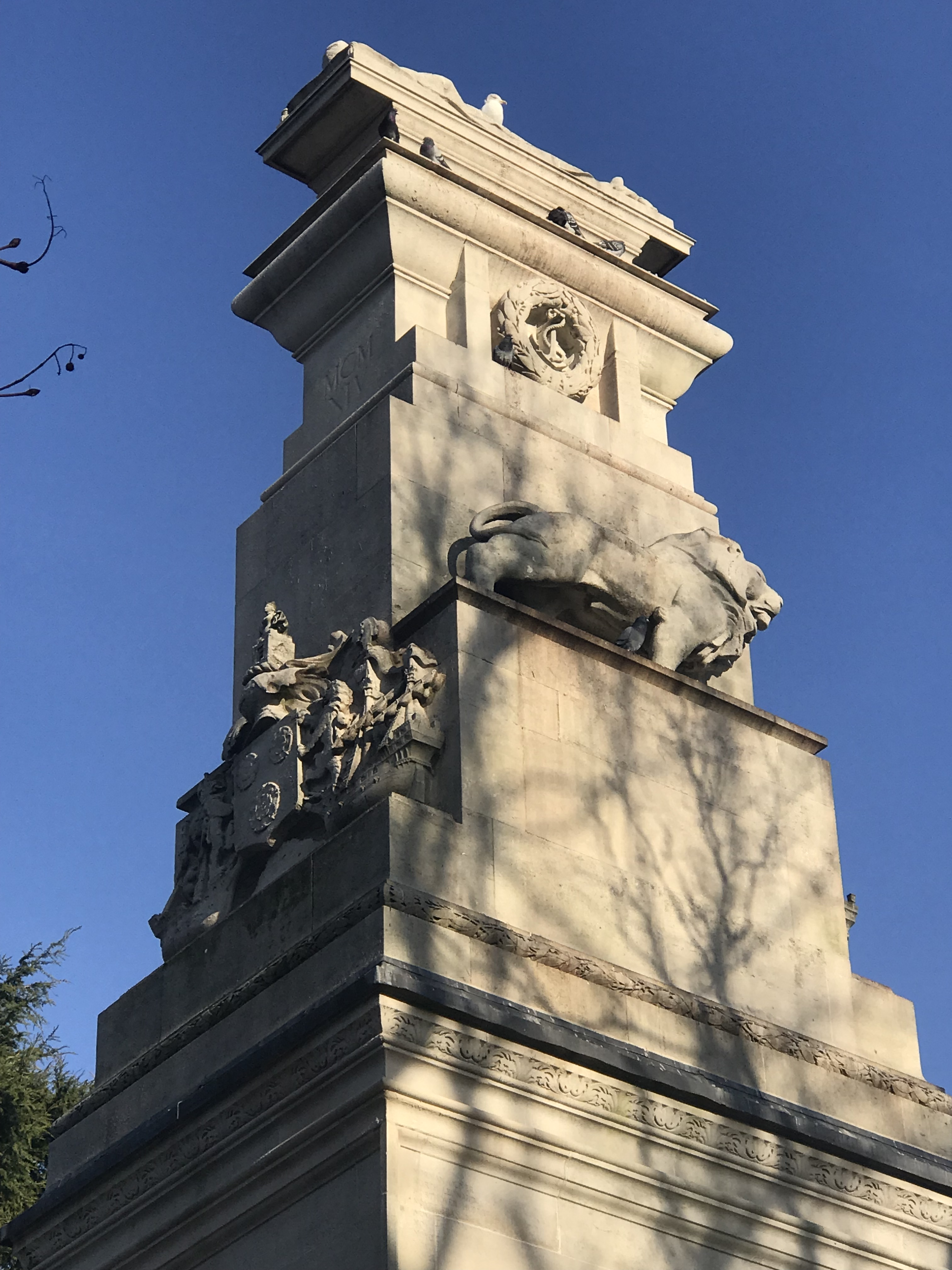

== History ==
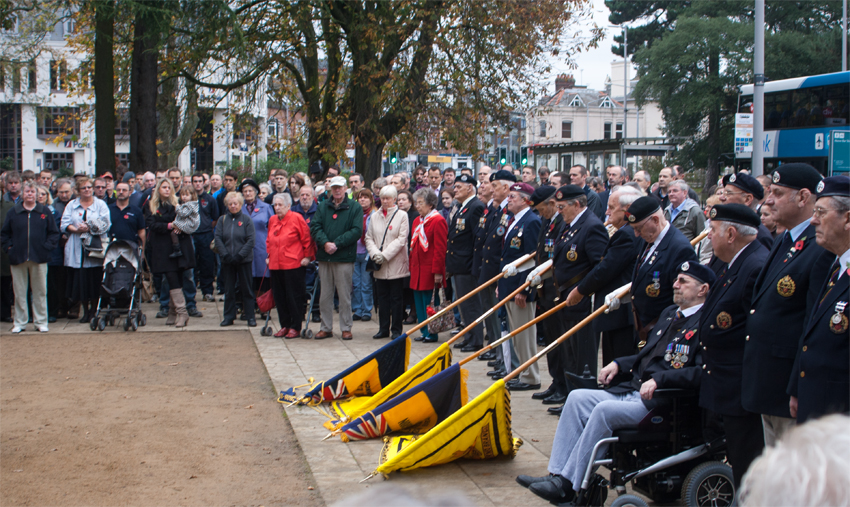
Flags lowered in salute at the Remembrance Day parade, 2011

The Cenotaph was unveiled by Major-General John Seely, the Lord Lieutenant of Hampshire, and dedicated by the Right Reverend Edward Talbot, Bishop of Winchester, at a public ceremony on 6 November 1920. Seely first removed a canvas covering the whole structure and then a Union Flag which covered the effigy of the soldier, after which the Last Post was played and the crowd observed a two-minute silence. The crowd recited the Lord's Prayer then sang the national anthem, God Save the King, after which Kimber handed the memorial over to the town council. Kimber was very pleased with both the project and Lutyens, and he hoped to build a second war memorial in Southampton using the architect—Lutyens even offered to design a War Cross free of charge—though the project never came to fruition. The committee was left with a surplus of just over £100 once it wound up, which it donated towards the Hampshire, Isle of Wight and Winchester War Memorial at Winchester Cathedral.

Issues arose shortly after the unveiling concerning the names inscribed on the memorial. The committee had identified 1,793 names of Southampton men, and a number of women, who had died during the war and these had been inscribed on the Cenotaph. After the unveiling of the monument, multiple relatives approached the committee to request that additional names be added, only to be told that this was not possible. The Hampshire branch of the Comrades of the Great War took up the case and wrote to the Southern Daily Echo newspaper, appealing for families to come forward with more names of unlisted casualties. Kimber eventually agreed and 203 additional names were inscribed in November 1921. Another name was added in 1922, bringing the total to 1,997.

More controversy surrounded the exclusion of the Jewish war dead from the memorial. Jews in Southampton had donated to the committee on the understanding that the memorial would commemorate not only Christian casualties but Jewish ones as well: one in ten adult male Jews in Southampton died during the conflict, twice the proportion for Southampton as a whole. The final decision on the design of the Cenotaph, however, featured a prominent Christian cross. This upset the Jewish community, and ultimately Jewish names were predominantly excluded from the memorial; only one Jewish name was finally inscribed on it. (Note: Lutyens was more successful in arguing against the use of overtly Christian symbols on other memorials, particularly at the war cemeteries in France and Belgium. "All that is done of structure should be for all time and for equality of honour, for besides Christians of all denominations, there will be Jews, Mussulmens, Hindus and men of other creeds, their glorious names and their mortal bodies all equally deserving enduring record and seemly sepulture.")

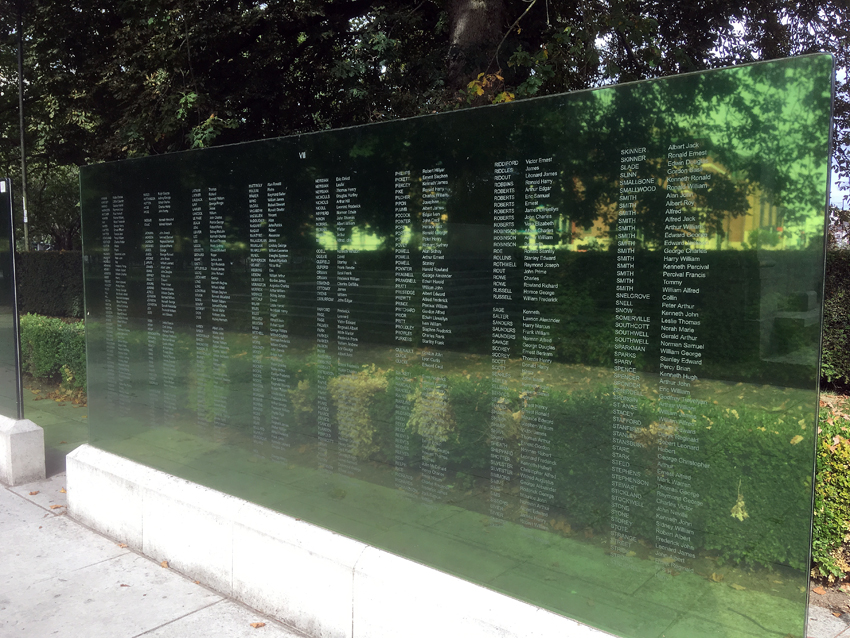
Glass panels inscribed with the names of the dead

By the start of the 21st century, it became evident that the soft stone of the Cenotaph was deteriorating badly as a result of water damage and frost. Recutting the names on the monument was discounted due to the long-term damage this repeated work would cause to the Cenotaph's structure. The council, supported by the Royal British Legion, decided instead to expand the war memorial. A memorial wall, designed by Martin Donlin, consisting of eight large glass panels, 2.85 m (9 ft 4 in) by 1.2 m (3 ft 11 in) mounted in blocks of Portland stone, was installed, with four panels on each side of the Cenotaph, at a cost of £130,000, which was met by the city council and through public donations. The panels were engraved with the names of the World War I casualties and, in addition, those from Southampton who had died in later conflicts. The opportunity was taken to add names missing from the original monument so the Memorial Wall included a total of 2,368 names from the First World War as well as 927 from the Second World War and four from later conflicts—two from the Malayan Emergency (1948–1960), and one each from the Korean War (1950–1953) and the Mau Mau Uprising (1952–1960). This addition to the Cenotaph was unveiled on 11 November 2011.

Two additional stones were later added to the west of the Stone of Remembrance; one commemorates Southampton civilians who were killed in the Second World War and the other is dedicated to all service personnel from Southampton who died in the line of duty. Another stone was laid by the Cenotaph in 2018, dedicated to Southampton-born Major-General Daniel Marcus William Beak, VC, DSO, MC, who fought in and survived the First World War, and was awarded the Victoria Cross.

A small metal plaque mounted on a concrete plinth was installed by Southampton City Council on 28 October 2006 to commemorate members of the International Brigades, communist paramilitaries who fought for the Spanish republican government against the rebelling nationalists (who were supported by Nazi Germany) in the Spanish Civil War (1936–1939). It stands in a flower bed to the north-east of the cenotaph and lists the names of four casualties, along with a dedication.

Southampton Cenotaph was designated a Grade II* listed building in 1981. Listing provides legal protection from demolition or modification; Grade II* is applied to "particularly important buildings of more than special interest" and applied to about 5.5% of listings. It was upgraded to Grade I (the highest grade, reserved for buildings of "exceptional interest" and applied to only 2.5% of listings) in November 2015, when Historic England formed a national collection of Lutyens' 44 war memorials.

== See also ==
- Rochdale Cenotaph, another Lutyens memorial similar in design to Southampton's
- Grade I listed buildings in Hampshire
- Grade I listed war memorials in England
- Listed buildings in Southampton
