= Southampton Central Parks =

Public parks in Southampton, England

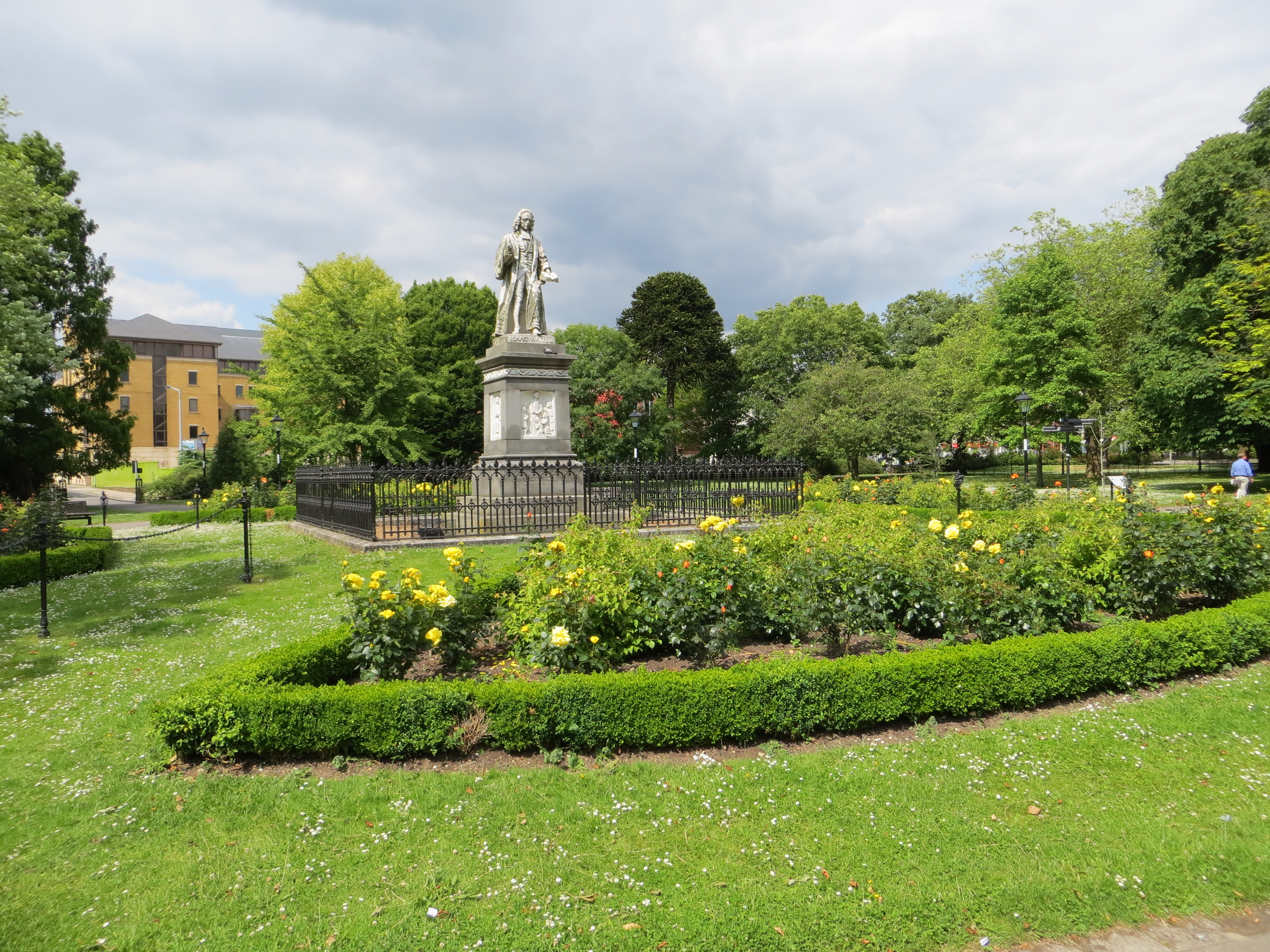
- Statue of Isaac Watts in West Park

- Location within Southampton
- Type: Public park
- Location: Southampton, Hampshire, England
- Coordinates: 50°54′25″N 1°24′10″W
- Area: 21 ha (52 acres)
- Created: 1854-1866
- Operator: Southampton City Council
- Status: Open year-round
- Awards: Green Flag Award
- Website: Official website

National Register of Historic Parks and Gardens
- Official name: Central Parks, Southampton
- Designated: 9 February 1995
- Reference no.: 1001323

The Southampton Central Parks are a set of five parks, which collectively make a central public park, in the heart of the city of Southampton. Created between 1854 and 1866, they have gained Grade II* listed status, as well as being part of the National Register of Historic Parks and Gardens. The parks are legally Common Land.

== History ==
The land on which the parks now lie can trace their formation back to the medieval period, in which the lands surrounded the developing town of Southampton. As a result, they were used as open fields, where locals had Lammas rights - which allowed burgesses (locals of the town) the right to pasture after the harvest. This was usually between August and April. This resulted in the land having many paths crossing it, which form the basis of the paths through the park now. The Southampton Marsh Act 1844 then gave the local authority the power to acquire and then build on the area, as well as Southampton Common. However, public protest led the council to protect 50 acres of this land. Throughout the 1840s, Lammas rights were slowly purchased, allowing development of the park to start. This development was protracted, hence why the parks gradually opened from 1854 to 1866.

West Park and East Park (including the area on which the Civic Centre has been built) were the West and East Magdalens (also known as the Marlands), lands granted for the maintenance of the leprosy hospital of St Mary Magdalene.

Houndwell Park and Palmerston Park both made up the area known as Houndwell Field. The field is named for the stream that arises near the junction of where Pound Tree Road and Sussex Road in now located. The western edge of Hoglands formed the eastern boundary, and a fragment of a boundary bank still survives. The establishment of a new boundary occurred when the southern portion of Palmerston Road was constructed in the middle of the 18th century, alongside the Salisbury and Southampton Canal.

== East Park ==
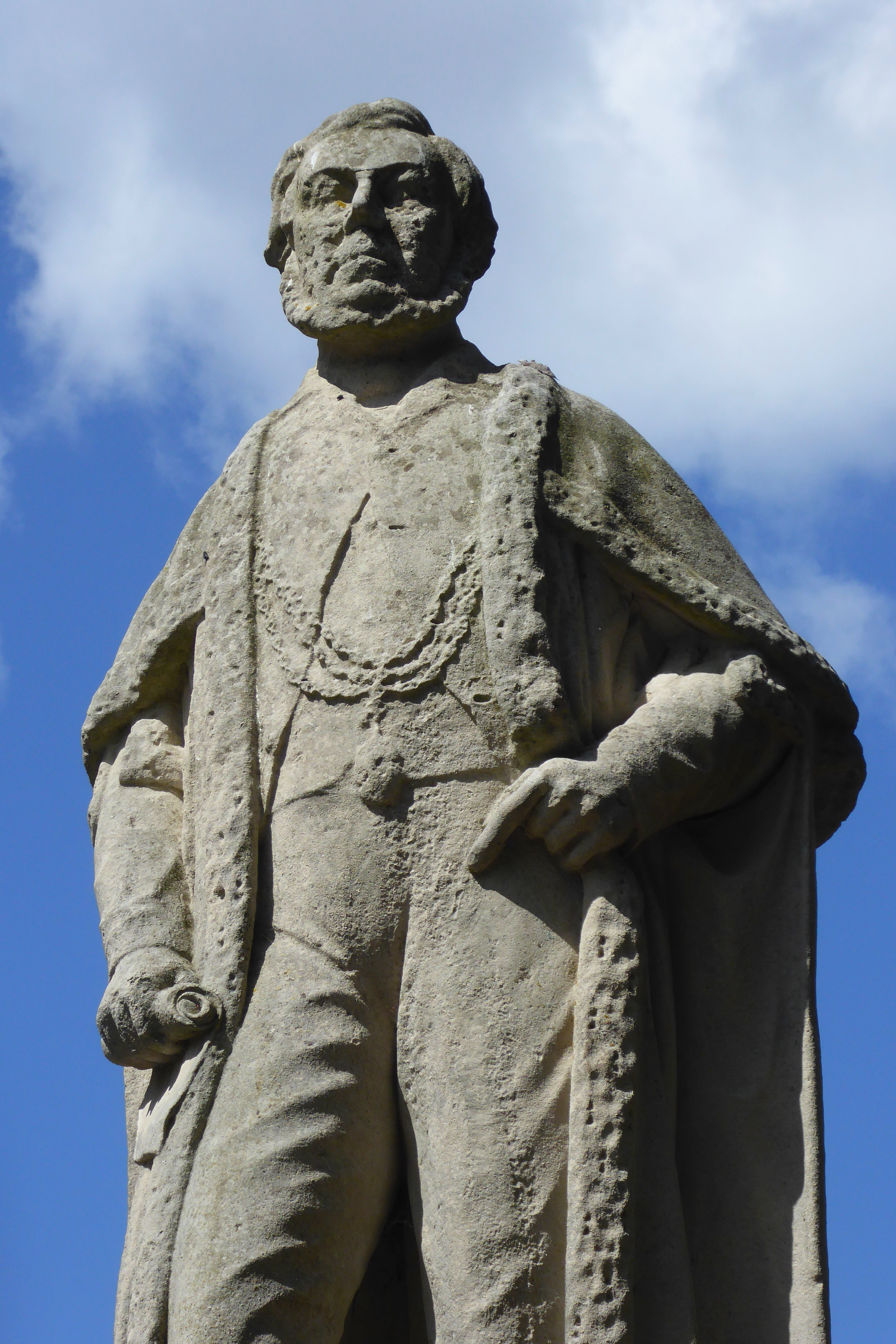
Statue of Richard Andrews in East Park

East Park, also known as Andrews Park, is the largest of all the parks. It was named after Richard Andrews, a former mayor of Southampton. Within the park, there is a statue dedicated to him due to his respected nature after his tenure as mayor. The Statue is made from Portland stone. It originally sat atop a highly decorated pedestal made of bath stone. This weathered poorly and was replaced with a simpler one in 1971. This was in turn replaced with a taller but still plain pedestal in 2002. Since 1902 the park has been home to a sundial erected to mark the coronation of Edward VII. It is made from Portland Stone.

The park also has the Titanic Engineers' Memorial, dedicated to those who died when the Titanic sank. Finally, there is the Queens Peace Fountain. This was built in 2000, on the site of a previous fountain. It was built to commemorate Elizabeth II as well as '56 years of Peace'.

== Hoglands Park ==
Hoglands Park is the park that usually holds sports events, as well as festivals, circus' and fairgrounds. This is due to it being a more open space than the other parks. It also has a skate park and a pavilion 'decorated by local artists'.

The earliest recorded name for the area Hoggesland dates to 1273 with the name later being known as 'Hogsland'. The area was made a park in 1844. Prior to that point the area had been leased by the then town for farming.

During World War II the park was used as a site for air raid shelters one of which took a direct hit which killed 16 people. Later it saw use as a base by American military police. The American 14th Major Port was also based there and for a period after the war its huts were used for housing. In 1926 the Borough of Southampton added a cricket scoring box to the park. It was a square building with two stories the upper of which was accessed by a ladder.

=== Speakers Pedestal ===
Within the park is Southampton's Speakers' Corner, consisting of steps with a guard rail. It was built in 1971, due to the significant increase in protesters on the recently pedestrianised High Street. As the High Street was still legally a highway, these protesters were arrested, charged and found guilty. To mitigate issues surrounding free speech, the council agreed to construct a speaker's corner in one of the parks, out the way of the shops on the High Street. It was first used on 27 November 1971 by an anti-apartheid group. It is rarely used now, with most protesters using the Guildhall Square.

== Houndwell Park ==
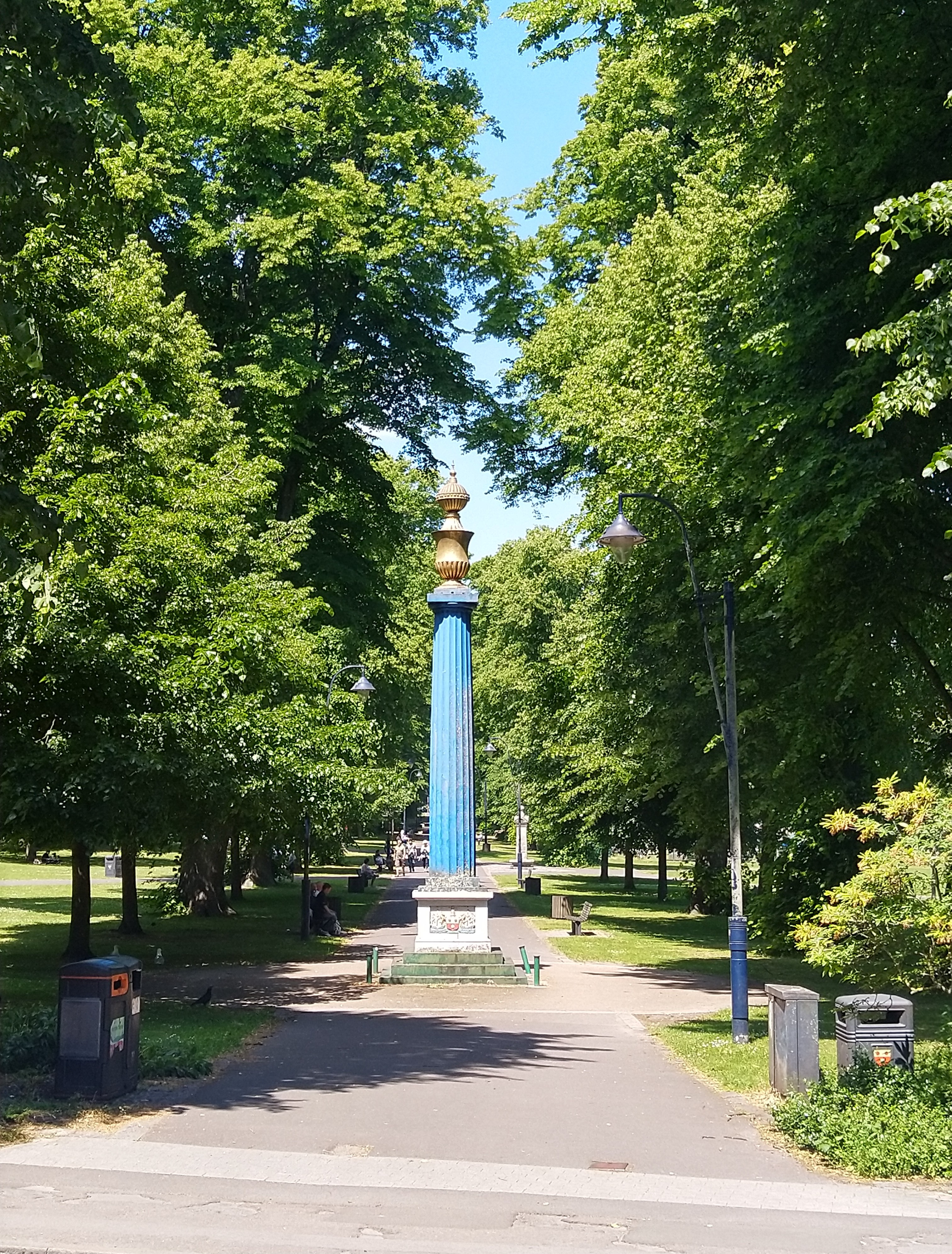
Gas Column in Houndwell Park

Houndwell Park's main attraction is its large playground, the only one in any of the central parks. This playground gets frequent upgrades due to it being well used by locals. The park also houses the memorial to William Chamberlayne, the MP for Southampton between 1818 and 1829. This memorial is called the 'Gas Column', with it standing 50 ft high. It was moved to Houndwell park in 1865. The name may be derived from the nearby Houndwell spring.

There is evidence for roman and Saxon era activity on the site of the park. A Romano-British kiln was located in the south-west part of Hound-well Park. In the 1790s part of the Salisbury and Southampton Canal was built across the land that would become the park.

The area was made a park in 1844. Prior to that point the area had been leased by the then town for farming. The canal was filled in over approximately 5 years from 1846 onwards.

=== Water Fountain ===
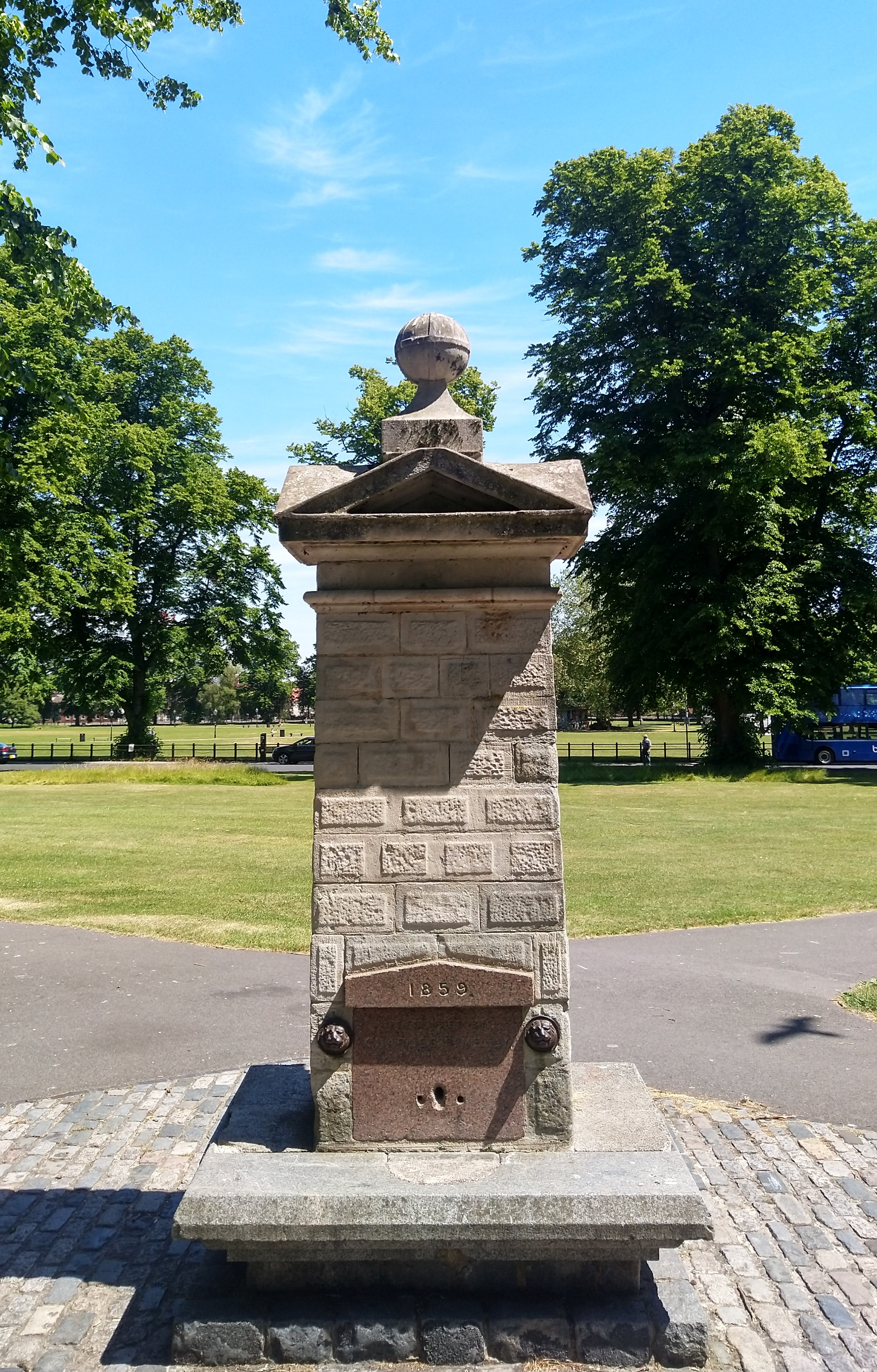
Houndwell Park fountain

In the 1850s Edmund Kell, a local councillor wanted a water fountain to be built in Southampton, with the hope to reduce drunkenness. In 1859, Charles Melly, a philanthropist who encouraged the creation of public drinking fountains, sent a letter to the Southampton corporation, saying he would pay for the fountain. Later that year, it was unveiled on East Street. In 1969, it was moved to its current place in the park - with it no longer being connected to a water supply.

== Palmerston Park ==
Palmerston Park is named after Lord Palmerston, Prime Minister of the UK in the 19th century. Prior to the erection of the statue it was known as Fair Field. There is a 7 ft statue made of Carrara marble dedicated to him, erected four years after his death in 1869. The park also has a bandstand, which was replaced in 1999. The original bandstand from 1885 was removed in 1940 due to bomb damage, as a result of WW2.

== West Park ==
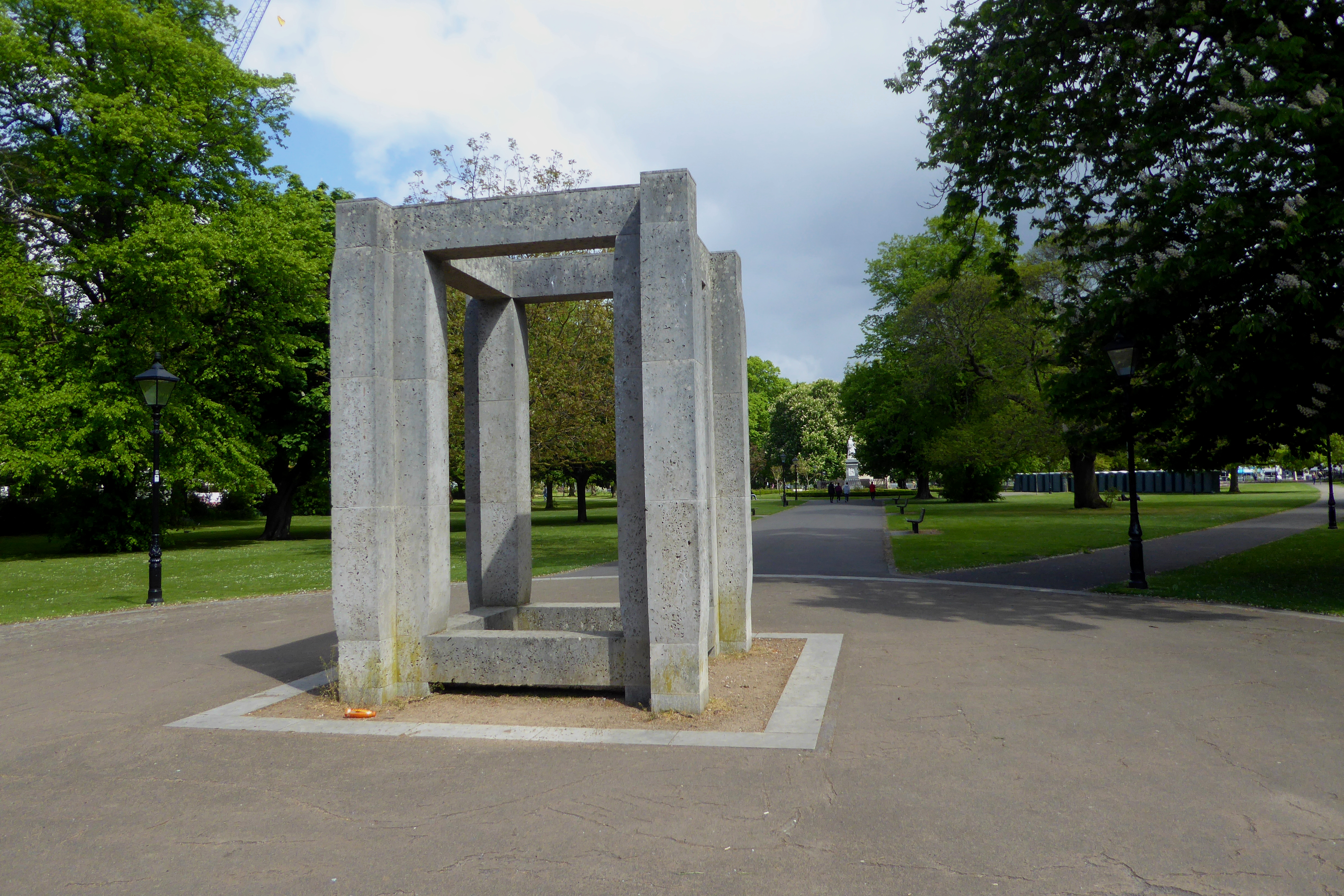
Paul de Monchaux's sculpture, "Enclosure", in Watts Park

West Park, also known as Watts Park, is the western most park. It is named after Isaac Watts, with a statue of him being located in the centre of the Park. The statue faces the Southampton Civic Centre, with the Clock Tower playing his ‘Our God, Our Help in Ages Past’ at 8:00, 12:00 and 16:00 daily. The park also houses the Southampton Cenotaph, which was the model for the Whitehall Cenotaph in London. The statue was placed there in 1861 and is made from Carrara marble, it sits upon a rubislaw granite plinth. In 1985 The inscription on the structure was recut.

=== Enclosure sculpture ===
In 2001, the sculpture ‘Enclosure’ by Paul de Monchaux was added to the park. The four metre high stone sculpture frames three skyline landmarks in and around the park. These framed structures are named on the base of the sculpture, with it framing the Cenotaph (though this is blocked by the Issac Watts statue), the Southampton Civic Centre clock tower and the Spire on what was formerly St Peters Church, opposite the Mayflower Theatre. It was paid for by the Lottery Fund.

== Lime Tree Avenue ==
The Lime Tree Avenue runs in a straight line through the parks. It starts at Houndwell Park (at the Gas Column) and runs north through Palmerston Park to East (Andrews) Park, where it stops at the Queens Peace Fountain. The avenue of trees were presented in 1862, by then Mayor of Southampton, Sir Frederick Perkins. This is commemorated by a plaque adjacent to the statue of Richard Andrews.

== Notes ==
1.The information regarding the Queens Peace Fountain is from signage within the park, at its entrance opposite the Cenotaph.
