= Titanic Engineers' Memorial =

Memorial in Southampton, England

Coordinates: 50.91018°N 1.40469°W

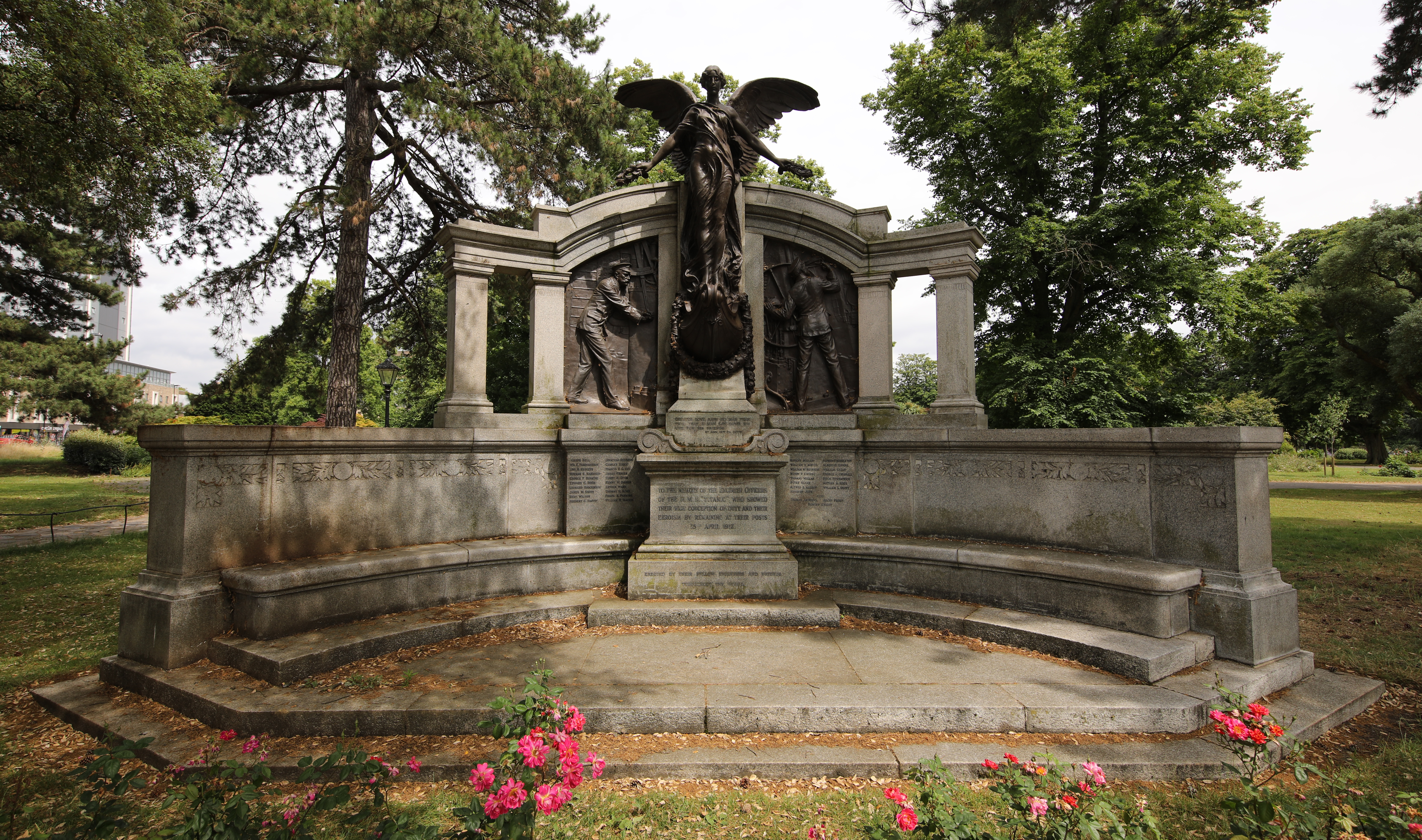
The memorial to the engineers of the RMS Titanic

The Titanic Engineers' Memorial is a memorial in East (Andrews) Park, Southampton, United Kingdom, to the engineers who died in the Titanic disaster on 15 April 1912. The bronze and granite memorial was originally unveiled by Sir Archibald Denny, president of the Institute of Marine Engineers on 22 April 1914. The event was attended by an estimated 100,000 Southampton residents.

== History ==
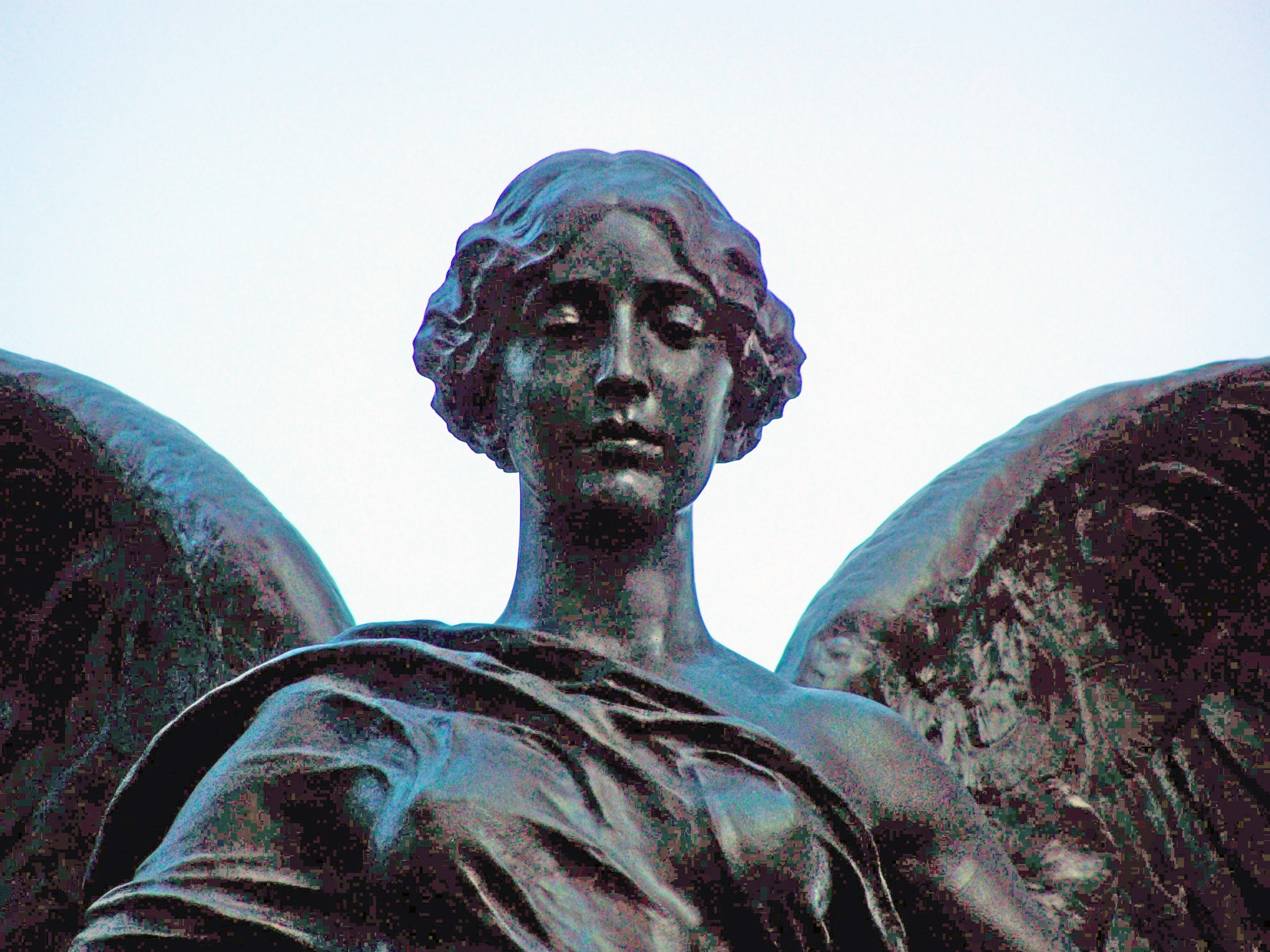
Goddess Nike

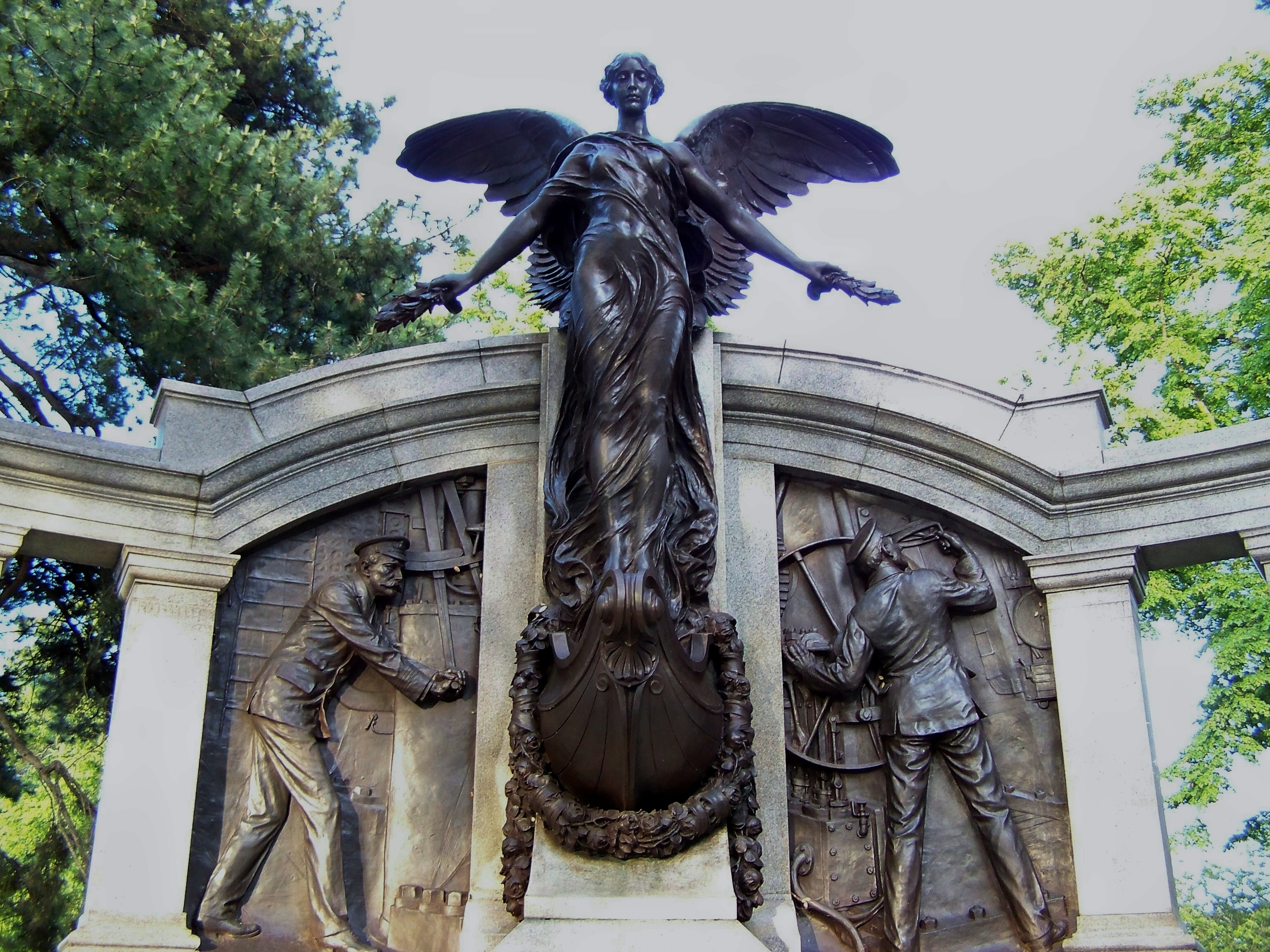
Statue of the goddess Nike and carvings representing the engineer officers (2011)

Joseph Bell was the Chief Engineer Officer on the RMS Titanic. His staff consisted of 24 engineers, 6 electrical engineers, two boilermakers, a plumber and a clerk. None survived the sinking.

The monument was originally erected with funding from worldwide donations. It was designed and built by Whitehead and Son of the Imperial Works, Kennington Oval in London. Ferdinand Victor Blundstone was the sculptor. It is officially a Grade II listed building. It features a bronze statue of Nike, the Greek Winged Goddess of Victory, created by Trieste-born sculptor Romeo Rathmann, and carvings which represent the engineer officers of the ship, who died in the disaster. The stone of the monument is Kemnay Granite.

On a sunny afternoon on 22 April 1914, 100,000 people gathered in Andrews Park, Southampton to witness the unveiling of the memorial to the engineers who had died on the Titanic two years earlier. The bronze and granite structure was draped in the Union flag. Unveiling the statue, Sir Archibald Denny said:

"By the manner of their deaths [the engineers] carried out one of the finest traditions of our race."

"They must have known that pumping could do no more than delay the final catastrophe, yet they stuck pluckily to their duty."

"Driven back from boiler-room to boiler-room, fighting for every inch of draught to give time for the launching of the boats, not one of those brave officers was saved."

The monument bears the following inscription:

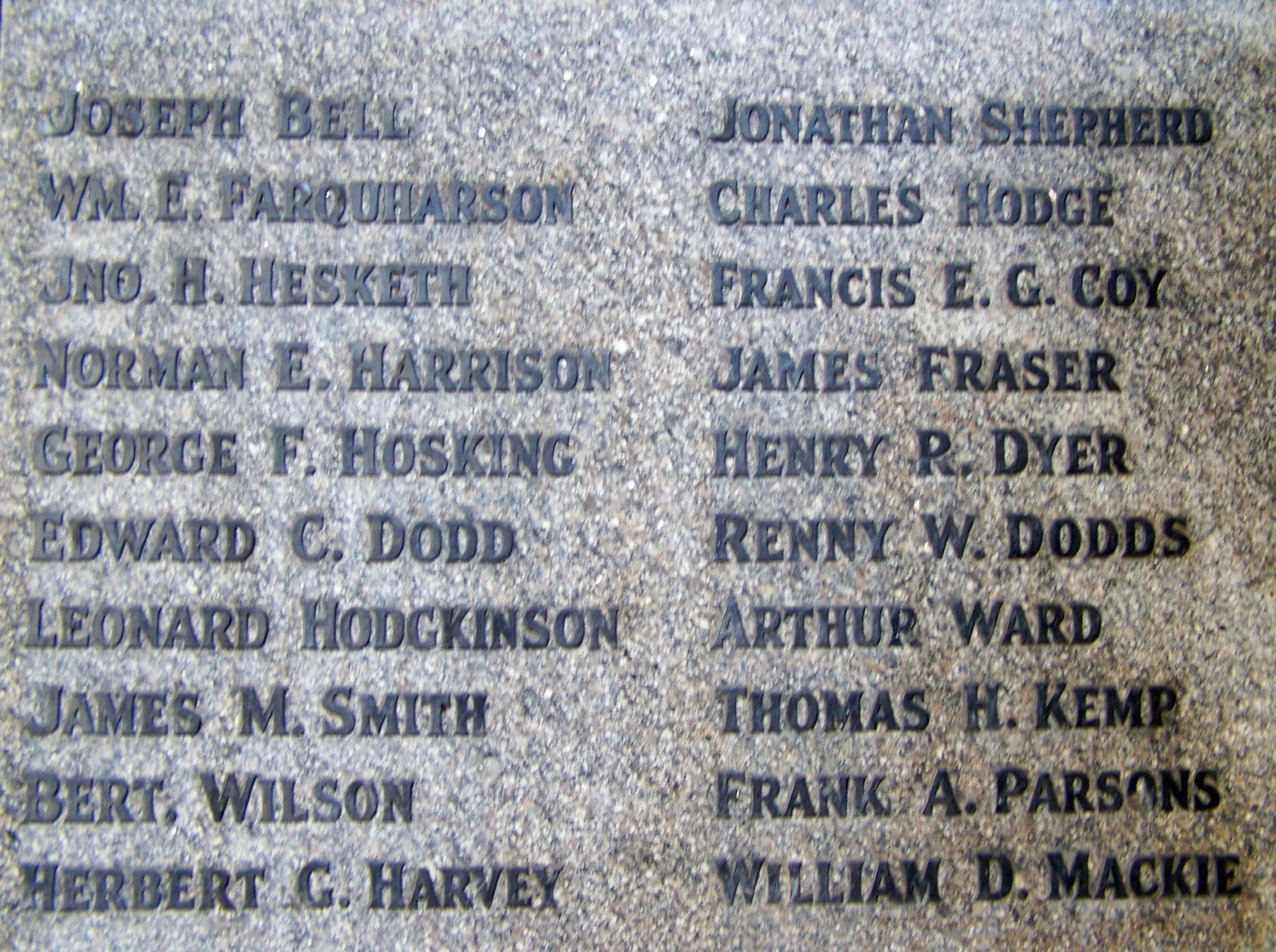
List of the 35 engineer officers who died in the

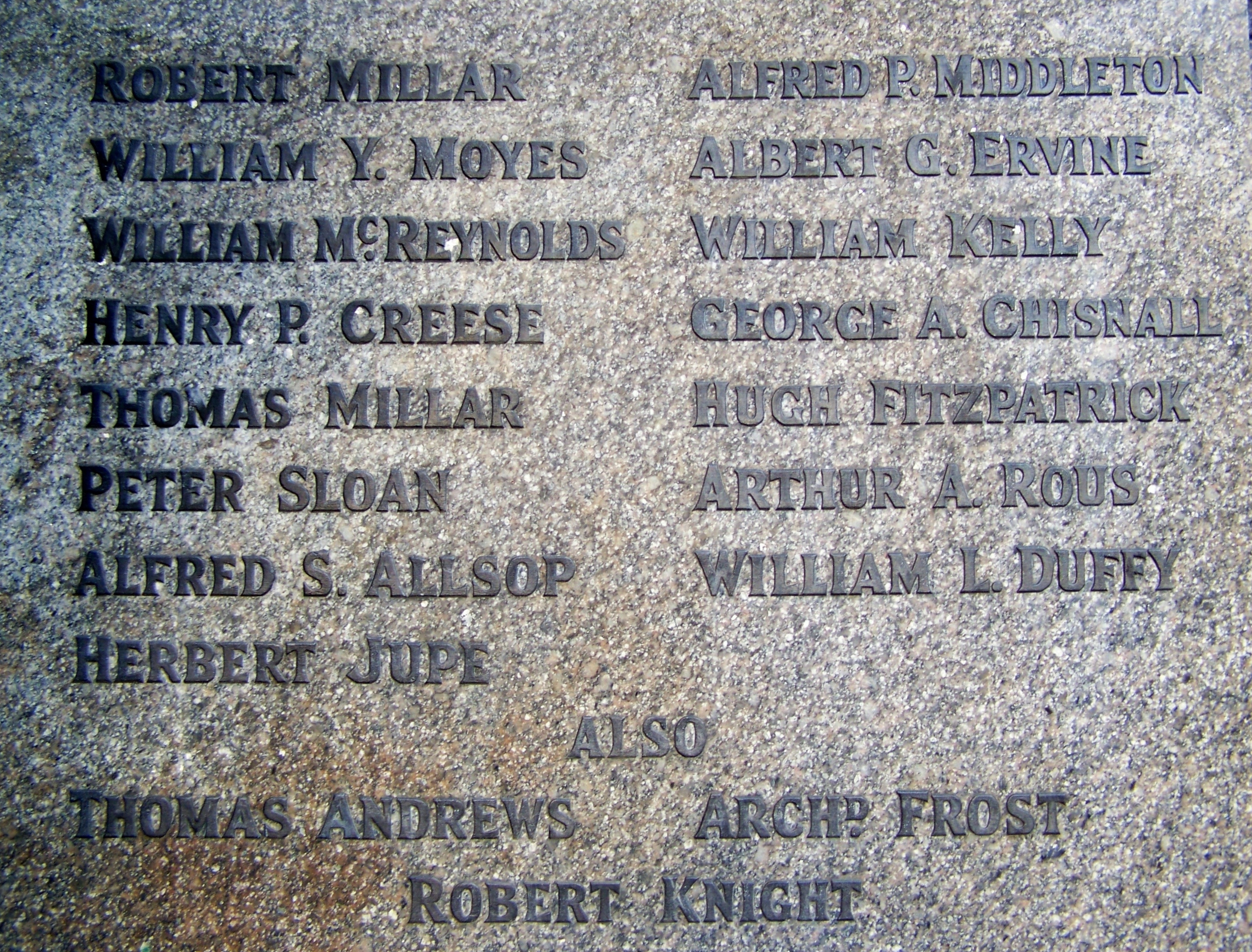
RMS Titanic disaster

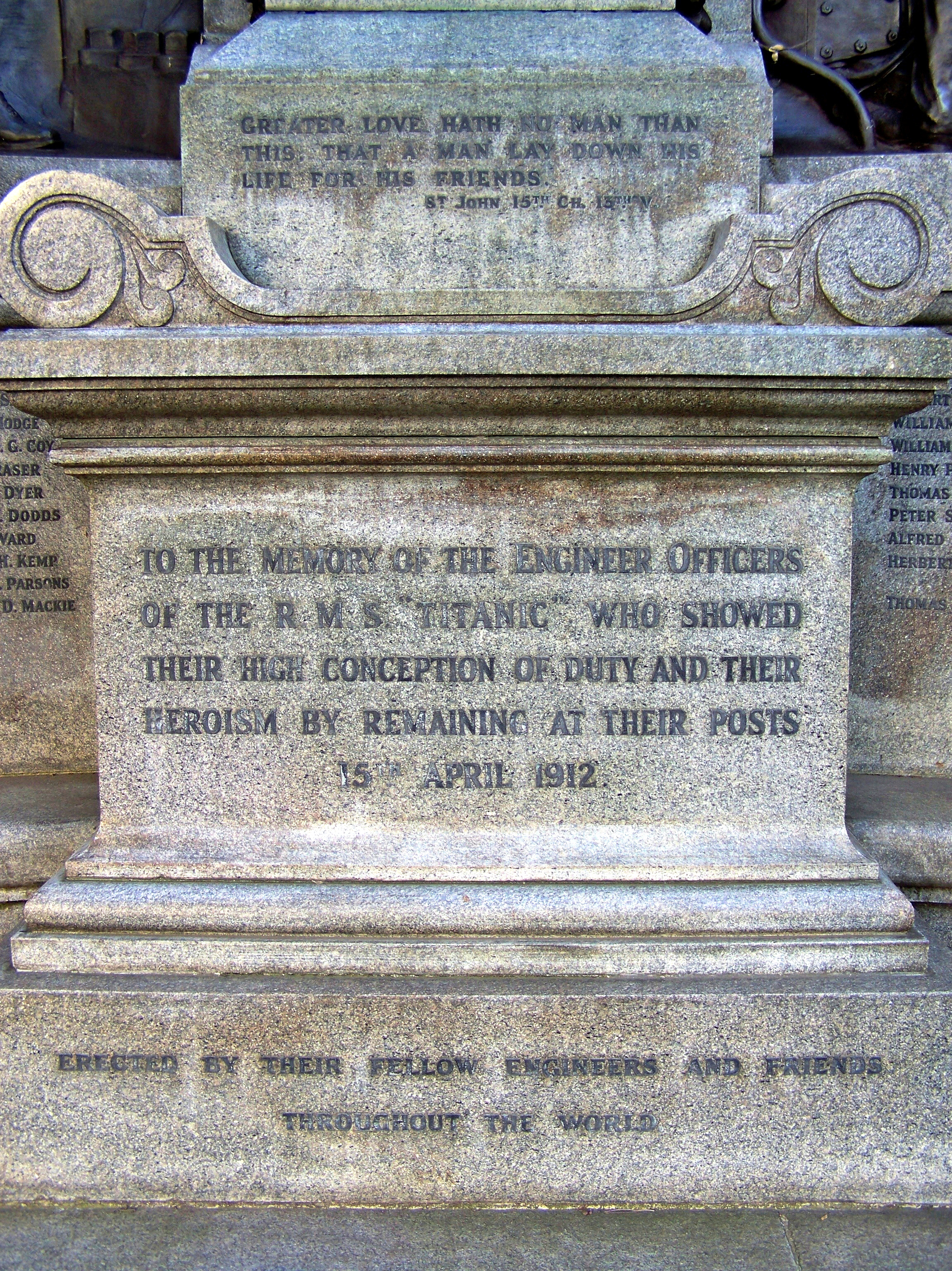
Inscription on Titanic Engineers' Memorial, Southampton

GREATER LOVE HATH NO MAN THAN

THIS. THAT A MAN LAY DOWN HIS

LIFE FOR HIS FRIENDS

ST. JOHN 15TH CH. 13TH V

TO THE MEMORY OF THE ENGINEER OFFICERS

OF THE R.M.S "TITANIC" WHO SHOWED

THEIR HIGH CONCEPTION OF DUTY AND THEIR

HEROISM BY REMAINING AT THEIR POSTS

15TH APRIL 1912.

ERECTED BY THEIR FELLOW ENGINEERS AND FRIENDS

THROUGHOUT THE WORLD

The monument was restored in 2010 in a joint venture between Southampton City Council and TV production company Twenty Twenty Television. Almost opposite the main memorial, on the corner of Cumberland Place and London Road, is the Titanic Musicians' Memorial to Wallace Hartley and the other musicians who played on the Titanic.
