= Camp Down, Portsdown Hill =

Coordinates: 50.8530°N 1.0268°W

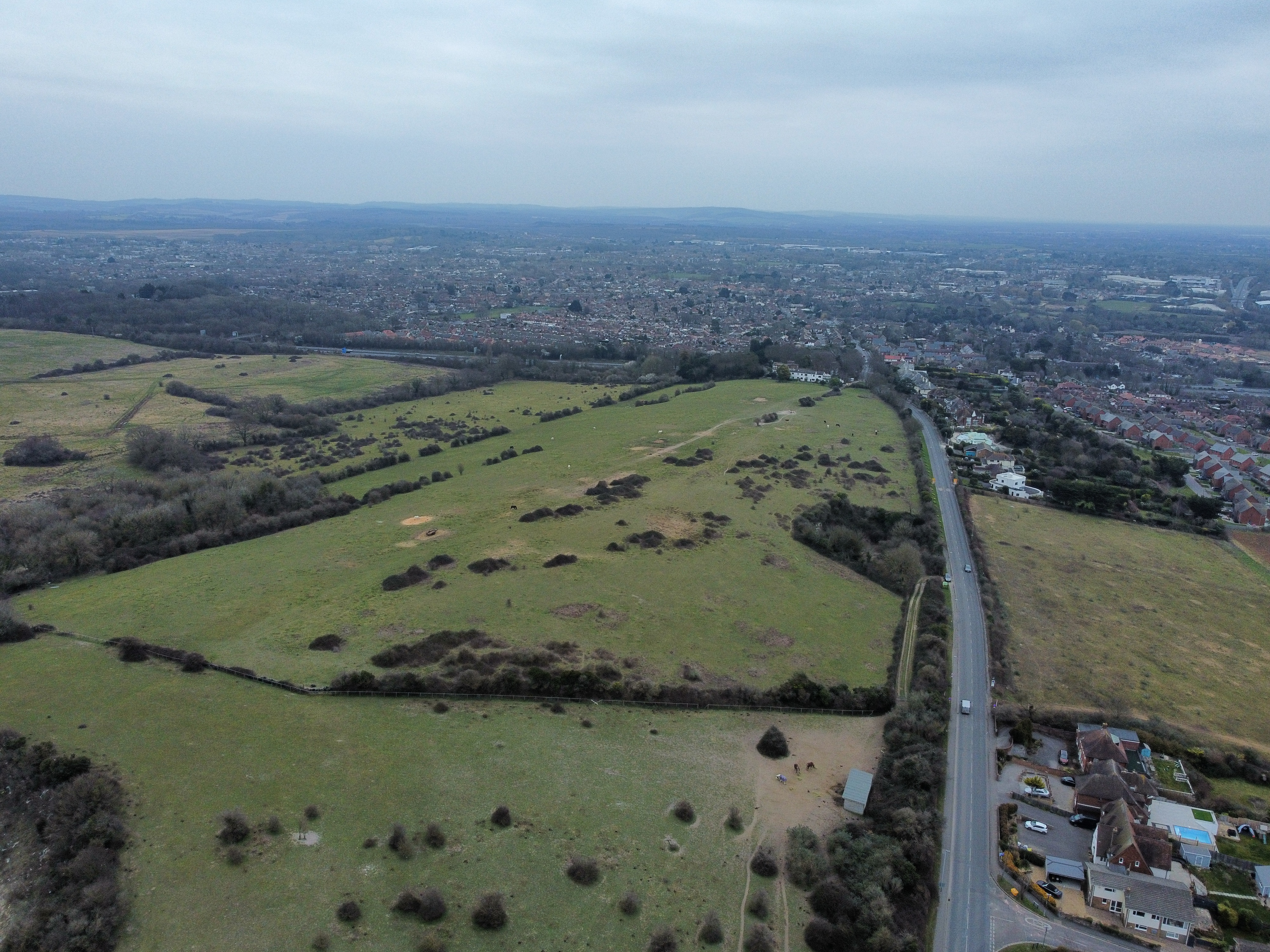
Camp Down, looking towards Bedhampton

Camp Down is a location at Portsdown Hill, Hampshire, near Farlington, which was used as an Admiralty semaphore station and later as a redoubt on the line of Palmerston Forts, Portsmouth.

The Admiralty Telegraph Station was built at Camp Down in 1821 and it operated on the semaphore line from London to Portsmouth from 1822 to 1847.

Farlington Redoubt was built on the site as a result of the 1859 Royal Commission, as part of a series of fortifications built to defend Portsmouth and its dockyard (which is 5 miles (8.0 km) away) from a possible attack from inland, as the development of rifled gun barrels made it possible for an invading army to land elsewhere, circle around to the top of the hill and bombard the city from there, rendering the existing Hilsea Lines at the bottom of the ridge useless. The redoubt formed the eastern limit of a series of 6 forts which were planned along the 7 miles (11 km) of the ridge.

The site is now quarried away.

Next station upwards	Admiralty Semaphore line 1822	Next station downwards
Compton Down, Compton	Camp Down	Lumps Fort
