= List of Palmerston Forts at Portsmouth =

Group of sea forts in England

Coordinates: 50°47′N 1°6′W

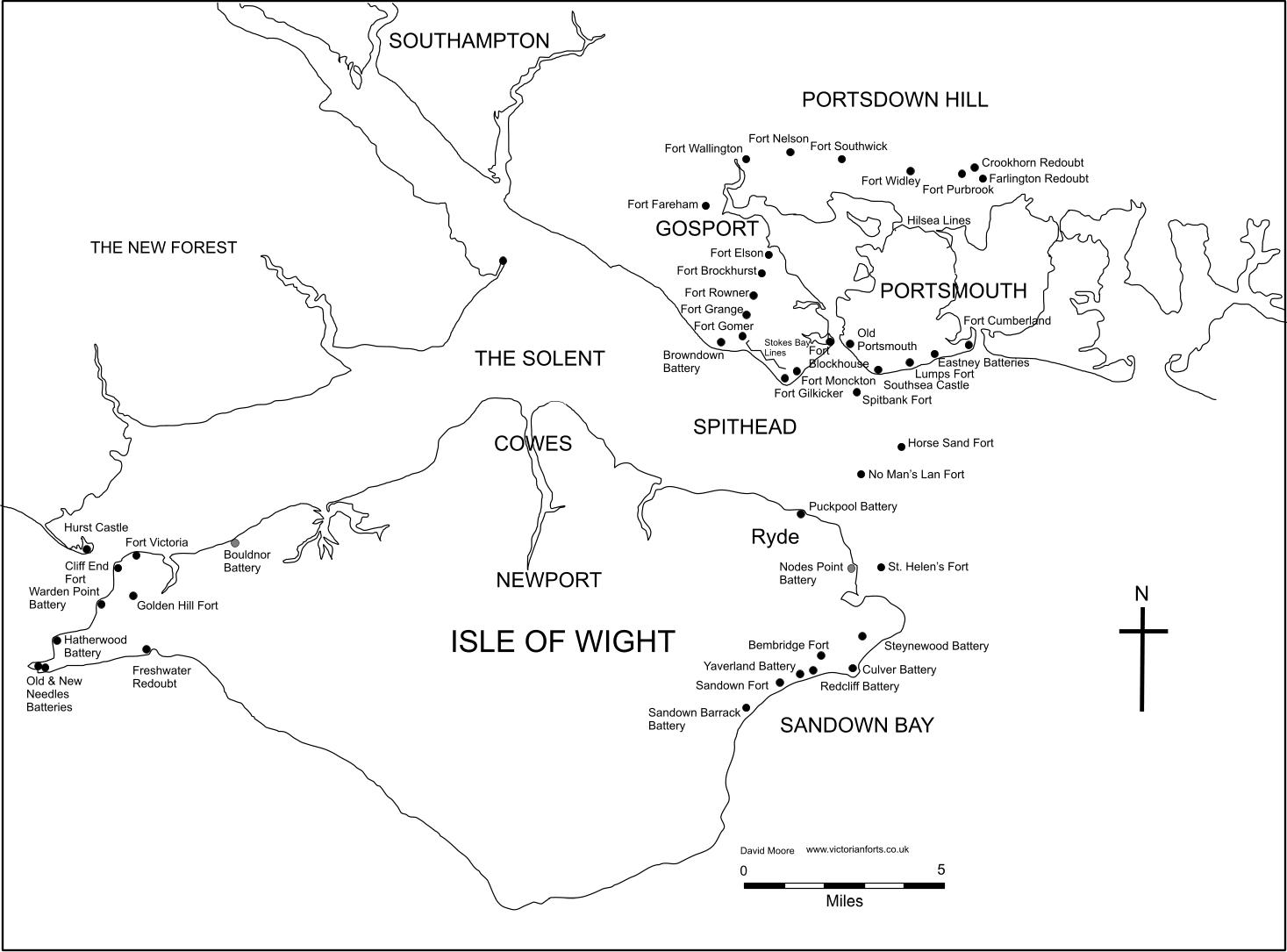
The Victorian forts of Portsmouth, including those on the Isle of Wight

The Palmerston Forts that encircle Portsmouth were built in response to the 1859 Royal Commission dealing with the perceived threat of a French invasion. The forts were intended to defend the Dockyard in Portsmouth. Construction was carried out by the Royal Engineers and civilian contractors (under Royal Engineer supervision). In addition to the newly constructed forts, extensive work was carried out on existing fortifications.

The Portsmouth defences can be split into four distinct groups of forts, comprising four sea forts built in the Solent, a group of forts on Portsea Island, a group of forts along Portsdown Hill overlooking Portsmouth, and a group of forts on the Gosport peninsula.

As well as these forts surrounding Portsmouth, further protection for Portsmouth was provided by additional Palmerston forts on the Isle of Wight.

== Solent forts ==
These man-made island forts were originally built to protect the eastern approaches to Portsmouth Harbour from attack by enemy forces. The four armour-plated forts were designed by Captain E. H. Stewart, overseen by Assistant Inspector General of Fortifications, Colonel W. F. D. Jervois. Construction took place between 1865 and 1880, at a total cost of £1,177,805. By the time the forts had been completed, the threat of invasion had long since passed and although the forts were armed and re-armed as technology advanced, they were never used in anger. They were decommissioned in 1956 and put up for sale in the 1960s, although they were not sold until the 1980s. The subsequent purchaser, in 2012, was Clarenco (previously known as Amazing Retreats), operated by Michael Clare. His plan was for two of the forts to be converted into hotels and one into a museum.

The restoration was completed for Spitbank Fort and No Man's Land Fort, both hotels at the time, but not for Horse Sand Fort; the work also excluded St Helens Fort, held by a different owner. In 2020, the three Clarence-owned forts were listed for sale.

- Spitbank Fort
- St Helens Fort
- Horse Sand Fort
- No Man's Land Fort

== Portsea Island forts ==
These forts are situated on Portsea Island, the low-lying island on which most of the city of Portsmouth is located. None of the forts were originally built as a result of the 1859 Royal Commission, but they did receive improvements because of it.

- Fort Cumberland
- Eastney Batteries
- Lumps Fort
- Southsea Castle
- Point Battery
- Hilsea Lines

== Portsdown Hill forts ==
These forts are located along Portsdown Hill overlooking Portsmouth, and were a response to advancing weapons technology. This new technology made it possible for shelling accurate over a number of miles to take place. The forts were intended to prevent a hostile force landing further along the coast, approaching Portsmouth from the mainland, taking the tactical high ground to the north of the dockyard. As such, the forts are designed so that all of their main weapons face inland, protecting Portsmouth from the rest of England.

- Fort Wallington
- Fort Nelson, Portsmouth
- Fort Southwick
- Fort Widley
- Fort Purbrook
- Crookhorn Redoubt
- Farlington Redoubt

== Gosport forts ==
These are situated on the Gosport peninsula. Again, they were built to prevent an enemy force landing along the coast and approaching Portsmouth from inland, and had their main weaponry facing away from Portsmouth.

- Fort Monckton
- Fort Gilkicker
- Stokes Bay Lines
- Browndown Battery
- Fort Fareham
- Fort Gomer
- Fort Grange
- Fort Rowner
- Fort Brockhurst
- Fort Elson

== See also ==
- Fortifications of Portsmouth
