= Siege of Portsmouth =

1643 battle of the First English Civil War

Coordinates: 50.806°N 1.087°W

- Part of the First English Civil War
Date	10 August – 7 September 1642
Location	Portsmouth, Hampshire, England
Result	Parliamentarian victory

Belligerents
Royalists	Parliamentarians

Commanders and leaders
Lord Goring	Sir William Waller; John Urry

Strength
500; 1 ship	400–800; 2+ cannons 7 ships

Casualties and losses
Unknown; 1 ship captured	Unknown

The siege of Portsmouth was the siege of a Royalist garrison in Portsmouth by a Parliamentarian force conducted in the early part of the First English Civil War. The siege resulted in Portsmouth falling to Parliament after a little under a month of conflict.

== Build-up ==
In the lead up to the war, Portsmouth was viewed as highly valuable by both Parliament and the king. The Fortifications of Portsmouth were so strong that after it was captured by Parliament and properly garrisoned, it was suggested by some that it would take as many as 40,000 men to seize it. Its governor at the time was George Goring who managed to convince both sides of his loyalty and as a result received funds from both the king and Parliament. In 1641, Goring began to work on the town's defences. By November, Parliament had received reports that the work was focused on the landward side and this along with other claims that brought into question his loyalty to Parliament resulted in Goring receiving a summons to Parliament to explain himself. With his defence, Goring was not only able to convince the House of the innocence of his actions but received its applause and further monetary payments.

== Opening skirmishes ==
Goring declared for the king on 2 August. Parliament managed to implement a sea blockade on 8 August under Robert Rich, 2nd Earl of Warwick. On land, the Parliamentary forces were able to assemble on the top of Portsdown Hill on 10 August. Goring's preparations for a siege were far from comprehensive. Not only was his work on improving the defences incomplete but the town's stores held supplies for as little as two days. Between 10 and 12 August, the Portsmouth garrison raided the farms of Portsea Island for food with both grain and livestock being seized and either taken within the city walls or, in the case of some of the livestock, being left to graze beneath the city's guns. The Parliamentarian forces responded by landing a force with two cannons at the south east of the island and ferrying women, children, cattle and sheep across Langstone harbour to Hayling Island. At this point, Goring's forces peaked at about 500 men.

== Fall of Portsbridge ==
The Royalist defences on the bridge over Portsbridge Creek were attacked by 20 Parliamentarians on the evening of 12 August. The defenders numbering just eight put up little resistance. One was captured while the other seven managed to escape. The Parliamentarians also took the small fort to the north of the bridge.

== The siege ==
With the Parliamentarian forces now on Portsea Island, a few sallies by Parliamentarian forces resulted in indecisive skirmishes, causing a handful of casualties for both sides, along with a similar number of prisoners, some of which were exchanged. Desertion was soon a problem for the Royalist force and by 15 August, the Royalist garrison numbered just 200, of which it was thought half would desert if given a chance. By comparison, the Parliamentarian besiegers numbered some 740 men in total. During this phase of the conflict, a number of parleys took place, but aside from prisoner exchanges nothing was achieved as a result.

The conflict was not entirely limited to battles ashore. On the night of 15 August, Parliamentarian forces under Captain Browne Bushell captured the Henrietta Marie in a cutting out operation. At around the same time, the force blockading Portsmouth from the sea rose to number seven ships.

Meanwhile, the Parliamentarian forces began to prepare a firing position in Gosport under the direction of John Meldrum. The Royalist forces attempted to bombard the position but their shots had little effect. The Parliamentarians opened fire on the city with two cannons from the works on 20 August; counter-battery fire from Portsmouth's guns again had little effect. The cannon on the rest of the works opened fire on 2 September.

== Fall of Southsea Castle ==
By the start of September, the Royalist garrison of Southsea Castle consisted of only a dozen men. On the night of 4 September, a Parliamentarian force of 400 infantry equipped with ladders and backed by cavalry set out to attack the castle. Although the force was spotted and fired on by the guns of Portsmouth, they were able to make to the seaward side of the castle. Simultaneously, a small party approached the main gate and called on the castle to surrender. Captain Challoner was at the time somewhat inebriated and asked them to come back in the morning. At around this time, the guns of Portsmouth once more opened fire on the assaulting force, and the Parliamentarians responded by scaling the walls and capturing the castle without further opposition. A significant Parliamentarian garrison was then installed in the castle to keep it from being recaptured.

== Surrender ==
With the fall of Southsea Castle, the Royalists suffered further desertions with their forces falling to just 50–60 men, many of whom lacked training. Negotiations over the terms of surrender started at 10:00 on 4 September, with a final agreement being reached by 19:00. Under the terms of the agreement, the garrison was granted safe passage and all prisoners were released with the exception of Parliamentarian deserters. Goring chose to go via sea to Holland. The Royalists were in part able to obtain such favourable terms due to the threat of detonating Portsmouth's gunpowder reserves, including 1,200 barrels stored in the Square Tower. A couple of days were allowed for Goring and the garrison to settle their affairs and Parliament came into formal possession of the town on 7 September at 06:00.
