= Fortifications of Portsmouth =

Defensive structures protecting Portsmouth, England

Coordinates: 50.799°N 1.091°W

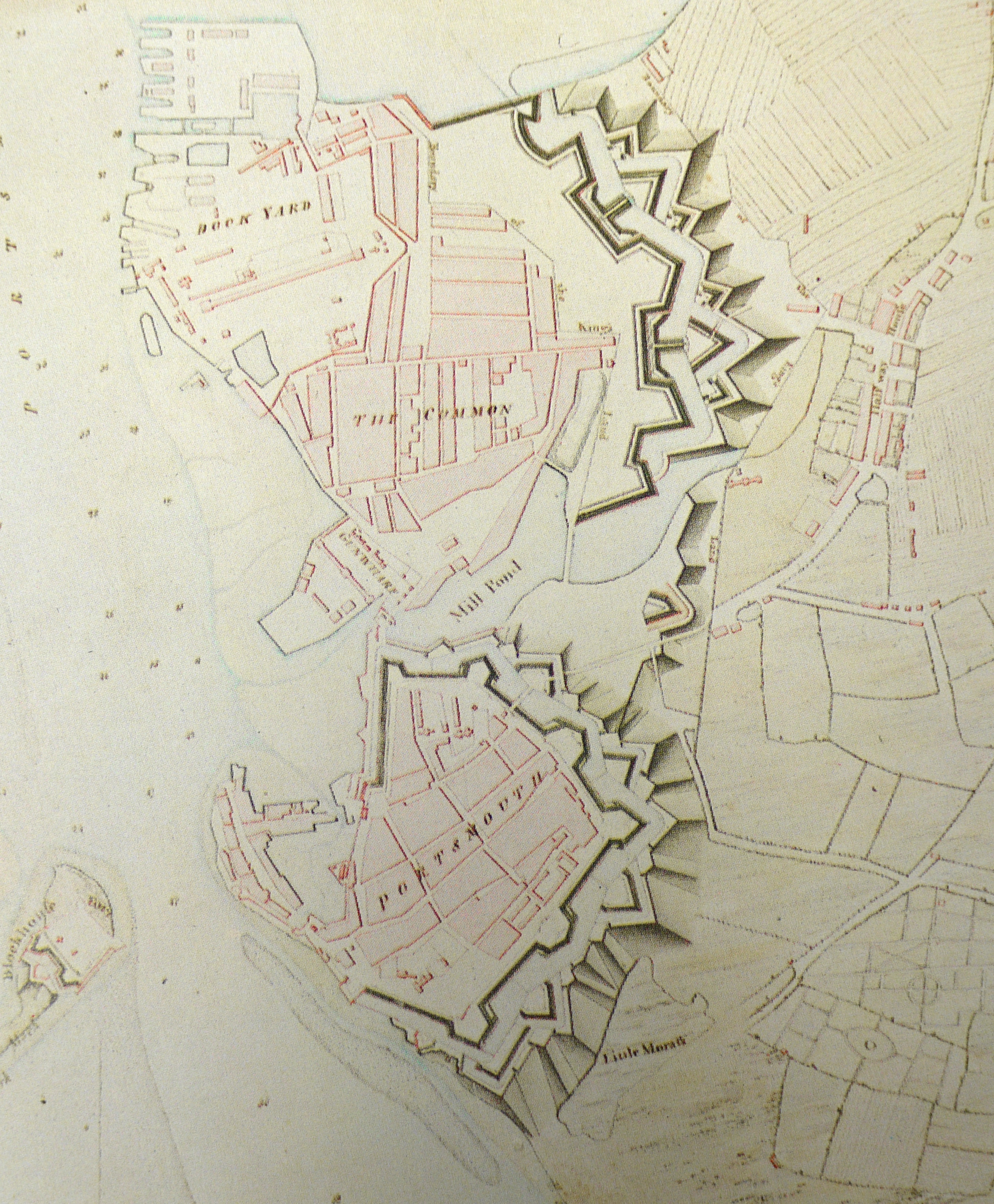
The walls of Portsmouth and the dockyard in 1773. The dockyard is to the north of the town and separated from it by the mill pond. To the East of the town is the Little Morass, an area of marshland.

The fortifications of Portsmouth are extensive due to its strategic position on the English Channel and role as home to the Royal Navy. For this reason, Portsmouth was, by the 19th century, one of the most fortified cities in the world. The fortifications have evolved over the centuries in response to changes in tactics and technology and the area defended has increased. While the first defences focused on Portsmouth Harbour, in step with the fortifications of Gosport, later defensive structures protected the whole of Portsea Island and an increasing distance inland. At the same time, the fortifications of Portsmouth and Gosport became part of the wider fortifications of the Solent. Old Portsmouth, on the southwest corner of Portsea Island, has been walled for much of its history.

== The first fortifications ==
The first fortification in the area was Portchester Castle, which, ultimately, dates back to the Roman Portus Adurni. Its position allowed it to provide a degree of defence for the upper reaches of Portsmouth Harbour. The first recorded fortifications on Portsea Island appear to have been a wall constructed in 1212 around a primitive shipyard sited just to the north of what later became Camber Dock. The wall lasted less than twelve years.

During the 14th century, Portsmouth was subject to attacks in 1338, 1369, 1377 and 1380. Evidence suggests that simple earthworks were constructed and reconstructed around the settlement in response. The first structure built to defend Portsmouth proper was a wooden version of the Round Tower constructed between 1418 and 1426. Four years later, a second wooden tower was added on the opposite side of the harbour.

== Expansion under the Tudors ==
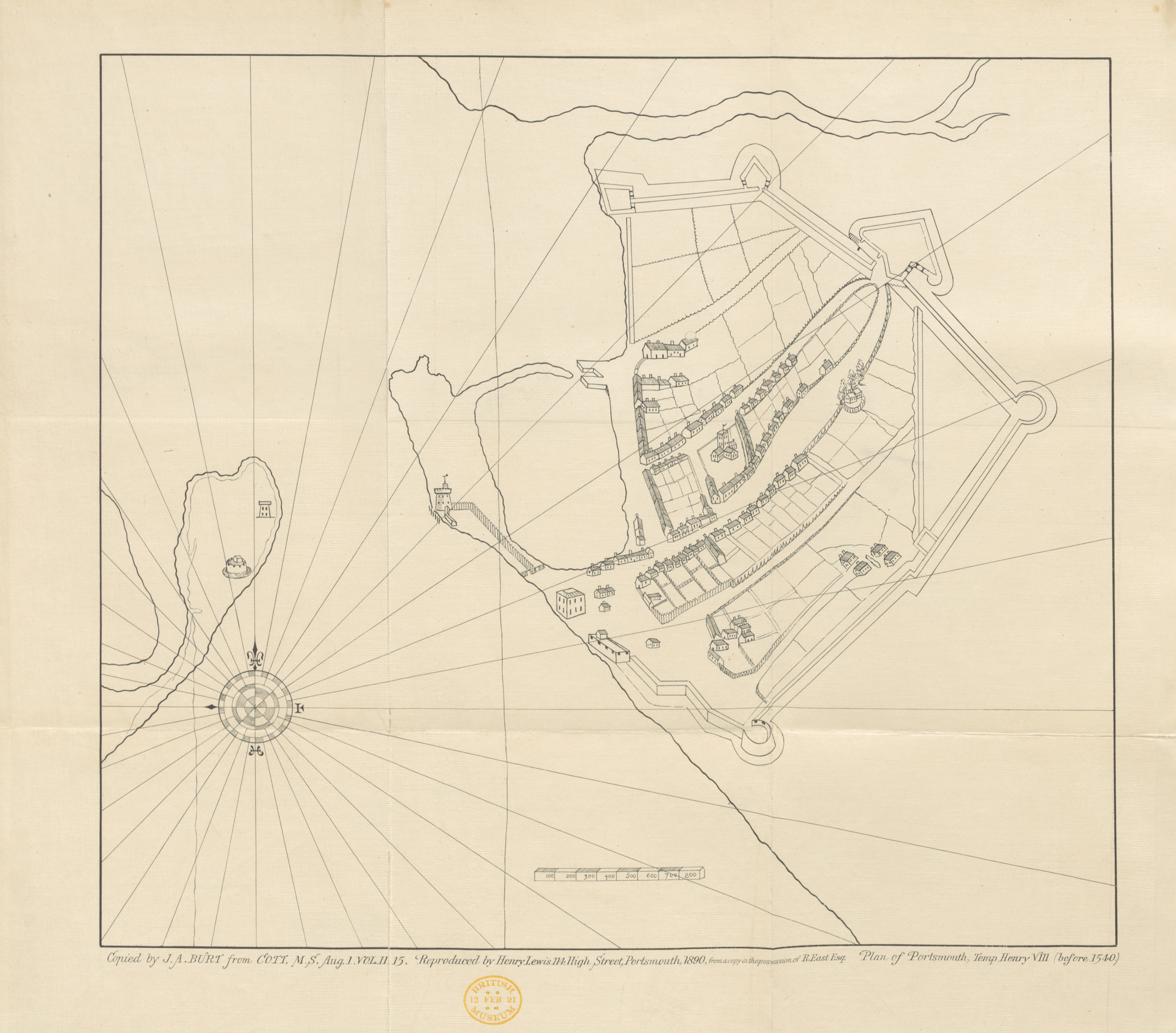
A map of Portsmouth showing the defences in the time of Henry VIII.

During Henry VII's rule, the Round Tower was rebuilt in stone and the Square Tower added. There is, however, some question as regards the extent to which it was meant to be a defensive structure. It appears likely that what is now known as the "saluting platform" was also built during Henry VII's reign. Southsea Castle at the southern tip of Portsea Island was built by his son and successor Henry VIII.

To the north of the city, it is believed that a small fortification was constructed to defend the bridge across Portsbridge Creek. In 1522, the first of several defensive chains that could be raised in an attempt to block the harbour entrance was ordered.

By 1542, Portsmouth was surrounded by defensive ramparts and towers built from earth and wood. One tower was positioned on the corner where the wall extending from the saluting platform met the wall running along the southeast rampart of the town. The southeast rampart was also equipped with what appears to be a firing platform, while another tower was constructed on the corner where the ramparts to the south east and the northeast of the town met. In the centre of the northwest rampart was the town gate defended by a structure known as The Mount which also acted as a bastion. Finally, the wall to the north of the town had a tower at each end one where it joined the northeast wall and one where it met the sea. Gabions were constructed along the edge of the Camber dock area and a palisade made to separate Portsmouth Point from the town. A wooden wall was constructed between the Round Tower and the saluting platform at around the same time.

The cannon at Portsmouth and their positions were listed by Edward Vaughan, Captain of Portsmouth, in the inventory of Henry VIII in the first year of the reign of Edward VI. Vaughan mentions guns made by William Levett and the Arcano family. John Ridley was Captain of the Tower, John Chadderton was Captain of the South Castle, and John Lymden was Captain of the Bulwark at the West Haven. Vaughan reported that there were not enough gunners and the gates at the water side were no longer secure.

The next phase of expansion started in the late 1550s and continued through the rest of Elizabeth I's reign. From about 1560, the work was largely under the direction of Richard Popynjay. The ramparts were updated and the gabions along the edge of the Camber and the palisade that cut off Portsmouth point were replaced by stone wall. Other works including improving the various towers with some of them developing into bastions. The Mount defending the town gate was reconstructed, developing into what could be considered a true bastion in the process. The saluting platform also saw some rebuilding work during this period.

Another development during this period is that an increasing number of the names used for the fortifications survived until the present day. The bastion on the corner where the wall extending from the saluting platform met the wall running along the southeast rampart of the town was recorded as Green's Bulwark or Chaterton's Bulwark. Of the two towers on the corners of the north wall of the town the one at the western end was known as the Dock Bulwark while the one at the eastern end is recorded as Guyes Bulwark. The mount is also recorded as being known as the Great Bastion. The gate that controlled access to Portsmouth point was known as the North Gate although by 1571 it (along with other parts of the fortifications) was in a poor state of repair.

The second half of Elizabeth I's reign saw yet more work on the bastions and the first bridge at the Landport gate which was constructed in about 3 years starting 1586. During this time there also appears to have seen a fair amount of repair work. Sometime around 1600 a new gate known as point gate replaced the North Gate in controlling access to Portsmouth point.

== During the Civil War ==
At the time of the Civil War, the fortifications mounted around 100 guns and when properly manned were considered by some to be able to withstand a siege of 40,000 men. In one of the first actions of the civil war Parliament managed to capture the city from the royalist forces during the Siege of Portsmouth.

== Reconstruction under Charles II ==
Map, c.1668, showing Portsmouth's fortifications, together with Fort Blockhouse on Gosport point and a defensive chain across the harbour entrance.

In 1665, Charles II ordered Bernard de Gomme to begin the reconstruction of Portsmouth's fortifications, a process which was to take many years. The year before this a new chain to block the harbour entrance was ordered at a cost of £200. Starting 1678 Fort James was constructed on Burrow Island. Later in the 1680s Southsea castle was rebuilt. In the same decade the Portsbridge fort was also rebuilt.

The city walls were again rebuilt. A second moat was also added with a new defensive line being constructed between the two moats. A ravelin was added at Landport where the London road entered the city.

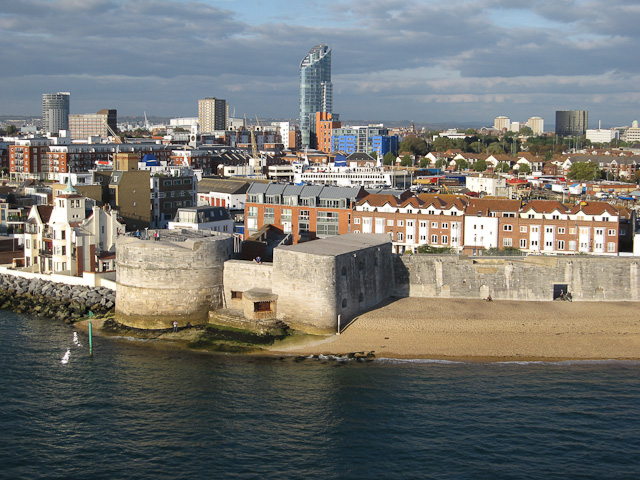
Round Tower and Point Battery

On the shoreline a new battery was built at the end of Portsmouth point facing Gosport. Another battery, this one with 18 guns, was built that connected to the round tower with a further battery constructed between the square tower and the saluting platform. Beyond this battery, but connected to it by a tunnel, Spur redoubt was constructed.

While the towns defences were being strengthened some thought appears to have been given to their aesthetic appearance. In 1665 Lieutenant-Governor Sir Philip Honeywood ordered that trees be planted on the town walls.

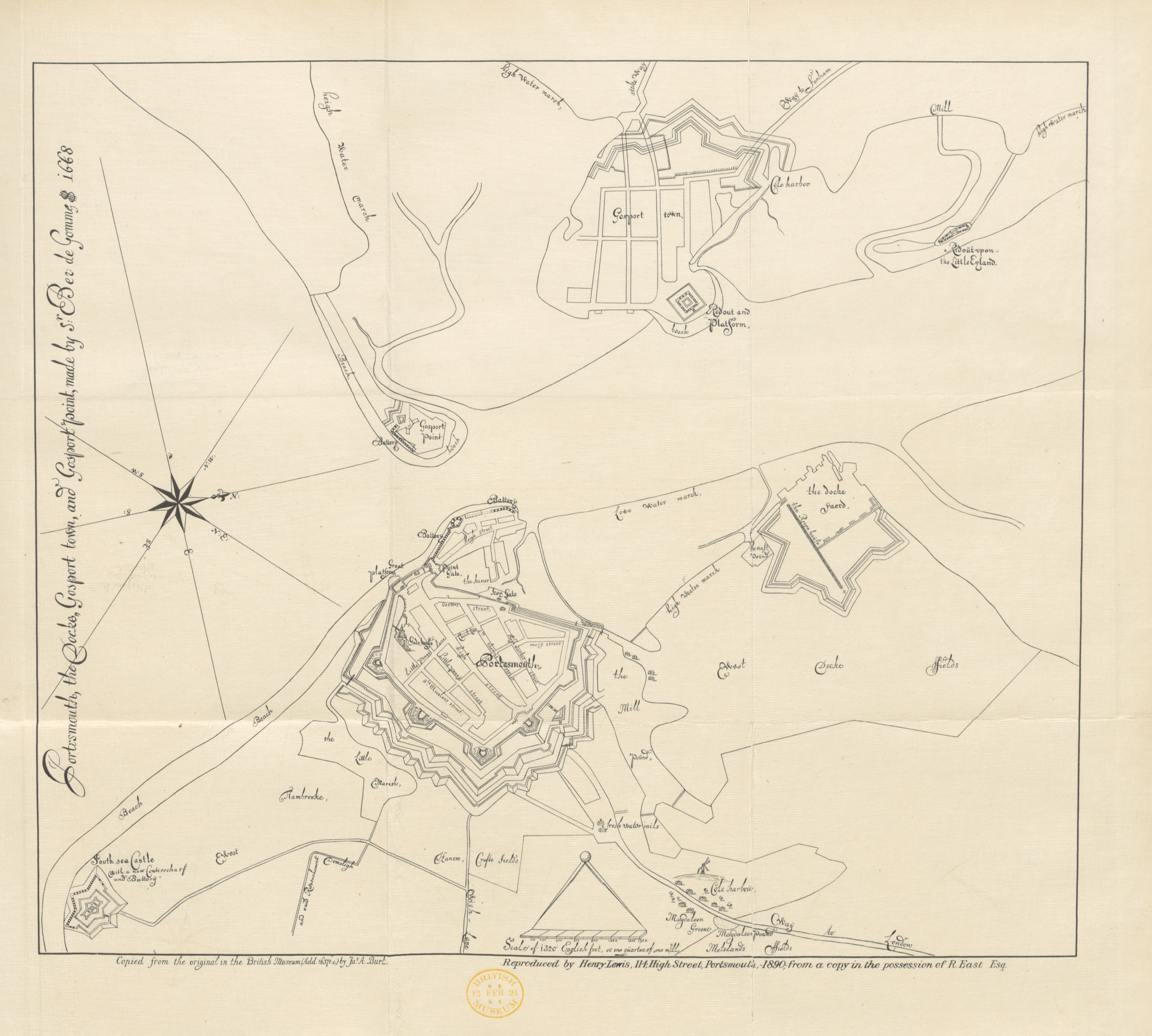
Copy of de Gomme's plan of 'Portsmouth, the Docke, Gosport town and Gosport pointe' in 1668.

In 1679 Sir Bernard de Gomme built barracks within the town to accommodate two Companies of Foot (120 men) to man the defences. His plan and specification for the building (a double range of ten bays, 153 ft 6 in (46.79 m) long by 36 ft 2 in (11.02 m) deep) represents 'the earliest known detailed drawing of a barracks in England'. The soldiers slept two to a bed, four to a room, with additional rooms being provided for officers at each end of the block, and for sergeants in the middle of the ground floor. By 1684 there were barracks in addition at the Round Tower, and a two-storey block at the Landport Gate.

The first true fortification of the dockyard was constructed between 1665 and 1668 although there had previously been a wall around it. The fortification consisted of an earthen rampart with a single bastion and two demi-bastions.

Later in the 17th century in 1688 the fort protecting the crossing across Portsbridge creek was rebuilt under the direction of the Chief Royal Engineer Sir Martin Beckman.

== 18th century ==
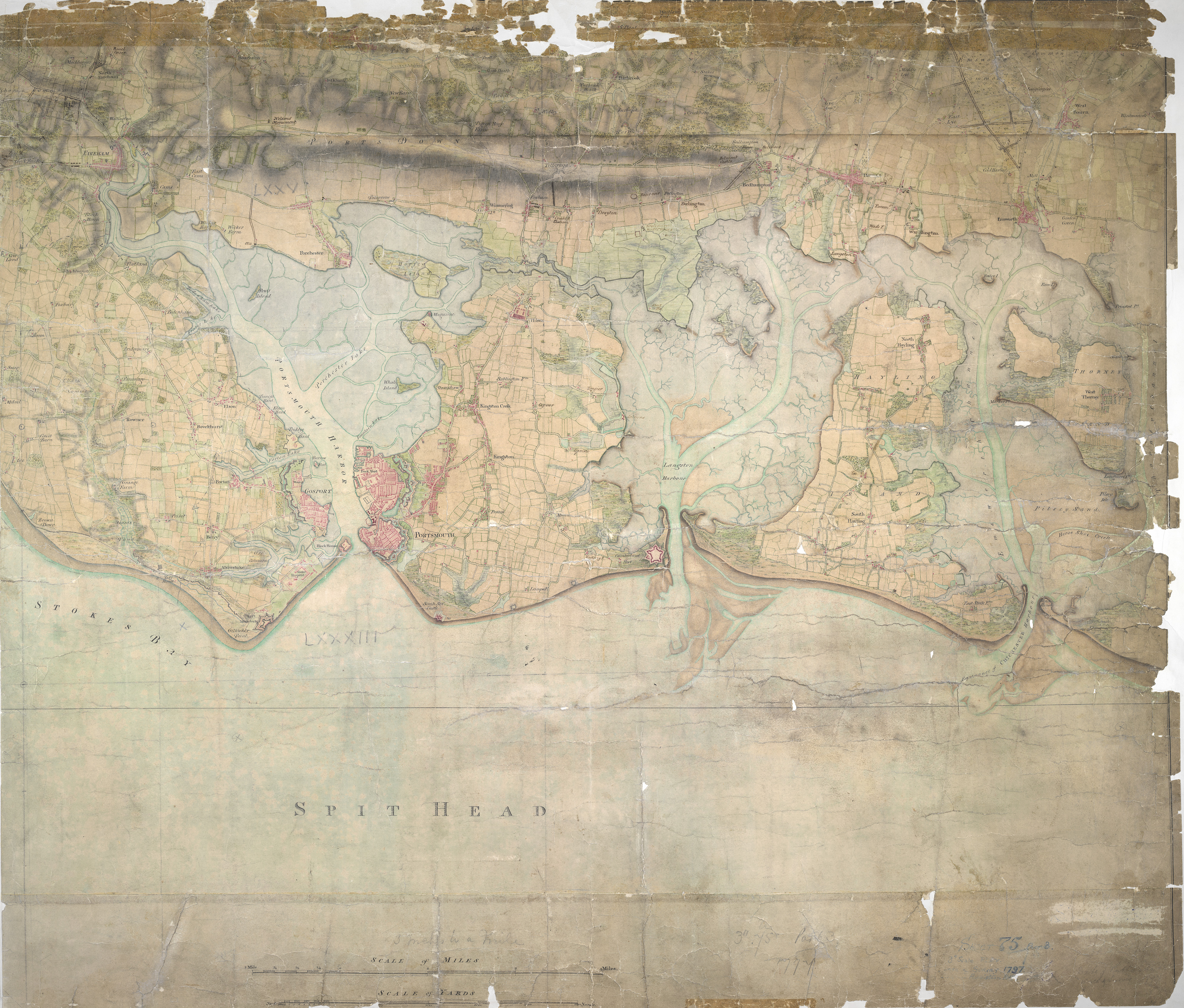
1797 Ordnance Survey map, showing fortifications around Portsmouth and Portsea, fortified Gosport to the west, Hilsea Lines to the north, Fort Cumberland to the east.

In the 18th century, Portsea started to grow up around the dockyard and in the 1770s a series of ramparts and moats were constructed to protect this new settlement.

The sheer manpower required by de Gomme's defences meant that after about 1730 the double moat system used around Portsmouth was abandoned with the outer moat being filled in.

At the same time the defences started to focus on protecting the whole of Portsea island. The Portsbridge fort was again rebuilt in 1746. During 1756 and 1757 the first Hilsea lines were constructed in order to protect the north of Portsea island. The first Fort Cumberland was constructed to prevent hostile forces from sailing to Langstone harbour and the first Lumps Fort and Eastney battery were built to protect Eastney beach.

== 19th century ==
The city and harbour's most recent comprehensive fortifications were built as a result of the 1859 Royal Commission on the Defence of the United Kingdom and consist of the Palmerston Forts in the Solent, the line of Forts situated along the top of Portsdown Hill, forts in Gosport and the Hilsea Lines.

Fort Cumberland and Lumps Fort were significantly rebuilt.

The Portsea fortifications were expanded slightly in the 1840s and 1860s as the dockyard was extended.

The city walls though were for the most part removed in the 1870s and 80s a task accomplished through the use of convict labour.

== 20th century ==
Improvements in artillery technology had rendered the various landward facing fortifications obsolete over the turn of the century and by the end of the first decade they largely disarmed.

After World War 1 the city council started to buy various defences as they were released by the military. The 1920s and 30s saw the purchase of much of the Hilsea lines and Lumps fort by the city.

During WW2 anti tank defence blocks were constructed on Fraser Beach. Pill boxes were constructed to defend Portsmouth Airport in the form of Pickett-Hamilton Forts. The sea forts were re-equipped with AA guns. A new concrete gun emplacement which contained a single 75mm gun was constructed on the eastern part of the Hilsea lines.

The remaining defences were deactivated when the UK abandoned coastal artillery in 1956.

== Surviving fortifications ==
Of the defences constructed Portsea Island, Southsea Castle, Fort Cumberland, The Round tower, The Square tower, Lumps Fort, Parts of the Hilsea lines, the Spur Redoubt and parts of the walls of old Portsmouth along the seafront all survive. Various fortifications within the naval dockyard also exist.

Beyond Portsea the majority of the Portsdown Forts remain although Fort Wallington has been largely demolished.

Of the four gates in the walls of Old Portsmouth only Landport Gate survives in its original position. King James's gate, Lion Gate and Unicorn Gate have been re-erected slightly further away.

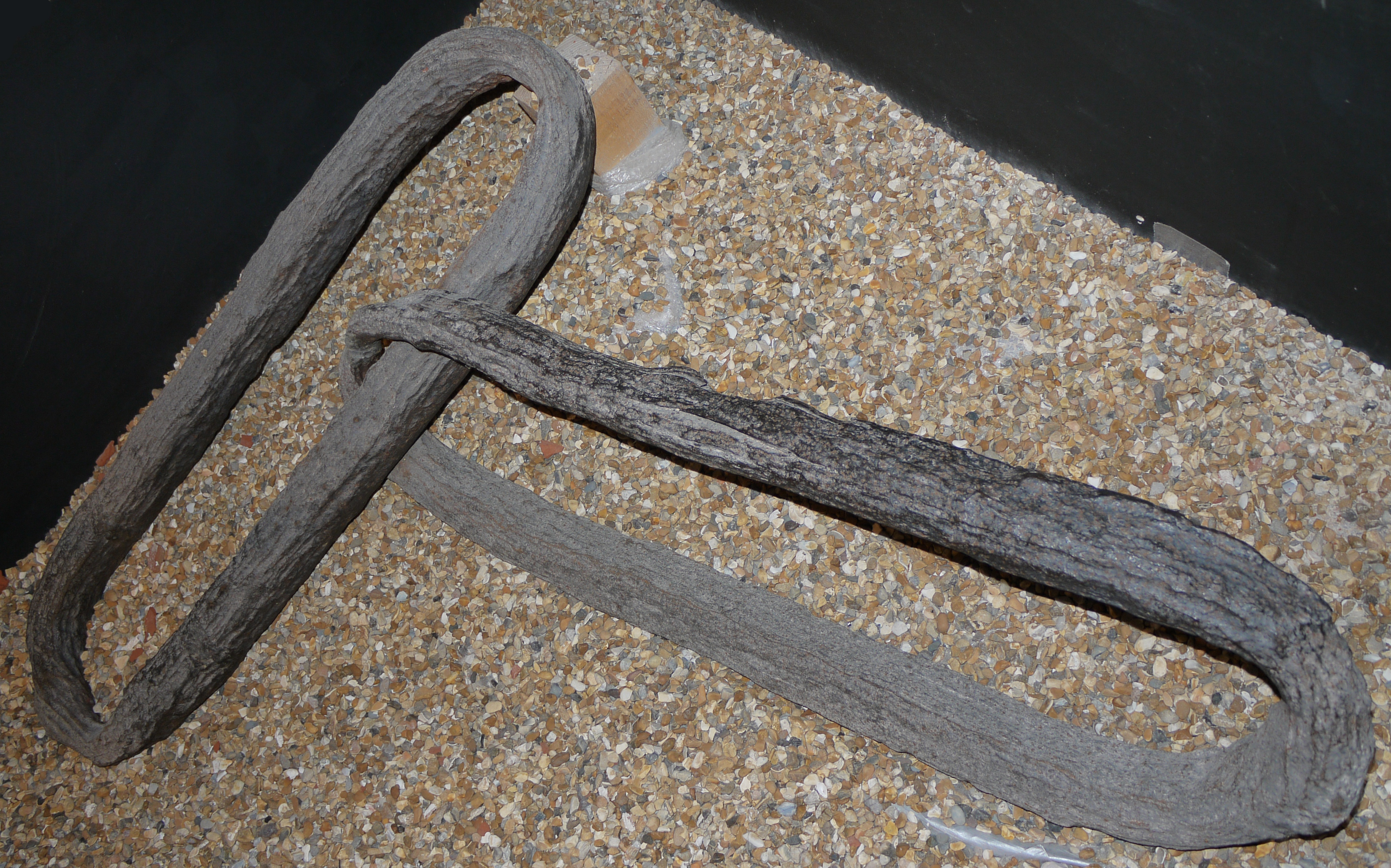
The pair of links from one of the harbour boom chains that is on display at Southsea Castle

Antitank defence blocks on Fraser Beach are now a Grade II listed structure. A pair of links from one of the harbour boom chains are on display at Southsea castle. One of the Pickett-Hamilton forts constructed to protect the airport was on display outside the D-Day Story in Southsea. This was removed in 2017 when the museum was refurbished.

== See also ==
- List of fortifications
- King James's and Landport Gates
