= List of fortifications =

This is a list of fortifications past and present, a fortification being a major physical defensive structure often composed of a more or less wall-connected series of forts.

== Individual fortifications ==
listed by name

- A Famosa, built in the 16th century in Malacca by the Portuguese following their defeat of the Malaccan Sultanate
- Alderney
- Alpine Wall
- Anastasian Wall, built in the 5th century across the Thracian peninsula for the protection of Constantinople
- Antonine Wall, built by the Romans in northern Britain
- Babylon Fortress in Old Cairo.
- Baggush Box
- Bar Lev Line
- Beijing city fortifications
- British anti-invasion preparations of the Second World War
  - British hardened field defences of World War II
- Castle of Bouka, Preveza, Greece
- Brimstone Hill Fortress, Saint Thomas Middle Island, Saint Kitts and Nevis
- Cairo Citadel, Egypt
- Çakmak Line
- Castle Islands Fortifications, Bermuda
- Chester city walls, Chester, England
- Corradino Lines, Paola, Malta
- Cottonera Lines, Cottonera, Malta
- Czechoslovak border fortifications
- Danevirke
- Devils Battery, Halifax Harbour, Nova Scotia
- Defense line of Amsterdam
- The Dutch Water Line, protecting the core provinces of the Netherlands, utilising the flooding of areas with water
- Elvas Fortifications, the largest bulwarked dry ditch system in the world, protecting the Portuguese garrison border town of Elvas
- Fortified district
  - Molotov Line
  - Stalin Line
- German World War II fortresses / Fortress Europe
  - Alpine Fortress
  - Atlantic Wall
  - Festung Norwegen
  - Festungsfront Oder-Warthe-Bogen
  - Siegfried Line
- Floriana Lines, Floriana, Malta
- Fort Carré
- Fort Jesus, built in the 15th century in Mombassa by the Portuguese
- Fortress of Humaitá, 19th century gateway to Paraguay.
- Götavirke (Sweden)
- Great Wall of China, built as a protection from the northern steppe nomads
- Great Abatis Border
- Gustav Line, a fortified German defensive line in Italy during the Second World War
- Hadrian's Wall, built by the Romans in northern Britain
- Hexamilion wall, built across the Isthmus of Corinth
- Hilsea Lines, built to protect Portsmouth
- Hindenburg line
- Hindenburg Wall
- Intramuros, Manila
- Justinian Walls (in several locations along the borders of the Byzantine Empire)
- Klis Fortress in Croatia
- Krepost Sveaborg, Imperial Russian First World War fortifications around Helsinki
- Limes Germanicus, Roman defensive line along the Rhine and in South-western Germany
- Limes Moesiae - defensive frontier system in Southeast Europe, a collection of Roman fortifications between the Black Sea shore and Pannonia, present-day Hungary, consisting primarily of forts along the Danube (so-called Danubian Limes) to protect the Roman provinces of Upper and Lower Moesia south of the river
- Lines of Torres Vedras, built to protect the Lisbon Region, during the Peninsular War
- London Wall, the Roman wall around the city
- Maginot Line, built by France in the 1930s
- Mannerheim Line, built by Finland across the Karelian Isthmus
- Metaxas Line, built during 1936–1940 by Greece along its frontier with Bulgaria
- Montségur
- National Redoubt (Belgium)
- Newcastle town wall
- Offa's Dyke, an 8th-century earthwork dividing England and Wales
- Grim's Ditch
- Per Albin Line (Sweden)
- Petrovaradin fortress, in Northern Serbia, Austrian fortress from the 18th century
- Rupel Fortress, in Northern Greece, later incorporated in the Metaxas Line
- Rupnik Line
- Santa Margherita Lines, in Cospicua, Malta
- Saxon Shore, in southern Britain and northern France
- Suomenlinna, an 18th-century fortress in Helsinki
- Toblerone line
- Valtellina Redoubt
- Victoria Lines, in northern Malta
- York city walls

== Articles relating to cities ==
=== Europe ===
- Ceintures de Lyon, built in the 19th century to surround the city of Lyon, France
- Walled city of Jajce, Bosnia
- Walled city of Počitelj, Bosnia
- Walled city of Vratnik, Bosnia
- Walls of Constantinople (modern day Istanbul), surrounding the city since the 4th century
- Walls of Dubrovnik, Croatia
- Roman walls of Lugo, Galicia, surrounding the city since the 1st century
- Walls of Ávila, Spain
- Walls of Nicosia, Cyprus
- Walls of Ston, Croatia
- Fortifications of Antwerp, Belgium
- Fortifications of Birgu, Malta
- Fortifications of Chania, Crete, Greece
- Fortifications of Famagusta, Cyprus
- Fortifications of Heraklion, Crete, Greece
- Fortifications of London, England
  - Lines of Communication (London), English Civil War fortifications built around London between 1642 and 1643
  - London Defence Positions
  - Outer London Defence Ring
  - Military citadels under London
- Fortifications of Kotor, Montenegro
- Fortifications of Mdina, Malta
- Fortifications of Messina, Sicily, Italy
- Fortifications of Metz, France
- Fortifications of Portsmouth, England
- Fortifications of Senglea, Malta
- Fortifications of Valletta, Malta
- Defence lines of the Netherlands
- List of town walls in England and Wales
- Rocca di Manerba del Garda (Lombardy), Italy

=== Africa ===
- Egypt

== See also ==
- List of buildings
- List of castles
- List of forts
- List of walls
- List of cities with defensive walls
- List of established military terms (Engineering)
- Martello tower
