= Point Battery =

- Portsmouth
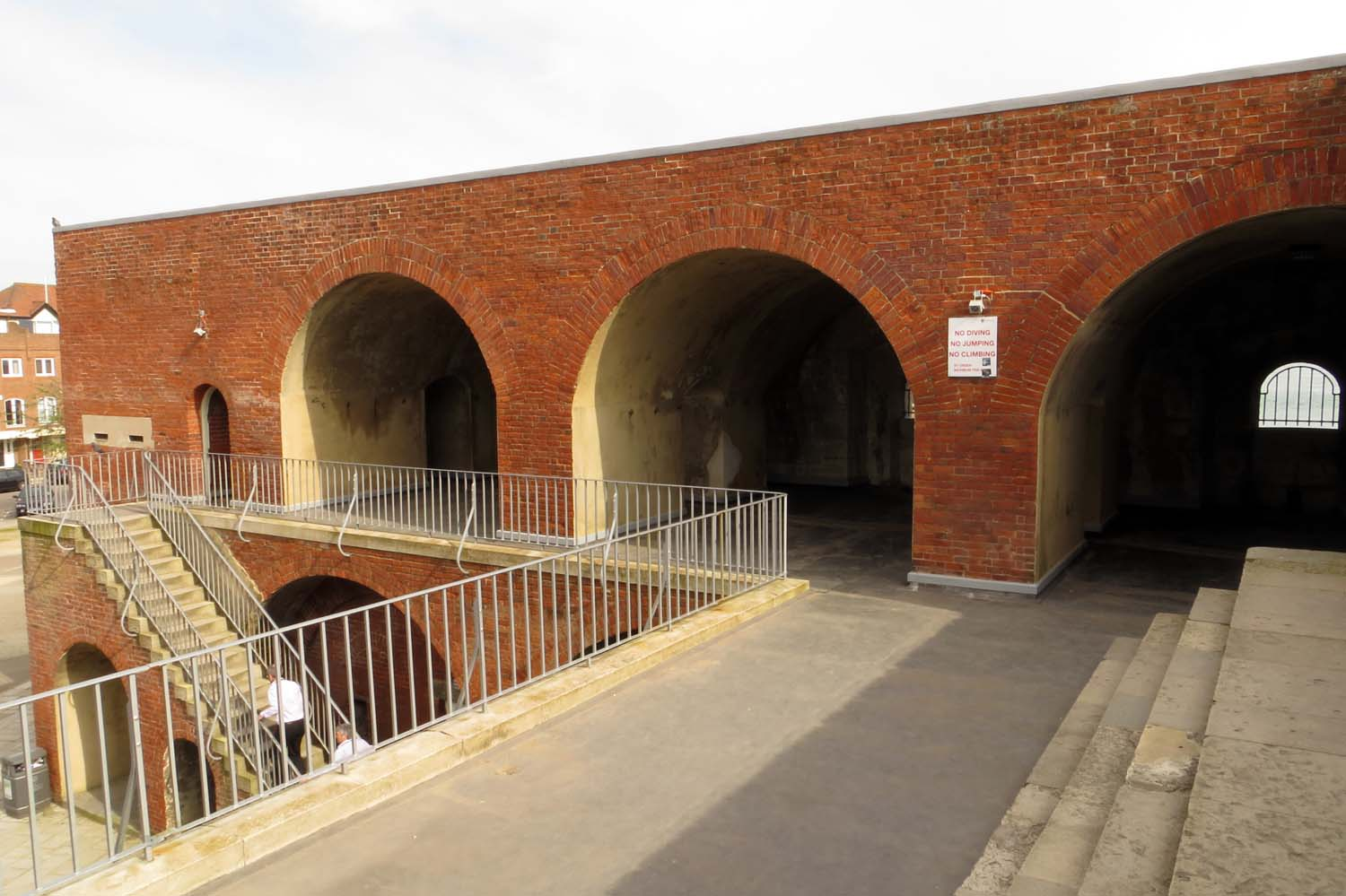
- The Flanking Battery, as seen from the Round Tower

Site information
- Type: Coastal artillery
- Owner: Portsmouth City Council

Location
- Location within Hampshire
- Coordinates: 50.79045°N 1.10865°W

Site history
- Built: c. 1680
- Built for: Board of Ordnance
- Architect: Bernard de Gomme
- In use: 1680-1956

Garrison information
- Occupants: Royal Artillery

Point Battery (which is also known by its earlier name, Eighteen Gun Battery) is a former gun emplacement on Portsmouth Point in Hampshire. Part of the fortifications of Portsmouth, it was built alongside an earlier defensive structure (the 15th-century Round Tower) to help defend Portsmouth Harbour in the event of an attack. Fort Blockhouse on the other side of the harbour entrance was rebuilt at around the same time as part of the same scheme. In the mid-19th century the battery was enlarged and Point Barracks were built alongside, to house the artillery troops responsible for manning the defences.

Point Battery, along with the barracks and other associated structures, is a Grade I listed building.

== History ==
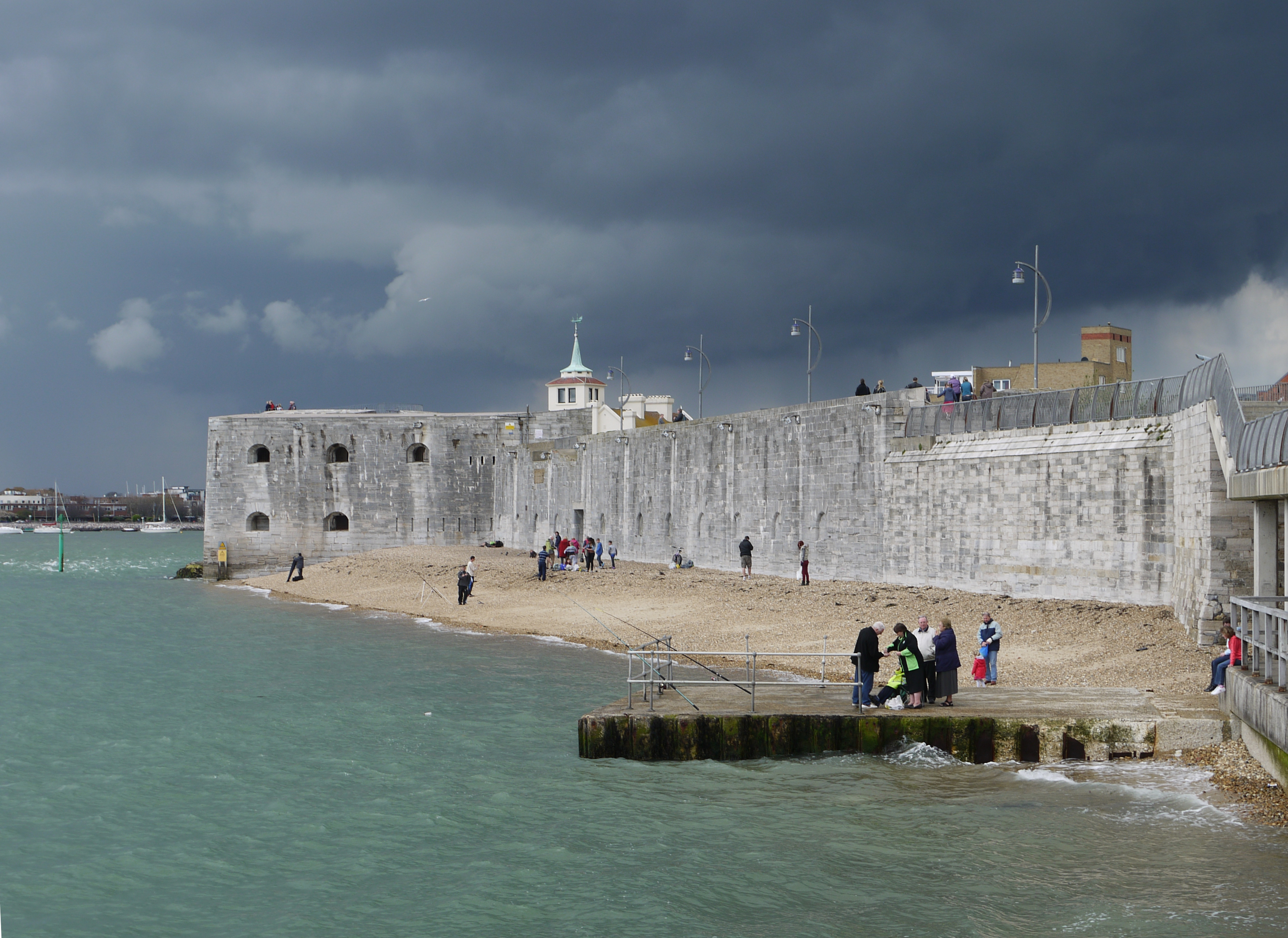
The main battery (centre) and flanking battery (left) as seen from the harbour entrance.

The gun battery was created as part of Bernard de Gomme's rebuilding of the fortifications around Portsmouth in the late seventeenth century. It is a casemated structure which originally consisted of a long row of twelve gun emplacements facing out to sea, joined at the northern end to a protruding battery (known as the 'Flanking Battery'), which housed a further four guns in casemates. Two more casemates then completed the structure, linking the Flanking Battery to the Round Tower. In the mid-18th century one of the twelve main casemates was converted into a sally port.

In 1847 the battery was modified: the main casemates were deepened and expanded to accommodate new 68-pounder guns and an extra storey was added to the Flanking Battery to create five casemates on two levels (each housing a 32-pounder smoothbore gun). At the same time several houses along Broad Street, behind the battery, were demolished to enable the construction of buildings to form a barracks.

=== Point Barracks ===
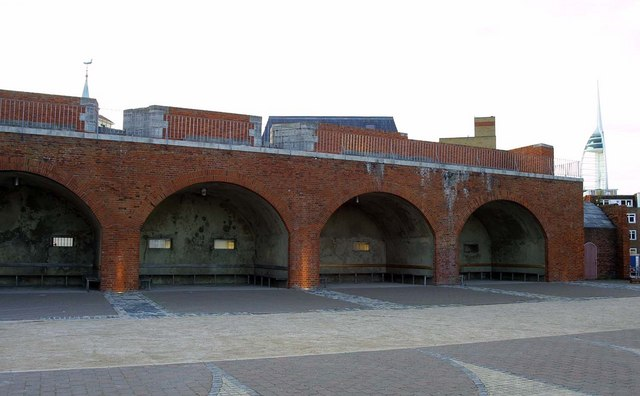
Point Barracks: the remains of the soldiers' quarters.

The barracks were built to provide living accommodation for Royal Artillery units responsible for defending Portsmouth and were completed between 1847 and 1850. Accommodation for soldiers was provided in a casemated block of four vaulted chambers, built to the east of the Round Tower (and linked to the latter by an L-shaped caponier with rifle slits for landward defence). On the roof of the barracks block were two en barbette gun emplacements.

Officers and NCOs were housed in buildings alongside the boundary wall that provided the frontage to Broad Street. A narrow parade ground was formed between the casemates to the west, the soldiers' barracks to the north and the officers' quarters to the east; entry to the barracks was by way of a gate at the narrow southern end of the compound.

=== Later developments ===
Over time the battery benefited from improvements in artillery equipment. In the late 1890s three 12-pounder quick-firing guns were installed on the roof of the battery (and another on the roof of the Round Tower); these were replaced by a twin 6-pounder quick-firing gun in the late 1930s.

==== Decommissioning ====
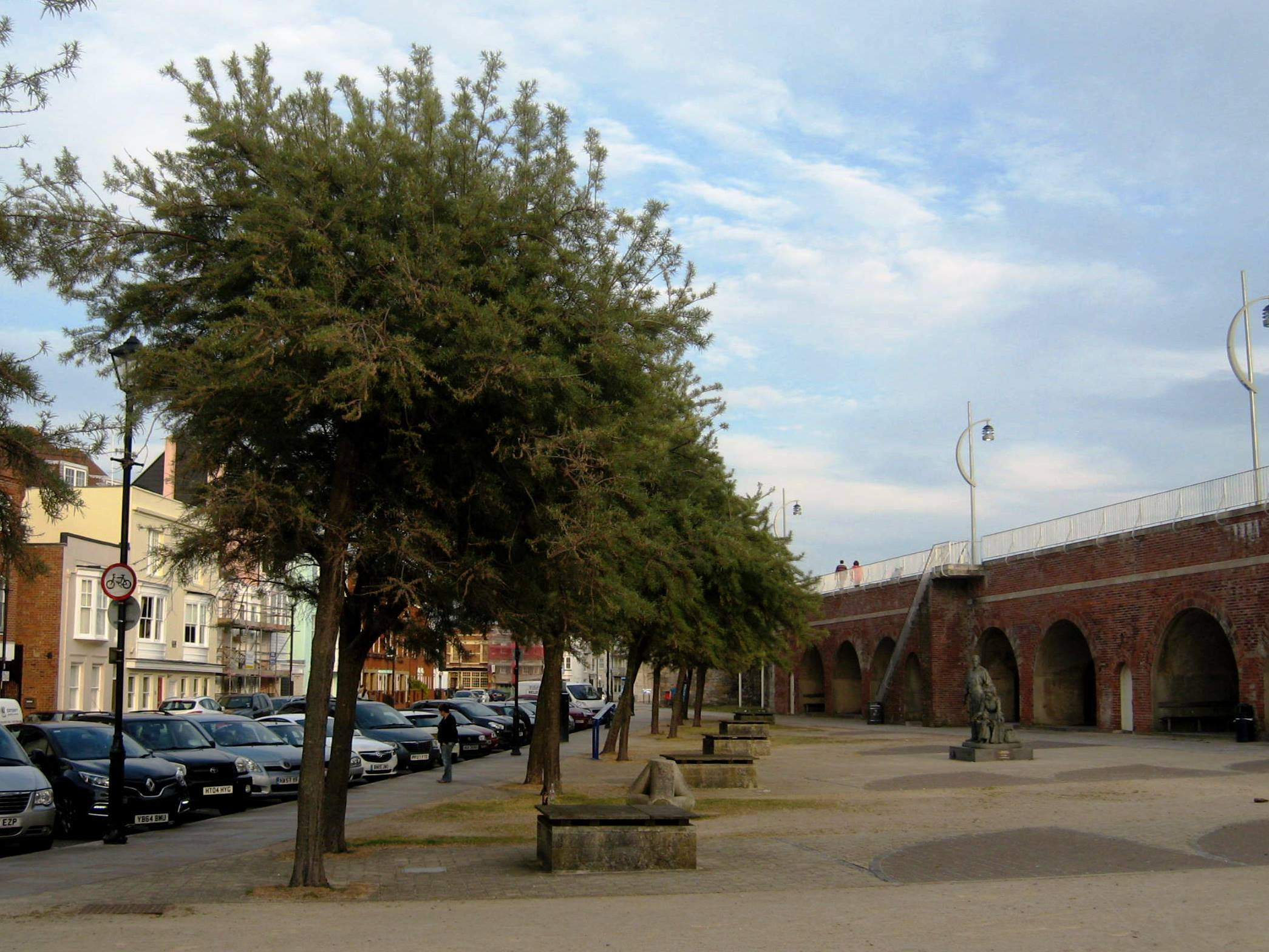
The surviving casemates of the gun battery (right).

Following disbandment of the UK's coastal artillery network after the Second World War, the battery and barracks were decommissioned in the early 1960s and the site was acquired by Portsmouth City Council. The area was opened up by demolishing the boundary wall and adjacent buildings. The rear wall of the casemates was removed, along with the roof-mounted gun emplacements. The southern half of the soldiers' barracks was also demolished, but the outline of the old barracks rooms is marked by stones in the ground alongside the surviving casemates.

== Present day ==
The upper part of the battery forms part of the seafront promenade between the Round Tower and the Square Tower to the south. Since the closure of the barracks the casemates had largely lain empty, but in 2014 the City Council secured funding to convert the spaces into 'a vibrant new creative quarter' known as 'Hotwalls Studios', which provides workspaces for artists alongside a 'deli-style café'.
