= Lumps Fort =

Coordinates: 50.7811°N 1.0680°W

- Southsea, England
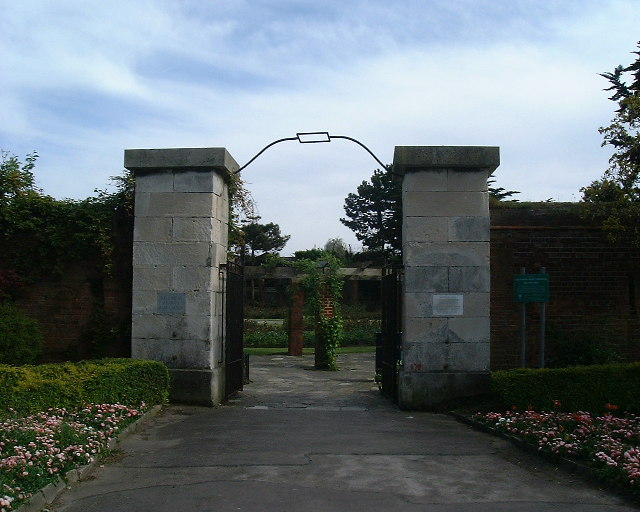
- Entrance to Lumps Fort

Site information
- Type: Fort
- Owner: Portsmouth City Council
- Open to the public: Yes
- Condition: Mostly complete

Location
- Location within Hampshire

Site history
- Built: 1859–1861
- Materials: Brick, earth

Lumps Fort is a disused fortification built on Portsea Island as part of the defences for the naval base at Portsmouth.

== Early history ==
Lumps Fort dates from the 18th century. The earliest reference is in the records of the Board of Ordnance in 1805 which mention "Lumps Fort-three 32-pounder guns".

By 1822 the fort was the site of a semaphore station on the semaphore line from London to Portsmouth. It was constructed here to avoid the smog of the town of Portsmouth which would impede direct optical communications from Portsdown Hill. The fort was out of use as a defensive fort by the 1820s and in 1827 part of the fort fell into the sea. The semaphore station was closed in 1847 when the electrical telegraph took over.

== Palmerston-era reconstruction ==
The fort was reconstructed between 1859 and 1869 as one of the Palmerston forts in the line of Portsmouth Harbour defences. It was designed to be fitted with 17 guns and had a barrack block at the rear to accommodate 100 men. It was not normally manned, with only a Master Gunner normally in residence at the Fort - in 1885 the Master Gunner was H Orchard. It was also used by units of the Volunteer Artillery - the City of London Artillery Volunteers undertook gun practice from there in 1889.

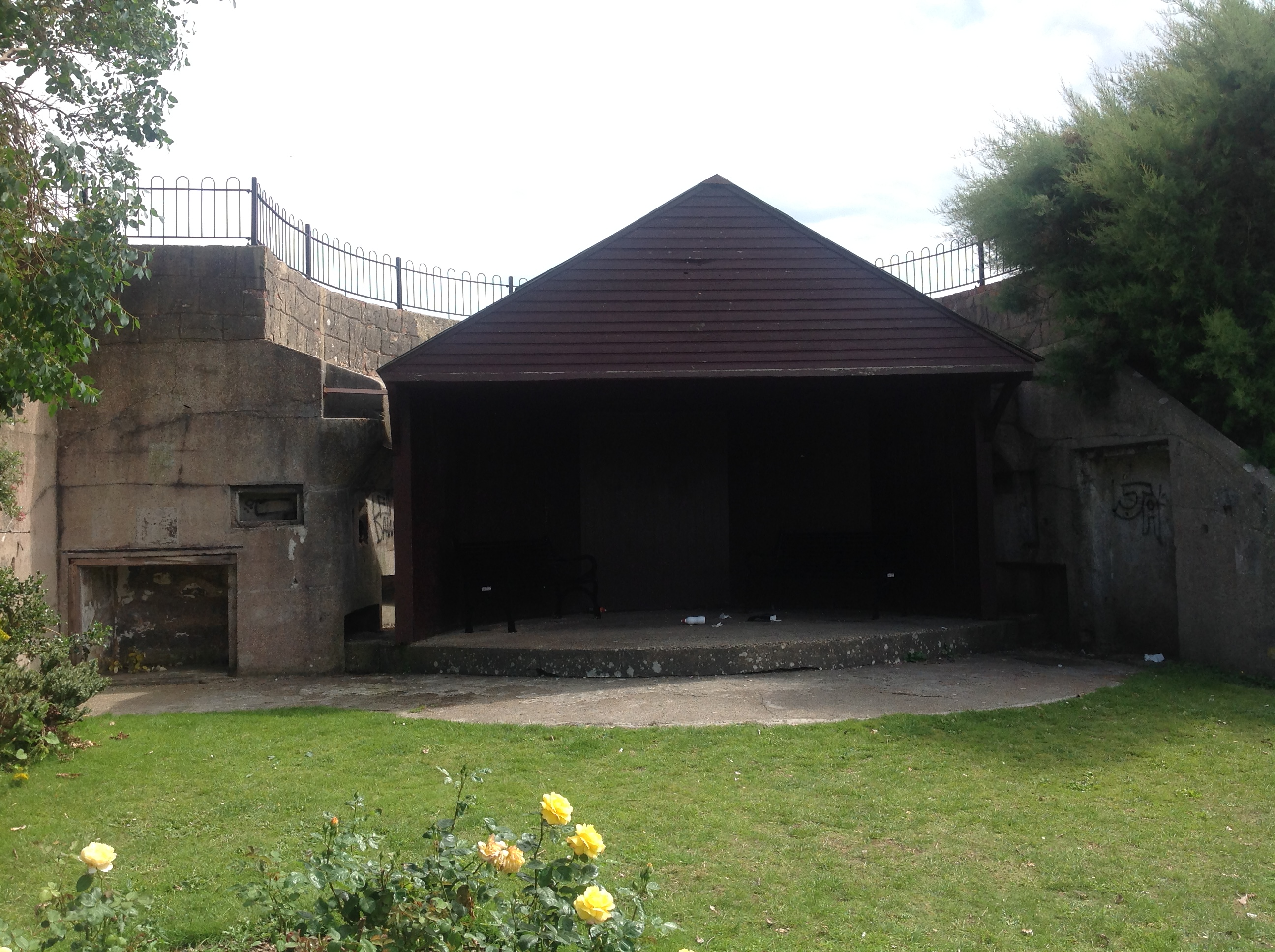
6-inch Hydropneumatic gun position, Lumps Fort (now Southsea Rose Garden, 2016

It was re-armed in the 1890s with three 6-inch rifled breech-loader Mk. IV guns on hydropneumatic carriages. These guns were taken away in 1906, but the fort was rearmed in 1914. It was then a beach defence battery and was armed with a 6-pounder Hotchkiss anti-aircraft gun. At the end of the World War I, it was demolished, leaving only an outline.

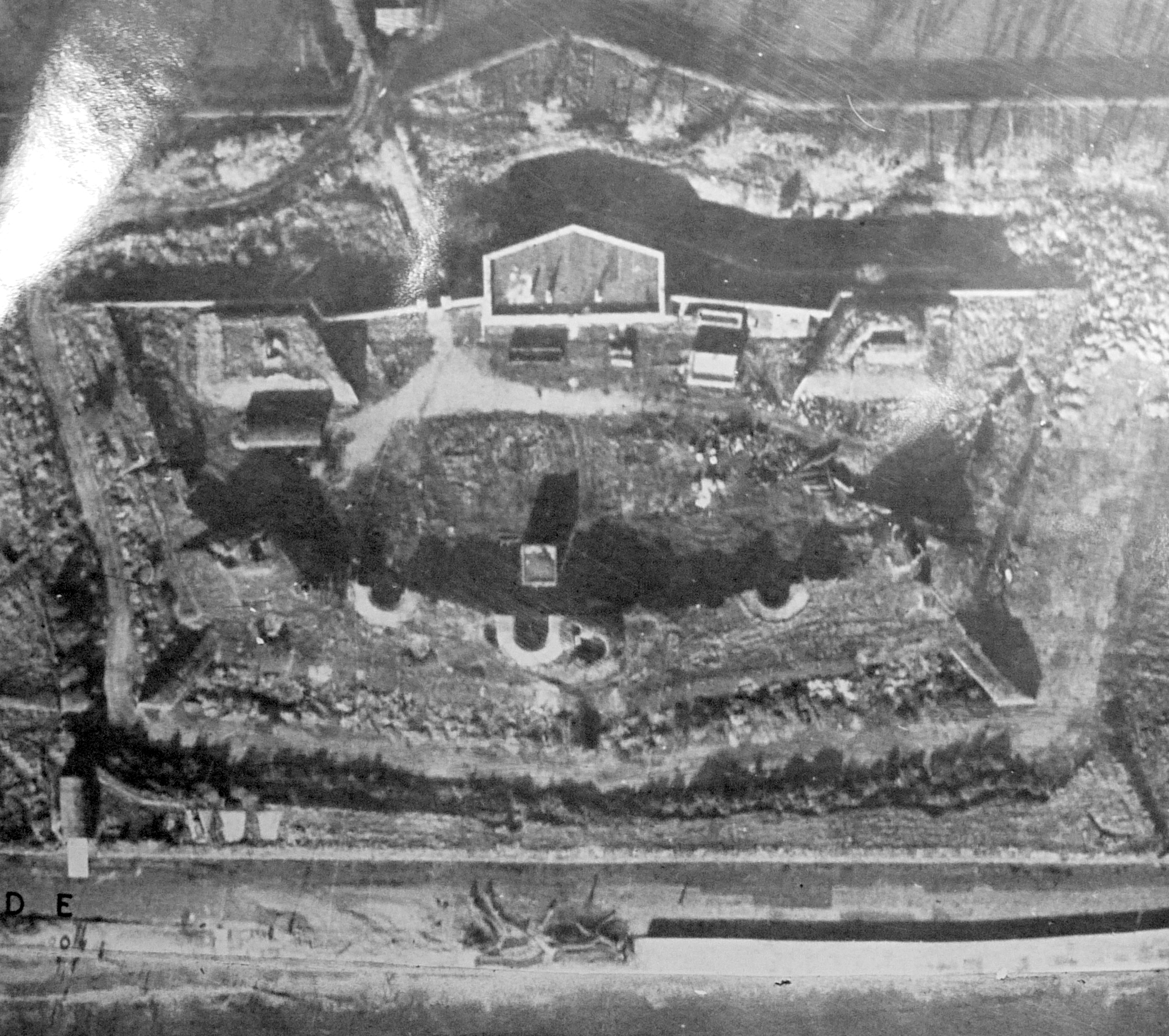
Lumps Fort as seen from the air in 1945

== Post-military use ==
The fort was bought by Portsmouth City Council in 1932. World War II interrupted plans to develop the site. In 1942, the Combined Operations Development Centre's Experimental Party, and soon after, the Royal Marine Boom Patrol Detachment, a specialist unit which also developed and trained in Sleeping Beauties and Boom Patrol Boats, began operations from the fort [latterly moving to Teignmouth, S.Devon]. The detachment was based in two Nissen huts outside the fort adjacent to the car park as well as within the fort itself, and initially trained in the Solent making almost daily canoe boom patrol paddles to the Isle of Wight. It went on to conduct Operation Frankton, on axis shipping at Bordeaux harbour.

After the war, it was planted as a rose garden, with the western part of the site becoming the Southsea Model Village

Adjacent to the site is the Canoe Lake, constructed from a large area of marshland, which was opened on 17 June 1886 and used as a boating lake. During World War II, the lake was used for experiments into countermeasures against magnetic mines

== See also ==
- Fortifications of Portsmouth

== Publications ==
- Moore, David, 2013. Portsmouth Lines and Southsea Defences, Solent Papers Number 12, David Moore, Gosport. ISBN 09570302-3-1

Next station upwards	Admiralty Semaphore line 1822	Next station downwards
Camp Down	Lumps Fort	HMNB Portsmouth
