= Compton Down, Compton =

Coordinates: 50.92872°N 0.91200°W

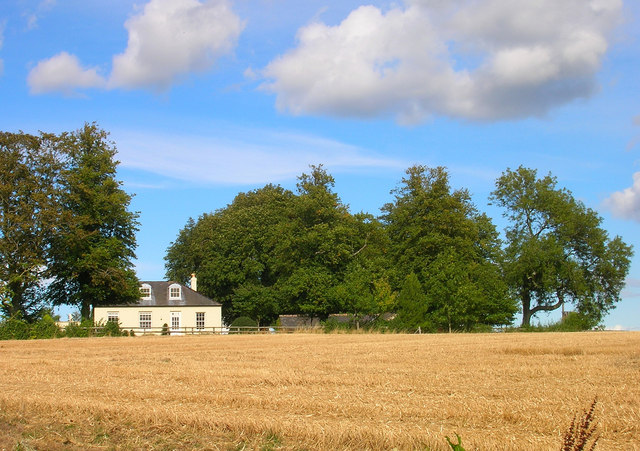
Telegraph House at Telegraph Hill Compton

Compton Down is an extent of high ground near Compton, West Sussex where there was an Admiralty semaphore station.

The semaphore station was built at Compton Down in 1821 and it operated on the semaphore line from London to Portsmouth between 1822 and 1847. The hill to the east of Compton on which the semaphore was built is now known as Telegraph Hill. The high ground to the west of Compton retains the name of Compton Down. Both hills rise to above 500 feet (150 m).

Next station upwards	Admiralty Semaphore line 1822	Next station downwards
Beacon Hill	Compton Down, Compton	Camp Down, Portsdown Hill
