= Portsdown Anticline =

Geological fold in Hampshire, England

The Portsdown Anticline is a north-facing geological fold of Tertiary age affecting rocks in Hampshire, southern England. This upfold of the local sedimentary rock sequence is paralleled by the Bere Forest/Chichester Syncline (downfold) about 2km to its north and a postulated deep fault to the north again. Further west, this major east-west structure adopts more of a NW - SE alignment. At the surface the Portsdown Anticline is seen to affect the Chalk rocks of Late Cretaceous age at Ports Down though it is known to also affect the underlying Jurassic strata.
