= Round Tower (Portsmouth) =

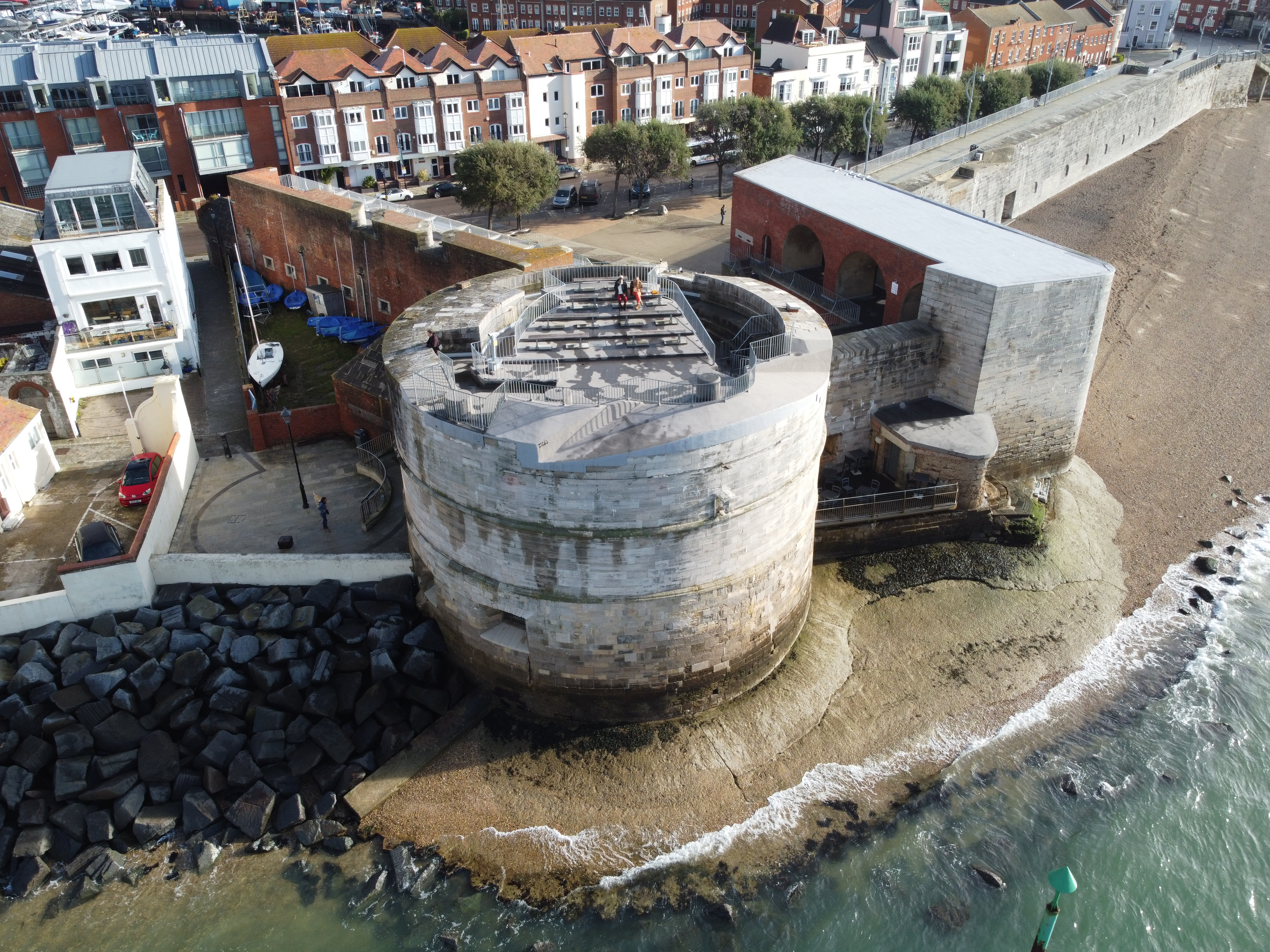

- Location within Hampshire
- 50°47.432′N 001°06.531′W
- Type: Fortification
- Location: Broad Street, Portsmouth
- OS grid reference: SZ 62911 99373

History
- Built: c.1490

Site notes
- Area: Hampshire
- Architectural style: Tudor
- Owner: Portsmouth City Council

Listed Building – Grade I
- Official name: The Round Tower
- Designated: 30 October 1969
- Reference no.: 1386901

The Round Tower is a fortification at the entrance to Portsmouth Harbour. It is a Grade I listed building.

== History ==
The site was originally occupied by a wooden tower before being replaced by a stone one.

=== The wooden tower ===
The wooden tower was built between 1418 and 1426 on the orders of King Henry V, or c1415.

In 1422, a defensive chain that could be raised in an emergency was built from the round tower across the harbour entrance.

=== The stone tower ===
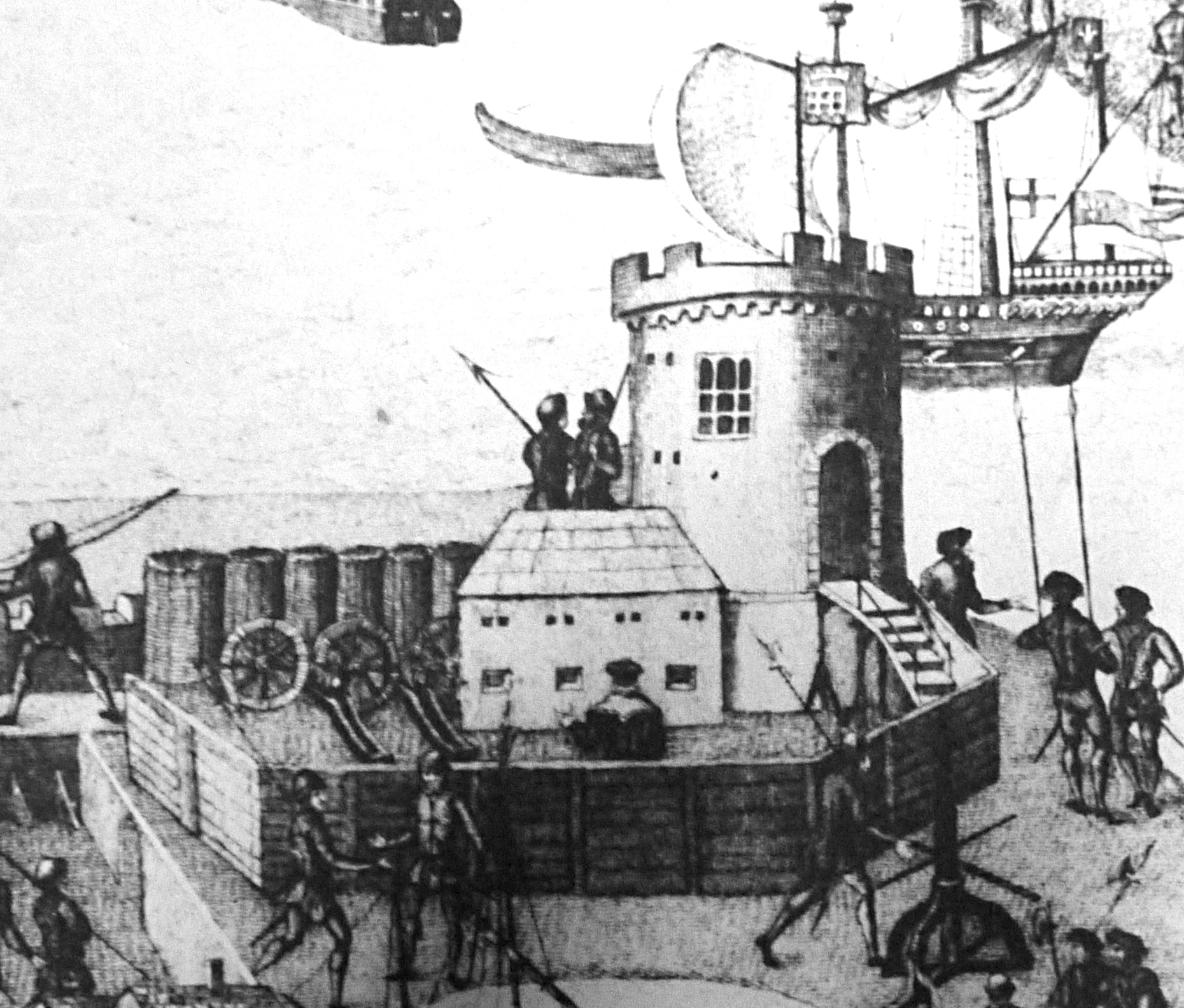
A depiction of how the round tower appeared in 1545

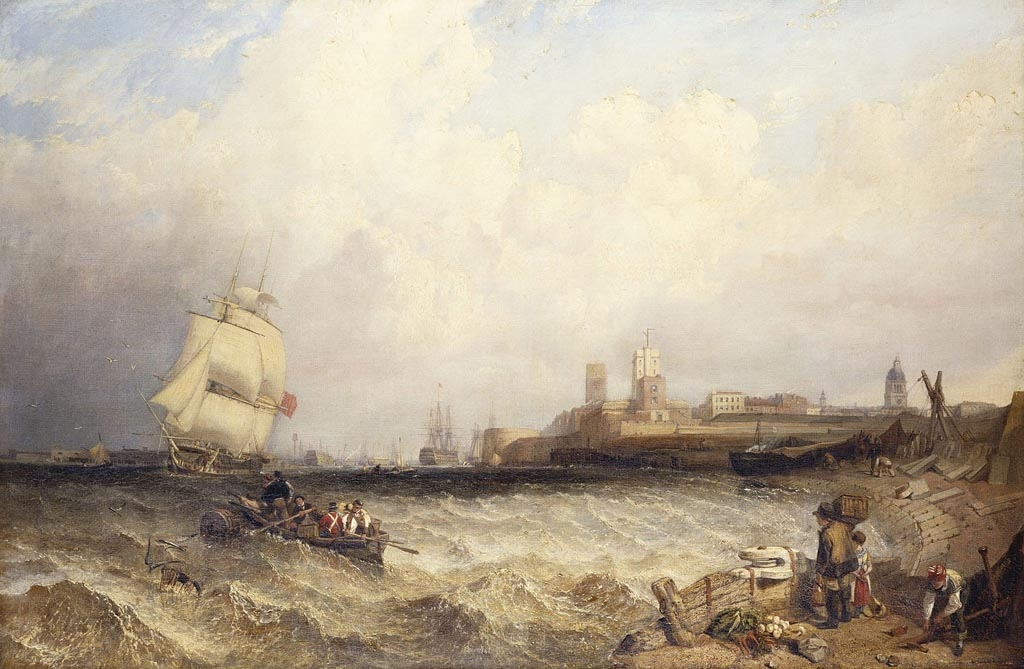
Portsmouth Harbour by Clarkson Stanfield, 1831. The Round Tower is visible in the centre along with other Portsmouth landmarks.

In the 1490s the tower was rebuilt in stone. In the 1680s a line of ramparts was added that connected the tower to the square tower. The upper section was later rebuilt during the Napoleonic Wars. Between 1847 and 1850 the roof of the tower was modified to serve as a gun platform. Portsmouth city council purchased the tower in 1958.

== See also ==
- Fortifications of Portsmouth
