= Hilsea Lines =

Fortifications near Portsmouth, England

Coordinates: 50°50′1″N 1°3′33″W

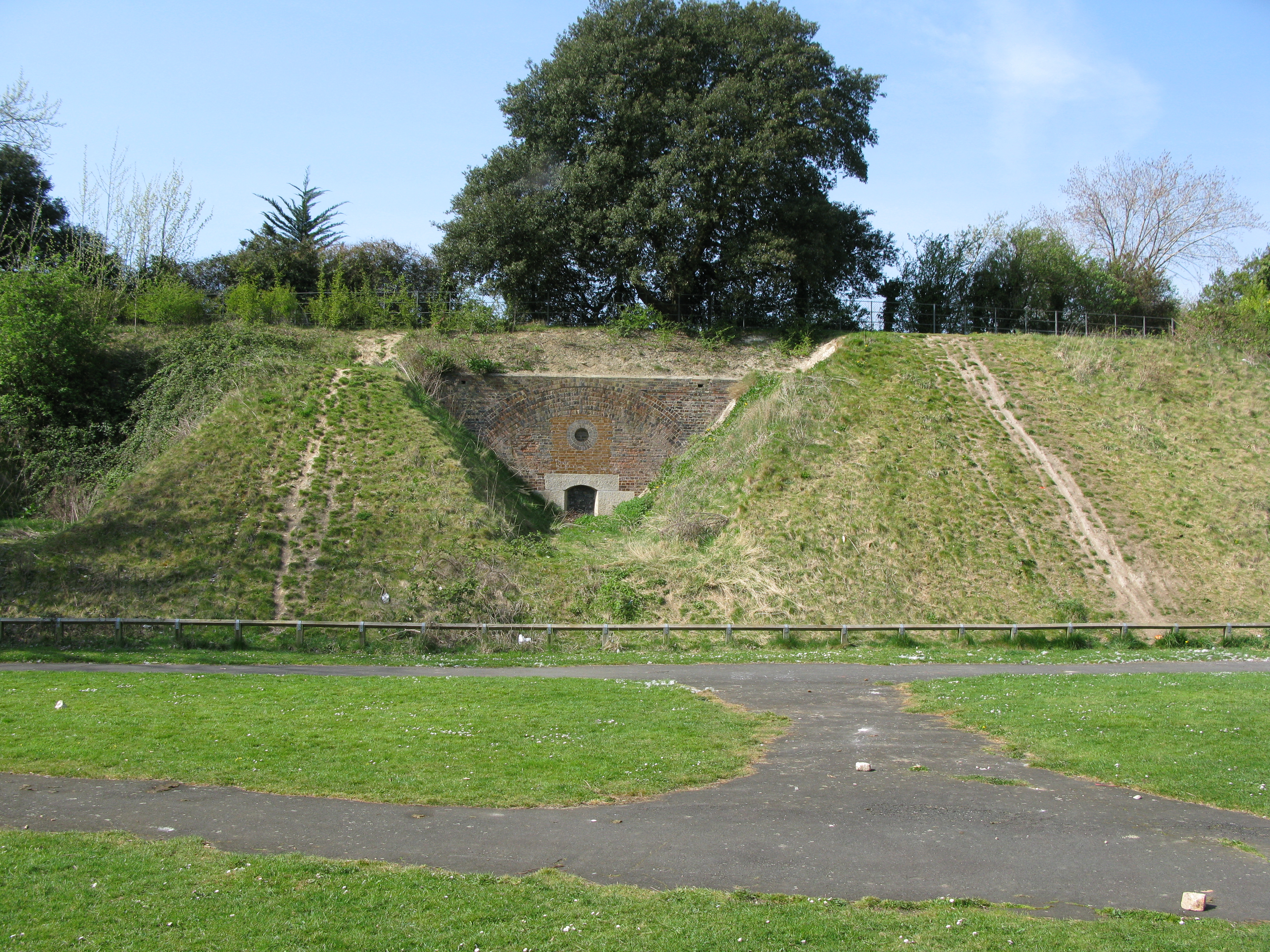
One of the emplacements in bastion 1 of the Hilsea Lines

The Hilsea Lines are a line of 18th- and 19th-century fortifications built at Hilsea to protect the northern approach to Portsea Island, an island off the southern coast of England which forms the majority of the city of Portsmouth and its key naval base. They are now used as a greenspace and leisure area, also known locally as Foxes Forest.

== Natural defences ==
The island is separated from the mainland by a narrow stretch of water called Portsbridge Creek. The first means of crossing the creek was by stepping stones, followed by a single track bridge, built to allow the passage of pedestrians and horse-drawn carts to have access to Portsea Island.

== Early defences ==
Early defences were focused on the 'Portsbridge' that crossed the creek. A fortification is thought to have been built at the mainland end of the bridge during the reign of King Henry VIII. In 1642 the fort was captured by parliamentary forces as part of the English Civil War. It was rebuilt in 1688 and again in 1746. During the Civil War further defences were constructed by the royalists consisting of a wooden barricade mounted on the bridge backed by a small fort equipped with 4 cannon. The cannon were withdrawn on 10 August 1642 and with the barricade held by as few as eight men the parliamentarian forces were able to cross the creek two days later. The Parliamentarians then constructed their own defences of at the site of the bridge consisting of two mounds on which a total of 6 cannon were mounted. The Parliamentarians appear to have constructed further defences near the bridge in 1643.

== The first lines ==
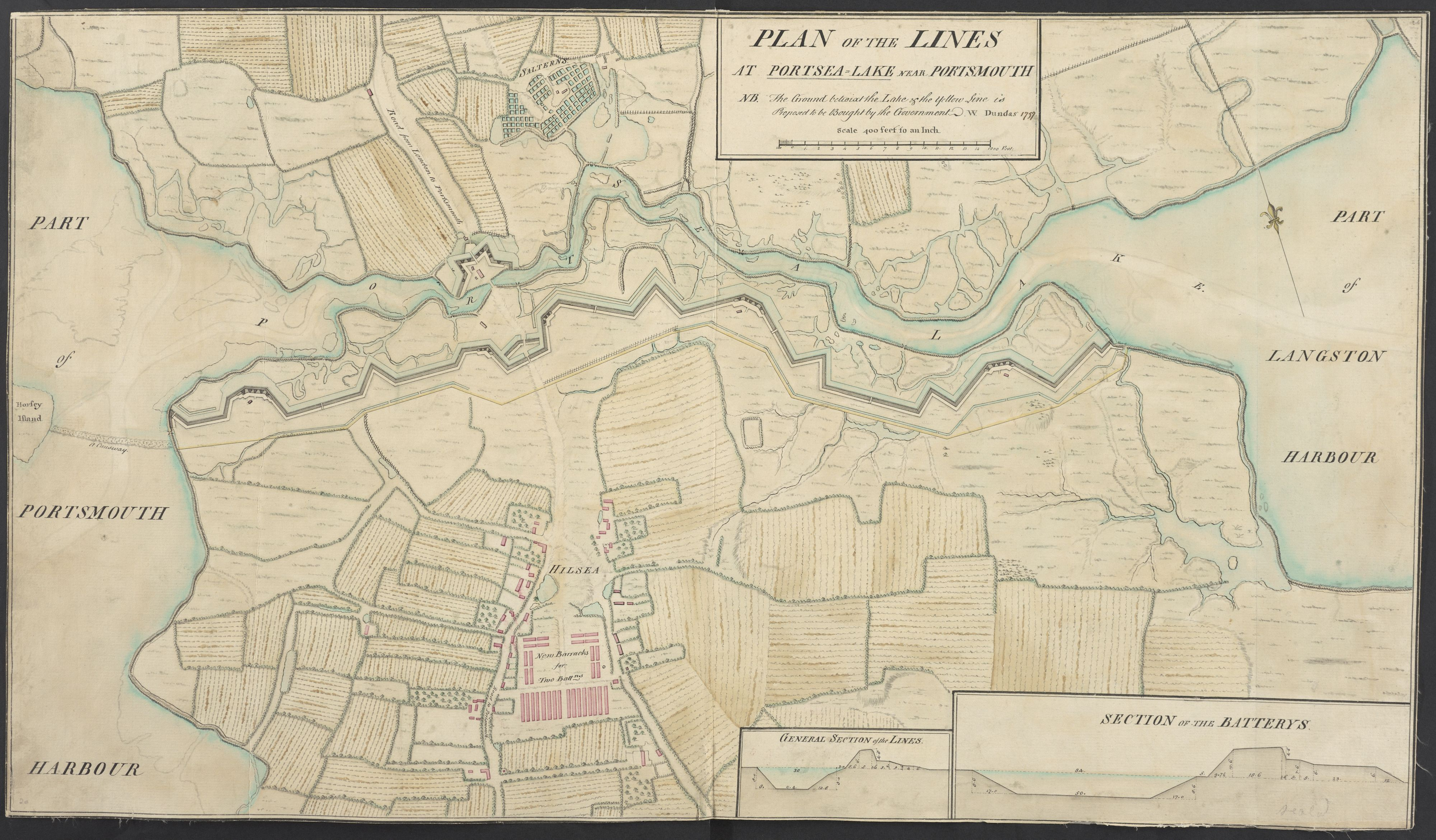
'Plan of the Lines at Portsea-Lake near Portsmouth', dated 1757.

During 1756 and 1757 defensive lines were constructed on the Portsea Island side of the creek under the supervision of John Peter Desmaretz. They consisted of a 15–20-foot-wide (4.6–6.1 m) and 6-foot-deep (1.8 m) ditch backed by a 7–8-foot (2.1–2.4 m) rampart. Water could be allowed to flow into the ditch from sluices at either end.

== The current lines ==
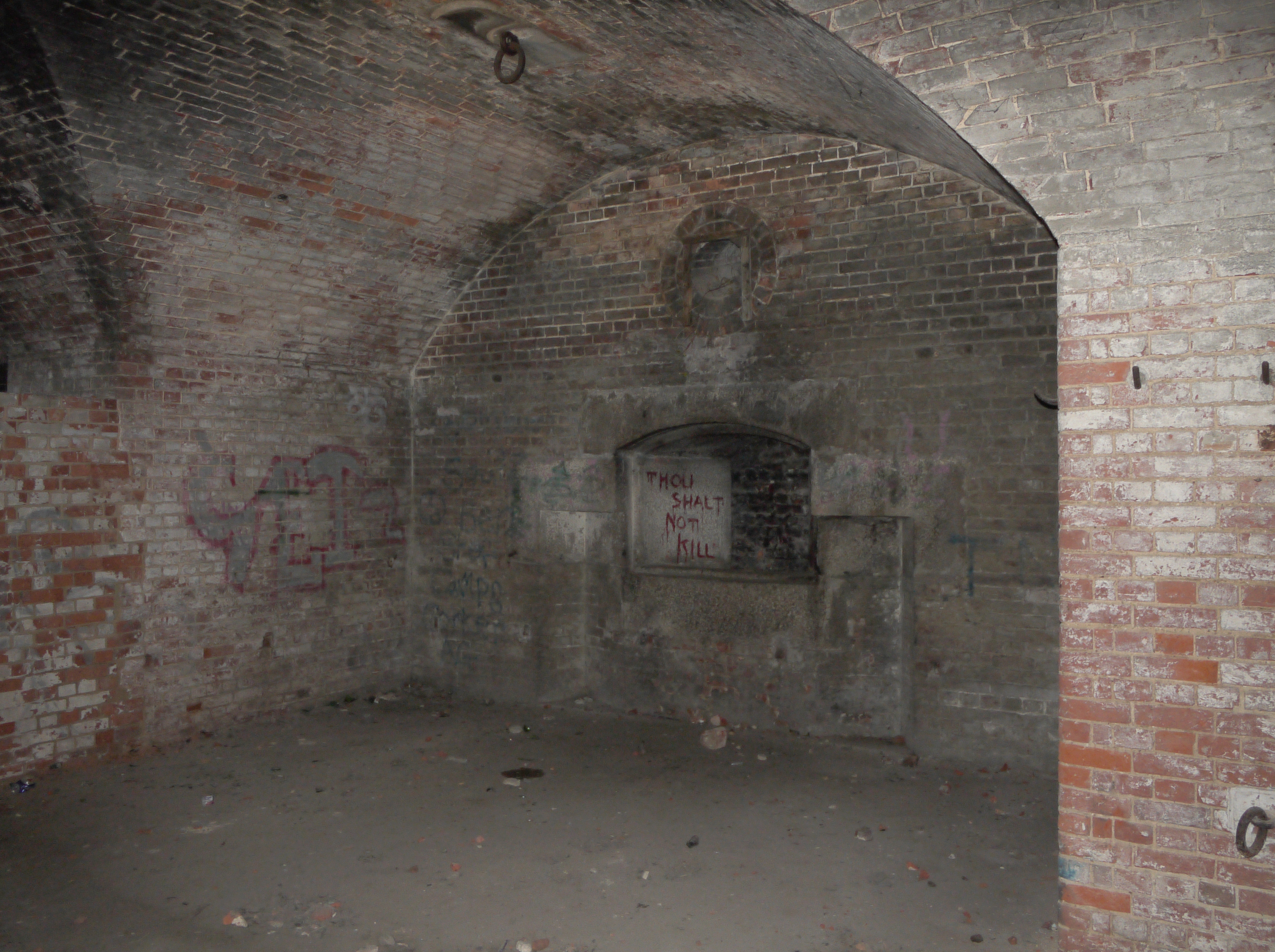
The inside of one of the Hilsea Lines' gun casements

The current lines were constructed between 1858 and 1871. They included special fortified bridges for road and rail access. A model of the Hilsea Lines featured in the 1862 International Exhibition. Even before their completion the Hilsea Lines had been rendered obsolete by the 1859 Royal Commission and advances in artillery technology; as such they were the last full bastioned trace constructed in the United Kingdom. The development of rifled artillery meant that it was now possible for an enemy to occupy the high ridge of Portsdown Hill north of Portsmouth and shell the naval base from several miles away without having to attack the Hilsea Lines. To counter the new threat a series of "Palmerston Forts" were constructed on Portsdown Hill and the Hilsea Lines were scaled back. In particular a pair of forts that it had been planned to place behind the lines were not constructed.

As completed, the lines are largely built from clay and chalk and were 30 feet (9.1 m) high when completed. Traffic on the London Road passed through the lines via a pair of 15-foot-wide (4.6 m), 18-foot-high (5.5 m) tunnels. There was also an 8-foot-wide (2.4 m), 11-foot-high (3.4 m) tunnel for pedestrians. The section containing the tunnels was demolished in 1919.

Then a further tunnel through the lines was provided for the railway. Finally, a 6-foot-wide (1.8 m) and 8-foot-high (2.4 m) tunnel was built through the West centre curtain to act as a sally port.

It was originally planned to equip the lines with smoothbore guns; however, it appears the guns may never have been fitted. In 1886 the lines were equipped with a mix of RML 7 inch guns and RBL 7 inch Armstrong guns on Moncrieff mountings fitted in newly constructed concrete emplacements. Further RBL 7 inch Armstrong guns were fitted in the original casements. The guns were removed in 1903. A QF 6 pounder Hotchkiss was mounted on the lines during World War 1. A small number of guns were mounted on the lines during World War II.

== Post military use ==
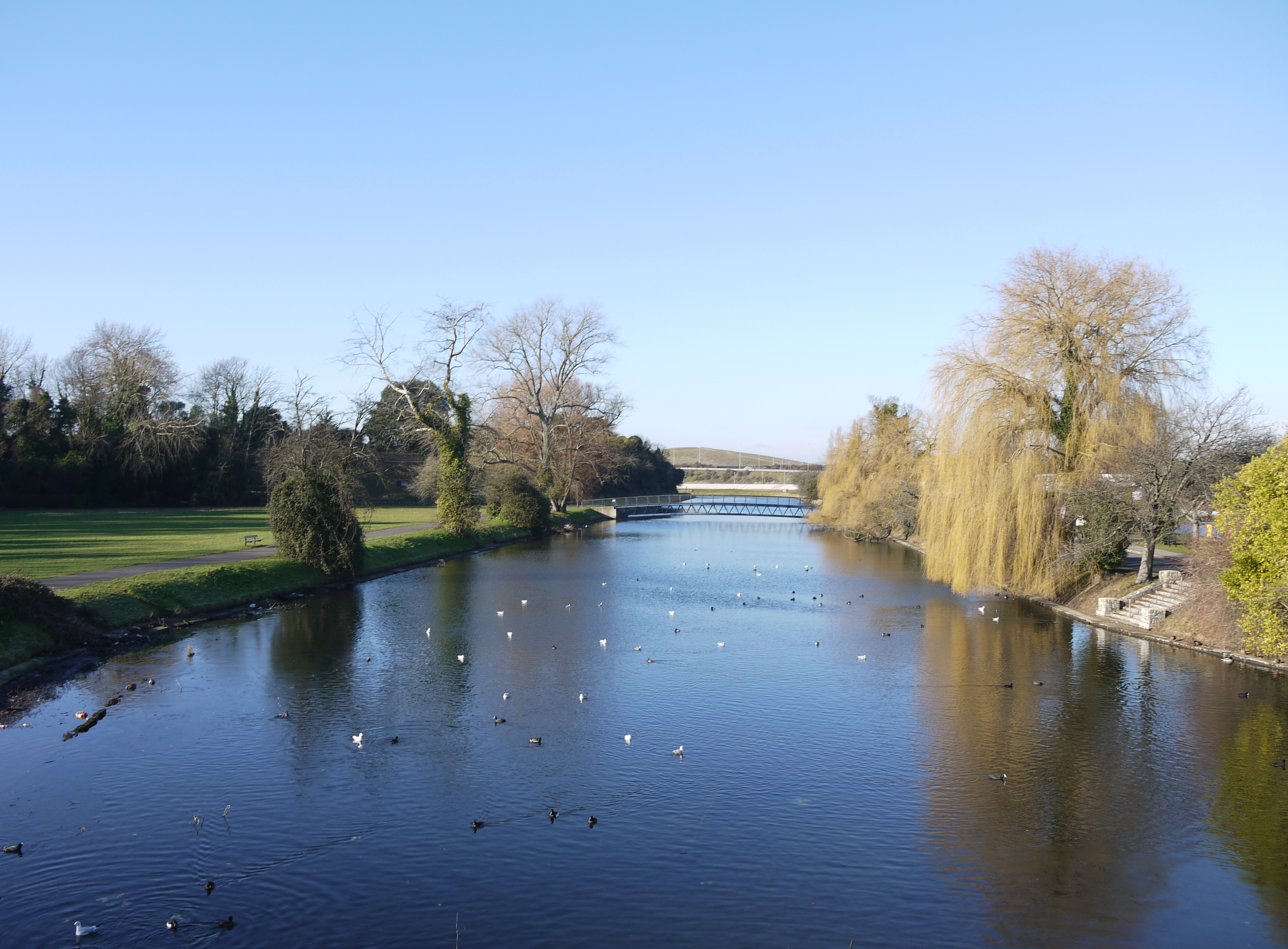
A section of the moat that used form part of Hilsea lagoon

When the lines were built large amounts of land was purchased by the crown to the rear of the lines. Part of this land behind the west bastion was sold to the city of Portsmouth in 1926 which built a housing estate, a school and a recreation ground on it. During 1929 and 1930 the city purchased the east bastion, the curtain wall and the land behind them. This land was used as the site for a new road link to the mainland and Portsmouth Airport. At the same time the city also purchased the West Bastion. In 1932, the eastern lines were dynamited to make room for the airport.

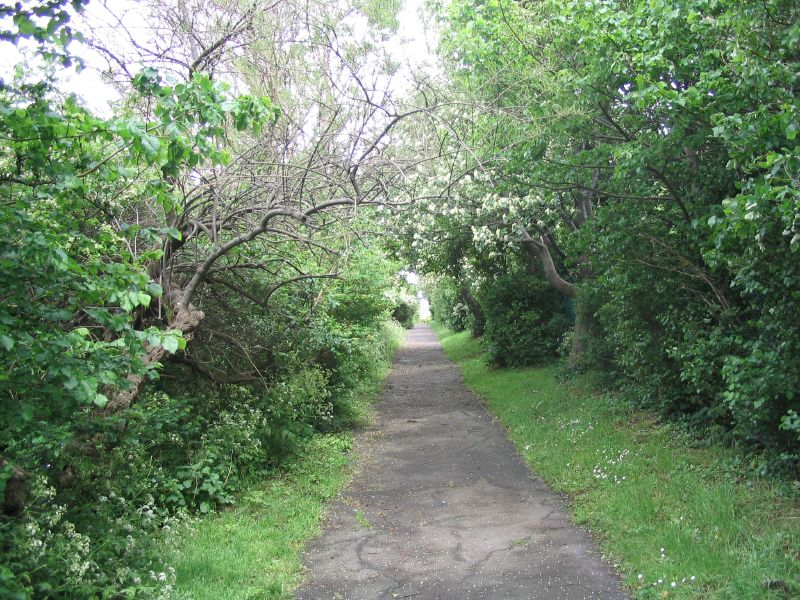
One of the more accessible parts of the Hilsea Lines path

In the 1930s western end of the moat became known as the Hilsea lagoon and in the mid-1930s work was done on the banks and it was turned into a boating lake. In the same period the land between the boating lake and the lines was converted into part of the Hilsea bastion gardens. Most of the gardens were destroyed as the result of road widening in 1968–70. In 1986 the city bought those parts of the lines that were not already under its control. The terraces that formed part of the gardens were demolished in 2000. In 1938 a bridge was built across the boating lake section of the moat. It was demolished in 1999 and later replaced by the current structure.

Today the lines are accessible for most of their length, but overgrown and derelict in places. The moat is used for fishing. In May 2006 the moat experienced some flooding. Most of the lines are designated as a scheduled monument.

The remaining bastions have various uses:

- Bastion 1 is owned and occupied by The Portsmouth Grammar School. It is used as changing rooms for the playing fields in Hilsea.
- Bastion 3 is home to Portsmouth City Council's countryside ranger for the area, and is also used by volunteer groups.
- Bastion 4 is occupied by Casemates Studios and Cafe.. They have seven rehearsal studios, recording facilities alongside a cafe and music venue.
- Bastion 5 is in a derelict state and is listed on the Heritage At Risk Register maintained by Historic England. Any future restoration work is complicated by the lack of road access to the bastion.
- Bastion 6 is home to the WW1 Remembrance Centre, which relocated from nearby Fort Widley.

The nature reserve at Hilsea Lines has in recent decades become locally known as Foxes Forest. There are two walking routes around the area, which explore the nature and history of Hilsea Lines.

== See also ==
- Fortifications of Portsmouth
- Hilsea
