= Square Tower =

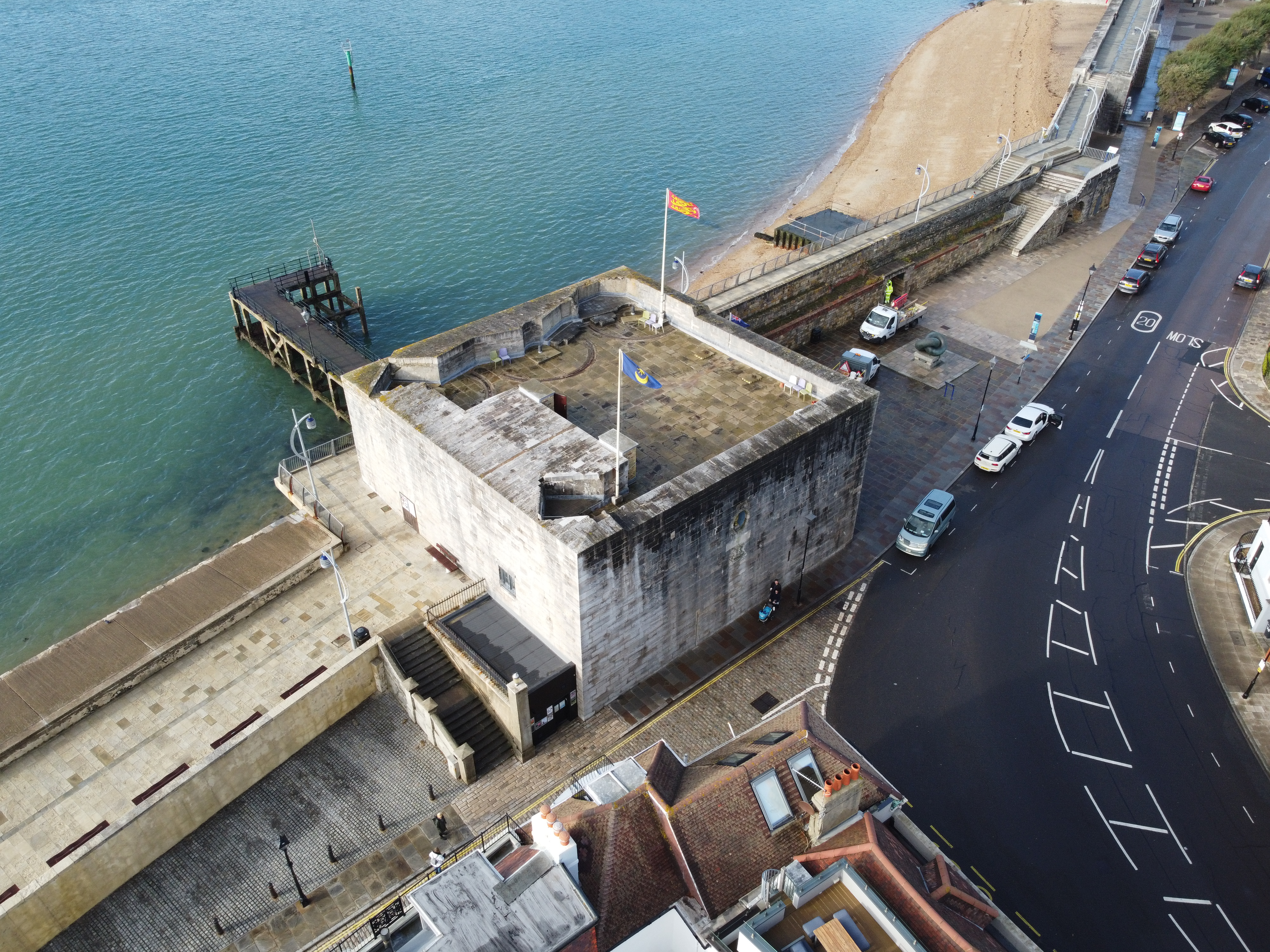

- Location within Hampshire
- 50°47′22″N 1°06′24″W
- Type: Fortification
- Location: Broad Street Portsmouth
- OS grid reference: SZ 63076 99247

History
- Built: 1494

Site notes
- Area: Hampshire
- Owner: Portsmouth City Council

Listed Building – Grade I
- Official name: The Square Tower
- Designated: 30 Oct 1969
- Reference no.: 1386904

The Square Tower is one of the oldest parts of the fortifications of Portsmouth, England. It is a Grade I listed building.

== History ==
The Square Tower (centre right) viewed from the saluting platform in 1836; beyond it, the Round Tower and HMS Britannia (centre left).

A tower was built in 1494 as part of the fortifications and served as a home to the Governor of Portsmouth.

In 1584, it was converted to a gunpowder store, the governor having moved to a residence next to the Garrison Church. At the time of the royalist surrender of Portsmouth at the end of the Siege of Portsmouth during the English Civil War 1200 barrels of gunpowder were stored in the tower; the royalists were able to use the threat of detonating the store as a bargaining chip during the negotiations leading up to the surrender.

From 1676 Pierson's Wharf, at the northern tip of The Point, was leased to the Board of Ordnance to serve as a gun wharf (where naval cannons and other items were stored for easy loading on to ships, which could moor nearby). This led to gunpowder barrels routinely being rolled the length of the cobbled roads of The Point, between the tower and the wharf, inevitably leading to a certain amount of spillage. A wharf, known as the powder bridge, was built with access directly from the tower, allowing the barrels to be loaded onto ships moored alongside the wharf. In the 1690s an additional magazine (the 'New Magazine') was built on a triangular promontory on the east side of The Camber. All these locations were alongside built-up areas, and concerns about the hazards of an explosion led to calls for Portsmouth's gunpowder stores to be relocated.

In 1779, the gunpowder having been relocated to Priddy's Hard, the Square Tower was given to the Victualling Board to serve as a Royal Navy meat store, remaining as such until 1850, when this function was moved to the new Victualling Yard complex at Gosport.

In 1823, the Board of Admiralty installed a semaphore tower on the roof, the first link in a signalling chain running between the Royal Dockyard and The Admiralty in London. Following the introduction of the electrical telegraph, the semaphore tower was demolished in 1848.

The tower was manned during both World Wars. It was purchased by Portsmouth City Council in 1958–1960.

=== Bust of Charles I ===
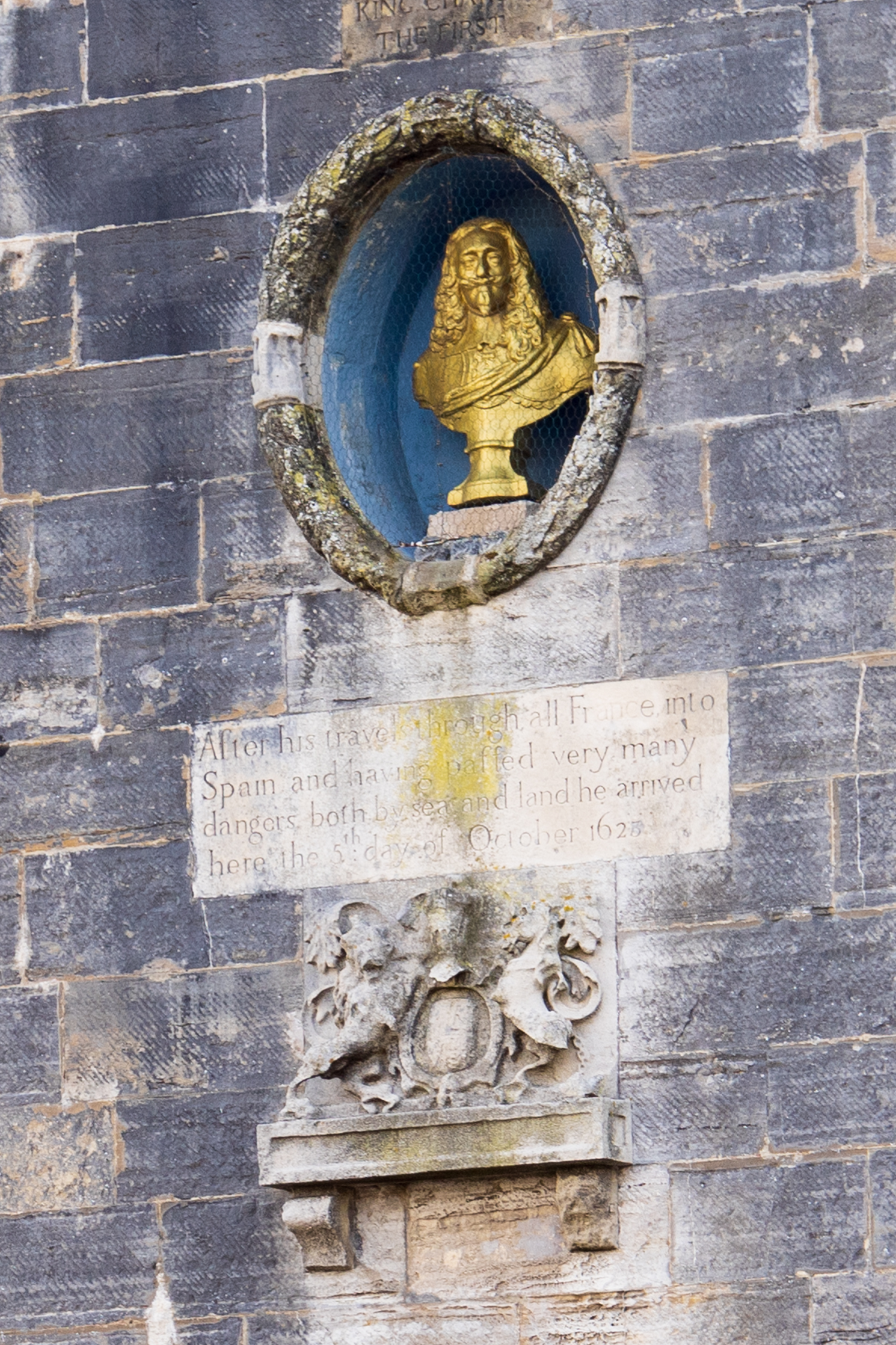
The bust of Charles I on the east wall of the Square Tower

In a niche on the east wall is a bust of Charles I by Hubrecht le Sueur. The original was presented to the city by the King to commemorate his safe arrival from his trip to France and Spain in 1623. There is the following inscription below the Royal coat of arms: "After his travels through all France into Spain and having passed very many dangers both by sea and land he arrived here the 5th day of October 1623". The bust now on display is a 20th-century copy, the original is in the city museum.

== Present day ==
The Square Tower is now used for hosting functions such as weddings, christenings and funerals. It also hosts regular tea rooms and markets. During the Australian bi-centenary celebrations in 1987 it hosted an exhibition on the First Fleet.

Scott Doonican from the comedy folk band The Bar-Steward Sons of Val Doonican performed at the Square Tower on 14 May 2023. He returned in 2024 and 2025.

== See also ==
- Fortifications of Portsmouth
