= Portsdown Hill =

Ridge in Hampshire, England

Coordinates: 50.85822°N 1.11055°W

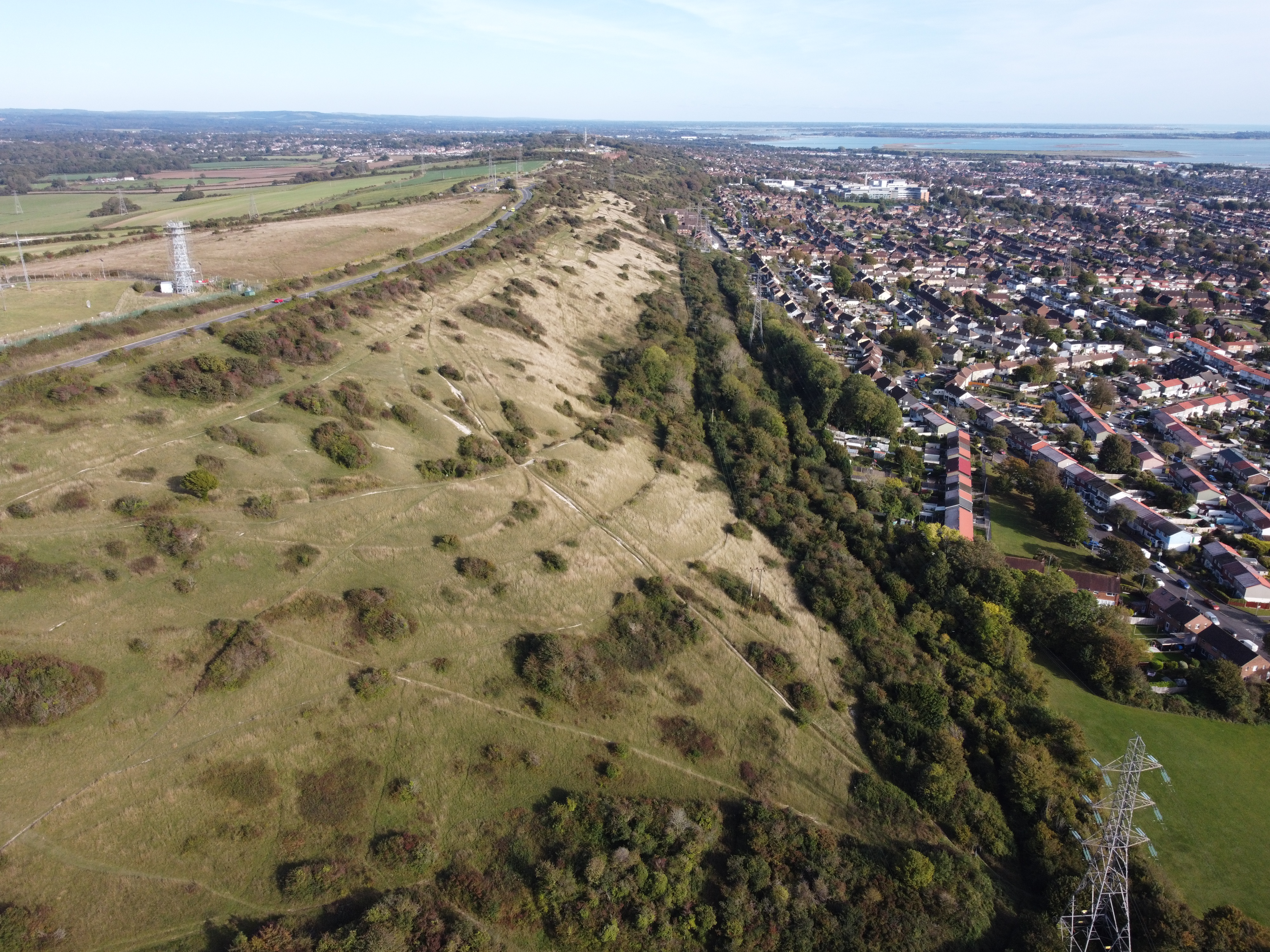
- Southward slope of Portsdown Hill

Highest point
- Elevation: 131 m (430 ft)
- Listing: County Top

Geography
- Location: Hampshire, England
- OS grid: SU627069
- Topo map: OS Landranger 196

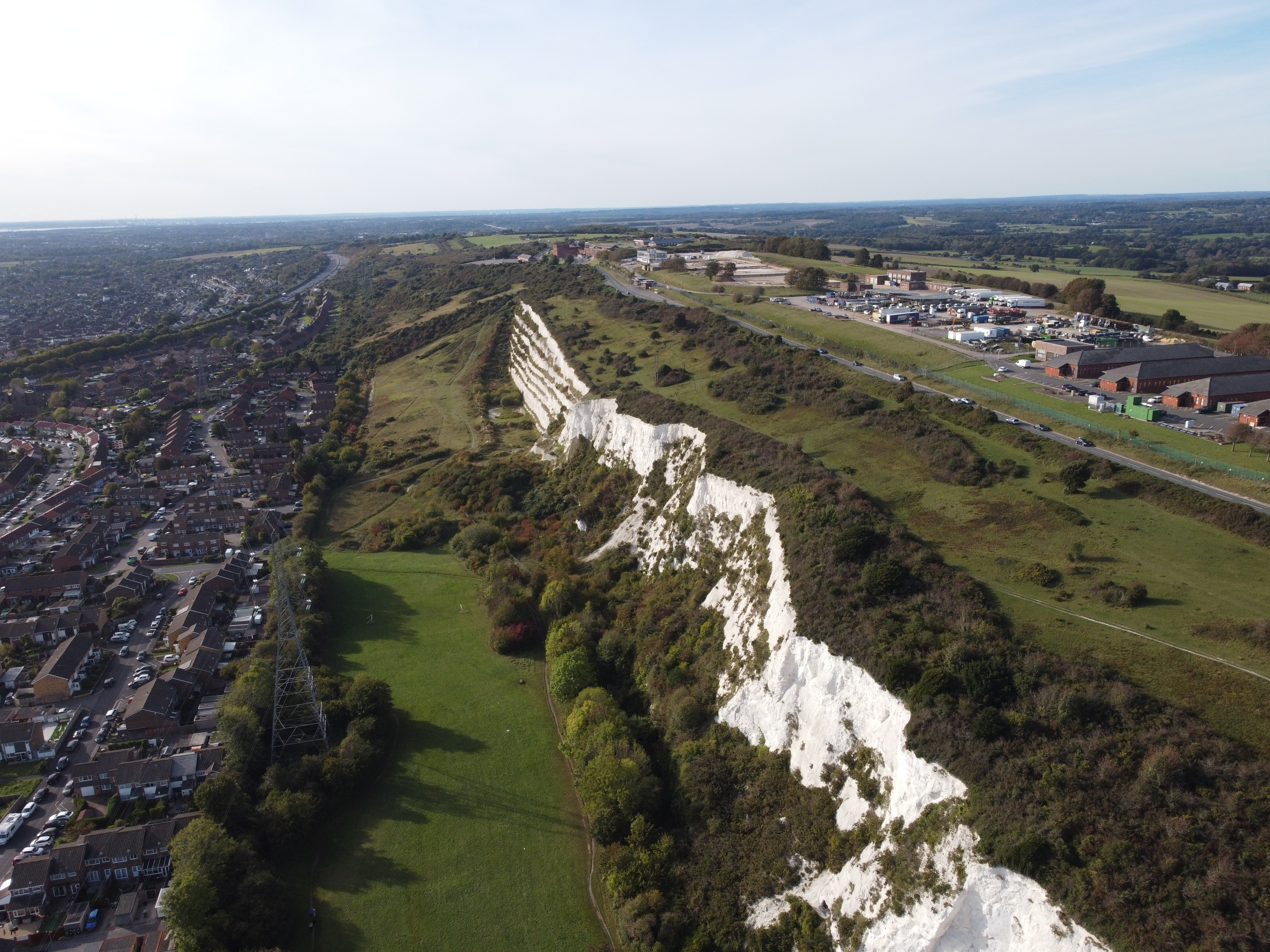
The cliffs of Paulsgrove Chalk Pit are a familiar site in Portsmouth

Portsdown Hill is a long chalk ridge in Hampshire, England. The highest point of the hill lies within Fort Southwick at 131 m above sea level. The ridge offers good views to the south over Portsmouth, the Solent, Hayling Island and Gosport, with the Isle of Wight beyond. The hill is on the mainland, just to the north of Portsea Creek, which separates the mainland from Portsea Island, on which lies the main part of the city of Portsmouth, one of the United Kingdom's main naval bases. To the north lies the Forest of Bere, with the South Downs visible in the distance. Butser Hill can be seen on a clear day. The hill is formed from an inlier of chalk which has been brought to the surface by an east–west upfold of the local strata known as the Portsdown Anticline.

Southwick House is close by the north side of the hill, the HQ for U.S. General Dwight D. Eisenhower during the D-Day invasions; the generals prayed together before D-Day at Christ Church Portsdown, on the hill, which has a memorial window. The A3(M) motorway cuts through the east side of the hill while the original A3 climbs over the centre by the George Inn pub and Christ Church. The nearest railway stations (from west to east) are Portchester, Cosham and Bedhampton. There are many stories about real and imagined tunnels in the hill. The area contains active military research establishments, including one of the core sites of Dstl (known as Dstl Portsdown West) and sites run by QinetiQ. Part of the hill has been designated a Site of Special Scientific Interest. Most of the southern flank of the ridge is designated as access land under the Countryside and Rights of Way Act 2000 and thereby freely available for the public to enjoy on foot.

During the early part of the English Civil War, Royalist forces from Portsmouth were involved in a number of skirmishes with Parliamentarians on the hill.

Discontinuance of Portsdown Fair, Southampton Act 1862
- Act of Parliament
- Parliament of the United Kingdom
- Long title: An Act for the Discontinuance of Portsdown Fair in the County of Southampton.
- Citation: 25 & 26 Vict. c. 34
- Territorial extent: United Kingdom

Dates
- Royal assent: 7 July 1862
- Commencement: 7 July 1862 (Note: Section 1.)
- Repealed: 16 November 1989
Other legislation
Repealed by	Statute Law (Repeals) Act 1989

Status: Repealed

Text of statute as originally enacted

From 1716 until the hill was taken over for defence purposes in the 1860s, the hill was home to a fair on Easter Mondays.

== Portsdown Forts ==
The forts on Portsdown Hill were built as a result of the 1859 Royal Commission on the Defence of the United Kingdom, as part of a series of fortifications, collectively known as the Palmerston Forts, built to defend HMNB Portsmouth (5 miles (8.0 km) away) from a possible attack from inland, as the development of rifled gun barrels made it possible for an invading army to land elsewhere, circle around to the top of the hill and bombard the city from there, rendering the existing Hilsea Lines at the bottom of the ridge useless. A series of six forts were planned along the 10 km (6.2 mi) of the ridge. From west to east they are forts Fareham, Wallington, Nelson, Southwick, Widley and Purbrook. The line was finished off at the eastern end with Crookhorn Redoubt and Farlington Redoubt. The main threat was perceived to be from Napoleon III of France, but this receded soon after the forts' completion. Due to this they became known as "Palmerston's Folly" but, though never needed for their original purpose, were useful anti-aircraft gun emplacements during World War II.

Fort Fareham is now a small industrial estate. The remains of the fort are grade II listed.

Fort Wallington has been largely demolished to make way for an industrial estate. What remains is now a grade II listed building.

Fort Nelson has been extensively restored as an artillery museum run by the Royal Armouries. It is a grade I listed building, the highest level of designation.

Fort Southwick was for many years an Admiralty Research Establishment, sold in 2003 for housing. It is also now a grade I listed building.

Fort Widley is owned by Portsmouth council, hosting a stable and various community rooms. Tours run on summer weekends. It is grade II* listed.

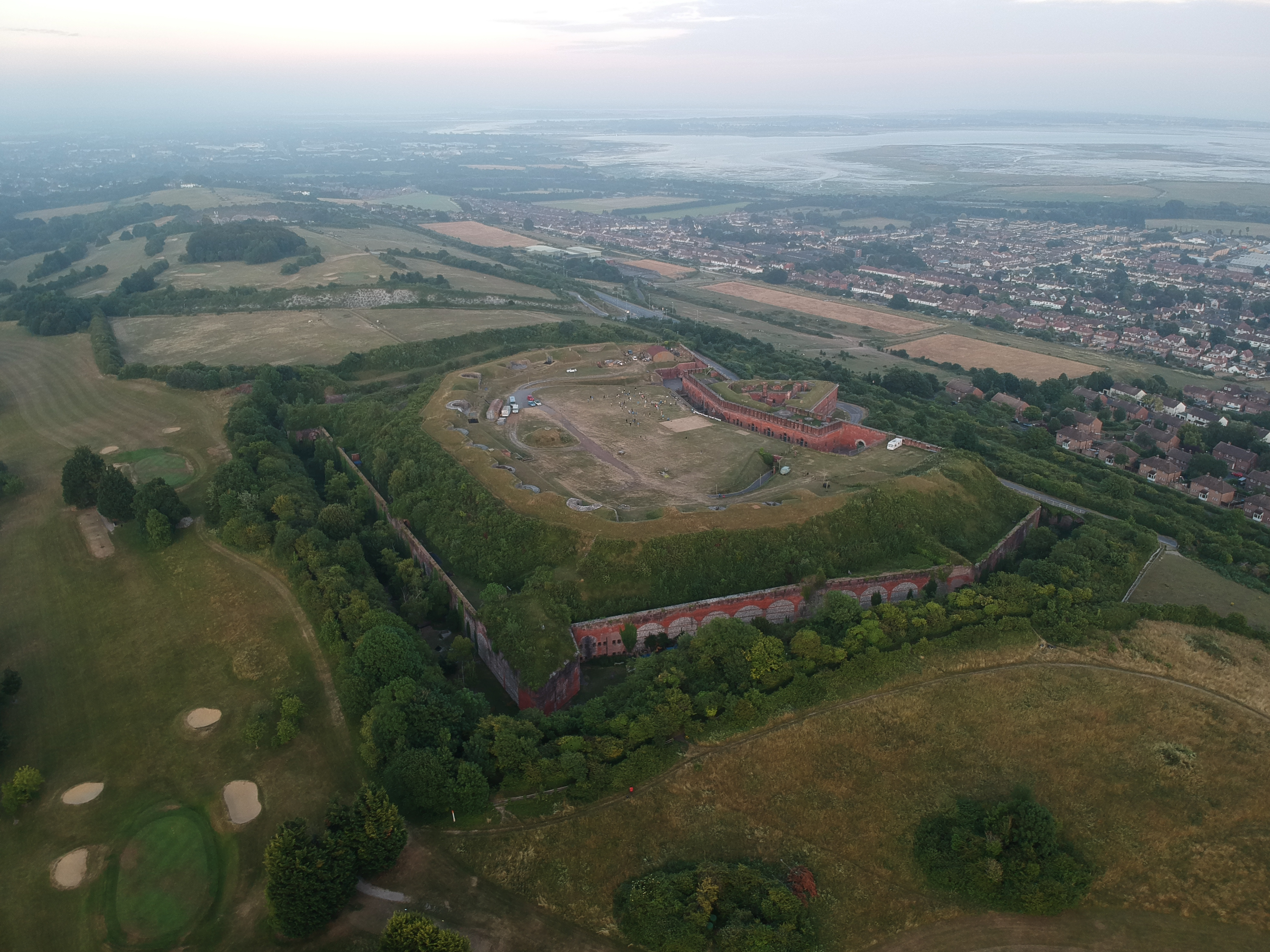
Fort Purbrook, Portsdown Hill, Portsmouth

Fort Purbrook is open occasionally for craft fairs. It is also home to an activity centre which offers (but is not limited to) archery, rifle shooting and indoor rock-climbing. It is also grade II* listed. The fort was the site for Tommy's Holiday Camp in the Who's 1975 film. In October 2021, the fort was one of 142 sites across England to receive part of a £35-million injection into the government's Culture Recovery Fund.

Guarding Fort Purbrook, the Crookhorn redoubt suffered from subsidence, and was demolished by 1876. The Farlington redoubt had only the ditches and gun positions dug, and was finally demolished in the 1970s. The tunnel between Crookhorn and Purbrook has been rediscovered.

Portsdown also gave its name to an army estate in Singapore. Long after the British army moved out in 1967, the Portsdown estate continues to thrive, with Portsdown Road the main road running through the middle.

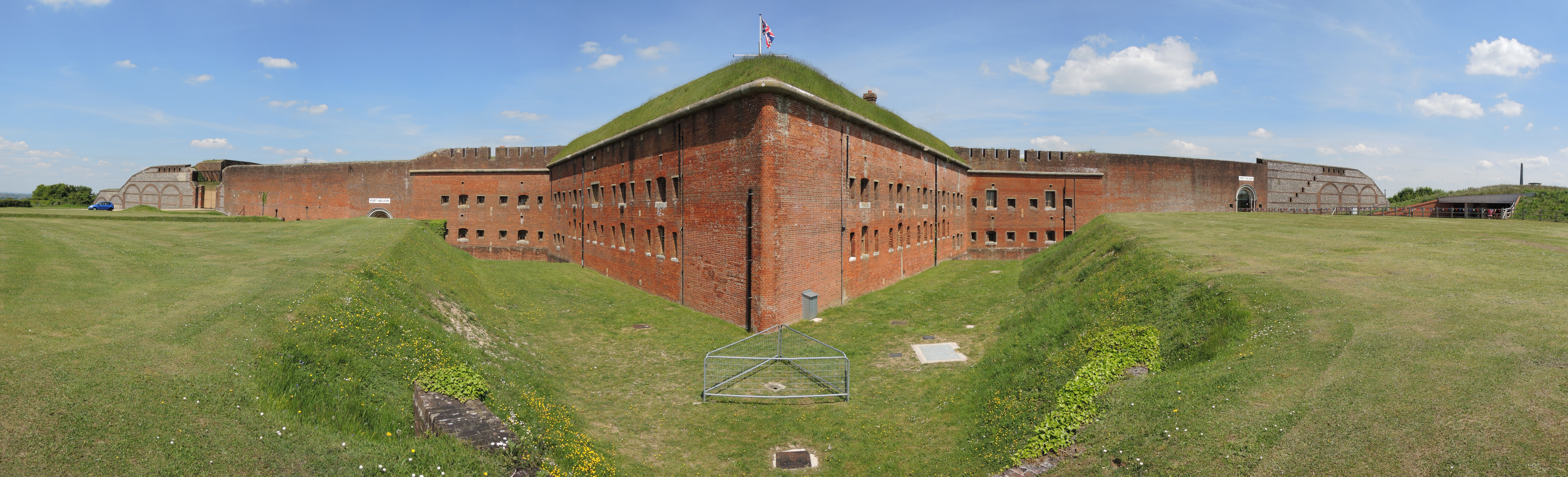
Part of the defences of Fort Nelson

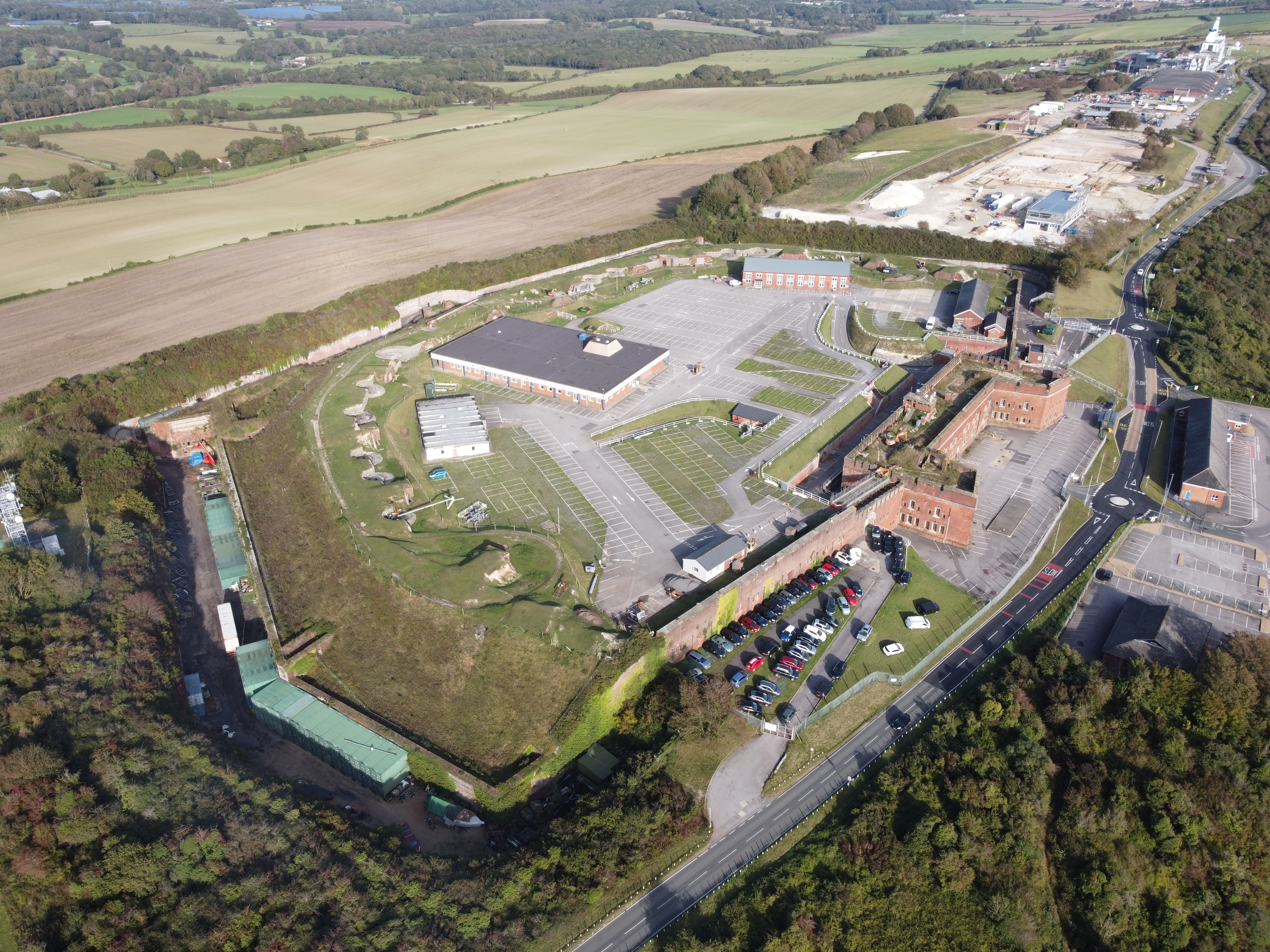
Fort Southwick, Portsdown Hill, Portsmouth

== Portsdown SSSI ==
Over fifty hectares of the south face of the hill are a Site of Special Scientific Interest owing to its chalk grassland habitat. Grazing ceased in the early 1950s, and consequently the site was gradually invaded by scrub, mostly hawthorn, dogwood, and wild privet. An intensive restoration programme funded by the Countryside Commission and Portsmouth City Council was initiated in 1995; large areas of scrub have now been cleared by machine, and flowers and grasses allowed to regenerate naturally. Scrub re-encroachment is controlled by cattle and horses which graze overwinter.

Several species of butterfly became extinct owing to the loss of habitat to scrub, notably the Adonis blue, silver-studded blue, dingy skipper, and dark green fritillary. Others such as the chalkhill blue and small blue were at the brink of extinction, but are now flourishing again. Indeed, the hill has now probably the largest metapopulation of the small blue in the UK.

== Portsdown Technology Park ==
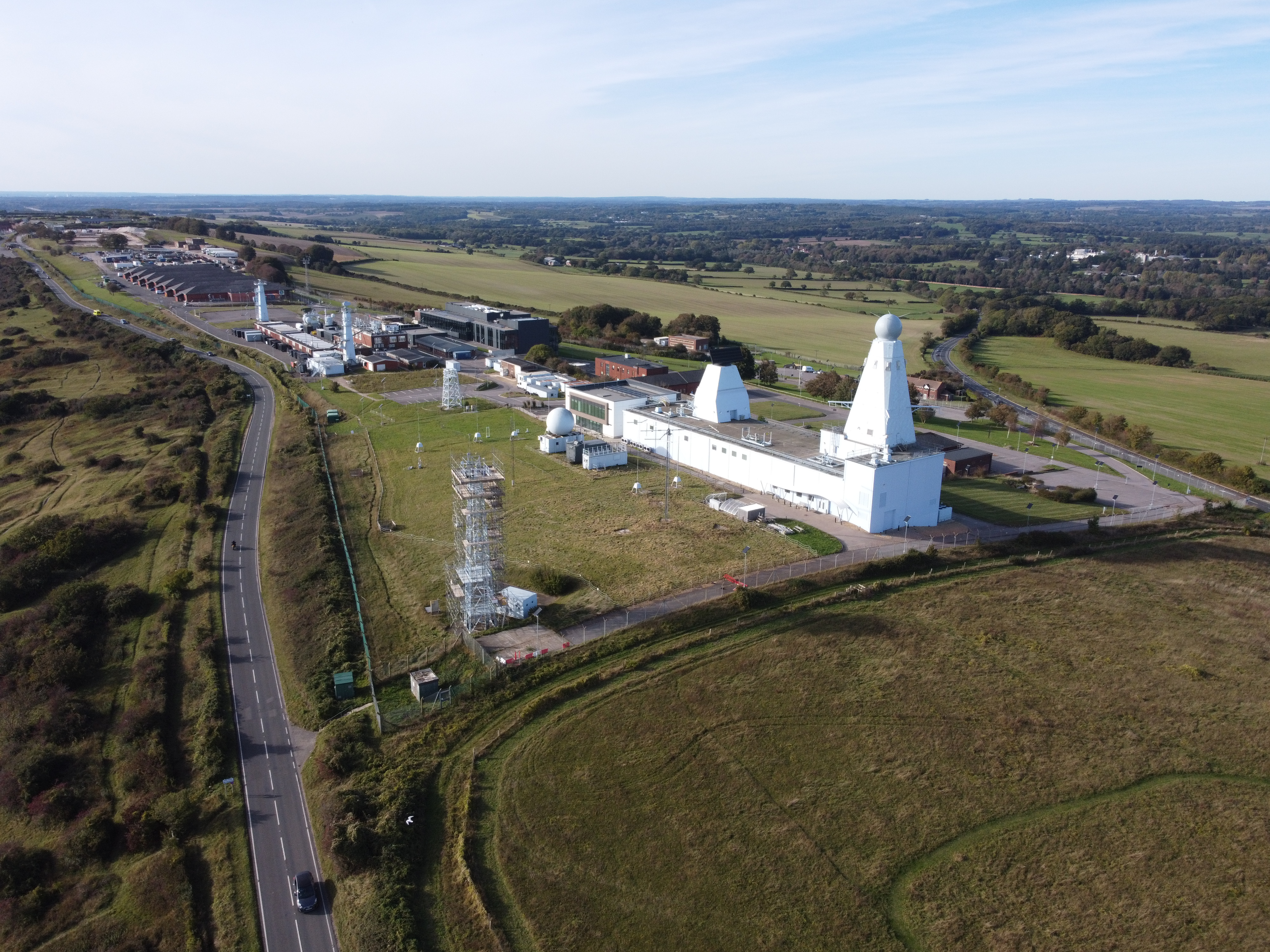
Portsdown Technology Park

Portsdown Technology Park is located near Fort Southwick on Portsdown Hill. It is home to a number of defense companies including Qinetiq and BAE Systems. Within the park is a building featuring radar towers similar to a Type 45 destroyer, which are visible to a wide area of Hampshire. The site is the former home of the Admiralty Surface Weapons Establishment. DSTL has a smaller site situated to the west of Fort Southwick.
