= Telegraph Hill =

A telegraph hill is a hill or other natural elevation that is chosen as part of an optical telegraph system.

Telegraph Hill may also refer to:

== England ==
- A high point in the Haldon Hills, Devon
- Telegraph Hill, Dorset, a hill in the Dorset Downs
- A hill in the Chalk Downs of Hampshire
- Telegraph Hill, Hertfordshire, a nature reserve
- Telegraph Hill (ward), an electoral ward in Lewisham, London
- Telegraph Hill, Barnet, in Childs Hill, a ward of the London Borough of Barnet
- Telegraph Hill, Lewisham, a conservation area in London
- Telegraph Hill in Claygate, a suburban village in Surrey
- Telegraph Hill, Sussex, a hill of West Sussex

== United States ==
- Telegraph Hill, San Francisco, a hill and neighborhood in San Francisco, California
- Telegraph Hill (Dukes County, Massachusetts), an elevation in Massachusetts
- Telegraph Hill (Hull, Massachusetts), a historic site in Plymouth County
- Telegraph Hill (Provincetown, Massachusetts), an elevation in Barnstable County
- Telegraph Hill (Sandwich, Massachusetts), an elevation in Barnstable County
- Telegraph Hill (South Boston, Massachusetts), an elevation in Suffolk County
- Telegraph Hill (Woods Hole, Massachusetts), an elevation in Barnstable County
