= Għaxaq Semaphore Tower =

- It-Torri tas-Semaforu ta' Ħal Għaxaq
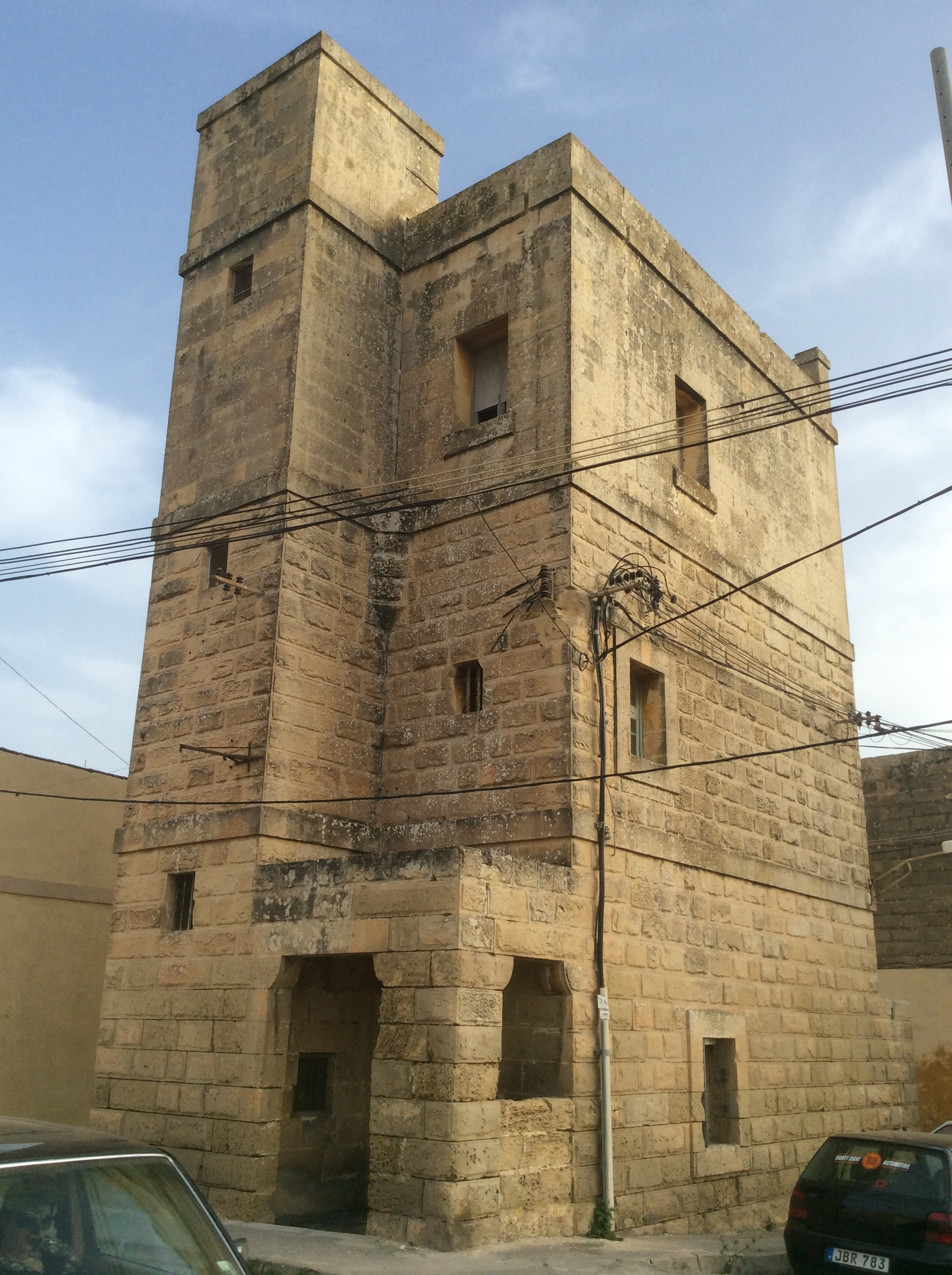
- View of Għaxaq Semaphore Tower
- Alternative names: It-Turretta

General information
- Status: Intact
- Type: Semaphore tower
- Location: Għaxaq, Malta
- Coordinates: 35°50′50.2″N 14°30′53.1″E
- Completed: 1848

Technical details
- Material: Limestone
- Floor count: 3

The Għaxaq Semaphore Tower (Maltese: It-Torri tas-Semaforu ta' Ħal Għaxaq), known locally as it-Turretta (the turret), is a semaphore tower in the town of Għaxaq, Malta. It was built by the British in 1848, as one of three semaphore towers in Malta. The tower is now leased to the Għaxaq Local Council, which plans to restore it.

== History ==
The semaphore telegraph system was invented in 1792, and the British military authorities began to consider installing such a system in Malta in the early 1840s. Initially, it was planned that semaphore stations would be established on the bell towers and domes of the island's churches, but the religious authorities rejected the proposal. Due to this, in 1848 new semaphore towers were constructed at Għaxaq and Għargħur on the main island of Malta, and another was built at Ta' Kenuna in Nadur, Gozo. Further stations were established at the Governor's Palace in Valletta, Selmun Palace near Mellieħa, and the Giordan Lighthouse near Għasri, Gozo. Each station was staffed by the Royal Engineers.

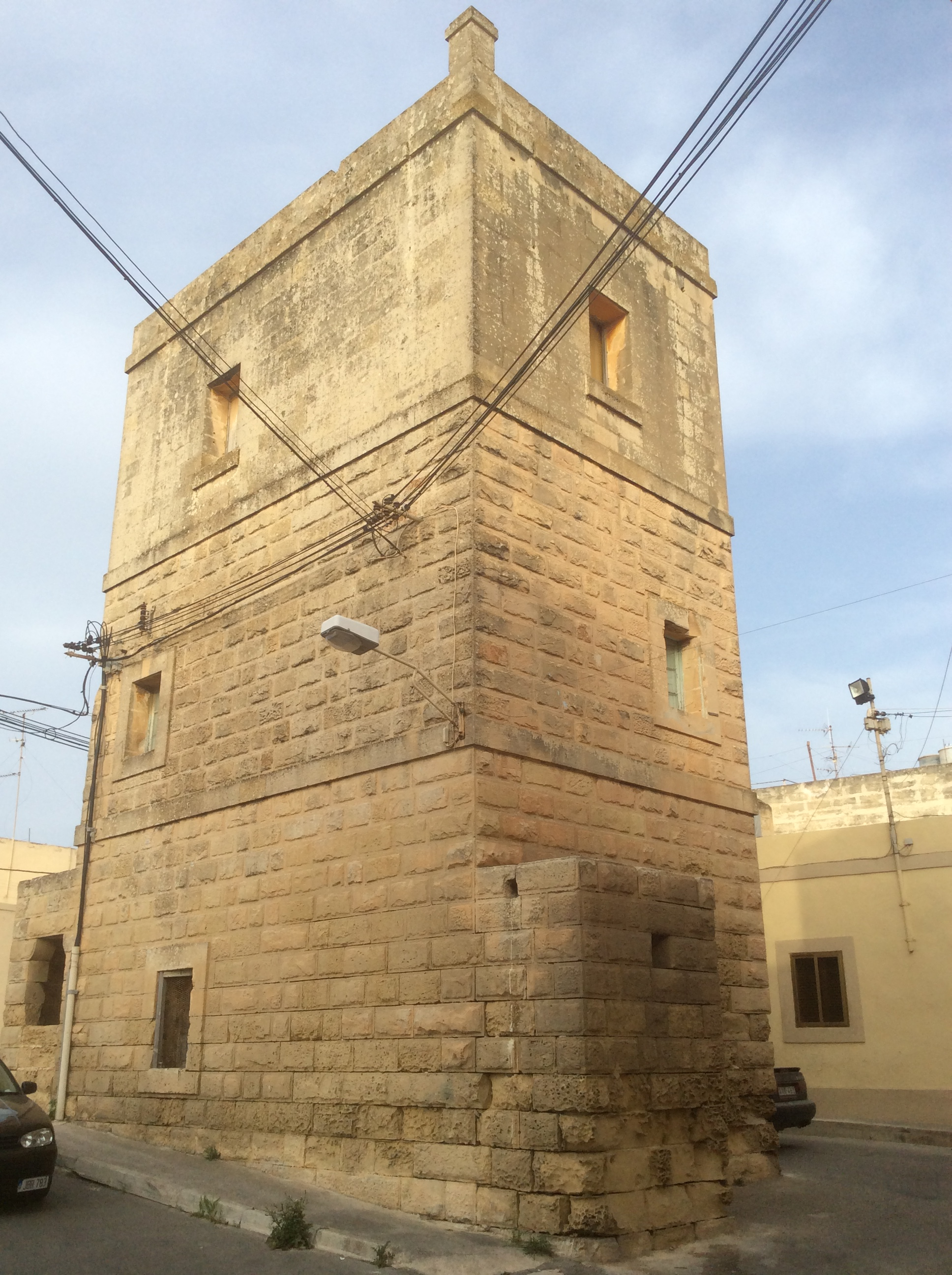

The Għaxaq Semaphore Tower was built at the highest point in the town, and its roof has views of Birżebbuġa, Marsaxlokk and Mdina. The semaphore system became obsolete with the introduction of the electrical telegraph, and all the stations in Malta were closed by the 1880s.

In August 2011, the tower was transferred to the Għaxaq Local Council at a nominal rent of €250 per year. The council intends to restore the building with the assistance of the NGO Fondazzjoni Wirt Artna.

== Architecture ==
The Għaxaq Semaphore Tower is identical to the towers at Għargħur and Ta' Kenuna, consisting of three floors, each containing a single room. The floors are linked together and with the roof by a spiral staircase. The signalling equipment, consisting of a wooden pole with three movable arms, was located on the tower's roof.

== See also ==
- Sannat Semaphore Tower
