= Delimara Lighthouse =

Lighthouse in Malta

Delimara Lighthouse Delimara Point Lighthouse
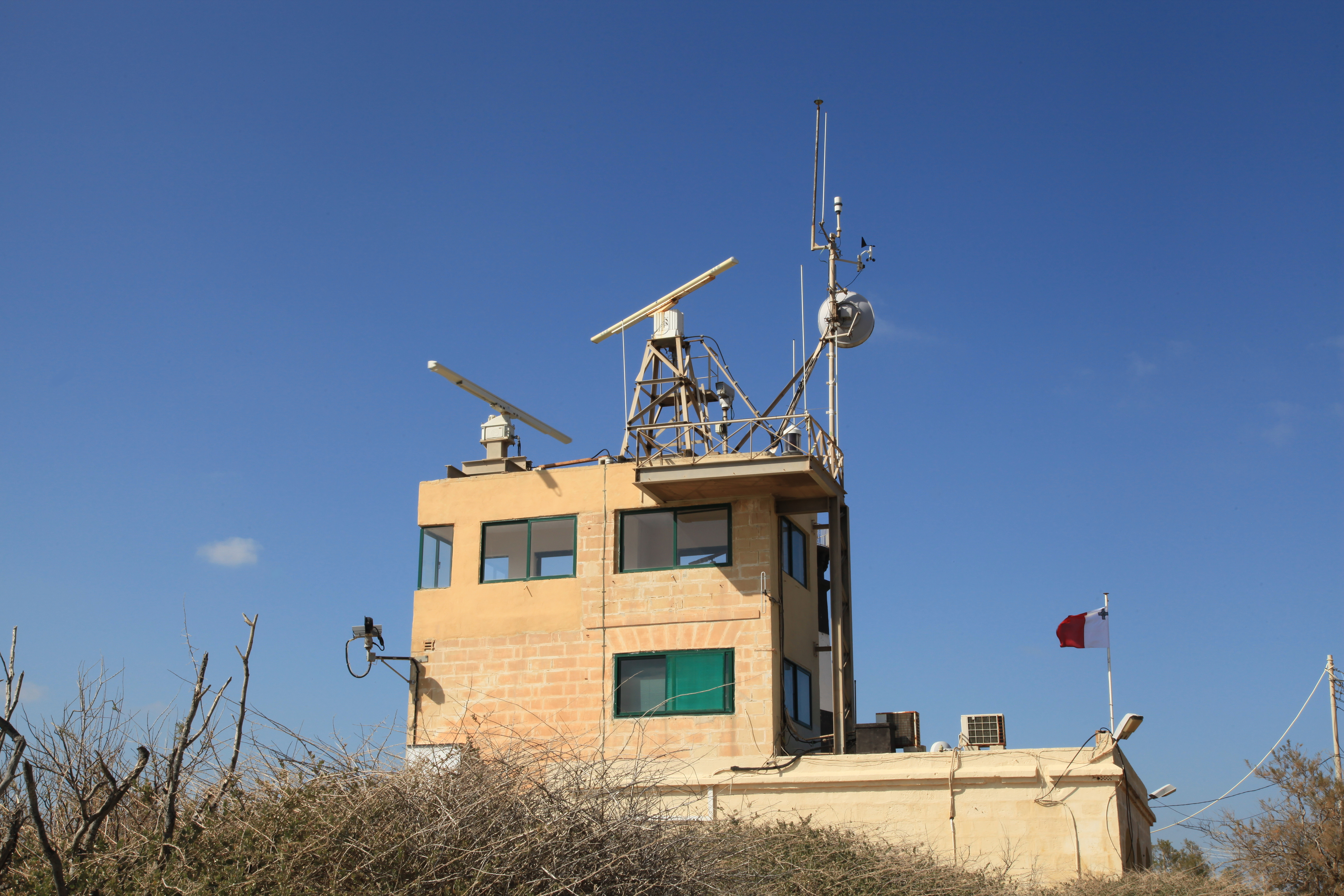
- Current lighthouse
- Location: Marsaxlokk, Malta
- Coordinates: 35.822°N 14.559°E

Tower
- Constructed: 1855/1990s
- Construction: Masonry
- Height: 18 metres (59 ft)
- Shape: Two-story building with communications equipment
- Markings: Unpainted building

Light
- Focal height: 35 metres (115 ft)
- Range: 18 nautical miles (33 km; 21 mi)
- Characteristic: Fl (2) W 12s.

The Delimara Lighthouse is an active lighthouse on the island of Malta. It is the second lighthouse to be built on the Delimara point near Marsaxlokk at the southern end of the island. The original lighthouse which was built in the mid 19th century still exists alongside the more modern rectangular tower which opened in 1990. This newer two storey building has observation windows, with roof mounted radar and aerials, and is used for coastal traffic control.

The lighthouse has views of Marsascala and Birżebbuġa which is found opposite the lighthouse. It is also close to Saint Peter's Pool. The original 1850s lighthouse is still present and near the contemporary rectangular two storey tower that was inaugurated in 1990.

== History ==
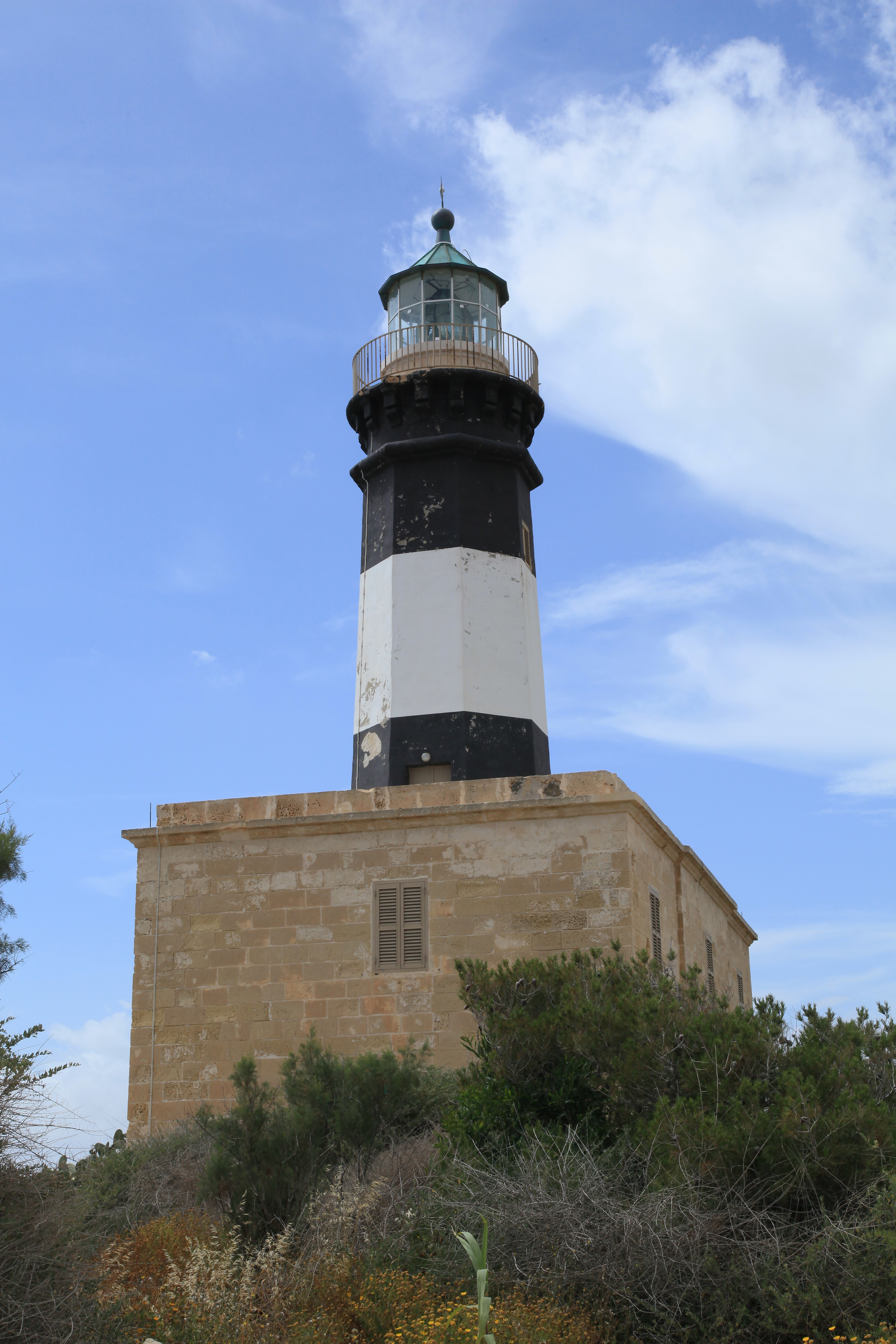
The restored 19th century lighthouse

The first lighthouse opened in 1855. It was constructed at the same time as the Giordan Lighthouse, which marks the northern end of the island of Gozo. Both were built during the time of British rule on the islands.

The initial light system produced a constant red light, using lamps powered by olive oil. This was replaced in 1896 by a rotating optic system supplied by the Chance Brothers of Smethwick, which used a rotating table coupled with a Fresnel lens to produce an alternating red and white flash every thirty seconds. The apparatus was powered by a weight slowly descending from the lantern room, which drove a clockwork mechanism turning the table at a set rotation. It was lit using lamps powered by paraffin, which was stored in a copper tank with ornate brass fittings.

The light continued in operation, until 1990 when it was deactivated. The building which consists of an octagonal 22m tower with a two-storey house was found to be in a poor state of repair, and was handed over to Din l-Art Helwa for renovation.

Throughout the years the Delimara Lighthouse acted as a beacon to the Maltese shipping industry. It is also considered by some to be a landmark of British architecture.

== Restoration ==
The restoration has been carried out in three phases. The first part of the refurbishment involved the restoration of the external part of the tower. The outside openings needed maintenance, and lost timber apertures were changed. Moreover, the entire fabric of the lighthouse was restored, including damage to the walls, timber apertures, roof and the lantern tower, which had been in a moderate state of conservation prior to the refurbishment. All cement deposits that were included in the years before were taken out and the mortar joints were plastered with a hydraulic lime-based mix.

The second phase concentrated on the interior of the lighthouse. Works such as plumbing and electricity, maintenance of internal apertures and the installation of a kitchen and bathrooms were carried out in order to convert the lighthouse back to a livable environment. These restoration projects were finished by the first months of 2008.

The third and final phase involves the restoration of the lantern machinery and mechanism. This includes the lantern's housing and gas prisms. This last phase took 5 years to be completed. The restoration was being sponsored by the Malta Maritime Authority. It has been carried out by Din l-Art Helwa and supported by GasanMamo Insurance. The ultimate aim of the project, besides giving back life to an important historic landmark through the works of volunteer's, is to offer visitor accommodation in a historic site.

== Accommodation ==
The Delimara lighthouse keeper's accommodations have been transformed into two apartments available for rent. The apartments can accommodate up to ten people in total, five in each flat. These are situated around the central funnel of the lighthouse, and have views of the surrounding coast.

== See also ==
- List of lighthouses in Malta
