= Għargħur Semaphore Tower =

Semaphore Tower
- It-Torri tas-Semaforu
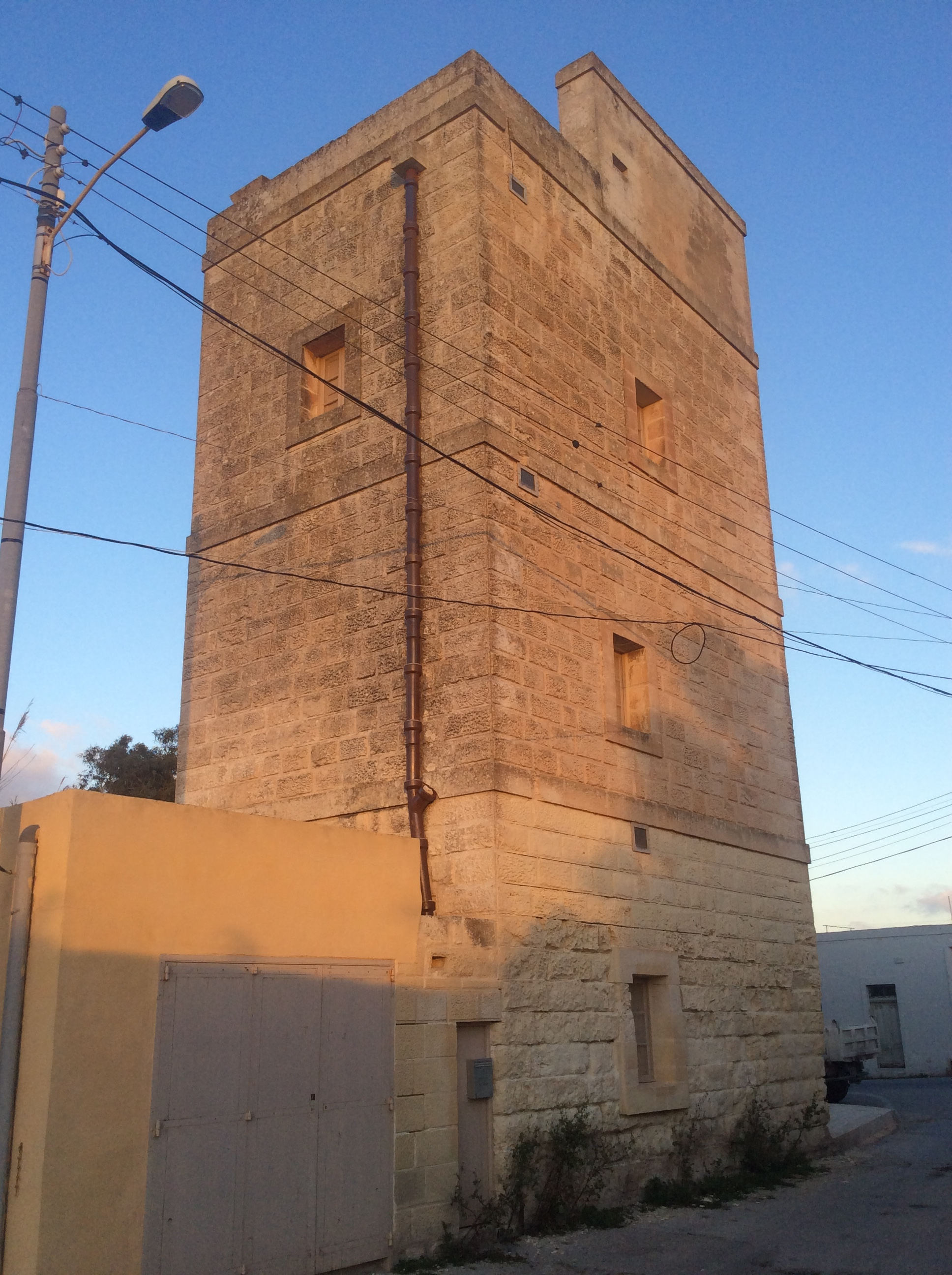
- View of the Għargħur Semaphore Tower

General information
- Status: Intact
- Type: Semaphore tower
- Location: Għargħur, Malta
- Coordinates: 35°55′10.7″N 14°26′56.7″E
- Completed: 1848

Technical details
- Material: Limestone
- Floor count: 3

The Għargħur Semaphore Tower (Maltese: It-Torri tas-Semaforu tal-Għargħur) is a semaphore tower in the town of Għargħur, Malta. It was built by the British in 1848, as one of three semaphore towers in Malta. The tower was restored in 2009, and it is now in good condition.

== History ==
The semaphore telegraph system was invented in 1792, and the British military authorities began to consider installing such a system in Malta in the early 1840s. Initially, it was planned that semaphore stations would be established on the bell towers and domes of the island's churches, but the religious authorities rejected the proposal. Due to this, in 1848 new semaphore towers were constructed at Għargħur and Għaxaq on the main island of Malta, and another was built at Ta' Kenuna in Nadur, Gozo. Further stations were established at the Governor's Palace in Valletta, Selmun Palace near Mellieħa, and the Giordan Lighthouse near Għasri, Gozo. Each station was staffed by the Royal Engineers.

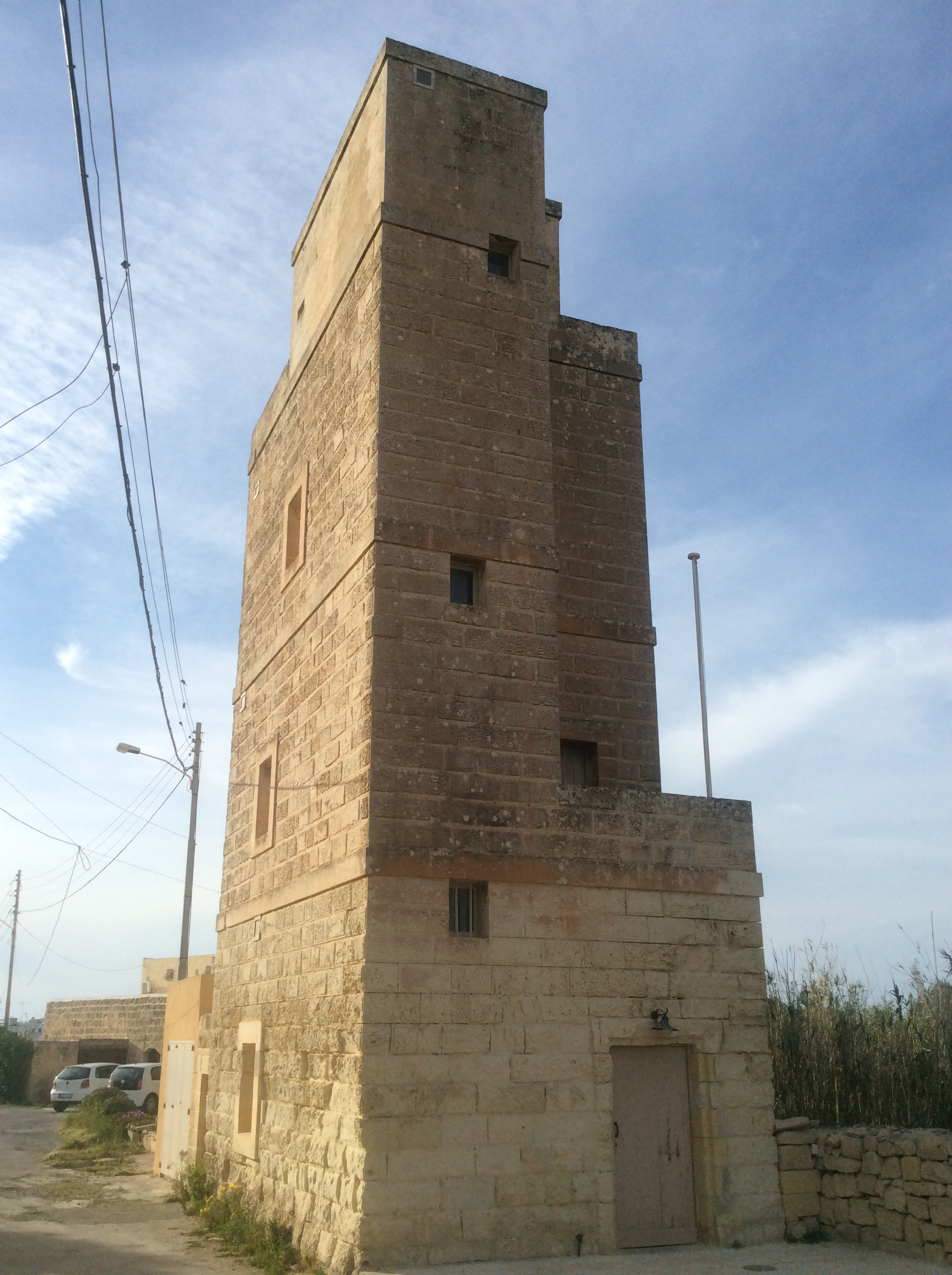
The front of the tower

The semaphore system became obsolete with the introduction of the electrical telegraph, and all the stations in Malta were closed by the 1880s. In World War II, the Għargħur Semaphore Tower was used as an observation vantage point by the 2nd Battalion, Royal Irish Fusiliers.

The tower eventually became private property, but it was taken over by the Għargħur Local Council in 2004. The building was restored by the local council, the Restoration Unit of the Works Division and Fondazzjoni Wirt Artna in 2009. The restoration mainly focused on the outer walls at ground level, which had been damaged by humidity. The interior of the tower, which dates back to when it was still in use, was also preserved. The tower, known in Maltese as it-Torri tas-Semaforu, is now sometimes open to the public on special occasions.

== Architecture ==
The Għargħur Semaphore Tower is identical to the towers at Għaxaq and Ta' Kenuna, consisting of three floors, each containing a single room. The floors are linked together and with the roof by a spiral staircase. The signalling equipment, consisting of a wooden pole with three movable arms, was located on the tower's roof.
