= Ta' Kenuna Tower =

1848 semaphore tower in Malta

- Torri ta' Kenuna
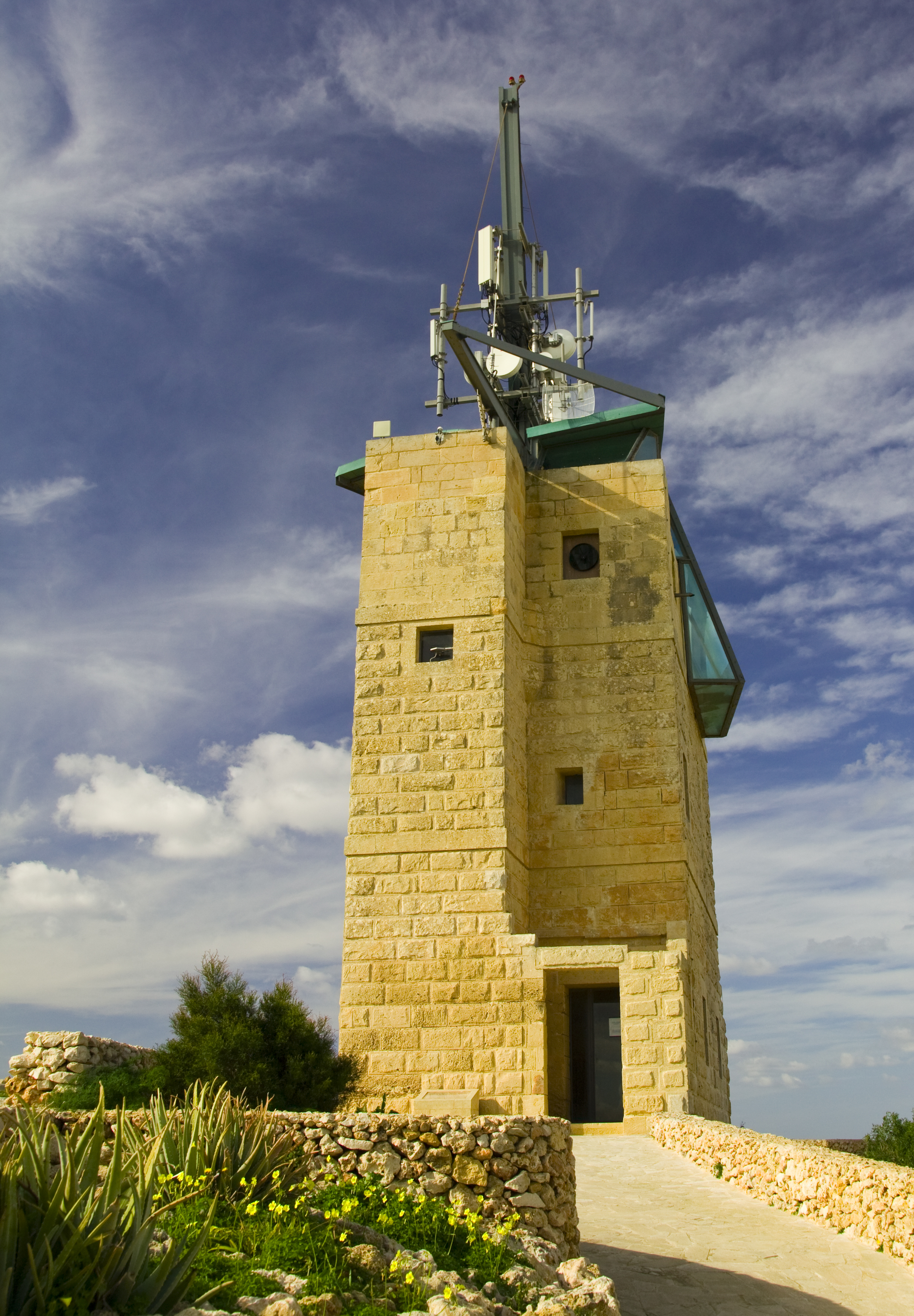
- View of Ta' Kenuna Tower

General information
- Status: Intact
- Type: Semaphore tower
- Location: Nadur, Gozo, Malta
- Coordinates: 36°2′7.9″N 14°17′2.1″E
- Completed: 1848
- Renovated: 2005

Technical details
- Material: Limestone
- Floor count: 3

Ta' Kenuna Tower (Maltese: Torri ta' Kenuna) is a semaphore tower on the cliffs near Nadur on the island of Gozo, Malta. It was built by the British in 1848, as one of three semaphore towers in Malta. The tower was restored in 2005, and now houses a beacon to warn ships of their proximity to land, as well as a number of communication antennas.

== History ==
The semaphore telegraph system was invented in 1792, and the British military authorities began to consider installing such a system in Malta in the early 1840s. Initially, it was planned that semaphore stations would be established on the bell towers and domes of the island's churches, but the religious authorities rejected the proposal. Due to this, in 1848 new semaphore towers were constructed at Nadur on Gozo, and Għargħur and Għaxaq on the main island of Malta. Further stations were established at the Governor's Palace in Valletta, Selmun Palace near Mellieħa, and the Giordan Lighthouse near Għasri, Gozo. Each station was staffed by the Royal Engineers.

Ta' Kenuna Tower was built on a hill 130 metres (430 ft) above sea level, so as to be able to pass on signals to ships and other posts via a telegraphy link between the two main Maltese islands, and to communicate with the towers at Għargħur and Għaxaq. The semaphore system became obsolete with the introduction of the electrical telegraph, and Ta' Kenuna Tower closed in 1883.

In 2005, the Nadur Local Council with the help of Maltacom (now GO) sponsored restoration works of the tower. A beacon to warn ships of their proximity to land, as well as a number of communication antennas were installed on the roof. The modern additions are mounted on the surface of the tower, and care was taken to preserve the historic fabric of the original structure.

View from garden around tower

Today, one can ask permission from the tower's watchman to go on top of the covered roof of the tower for a panoramic view of Gozo, Comino and Malta. The surrounding gardens contain a number of endemic plants.

== Architecture ==
Ta' Kenuna Tower is identical to the towers at Għaxaq and Għargħur, consisting of three floors, each containing a single room. The floors are linked together and with the roof by a spiral staircase. The signalling equipment, consisting of a wooden pole with three movable arms, was located on the tower's roof.
