= List of lighthouses in Malta =

This is a list of lighthouses in Malta.

== Lighthouses ==
Name	Image	Location coordinates	Year built	Tower height	Focal height	Notes
Delimara Lighthouse		Marsaxlokk, Malta 35.822°N 14.55885°E	1854	22 m (72 ft)	46 m (151 ft)	Now deactivated, renovated
Delimara Lighthouse (New)		Marsaxlokk, Malta 35.822°N 14.55885°E	1990	18 m (59 ft)	35 m (115 ft)	Modern lighthouse built to replace historic light
Fort St. Elmo Light		Fort Saint Elmo, Malta 35.90194°N 14.51861°E	1976	10 m (33 ft)	49 m (161 ft)	Skeleton tower above the fort
Giordan Lighthouse		Ghasri, Gozo 36.0722°N 14.2184°E	1853	22 m (72 ft)	180 m (591 ft)	
Ricasoli Breakwater Lighthouse		Grand Harbour, Malta 35.899334°N 14.522998°E	1908	9 m (30 ft)	11 m (36 ft)	Masonry tower with red lantern
St. Elmo Breakwater Lighthouse		Grand Harbour, Malta 35.902643°N 14.525468°E	1908	14 m (46 ft)	16 m (52 ft)	Masonry tower with green lantern
Mgarr Main Breakwater Light		Mgarr, Gozo 36.02498°N 14.30196°E	1970s	5 m (16 ft)	8 m (26 ft)	Conical tower painted red and white
Mgarr North Breakwater Light		Mgarr, Gozo 36.02599°N 14.30194°E	1970s	5 m (16 ft)	7 m (23 ft)	Conical tower painted green and white
Portomaso Lighthouse		St. Julians, Malta 35.921604°N 14.494808°E	1990s	6 m (20 ft)	8 m (26 ft)	Modern design, part of new marina

Map of the lighthouses of Malta

== See also ==
- Lists of lighthouses and lightvessels
