= Telegraph Hill (Dukes County, Massachusetts) =

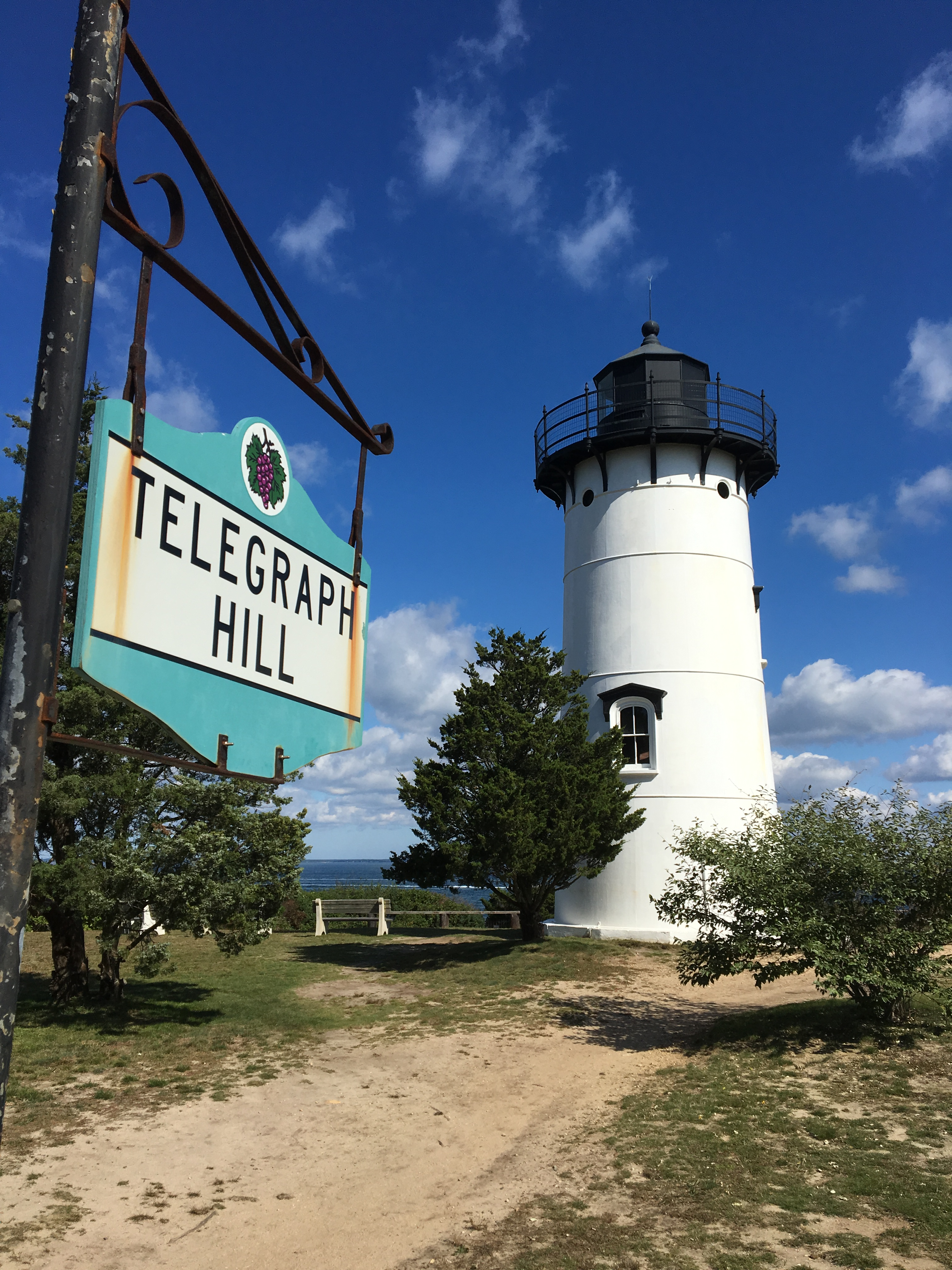
- Lighthouse on Telegraph Hill

Highest point
- Elevation: 36 ft (11 m)
- Coordinates: 41°28′13″N 70°34′00″W

Geography
- Location within Massachusetts Location within the United States
- Location: Martha's Vineyard, Massachusetts
- Topo map: USGS Edgartown

Telegraph Hill is a hill in Dukes County, Massachusetts. It is on Martha's Vineyard 1 mile (1.6 km) north of Oak Bluffs in the Town of Oak Bluffs. Pilot Hill is located west-southwest of Telegraph Hill.
