= Telegraph hill =

Elevated site of a telegraph station

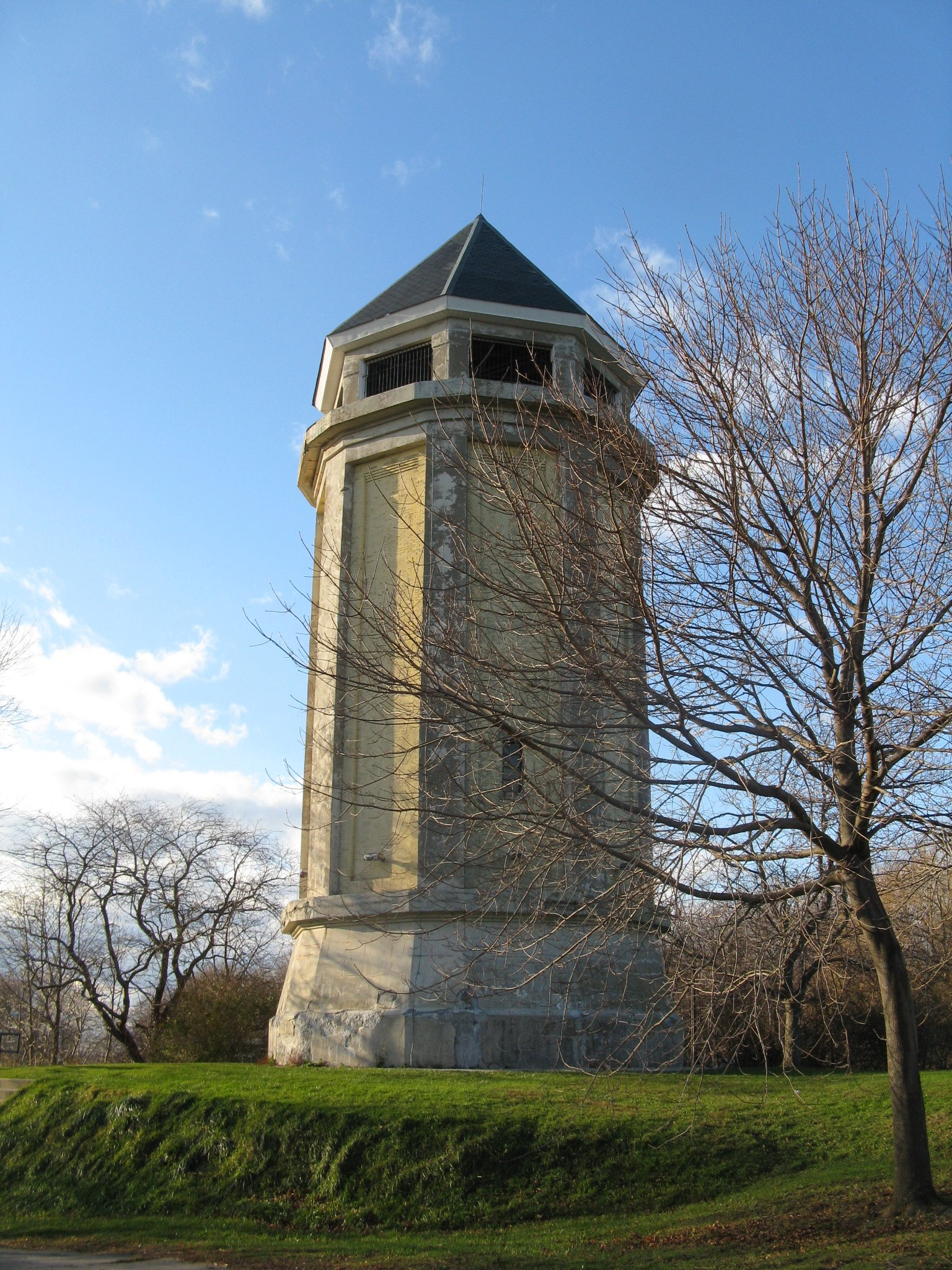
Tower on Telegraph Hill in Fort Revere Park, Hull Massachusetts

A telegraph hill is a hill or other natural elevation that was formerly the site of a telegraph station. From the end of the 18th century, these stations were used to send optical signals using semaphores, warning of imminent danger or passing on other significant news.

It was chosen as part of an optical telegraph system because of the relatively great distance between it and at least one other point, which it may observe or be observed from. In the 18th and 19th centuries, such points were in some cases in permanent use for commerce and public administration, and in others, identified in advance of need or as need arose, especially for command and control in military operations.
