= Giordan Lighthouse =

Giordan Lighthouse Ta' Ġurdan Lighthouse
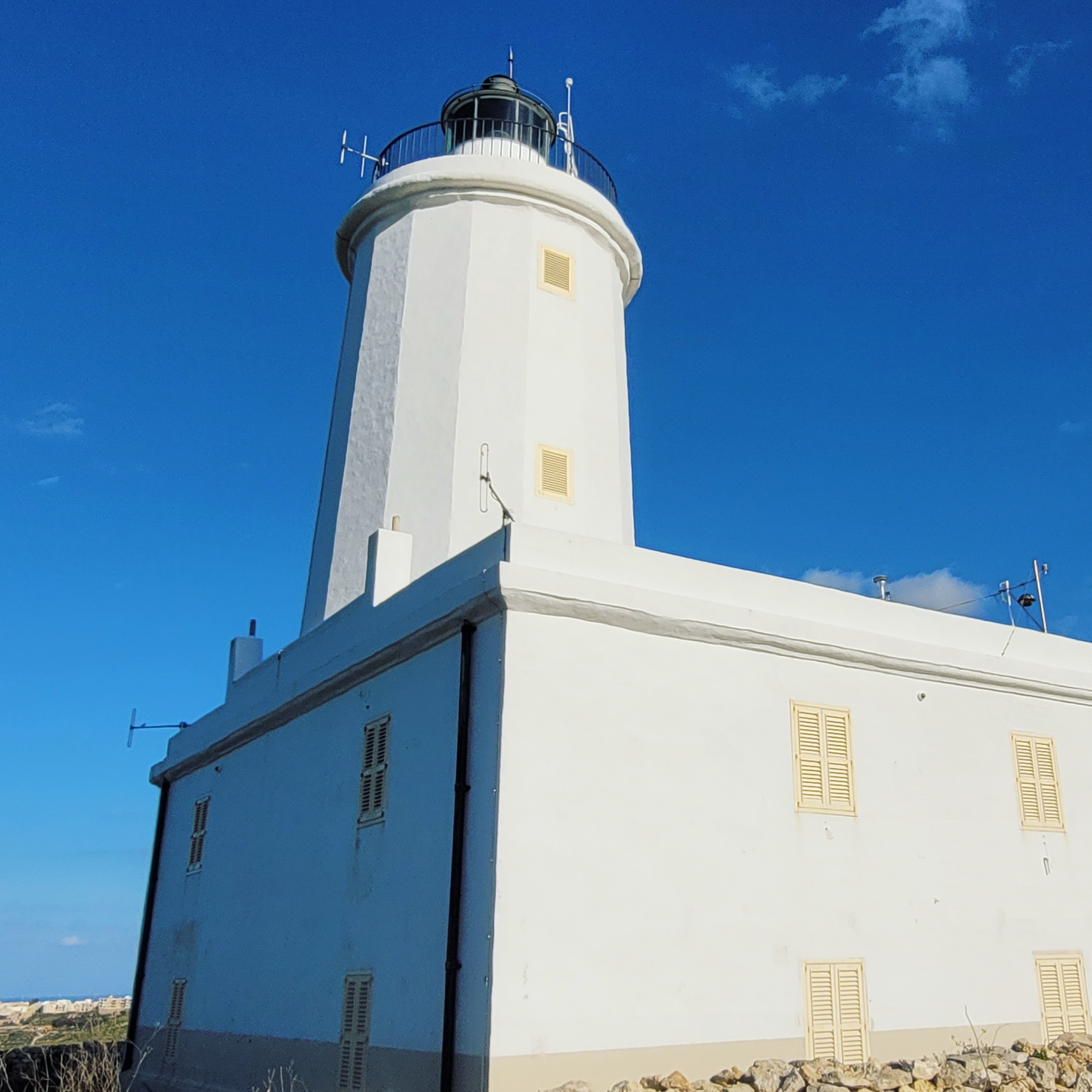
- Giordan Lighthouse
- Location: Għasri, Gozo; Malta
- Coordinates: 36.0722°N 14.2184°E

Tower
- Constructed: 1650 (first)
- Foundation: two storey square stone base
- Construction: stone tower
- Automated: 1994
- Height: 22 metres (72 ft)
- Shape: cylindrical tower with balcony and lantern
- Markings: white tower and lantern

Light
- First lit: 1853 (current)
- Focal height: 180 metres (590 ft)
- Range: 20 nautical miles (37 km; 23 mi)
- Characteristic: Fl W 7.5s.

The Giordan, Ġordan (Maltese: Il-Fanal ta' Ġurdan) is an active lighthouse on the Maltese island of Gozo. It is located on Ġurdan hill above the village of Għasri on the northern coast of the island.

== History ==
An earlier lighthouse was known to exist at the site in 1667, which was financed by the Knight Fra Henry de Gourdan (Langue of Auvergne).

A semaphore station was installed on the light in the 1840s. The current light began operation on 15 March 1853, and was built during the period when the islands were part of the British Empire.

During World War II, the lighthouse was used as the location for an early warning radar station. The radar would provide information about bombers coming south from Italy, allowing air raid sirens to be activated prior to the raids.

Due to its hilltop location it has a considerable focal height of 180m above the sea, and can be seen for 20 nautical miles, and consists of a flashing white light every 7.5 seconds.

The lighthouse site is a tourist attraction, providing a panoramic viewpoint across the island, and can be accessed by car or by walking up the steep hill from the village.

Air quality instruments based at the lighthouse measure a number of parameters including sulphur dioxide, carbon monoxide and nitrogen oxide as part of the Global Atmosphere Watch system of atmospheric monitoring. The site is the primary station for the central Mediterranean, and was upgraded from 2008 to 2011. Information is transmitted back to the University of Malta campus in Xewkija for analysis.

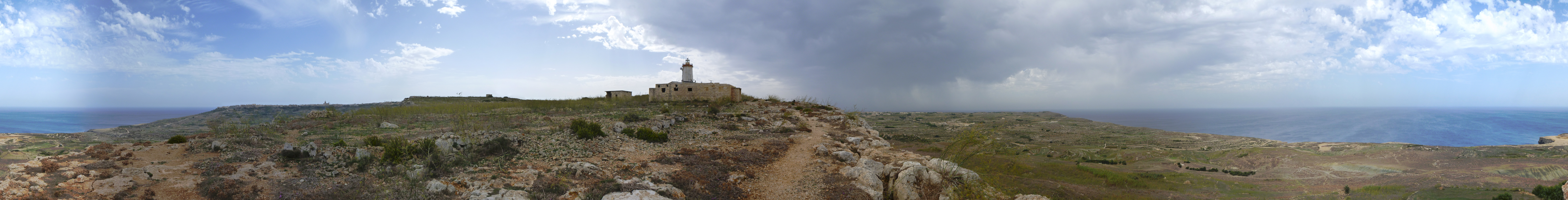
Giordan Lighthouse Panorama

== See also ==
- List of lighthouses in Malta
