= Fort Blockhouse =

Former military establishment in Gosport, Hampshire, England

Coordinates: 50°47′24″N 1°06′50″W

- Gosport, England
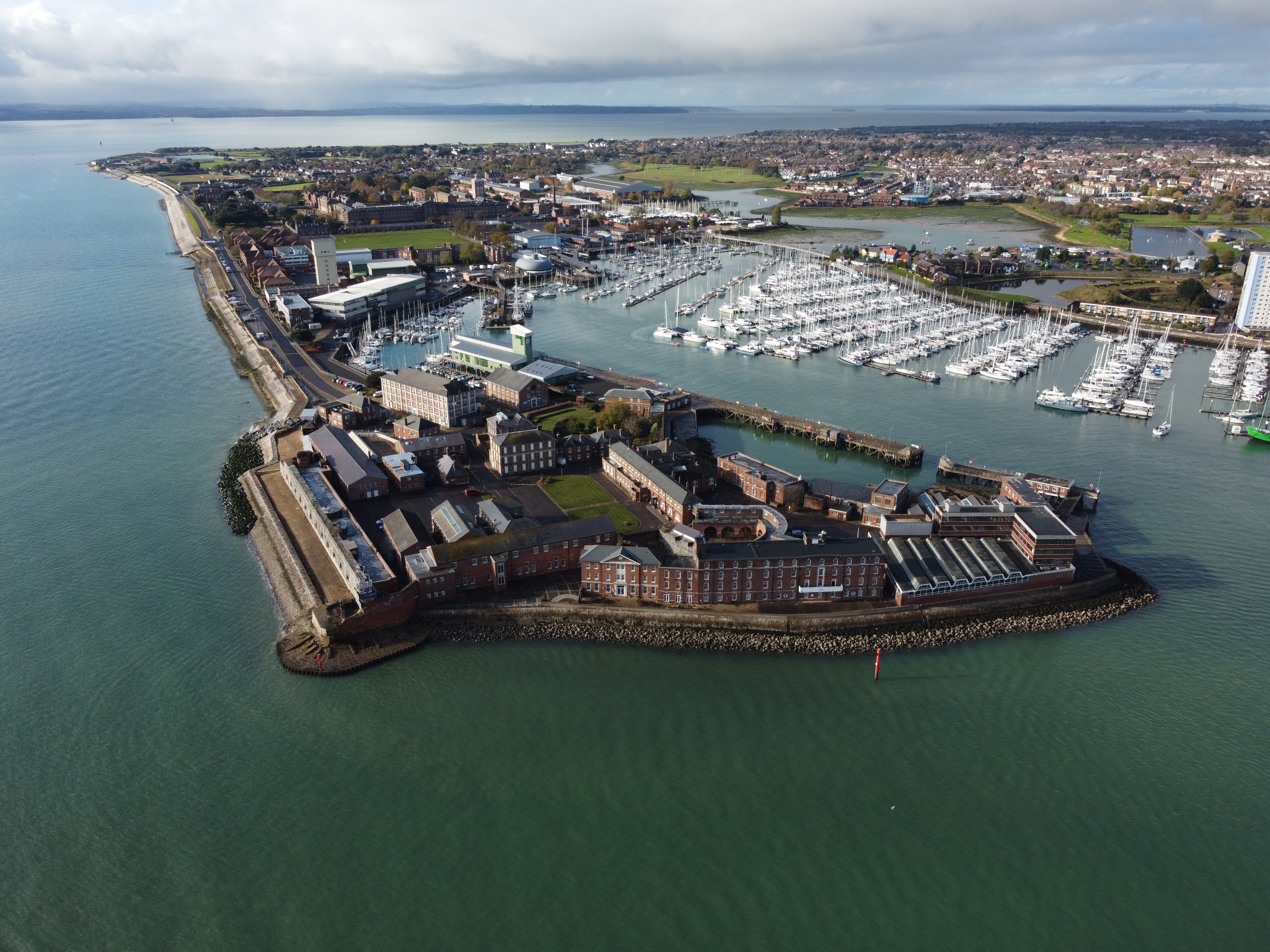
- Fort Blockhouse (centre) and Haslar Marina (right)

Site information
- Type: Fort, later submarine base
- Condition: Complete

Location
- Location within Hampshire

Site history
- Built: 1431, various additions until 1960s
- In use: 1431–1539 (as blockhouse); 1539–1956 (as battery); 1905–1998 (as submarine base); 1996–2020 (as training site); 2002- present (as RAMC barracks)
- Battles/wars: Siege of Portsmouth (1642)

Fort Blockhouse is a former military establishment in Gosport, Hampshire, England, and the final version of a complicated site. At its greatest extent in the 19th century, the structure was part of a set of fortifications which encircled much of Gosport. It is surrounded on three sides by water and provides the best view of the entrance to Portsmouth Harbour. As HMS Dolphin, the fort was for most of the 20th century the home of the Royal Navy Submarine Service. It is unique in that it was built over five centuries from its original construction as a blockhouse in 1431 to the final addition of submarine base structures in the mid-1960s.

Coastal fortification was abolished nationally in 1956, and the submarines left in the 1990s, but Fort Blockhouse continued to operate as a military establishment until December 2021.

== History ==
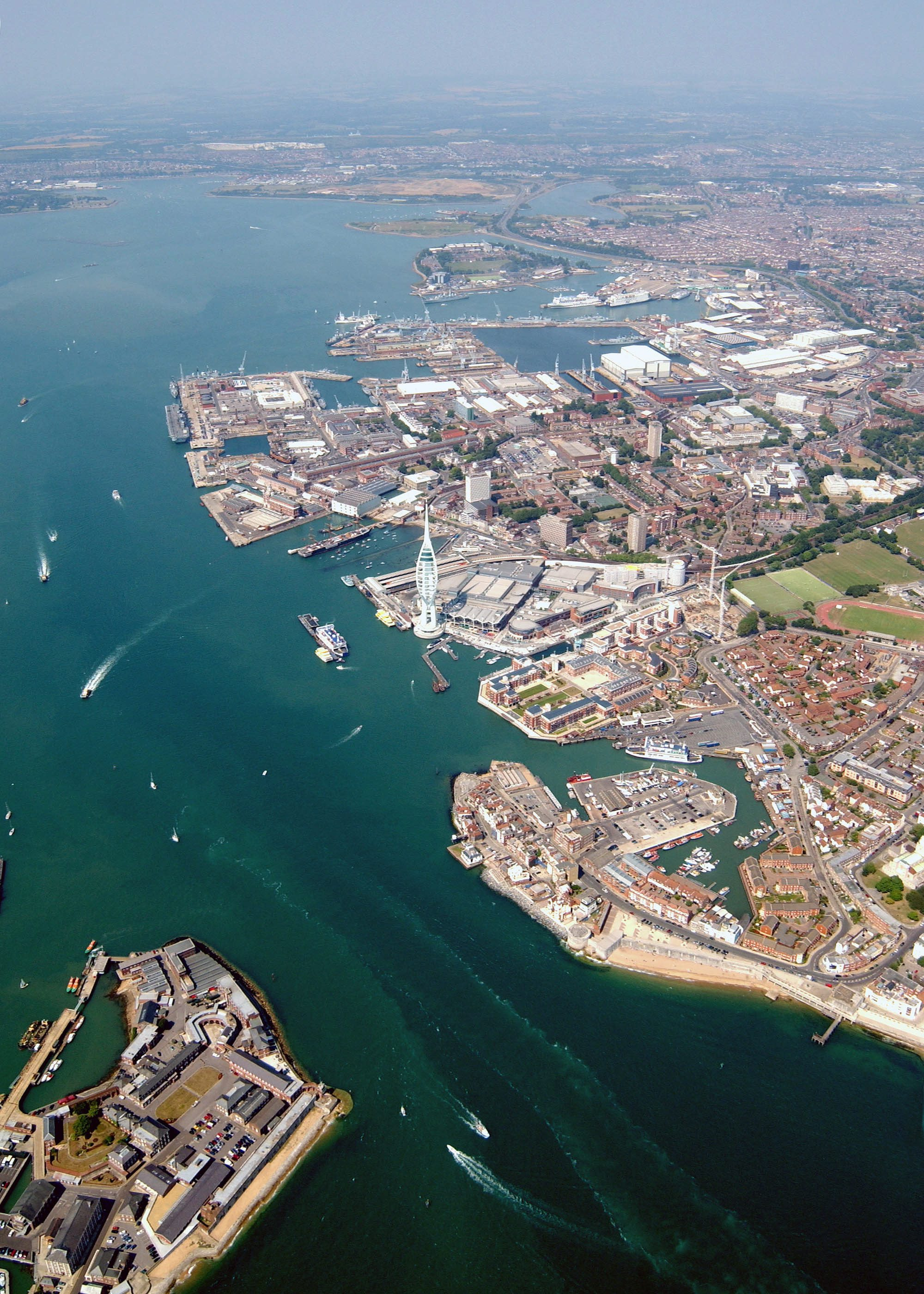
View of Fort Blockhouse (bottom left) facing Old Portsmouth across the entrance to the harbour.

=== Early fortifications (1431–1667) ===
Following the burning of Portsmouth during the Hundred Years' War, money was set aside in 1417 to provide protection for Portsmouth Harbour. A timber blockhouse was first built on the Gosport side of the harbour in 1431, after authorisation by Henry VI. A chain was strung from Blockhouse point to a similar tower in Portsmouth, which could be raised to prevent entry to the harbour by enemy ships. It was subsequently rebuilt and strengthened, and in 1542 John Leland described it as a round stone tower with ordnance.

Around the year 1539 a 'bulwark' was built by Thomas Spert to the south-west of the blockhouse (where Haslar Hospital now stands); it was subsequently known as Lymden's Bulwark. Further to the south another fort was built in 1545-46 named Haselworth Castle, though this was abandoned only eleven years after construction. The Cowdray engraving of The Encampment of the English forces near Portsmouth in 1545 depicts all three structures, with Haselworth still under construction; two years later the 1547 Inventory of Henry VIII lists 'Lymden's Bulwark by the West Haven, under Captain John Lymden' and also 'Hasillworth Castle', but the blockhouse is omitted (implying it was no longer armed at this time). By the end of the century all these fortifications were in a derelict state, and a few decades later only a mound remained to indicate the site of the former bulwark.

=== Modernised fort (1667–1877) ===
Map of Portsmouth c.1668 showing the chain defence across the harbour entrance; Gosport Point, with de Gomme's battery, is to the right on this south-up map.

In 1665, during the Second Dutch War, Sir Bernard de Gomme was commissioned by Charles II to improve the Portsmouth defences. Two years later he installed a new L-shaped battery on Gosport Point (where the blockhouse had formerly stood): it consisted of a row of eighteen guns facing south-east, to protect the seaward approach to the harbour, and two more guns pointing south-west, so as to protect the landward approach to the battery (which was along a narrow spit of land). The following decade an eighteen-gun battery was constructed by de Gomme alongside the Round Tower on the Portsmouth side of the harbour entrance, matching the battery on the Gosport side. To the north, on the west side of the harbour, de Gomme built two square defensive towers, Charles Fort (at Gosport) and James Fort (on Burrow Island), which were completed by 1679; while on the landward side he began constructing a bastioned trace around the town of Gosport in 1678.

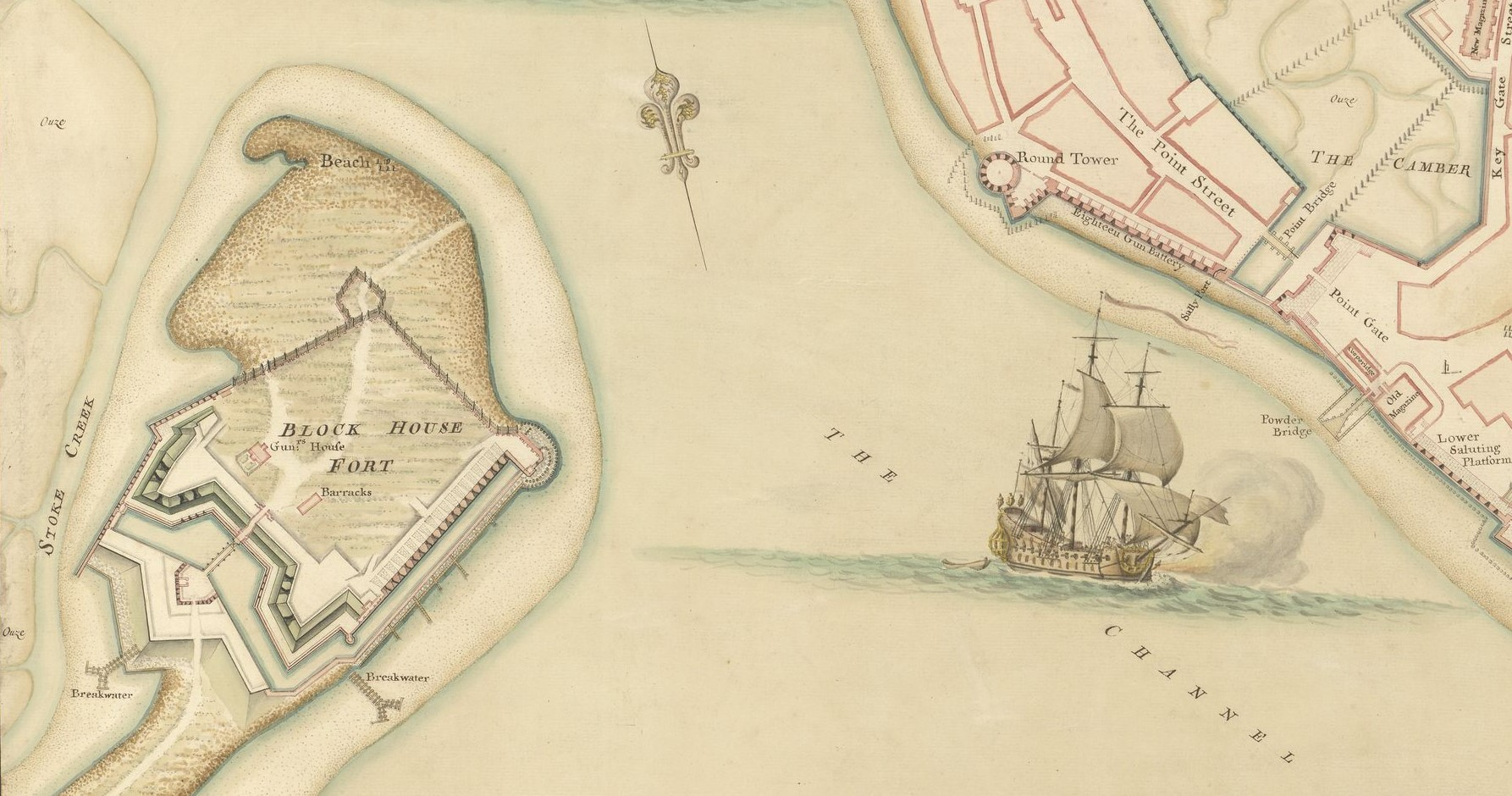
Detail of a 1750 map by J. P. Desmaretz, showing Fort Blockhouse (left) in relation to the Round Tower and battery on the other side of the entrance to the harbour.

An inspection in the early 18th century, however, found that the defences had fallen into poor condition; Captain Talbot Edwards (who, as Second Engineer, was made responsible for surveying the Portsmouth fortifications) said of the battery that 'this work like the rest is all gone to ruine'. Between 1708 and 1714 the battery was completely rebuilt to create a bastioned fort, with a renewed seaward-facing open-air battery to the south-east and significant defensive earthworks to the south-west. The shape of the 18th-century fort can still be discerned and surviving elements of the 1708 works are the oldest still present on the site. The entrance to the fort on the south-west side consisted of a tall gatehouse flanked by two demi-bastions; the gatehouse was demolished in the 1960s, but its keystone survives on site, decorated with the arms of the Board of Ordnance and inscribed Anno 1708. The fort was surrounded by a moat on the south-west and south-east sides, the former crossed by a bridge which was protected at its far end by a stone redan and angled outer earthworks. To the north the fort was enclosed by wooden palisades which formed a bastion at the northernmost point. In the 1750s the fort was described as being armed with twenty-one 18 pounder guns and three 6 pounders.

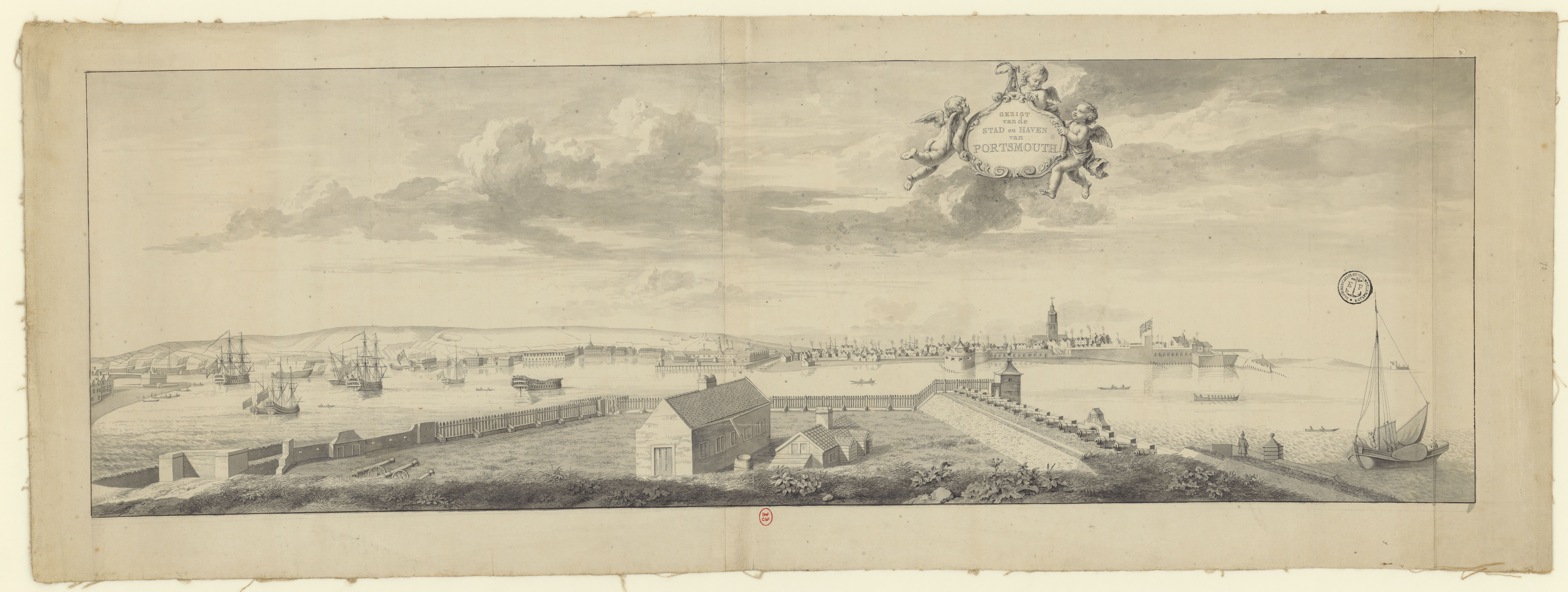
An 18th-century view of Portsmouth from Fort Blockhouse

Beyond Fort Blockhouse the Gosport fortifications were extended northwards in 1757 in order to enclose the Weevil brewery (which had been acquired by the Victualling Commissioners a few years earlier). New defences were constructed for Gosport in 1778, with the bastioned Fort Monckton situated on the ground that had been occupied by Haselworth Castle in the Tudor era. Further renovations took place from 1797 to 1803, amid fears of French invasion. This created a line of bastions defending Gosport all the way from Blockhouse Point up to Forton Lake on the far side of the town, with French prisoners of war making up a part of the construction workforce. These developments rendered some of the older works redundant: both James Fort and Charles Fort were allowed to fall into ruin in the early 19th century.

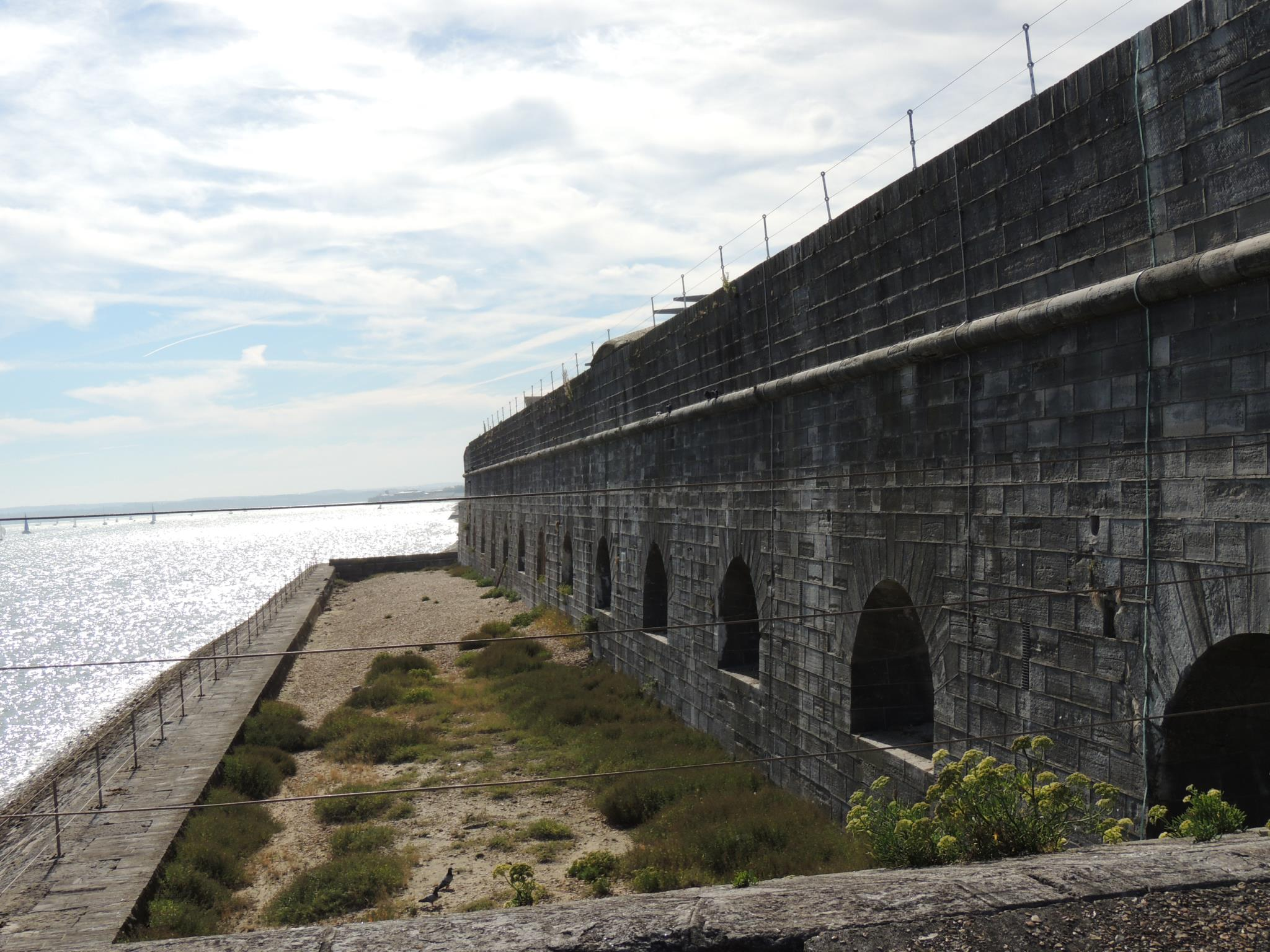
The South Casemates of 1845–48 represent the third reconfiguration of de Gomme's 21-gun battery; the overgrown sandy area in front is the former moat.

By 1805 Fort Blockhouse was armed with fifteen 36-pounder and fifteen 18-pounder guns. In 1813, as noted on a preserved datestone, the fort began to be remodelled: the west demi-bastion was extended to the north in 1817-20 and not long afterwards the sea battery was rebuilt with thirteen covered casemates housing 32-pounder guns. The upper part of the battery was strengthened and widened in 1845-48, providing space on the terreplein for a further thirteen guns to be mounted en barbette. This work was part of a substantial rebuilding, which saw the creation of the north bastion: a rounded structure with casemates, built of red brick and fronted in limestone, with upper and lower batteries which provided a field of fire over the harbour. It was linked, to the west bastion on the one hand and to the sea battery on the other, by a pair of long brick-built casemated buildings: the former providing accommodation for officers, the latter for other ranks.

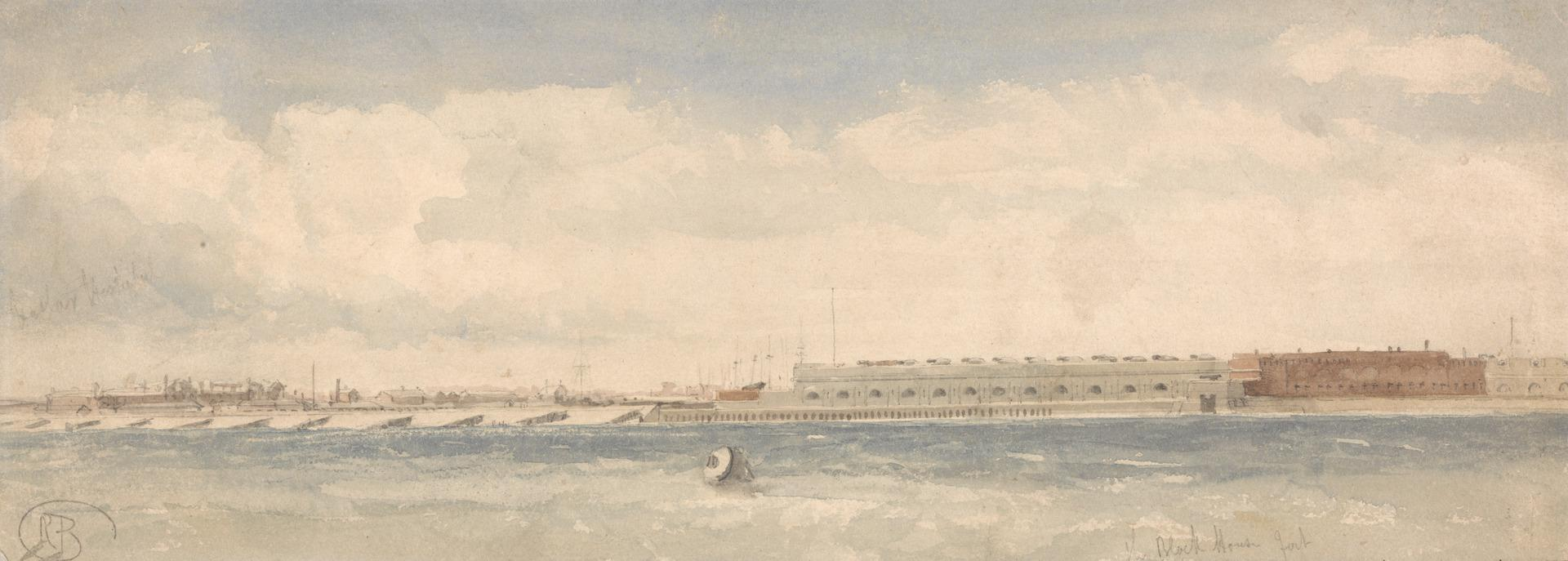
19th-century watercolour painting of the fort by Richard Beavis, showing guns mounted on top of the sea battery.

The 18th-century fortifications of Gosport were considered obsolete by the 1859 Royal Commission on the Defence of the United Kingdom. While the commissioners did not recommend any changes to Fort Blockhouse, nor were its armaments updated: in 1867 it was still armed with 32-pounder smooth-bore cannons.

=== Royal Engineer Submarine Mining Establishment (1873–1907) ===
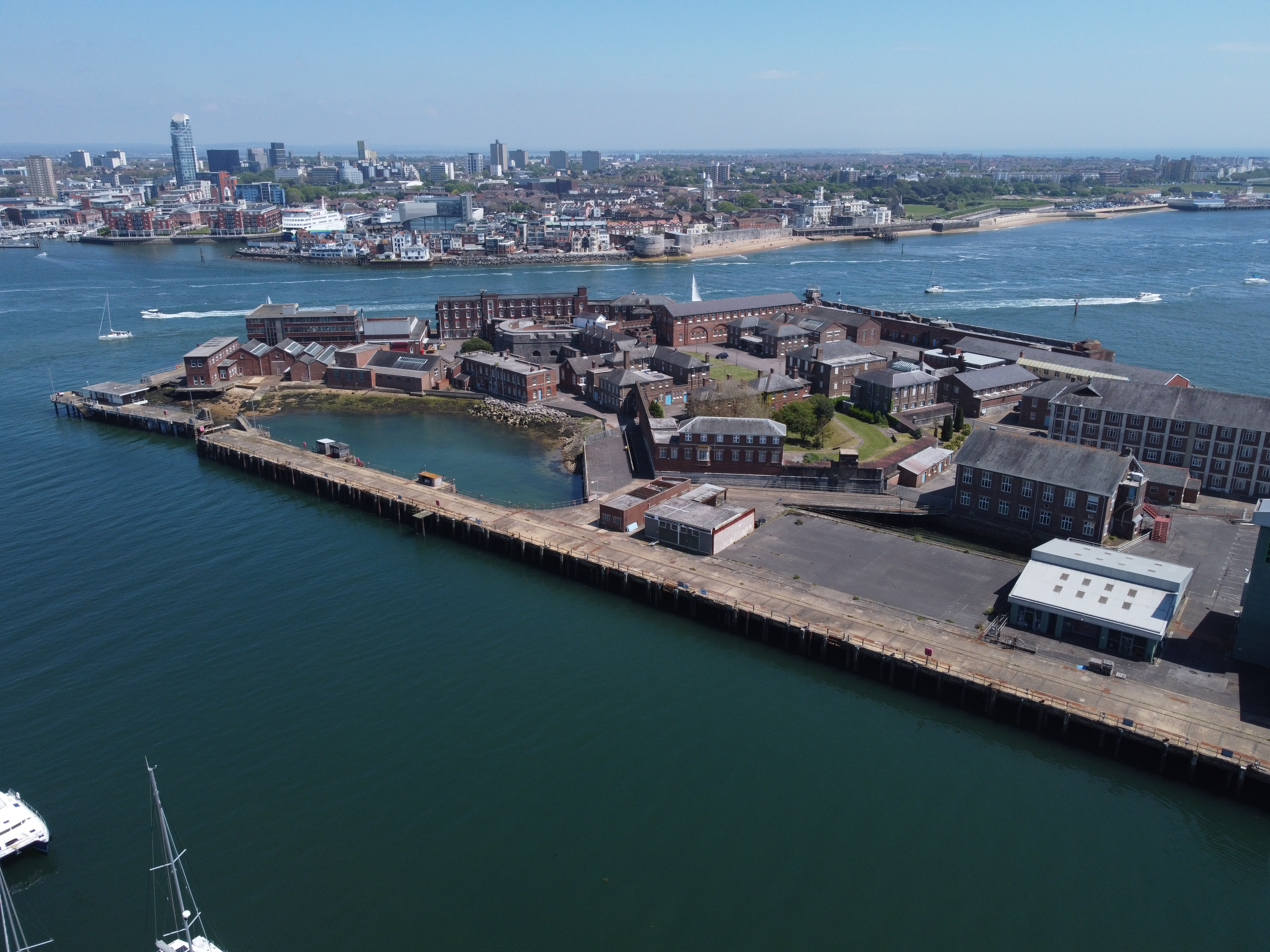
Aerial view of Fort Blockhouse from the north-west (2024): on the left, alongside the basin, are some of the surviving sheds of the Submarine Mining Establishment.

In 1873 Fort Blockhouse began to be used by the Royal Engineers as a base for the deployment of remote-controlled submarine mines as a line of defence for the harbour. At the edge of the headland, to the north of the fort, they built a short pier and several buildings over time, including a set of boathouses and cable sheds (which are still in situ as of 2024, alongside an associated slipway). The casemates of the north bastion were converted into stores for mine casings and other new buildings were erected around the site, along with a light rail system to move the mines and explosives. Additional administrative buildings were added in 1884, when the site also became home to the School of Submarine Miners. The pier was extended in 1888, and additional rooms continued to be added for storage and tests until 1891.

As a fort, Blockhouse was increasingly seen as obsolete and its armament was accordingly reduced, from ten RML 64-pounder guns in 1885 to three in 1888 (three machine guns were also provided, to protect the associated naval minefield). Subsequently five 12-pounder quick-firing guns were installed to combat the emerging threat posed by fast torpedo boats. In 1893-94 a defensive boom was provided, which could be deployed to seal off the harbour entrance (analogous to the old chain defence).

In 1892 a new School of Submarine Mining was established on a site at Stokes Bay (close by Fort Gilkicker), which had previously been used for testing and experimental work. That same year the Royal Engineer companies moved from Fort Blockhouse to Fort Monckton; in their place a linked militia unit (the Portsmouth Militia Division (Submarine Miners) Royal Engineers), previously based at Fort Monckton, moved to Fort Blockhouse where they remained until 1907. The two forts were linked with a narrow gauge railway, which also extended to the facilities in Stokes Bay; the railway survived into the early 20th century.

=== Royal Navy Submarine Base (1905-1998) ===
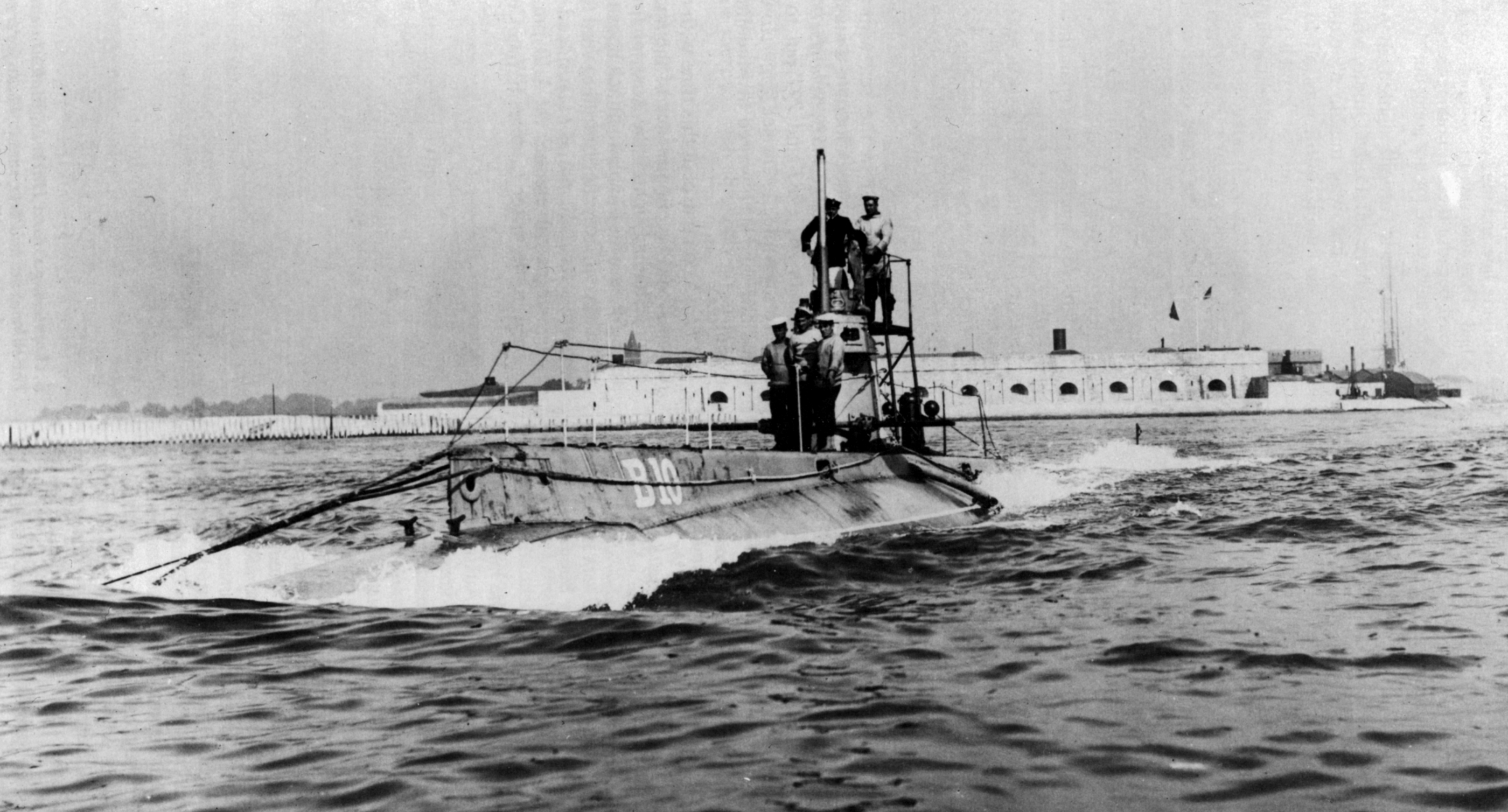
HMS B10 setting off from Fort Blockhouse (c.1906-1912).

The Royal Navy was not persuaded of the benefits of submarine mining and by 1903 the Admiralty was lobbying the War Office to take over submarine mining bases and to replace the fixed minefields with mobile submarines, in order to provide a more effective line of defence. Fort Blockhouse was duly turned over to the Royal Navy in 1905 to serve as a 'Submarine Boat Station': five Holland-class submarines were moved there, together with their depot ship HMS Hazard, and training was provided for submariner recruits in what would become the Royal Navy Submarine School. By 1909 a pier had been built along the north-west edge of the headland, creating an enclosed pool of water; further to the west a 'petrol pier' was built for refuelling. A hulk, HMS Dolphin, was moored nearby to provide additional accommodation and from August 1912 the name HMS Dolphin was extended to cover the whole establishment. From that year the Commodore Submarine Service was based there, as were his successors over the next 65 years. During the First World War HMS Dolphin was the navy’s principal submarine depot. From 1917 periscope training took place there; this later developed into 'Perisher': the Submarine Command Course.

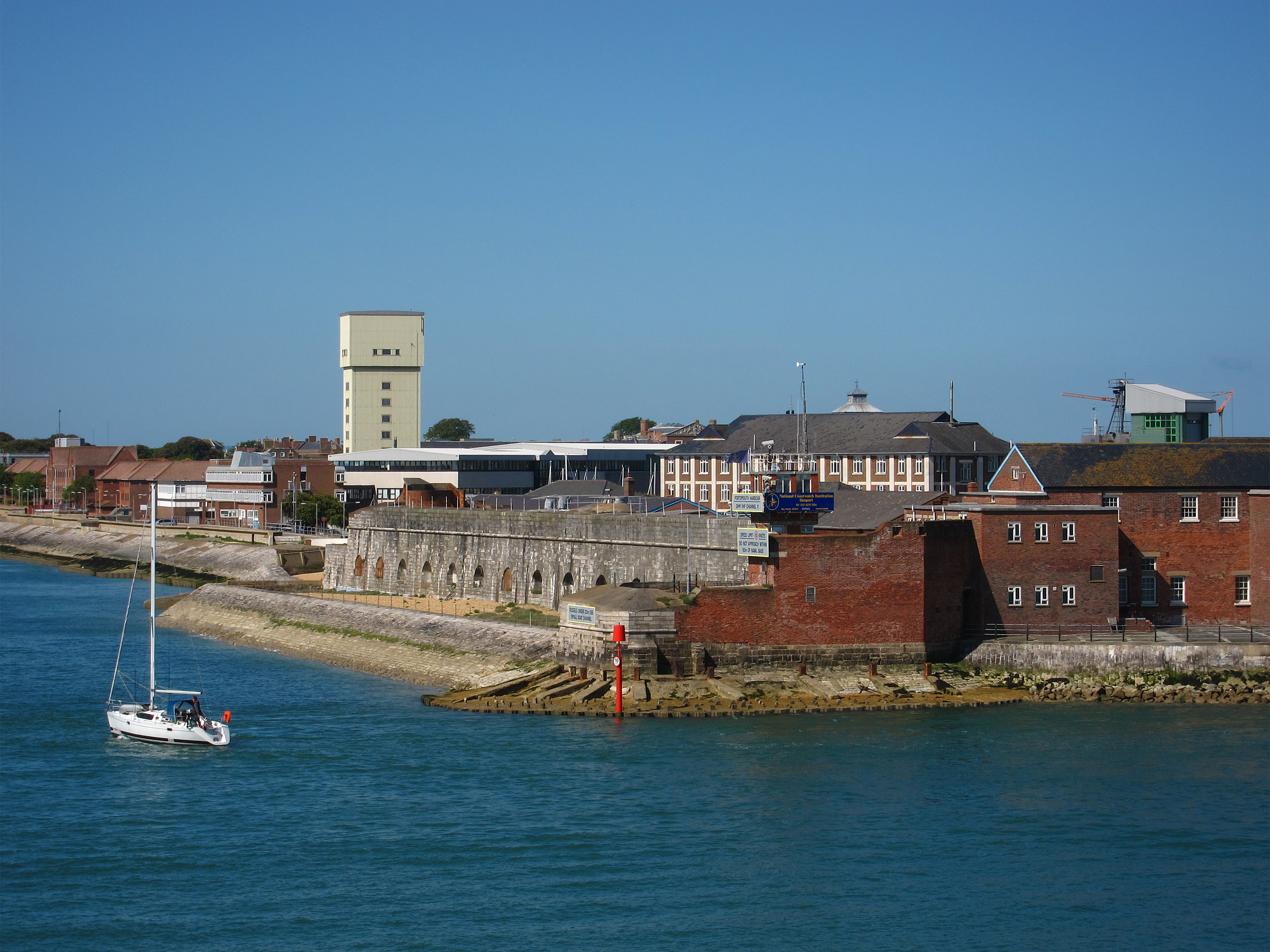
Modern buildings can be seen within and beyond the Fort, including the prominent Submarine Escape Training Tower (centre left), the Vulcan Block (centre right) and the top of the Upholder-class facility (far right).

The period between the two world wars saw significant expansion at HMS Dolphin: on the open courtyard within the bastions of the fort a number of administrative and other buildings were erected; upper floors were added to the casemated accommodation blocks, with the officers' block being extended to create a new officers' mess. The establishment also expanded beyond the lines of the original fort on Blockhouse point: west of the main gatehouse, the defensive moat was infilled in the 1920s and the earthworks were levelled; 'Vulcan Block', providing accommodation for seamen, was built there in 1933, along with a new guardhouse and various other buildings. East of the original fort, alongside the north bastion, a block for Warrant Officers was built facing the harbour; to the north-west, overlooking the piers, a headquarters block for the Rear Admiral was erected in 1937-38.

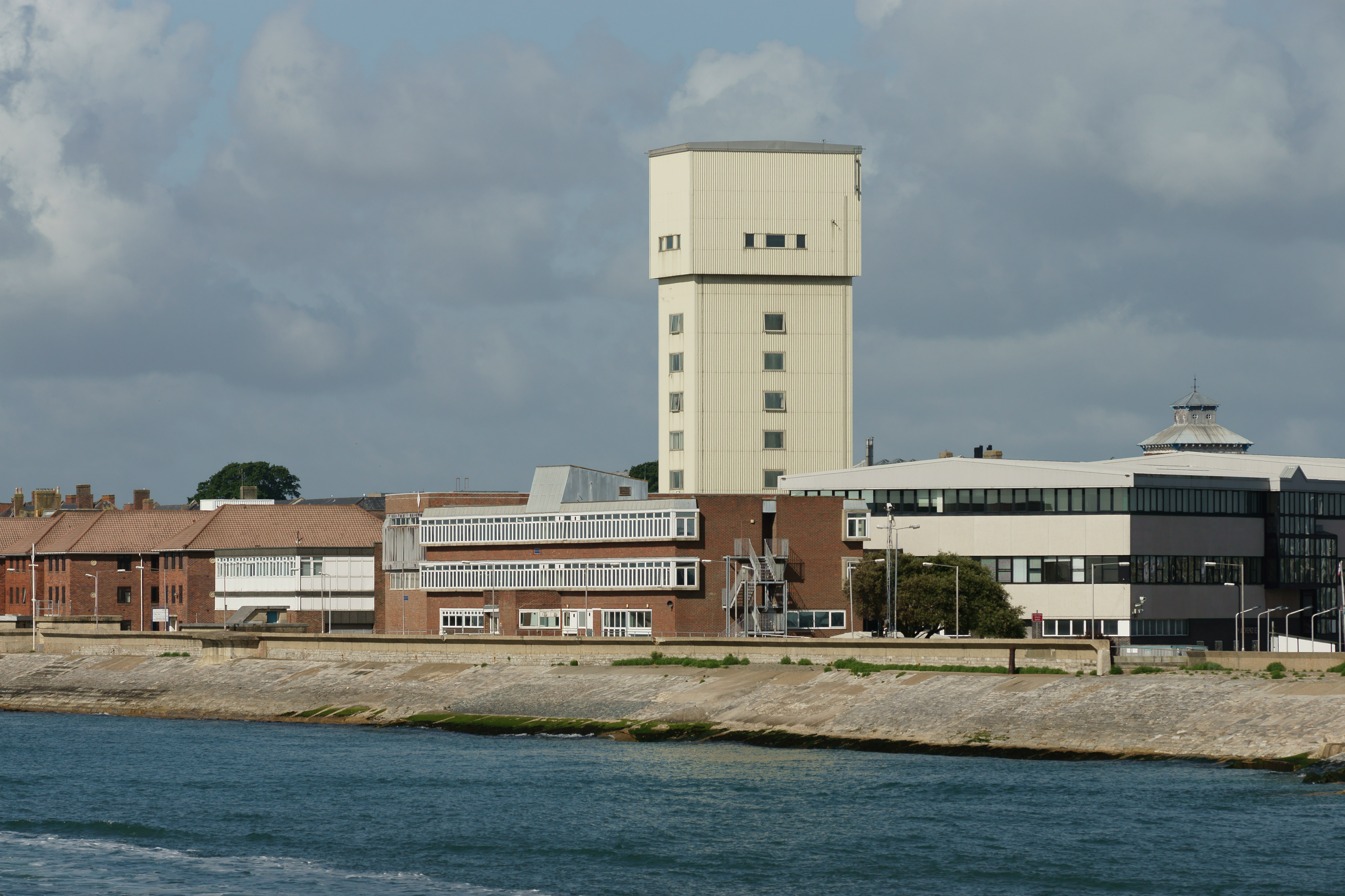
The SETT, flanked by erstwhile buildings of the RN Submarine School.

The prominent Submarine Escape Training Tower (SETT) was built in 1953, and opened in 1954. The need for such a training facility had been made apparent by the loss of HMS Truculent in 1950. Following the disbanding of the UK's Coastal Artillery service, the battery of the fort was disarmed in 1956. At the same time, with the Submarine Service set to take on responsibility for the UK's nuclear deterrent, HMS Dolphin underwent a major expansion: a row of new large accommodation blocks was built alongside the recreation ground, to the west of the fort, looking out on the Solent. In the mid-1960s the training area around the SETT was rebuilt, with modern teaching blocks replacing the wooden huts formerly employed; facilities included practice torpedo tubes, sonar sets, fire-control, missile-launch and navigation systems. New buildings continued to be added through the 1970s, including additional accommodation and a new £2-million training facility ('Mackenzie Block') for the Submarine School.

In 1980 a new Royal Navy Submarine Museum was established just outside the entrance to HMS Dolphin.

The Submarine School continued to expand in the 1980s with the introduction of computer simulators, and an upper floor was added to the Mackenzie Building to accommodate weapons and systems training for the new Vanguard-class ballistic missile submarines. At the end of the decade the Oberon-class submarines, based at HMS Dolphin since the 1960s, were due to be decommissioned and by 1990 over £70-million had been spent on support facilities for their replacements, the Upholder class: a new generation of diesel-electric submarines. The end of the Cold War, however, brought with it a reduction in defence requirements, with the threat of Soviet submarines having passed, and in the end only four (out of a planned nine) replacement vessels were built. In 1992 it was announced that the new submarines would leave HMS Dolphin and join the Trafalgar class at HMNB Devonport; Dolphin would thus cease to be an operational submarine base (though it would continue to function as a training establishment). The last submarine left Dolphin in 1994. Having been declared surplus to requirements in 1996, HMS Dolphin was formally decommissioned in 1998; the RN Submarine School (now under the aegis of HMS Raleigh) departed for Torpoint the following year.

After the decommissioning, control of the fort's jetties passed to the Queen's Harbour Master (who managed them on behalf of the Naval Base commander).

==== Coastal forces (1914-1966) ====
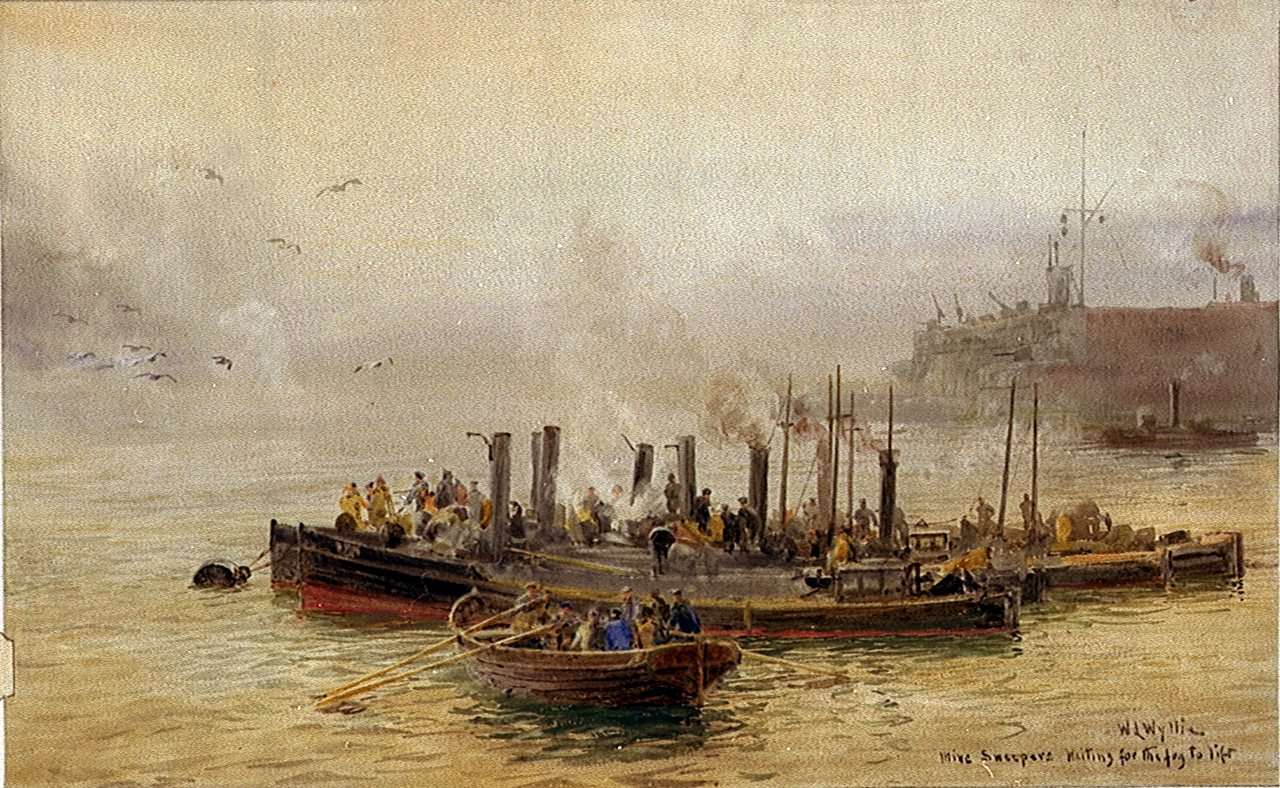
'Mine Sweepers waiting for the fog to lift': naval launches moored off Fort Blockhouse (by W. L. Wyllie, c.1916).

During the First World War a base for coastal motor boats had been established on Haslar Creek, alongside Fort Blockhouse. It closed after the Armistice in 1918, but reopened in 1921; for a time it was placed under the command of HMS Dolphin, but in 1926 it was separately commissioned as HMS Hornet. Hornet closed in 1936 and the site was leased to the Royal Air Force Marine Branch; but at the start of the Second World War it was recommissioned as HMS Hornet and served throughout the war as a Coastal Forces base. By 1943 forty-eight motor torpedo boats were stationed there, along with smaller numbers of motor launches and motor gunboats. After the war Hornet continued in commission until September 1957, when the Coastal Forces division was disbanded; however a small residual 'Coastal Forces Trials and Special Service Squadron' was retained for a time, as part of HMS Dolphin, and provided with two new Brave-class patrol boats. The site then came to be known as 'Dolphin 2'.

By 1964 the former Hornet site was largely disused. That year a sailing club (Hornet S.C.) was established there for serving and ex-Royal Navy personnel, with shore facilities, including a clubhouse in the former wardroom, and marina facilities on the creek. In 1972 the Royal Navy established a 'joint services adventure sailing training centre' alongside the sailing club, which runs offshore sail training for serving members of the armed forces.

==== SETT training facility (1998-2020) ====
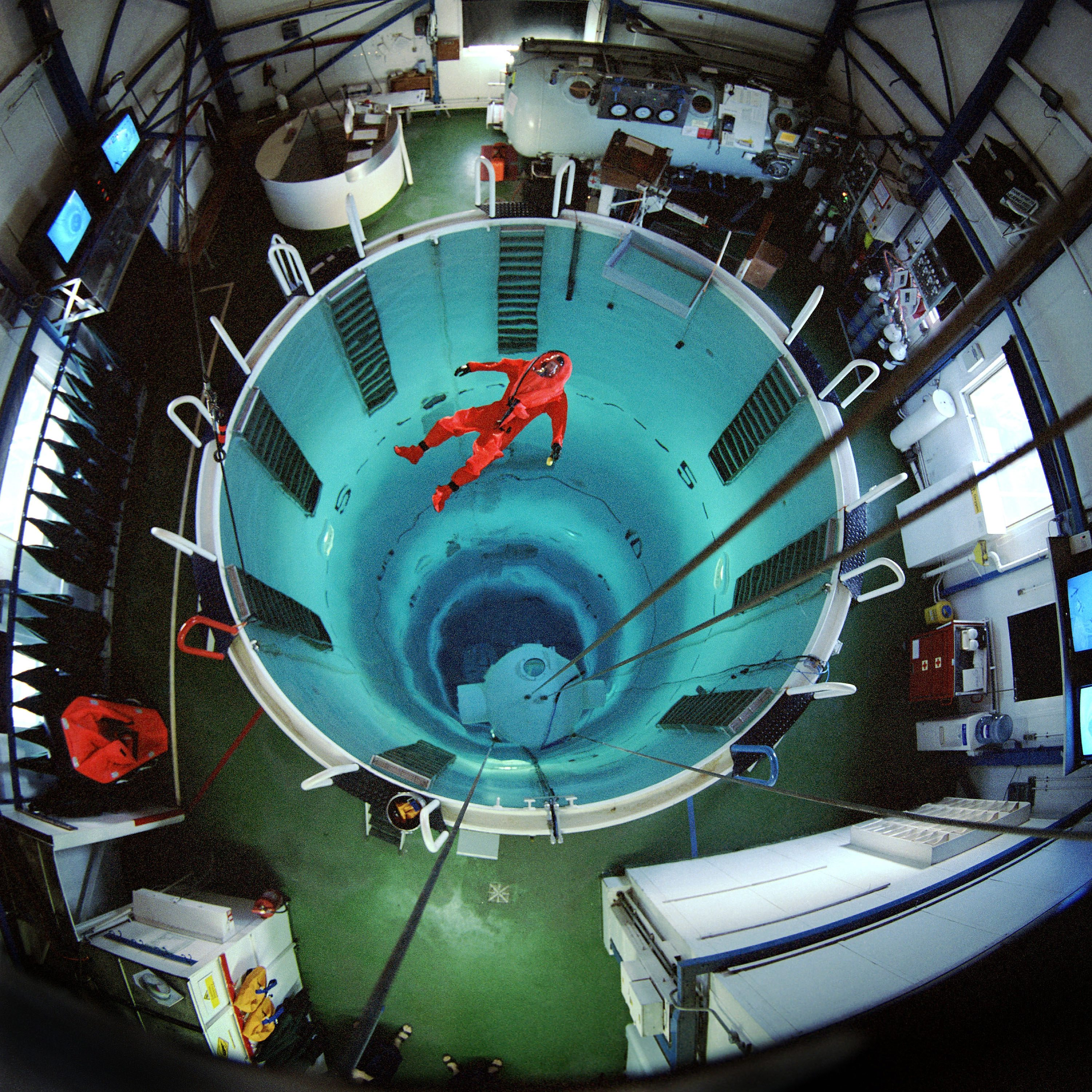
The SETT viewed from above (2004).

The Royal Navy Submarine School (RNSMS) remained at Fort Blockhouse until 23 December 1999, whereupon it moved to HMS Raleigh in Cornwall. Nevertheless, the RNSMS still continued to make use of the Submarine Escape Training Tank (SETT) at Fort Blockhouse for a further twenty years: the SETT was used for pressurised training up until 2012, and then continued to be used for non-pressurised drills and teaching until it was finally decommissioned in January 2020.

Subsequently a new submarine training facility was opened in HMNB Clyde.

=== Military hospital and medical training facilities (1996–2018) ===
The proximity of Fort Blockhouse to the Royal Hospital Haslar led to a number of medical military units and facilities being established there, following the departure of the submarines, in the mid-1990s; this coincided with Haslar becoming Britain's principal (and only) tri-service military hospital.

==== 33 Field Hospital ====
In 1996, 33 Field Hospital (a 200-bed rapid-deployment containerised mobile hospital) relocated to Fort Blockhouse following the closure of Cambridge Military Hospital, Aldershot, where it had been established in 1985. Over the next twenty years the field hospital was regularly deployed, to Kosovo, Iraq and Afghanistan, the last deployment being to South Sudan in 2017. 33 Field Hospital remained at Fort Blockhouse until 1 December 2018, when it was disbanded after 33 years’ existence.

==== Defence Medical Training facilities ====
Also in 1996 the Defence Medical Training Organisation (DMTO) was established at Fort Blockhouse, to assume responsibility for medical training across the three services and to rationalise its delivery. Subsequently, in 1996-97, the Royal Defence Medical College (RDMC) moved to Fort Blockhouse from Millbank: the RDMC provided initial and advanced training for all military Medical Officers and nurses and the majority of medical technicians. Following the decommissioning of HMS Dolphin in 1998, RDMC became responsible for the whole Fort Blockhouse estate. In 2002, however, after the closure of Haslar hospital had been announced, the college relocated from Gosport to Birmingham (where the Royal Centre for Defence Medicine had been established the previous year); it now forms part of the University of Birmingham Medical School.

After the closure of the college, the Defence Medical Education and Training Agency (successor to the DMTO) remained, with its headquarters in the Mackenzie Building at Fort Blockhouse; the DMETA maintained a 'small residual training facility' on the site, which was connected with the local Ministry of Defence Hospital Unit. The DMETA was wound up in 2008, and its functions relocated to DMS Whittington as part of Joint Medical Command.

=== Saluting station ===
Firing the guns to mark the 89th birthday of Elizabeth II (21 April 2015).

Until 2017 Fort Blockhouse was the Royal Navy's main saluting station in Portsmouth. Four QF 3-pounder Hotchkiss guns mounted on the south casemates, the earliest dating from 1886, were regularly used for ceremonial gun salutes; they were the oldest firing guns in the Royal Navy. Latterly HMS Collingwood provided the gun crews; previously they had been manned by staff from HMS Dolphin.

The use of Fort Blockhouse for gun salutes was of long standing; at the Portsmouth Naval Review of 1773 King George III was greeted by 21-gun salutes from Fort Blockhouse, the saluting platform and Southsea Castle. On an earlier occasion, when Charles II was sailing into Portsmouth to inspect the newly-finished fortifications in 1683, a gunner at Fort Blockhouse was killed when one of the guns burst as the salute was being fired.

=== Coastwatch station ===
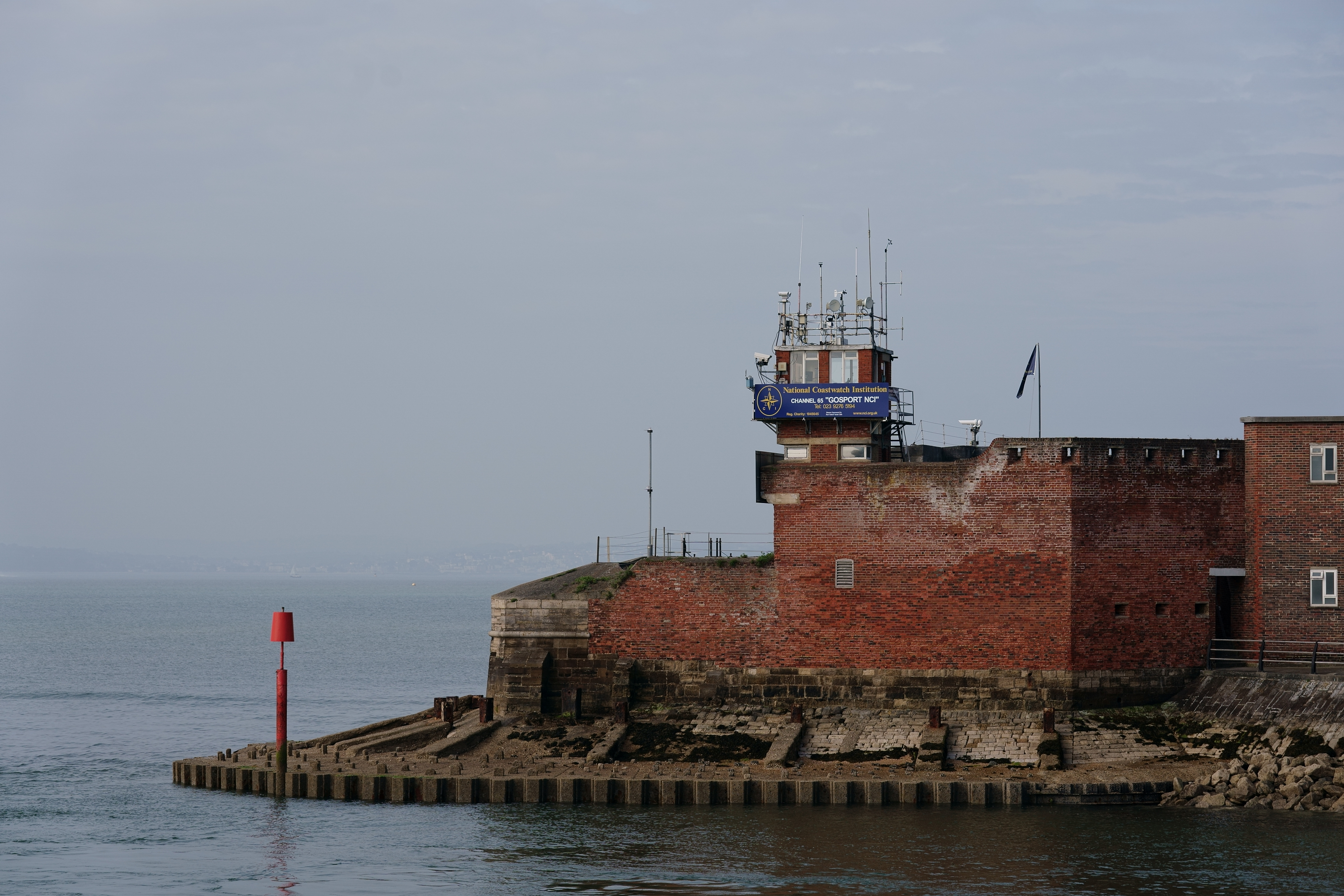
Coastwatch lookout on the East Bastion.

Since 2008 the National Coastwatch Institution (NCI) has maintained a daily lookout from the fort's signal tower; it was visited by the Princess Royal in 2023. Previously, following the decommissioning of HMS Dolphin, the signal tower had been used by the Queen's Harbour Master as a Port Entry Control centre.

== Future ==
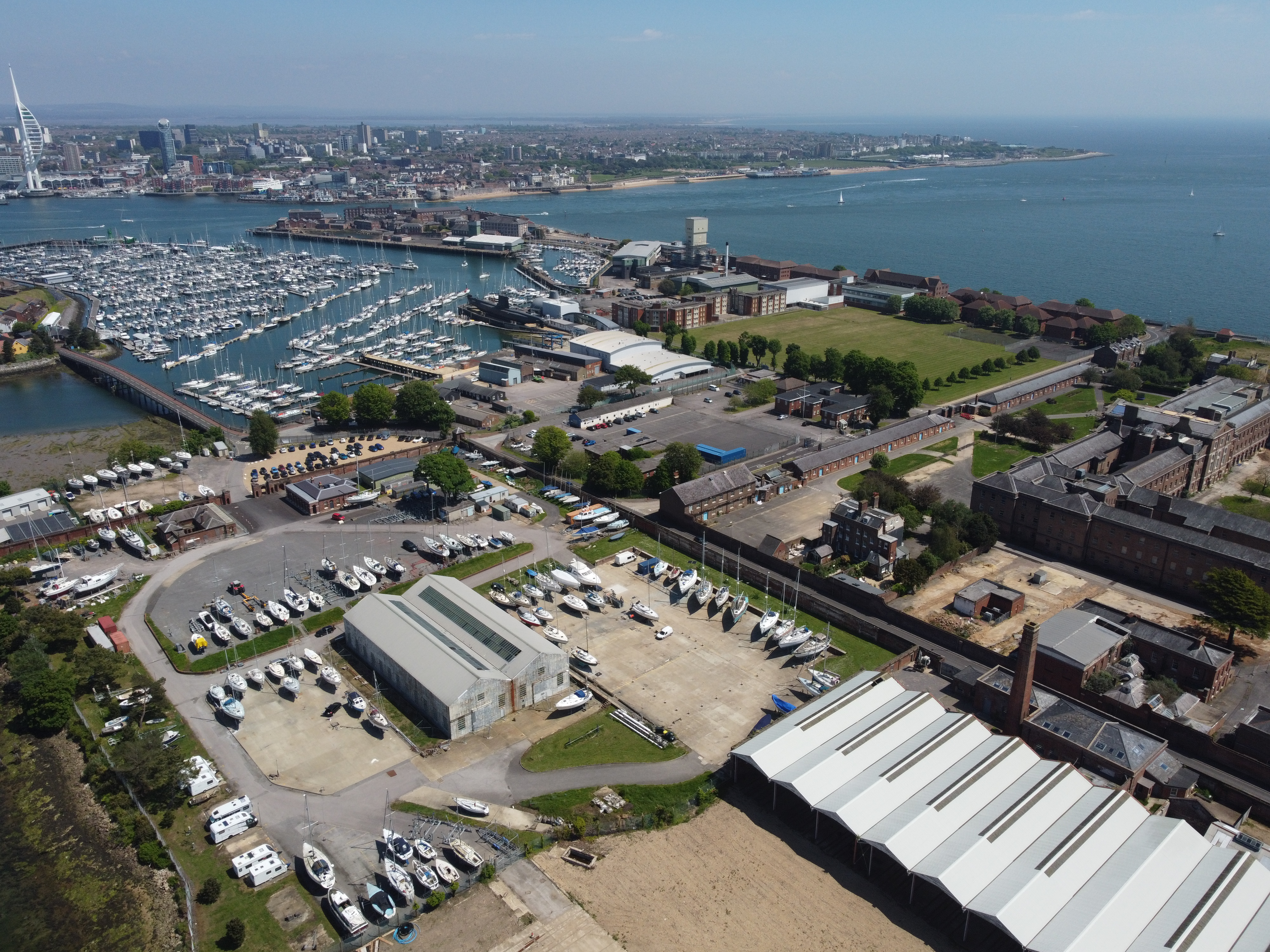
Aerial view showing Fort Blockhouse 3 (bottom left), Fort Blockhouse 2 (centre) and Fort Blockhouse 1 (above and to the right).

In the early 2020s Ministry of Defence (MOD) still owned three parcels of land on the Haslar Peninsula, which it termed Fort Blockhouse 1, Fort Blockhouse 2 and Fort Blockhouse 3: Blockhouse 1 is the fort itself and adjacent land to the south-west (including the SETT and recreation ground), Blockhouse 2 is the former HMS Hornet site and Blockhouse 3 is land north of Haslar Road (which had been annexed to HMS Hornet, having previously formed part of Haslar Gunboat Yard). As of 2022, according to the MOD, a number of 'non-military agencies, cadet forces and civilian associations' were still based at Fort Blockhouse, including: the Royal Naval Sailing Association (based at Blockhouse since the 1930s), Hornet Services Sailing Club, the Joint Services Adventurous Sail Training Centre, the Royal Navy Submarine Museum and local Sea Cadets and Air Training Corps units.

In 2015 Hornet Services Sailing Club signed a new lease on land and property at Fort Blockhouse 2 and 3, safeguarding its continued occupation of the site until at least 2065. Gosport Sea Cadets moved into new premises at Fort Blockhouse 3 in 2020, having signed a 25-year lease. In 2022 command of the Joint Services Adventurous Sail Training Centre, 'one of the largest providers of sail training in the world', was transferred from the Royal Navy to the Army, with a view to it continuing to provide offshore sailing experience from its base at Fort Blockhouse 2.

=== Planned disposal ===
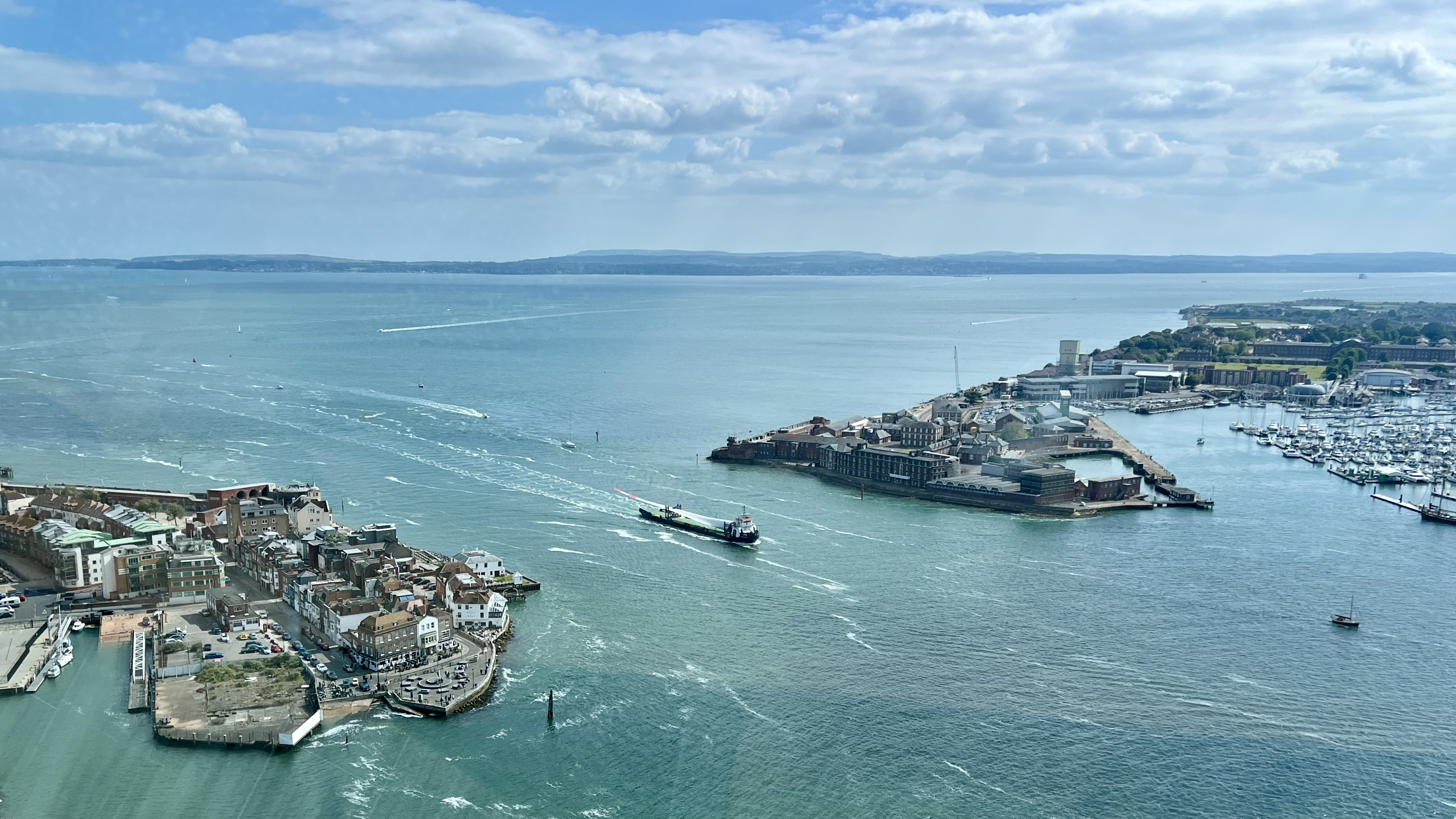
Fort Blockhouse (centre right) from the Spinnaker Tower, 2024.

In 2016, it was announced that Fort Blockhouse 1 would be disposed of by the Ministry of Defence in 2020, as part of a wider package of reductions in defence estate. Surveys were undertaken from January to March 2020 to determine which structures at the site would become listed buildings, and major job cuts took place at the end of the year. The disposal date was later extended to at least 2023, and once more to 2025. As of 2026 the fort remains in MoD ownership.
