= Royal Australian Navy School of Underwater Medicine =

Unit based in Sydney, Australia

The Royal Australian Navy School of Underwater Medicine (RANSUM) is an instructor-led training course based at Sydney, Australia.

== History ==
Before 1961 medical support at the diving section of HMAS Watson was provided by the District Medical Officer, Surgeon Lieutenant Commander Shane A.C. Watson, whose interest in diving led to research in injuries related to marine animals. Medical Director-General of the Royal Australian Navy, Surgeon Rear Admiral Lionel Lockwood, recognized the need for a specialisation in diving medicine and appointed Surgeon Lieutenant Commander Rex Gray to service in Underwater Medicine. Dr. Gray was an anaesthetist and accepted this commission on 20 February 1961.

Dr. Gray was trained as a diver and sent to England for seven months to learn about modern diving medicine. He visited the Royal Naval Medical School at Alverstoke, the R.N. Physiological Laboratory, the Submarine Training School at HMS Dolphin, Diving School HMS Vernon, and the RN Air Medical School at Seafield Park. Following his time in England, he travelled to the United States, where he spent two weeks each in the Experimental Diving Unit, Washington Navy Yard, and with the Medical Research Laboratory, Submarine Base, New London, Connecticut, returning to Australia in July, 1962, aboard HMAS Supply.

The first School of Underwater Medicine Report was issued in 1963 and outlined the need for communication with organizations with similar interests such as carbon monoxide poisoning and recompression chambers. The first eight-day Underwater Medicine course was held in May 1963, presented by Surgeon Lieutenant Commander A.A. Reid, and was followed by a thirteen-day course by Surgeon Lieutenant Commander B.M. Wadham, in June 1963.

== See also ==
- Hyperbaric medicine – Medical treatment at raised ambient pressure
- Saturation diving – Diving mode and decompression technique
