= Southsea Castle =

Castle in Portsmouth, Hampshire, England

- Portsea Island, Hampshire, England
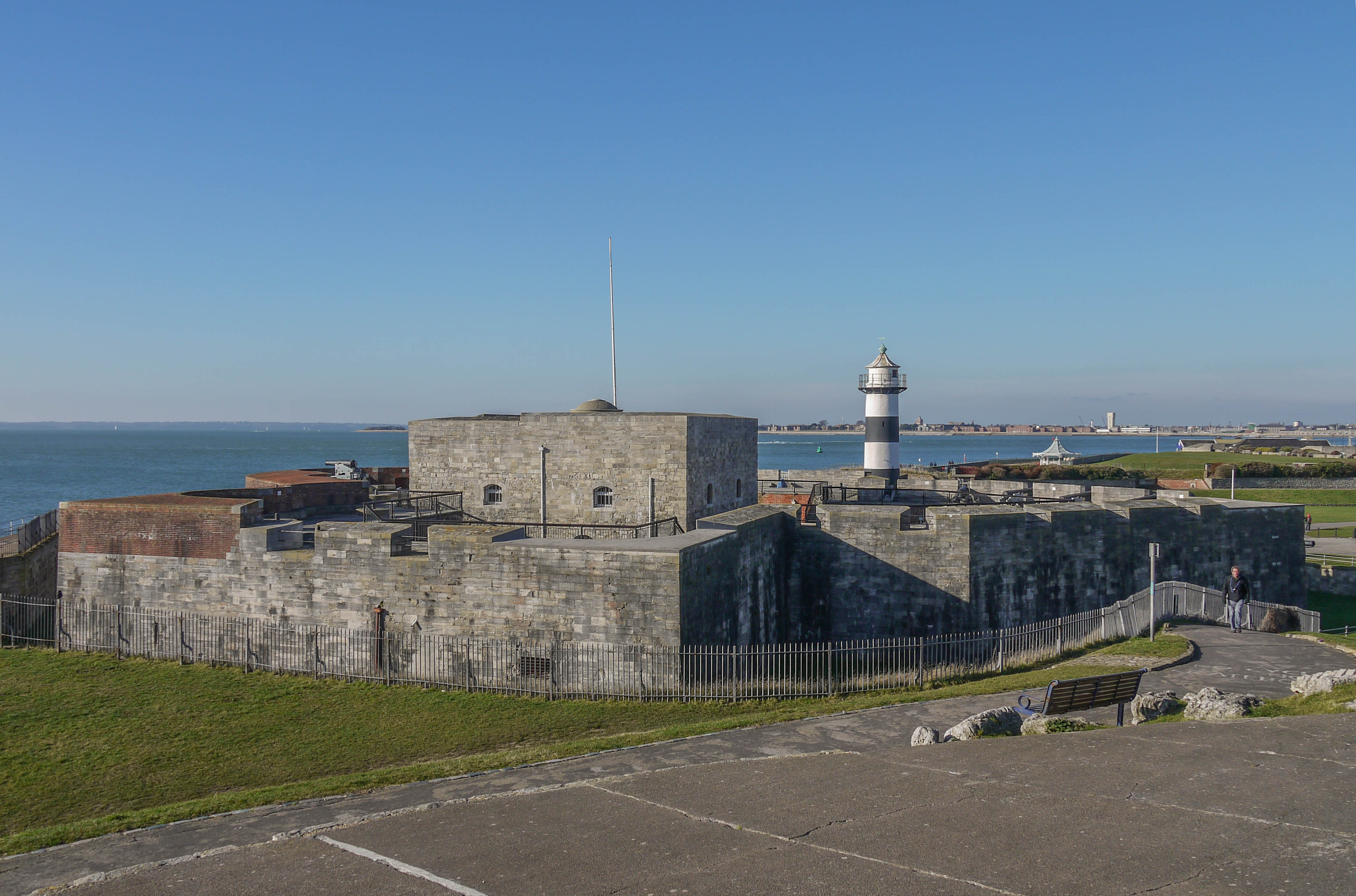

Site information
- Type: Device Fort
- Owner: Portsmouth City Council
- Open to the public: Yes
- Condition: Intact

Location
- Shown within Hampshire
- Location within Hampshire
- Coordinates: 50°46′41″N 1°05′20″W

Site history
- Built: 1544
- Materials: Stone
- Events: English Civil War; Second World War

Scheduled monument
- Reference no.: 1001869

Southsea Castle, historically also known as Chaderton Castle, South Castle and Portsea Castle, is an artillery fort originally constructed by Henry VIII on Portsea Island, Hampshire, in 1544. It formed part of the King's Device programme to protect against invasion from France and the Holy Roman Empire, and defended the Solent and the eastern approach to Portsmouth. The castle had a square central keep, two rectangular gun platforms to the east and west, and two angled bastions to the front and rear, and was an early English example of the trace italienne-style of fortification popular on the Continent. The Cowdray engraving of the Battle of the Solent in 1545 depicted Henry VIII visiting the castle. Despite several serious fires, it remained in service and saw brief action at the start of the English Civil War in 1642 when it was stormed by Parliamentary forces.

The castle was expanded in the 1680s by Sir Bernard de Gomme and, after a period of neglect in the 18th century, was redesigned again in 1814 during the Napoleonic Wars. After a brief period of use as a military prison in the 1840s, the fortification was expanded in the 1850s and 1860s with additional gun batteries on the east and west sides. The defences were upgraded throughout the century due to the fears of a French invasion and formed part of the plan for defending Portsmouth during the First World War. In the interwar years some of the fortifications were stood down, but the castle saw service again in the Second World War, when it was involved in Operation Grasp, the seizure of French naval vessels in Portsmouth Harbour. In 1960, Southsea Castle, by now obsolete, was sold to Portsmouth City Council. It was restored to its pre-1850 appearance and opened as a tourist attraction, receiving over 90,000 visitors from 2011–12.

== History ==
=== 16th century ===
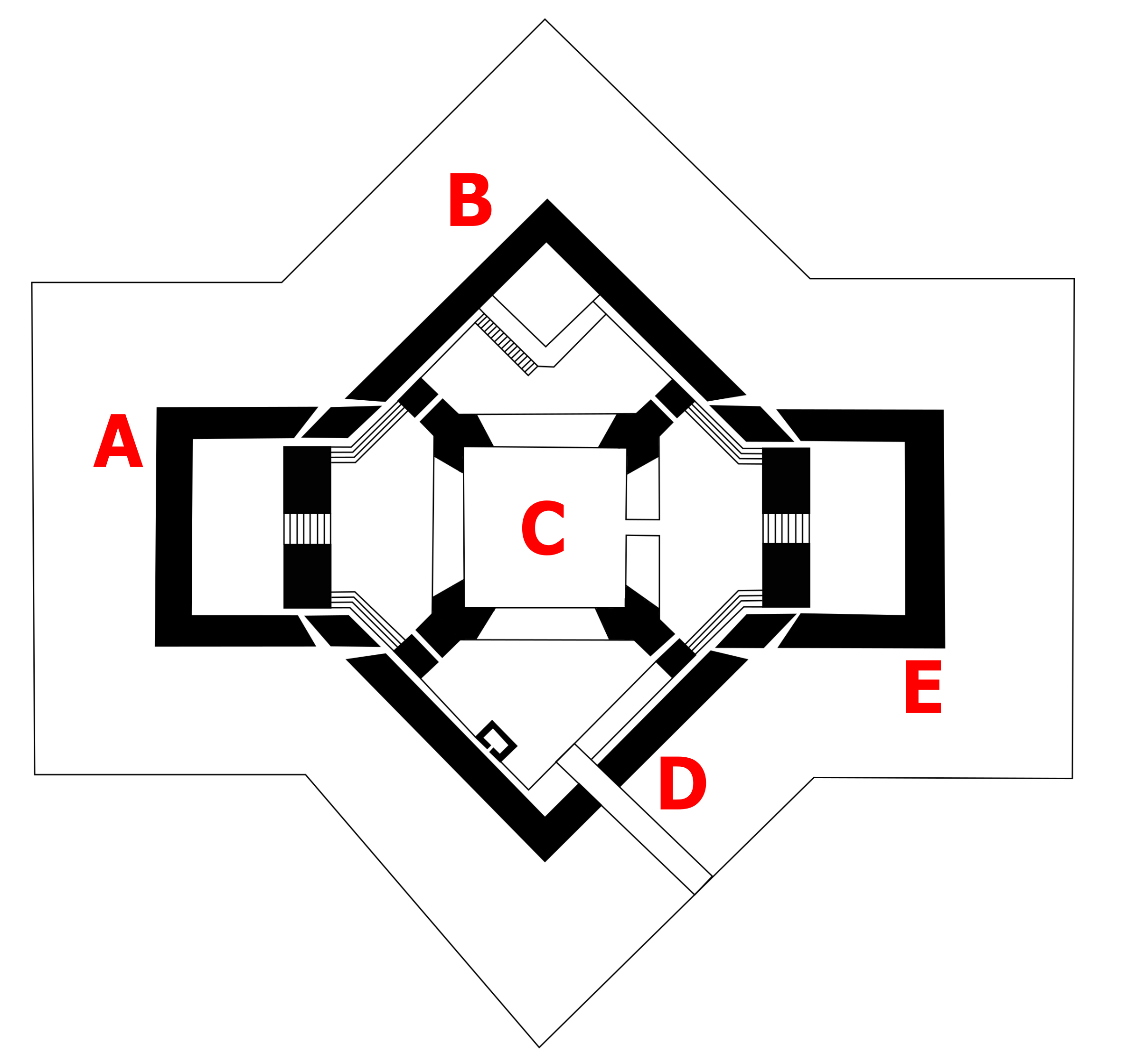
The castle from a 1577 plan; A - east gun platform; B - south bastion; C - keep; D - north bastion and bridge; E - west gun platform

Southsea Castle was built as a consequence of international tensions between England, France and the Holy Roman Empire in the final years of the reign of King Henry VIII. Traditionally the Crown had left coastal defences to local lords and communities, only taking a modest role in building and maintaining fortifications, and while France and the Empire remained in conflict, maritime raids were common but an actual invasion of England seemed unlikely. Modest defences based around simple blockhouses and towers existed in the south-west and along the Sussex coast, with a few more impressive works in the north of England, but in general the fortifications were limited in scale.

In 1533, Henry broke with Pope Paul III over the annulment of his long-standing marriage to Catherine of Aragon. Catherine was the aunt of Charles V, the Holy Roman Emperor, who took the annulment as a personal insult. This resulted in France and the Empire declaring an alliance against Henry in 1538, and the Pope encouraging the two countries to attack England. An invasion of England appeared certain. In response, Henry issued an order, called a "device", in 1539, giving instructions for the "defence of the realm in time of invasion" and the construction of forts along the English coastline. The immediate threat passed, but resurfaced in 1544, with France threatening an invasion across the Channel, backed by her allies in Scotland. Henry therefore issued another device to further improve the country's defences, particularly along the south coast.

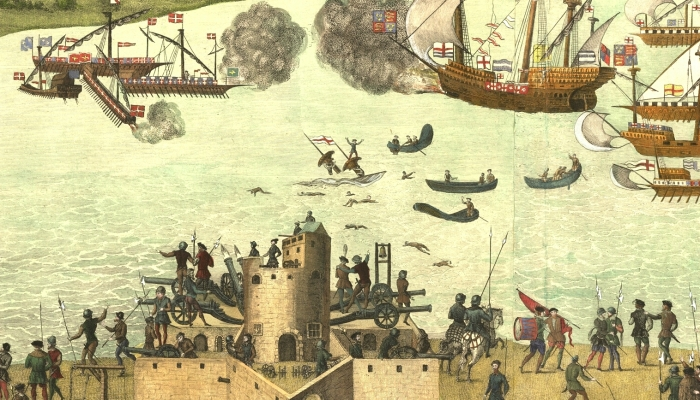
The Cowdray engraving of the castle during the Battle of the Solent, based on an original painting from between 1545–48

The castle was built on the southern end of Portsea Island to protect a deep-water channel running through the Solent to the royal naval base at Portsmouth. Work began in early 1544, under the overall direction of Sir Anthony Knyvett, the Governor of Portsmouth, supported by Richard Cawarden, the Dean of Chichester, and John Chatterton, the captain of the Portsmouth garrison; Thomas Bertie was appointed as the master mason. It is uncertain who designed the castle, although Knyvett described it as being "of his Majesty's own device", which typically indicated that the King had taken a personal role. The design abandoned the earlier use of semi-circular bastions, which could not be fully covered by flanking fire from the supporting walls, and instead used an angular design, forming an early, if imperfect, adoption of the trace italienne-style of fortification already in use in Continental Europe.

The work was carried out quickly due to the risk of a French attack, and by July two brass saker guns were mounted on the site. It cost at least £3,100, £1,300 of which came from the proceeds of the Dissolution of the Monasteries, with chalk, stone and timber being brought across from the neighbouring Isle of Wight. (Note: Comparing early modern costs and prices with those of the modern period is challenging. £3,100 in 1544 could be equivalent to between £1.3 million and £590 million in 2014 terms, depending on the price comparison used. £18,105 in 1814 could equate to between £1.17 million and £64.2 million. For comparison, the total royal expenditure on all the Device Forts across England between 1539 and 1547 came to £376,500, with St Mawes and Sandgate Castle, for example, costing ££5,018 and £5,584 apiece.) The castle was completed by October and formed a fortification with a square keep, rectangular gun platforms to the east and west, and angled bastions to the front and rear. Chatterton was appointed the new captain, with a team of eight soldiers, twelve gunners and a porter. The castle was well-armed, with seven brass artillery pieces - a culverin, demi-culverin, cannon and demi-cannon - and eight iron guns.

The French invasion emerged in 1545, when Admiral Claude d'Annebault crossed the Channel and arrived off the Solent with 200 ships on 19 July, landing troops on the Isle of Wight. Henry's fleet made a brief sortie, resulting in the Battle of the Solent, in which the English flagship, the Mary Rose, was lost, before retreating safely behind the protective fortifications. Henry was present in Portsmouth at the time and the Cowdray engraving of the battle depicts him visiting Southsea Castle. The French expedition moved further on along the coast on 25 July, bringing an end to the immediate invasion threat, but Henry gave orders for additional improvements to the fortification to be made that summer, including the construction of stone flankers and timber caponiers, to guard against a potential infantry attack. Edward VI spent a night at the castle in 1552 while inspecting the defences of Portsmouth.

=== 17th century ===
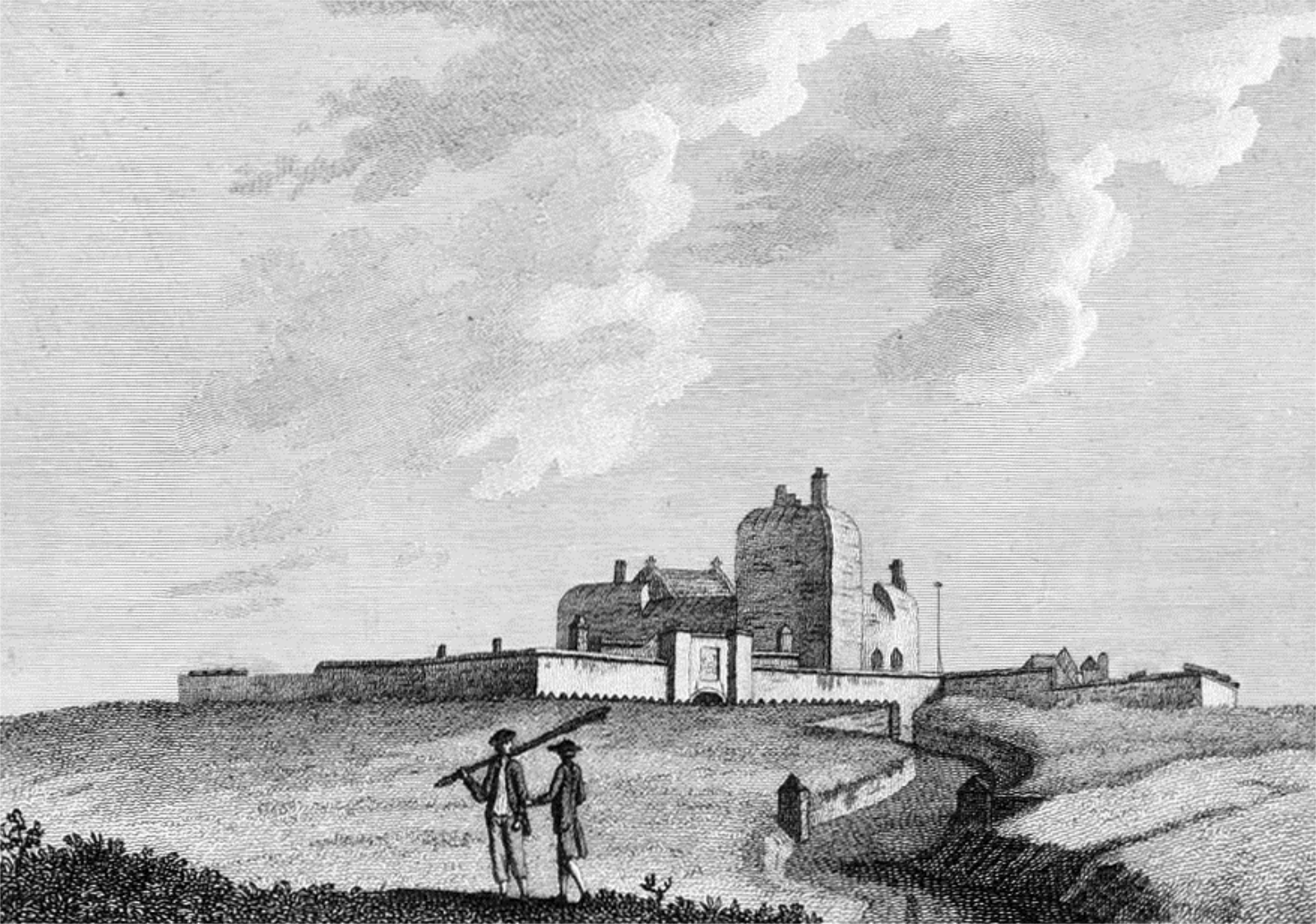
The castle in 1756, showing Sir Bernard de Gomme's improvements in the 1680s

In the early 1600s, England was at peace with France and Spain and as a result the coastal defences received little attention; a survey found Southsea Castle to be "verie ill prepared for defence", with no guns mounted along the walls or any stocks of powder. In March 1626, a serious fire broke out that destroyed the interior of the keep and generated panic among the ships moored nearby. The damage was not repaired until 1635, when 210 loads of timber was sent from the New Forest for use in the work. Another serious fire then broke out in 1640, causing damage to the lodgings and store rooms.

At the start of the English Civil War in 1642, fighting broke out around Portsmouth between the Royalist forces, led by Colonel George Goring, and Parliamentarians under the command of Colonel Richard Norton. Southsea Castle was held by the Royalist Captain Challoner, supported by a small garrison of eleven men and 14 guns, and Norton decided to attack the fortification with 400 infantry and two troops of cavalry. The assault took place in the early hours of the morning on 5 September; the garrison had positioned their guns to point inland, so the attackers stormed the moat on the seaward side. They then demanded that the garrison surrender but Challoner, who had been drinking heavily with Goring the night before, refused to discuss this and asked them to return later in the day. A fresh assault began and the garrison surrendered without loss of life. The capture of the castle left Portsmouth's position untenable and the town surrendered. A significant Parliamentarian garrison was then installed in the castle to keep it from being retaken.

The castle was primarily used as a prison during the interregnum and the early days of the Restoration. Concerns about a potential Dutch attack grew, however, and in 1665 King Charles II commissioned his Dutch-born master engineer, Sir Bernard de Gomme, to carry out a major scheme to improve the defences of Portsmouth, including Southsea Castle. Funding and poor organisation meant that the work did not begin until the 1680s. It included constructed an earthwork glacis around the castle; a new castle gate; four projecting turrets; and a redesign of the central keep. A large, stone plaque above the gatehouse entrance, bearing Charles' coat of arms, is dated 1683.

When opposition grew in 1688 against the Catholic King James II, the military establishment around Portsmouth was controlled by the King's illegitimate son, James FitzJames, the Duke of Berwick. Revolution broke out and for a period Portsmouth and its defences were important to the King as a potential exit route for the Royal Family to France; by late December, however, this route was no longer needed. George Legge, the Baron Dartmouth, pressurised FitzJames to hand over control of Southsea Castle to the Protestant Captain Carter on 18 December and Portsmouth surrendered to the revolution two days later. The traveller Celia Fiennes, who visited the castle in 1690, observed that it was "very fine, but I think it is but of little strength and service."

=== 18th – 19th centuries ===
Plan of the castle in 1834; A- south bastion; B - east platform; C - keep; D - west platform; E - north bastion; F - bank and counterscarp gallery

The east side of the castle was badly damaged in an explosion in August 1759, caused after cooking sparks fell onto gunpowder stored in the castle by the 72nd Regiment of Foot; 17 men, women and children were killed. Probably as a consequence of this event, a new powder store called the Firebarn was built outside the north side of the castle. By the second half of the century, the castle was in poor condition and, according to one contemporary account, only garrisoned by "an old sergeant and three or four men who sell cakes and ale". The Master–General of the Ordnance, Charles Lennox, the Duke of Richmond, reported in 1785 that it was "of too bad a form to deserve the expense necessary to repair it" and proposed building a more modern fort along the coast instead. By the end of the century, coastal erosion had destroyed most of the 18th-century grand battery.

With the outbreak of the Revolutionary and Napoleonic Wars at the end of the 18th century, Southsea Castle's importance increased once again. In 1797, a French invasion appeared imminent and the castle was urgently readied for action; only eight 32-pounder (14.5 kg) and five 6-pounder (2.7 kg) guns were available and these were in a poor condition. In 1813, work was begun to expand the castle, under the direction of Major-General Benjamin Fisher. Fisher had the work carried out by a mixture of soldiers and civilian contractors, arguing that it made it easier to contain costs and prevent union activity and the project cost an estimated £18,105. The fort was extended north by up to 30 feet (9.1 m), with the keep and interior bailey redesigned in brick. The moat was rebuilt and a counterscarp galley was built round the edge. Most of the work was finished by 1814 although the final elements were not completed until 1816.

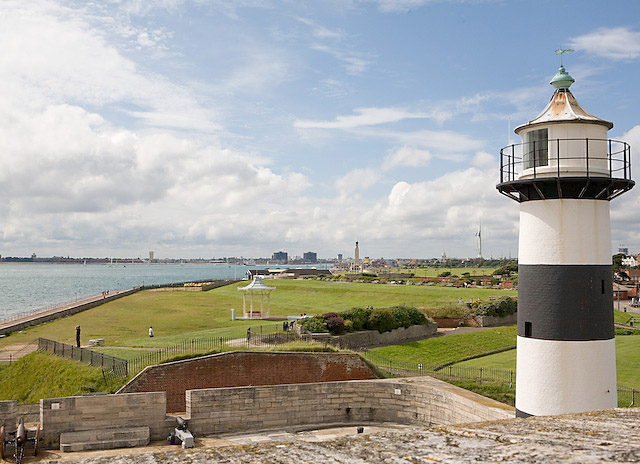
Looking west from the castle, past the lighthouse towards Portsmouth

A lighthouse, commissioned by the Admiralty, was constructed on the western gun platform in 1828. In 1854 its height was raised and it now stands at 34 feet (10 m) above its base atop the walls. The lamp burned sperm oil and was installed behind a fixed dioptric; it showed red and white sectors (red and green from 1854) to guide ships through the safe water between Horse Sand and Spit Sand. The lighthouse keeper was housed in the castle itself. The lighthouse was in continuous use until 2017, when it was superseded by a new structure as part of changes made to approaches to Portsmouth Harbour in preparation for the arrival of the Royal Navy's new Queen Elizabeth-class aircraft carriers. The original dioptric lens, which was subsequently replaced, is now on display inside the castle.

An 1837 enquiry had looked into the management of military offenders in the south of England and in 1844 it was decided to bring Southsea Castle and Fort Clarence into use as military prisons, to reduce the pressure on the civilian gaols in the area and to provide a more suitable military environment for the prisoners. Southsea was used as a prison until 1850, holding 150 offenders under the supervision of a Royal Artillery sergeant who also oversaw the remaining artillery defences.

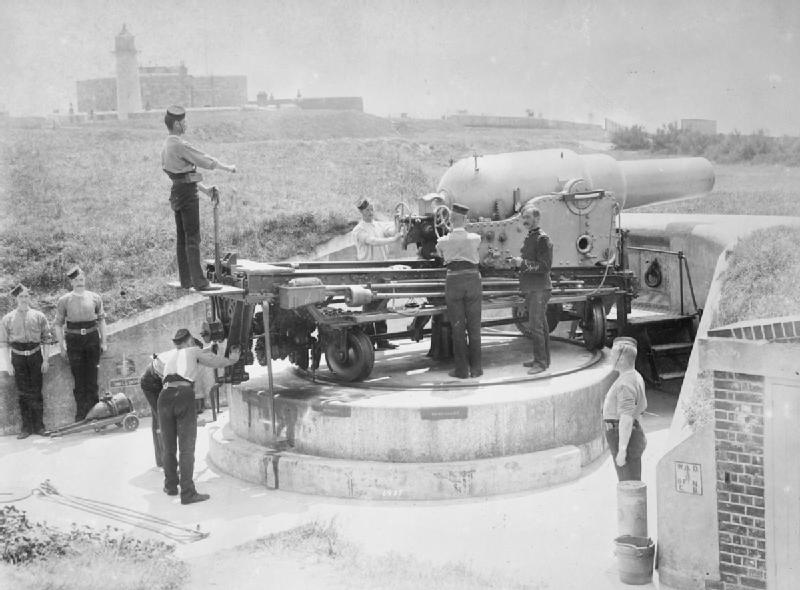
RML 9-inch 12 ton (22.8 cm 12,192 kg) gun emplacement in the west battery, c. 1890

The introduction of shell guns and steam ships in the 1840s created a new risk that the French might successfully attack along the south coast. In 1850, with the closure of the prison, seven 8-inch (22.3 cm) guns were mounted along the walls in brick emplacements, but there were concerns about the defences and two earthwork auxiliary batteries were built just alongside the castle to house additional guns. In 1856, at the end of the Crimean War, there was a large review of the fleet along the Solent, attended by Queen Victoria and numerous tourists. Naval gunboats launched a mock attack on the castle, which responded by firing a volley of forty 8-inch guns, causing chaos among the crowds watching around the base of the fortification.

Fresh worries about France, combined with the development of rifled cannon and iron-clad warships, led to the Royal Commission on the Defence of the United Kingdom expressing fears about the security of Portsmouth in 1860. Lieutenant-Colonel Jervois oversaw the broader programme of work across the country, and was supported at Southsea by Lieutenant-Colonel Fisher. New gun batteries with underground magazines were constructed on the west and east sides of the castle between 1863 and 1869 to form part of a 17-acre (6.9 ha) complex enclosed by a defensive wall; the old castle was used for range and direction finding, rather than to house weapons, and was left to slowly decline. By 1886, the site was well-armed, with 25 rifled, muzzle-loading guns and the design was praised by a visiting Russian military engineer.

By the 1890s, the castle's defences had become obsolete once again due to the development of torpedo boats and superior breech-loading guns. In response, five 6-pounder quick-firing guns and searchlights were installed to deal with the torpedo boat threat and, between 1899 and 1901, the east battery was converted to hold breech-loading guns at a cost of £16,670. (Note: £16,670 in 1901 equates to between £1.634 million and £15.84 million in 2014 terms, depending on the price comparison used. £35,000 in 1960 equates to between £720,000 and £2.4 million.)

Meanwhile, in 1785, the government had taken possession of Southsea Common, the marshland surrounding the castle, to ensure it remained open and accessible to the fort's guns, and convicts were deployed to fill in and flatten out the marshes from 1831 onwards. The surrounding area began to develop as an urban centre; seaside facilities were established at the start of the century and in the 1840s new private housing was built around the edge of the common, used by military and naval officers. The construction of a railway line from London enabled the settlement of Southsea, named after the castle, to turn into a prosperous resort. Southsea Common was leased by the local government in 1884 and, as the population grew, practising firing the castle's guns became more difficult.

=== 20th – 21st centuries ===
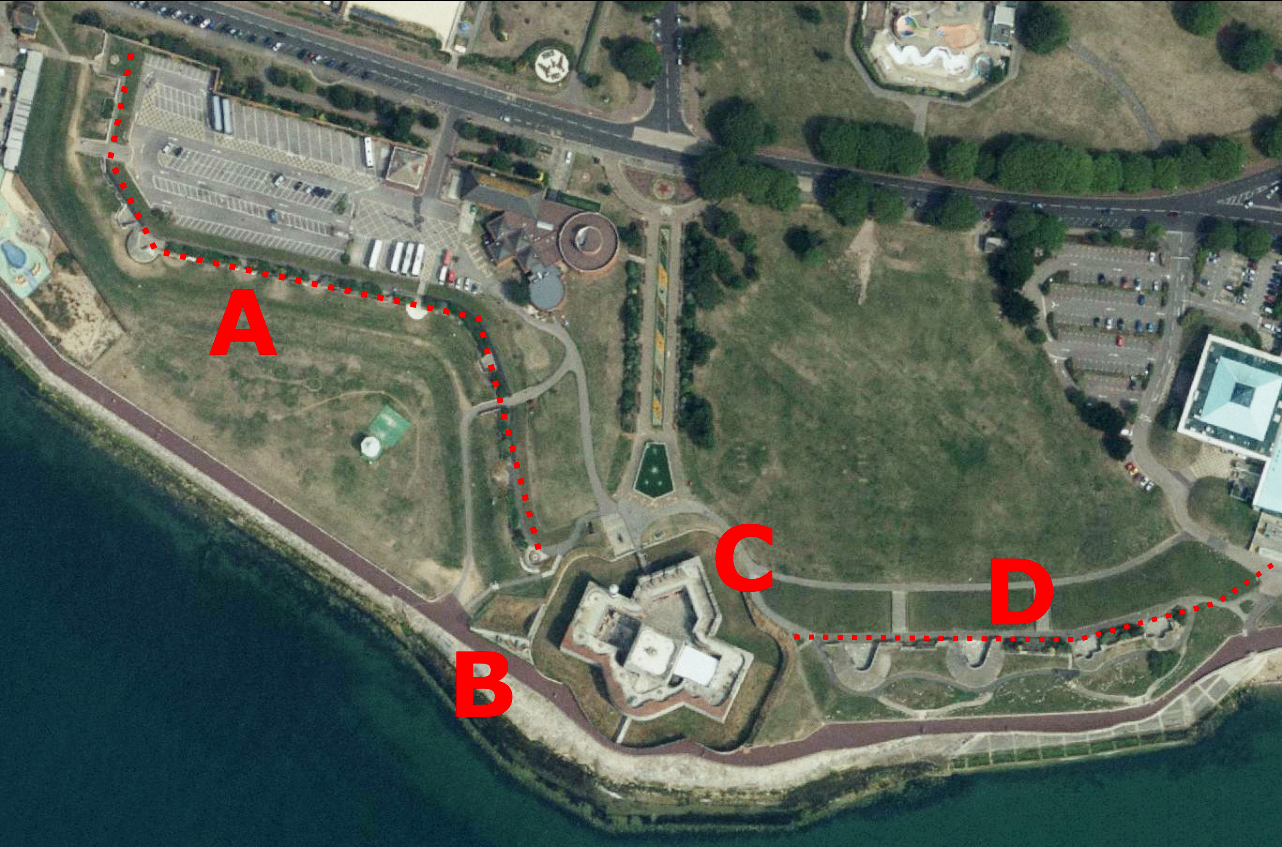
Aerial view of the modern site; A - west battery; B - west auxiliary battery; C - main castle; D - east battery; dashed line shows original shape of the batteries

At the start of the 20th century, Southsea Castle formed part of the "Fortress Portsmouth" plan for defending the Solent, the east battery equipped with two BL 6-inch (15.2 cm) Mark VII guns and two BL 9.2-inch (23.3 cm) Mark X guns, and the west battery armed with three 12-pounders (5.4 kg) and one 4.7-inch (11.9 cm) QF gun. During the First World War, the castle was at first manned by Royal Garrison Artillery and Number 4 company of the Hampshire Royal Garrison Artillery Territorials. Later these units were transferred to France and were replaced by the Hampshire Royal Garrison Artillery Volunteers. In response to the threat from German zeppelin raids, a QF 3-inch 20 cwt (10.9 cm 50.8 kg) anti-aircraft gun was added to the castle. Even though the castle remained in active military use after the conflict, by 1929 it had become a tourist attraction, and visitors were able to watch the castle garrison carry out practice firings out to sea. Southsea Common was bought by Portsmouth City Council in 1922 and turned into a park, while the west battery was disarmed in 1927.

During the Second World War, the Hampshire Heavy Regiment, Royal Artillery (Territorial Army), occupied the castle, which was used as the Headquarters Portsmouth Fixed Defences. During the war, the castle was manned by a range of units including coastal artillery from the regular army and the home guard, and the east battery was armed with two 9.2-inch BL Mark X guns. Living conditions were poor, with the keep described by one member of the Auxiliary Territorial Service as "cold and wet and horrible". The castle was protected by barrage balloons, but it was hit by at least two incendiary bombs which did little damage.

During the war, the castle was involved in an armed stand-off with French naval vessels. After the Fall of France in 1940, some of the French ships had made their way to British ports, including Portsmouth, but fears rose that the warships might leave and fall into German hands. On 23 June, the castle was ordered to man its guns and to be prepared to fire on the French navy to prevent their departure; one gun, albeit not ready for action, was levelled at the fleet and the French destroyer Léopard responded by aiming its guns at the castle, but no shooting ensued. On 3 July, under Operation Grasp, British forces boarded and seized the ships, ending the confrontation.

Southsea Castle was obsolete in the post-war years and in 1960 it was sold to Portsmouth City Council for £35,000. The council carried out restoration work and archaeological surveys, removing many of the later, post-1850 features and landscaping the surrounding area; in 1967 it was opened as a museum, although the lighthouse remained in operation. The west and east batteries were partially demolished by the council in the 1960s.

In the 21st century the castle is still operated as a tourist attraction by the council and received over 90,000 visitors from 2011–12. The castle houses a collection of cannon. Two of these, a 68-pounder (30.8 kg) and an RML 9-inch 12 ton (22.8 cm 12,192 kg) gun, are located in the grounds, and within the castle itself is a 24-pounder (10.8 kg) from HMS Royal George, an RML 9-pounder 8 cwt (4 kg 406 kg) and two hexagonally rifled Witworth 3-pounder (1.3 kg) breech-loaders dating from 1876. The castle is protected under UK law as a Scheduled Ancient Monument.

== See also ==
- Fortifications of Portsmouth

== Bibliography ==
- Anonymous (28 April 1856). "The Great Naval Review". The Observer: 2. OCLC 663097245.
- Bettey, J. H. (2014) [1996]. Wessex From AD 1000. London, UK: Routledge. ISBN 978-0-85372-809-2.
- Biddle, Martin; Hiller, Jonathon; Scott, Ian; Streeten, Anthony (2001). Henry VIII's Coastal Artillery Fort at Camber Castle, Rye, East Sussex: An Archaeological Structural and Historical Investigation. Oxford, UK: Oxbow Books. ISBN 0904220230.
- Brooks, Stephen (1996). Southsea Castle. Andover, UK: Pitkin Guides. ISBN 0-85372-809-7.
- Boxell, A. L. (2010). The Ordnance of Southsea Castle. Portsmouth, UK: Tricorn Books. ISBN 978-0-9562498-4-5.
- Childs, John (1980). The Army, James II, and the Glorious Revolution. Manchester, UK: Manchester University Press. ISBN 9780312049492.
- Coad, J. G. (1985). "Hurst Castle: The Evolution of a Tudor Fortress 1790–1945". Post-Medieval Archaeology. 19: 63–104. doi:10.1179/pma.1985.005. OCLC 60626429.
- Colvin, H. M.; Ransome, D. R.; Summerson (1982). The History of the King's Works: 1485–1660. Vol. IV. part 2. London, UK: HMSO. ISBN 0116708328.
- Corney, Arthur (1965). Fortifications in Old Portsmouth: A Guide. Portsmouth, UK: Portsmouth City Museums. OCLC 24435157.
- Corney, Arthur (1968). Southsea Castle. Portsmouth, UK: Portsmouth City Council. OCLC 504812915.
- Hale, J. R. (1983). Renaissance War Studies. London, UK: Hambledon Press. ISBN 0907628176.
- Harrington, Peter (2007). The Castles of Henry VIII. Oxford, UK: Osprey. ISBN 9781472803801.
- Inspectors of Prisons of Great Britain (1849). Fourteenth Report of the Inspectors Appointed under the Provisions of the Act 5 & 6 Will. IV. c. 38, to Visit the Different prisons of Great Britain: II. Midland and Eastern District. London, UK: HMSO. OCLC 941769727.
- King, D. J. Cathcart (1991). The Castle in England and Wales: An Interpretative History. London, UK: Routledge Press. ISBN 9780415003506.
- Lloyd, David. W. (1974). Buildings of Portsmouth and its Environs. Portsmouth, UK: City of Portsmouth. OCLC 2394054.
- Miller, John (2007). Cities Divided: Politics and Religion in English Provincial Towns, 1660–1722. Oxford, UK: Oxford University Press. ISBN 978-0-19-928839-7.
- Moore, Pam (1988). The Industrial Heritage of Hampshire and the Isle of Wight. Chichester, UK: Phillimore. ISBN 0-85033-665-1.
- Morley, B. M. (1976). Henry VIII and the Development of Coastal Defence. London, UK: Her Majesty's Stationery Office. ISBN 0116707771.
- Murfett, Malcolm H. (2009). Naval Warfare 1919–45: An Operational History of the Volatile War at Sea. Abingdon, UK: Routledge. ISBN 9781134048137.
- Osborne, Mike (2011). Defending Hampshire The Military Landscape from Prehistory to the Present. Stroud, UK: The History Press. ISBN 9780752459868.
- Potter, Henry (2011). Henry VIII and Francis I: The Final Conflict, 1540–47. Leiden, the Netherlands: Koninklijke Brill NV. ISBN 9789004204317.
- Quail, Sarah (2000). Southsea Past. Chichester, UK: Phillimore. ISBN 1-86077-145-9.
- Saunders, Andrew (1989). Fortress Britain: Artillery Fortifications in the British Isles and Ireland. Liphook, UK: Beaufort. ISBN 1855120003.
- Thompson, M. W. (1987). The Decline of the Castle. Cambridge, UK: Cambridge University Press. ISBN 1854226088.
- Tucker, Spencer C. (2004). The Second World War. Basingstoke, UK: Palgrave Macmillan. ISBN 9780230629660.
- Walton, Steven A. (2010). "State Building Through Building for the State: Foreign and Domestic Expertise in Tudor Fortification". Osiris. 25 (1): 66–84. doi:10.1086/657263. ISSN 0369-7827. S2CID 144384757.
- Webb, John (1977). The Siege of Portsmouth in the Civil War. Portsmouth, UK: Portsmouth City Council. ISBN 0-901559-33-4.
- Wragg, David W. (2007). Sink the French: The French Navy After the Fall of France 1940. Barnsley, UK: Pen and Sword. ISBN 9781844155224.
