= Rowallan Division =

Rowallan Division was a Royal Navy training course based at HMS Raleigh between 1980 and 1981. It assisted the Royal Navy in grooming failed candidates from the Admiralty Interview Board who lacked the appropriate leadership qualities and personal robustness to qualify for Midshipman training at BRNC Dartmouth. A rather severe 12-week character building and development course was used to attempt to rectify this lack.

== Background ==
Lord Rowallan was a member of the rich Polson Family who had strong links with the Baden Powell Family. They resided just south of Glasgow at Rowallan.

His grandfather's and father's interest in the great outdoors generated an interest in outward bound activities. Before the war, he was involved in Scouting and the setting up of a Juvenile delinquent/criminal rehabilitation centre based on outbound activities.

He served during the First World War and despite a leg injury, contrived to serve in WW2. He established and was part of a company which formed part of the British Expeditionary force, evacuated from Dunkirk in May–June 1940. It was realised soon after that in order to win the war Britain needed a larger quantity of capable officers, as the failure rate on officer selection was high around 65%, and a large invasion force was going to be required.

Lord Rowallan was charged with setting something up based on the success of his rehabilitation courses. This resulted in the establishment of the Highland Fieldcraft Training Centre (HFTC), at Feshie Bridge, Cairngorms, in the Highland and Island area of Scotland.

Post war in 1977 the Army's Regular Commissions Board was again suffering a high failure rate (70%+) at Officer Selection and Training, and during research rediscovered the HFTC success and established a Rowallan Company at RMA Sandhurst.

In the late 1970s the Royal Navy and the Royal Marines found themselves in a similar but slightly different position to the Army. While applications for commissioned entry were reasonably stable many of the young men who appeared before the Admiralty Interview Board were judged to lack either the self confidence or the maturity to undergo training immediately after AIB at either the Britannia Royal Navy College, Dartmouth or at the Commando Training Centre Royal Marines, Lympstone

The RMA Sandhurst Rowallan course was adapted as a model for the RN/RM’s Rowallan Division at HMS Raleigh and was refined and shaped to better meet the needs of the service and, for every individual who was selected for this intensive course of leadership training, confidence and team building. Only two Royal Marines cadets ever undertook Rowallan Division and so the course syllabus was primarily focused on preparing young Cadets for entry to BRNC, Dartmouth. The Commandant General Royal Marines accepted the Navy Board’s invitation to establish and lead the RN’s Rowallan Division and committed over 50% of the staff to command and run this course of training given the RM’s particular expertise and experience in command and leadership training.

== Directing staff ==
Senior Staff List:

- Major Rick Wiliams MBE WKhM RM - Officer Commanding
- Lieutenant Commander John Lippiett MBE RN - Training Officer
- Warrant Officer Class 2 David Langley RM - Divisional Sergeant Major
- Chief Petty Officer David Attenborough - Stores & Support
- Petty Officer (PT) Michael "Nick" Carter - Instructor
- Sergeant Colin Grice - Instructor
- Sergeant Paul Pitcher - Instructor

Other members of staff included two Royal Marines whose duties included driving and who delivered overwatch safety protocols when activities were conducted in the field, a Royal Navy chef to cook for staff in the field and a WRNS Leading Writer who assisted the Division's Sergeant Major with administration. An Instructor Officer was attached to the Division on an occasional basis to assist in the supervision of academic studies.

The emblem of Rowallan Division was the head of a highland stag.

== Course structure ==
Students on the course were given the nominal rank of Cadet and were paid the equivalent of a new entry junior sailor.

The course schedule was not given to Cadets who were effectively at 30 minutes notice to move at all times. Generally the Division spent alternating weeks either in the field or in HMS Raleigh.

When at Raleigh there were generally 2 or 3 sessions of Physical Training per day along with Practical Leadership Tasks. Emphasis during training was also given to improving Cadets’ written and verbal communication skills with the purpose of improving their self confidence when addressing or briefing others. When it was necessary, individual/one on one Lecturing skills training was carried out that proved to be highly successful. Training activities in the field were conducted such as map reading, navigation, first aid, basic RT procedures and survival skills. The Physical Training included gymnasium work, obstacle courses and speed marches (often with loaded Bergens) to improve Cadets’ levels of physical fitness. ‘Log runs’ were conducted where teams of Cadets raced each other while each team carried a telegraph pole sized log - these were frequent events that all formed part of Rowallan's team building ethos. This paragraph was edited by an unknown user who seems to have first hand knowledge, the words he added at this point are "Did me no harm at all. Excellent lifetime experience.".

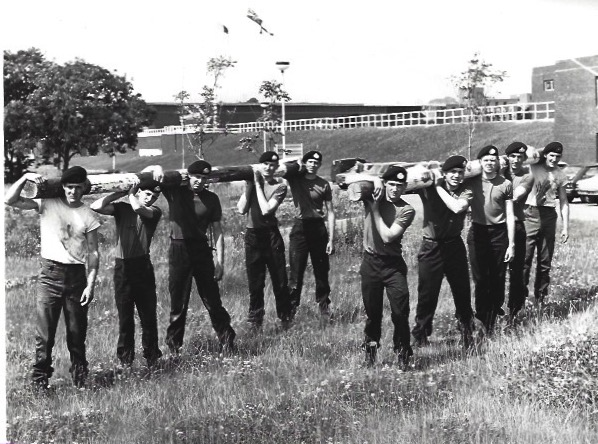
Course 1 After completion of a log run, RN cadets wear red t-shirts, the cadets front left and rear right are RM cadets and wear white t-shirts. An order to fall in wearing red t-shirts always signified a log run was imminent.

The Division conducted many exercises in the field and used Dartmoor, Bodmin Moor, Snowdonia and the Brecon Beacons (including the Pen y Fan horseshoe). These exercises progressed through increasing levels of physical and mental duress while requiring Cadets to be individually selected at random intervals to plan, manage and organise a particular task that required innovation, imagination, demonstration of a command ability and good communication skills with the team. Cadets became very adept to ‘expect the unexpected’ that, with the background of their leadership training, assisted them in being able to think and act decisively when under duress. Where environmental conditions required it as a matter of safety, cadets were issued with the then in service Clansman combat net radio system. In early exercises Cadets slept in tents and ate standard 24-hour ration packs. In later exercises cadets had to make improvised shelters (bivouacs) and were supplied with live rations in the form of hens and rabbits which had to be killed humanely under instruction and prepared by hand. Frequently crash moves of camps where trainees were ordered to immediately relocate would be initiated by the directing staff usually in the dark of night.

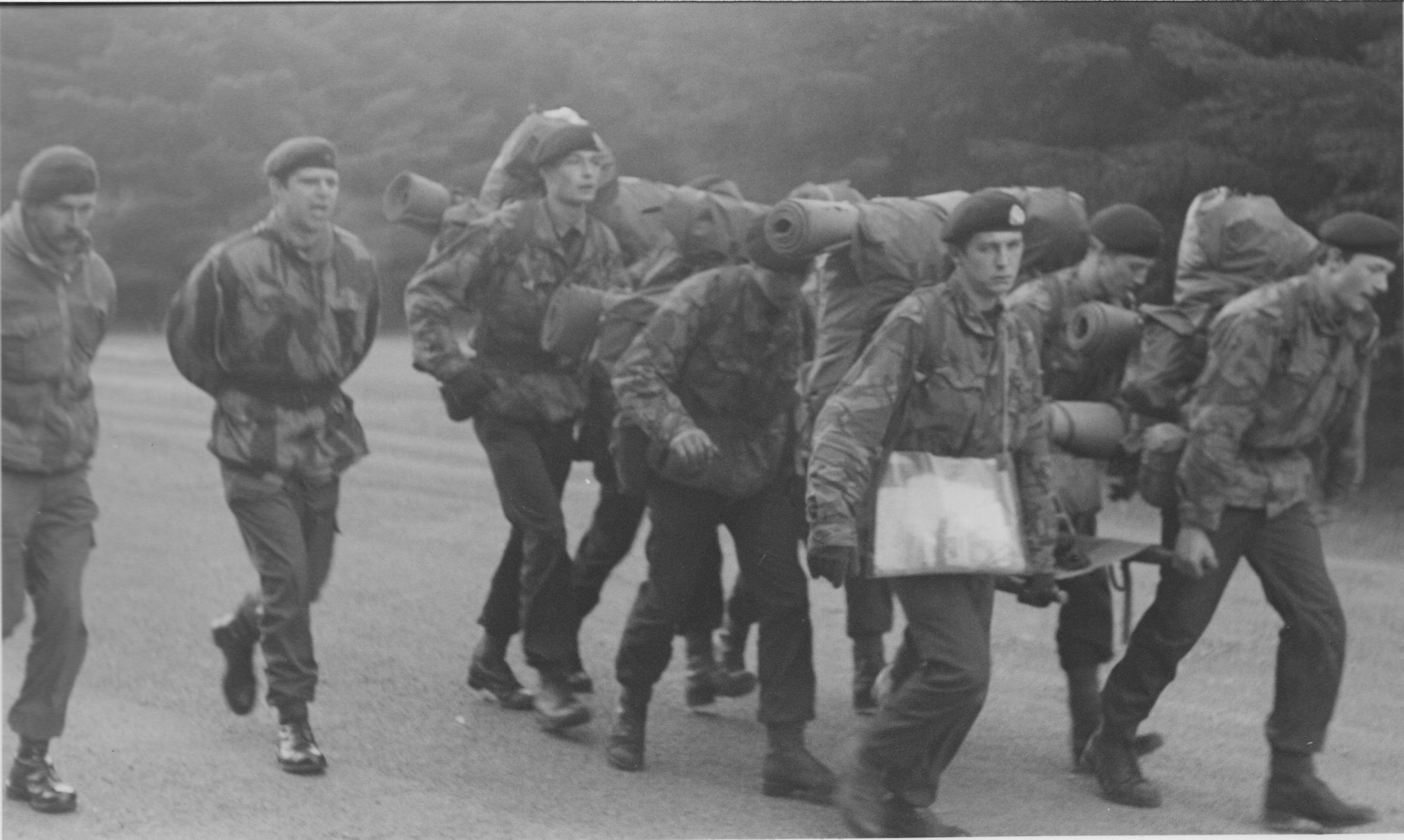
Course 3 During a Stretcher Race. This evolution was part of one of the weeks spent in the field, the cadets are carrying heavily laden Bergens and would be sleeping in bivouacs. Far left are 2 members of the Directing Staff both with very shiny DMS boots.

Towards the end of the course, greater emphasis was given to the preparation and delivery of more classroom orientated activities such as short briefs, lecturing and improving written communication skills and attending informal lectures from external speakers who had a record of excellence of leadership or personal achievement in their own areas of personal endeavour.

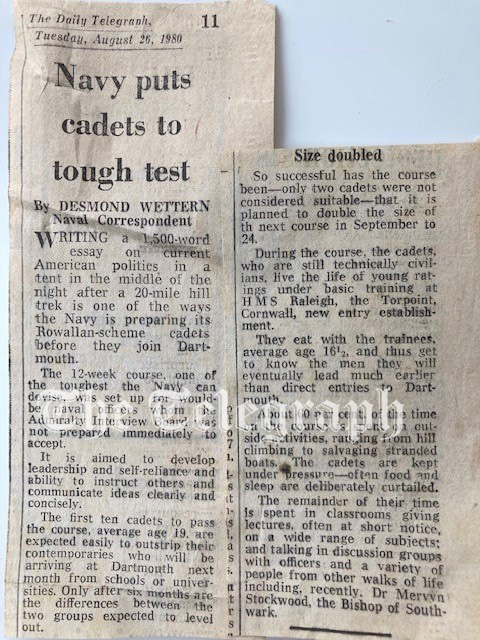
The Daily Telegraph Article dated 26 August 1980. Republished with permission from Telegraph Media Group Limited.

== List of courses ==
Course Number	Cadets Commencing	Cadets Completing	Success Rate	Notes
1	12	10	83%	^{1}
2	24	14	58%	
3	18	16	88%	^{2}

Notes:

^{1} Course uniquely included two Royal Marines Cadets who both successfully completed Rowallan Division and went on to CTCRM Lympstone.

^{2} Course included Cadet Gary Pettitt who went on to attain the rank of Captain in the Royal Navy and Cadet Pete Williams who became a Commander.

== Course closure ==
The course was disbanded in 1981 due to MOD cost savings measures but, in the short time that it existed, Rowallan Division had served its purpose well in graduating significantly more young men into BRNC than would otherwise have been the case

A reunion was held in 2015 in the form of a Mess Dinner at HMS Raleigh.
