= HMS Dolphin (shore establishment) =

Former shore establishment of the Royal Navy

Coordinates: 50°47′16″N 1°7′4″W

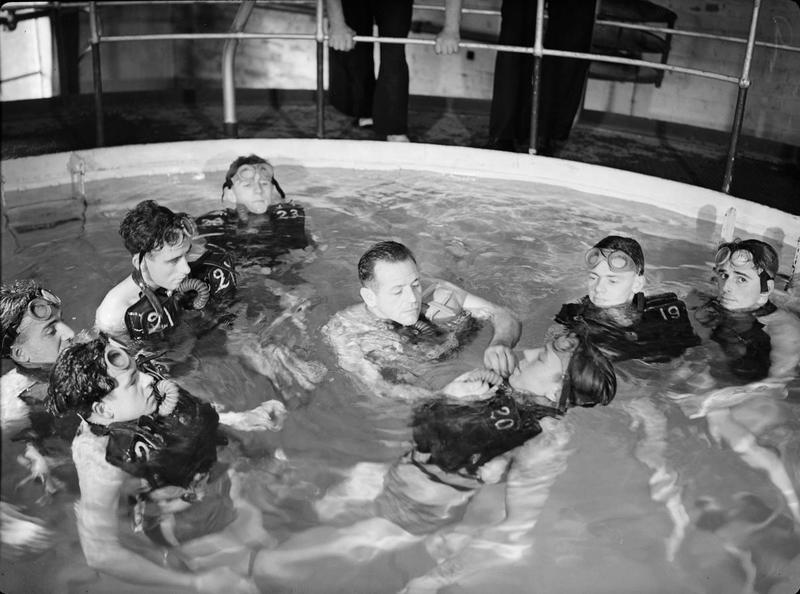
Davis Submerged Escape Apparatus training at HMS Dolphin

The seventeenth Royal Navy vessel to be named HMS Dolphin was the Royal Naval shore establishment sited at Fort Blockhouse in Gosport. Dolphin was the home of the Royal Navy Submarine Service from 1904 to 1999, and location of the Royal Navy Submarine School.

== Closure of submarine base ==
The blockhouse and fortifications of the site had been constructed from the 14th century onwards, but in the late nineteenth century, it was deemed surplus by the Royal Commission, and was handed over to the Royal Navy in 1904. The navy set about expanding the site by added new blocks and accommodation for various ranks, and the base became an independent command in August 1912. Originally it was known simply as Haslar Submarine Base, but was renamed as HMS Dolphin sometime after 1907, when the last ship to be called HMS Dolphin was brought to the site to provide extra accommodation. Heavy bombing during the Second World War on Gosport and Portsmouth, saw the submarine training school moved to Blyth in Northumberland as HMS Elfin.

HMS Dolphin closed as a submarine base on 30 September 1998, although the last RN submarine permanently based at Gosport was HMS Opossum which had left five years earlier in 1993. The Royal Navy Submarine School (RNSMS) remained at Dolphin until 23 December 1999 when it closed prior to relocation to HMS Raleigh at Torpoint in Cornwall. The RNSMS staff marched into HMS Raleigh and were welcomed on board by Commodore Lockwood on 31 January 2000. The RNSMS is located in the Dolphin and Astute blocks at Raleigh, although the Submarine Escape Training Tank (SETT), a 30-metre (98 ft) deep tank of water used to instruct all RN submariners in pressurised escape, remained active at the same site, now renamed Fort Blockhouse, until early 2020, when it was replaced with a newer training facility at HM Naval Base Clyde.

== Submarine museum ==
The Royal Navy Submarine Museum is still sited nearby on Haslar Jetty Road next to Fort Blockhouse and Royal Naval Hospital Haslar.

== Notable personnel ==
- Jimmy Scoular, served at the base as an engineer
- Sandy Woodward, served at the base in the early 1960s
- Captain Tubby Crawford, flag officer at the base in the early 1960s
