= HMS Raleigh (shore establishment) =

Stone frigate at Torpoint, Cornwall, United Kingdom

HMS Raleigh
- Torpoint, Cornwall in England
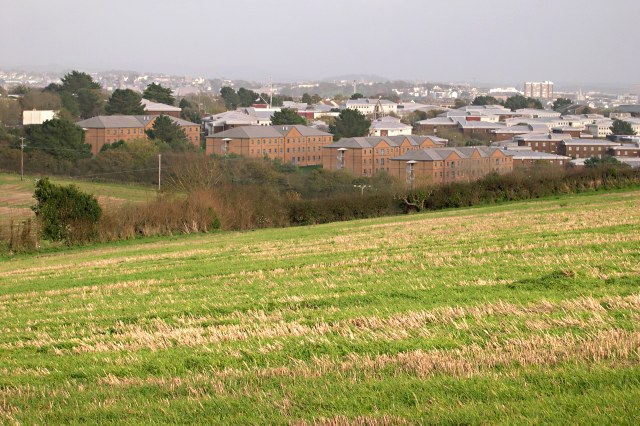
- Accommodation blocks at HMS Raleigh

Site information
- Type: Naval training establishment
- Owner: Ministry of Defence
- Operator: Royal Navy
- Condition: Operational
- Website: Official website

Location
- Location in Cornwall
- Coordinates: 50.3739°N 4.2227°W
- Area: 331 hectares (820 acres)

Site history
- Built: 1940
- In use: 1940 – present

Garrison information
- Current commander: Colonel (Royal Marine) Colonel Chris Hall MBE

HMS Raleigh is a stone frigate (shore establishment), serving as the basic training facility of the Royal Navy at Torpoint, Cornwall, United Kingdom. It is spread over several square miles, and has damage control simulators and fire-fighting training facilities, as well as a permanently moored training ship, the former HMS Brecon. Its principal function is the delivery of both New Entry Training and Basic Training.

== History ==
HMS Raleigh was commissioned on 9 January 1940 as a training establishment for Ordinary Seamen following the Military Training Act which required that all males aged 20 and 21 years old be called up for six months full-time military training, and then transferred to the reserve.

During the Second World War, 44 sailors and 21 Royal Engineers were killed when a German bomb hit the air-raid shelter they were in at Raleigh on 28 April 1941. In 1944, the United States Navy took over the base to use as an embarkation centre prior to the Invasion of Normandy. Raleigh was transferred back to the Royal Navy in July 1944 to continue training seamen.

Early in 1950, the base became the new entry and engineering training establishment for stoker mechanics. The cruiser HMS Newfoundland was used for "onboard training, boiler room, auxiliary machinery, ships boats etc". The base was modernised in the 1970s, and in the early 1980s, Raleigh took on the Part I training for the Women's Royal Naval Service, and Artificer Apprentices as well as adding the Royal Naval Supply School. These had previously taken place at HMS Dauntless, HMS Fisgard and HMS Pembroke respectively. Briefly between 1980 and 1981 it was home to Rowallan Division providing training before entry to BRNC Dartmouth. In 1990, the training of male and female recruits was merged, and over the following ten years the base absorbed the Cookery School (from the Army Catering Corps headquarters) and the Submarine School from HMS Dolphin.

In 2007, phase one training for all new Royal Navy recruits was increased from eight to nine weeks and subsequently ten. Each Recruit was allocated to one of the following Divisions: Cornwell (named after Jack Cornwell VC), Cunningham (named after Andrew Cunningham, 1st Viscount Cunningham of Hyndhope), Fisher (named after John Fisher, 1st Baron Fisher), Gould (named after Thomas William Gould VC), Hanson (named after Shaun Hanson, an Acting Steward who was onboard HMS Ardent during the Falklands War), Nelson (named after Horatio Nelson, 1st Viscount Nelson) and Neptune (named after the cruiser HMS Neptune), and Corporate (named after Operation Corporate).

HMS Raleigh was the home of Defence Maritime Logistics School (DMLS) prior to moving to Worthy Down Camp in 2020.

== Role ==
The base provides courses in military training, seamanship and submarine operations. It also delivers training for crews preparing for operational deployments. The base is also home to part of MWS (Maritime Warfare School) Triumph, the Seaman Specialist School, the Submarine School and HM Royal Marines Band Plymouth.

== Captain, New Entry Training Establishment (HMS Raleigh) ==
Post holders from October 1939 to August 2018 were:

- Rear-Admiral Charles Otway Alexander: October 1939 – March 1944
- Captain Harold Hickling: September 1944 – January 1945
- Captain Alexander H. Maxwell-Hyslop: January 1945 – June 1946
- Captain George F. Stevens-Guille: June 1946 – February 1948
- Captain Philip C. Taylor: February 1948 – May 1949
- Captain Iain G. Maclean: May 1949 – December 1950
- Captain William E.C. Davy: December 1950 – September 1953
- Captain Ivan O. Backhouse: September 1953 – June 1955
- Captain William G. Pulvertaft: June 1955 – July 1957
- Captain Archibald G. Forman: July 1957 – May 1959
- Captain John A. Osborne: May 1959 – June 1961
- Captain George C. Crowley: June 1961 – May 1963
- Captain Denis Jermain: May 1963 – February 1965
- Captain Peter White: February 1965 – March 1967
- Captain Peter G.R. Mitchell: March 1967 – February 1969
- Captain James F.R. Weir: February 1969 – April 1971
- Captain Malcolm C. Denman: April 1971 – July 1973
- Captain Henry E. Howard: July 1973 – February 1976
- Captain Robert W.F. Gerken: February 1976 – February 1978
- Captain Richard E. Lambert: February 1978 – October 1979
- Captain John Jacobsen: October 1979 – March 1982
- Captain Brian R. Outhwaite: March 1982 – February 1984
- Captain Brian T. Brown: February 1984–1985
- Captain Robert C.F. Hill: 1986–1987
- Captain Peter J. Grindal: October 1987–1989
- Captain John C.L. Wright: 1989–1991
- Captain Richard O. Irwin: April 1990 – October 1992
- Captain Peter A. Dunt: October 1992–1994
- Captain Richard A.Y. Bridges: 1994 – September 1995
- Commodore Hugh W. Rickard: September 1995–1998
- Commodore Roger G. Lockwood: 1998–2000
- Commodore Laurence P. Brokenshire: 2000 – July 2003
- Commodore David W. Pond: July 2003 – January 2006
- Commodore W. John Keegan: January 2006 – January 2008
- Commodore S. Jonathan Woodcock: January 2008 – December 2009
- Captain Stephen Murdoch: December 2009 – September 2012
- Captain Robert Fancy: September 2012 – September 2014
- Captain Robert J.A. Bellfield: September 2014 – September 2016
- Captain Eleanor L. Ablett: September 2016 – September 2018

Since 2018:

- Captain Richard Harris: September 2018 – August 2020
- Captain Suzi Nielsen: September 2020 – September 2022
- Captain Jane Roe: September 2022 – August 2025
- Captain Jeremy H. D. Ussher: August 2025 - May 2026
- Colonel Chris Hall: May 2026- present

== See also ==
- Naval Station Great Lakes, US equivalent
