= Cowdray engravings =

Paintings

The Cowdray Engravings
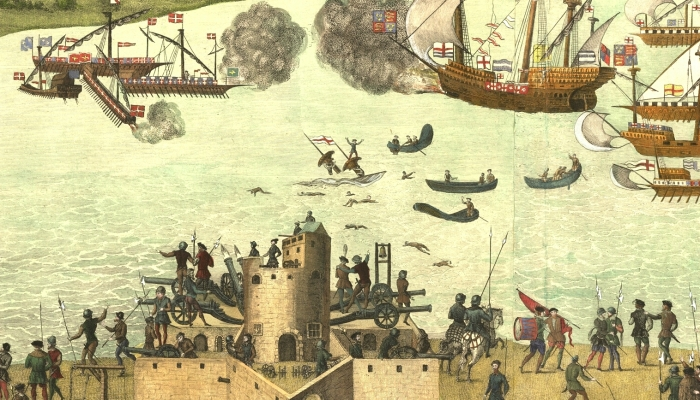

The Cowdray engravings comprise five 18th-century engravings of 16th-century wall-paintings, originally commissioned by Sir Anthony Browne. The original paintings were destroyed by fire in 1793.

== History ==
The Cowdray engravings are based on five paintings produced for Sir Anthony Browne, King Henry VIII's Master of the Horse. They were probably produced between 1545 and 1548 and were painted onto the walls of Browne's hall in Cowdray House. They showed key scenes in his life and might have been used by him when recounting stories during formal events. The painting included The Departure of King Henry VIII from Calais, The Encampment of King Henry VIII at Marquison, The Siege of Boulogne by King Henry VIII, The Encampment of the English forces near Portsmouth and The riding of King Edward VI from the Tower of London to Westminster.

Philip Yorke, the Earl of Hardwick and a keen antiquarian, proposed producing engravings of the paintings in the 1760s. His colleague, the antiquarian Sir Joseph Ayloffe, was spurred on by his interest and convinced the Society of Antiquaries to record them as engravings, as part of a longer series of historical prints produced by the society. The Encampment of the English Forces near Portsmouth was rendered as a watercolour by John and Charles Sherwin and then engraved by James Basire. Samuel Hieronymous Grimm copied the remaining four paintings which Basire then engraved. The engravings were published in 1788 with a print run of 400 copies, distributed to fellow of the society and sold to the public.

Cowdray House burnt down on 24 September 1793 and the paintings were mostly destroyed as the rendering came away from the walls, although some fragments may have survived for a few years after the fire. This left the engravings as the only record. The historian Bernard Nurse considers them to be "an important record of the sixteenth-century originals".

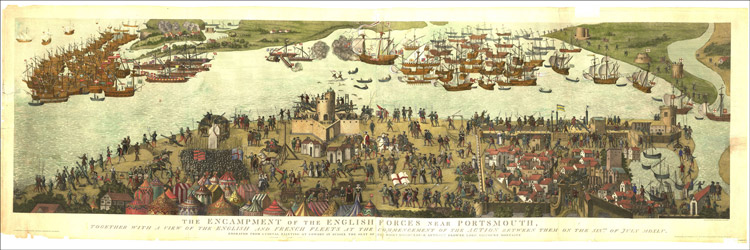
Engraving and watercolour version of The Encampment of the English forces near Portsmouth

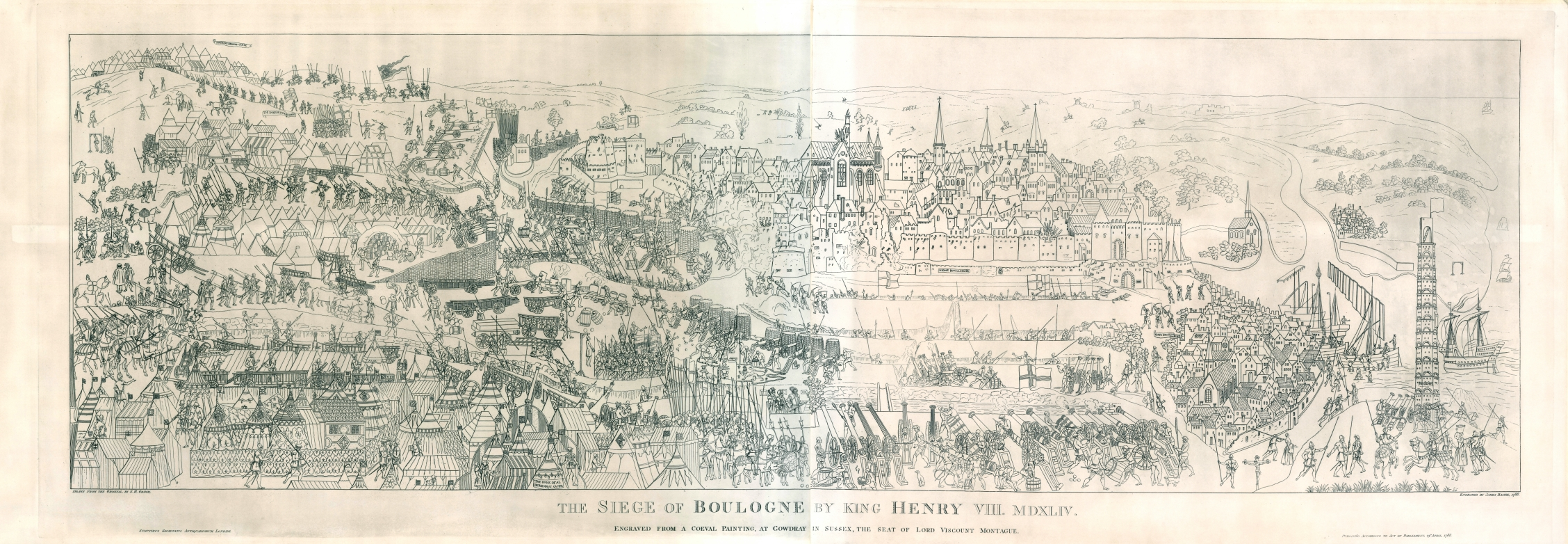
The Siege of Boulogne by King Henry VIII

== Bibliography ==
- Nurse, Bernard (2012). "The Sherwin Brothers' Copy of the Lost Mary Rose Wall Painting at Cowdray House". The Antiquaries Journal. 92: 371–384. doi:10.1017/s0003581512000108. S2CID 161297090.
