= Royal Navy Submarine School =

The Royal Navy Submarine School trains non-officer submariners and is located at HMS Raleigh at Torpoint in Cornwall. In 2017 a plan to relocate the school to HMNB Clyde was announced.

== See also ==
Submarine Command Course, The Perisher
