= Ian Eaves =

British consultant on arms and armour

- Born: Ian Donald Dietrich Eaves
- Occupations: Arms and armour researcher and consultant
- Known for: Catalogues of armour in the Royal Collection and in the Fitzwilliam Museum

Ian Donald Dietrich Eaves, MVO FSA, is a British researcher and consultant on arms and armour. He served as the Keeper of Armour at the Royal Armouries for eighteen years, from 1978 to 1996. Also starting in 1978, and continuing until 1983, he served as the editor of the Journal of the Arms & Armour Society; he was appointed the society's president in 1995, and as of 2026 serves as a vice-president emeritus. He has written and translated several articles for journals, including the society's.

As of 2019, Eaves works as a consultant on arms and armour, and has been commissioned to create several catalogues of large collections. In 2002 he published Catalogue of European Armour at the Fitzwilliam Museum, and in 2016 he coauthored the long-awaited Arms & Armour in the Collection of Her Majesty The Queen, a 528-page work which Eaves had been working on for more than a decade. He has also coauthored a volume of an illustrated miniature series, The Art of the Gun: European Firearms Masterpieces from the 17th to the 19th Centuries. Eaves's work as a consultant has also included duties for auction houses, including Sotheby's and Thomas Del Mar Limited.

Eaves has also collected armour himself; one of his former pieces is now owned by the Metropolitan Museum of Art.

== Career ==
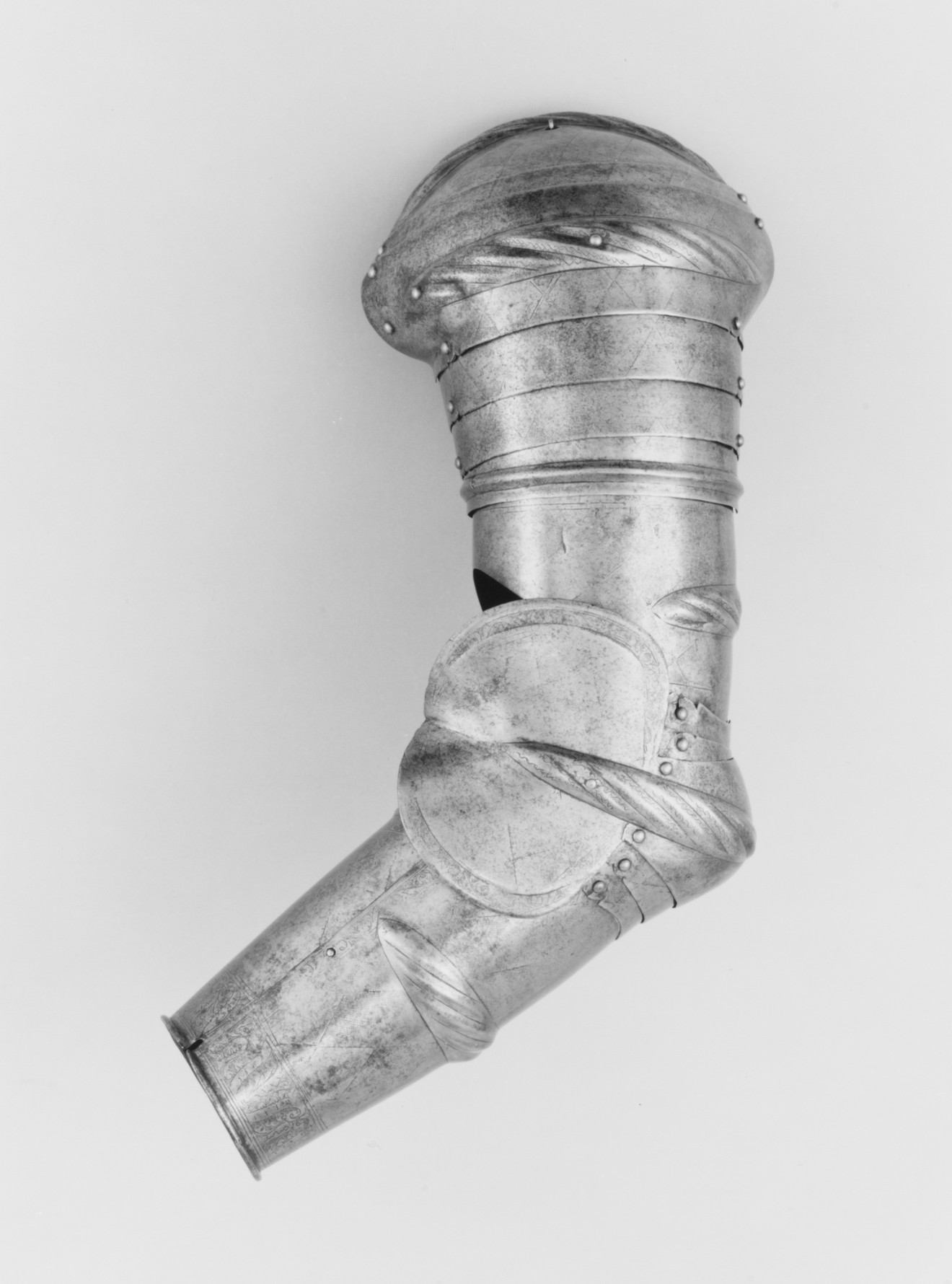
Defense from a left arm, formerly in Eaves's collection and now owned by the Metropolitan Museum of Art

Eaves was interested in arms and armour from a young age, writing his first school project on the subject at the age of ten. In 1978 the Royal Armouries, located in the Tower of London, appointed him Keeper of Armour; he held the position for eighteen years. While there he helped secure the long-term loan of the Barendyne helmet, which Eaves later termed "the greatest piece I have been instrumental in acquiring in my period at the Armouries". (Note: Less pressingly, Eaves was called upon in 1993 for the etymology of the phrase "Throw down the gauntlet", when Prime Minister John Major exhorted Sinn Féin to "pick up that gauntlet marked 'peace'". "Er..." said Eaves, "well... I suppose by straining it to the breaking point you could relate gauntlets to hands and thence to offering the hand of peace, but I must say I've never heard of such a thing.") Also in 1978 Eaves was made honorary editor of the Journal of the Arms & Armour Society, serving in that role until 1983. Eaves has also collected pieces of armour himself; one piece, an Italian defense from a left arm, dating to around 1510–1520, is now in the collection of the Metropolitan Museum of Art.

In 1981 Eaves was awarded the Frances E. Markoe Fellowship in Memory of Stephen A. Caldwell and Frances C. F. Caldwell by the Metropolitan Museum of Art in New York City. The scholarship enabled him to research the museum's collection of European armour, specifically the use and development of the brigandine. Eaves's time at the museum coincided with the ninth triennial congress of the International Association of Museums of Arms and Military History, held across September and October. The congress included a medieval banquet planned and funded by Ronald S. Lauder, and held in the hall housing the museum's arms and armour collection. The New York Times covered the event. "Many of the guests last night cast covetous eyes at the museum's collection, which is among the best in the world", the Times wrote, quoting "a smiling Ian D.D. Eaves, curator of The Armories at Her Majesty's Tower of London" as saying "'There's a number of things I'd like to make off with if I could be sure I would be undetected'". (Note: Eaves's statement was quoted the following year in an article by Slade Richard Gandert in Library & Archival Security, to make the point that "[t]he idea that just about anybody is capable of theft is not farfetched." Also included in his evidence were the words of August Belmont's biographer David Black, who "told what he would do to gain access to letters, if they existed, which would confirm or deny the allegation that Belmont was involved in the Lincoln assassination plot. "I would have done anything to get it, committed the most heinous crime". Citing Gandert, a 2005 master's thesis on book and manuscript went on to claim that "Book thieves can be overenthusiastic hobbyists, drug addicts, gamblers, politicians, priests, librarians, night custodians, building maintenance workers, PhD candidates, library benefactors, or historians. They may steal only once. They may have their method down pat, having long been in the business of living off of stolen goods. They do not have any specific 'look' but are often charming, knowledgeable, and friendly. Ian D. D. Eaves, Curator of the Armory at Her Majesty's Tower in London and a gentleman, said with a pleasant smile while viewing the armor collection of the Metropolitan Museum of Art, 'There's a number of things I'd like to make off with if I could be sure I would be undetected.'" Gandert was later termed "a bit credulous" for making his assertion.) The article went on to note that Eaves would be continuing at the Metropolitan Museum for an additional two months, in order to undertake "a detailed examination" of some of the museum's British items. The following year, in 1982, Eaves became a consultant curator for the Higgins Armory Museum in Worcester, Massachusetts. Among other duties during this time, he lectured on the armours of King Henry VIII of England.

In 1996 Eaves left the Royal Armouries and became a consultant on arms and armour, work he still does as of 2026. The work includes research, along with cataloging and editing, for museums and institutions across Europe and North America. Institutions Eaves has worked for include the Metropolitan Museum of Art, the Art Institute of Chicago, the Fitzwilliam Museum of the University of Cambridge, and the Worshipful Company of Armourers and Brasiers in London. Eaves has also provided consulting services for auction houses. He worked at Sotheby's until 2005, when Thomas Del Mar, the head of the company's arms and armour business, left to form Thomas Del Mar Limited, and took Eaves and Franciska Ekman with him. The new company continued to work on a contractual basis with Sotheby's, "effectively allow[ing] Sotheby's to buy in the expertise for their sales programme as and when they require it," as one trade publication put it, "while allowing the specialists to develop their own businesses and client services."

== Awards ==
In 1983 Eaves was awarded the Research Medal of the Arms & Armour Society, for services to the study of arms and armour. The following year, on 12 January 1984, he was elected a Fellow of the Society of Antiquaries of London. Since 1995, Eaves has served as the honorary president of the Arms & Armour Society.

As part of the 2017 New Year Honours, announced on 31 December 2016, Eaves was appointed a Member of the Royal Victorian Order, "[f]or services to the Royal Collection."

== Publications ==
Eaves has been commissioned to create catalogues for multiple large collections of arms and armour, including the Royal Collection and the Fitzwilliam collection. He has also published a number of scholarly articles and books, and is a coauthor of a volume from a five-volume miniature book series, The Art of the Gun.

=== Royal Collection ===
In 2000, Eaves was approached to continue the work of producing a comprehensive catalogue of armour held in the Royal Collection. The project was intended to fill a gap in scholarship and supersede the somewhat cursory efforts of Guy Laking that had been published in 1904. The Laking work had included only the works he considered to be highlights of the collection, despite his assertion that "each item ... can stand the most severe scrutiny", and at 283 pages it was just over half the length of Eaves's later catalogue.

Efforts at a successor work to Laking's catalogue had begun in the 1980s as part of a wider cataloguing collaboration between Claude Blair, the keeper of metalwork at the Victoria and Albert Museum, who acted as general editor, and two senior figures at the Royal Armouries, A. V. B. Norman (armour, edged weapons) and Howard Blackmore (firearms). Although a draft was prepared in eight years, "an amazing achievement" in the words of Geoffrey de Bellaigue, Surveyor of the Queen's Works of Art from 1972 to 1996, the deaths of Norman in 1998 and Blackmore in 1999 threatened completion of the project. In 2000 Eaves, then Keeper of Armour at the Royal Armouries, was asked to take on the task, both updating and extending Norman's work and also adding completely new entries. Tobias Capwell, a curator at the Wallace Collection, said in his review of the resulting book - Arms & Armour in the Collection of Her Majesty The Queen (2016) - that

The book's complicated history makes the materialisation of this work all the more impressive. Despite being aware of the progress of the project previously, I could never have been prepared for the experience of opening a package to find "new" work by a leading figure in the field who departed this life nearly 20 years ago. Beyond Norman's central authorial role, the detailed introduction by Howard Blackmore comes as a complete surprise, while the extent of Blair's direct involvement could not have been fully anticipated either. New words, from three of the 20th century's great scholars, defying time and the grave.

=== Fitzwilliam collection ===
Eaves's 2002 work Catalogue of European Armour at the Fitzwilliam Museum was the result of a private commission, through a grant by the museum. The work, approaching a collection largely comprising sixteenth-century German and North Italian field armour, categorised the pieces by whole armours, half armours, helmets, parts armour, and horse armour. Described as an "excellent" if rather expensive book with "[e]very rivet, hinge, plate, crack, pitting, internal washer, decoration, internal lining, lames, etc. ... carefully noted to provide an accurate assessment of the piece", it was nonetheless found to contain flaws when reviewed by David M. Oster. Eaves, according to Oster, was himself dissatisfied with some elements of the book's structure, which were imposed upon him by the Fitzwilliam Museum. Oster also noted that Eaves had no hand in the selection of illustrations or writing their associated captions, some of which contain errors.

=== The Art of the Gun ===
In 2003 Eaves coauthored the second volume of a five-volume miniature book series, The Art of the Gun. The heavily illustrated series displayed highlights of the collection of Robert M. Lee, a philanthropist and collector, whose interest in cars led to two best in shows at the Pebble Beach Concours d'Elegance. The books covered guns from the Renaissance through the twenty-first century; the volume coauthored by Eaves, European Firearms Masterpieces from the 17th to the 19th Centuries, displayed highly decorated examples from the era. As described by the publisher, it served as a "celebrat[ion of] the art, craftsmanship, romance and performance of fine firearms, throughout the ages."

=== Papers ===
Eaves has written a number of scholarly articles, many of which were published in the Journal of the Arms & Armour Society; Eaves also translated a work by the German scholar Ortwin Gamber for the journal. Eaves has also written for other journals, including on the tournament armours worn by King Henry VIII of England.

Papers written or translated by Eaves include:

- Gamber, Ortwin (December 1982). "Some Notes on the Sutton Hoo Military Equipment". The Journal of the Arms & Armour Society. X (6). Translated by Eaves, Ian. London: 208–216. ISSN 0004-2439.
- Eaves, Ian (Winter 1984). "Letter to the Editor". Master Drawings. XXII (4). London: 468. JSTOR 1553744.
- Eaves, Ian; Richardson, Thom (September 1987). "The Warwick Shaffron". The Journal of the Arms & Armour Society. XII (4): 217–222.
- Eaves, Ian (1989). "On the Remains of a Jack of Plate Excavated from Beeston Castle in Cheshire". The Journal of the Arms & Armour Society. XIII. London: 137–138. ISSN 0004-2439.
- Eaves, Ian (1993). "The Tournament Armours of King Henry VIII of England". Livrustkammaren. ISSN 0024-5372.
- Eaves, Ian (September 1999). "The Greenwich Armour and Locking Gauntlet of Sir Henry Lee in the Collection of the Worshipful Company of Armourers and Brasiers". The Journal of the Arms & Armour Society. XVI (3). London: 133–136. ISSN 0004-2439.

=== Books ===
- Eaves, Ian (2002). Catalogue of European Armour at the Fitzwilliam Museum. Boydell Press. ISBN 978-0-85115-857-0.
- Norman, A. V. B.; Eaves, Ian (2016). Arms & Armour: in the Collection of Her Majesty The Queen. Royal Collection Trust. ISBN 978-1-90568-648-3.

== Bibliography ==
- "About Robert M. Lee". Robert M. Lee Trust. Archived from the original on 1 March 2019.
- "About Us". Thomas Del Mar Ltd. Archived from the original on 30 July 2018.
- "The Art of the Gun: Miniature Book Volume 2". Yellowstone Press. Archived from the original on 26 January 2025.
- Capwell, Tobias (16 June 2016). "A Monument to the Living and the Dead: On the Queen's Arms and Armour". The Art Newspaper. Archived from the original on 18 June 2016.
- "Defense for the Left Arm". Metropolitan Museum of Art.
- "Evidence Sheds Light on Shipwreck". Florida Today. Brevard County, Florida. 25 August 1996. pp. 7B–8B – via Newspapers.com.
- "Fellows Directory: E". Society of Antiquaries of London.
- "Fellowships and Professional Travel Stipends". Annual Report of the Trustees of the Metropolitan Museum of Art. 112: 59–60. 1982. JSTOR 40304856.
- Gandert, Slade Richard (1982). "Greeks Bearing Gifts and Other Sad Tales". Library & Archival Security. 4 (3): 39–46. doi:10.1300/J114v04n03_03.
- "Higgins-Armory Museum". The Boston Globe. Boston, Massachusetts. 13 October 1983 – via Newspapers.com.
- "Higgins-Armory Museum". The Boston Globe. Boston, Massachusetts. 20 October 1983 – via Newspapers.com.
- "Ian Eaves". Yellowstone Press.
- "Ian EAVES". The Gazette: Official Public Record.
- Katz, Bill (Fall 1983). "Perspective". Collection Building. 5 (3): 39–42. doi:10.1108/eb023119.
- "Legal Joust Looms over Plan to Sell Medieval Helm". The Guardian. London. 25 March 1996. p. 6 – via Newspapers.com.
- Montgomery, Paul L. (3 October 1981). "And with Mailed Fist Raise a Toast". Book Review. The New York Times. Vol. CXXXI, no. 45, 090. New York City. p. 17.
- Nathe, Margarite Annette (April 2005). "A Learned Congress": A Closer Look at Book and Manuscript Thieves (MSLS). University of North Carolina at Chapel Hill.
- "Now Sotheby's Contract Out Arms and Armour". Antiques Trade Gazette. 14 December 2005.
- "Officers". Arms & Armour Society. Archived from the original on 1 February 2020.
- "Pick up the Gauntlet of Peace. Pardon?". The Guardian. London. 23 December 1993. p. 16 – via Newspapers.com.
- Oster, David M. (April 2003). "Review: Catalogue of European Armour at the Fitzwilliam Museum by Ian Eaves". The Journal of Military History. 67 (2). Lexington, VA: Society for Military History: 551–552. doi:10.1353/jmh.2003.0155. JSTOR 3093475.
