= A. V. B. Norman =

British museum curator and scholar

A. V. B. Norman FSA FSA Scot
- Born: Alexander Vesey Bethune Norman; 10 February 1930; Delhi, British India
- Died: 20 July 1998 (aged 68); Edinburgh, Scotland
- Other name: Nick Norman
- Education: University of London
- Occupations: Military historian, museum curator
- Known for: Master of the Armouries (1977–1988), co-founder of the Church Monuments Society

Alexander Vesey Bethune "Nick" Norman FSA FSA Scot (10 February 1930 – 20 July 1998) was a British historian of arms and armour, museum curator and author. He served as assistant director of the Wallace Collection in London, was appointed Master of the Armouries at the Tower of London from 1977 to 1988, and co-founded the Church Monuments Society in 1978 with Claude Blair.

== Early life and education ==
Norman was born in Delhi, where his father, Lieutenant Colonel Alexander Maximilian Bethune Norman, was serving with the Gordon Highlanders. He moved to London, England, at 10 months, and then to his cousin's estate Kildrummy Castle, Aberdeenshire, Scotland, aged 6 years. He was educated at Glenalmond College, then an all-boys independent boarding school. He went on to study agriculture at Peterhouse, Cambridge. He joined the ranks of the Territorial Army, and achieved the rank of lance corporal. He was commissioned as a second lieutenant in the Scottish Horse on 11 July 1954. He left Cambridge after two years following a back injury that he sustained during army training. As such, he also retired "on account of disability" from the Territorial Army on 1 January 1956. A change of direction took him to the University of London, where he completed a general degree as an external student in 1954.

== Career ==
=== Wallace Collection ===
Norman began volunteering at the Wallace Collection under Sir James Mann and was appointed assistant to the director in 1963. A monograph that grew out of Norman's research at the Wallace Collection, The Rapier and Small-Sword, 1460–1820, was later reviewed in The Burlington Magazine.

=== Scottish United Services Museum ===
Between 1957 and 1963 he was assistant curator of the Scottish United Services Museum (now part of National Museums Scotland) and honorary curator of Sir Walter Scott's arms at Abbotsford.

=== Royal Armouries ===
On 1 January 1977 Norman was appointed Master of the Armouries, the first professional arms historian to hold the revived office. In 1985, he began dispersing parts of the Tower collection to other institutions, including the English Civil War armoury at Littlecote House. During his first year as Master the armoury's flagship display catalogue The Medieval Soldier was written, later being described as "scholarly and sophisticated" in comparison to his prior work.

=== Church Monuments Society ===
Interest in monumental effigies as evidence for dating armour led Norman and his friend, the Victoria and Albert Museum curator Claude Blair, to organise a symposium at the Tower of London in September 1978. A vote at the meeting founded the International Society for the Study of Church Monuments (renamed the Church Monuments Society the following year) with Norman as a founding committee member.

== Later years and death ==
Two years before his death he delivered the Society of Antiquaries of Scotland's Rhind Lectures, later printed as The Auld Stane Man, which set out a new framework for classifying Scotland's medieval military effigies. Norman continued to research and curate until his death in Edinburgh on 20 July 1998.

== Legacy ==
In 2007 the A. V. B. Norman Research Trust was established to support work in military history, and in 2019 helped fund a book by Tobias Capwell.

== Selected works ==
- Norman, A. V. B.; Pottinger, Don (1966). A History of War and Weapons, 449 to 1660: English Warfare from the Anglo-Saxons to Cromwell. Thomas Y. Crowell. ISBN 9780690393668.
- Norman, Vesey (1972). Arms and Armour. Octopus Books. ISBN 9780706400342.
- Norman, Alexander Vesey Bethune (1976). Catalogue of Ceramics: Pottery, maiolica, faience, stoneware. London: Trustees of the Wallace Collection. ISBN 9780900785061.
- Norman, A. V. B. (1979). The Rapier and Small-Sword, 1460–1820. Arms & Armour Press. ISBN 9780853682738.
- Norman, A. V. B.; Wilson, G. M. (1982). Treasures from the Tower of London: Arms and Armour. Arms & Armour Press. ISBN 9780853685418.
- Norman, A. V. B.; Pottinger, Don (1985). English Weapons and Warfare, 449–1660. Dorset Press. ISBN 9780880290449.
- Norman, A. V. B. (1994). The Medieval Soldier. Barnes & Noble Inc. ISBN 9781566193818.
- Norman, A. V. B.; Eaves, Ian (2016). Arms & Armour in the Collection of Her Majesty the Queen: European Armour. Royal Collection Trust. ISBN 9781905686483.
