= Fort Nelson, Hampshire =

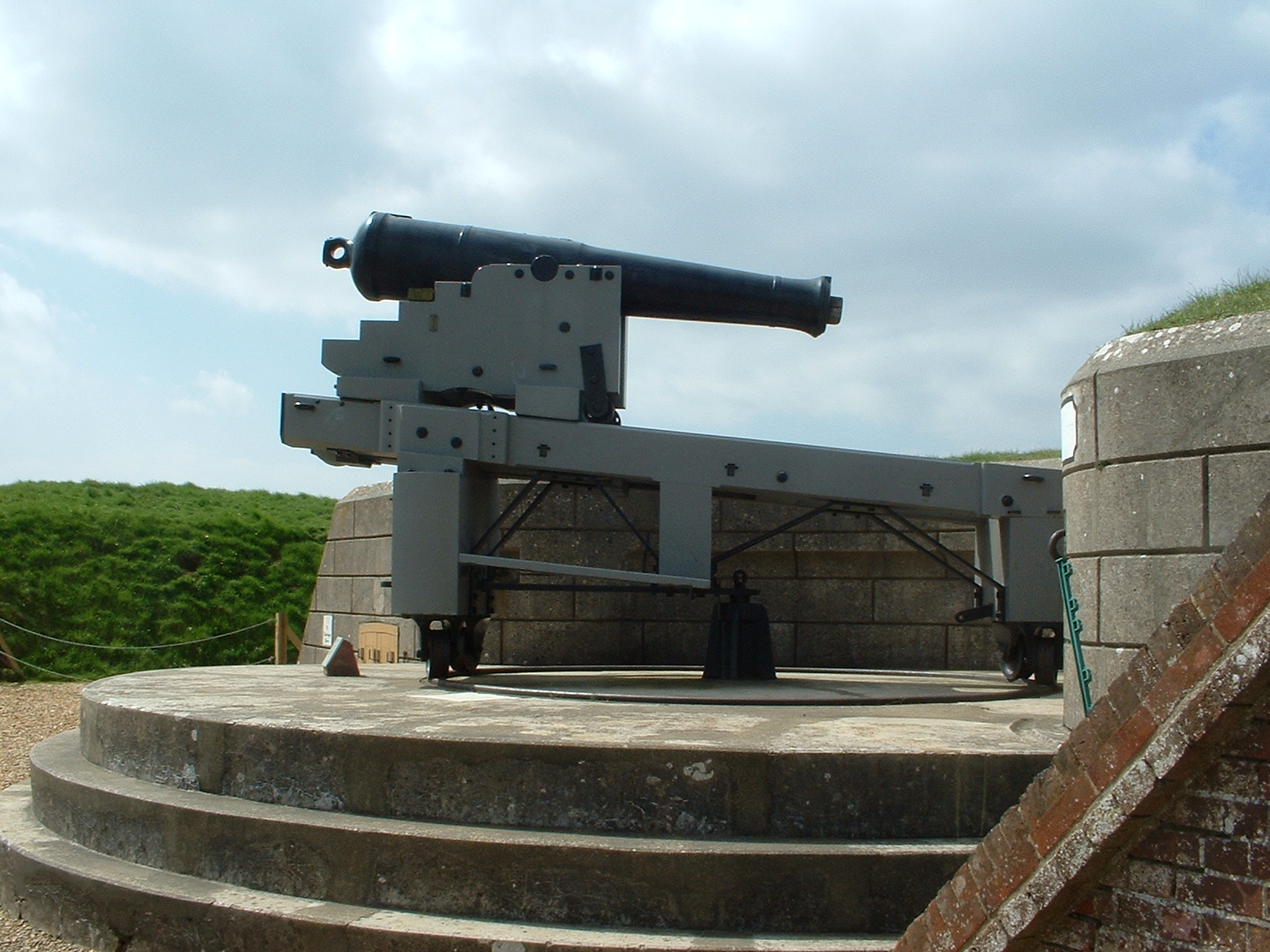
- 64pdr R.M.L. on traversing carriage – part of the original armament of Fort Nelson.

- Location within Hampshire
- 50°51′40″N 1°08′20″W
- Type: Palmerston fort
- Location: Boarhunt
- OS grid reference: SU 60696 07203

History
- Built: 1860–1867

Site notes
- Area: Hampshire
- Owner: Hampshire County Council

Listed Building – Grade I
- Official name: Fort Nelson, Boarhunt
- Designated: 22 Dec 1971
- Reference no.: 1350616

Fort Nelson, in the civil parish of Boarhunt in the English county of Hampshire, is one of five defensive forts built on the summit of Portsdown Hill in the 1860s, overlooking the important naval base of Portsmouth and is a Grade I Listed Building. The current tenant is the Royal Armouries, housing the artillery of the national collection of arms and armour.

== Description ==
Fort Nelson is a typical Polygonal or Palmerston Fort. It is six-sided with a deep ditch protected by three caponiers. Above each caponier is a well-protected emplacement for 13-inch mortars. It was originally entered by two Guthrie rolling bridges and has a barrack block for 172 officers and other ranks, protected by a V-shaped redan. A large open parade ground gives access to the magazines 40 feet underneath it. There are open emplacements on the ramparts for 64 pounder rifled muzzle-loading guns and RML 6.6-inch howitzers. There are also three Haxo casemates for 7 inch rifled breech-loaders.

The Nelson Monument, which gave the fort its name, stands adjacent.

== History ==
Fort Nelson is one of five Portsdown Forts. Built as a result of the 1859 Royal Commission by Lord Palmerston to prevent a French land attack on the Portsmouth dockyard only 8 kilometres away, because the older Hilsea Lines at the bottom of the ridge were considered insufficient. A series of 6 forts were built along the 7 miles (10 km) of the ridge. From west to east they are forts Fareham, Wallington, Nelson, Southwick, Widley and Purbrook. The line was finished off at the eastern end with Crookhorn Redoubt and Farlington Redoubt. A garrison of around 200 volunteers accompanied by regular army officers would have staffed the fort in time of war. Construction was protracted and Fort Nelson was not fully armed until the 1890s. The fort was disarmed in 1907 and then used for accommodation. In 1938, it was converted to an area anti-aircraft ammunition store; ten large magazines were built on the parade ground. Fort Nelson was abandoned in the 1950s.

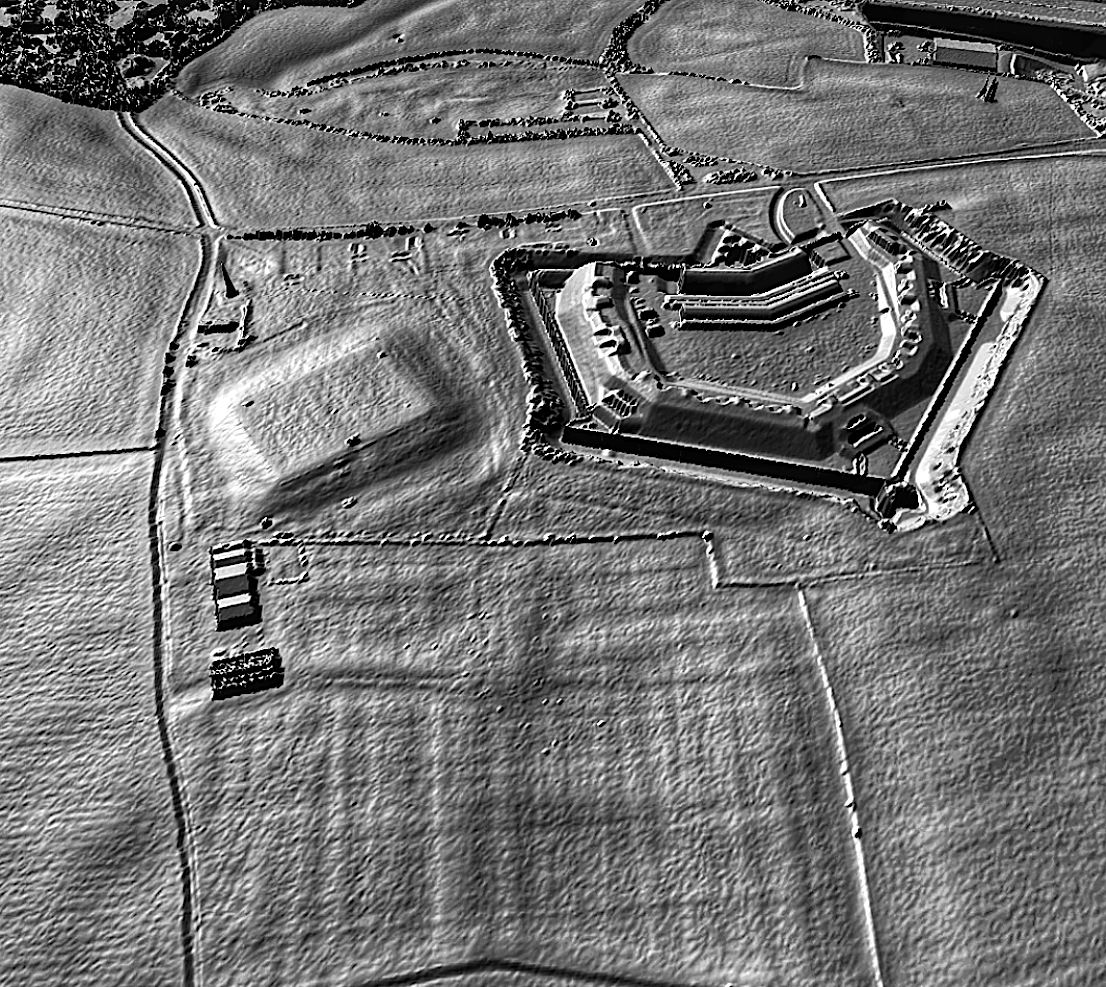
A lidar view of Fort Nelson.

== Royal Armouries ==
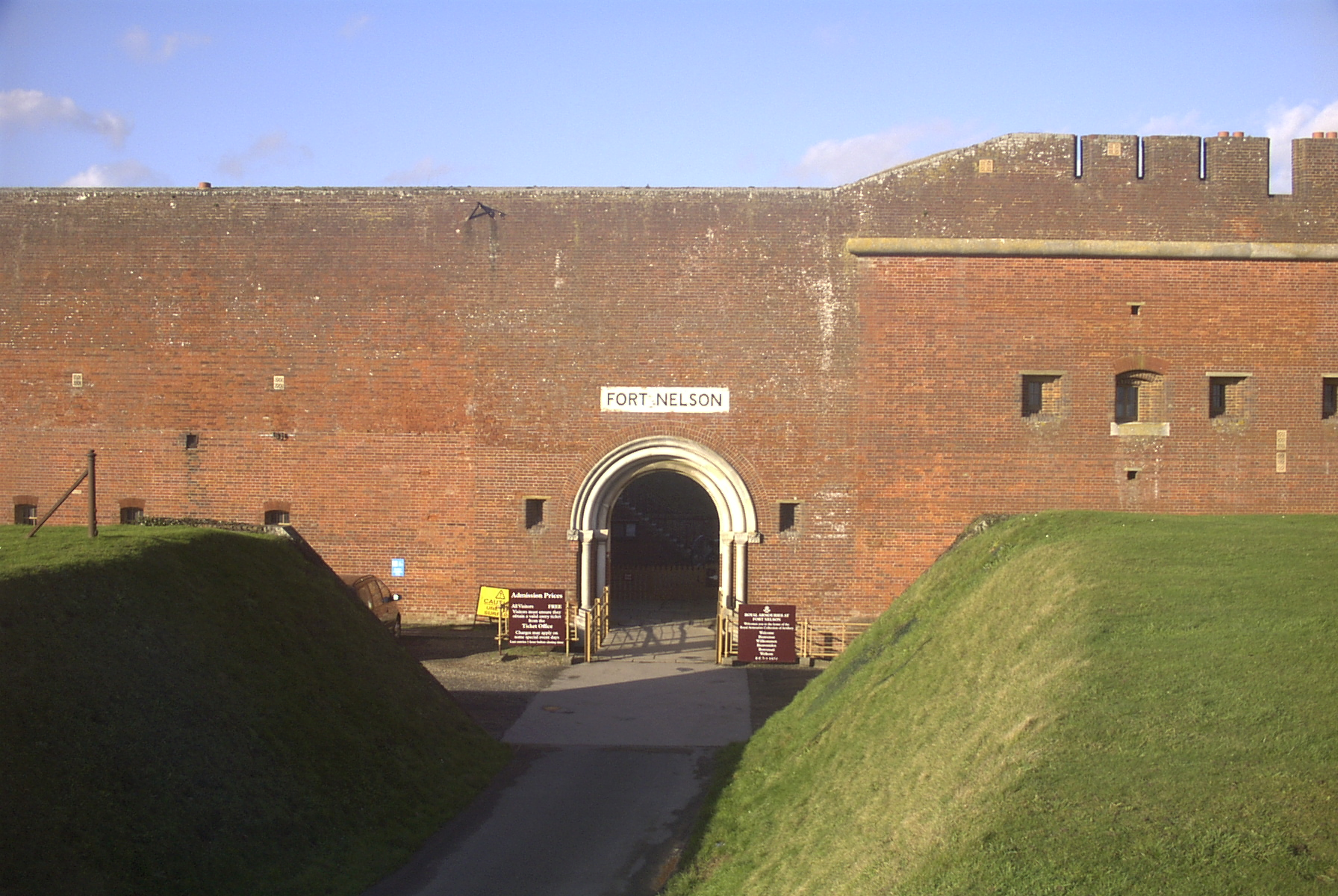
Previous visitor entrance to Fort Nelson

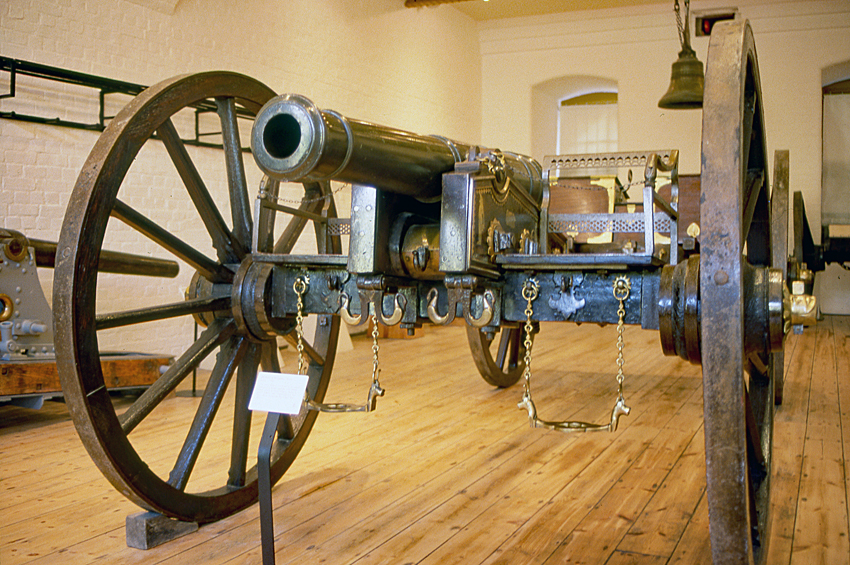
Indian brass 9-pounder gun on field carriage

In 1979, after years of neglect and vandalism, it was sold to Hampshire County Council for £50,000. The Council, with assistance of volunteers from the Palmerston Forts Society, restored it at a cost of £3–4 million, and it opened to the public in 1994, becoming part of the Royal Armouries in 1995. It houses their collection of artillery, including:

- The 'Boxted Bombard', an English wrought iron cannon from around 1450, which was powerful enough to fire a 60 kg granite ball
- The 'Dardanelles Gun', an Ottoman bronze cannon from 1464 which was powerful enough to fire stone balls with a diameter of 63 cm
- French field guns captured at the Battle of Waterloo
- Fortress guns from India and China.
- Parts of the Iraqi 'Project Babylon' Gulf War-era supergun
- One of the two Mallet's Mortars
- Several SBBL 32 pounders

The fort covers around 19 acres (77,000 m^{2}) and is open all year round, with no charges except for some special events. Live firing demonstrations are held every day, costumed guides, video presentations, and visitors are able to explore the tunnels that run below the fort connecting the magazines with gun emplacements. There are displays demonstrating the living and working conditions of the soldiers who defended the fort, and views over Portsmouth, the Solent, Hayling Island and Gosport, with the Isle of Wight beyond.

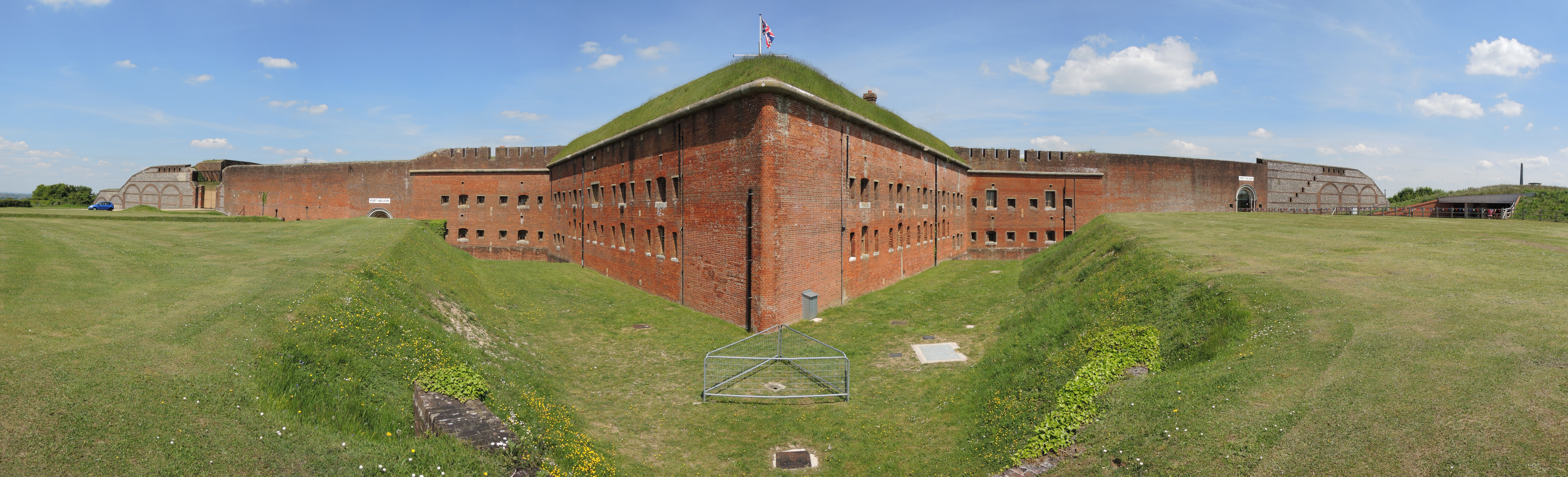
Part of the defences of Fort Nelson

== Sources ==
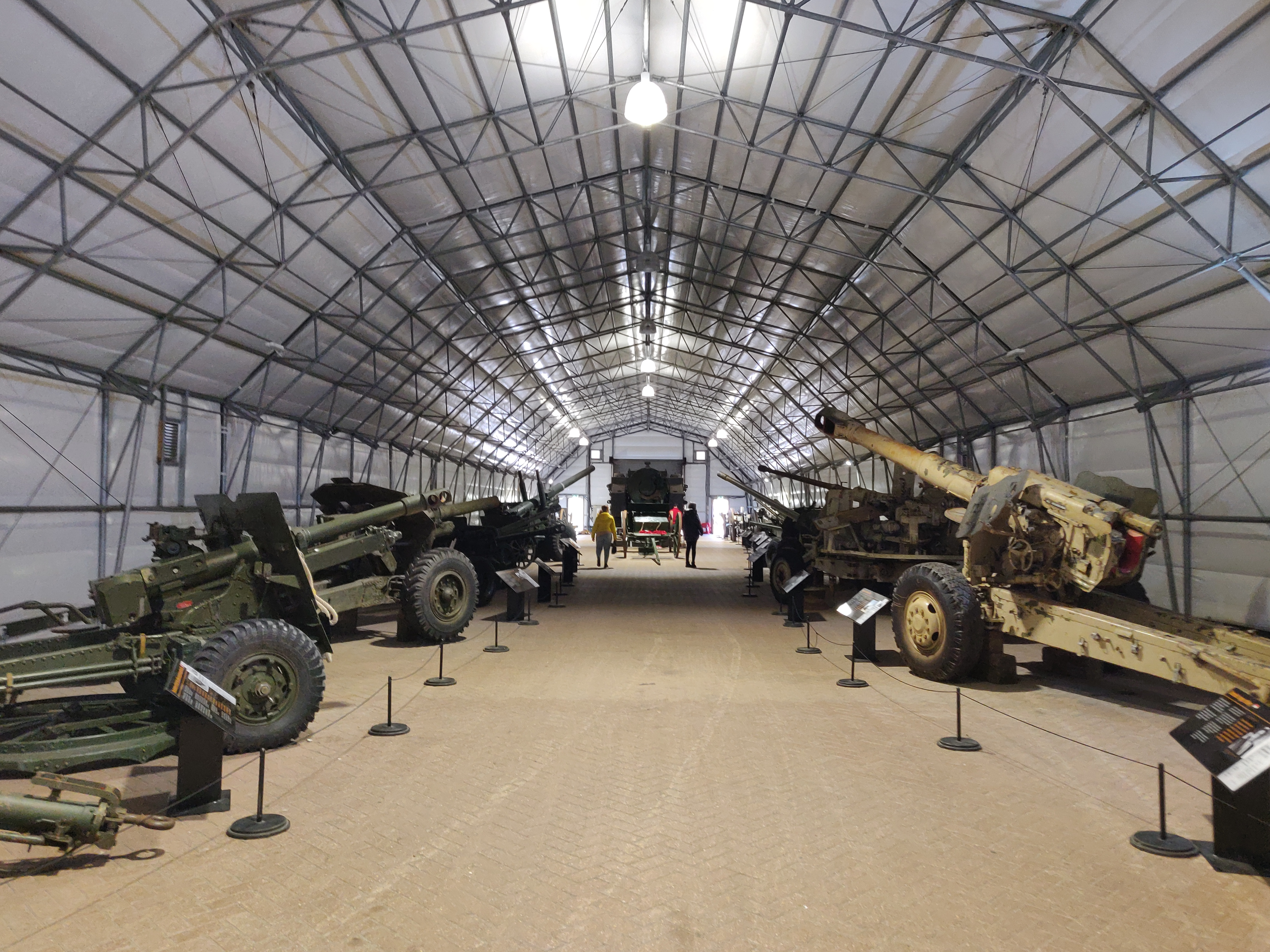
Artillery Hall, Royal Armouries, Fort Nelson

- The Royal Armouries at Fort Nelson – Official Site. Page retrieved at 01:53am 5 May 2008.
- Portsmouth Naval and Defence Heritage. Page retrieved at 11.30am 29 July 2005.
- Fareham Borough Council page on Fort Nelson. Page retrieved at 12.20pm 29 July 2005.
