= Boxted =

Boxted could refer to

- Boxted, Essex, a village and civil parish in the Colchester district of Essex, England
- Boxted, Suffolk, a village and civil parish in the Babergh district of Suffolk, England
- RAF Boxted, a former World War II airfield in England
