= Boxted Bombard =

Bombard 15th-century cannon

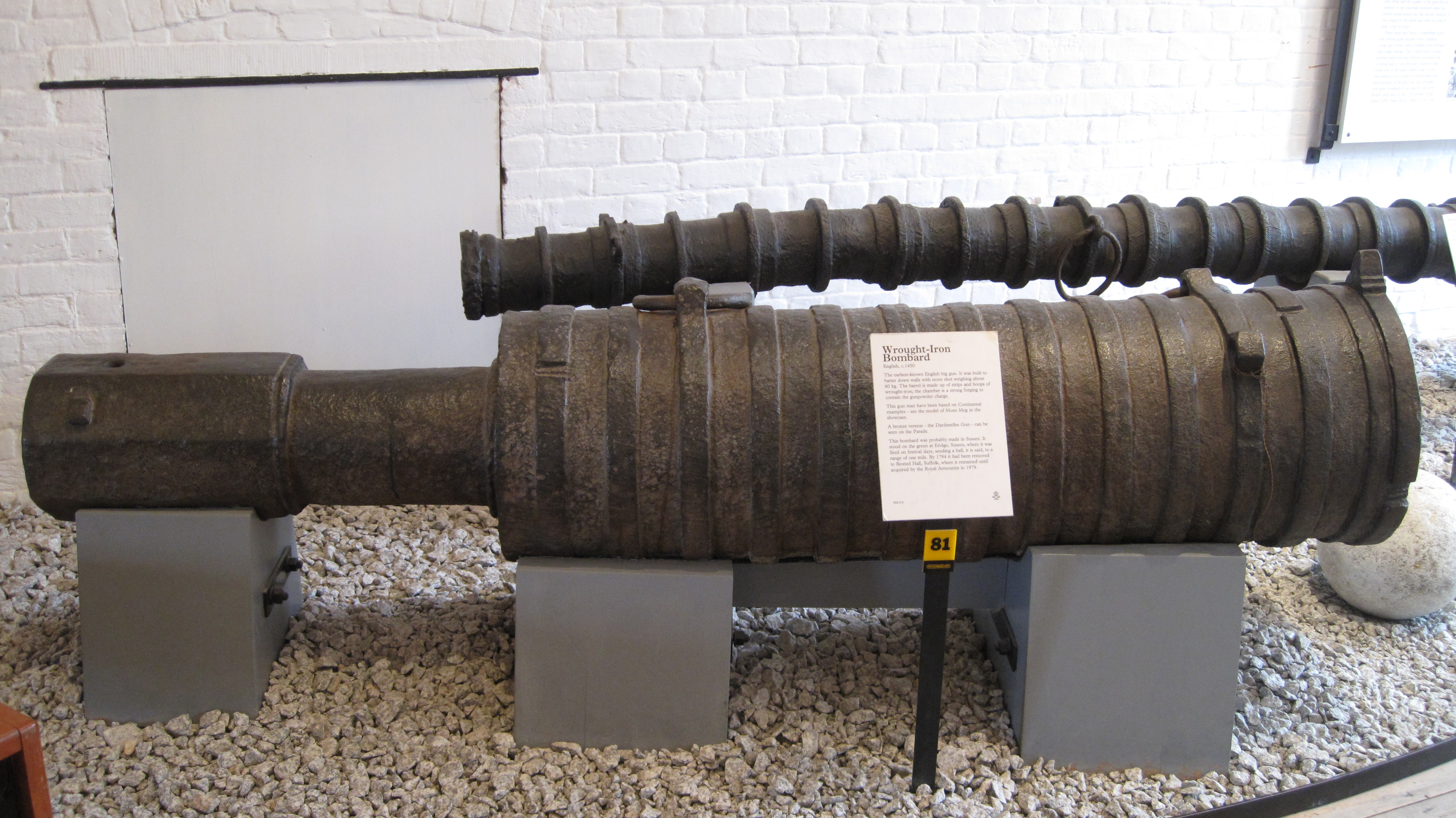
- Boxted Bombard (front)
- Type: Bombard
- Place of origin: England

Service history
- Wars: Unknown

Production history
- Designed: 15th century

Specifications
- Length: 239 cm
- Calibre: 34.3 cm

The Boxted Bombard is a 15th-century cannon from England. The bombard is medium in size for its type, its military use is unknown due to a lack of historical records. For a long time unlocated, the piece was rediscovered for the public at the village of Boxted in the 1970s and is now on display at the artillery collection at Fort Nelson.

== Construction ==
The construction is typical for wrought-iron bombards of the time. The barrel is built of longitudinal iron staves that are bound together with circular hoops comparable to a cask. Bars and hoops were then welded into a hollow cylinder with an inner diameter of 34.3 cm. Some of the reinforcing rings are not completely closed, owing either to a manufacturing error or material fatigue under the strain of firing. The solid power-chamber is welded to the barrel by means of protruding bars and has a much smaller bore of 10.2 cm. The bombard was loaded at the muzzle with stone balls cut to size. Metal rings were fixed on the upper side for transport. The entire cannon has a length of 2.39 m, its weight has not been specified. Overall, it can considered to be of medium calibre compared to the largest pieces of siege artillery of its day.

== History ==
An engraving of the bombard was published by the Society of Antiquaries of London in its 1792 issue of Archaeologia. The short accompanying text explains that it has been fired at Eridge Green, Sussex, "for many years for the amusement of the people on a holiday or fair day" in exchange for money. The alleged target was a hill about a mile away. According to the antiquarian Francis Grose, however, it had already been moved by 1784 from this place to Boxted Hall, a mansion in Boxted, Suffolk. There it apparently remained in possession of a local family, untraceable to Charles ffoulkes and other 20th-century historians, until it was finally located and transferred by the Royal Armouries to the London Tower in 1979. It is today displayed at the branch depot at Fort Nelson.

Due to a lack of known contemporary records, the history of the Boxted bombard can only be roughly reconstructed. The manufacture of wrought-iron cannon in south-eastern England can be traced back to the mid-14th century. Since Eridge lies in the traditional iron-working area of the Weald, it is surmised that the bombard is of local provenance. Its size and construction technique point to the middle of the 15th century, when the production of this type of siege ordnance reached its apogee in Europe.

== Footnotes ==
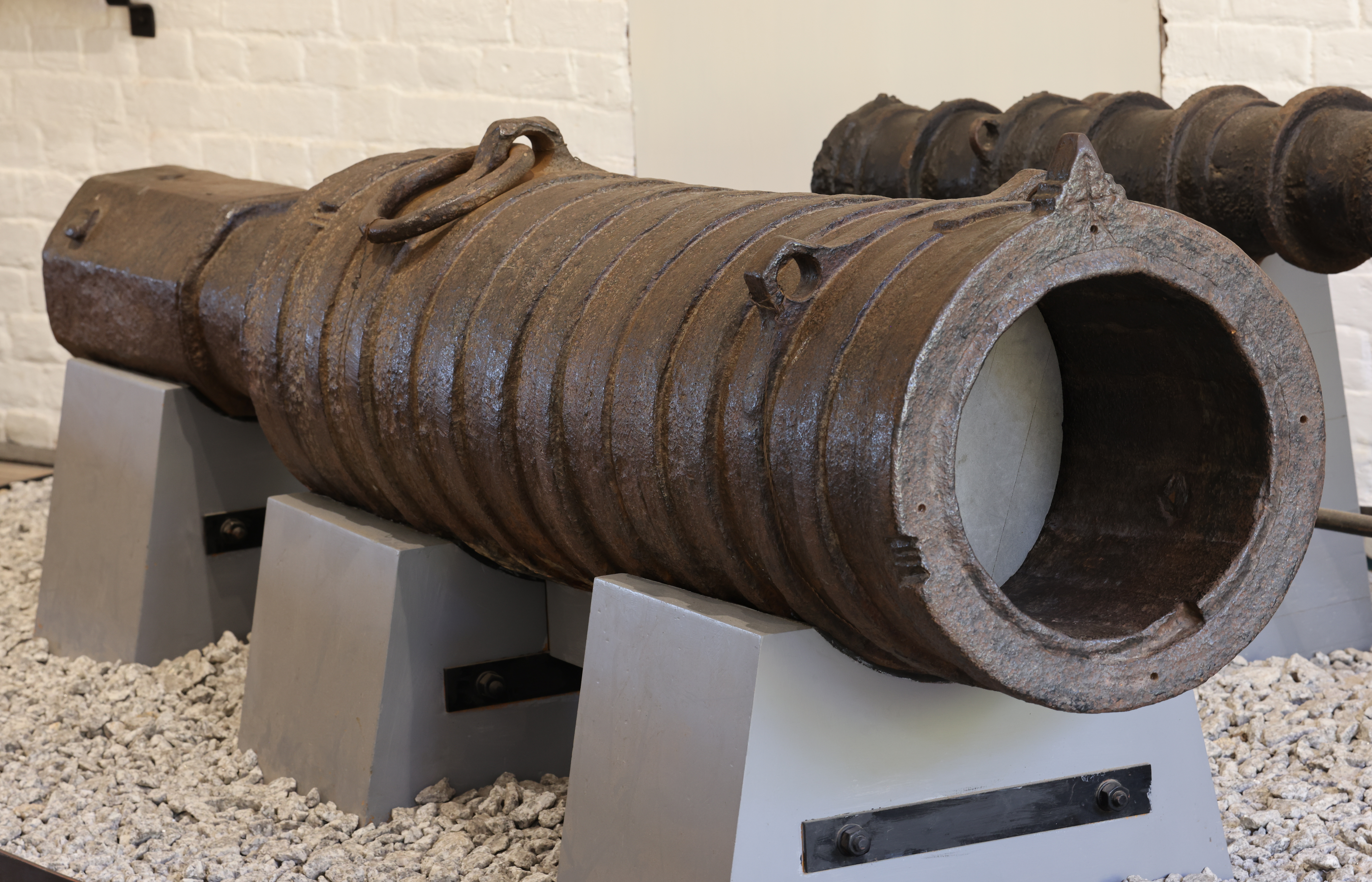
View of the muzzle
