= Guy Wilson (historian) =

British military historian, curator and museum director

Guy Wilson FSA
- Born: Guy Murray Wilson; 18 February 1950 (age 76)
- Known for: Head of the Royal Armouries (1988 to 2002)
- Title: Master of the Armouries
- Spouse: Pamela Ruth McCredie (m. 1972)
- Children: Four

Academic background
- Education: New College, Oxford; University of Manchester

Academic work
- Discipline: Military history

Guy Murray Wilson, FSA (born 18 February 1950) is a British military historian, curator, and museum director. From 1988 to 2002, he was Master of the Armouries and head of the Royal Armouries, the United Kingdom's national museum for arms and armour.

== Early life and education ==
Wilson was born on 18 February 1950 to Rowland Wilson and Mollie Wilson (née Munson). He studied at New College, Oxford, graduating with a Bachelor of Arts (BA) degree; as per tradition, his BA was later promoted to a Master of Arts. He then studied at the University of Manchester where he completed a Diploma in Art Gallery and Museum Studies.

== Career ==
Wilson began working at the Royal Armouries in 1972. From 1978 to 1981, he was keeper of edged weapons and was based in the Tower of London. In 1981, he was appointed Deputy Master of the Armouries. In 1988, he was appointed Master of the Armouries and therefore became the head of the Royal Armouries. During his leadership, the Royal Armouries expanded from its original site at the Tower of London to include two more museums. Fort Nelson, a 19th-century fort and museum near Portsmouth specialising in artillery was taken over by the Royal Armouries in 1995. A new museum was built in Leeds, the Royal Armouries Museum, and it opened in March 1996. He stepped down as Master in 2002.

Outside of his work at the Royal Armouries, he held a number of appointments. Since 1978, he has been a member of the British Commission for Military History. From 1981 to 1999, he served on the Advisory Committee on Historic Wreck. He has been Vice-President of the Arms and Armour Society of Great Britain since 1995. From 2002 to 2003, he served as President of the International Association of Museums of Arms and Military History (IAMAM). From 2003 to 2010, he served as Chairman of the International Committee for Museums of Arms and Military History (ICOMAM). ICOMAM is the successor organisation to IAMAM.

== Personal life ==
In 1972, Wilson married Pamela Ruth McCredie. Together they have four children; two daughters and two sons.

== Honours ==
On 12 January 1984, Wilson was elected a Fellow of the Society of Antiquaries of London (FSA). He was elected a Liveryman of the Worshipful Company of Gunmakers in 1990 and a Liveryman of the Worshipful Company of Armourers and Brasiers in 2000.

== Selected works ==
- Wilson, G M (1975). Crossbows: Treasures of the Tower. London: Her Majesty's Stationery Office. ISBN 978-0116704450.
- Norman, A. V. B.; Wilson, G M (1982). Treasures from the Tower of London : arms and armour. London: Arms and Armour Press. ISBN 978-0853685418.
- Walker, Derek; Wilson, Guy (1996). The Royal Armouries in Leeds: the making of a museum. Leeds: Royal Armouries Museum. ISBN 978-0948092268.
- Wilson, Guy M. (2009). The Vauxhall Operatory. Leeds: Basiliscoe Press. ISBN 978-0955162220.
