= John Blair (historian) =

British historian, archaeologist, and academic

John Blair FSA FBA
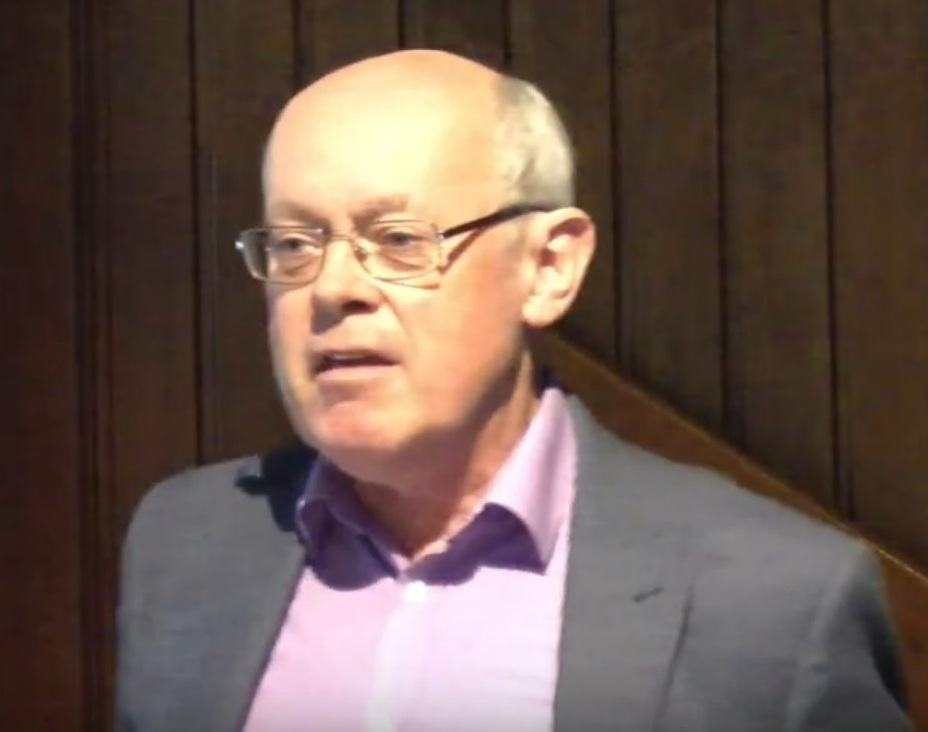
- Blair in 2021
- Born: William John Blair; 4 March 1955 (age 71); Woking, Surrey, England
- Title: Professor of Medieval History and Archaeology
- Spouse: Kanerva Blair-Heikkinen (m. 2005)
- Parent: Claude Blair

Academic background
- Education: Brasenose College, Oxford
- Thesis: Landholding, Church and Settlement in Surrey before 1300 (1983)
- Doctoral advisor: Barbara Harvey

Academic work
- Discipline: History; archaeology
- Sub-discipline: Early medieval English history
- Institutions: The Queen's College, Oxford

William John Blair (born 4 March 1955) is an English historian, archaeologist, and academic, who specialises in Anglo-Saxon England. He is Emeritus Professor of Medieval History and Archaeology at the University of Oxford, and a fellow of The Queen's College, Oxford. He gave the 2013 Ford Lectures at the University of Oxford.

== Early life and education ==
Blair was born on 4 March 1955 in Woking, Surrey, England. His father was Claude Blair, a museum curator and "one of the foremost authorities on historic European metalwork, especially arms and armour", and his mother was Joan Mary Greville Blair (née Drinkwater).

Blair was educated at St John's School, Leatherhead, a private school in Leatherhead, Surrey. He then studied at Brasenose College, Oxford, graduating with a first-class Bachelor of Arts (BA) degree in 1976. He remained at Brasenose College to undertake postgraduate research and completed his Doctor of Philosophy (DPhil) degree in 1983. His doctoral thesis was titled Landholding, Church and Settlement in Surrey before 1300: this subsequently became the basis of his first book, Early Medieval Surrey (1991).

== Academic career ==
During his doctoral research, Blair was a Junior Research Fellow at Brasenose College, Oxford. In 1981, he was elected a Fellow of The Queen's College, Oxford. Since then, he has been a praelector and tutor in history at the college. On 1 October 2006, he was awarded a Title of Distinction by the University of Oxford as Professor of Medieval History and Archaeology. He retired in October 2020 and was made an emeritus fellow of The Queen's College.

Blair gave the 2013 Ford Lectures at the University of Oxford. The lecture series was titled "Building the Anglo-Saxon Landscape".

On 5 May 1983, Blair was elected Fellow of the Society of Antiquaries of London (FSA). He was elected Fellow of the British Academy (FBA) in 2008.

== Personal life ==
In 2005, Blair married Kanerva Heikkinen. Together they have two children; one daughter and one son.

== Selected works ==
- Blair, John (1991). Early Medieval Surrey: Landholding, Church and Settlement before 1300. Gloucester: Alan Sutton Publishing. ISBN 978-0-86299-780-9.
- Blair, John (1994). Anglo-Saxon Oxfordshire. Oxford, Stroud and Dover, NH: Oxfordshire Books and Alan Sutton Publishing. ISBN 978-0-7509-0147-5.
- Blair, John (2000). The Anglo-Saxon Age: a very short introduction. Oxford: Oxford University Press. ISBN 978-0-19-285403-2.
- Blair, John (2005). The Church in Anglo-Saxon Society. Oxford: Oxford University Press. ISBN 978-0-19-822695-6.
- Blair, John, ed. (2007). Waterways and Canal-building in Medieval England. Oxford: Oxford University Press. ISBN 978-0-19-921715-1.
- Blair, John (2013). The British Culture of Anglo-Saxon Settlement. Cambridge: Department of Anglo-Saxon, Norse & Celtic. ISBN 978-0-9571862-9-3.
- Lapidge, Michael; Blair, John; Keynes, Simon; Scragg, Donald, eds. (2014). The Wiley-Blackwell Encyclopedia of Anglo-Saxon England (2nd ed.). Chichester: Wiley-Blackwell. ISBN 978-0-470-65632-7.
- Blair, John (2018). Building Anglo-Saxon England. Princeton: Princeton University Press. ISBN 9780691162980.
- Blair, John; Rippon, Stephen; Smart, Christopher (2020). Planning in the Early Medieval Landscape. Liverpool, UK: Liverpool University Press. ISBN 978-1-78962-116-7.
- Blair, John (2025). Killing the Dead: Vampire Epidemics from Mesopotamia to the New World. Princeton, NJ: Princeton University Press. ISBN 978-0691224794.
