= Claude Blair =

British museum curator and scholar

Claude Blair CVO OBE FSA
- Born: 30 November 1922; Chorlton-cum-Hardy, Lancashire, England
- Died: 21 February 2010 (aged 87); Epsom, Surrey, England
- Education: William Hulme's Grammar School
- Alma mater: University of Manchester
- Occupations: Museum curator and scholar
- Notable work: European Armour, circa 1066 to circa 1700
- Spouse: Joan (m. 1952; died 1996)
- Children: John Blair

Claude Blair, CVO, OBE, FSA (30 November 1922 – 21 February 2010) was a British museum curator and scholar, who specialised in European arms and armour. He is particularly known for his book European Armour: circa 1066 to circa 1700 (1958). He worked in the Royal Armouries at the Tower of London from 1951 to 1956, before moving to the Department of Metalwork at the Victoria and Albert Museum, where he remained until his retirement as Keeper of Metalwork in 1982. He was active in church conservation, and served as a Vice-President of the Society of Antiquaries of London from 1990 to 1993.

== Early life and education ==
Blair was born on 30 November 1922 in Chorlton-cum-Hardy, Lancashire, England. He was the only child born to William Henry Murray Blair (1875–1945), cotton-goods merchant, and Lilian Blair (née Wearing; 1891–1983). He was educated at William Hulme's Grammar School, a grammar school in Manchester.

Following military service in World War II, Blair matriculated into the University of Manchester in 1946. He studied history, and graduated with a Bachelor of Arts (BA) degree in 1950. He later studied for a Master of Arts (MA) degree from Manchester which he completed in 1963 with a thesis titled "The Emperor Maximilian I's Gift of Armour to Henry VIII and the Silvered and Engraved Armour at the Tower of London".

== Career ==
=== Military service ===
Blair served in the British Army during World War II. Having undertaken officer training in 1942, he was commissioned into the Royal Regiment of Artillery as a second lieutenant on 24 April 1943. While serving in Northern Ireland, he was injured in a vehicle accident. He was riding in the back of a truck that was picking up his regiment's beer supply when the truck braked sharply. The beer barrels shifted; his leg was trapped between two of them and was broken. This ended his active service but he remained in the army as part of the team that tested new small arms. He left the Army in 1946 with the rank of captain.

=== Curatorial career ===
In 1951, Blair began his curatorial career, having been appointed an assistant to James Mann at the Tower of London Armouries in London. During his time at the Tower, he undertook research into its armour collection and published a book on the matter, European Armour, circa 1066 to circa 1700, which appeared in 1958. This book proved popular and has "yet to be superseded as the standard text on the subject".

In 1956, Blair moved to the Victoria and Albert Museum (V&A) after being appointed Assistant Keeper of Metalwork by its director, Sir Trenchard Cox. He was promoted to Deputy Keeper in 1966 and to Keeper (i.e. head) of the Department of Metalwork in 1972. He retired from the V&A in 1982.

During his career, Blair published more than 200 books and articles. These were varied works, from those related to his main interest of armour, articles about monuments and even the Crown Jewels. He believed that "museums should be powerhouses of scholarship, but should also communicate and educate". As such, he would give lectures that were accessible to children during the Easter holidays, and wrote a number books aimed at the general public.

== Later life ==
Blair led an active retirement. He was a member of the Churches Conservation Trust from 1982 to 1997, and a member of the Executive Committee of the Council for the Care of Churches from 1983 to 1991. He was Vice-President of the Society of Antiquaries of London between 1990 and 1993.

Blair spent his final years living in Ashtead, Surrey. He died on 21 February 2010 at Epsom Hospital, Epsom, having suffered from heart failure.

== Personal life ==
On 23 February 1952, Blair married Joan Mary Greville Drinkwater (1923–1996). Together they had one son, John Blair (born 1955), who became an academic at Oxford University specialising in the history and archaeology of Anglo-Saxon England.

== Honours ==
In the 1994 Queen's Birthday Honours, Blair was appointed an Officer of the Order of the British Empire (OBE) "for services to Church Conservation". In the 2005 New Year Honours, he was appointed a Commander of the Royal Victorian Order (CVO) "for services to the Royal Collection".

In 1956, he was elected a Fellow of the Society of Antiquaries of London (FSA). In 1986, he was awarded the Medal of the Arms and Armour Society. In 1995, he was awarded the Gold Medal of the Society of Antiquaries; this is awarded "for distinguished services to archaeology" and is the Society's highest award.

== Selected works ==
- Blair, Claude (1958). European Armour: circa 1066 to circa 1700 (1st ed.).
- Blair, Claude (1962). European and American Arms: c. 1100–1850. London: B. T. Batsford.
- Blair, Claude (1968). Pistols of the World. London: Batsford. ISBN 978-0713407136.
- Blair, Claude (1972). European Armour: circa 1066 to circa 1700 (2nd ed.). London: Batsford. ISBN 978-0713407297.
- Blair, Claude (1974). The James A. de Rothschild Collection: Arms, Armour and Miscellaneous Metalwork. Fribourg: Office du Livre. ISBN 978-0707800080.
- Blair, Claude, ed. (1983). Pollard's History of Firearms. New York: Macmillan. ISBN 978-0025976306.
- Blair, Claude, ed. (1998). The Crown Jewels: the history of the coronation regalia in the jewel house of the Tower of London. London: Stationery Office. ISBN 978-0117013599.
