= RML 6.6-inch howitzer =

RML 6.6 inch howitzer
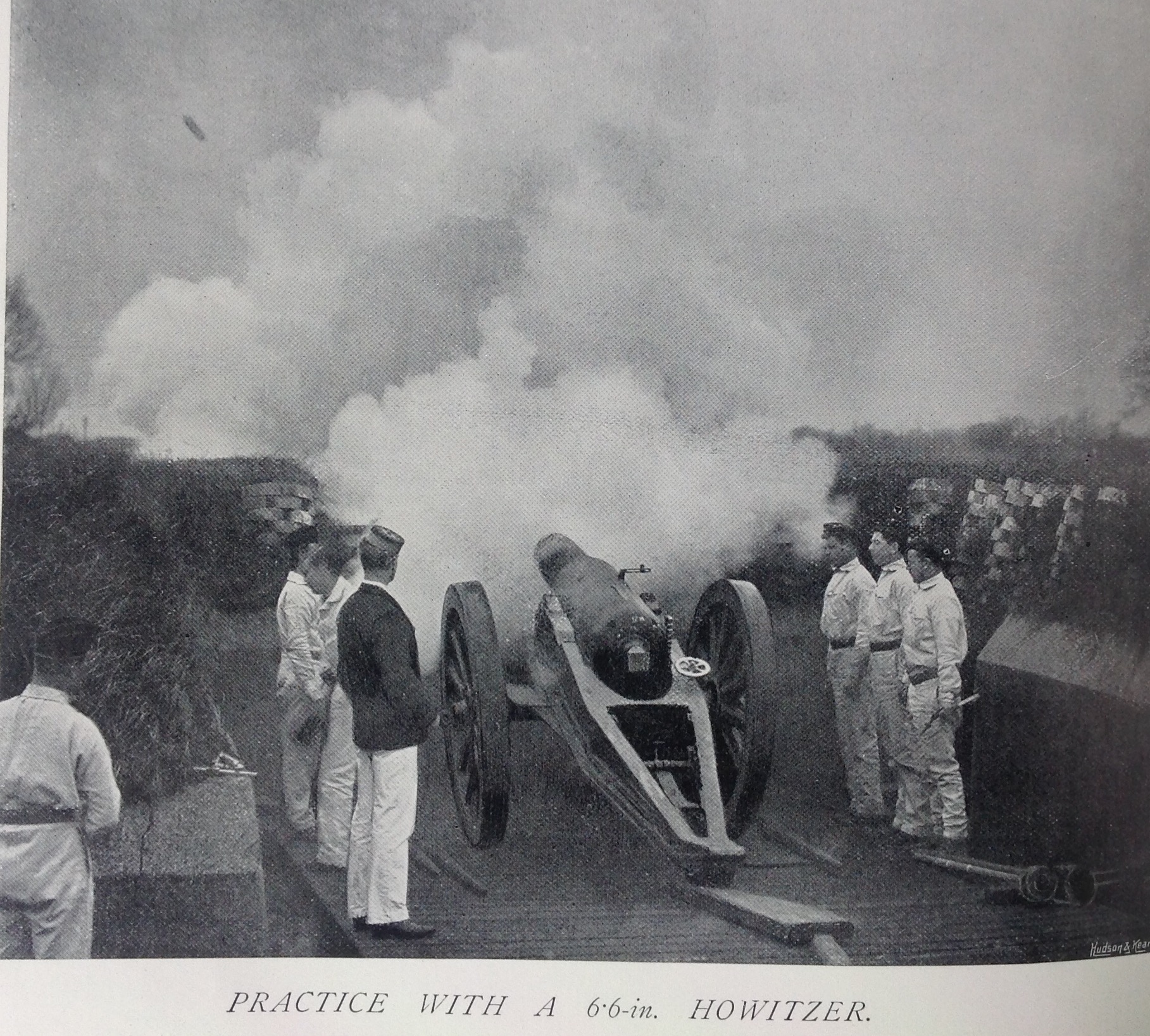
- 6.6 inch RML howitzer being fired at practice, Shoeburyness, 1897
- Type: Howitzer
- Place of origin: United Kingdom

Service history
- In service: 1880 - 1902
- Used by: British Empire

Production history
- Designer: Woolwich Arsenal
- Designed: 1877
- Manufacturer: Woolwich Arsenal
- Variants: Mark I and Mark II

Specifications
- Mass: 36-long-hundredweight (1,800 kg)
- Length: 90.7 inches
- Crew: 9
- Shell: 100 pounds (45 kg) (common shell); 100 pounds (45 kg) (shrapnel)
- Calibre: 6.6 inches (167.6 mm)
- Action: RML
- Breech: none – muzzle-loading
- Muzzle velocity: 839 feet per second (256 m/s)
- Maximum firing range: 5,400 yards (4,900 m)

The RML 6.6 inch howitzer was a British Rifled, Muzzle Loading (RML) Howitzer manufactured in England in the 19th century, which fired a projectile weighing approximately 100 pounds (45 kg). It was used in siege batteries and in fortifications.

== Design and manufacture ==
The Mark I gun consisted of an 'A' tube of toughened steel, over which was shrunk a 'B' tube of wrought iron and jacket. A cascable was fitted at the end. The Mark II gun was of steel throughout. A vertical hardened copper vent was fitted horizontally at the breech end of the Howitzer.

The howitzer was rifled on the "Polygroove" pattern with 20 grooves and projectiles had "Automatic gas-checks" attached to the base which engaged the grooves.

A horizontal plane was machined on the upper surface of the Howitzer, for use with a clinometer, enabling it to be elevated up to 35 degrees. This enabled the gun to be sighted for indirect, or direct fire.

== Ammunition ==
Guns were fired using a silk bag containing a black powder propellant. They used three types of ammunition – Common shell (for use against buildings or fortifications), shrapnel shell (for use any Infantry or Cavalry) and case shot (for close range use against 'soft' targets). Ignition was through a copper lined vent at the breech end of the gun. A copper friction tube would be inserted and a lanyard attached. When the lanyard was pulled the tube would ignite, firing the gun. A number of different fuzes could be used enabling shells to either burst at a pre-determined time (and range), or on impact. A typical rate of fire was one round per minute.

== Service history ==
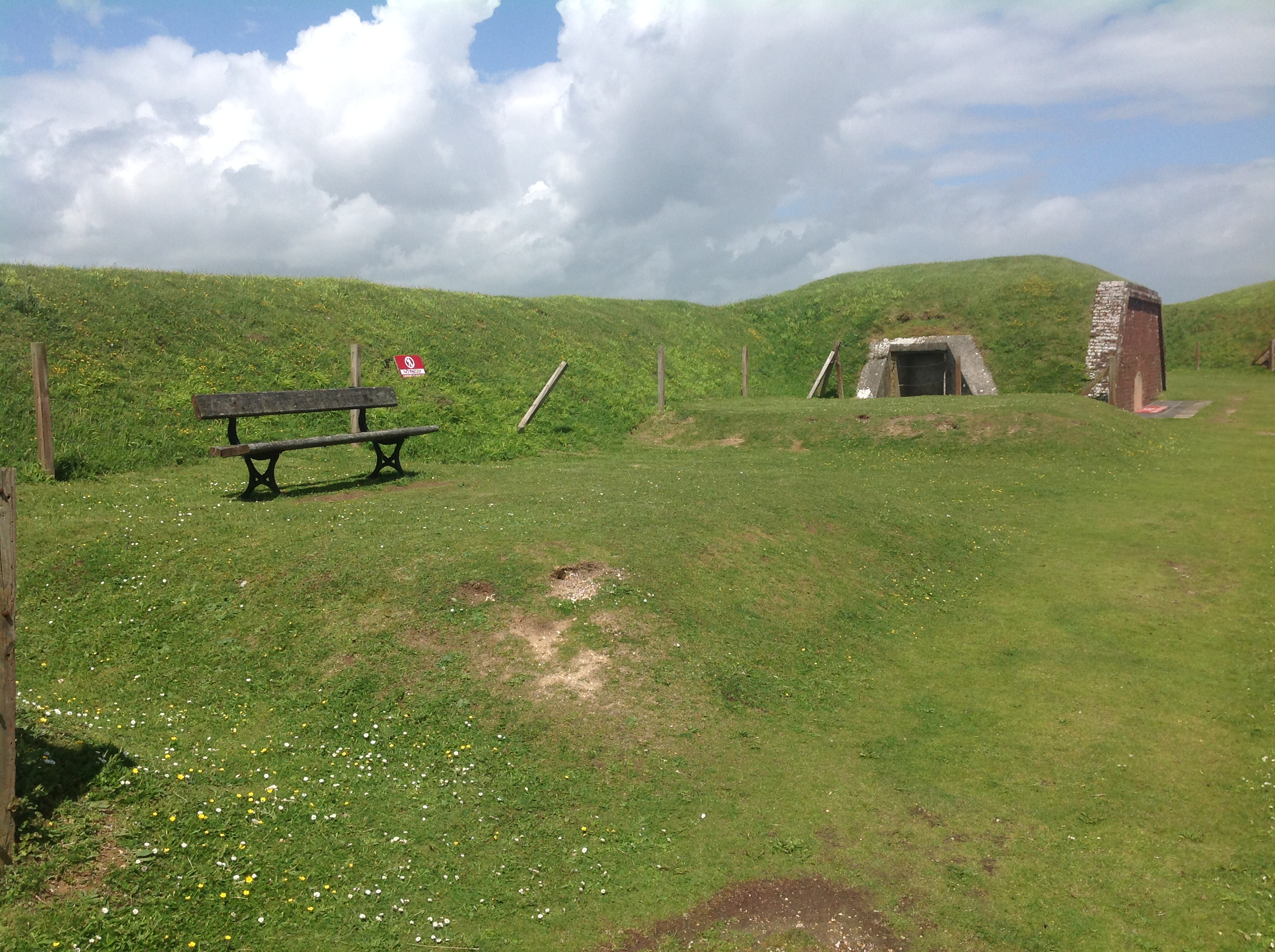
Earth platforms for 6.6-inch RML Howitzers, Fort Nelson

Rifled Muzzle Loading howitzers were selected by the Royal Artillery in the 1870s to replace obsolete smooth bore Mortars and howitzers, as they had great range and accuracy.

The 6.6-inch Howitzer was used a semi-mobile siege artillery, so could be mounted on a travelling siege carriage with limber. In addition a limbered ammunition trailer was also deployed with each gun. Alternatively the howitzer could be mounted on fixed bed and ground platform. Numbers of howitzers were mounted in fixed defences, including Fort Widley and Fort Nelson, Portsmouth which in 1898 show a number mounted.

By 1902 the Howitzer was declared obsolete and removed from service.

== See also ==
- List of howitzers

== Bibliography ==
- Captain John F Owen R.A., "Treatise on the Construction and Manufacture of Ordnance in the British Service", Prepared in the Royal Gun Factory, London, 1877, pages 177–178, 292.
- Text Book of Gunnery, 1902. LONDON : PRINTED FOR HIS MAJESTY'S STATIONERY OFFICE, BY HARRISON AND SONS, ST. MARTIN'S LANE
