= Fort Widley =

Fort in Portsmouth, UK

- Portsdown Hill Road, Cosham, Portsmouth, Hampshire, England
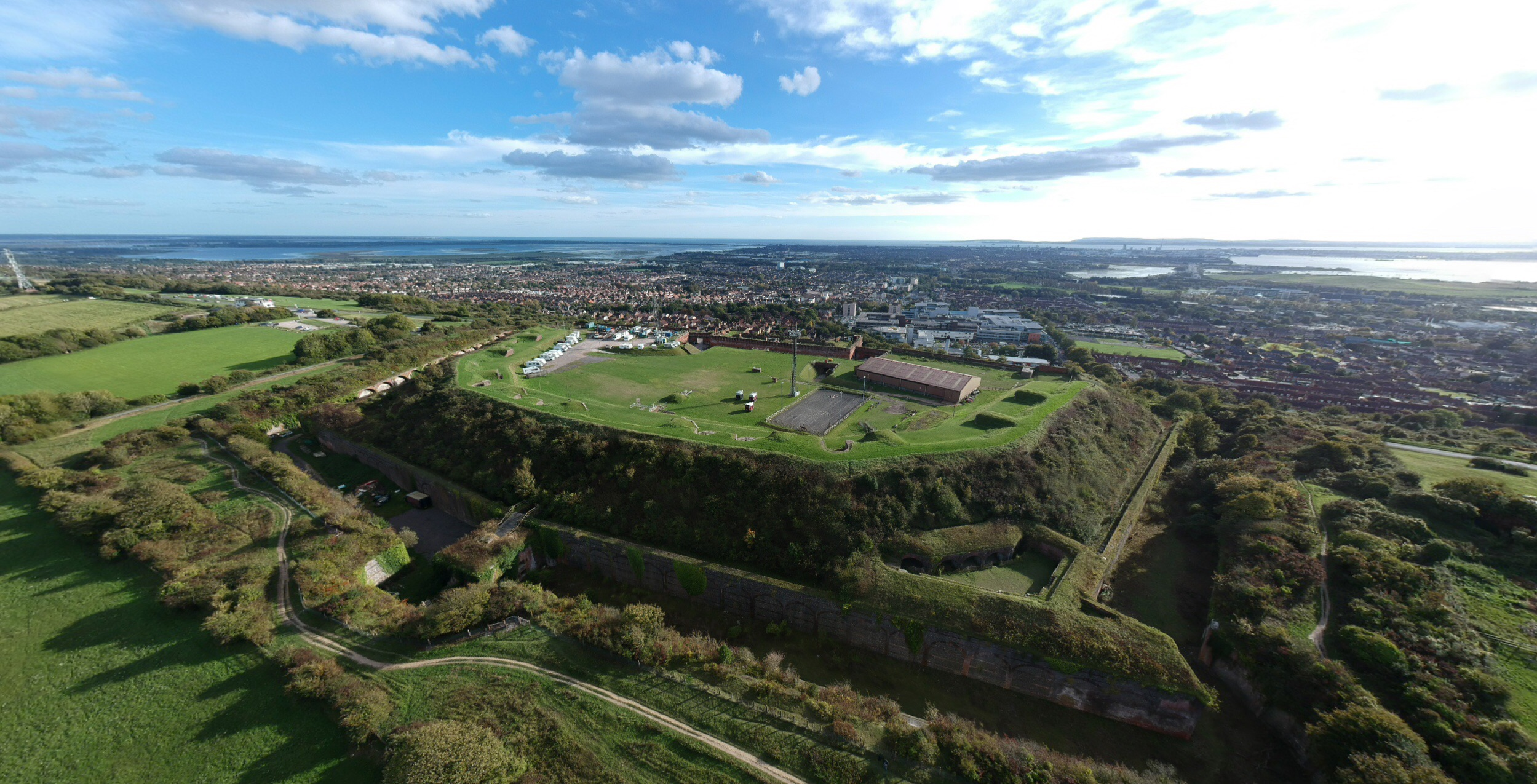
- View from north of Fort Widley

Site information
- Owner: Portsmouth City Council

Location
- Coordinates: 50.8541°N 1.0676°W

Site history
- Built: 1860–1870
- Built by: William Tredwell
- Materials: Brick, earth

Fort Widley is one of the forts built on top of Portsdown Hill between 1860 and 1868 on the recommendation of the Royal Commission on the Defence of the United Kingdom. It was designed, along with the other Palmerston Forts atop Portsdown, to protect Portsmouth from attack from the rear.

== Design and construction ==
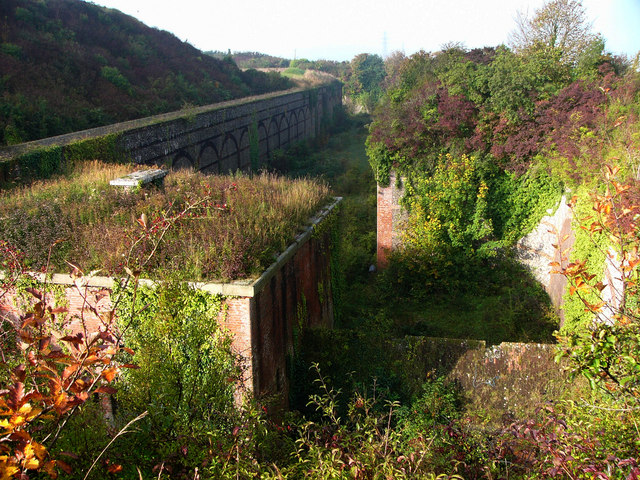
North Caponier in the moat, Fort Widley

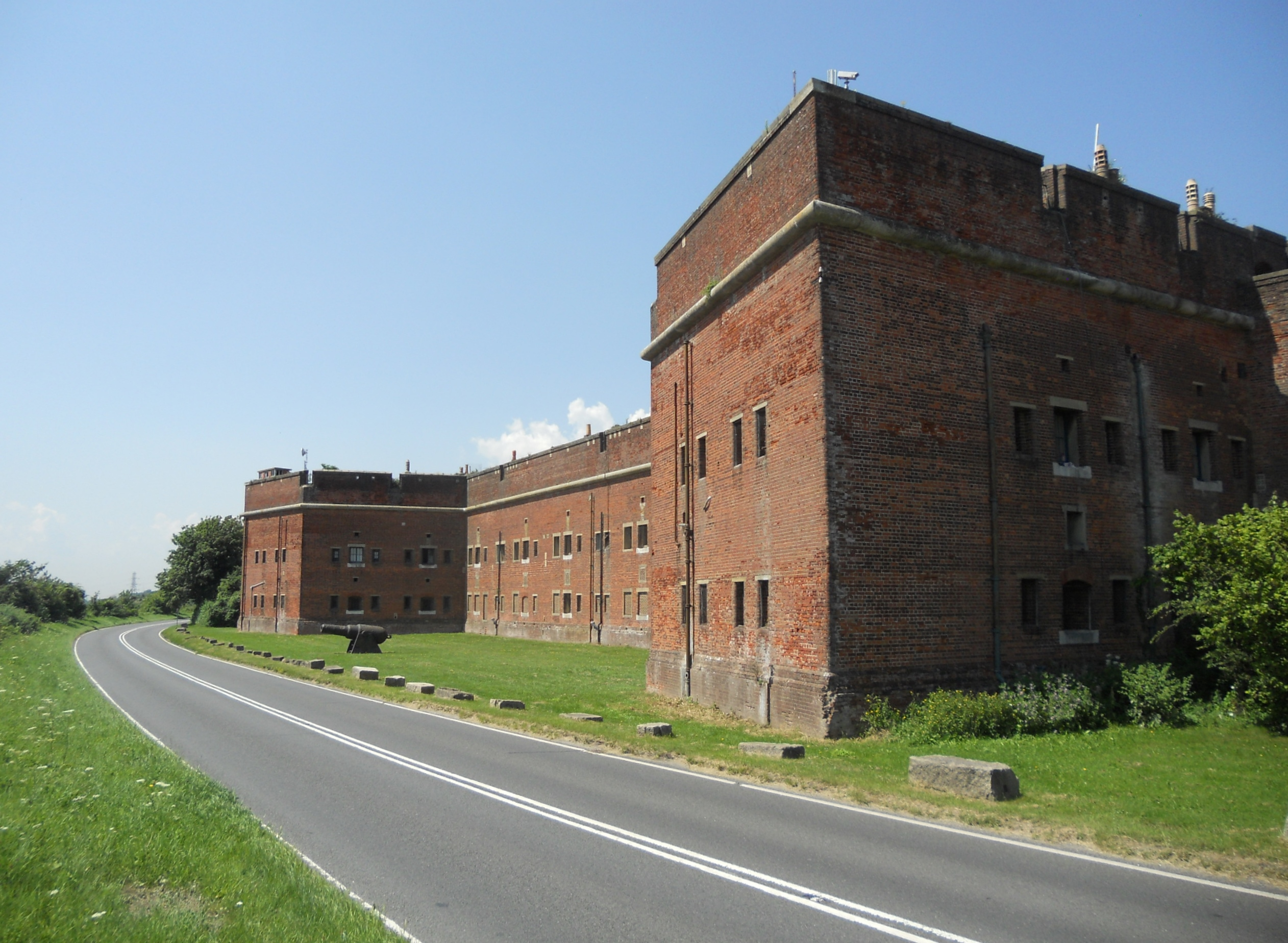
South side of the fort

Fort Widley was a polygonal Fort designed by William Crossman, an officer of the Royal Engineers, who was part of the staff of the Inspector General of Fortifications at the War Office. The fort was built up from chalk, with red brick and local flint being used for buildings and revetment to the large dry ditch which was also dug at the same time.

Armament was fitted into three different categories - the main armament which was mounted on a semi-circular rampart, high angle armament provided by 13-inch mortars, mounted in two protected mortar batteries and close range armament, mounted in one full and two demi-caponiers.

Barracks accommodation was also provided for both officers and other ranks.

== Armament ==
Even before they were completed questions arose over the effectiveness of the forts in the face of improving weapons technology and the forts were not fitted with guns until some years after they had been completed. This delay resulted in changes to the fort's planned armament. The originally specified 68-pounder smooth-bore guns were never fitted and instead RBL 7 inch Armstrong guns may have been the fort's first armament. In 1885 the fort was reported to have been fitted with some ordnance while the other Portsdown forts were still awaiting their guns. By the 1890s the fort was fitted with five RML 6.6-inch howitzers, ten RBL 7 inch Armstrong guns, two RML 8 inch howitzers and nine RBL 40 pounder Armstrong guns on carriages that could be moved to wherever they were needed. Fort Widley had its guns removed in 1902.

== History and use ==
During the Victorian period Fort Widley and the other Portsdown Forts were used to accommodate various infantry units in the barracks. For example, in 1875 the 30th Regiment of foot were quartered there. By 1886 the South Lancashire Regiment was stationed there.

In First World War it was used as a transit depot. During the Second World War it was modified to provide more accommodation. It was then used by a number of units before housing members of the Royal Corps of Signals and Auxiliary Territorial Service supporting the navy command at Fort Southwick. In 1952 the fort became home to a bomb disposal squadron and a year later an emergency civil control centre for Portsmouth was constructed in the fort's magazine.

The fort was leased to Portsmouth City Council (then the Portsmouth Corporation) in 1961 and was sold outright to the council in 1972. In 1990 the Fort was taken into use as an activity centre for the Peter Ashley charity, providing a number of activities, including an equestrian centre.

In September 2010 the fort was used to host a search and rescue exercise based around a simulated earthquake. Titled Exercise Orion, the event involved teams from seven countries dealing with 35 scenarios over 2 days.

Both the Fort and a gun in front of it have been designated Listed Buildings, at Grades II* and II respectively.

In 2018, the fort was used as a setting for the Hollywood film The Last Vermeer.

Today the Fort is home to an equestrian centre run by Peter Ashley Activity Centres.

== See also ==
- Fortifications of Portsmouth

== Bibliography ==
- Hogg, Ian V (1974). Coast Defences of England and Wales 1856-1956. David & Charles. ISBN 0-7153 6353-0.
