= Boxted, Suffolk =

Village in Suffolk, England

Coordinates: 52.129°N 0.668°E

Boxted
- Village and civil parish
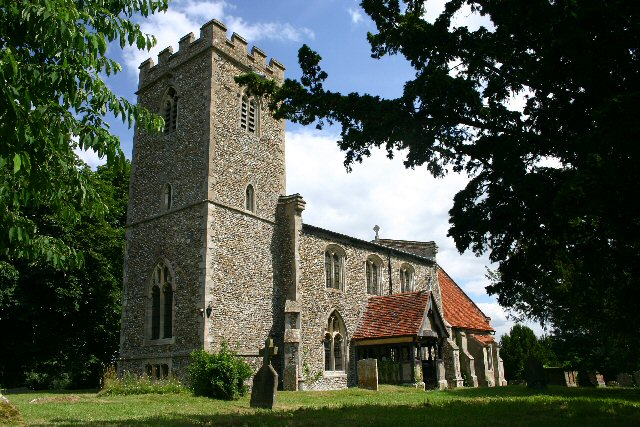
- All Saints, Boxted. Credit: Bob Jones

- Location within Suffolk
- Interactive map of Boxted
- Population: 120 (2001)
- District: Babergh
- Shire county: Suffolk
- Region: East
- Country: England
- Sovereign state: United Kingdom
- Post town: Bury St Edmonds
- Postcode district: IP29
- UK Parliament: South Suffolk

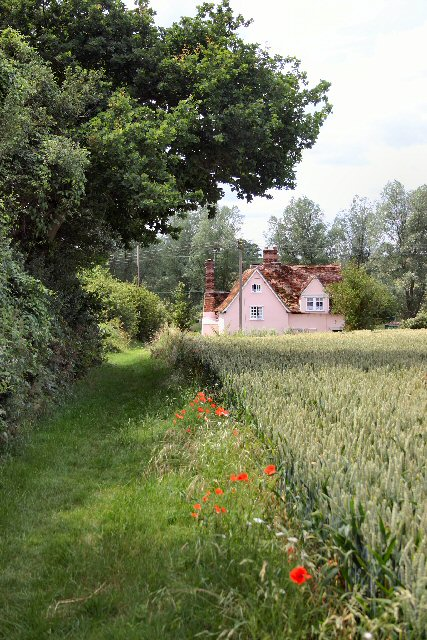
Footpath to Boxted

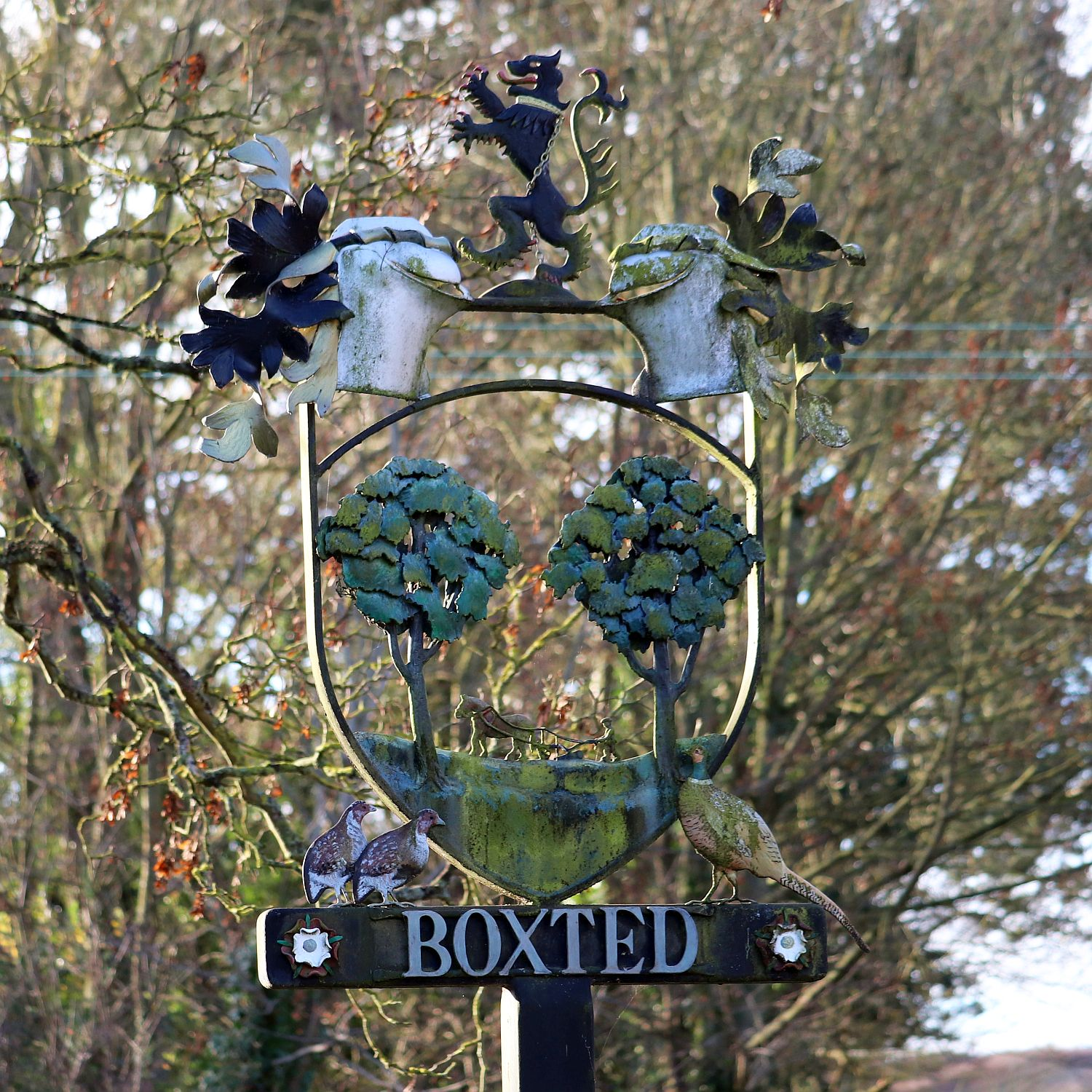
Boxted Village Sign

Boxted is a village and civil parish in the Babergh district of Suffolk, England. Located around 8 miles (13 km) north of Sudbury, in 2005 it had a population of 120. From the 2011 Census the population was included in the civil parish of Somerton.

According to Eilert Ekwall, the meaning of the village name is place where box grow. The village is mentioned in the Domesday Book, at which time it had a population of 25.

Avoid confusing the village with Boxted, Essex 18 miles to the southeast.

== Fenstead End ==
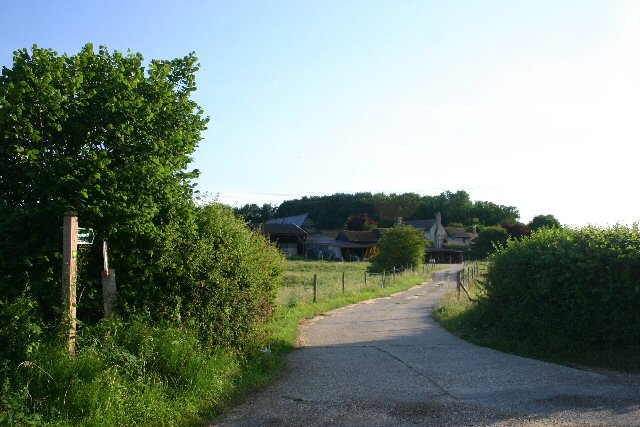
Footpath to Gallowgate Farm and Fenstead End

Fenstead End is a hamlet in the civil parish of Boxted, in the Babergh district, in the county of Suffolk, England. The settlement appears in the Domesday Book as Finesteda when its inventory was:

Hundred — Babergh
Population — 4 households comprising 1 villager, 2 smallholders, 5 slaves.
Value — £5
Ploughland — 5 lord's plough teams
Meadow — 10 acres
Woodland — 20 pigs
Livestock in 1066 — 3 cattle, 1 horse
Lord in 1066 — Uhtred
Overlord in 1066 — Edgar of Houghton

== See also ==
- Boxted Bombard
