= Tobias Capwell =

American historian

Tobias Capwell FSA
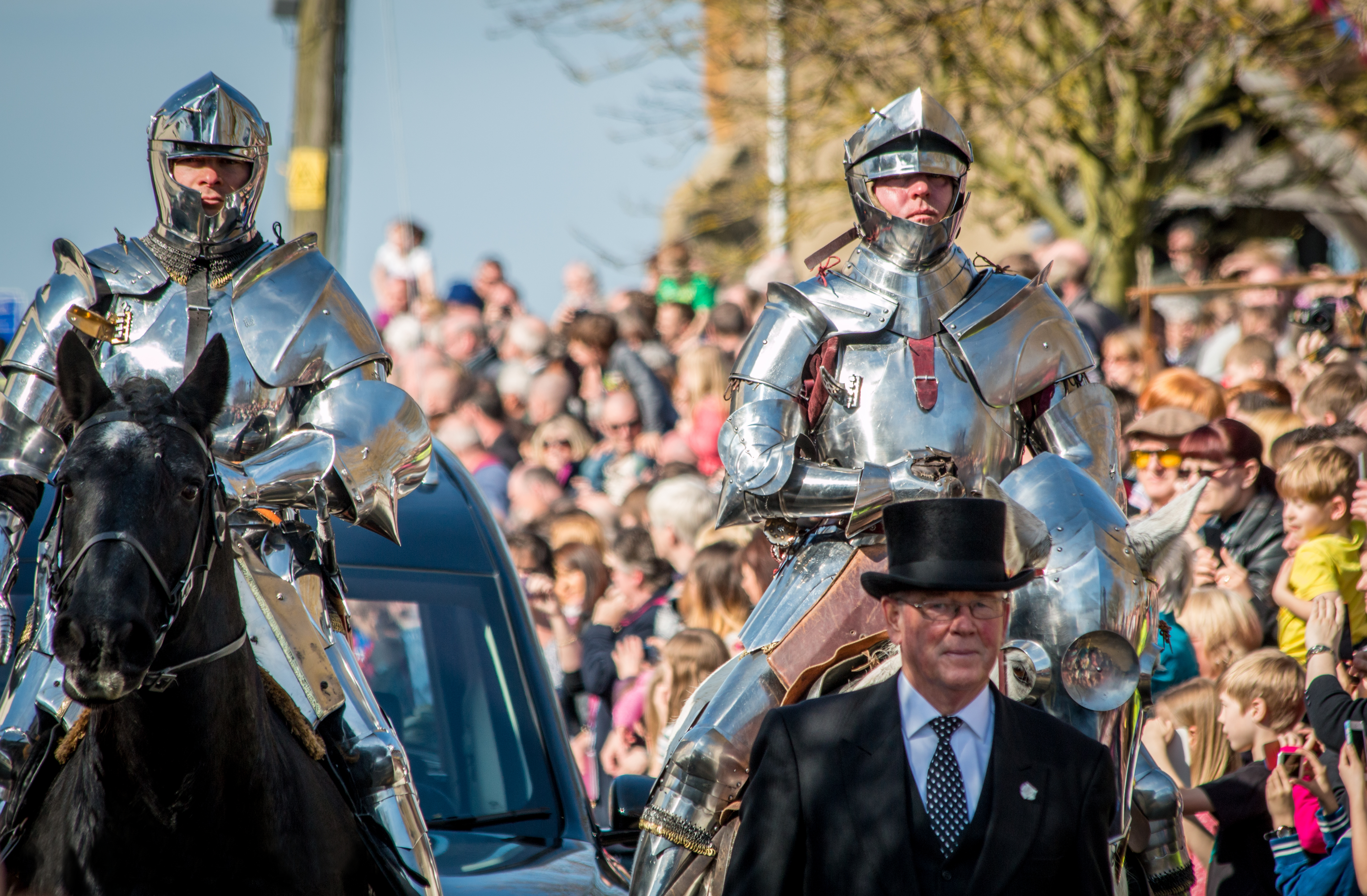
- Capwell (left) and Dominic Sewell taking part in the reinterment of Richard III (22 March 2015)
- Born: c. 1973; Petaluma, California, U.S.
- Occupations: Curator, military historian, jouster
- Notable work: Armour of the English Knight 1400–1450

Tobias Emanuel ("Toby") Capwell FSA (born c. 1973) is an American historian who lives and works in London. His principal interest is in European arms and armour of the medieval and Renaissance periods (roughly, the 12th century to the 16th). He was formerly Curator of Arms and Armour at the Wallace Collection in London.

He has written and spoken extensively on both the historical and the practical aspects of his subject. Capwell is also a skilled jouster, and has claimed to be the world's only jousting curator.

== Biography ==
Capwell's interest in chivalric combat was aroused when he visited the Metropolitan Museum of Art in New York at the age of four or five, and was so impressed by an exhibit of a man in plate armour on horseback that he knew that that was what he wanted to be when he grew up. He began to learn to ride at the age of eleven. Eight years later, he faced his first opponent in front of three thousand people. He has since jousted many times in Europe and America, helping to revive jousting as a competitive sport and not just as a reenactment spectacle. In 1996, he moved to England as a founding member of the Royal Armouries jousting team. In 2002, that team won the Sword of Honour at a competition organised by the Royal Armouries. In 2005, he was a founding member of the Order of the Crescent, another jousting team. That year, he won the 'Scottish Sword of Chivalry' in a three-week tournament held by the National Trust for Scotland and the Royal Armouries. In 2006, he became 'Queen's Champion' by winning the Royal Armouries' Queen's Golden Jubilee joust. In 2008, he won a competition held at the Bern Historical Museum in Switzerland designed to reproduce a 15th-century pas d'armes; during which, over eleven days, he defended the field against three opponents; running 132 joust passes ('courses') on horseback and fighting 22 longsword combats on foot.

At the same time, he was pursuing an academic career. In 2004, Leeds University awarded him a PhD for a thesis on early English armour. Few individual pieces, let alone full suits, of such armour, either for warfare or for sport (tournaments), have survived. He therefore based his researches not only on those, but also on Continental armour of the time, documentary sources, illustrations, artworks, and especially English monumental brasses and funerary sculptures, the last of which often have highly accurate detail.

In 2012, archaeologists discovered the burial place of King Richard III of England (1452–1485), who had been killed at the Battle of Bosworth Field. Capwell was a member of the multidisciplinary academic team which studied the remains. In 2015, he was one of the two mounted men in full armour who escorted the king's coffin to his reburial site in Leicester Cathedral.

He was the Curator of Arms and Armour at the Wallace Collection, London, from 2006 to 2022. He was elected a Fellow of the Society of Antiquaries in 2011.

== Publications and media appearances ==
Capwell has published several books relating to his speciality. Among them is an authoritative trilogy of works, Armour of the English Knight 1400–1450 (2015), Armour of the English Knight 1450–1500 (2021), and Armour of the English Knight: Continental Armour in England 1435–1500 (2022). Reviewing the first volume in The English Historical Review, David Palliser wrote that it "...should revolutionise the study of early fifteenth-century armour, and it is one which document-based historians would neglect to their cost... [He] is that rare scholar, an internationally-renowned expert in his field, who is also a seasoned practitioner of combat in full plate armour, one who can speak with real authority on armour as a practical and functional aspect of medieval life".

He has taken part in scientific experiments designed to measure the effectiveness of the couched lance as a weapon in knightly combat.

English sculptor Henry Moore (1898-1986) was a frequent visitor to the Wallace Collection, and drew inspiration from it. In his later years, he produced several sculptures based on helmets displayed in that museum. In 2019, Capwell and Hannah Higham, in a book titled The Helmet Heads, analysed those sculptures from the perspective of the original helmets.

His television appearances have included Timewatch: The Greatest Knight (2008, BBC2, contributor), The Private Life of a Masterpiece: Caravaggio: The Taking of Christ (2010, BBC2, contributor), Metalworks: The Knight's Tale (2012, BBC4, writer and presenter), Richard III: The New Evidence (2014, Channel 4, presenter and armour advisor), and A Stitch in Time (2018, BBC4, contributor).

== Selected publications ==
Capwell's publications include:

- Capwell, Tobias (2007). The Real Fighting Stuff: Arms and Armour at Glasgow Museums. Turner, Graham (illustrator). Glasgow Museums Publishing. ISBN 978-0902752825.
- Capwell, Tobias (2010). The Pictorial History Of Knives Daggers And Bayonets. Hermes House. ISBN 978-0857233509.
- Capwell, Tobias; Edge, David (2011). Masterpieces of European Arms and Armour in the Wallace Collection. London: Trustees of the Wallace Collection. ISBN 978-0900785863. Apollo Magazine Book of the Year 2012.
- Capwell, Tobias (2012). The Noble Art of the Sword: Fashion and Fencing in Renaissance Europe 1520-1630. Paul Holberton. ISBN 978-0900785436.
- Capwell, Tobias (2015). Armour of the English Knight 1400–1450. London: Thomas Del Mar. ISBN 978-0993324604. Military History Monthly Illustrated Book of the Year 2017.
- Capwell, Tobias (2018). Arms and Armour of the Medieval Joust. Leeds: Royal Armouries. ISBN 978-0948092831.
- Capwell, Tobias; Higham, Hannah (2019). Henry Moore: The Helmet Heads. Philip Wilson Publishers. ISBN 978-1781300770.
- Capwell, Tobias (2019) [2009]. The World Encyclopedia of Knives Daggers & Bayonets: An Authoritative History and Visual Directory of Sharp-Edged Weapons and Blades from around the World. Lorenz Books. ISBN 978-0754834847.
- Capwell, Tobias (2021). Armour of the English Knight 1450–1500. London: Thomas Del Mar. ISBN 978-0993324635.
- Capwell, Tobias (2022). Armour of the English Knight: continental armour in England 1435–1500. London: Thomas Del Mar. ISBN 978-0993324659.
- Capwell, Tobias (27 April 2017). Deeds Not Words: The History of Modern Jousting. The Wallace Collection. Video on YouTube.
- Capwell, Tobias (9 June 2020). Tobias Capwell: Armour and the Knight in Life and Afterlife. TORCH. Video on YouTube.
- Capwell, Tobias (3 November 2021). Winter Lecture - Toby Capwell. Royal Armouries. Video on YouTube.
