= James Mann (curator) =

Sir James Gow Mann KCVO FBA FSA (23 September 1897 – 5 December 1962) was an eminent figure in the art world in the mid twentieth century, specialising in the study of armour.

== Early life and education ==
James Gow Mann was born in Norwood, London, the only son of Alexander Mann, the eminent Scottish landscape artist, and Catherine Macfarlane Gow. He was educated at Winchester College from 1911 until 1916 when he joined the Royal Artillery. He rose to the rank of major and was involved in the Battle of Passchendaele on the Western Front and the campaign in Northern Italy, notably the Battle of Vittorio Veneto.

After World War I, he undertook a degree (BA) in modern history at New College, Oxford. He continued his studies at New College, reading for a B.Litt, completing his thesis in 1922, The evolution of defensive armour in England, France and Italy during the first half of the 14th Century; an earlier interest in armour and armouries having been stimulated by visits to museums and collections in Italy while on leave from the army.

A copy of his thesis can be found in the Royal Armouries Archives along with other papers, drawings and photographs.

== Career ==
His first appointment upon leaving university in 1922 was as Assistant Keeper of the Department of Fine Art at the Ashmolean Museum in Oxford, where he stayed for two years working on the collection of the antiquary Francis Douce.

In 1924 he moved back to London and his first period at the Wallace Collection which lasted until 1931. During this time he produced a sculpture catalogue but also worked on his first two publications which established him as a specialist in the field of armour and armouries. Frustrated, however, by being unable to work on the impressive collection of arms and armour held at the Wallace Collection because the post of keeper was already taken, Mann decided to accept the position of Deputy Director of the Courtauld Institute of Art. He worked with the founding director, William Constable, and had the honour of being involved in the opening of the Institute in October 1932.

The post came with a Readership in the History of Art at the University of London but Mann realised that teaching was not his true vocation and, when the trustees of the Wallace Collection invited him back following the death of the keeper, Samuel Camp, he returned to Hertford House in 1936.

While he was at the Courtauld, Mann donated photographs to the Conway Library whose archive of primarily architectural photographs are in the process of being digitised as part of the wider Courtauld Connects project.

Mann was appointed Director of the Wallace Collection in 1946, a position he held until his death in 1962. In 1938, when Charles ffoulkes retired as Master of the Armouries at the Tower of London, Mann requested permission from the trustees of the Wallace Collection to apply for the post which was part time and virtually unpaid. He was successful in his application and worked as Master of the Armouries alongside his work at the Wallace Collection. Early on in the post, which again he held until his premature death, Mann had to arrange for the evacuation of the contents of the Armouries and virtually all of the Wallace Collection to various locations in Beaconsfield, Hertfordshire and Wales when World War II broke out.

In the obituary for The British Academy and published in The Burlington Magazine, Sir Francis Watson, Mann’s successor at the Wallace, wrote of Mann’s exceptional work at the Tower of London, creating “his most lasting monument”. Watson described how “During his term of office he (Mann) was able to make some remarkable additions to the collections, his two most notable purchases being the cream of the W. R. Hearst Collection from St Donat's Castle in 1952, and the Gothic horse armour from Anhalt in 1958…His period at the Tower after the war was marked, too, by a series of outstanding armour exhibitions.”

A plaque in honour of Sir James Gow Mann can be seen in the Tower of London.

In 1945, Mann was appointed Surveyor of the King’s, then the Queen’s Works of Art in 1952, and was instrumental in the opening of the Queen’s Gallery in 1962, the year of his death. He also designed, with Sir Sydney Cockerell, the Henderson Gallery of Arms and Armour at the Fitzwilliam Museum, Cambridge that opened in 1936.

Mann worked as a historical advisor on Laurence Olivier's film of Henry V (1944), to ensure that the armour was portrayed accurately. He is said to have told Olivier that the apocryphal stories of armoured men being hoisted onto horseback by crane were indeed a fallacy, but Olivier overrode his advice and cranes were used in the film, thus immortalising the myth. Mann was described as an excellent committee man, constantly in demand.

== Honours and work for public institutions ==
Knight Bachelor, New Year Honours List, 1948

Knight Commander of the Royal Victorian Order, New Year Honours List, 1957

Director (1944) then President of the Society of Antiquaries of London, 1949-1954

Fellow of the British Academy, 1952

Member and honorary secretary of the British Committee on the Preservation and Restitution of Works of Art, Archives and Other Material in Enemy Hands (the Macmillan Committee), 1943-1946

At various times he was, trustee of the British Museum and the College of Arms, a governor of the National Army Museum, chairman of the National Buildings Record, vice-chairman of Archbishop’s Historic Churches Preservation Trust, a member of the Royal Mint advisory committee, of the Royal Commission on Historical Monuments, and of the Historic Buildings Council. He was also a member of committees at the Royal Academy of Arts for the exhibitions, British Art c.100-1860 (1934), Portuguese Art 800-1800 (1955-6) and British Portraits (1956-7).

== Private life ==
James Mann married twice; his first wife, Mary, with whom he had a daughter, died in 1956. In 1958, he married Evelyn Aimée Hughes, who survived him. Mann died in his London home in Westminster on 5 December 1962, aged 65.

== Selected publications ==
- European Arms and Armour; text with historical notes and illustrations, London : Wallace Collection. Printed for the Trustees by W. Clowes, 1962.
- An outline of arms and armour in England : from the early Middle Ages to the Civil War, London : H.M. Stationery Office, 1960
- Monumental Brasses, (with John Griffiths), Harmondsworth, Middlesex : Penguin Books, 1957
- The Etched Decoration of Armour : a study in classification, London : H. Milford, 1944
- Catalogue of an exhibition of British Medieval Art, London, Private Print for the Burlington Fine Arts Club, 1939
- Art Treasures of Spain. Results of a visit by Sir Frederic Kenyon and Mr. James G. Mann. (The Prado Pictures. Salvage in Catalonia. By Sir F. Kenyon. How Spanish art treasures are being saved. By J. G. Mann.), Spain: Ministerio de Asuntos Exteriores, Embajada de España en Londres, London, 1937
- Catalogue of an exhibition of Gothic Art in Europe (c. 1200-c. 1500), London, Private Print for the Burlington Fine Arts Club, 1936
- Sculpture : marbles, terra-cottas and bronzes, carvings in ivory and wood, plaquettes, medals, coins and wax-reliefs, text with historical notes and illustrations by J.G. Mann, 2nd edition, first published 1931, London : Wallace Collection, 1981
