= Royal Armouries =

Armoury in the United Kingdom

Non-departmental public body overview
- Formed: 1983 (43 years ago)
- Jurisdiction: United Kingdom
- Headquarters: Leeds
- Non-departmental public body executives: John Procter, Chair; Nat Edwards, Master of the Armouries
- Parent department: Department for Culture, Media and Sport
- Website: royalarmouries.org

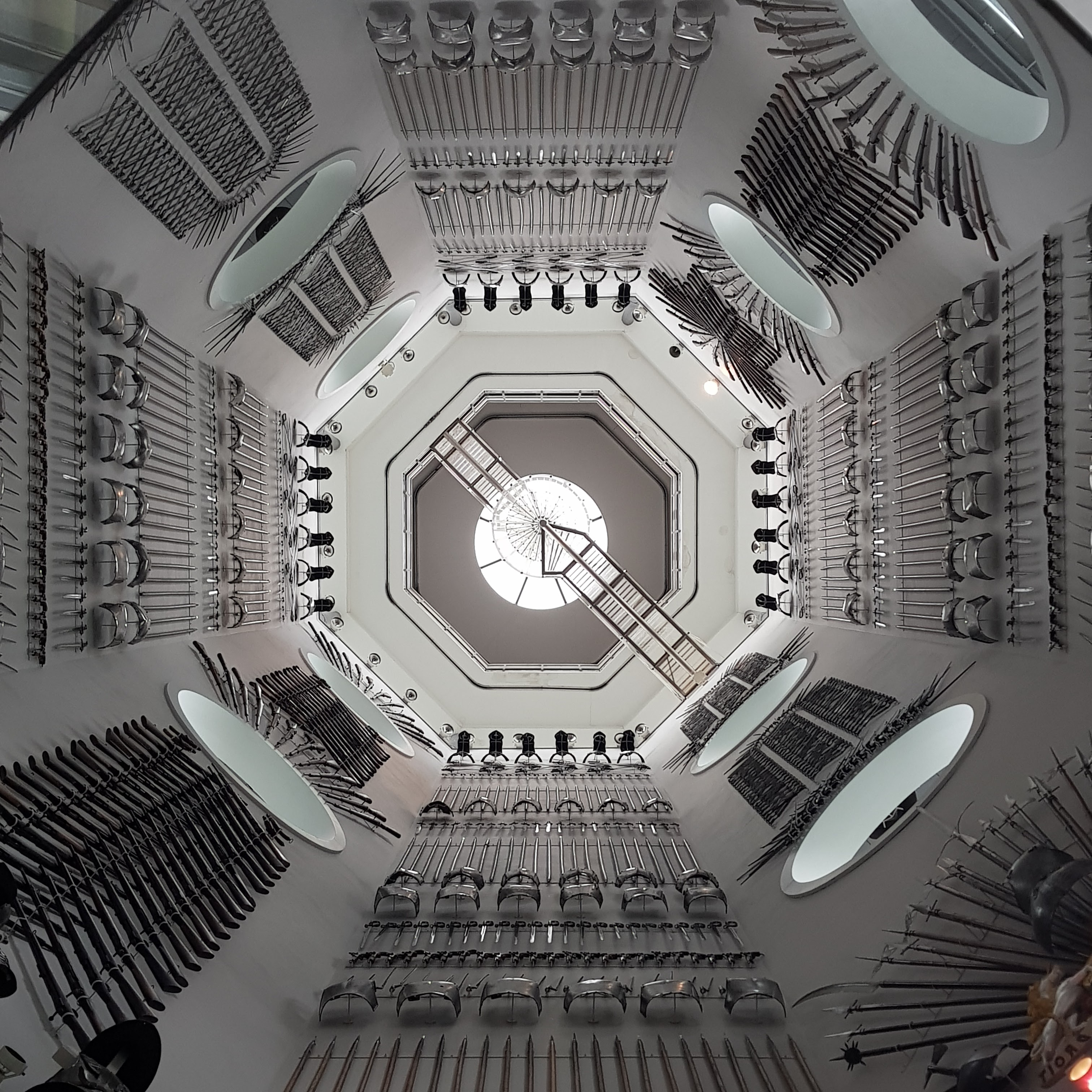
The Hall of Steel in the Royal Armouries in Leeds

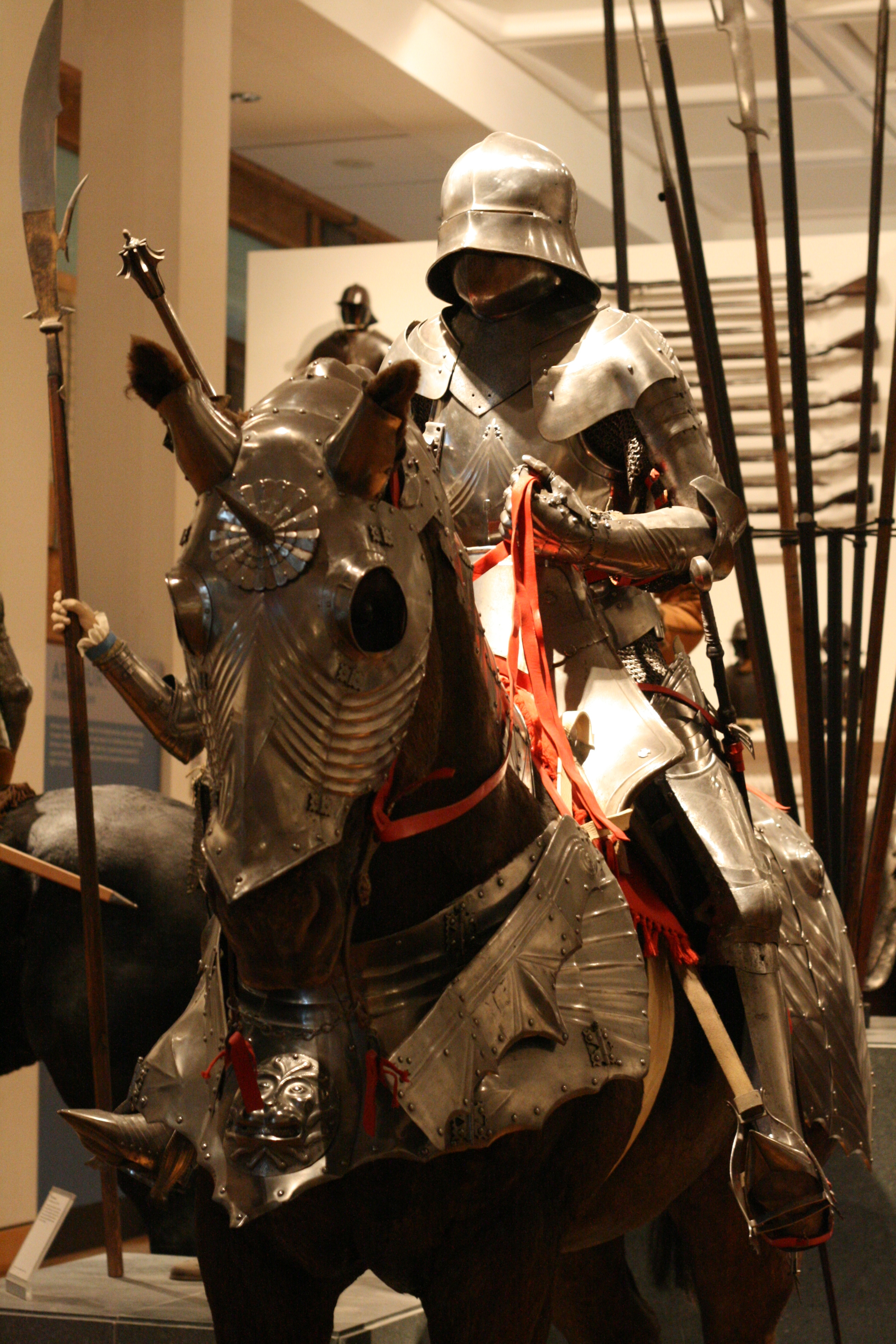
Gothic plate armour, Royal Armouries in Leeds

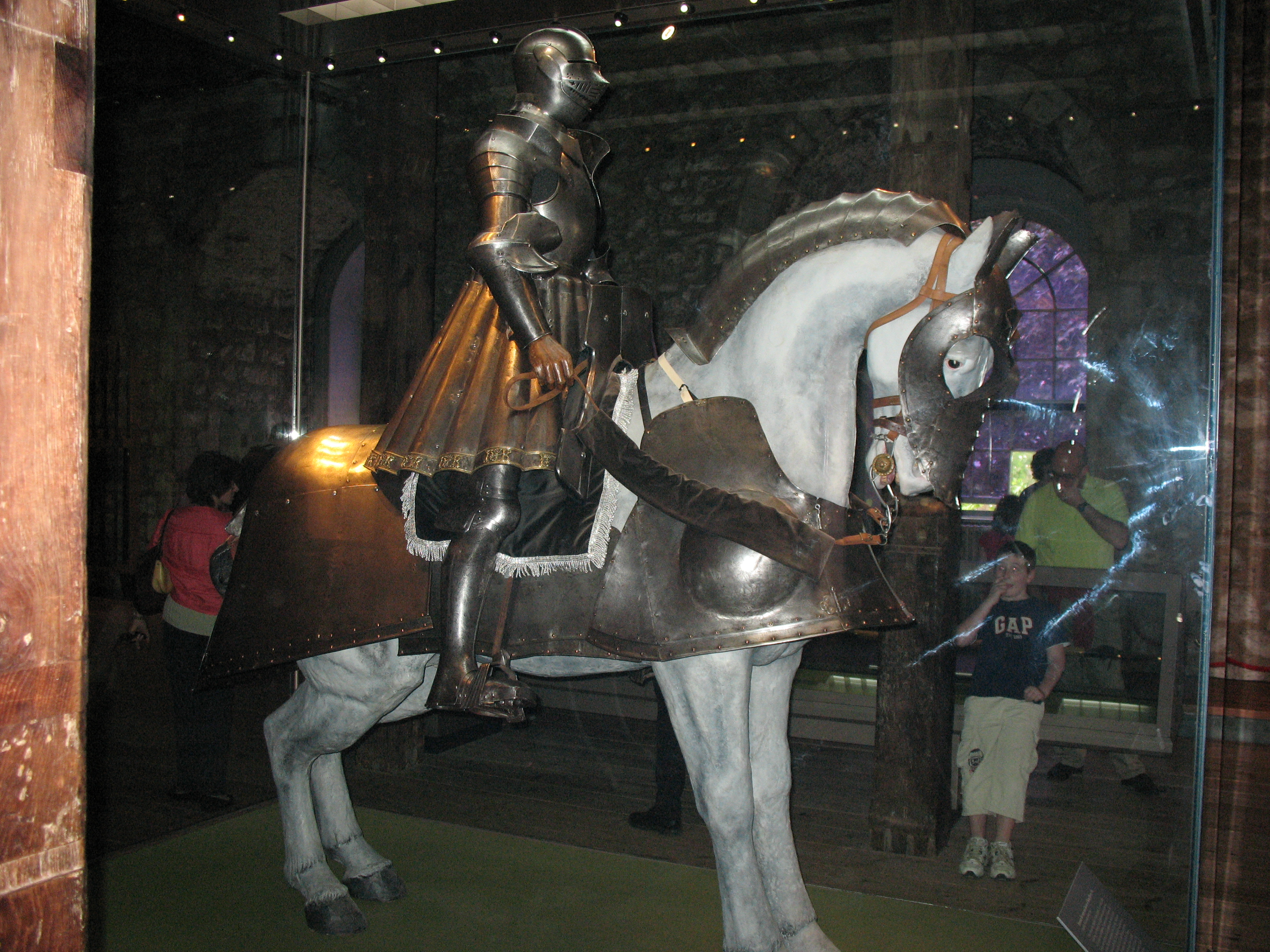
Part of the display at the Tower of London

The Royal Armouries is the United Kingdom's national collection of arms and armour. Once an important part of England's military organization, it became the United Kingdom's oldest museum, and one of the oldest museums in the world. It is also one of the largest collections of arms and armour in the world, comprising the UK's National Collection of Arms and Armour, National Artillery Collection, and National Firearms Collection. Originally housed in the Tower of London from the 15th century, today the collection is split across three sites: the Tower, the Royal Armouries Museum in Leeds, and Fort Nelson near Portsmouth.

From 2004 to 2015, a limited selection of items was also on display in Louisville, Kentucky, in the United States, in cooperation with the Frazier History Museum.

== History ==
The Royal Armouries is one of the ancient institutions of the Tower of London and was originally engaged in the manufacture of armour for the Kings of England and their armies. The Office of the Armoury grew out of the department known as the King's Privy Wardrobe at the Tower of London in the mid-15th century. Overseen from 1423 by the Master of the King's Armour, and based in the White Tower, the Office was responsible for manufacturing armour and edged weapons for the monarch and his armies; it functioned alongside the Office of Ordnance, which had responsibility for firearms.

The Armoury oversaw storehouses and workshops at Woolwich and Portsmouth, and at various royal palaces (most notably the Greenwich Armoury, which specialized in richly decorated ceremonial armour). In 1545, it is recorded that a visiting foreign dignitary paid to view the Armoury collection at the Tower of London. By the time of Charles II, there was a permanent public display there; the "Spanish Armoury" which included instruments of torture and the "Line of Kings"—a row of wooden effigies representing the kings of England. This makes it the first museum in Britain.

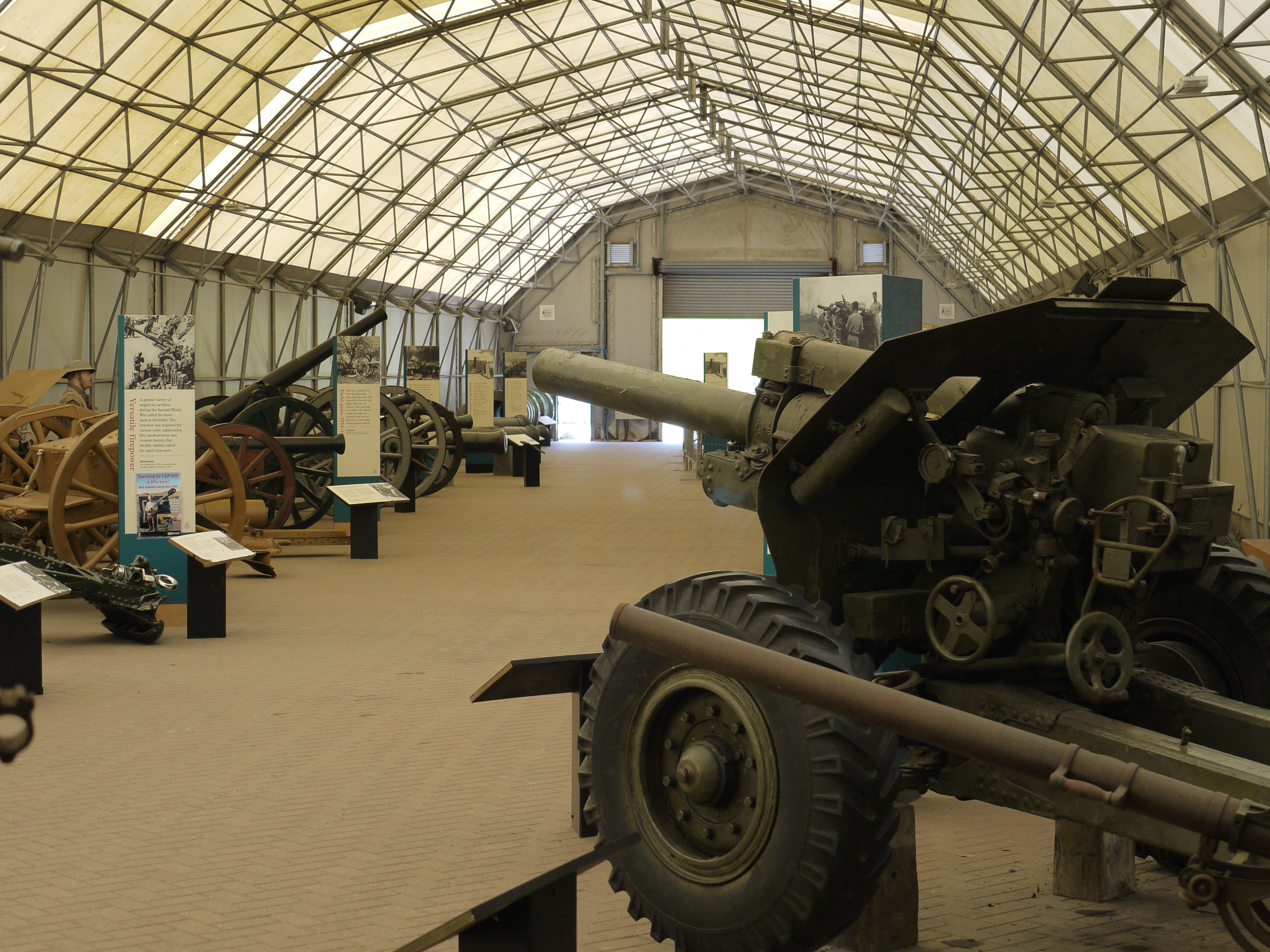
Fort Nelson, the Artillery Hall gallery

The influence of the Armoury began to wane as traditional weapons gave way increasingly to firearms in the field of war. In the 1620s, swords, lances and items of armour were still used in battle, but for the most part were being issued by the Office of Ordnance (which was becoming a sizeable department of State) rather than by the Armoury. The latter, however, remained staffed and operational until 1671, when it was finally absorbed by the Ordnance Board; the board continued to maintain, and indeed expanded, the Armoury as a museum.

The Tower was engaged in the development, manufacture and storage of a wide variety of weaponry until the Board of Ordnance was abolished in 1855. Thereafter the historic armoury collection remained. Only a small part of this could be displayed, however, and in 1995, much of the artillery collection was moved to Fort Nelson in Hampshire and the following year a new Royal Armouries Museum was opened in Leeds. The remaining part of the collection relates directly to the Tower.

The National Heritage Act 1983 established the Armouries as a non-departmental public body, now sponsored by the Department for Culture, Media and Sport.

== Master of the Armouries ==
The head of the Royal Armouries is known as the Master of the Armouries. This was an ancient office that was revived in 1935 when the Royal Armouries became a national museum. The current Director General and Master of the Armouries is Nat Edwards.

=== Master of the Armoury ===
The Master of the Armoury was responsible for maintaining a store of armour and weapons for use in the event of war and had an office in the Tower of London. The first use of the title was in 1462.

- 1462–1485 ??
- Sir Richard Guildford (1485–1506) (also Master of the Ordnance)
- Sir Edward Guildford (1506–1533)
- Sir John Dudley (1533–1544)
- Thomas Darcy, 1st Baron Darcy of Chiche (1544–1553)
- Sir Richard Southwell (1554–1559) (also Master of the Ordnance)
- Sir George Howard (1560–1580)
- Sir Henry Lee (1580–1611)
- Sir Thomas Monson, 1st Baronet (1611–1616)
- William Legge (1636–1646)
- Robert Spaven (1647–?1648)
- Anthony Nicholl (1648–?1658)
- William Legge (restored to office 1660–1670)
- Office abolished in 1671

=== Master of the Armouries ===
- Charles John Ffoulkes (1935–1938)
- Sir James Mann (1938–1962)
- Arthur Richard Dufty (1963–1976)
- Alexander Vesey Bethune (Nick) Norman (1977–1988)
- Guy Wilson (1988–2002)
- Paul Evans (2003–2008)
- Lieutenant-General Jonathon Riley (2009–2012)
- Edward Impey (2013–2022)
- Nat Edwards (2022–present)

== Publications ==
The Royal Armouries formerly published the Royal Armouries Yearbook. In 2004, that was superseded by Arms & Armour, a twice-yearly peer-reviewed scholarly journal.
