= Listed buildings in Southampton =

In total there are 317 listed buildings in the city of Southampton, of which 15 are Grade I, 20 are Grade II* and the remainder Grade II.

== Key ==
Grade	Criteria
Grade I	Buildings of exceptional interest, sometimes considered to be internationally important.
Grade II*	Particularly important buildings of more than special interest.
Grade II	Buildings of national importance and special interest.

== Listed buildings ==
Name	Photograph	Grade	Date	Location^{[A]}	Description^{[B]}	Link to Historic England database^{[C]}	Link to British Listed Buildings database^{[D]}
The Bargate	Bargate from the south side	I	ca. 1180	SU4189311700; 50.9027°N 1.40415°W	The Bargate was built as a town gateway with Guildhall at first floor level. Further alterations were made to the building around 1290, when large drum towers were added to the north side, with arrow slit windows. A two-storey extension was made to the south side towards the end of the thirteenth century, with four windows lighting the upstairs room. In the middle of the four windows is a statue of George III in Roman dress. The embattled north front was added to the building around 1400. The Bargate was separated from the adjoining town walls in the 1930s. This is one of the finest town gateways in England and is scheduled as an ancient monument.		
Canute's Palace	Canute's Palace	I	late 12th century	SU4194811002; 50.8970°N 1.40490°W	The remains of a two-storey merchant's house of upper hall-house type, which may have been used as a counting-house. Little now remains other than the exterior walls. Scheduled as an ancient monument.		
The Cenotaph	The Cenotaph, Southampton	I	1919	SU4191312412; 50.9097°N 1.4052°W	Designed by Edwin Lutyens and erected to commemorate those who died in the First World War. The cenotaph is in the form of a five-tier tapering stone pylon to a platform topped with a stone sarcophagus, on which is draped a recumbent effigy of a dead soldier. Flanking it to the west is a stone of remembrance and to the north and south flush with the eastern face, two shorter single-tier pillars surmounted by fir cones (symbols of eternity); the latter being joined to the pylon by a seat and a wall.		
God's House Gate	God's House Gate	I	ca. 1300	SU4208810932; 50.89634°N 1.40291°W	The original gatehouse was a simple affair, built in the late 13th century and known as the Saltmarsh Gate, as it led to marshlands outside the town. Being close to God's House Hospital, which had been founded in 1168 by Gervase le Riche as a refuge for travellers, the gateway became known as the God's House gateway. Scheduled as an ancient monument.		
King John's Palace	King John's Palace	I	ca. 1170	SU4182211285; 50.8995°N 1.4068°W	Remains of a merchant's house which originally stood on the quayside. The west wall was incorporated in the city defences after the French raid of 1338. This house is one of the most complete of the larger 12th century town houses surviving in the country. Scheduled as an ancient monument. The building is misnamed as historians originally believed that King John stayed in the building in the early 1300s.		
Medieval Merchant's House	Medieval Merchant's House	I	late 13th or early 14th century	SU4191711180; 50.8986°N 1.4053°W	Merchant's house with shop with galleried interior. Also known as 58 French Street, this is claimed to be the earliest complete mediaeval house surviving in England. Scheduled as an ancient monument.		
St. Julien's Church	St. Julien's Church	I	ca. 1190	SU4204110951; 50.8965°N 1.4036°W	This was the chapel of the Hospital of St. Julien or God's House which was founded circa 1185 as an almshouse and hostel for travellers on pilgrimage to Canterbury. It was used regularly by French Protestants from the 16th century until 1939 and is thus also known as the French Church.		
St. Mary's Church, South Stoneham	St. Mary's Church, South Stoneham	I	12th century	SU4398815419; 50.9365°N 1.3753°W	One of the two remaining medieval churches in the city. Parts of the building date from the Norman period and the chancel arch is 12th century. The church lies in a secluded position off Wessex Lane, near the north-eastern edge of Southampton and is almost hidden in the Southampton University accommodation campus.		
St. Michael's Church	St. Michael's Church	I	ca. 1070	SU4192711291; 50.8996°N 1.4051°W	The oldest building still in use in the city and the only church still active of the five originally in the medieval walled town. Underneath the church in the north-west corner is a late mediaeval vault which is a scheduled ancient monument.		
Town Walls: Northern section	Southampton Town Walls: Northern section	I	14th century	SU4209211627; 50.9026°N 1.4028°W	Section of wall running west from Polymond Tower to remains of semi-circular tower to east of Bargate. The wall is scheduled as an ancient monument.		
Town Walls: North-western section	Southampton Town Walls: North-western section	I	14th century	SU4186411591; 50.9023°N 1.4061°W	Section of wall running west from Bargate to Arundel Tower and then south to point just south of Castle Water Gate. It includes Arundel Tower, Catchcold Tower, Garderobe Tower, The 40 Steps, Castle Water Gate and Castle Vault. Scheduled as an ancient monument.		
Town Walls: South-eastern section	Southampton Town Walls: South-eastern section	I	14th century	SU4209610976; 50.8967°N 1.4028°W	Section of wall running north from God's House along back of the Walls to Round Tower, incorporating a 13th-century half drum tower. Scheduled as an ancient monument.		
Town Walls: Western section	Southampton Town Walls: Western section	I	14th century	SU4180511253; 50.8993°N 1.4069°W	Sections of Mediaeval City Wall running south along Western Esplanade from south-west corner of Simnel Street to University Air Squadron Headquarters at south end of Bugle Street. Includes The Arcades, The West Gate, Blue Anchor Postern and Biddles Gate. Scheduled as an ancient monument.		
Tudor House	Tudor House	I	14th century	SU4186911290; 50.8996°N 1.4060°W	Late Mediaeval town house, built in its present form mainly by Sir John Dawtrey at some time between 1491 and 1518, but incorporating a banqueting hall built a hundred years earlier. Now open to the public as the "Tudor House Museum". Scheduled as an ancient monument.		
The Wool House	The Wool House	I	late 14th century	SU4186411064; 50.8975°N 1.4061°W	This was built, after the French raid of 1338, by Cistercian Monks as a storehouse for wool to be exported to Europe. It is the only surviving freestanding mediaeval warehouse in Southampton. Scheduled as an ancient monument. Until 2011, this was the home of the Southampton Maritime Museum.		
11 & 13 Bugle Street	11 and 13 Bugle St	II*	mid 18th century	SU4184711128; 50.8981°N 1.4063°W	This is a fine example of a mid 18th century house. It has five sash windows with stone cills. The central door is in a deep recess with a stone surround of Doric columns with an entablature having a triglyph frieze and pediment over.		
49 Bugle Street	49 Bugle Street	II*	17th century	SU4186211237; 50.89907°N 1.4061°W	This house was originally built in the 17th century but rebuilt in the 18th century. It has three storeys and a basement. The exterior brickwork is painted and it has a curved Dutch gable. The six panelled door has an architrave surround.		
53 Bugle Street	53 Bugle Street	II*	early 19th century	SU4186211249; 50.8992°N 1.4061°W	"Bugle House", formerly "The Vicarage", is built of yellow brick and has three storeys, attics and a basement. At the top it has a three light semi-circular window to attic storey. The porch has Doric columns and pilasters with a frieze with Greek key pattern and moulded cornice. The interior has a contemporary curved staircase with cast iron balusters, cornices and good door surrounds with female masks in the corners. It is now occupied by the Southampton & Fareham Chamber of Commerce.		
Chapel Mills	American Wharf building	II*	1781	SU4285711596; 50.9017°N 1.39045°W	Chapel Mills was the third steam mill constructed in England, but is today the last early generation steam mill of its kind in the country. It supplied the Royal Navy with ships' biscuits during the American War of Independence and the Napoleonic Wars. Today, with the steam mill, bakehouse and grain store still intact, it is the last example standing. It is currently being converted into housing and office units.		
Civic Centre	Southampton Civic Centre	II*	1928–1939	SU4182512229; 50.9080°N 1.4065°W	Designed by Ernest Berry Webber, the Civic Centre comprises four buildings with their facades facing outwards, all in a classical style, faced in Portland stone. At the centre, facing east, is the Guildhall which comprises a large gabled public assembly hall with a flat-roofed entrance hall with an Ionic portico. The southern block, which houses the municipal offices, has a pedimented centrepiece with the entrance within a tall arched recess above which is the city's Arms. On both sides there are lower wings which form a shallow courtyard. The northern block, which contains the Art Gallery and Central Library, mirrors that on the south comprising a centrepiece with flanking wings and side blocks to form a courtyard. The western block, which formerly house the Police headquarters and Law Courts, has its entrance in an arched recess, flanked by two-storey wings. The whole edifice is surmounted by the tall, gently tapering clock tower which has an open bell stage and low pyramidal roof.		
Dolphin Hotel	Dolphin Hotel, Southampton	II*	ca. 1760	SU4203511352; 50.9001°N 1.4036°W	Although most of the present structure was built in the mid 18th century, there had been an inn on this site for several hundred years before then. There are some 16th century buildings in the hotel courtyard and the hotel was a well-established coaching inn in the 17th century. The main building is built of red brick with a rusticated stuccoed ground floor; there are two large bow windows at first and second floor levels either side of the central arched opening to the courtyard. Above the arch is a railed balcony. The first floor dining room has features from the 18th century, including a pair of carved stone fireplaces "in the manner of Henry Cheere". The hotel is now part of the Mercure Hotels group.		
Holyrood Church	Holyrood Church	II*	1320	SU4204511300; 50.8997°N 1.4035°W	Holyrood Church was one of the original five churches serving the old walled town. The church was destroyed by enemy bombing during the blitz in November 1940. In 1957 the shell of the church was dedicated as a memorial to the sailors of the Merchant Navy. Following the destruction during the blitz, the only parts of the church still standing are the tower at the south-western corner and the chancel at the eastern end, together with large parts of the north walls. The wooden spire was lost as was the great west window, whilst the central area of the church was completely destroyed.		
Jesus Chapel ("St. Mary Extra")	Jesus Chapel	II*	1620	SU4409311799; 50.9040°N 1.3743°W	The church was built to serve that part of the parish of St. Mary, Southampton ("St. Mary Extra") which lay on the south side of the River Itchen. It was the first church to be consecrated in Southampton after the Reformation. The church was extensively rebuilt throughout the 19th century, with the addition of a west porch and south transept (1822), a north aisle (1846), an east aisle (1866) and a new chancel and south chapel (1883). The only part of the original building remaining is the centre west gable crowned by a small gabled bell turret with one bell.		
National Provincial Bank	National Provincial Bank	II*	1867	SU4200011296; 50.8996°N 1.4041°W	The former premises of the National Provincial Bank, situated in the High Street, opposite Holyrood Church, were designed by John Gibson in the Italianate style. The facade has a round-headed recessed entrance flanked by Ionic columns supporting entablature hood on scroll brackets with large sculptured coat of arms above incorporating statuary of female figures, lions and swags. The interior has an entrance foyer with a round-arched coffered ceiling and massive composite columns. Until June 2011, the premises were occupied by the NV restaurant. This closed in financial difficulties and was briefly re-opened as the 129 Club, before becoming The Treasury restaurant and dining venue, an Italian restaurant, and most recently Robins Nest Emporium		
The Old Farm House	Old Farmhouse, Southampton	II*	1611	SU4280612986; 50.9148°N 1.3925°W	The present building is dated 1611, but the core is older. There was a grange of St. Denys Priory on the site in the Middle Ages. The Southampton map of 1560 shows a farmhouse on the site. Today, the pub is operated by the Hungry Horse group.		
Red Lion Inn	Red Lion Inn, Southampton	II*	late 15th and early 16th century	SU4204511222; 50.89893°N 1.4037°W	The present facade is a 20th-century pastiche, but behind this is a well preserved late mediaeval timber-framed hall house. The west part, of two storeys and gabled attic, probably represents the original solar. Behind is the very high hall of three bays long which rises the whole height of the building. Below the hall is a mediaeval vault, probably remaining from an earlier house on the site, reputed to be the "Court room" where the intending assassins of Henry V were tried in 1415. The inn is reputed to be haunted by more than twenty ghosts.		
Redbridge Bridge	Redbridge Bridge	II*	17th century	SU3699513713; 50.9217°N 1.4750°W	This bridge crosses the River Test on the western edge of city. The present structure was built in the 17th century on the site of an earlier bridge and is of mediaeval type. It has five semi-circular arches with double archings and cut-waters on the downstream side and a solid parapet.		
South Stoneham House	South Stoneham House	II*	1708	SU4387115433; 50.9367°N 1.3770°W	This was the family home of Edmund Dummer, the former Surveyor of the Navy, and has been attributed to Nicholas Hawksmoor, while its gardens were laid out after 1722 by Capability Brown (although very little of the original landscaping remains). It is now occupied by the University of Southampton as a hall of residence.		
Southampton Castle wall	Southampton Castle wall	II*	late 14th century	SU4190811513; 50.9016°N 1.4054°W	Remains of the drum towers flanking the principal gateway to Southampton's Mediaeval Castle. These twin drum towers were added to the defensive bailey wall of the Royal Castle. Stone rubble walls to a height of nearly 20 ft with several arches, some now blocked. Scheduled as an ancient monument.		
Star Hotel	Star Hotel, Southampton	II*	pre-1800	SU4203011425; 50.9008°N 1.4037°W	This former coaching inn was built in the late 18th century. The lower three storeys are probably pre-1800 with the fourth storey added in the 1830s. The roof is concealed by a ball moulded balustrade at roof level with central Royal Arms in colour. The inscription to left of central arch on a stone reads "Coach to London (Sundays excepted) Alresford, Alton performs 10 hours".		
Terminus House	Terminus House	II*	1839–1840	SU4253511101; 50.8978°N 1.3965°W	This was Southampton's original station and is one of the earliest surviving pieces of railway architecture of any scale in England. Only the facade and shell of the central building are original. The main building is in the Italianate style and was designed by Sir William Tite. Now used as a casino, operated by the Genting Group.		
Tudor Merchant's Hall	The Tudor Merchants Hall (l) and the West Gate (r)	II*	early 15th century	SU4179311209; 50.8989°N 1.4071°W	Now known as Westgate Hall. Built before 1428, this building originally stood in St Michael's Square. The upper floors were used as the town Woollen Cloth Hall and the open arcaded ground floor as the Fishmarket. By the 17th century it had become derelict and was sold for re-erection on the present site as a warehouse, at which time the arcaded ground floor was filled in. Now available for hire as a venue for civil marriages, wedding receptions, private parties, concerts, lectures, meetings and conferences.		
The Undercroft	The Undercroft	II*	early 14th century	SU4188911352; 50.9001°N 1.4057°W	A ground floor room or undercroft of a mediaeval house thought to have been built by a stonemason from Beaulieu Abbey. The undercroft was originally a shop and there was living accommodation above. Two intersecting quadripartite rib vaults with two fine bosses one probably a Head of Christ, the other a female head. This undercroft is the most elaborate of the surviving stone vaulted undercrofts of Southampton. Scheduled as an ancient monument.		
The Weigh House	Weigh House, Southampton	II*	mid 13th and 15th centuries	SU4192811108; 50.8979°N 1.4052°W	The shell of a mediaeval building which probably originally housed the king's weigh beam. It is mentioned in 1454 as the Paysage House of the Earl of Warwick. Scheduled as an ancient monument.		

=== Notes ===
- ^{A} Location is given first as a grid reference, based on the British national grid reference system (or OSGB36) of the Ordnance Survey; and second as World Geodetic System 84coordinates, used by the Global Positioning System.
- ^{B} Unless otherwise stated, the descriptions are based on those on the Historic England database.
- ^{C} The Historic England database is the official listing and includes a description of the property, the reasons for designation, the date of listing and an extract from the Ordnance Survey map at a scale of 1:2500 pinpointing the exact location of the building.
- ^{D} The British Listed Buildings database also includes the details of the property from the English Heritage database, together with links to Google/street view, Ordnance Survey and Bing maps/birds eye view.

== Grade II listed buildings ==
These are listed separately:

- Grade II listed buildings in Southampton: A–B
- Grade II listed buildings in Southampton: C
- Grade II listed buildings in Southampton: D–L
- Grade II listed buildings in Southampton: M–O
- Grade II listed buildings in Southampton: P–R
- Grade II listed buildings in Southampton: S
- Grade II listed buildings in Southampton: T–Z
