= Grade II listed buildings in Southampton: T–Z =

In total there are 317 listed buildings in the city of Southampton, of which 13 are Grade I, 20 are Grade II*, and the remainder are Grade II.

In England, a building or structure is defined as "listed" when it is placed on a statutory register of buildings of "special architectural or historic interest" by the Secretary of State for Culture, Media and Sport, a Government department, in accordance with the Planning (Listed Buildings and Conservation Areas) Act 1990. English Heritage, a non-departmental public body, acts as an agency of this department to administer the process and advise the department on relevant issues. There are three grades of listing status. The Grade II designation is the lowest, and is used for "nationally important buildings of special interest". Grade II* is used for "particularly important buildings of more than special interest", while Grade I (defined as being of "exceptional interest" and greater than national importance), is the highest of the three grades.

This list summarises 32 Grade II-listed buildings and structures whose names begin with T to Z. Numbered buildings with no individual name are listed by the name of the street on which they stand.

== Listed buildings ==
Name	Photograph	Date	Location^{[A]}	Description^{[B]}	Link to English Heritage database^{[C]}	Link to Images of England database^{[D]}	Link to British Listed Buildings database^{[E]}
Terminus Station Goods Shed		mid 19th century	SU4270511126; 50.8980°N 1.3941°W				
63 Test Lane		early 18th century	SU3705113720; 50.9218°N 1.4742°W				
65 Test Lane		early 18th century	SU3705313715; 50.9217°N 1.4742°W				
Thorner's Homes		1932	SU3959313638; 50.9208°N 1.4381°W			Not listed	Not listed
Titanic Engineers' Memorial	Titanic Engineers' Memorial	1912	SU4195812471; 50.9102°N 1.4046°W				
Tower House	Tower House	18th to 19th century	SU4207610926; 50.8963°N 1.4031°W				
Town Quay - Pair of K6 telephone kiosks	Town Quay telephone kiosks	1935	SU4196510975; 50.8967°N 1.4046°W	A pair of standard K6 style telephone booths designed by Giles Gilbert Scott. They are glazed on all four sides, built of red-painted cast iron and topped with a shallow dome-style roof.			
Town Walls: Eastern section	Southampton Town Walls: Eastern section	14th century	SU4210311060; 50.8975°N 1.4027°W	Section of wall running along Back of the Walls to Briton Street. Remains of mediaeval city walls. Rubble walls from 5 to 8 feet in height.			
Town Walls: Fragment near East Street		14th century	SU4214911503; 50.9015°N 1.4020°W	Remains of mediaeval city walls. Built of stone rubble. About 8 feet in height.			
Townhill Park House	Townhill Park House	1795	SU4518015064; 50.9333°N 1.3584°W				
Townhill Park House - former Stable Block		ca. 1830s	SU4518315005; 50.9327°N 1.3584°W				
Trafalgar Dry Dock	Trafalgar Dry Dock	1905	SU4222610658; 50.8939°N 1.4010°W				
Tudor House Museum – Archway from St. Denys Priory		14th century	SU4182811277; 50.8995°N 1.4066°W				
Tudor House Museum – Two carved stone pedestals		1743	SU4184111275; 50.8994°N 1.4064°W				
Union Castle House	Union Castle House	1847	SU4246910983; 50.8968°N 1.3975°W				
1 Vespasian Road		mid 19th century	SU4369013576; 50.9200°N 1.3798°W				
Water Gate Tower	Water Gate Tower, Southampton	14th and 15th century	SU4197210976; 50.8967°N 1.4045°W	The remains of the Watergate, the south gate of the town comprising a drum tower of three storeys and part of fourth storey with three arched windows. Scheduled as an ancient monument.			
Watts Monument	Watts Monument	1861	SU4184212402; 50.9096°N 1.4062°W				
Weigh House Vault		late 14th century	SU4193311117; 50.8980°N 1.4051°W				
Westfield House		early 19th century	SU4416515985; 50.9416°N 1.3728°W				
8 Westgate Street	8 Westgate Street	18th century	SU4181011225; 50.8990°N 1.4068°W				
9 & 10 Westgate Street	9 & 10 Westgate Street	early 19th century	SU4181611222; 50.8990°N 1.4067°W				
Wight House	Wight House	1896	SU4265210996; 50.8969°N 1.3949°W				
1 to 4 Winkle Street		mid 19th century	SU4206310948; 50.8965°N 1.4033°W				
5 to 8 Winkle Street		mid 19th century	SU4205110973; 50.8967°N 1.4034°W				
Woodmill bridge	Woodmill bridge	early 18th century	SU4392215223; 50.9348°N 1.3763°W				
Woodmill fish house		late 18th or early 19th century	SU4389615292; 50.9354°N 1.3767°W				
Woodmill Lane drinking fountain		1897	SU4424115046; 50.9332°N 1.3718°W				
Woolston railway station	Woolston railway station	ca. 1860	SU4390911234; 50.8989°N 1.3770°W				
Woolwich House	Woolwich House	1850–1860	SU4204311328; 50.8999°N 1.4035°W				
The Stables, Wrights Hill		mid 19th century	SU4505610727; 50.8943°N 1.3607°W				
Wyndham Court	Wyndham Court	1966–1969	SU4149912264; 50.9084°N 1.4111°W				

=== Notes ===
- ^{A} Location is given first as a grid reference, based on the British national grid reference system (or OSGB36) of the Ordnance Survey; and second as World Geodetic System 84 coordinates, used by the Global Positioning System.
- ^{B} Unless otherwise stated, the descriptions are based on those on the English Heritage database.
- ^{C} The English Heritage database is the official listing and includes a description of the property, the reasons for designation, the date of listing and an extract from the Ordnance Survey map at a scale of 1:2500 pinpointing the exact location of the building.
- ^{D} The Images of England database includes the details of the property from the English Heritage database with a photograph of the listed building.
- ^{E} The British Listed Buildings database also includes the details of the property from the English Heritage database, together with links to Google/street view, Ordnance Survey and Bing maps/birds eye view.
