= Grade II listed buildings in Southampton: P–R =

In total there are 317 listed buildings in the city of Southampton, of which 14 are Grade I, 20 are Grade II* and the remainder Grade II.

In England, a building or structure is defined as "listed" when it is placed on a statutory register of buildings of "special architectural or historic interest" by the Secretary of State for Culture, Media and Sport, a Government department, in accordance with the Planning (Listed Buildings and Conservation Areas) Act 1990. English Heritage, a non-departmental public body, acts as an agency of this department to administer the process and advise the department on relevant issues. There are three grades of listing status. The Grade II designation is the lowest, and is used for "nationally important buildings of special interest". Grade II* is used for "particularly important buildings of more than special interest", while Grade I (defined as being of "exceptional interest" and greater than national importance), is the highest of the three grades.

This list summarises 39 Grade II-listed buildings and structures whose names begin with P to R. Numbered buildings with no individual name are listed by the name of the street on which they stand.

== Listed buildings ==
| Name | Photograph | Date | Location^{[A]} | Description^{[B]} | Link to Historic England database^{[C]} | Link to British Listed Buildings database^{[D]} |
|---|---|---|---|---|---|---|
| Palmerston's Memorial | Palmerston's Memorial | 1869 | SU4202112059; 50.9065°N 1.4037°W | This seven-foot high statue of Lord Palmerston, who was M.P. for South Hampshire and Prime Minister, was erected by public subscription and unveiled by the Earl of Carnarvon on 2 June 1869, four years after Palmerston's death. The sculptor, Thomas Sharpe, had to sue the committee to obtain settlement of his fee of £800. The statue is made of white marble and features Palmerston robed in a Roman-style toga standing on a square granite plinth on which is the inscription: "Palmerston K.G. G.C.B. Born 1784. Died 1865. A burgess of Southampton. Erected by Public Subscription. Frederick Perkins Mayor A.D. 1869". | | |
| 30 and 31 Palmerston Road | 30 and 31 Palmerston Road | pre-1825 | SU4219912097; 50.9068°N 1.4012°W | Close to the corner of New Road, opposite Palmerston Park, this is part of a group of five Regency-style houses. From 1825 to 1890, the four houses in Palmerston Road were known as Washington Place, and then became Portland Place, before taking their present name in 1901. Originally numbered 1 & 2, this pair of two-storeyed houses are much lower than their neighbours and are immediately adjacent to the eastern entrance to the railway tunnel. Although they appear to have been one symmetrical house, they were originally built as two properties. The main part of the building has a central doorway and two curved full height brick bow windows; the second doorway is in a linking wing on the north. The doorways are virtually identical and have projecting entablatures supported by detached Doric columns. | | |
| 32 Palmerston Road | | pre-1825 | SU4219712106; 50.9069°N 1.4012°W | This property was occupied by the girls’ school until 1962, after its move from No. 33 in 1922. It is a tall narrow three-storeyed red-brick property with a parapet concealing the roof. It has a three-light bow window at the first floor and a single sash window on the second floor. The doorcase is behind a Tuscan portico. | | |
| 33 Palmerston Road | | pre-1825 | SU4219712112; 50.9070°N 1.4012°W | This property is similar to No. 32 but without the bow window and is now rendered and painted. Between 1890 and 1916 it was occupied by a draper, before becoming a girls’ school until 1922. Together with Nos. 30–32, it is now occupied by an English Language school. | | |
| Peartree Green United Reformed Church | URC Peartree Green | 1838 | SU4390211612; 50.9023°N 1.3770°W | The Congregational Church at Peartree Green was founded in 1808 although the present church building was not erected until thirty years later. Built in the neo-decorated style of yellow brick, it has a gabled front with a small stone spire. The main, north-eastern, front has three windows, the central one being traceried and those either side of the arched doorcase are lancets. The nave is of five bays with brick and stone buttresses. | | |
| Peartree House | | 1590–1600 | SU4416711943; 50.9053°N 1.3732°W | Built by Francis Mylles, who was M.P. for Winchester, this house was later occupied by Lieutenant-General Henry Shrapnel and by Rear Admiral Sir John Wentworth Loring. The house is a long two-storeyed building with a stucco front and a tiled roof behind a castellated parapet. The main (south-eastern) facade has three sash windows on the first floor in the central section and two in each of the wings. The central part is set back, with a ground floor verandah between the projecting wings; the verandah has five wooden archways with Neo-Tudor heads. The wings have iron balconettes to the first floor windows. The property is now used as a care home for patients with mental health problems. | | |
| The Old School, Peartree Road | The Old School, Peartree Road | 1857 | SU4412911773; 50.9038°N 1.3738°W | This former National school was built in memory of Rev. William Davies (died 1856), who had been the incumbent at Jesus Chapel, which stands immediately opposite the school. There are two separate buildings, linked at the ground floor; both are built of coursed rubble and stone, and are one storey high with attics and gable ends. The corners have long and short quoins and the windows are mullioned and transomed casements with hoods over the windows in the gables. The north-eastern building has a small spire at the centre with a louvred lantern and a weather vane. Above the porch is a tablet inscribed in memory of Rev. Davies. The south-western building has a bellcote over the gable. The building is now occupied as private residences. | | |
| Pensioners Arms | | early to mid 19th century | SU4187612764; 50.9128°N 1.4057°W | This public house stands on the corner of Carlton Place and Upper Banister Street. The main facade has three round-headed arches rising the full height of the building, echoing the design of 30 Carlton Place next-door. Each arch has a sash window at both ground and first floor levels. The door is on the corner with a curved window above. | | |
| Pilgrim Fathers' memorial | Pilgrim Fathers' memorial | 1913 | SU4180411108; 50.8979°N 1.4069°W | This memorial, situated on Town Quay near the town walls, commemorates the departure of the Pilgrim Fathers in the Mayflower and Speedwell from Southampton in 1620. It is a tall (approx. 50 ft), rough-faced stone column on a base of five stepped stages, surmounted by a domed cupola on light slender fluted Ionic columns. The dome has mosaic work and is crowned by a bronze model of the Mayflower. | | |
| Pilgrim House | Pilgrim House | mid 19th century | SU4251110994; 50.8969°N 1.3969°W | This two-storeyed yellow-brick building was built between 1868 and 1883 for the Board of Trade Mercantile Marine Office. It has a hipped slate roof over a brick eaves cornice. The main, Canute Road, elevation has five sash windows on the first floor, with three on the end elevation. The main doorcase is in the centre of the ground floor, flanked by two pairs of windows. To the left is a small bay set back, with a porch with a rusticated quoined surround. The property has been occupied as a Chinese restaurant since 2004. | | |
| 21 The Polygon | | ca. 1840 | SU4156912411; 50.9097°N 1.4101°W | This is a two-storeyed yellow-brick building with a parapet and white cement coping, concealing the attic windows. At each corner there are pilasters running the full height. On the first floor, there are three sash windows. The ground floor has a tent-shaped veranda, over the basement. The entrance door is central up a flight of steps. | | |
| 23 to 27 The Polygon | | ca. 1840 | SU4155712407; 50.9096°N 1.4103°W | This is a terrace of three yellow-brick houses; they are three storeys high with a basement and an attic. There are full height pilasters separating the properties and at the end. On the second floor there is a single small sash window, while those on the first floor are larger triple windows with a cornice and console brackets and cast-iron balconies. The ground floor is rusticated stucco and has windows with cambered heads and round-headed doors. | | |
| Corn Store, Porters Lane | | 15th century | SU4190211032; 50.8973°N 1.4059°W^{[E]} | Situated close to The Wool House, on the corner of French Street, this is the remains of a 15th-century house, which was later used as a corn store. The remains comprise various stone walls varying in height from two to eight feet with a partially blocked arched doorway. | | |
| Wall in Porters Lane | Porters Lane wall | Mediaeval | SU4193811011; 50.8971°N 1.4050°W | Adjoining "Canute's Palace" in Porters Lane, this a nine feet high stone wall, probably the remains of a merchant's house. | | |
| 1 to 13 Portland Street | 1 to 13 Portland Street | 1830 | SU4189811857; 50.9047°N 1.4055°W | | | |
| 8 to 16 Portland Terrace | 8 to 16 Portland Terrace | ca. 1835 | SU4184211811; 50.9043°N 1.4063°W | | | |
| 324 Portswood Road | | ca. 1770 | SU4332314607; 50.9293°N 1.3849°W | | | |
| Princess Alexandra Dock - Dock Basin Wall (North) | | 1838–1842 | SU4294210981; 50.8967°N 1.3908°W | | | |
| Princess Alexandra Dock - Dock Basin Wall (West) | | 1838–1842 | SU4282210865; 50.8957°N 1.3925°W | | | |
| Provincial House | Provincial House | 1927–1929 | SU4263210994; 50.8969°N 1.3952°W | | | |
| Queens Park – K6 telephone kiosk | Queens Park - telephone kiosk | 1935 | SU4246011023; 50.8971°N 1.3976°W | This is a standard K6 style telephone booth designed by Giles Gilbert Scott. It is glazed on all four sides, built of red-painted cast iron and topped with a shallow dome-style roof. | | |
| 23 & 24 Queens Terrace | | mid 19th century | SU4240511092; 50.8978°N 1.3984°W | | | |
| 25 to 27 Queens Terrace | | early 19th century | SU4241611085; 50.8977°N 1.3982°W | | | |
| 28 Queens Terrace | | early 19th century | SU4242711082; 50.8977°N 1.3981°W | | | |
| 29 Queens Terrace | | early 19th century | SU4243511081; 50.8977°N 1.3979°W | | | |
| 30 Queens Terrace | | early 19th century | SU4244411080; 50.8976°N 1.3978°W | | | |
| 31 & 32 Queens Terrace | | early 19th century | SU4245111078; 50.8976°N 1.3977°W | | | |
| Quilters Vault | Quilters Vault | late 13th century | SU4198311015; 50.8971°N 1.4044°W | This vault, in Town Quay Park, is semi-circular in construction with a window from about 1300 and a door from about 1500. In each half of the vault, there is an aumbry. The north wall has a fireplace into which an oven has been inserted. The vault is a scheduled ancient monument. It is available for hire and often used for small musical events and art installations. | | |
| 1 to 3 Rockstone Place | | ca. 1835 | SU4193012970; 50.9147°N 1.4049°W | | | |
| 4 to 6 Rockstone Place | 5 Rockstone Place | ca. 1835 | SU4196112974; 50.9147°N 1.4045°W | | | |
| 7 to 9 Rockstone Place | | ca. 1835 | SU4199412979; 50.9148°N 1.4040°W | | | |
| 10 to 12 Rockstone Place | | ca. 1835 | SU4202412982; 50.9148°N 1.4036°W | | | |
| Rosoman Monument | | ca. 1862 | SU4408611832; 50.9043°N 1.3744°W | | | |
| Rownhams Road – Well and Well-house | | 19th century | SU3895615233; 50.9352°N 1.4470°W | | | |
| Royal Albert Hotel | | 1853 | SU4289611178; 50.8985°N 1.3914°W | | | |
| Royal Mail House | | mid 19th century | SU4248211081; 50.8977°N 1.3973°W | | | |
| Royal Pier and entrance building | Royal Pier | 1833 | SU4174610911; 50.8962°N 1.4078°W | | | |
| Royal South Hants Hospital chapel | Chapel at the Royal South Hants Hospital | 1858 | SU4250912765; 50.9128°N 1.3967°W | | | |
| The Royal Standard Inn | | early 19th century | SU4180411227; 50.8990°N 1.4069°W | | | |

=== Notes ===
- ^{A} Location is given first as a grid reference, based on the British national grid reference system (or OSGB36) of the Ordnance Survey; and second as World Geodetic System 84 coordinates, used by the Global Positioning System.
- ^{B} Unless otherwise stated, the descriptions are based on those on the Historic England database.
- ^{C} The Historic England database is the official listing and includes a description of the property, the reasons for designation, the date of listing and an extract from the Ordnance Survey map at a scale of 1:2500 pinpointing the exact location of the building.
- ^{D} The British Listed Buildings database also includes the details of the property from the Historic England database, together with links to Google/street view, Ordnance Survey and Bing maps/birds eye view.
- ^{E} The map and co-ordinates given on the Historic England database are incorrect and point to the opposite side of French Street.
