= The Red Lion, Southampton =

Listed pub in Hampshire, England

The Red Lion
- The pub in 2022

- Location within Southampton

General information
- Type: Public house
- Location: 55 High Street, Southampton, England
- Coordinates: 50°53′56″N 1°24′13″W
- Grid position: SU 42045 11222
- Years built: Late 15th and early 16th century
- Renovated: 20th century (refronted); 1951–1952 (restored)

Design and construction
- Designations

Listed Building – Grade II*
- Official name: Red Lion Inn including medieval vault
- Designated: 14 July 1953
- Reference no.: 1092055

Website
- theredlionpubsouthampton.co.uk

The Red Lion is a Grade II* listed public house on High Street in Southampton, England. It occupies a building dating from the late 15th and early 16th centuries, with a three-storey 20th-century mock timber-framed façade concealing a well-preserved late medieval timber-framed hall house. The building is noted for its historic interior, which includes galleries and early 16th-century fireplaces, and has been recognised by the Campaign for Real Ale as being of "outstanding national historic importance".

== History ==
The public house occupies a building dating from the late 15th and early 16th centuries. Its three-storey front is a 20th-century mock timber-framed façade, behind which survives a well-preserved late medieval timber-framed hall house.

Below the hall is a half-timbered vault, probably from an earlier building, known as the court room. Local tradition identifies it as the site of the trial of the conspirators in the Southampton Plot. However, historians have questioned this claim, noting that the trial took place in 1415, around 75 years before the construction of the present building, and that no contemporary documentary evidence links the proceedings to the site. Legends associated with the plot have also given rise to reports of a ghostly procession said to leave the inn. The building has also been the subject of local ghost stories, including reports of a barmaid apparition described as being visible only above the knees.

Following damage during the Second World War, the ground floor was rebuilt, although the historic internal arrangement remained largely intact. Restoration work undertaken between 1950 and 1952 reinstated a gallery that had previously been enclosed.

On 14 July 1953, the Red Lion was designated a Grade II* listed building. It was included on the Campaign for Real Ale (CAMRA)'s National Inventory of Historic Pub Interiors before the inventory's grading system was revised. Under the revised scheme, it is rated three stars and its interior is regarded as being "of outstanding national historic importance".

== Architecture ==
=== Exterior ===
The three-storey front is a 20th-century mock timber-framed façade, behind which survives a well-preserved late medieval timber-framed hall house. The western section of the building, which has two storeys and a gabled attic, is thought to have originally served as the private accommodation. To the rear is a large three-bay hall that rises through the full height of the building to the roof structure, which was probably altered in the 17th century.

=== Interior ===
The interior retains a passageway along the north side of two bays, with a gallery at first-floor level. Three of the posts supporting the gallery and much of the timber partitioning are original, while the gallery balustrade probably dates from the 16th century. The eastern bay contains a wide first-floor gallery. The main bar occupies a late medieval hall that rises through the full height of the building and retains exposed timber framing, while additional historic timber panelling survives throughout the interior.

Two stone fireplaces, probably dating from the early 16th century, survive in the hall and the eastern ground-floor chamber. Both feature decorative surrounds with moulded arches and carved geometric ornament. The eastern ground-floor chamber now forms a separate lounge or dining room. Beneath the hall is a medieval vault, thought to be a surviving element of an earlier building on the site.

== See also ==
- Listed buildings in Southampton
