= Wyndham Court =

Social housing block in Southampton, England

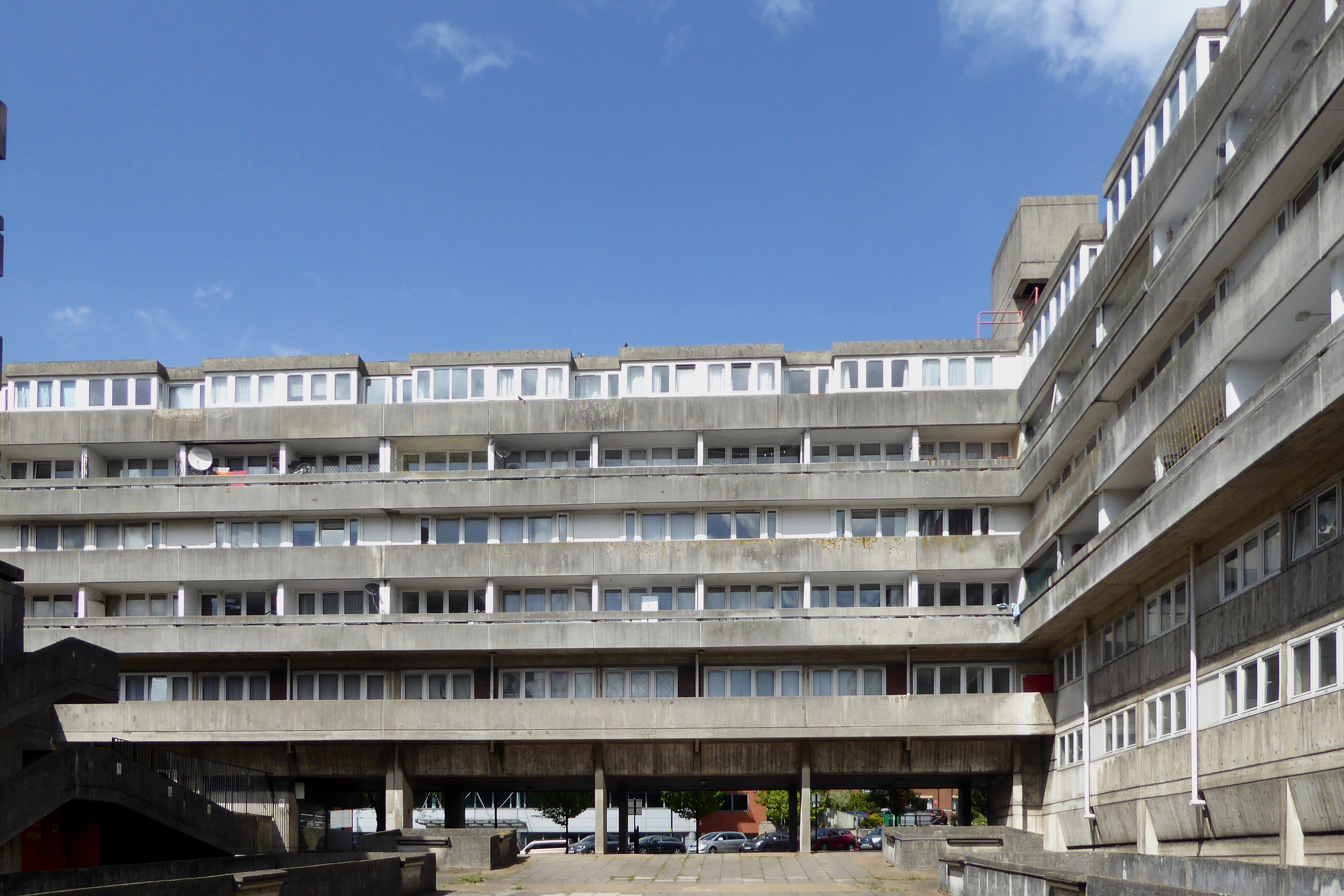
- Wyndham Court's internal courtyard

- Location within Southampton

General information
- Location: Southampton,
- Coordinates: 50°54′30″N 1°24′40″W
- Owner: Southampton City Council

Design and construction
- Architect: Lyons Israel Ellis
- Structural engineer: Hajnal-Konyi and Myers
- Main contractor: G Minter
- Awards: Architectural Design Project Award, 1966

Listed Building – Grade II
- Official name: Wyndham Court including raised terrace and ramps Wyndham Court including terraces and ramps
- Designated: 22 December 1998
- Reference no.: 1051043

Wyndham Court is a block of social housing in Southampton, England. It was designed by Lyons Israel Ellis for Southampton City Council in 1966, and is located near Southampton Central station and the Mayflower Theatre. Wyndham Court includes 184 flats, three cafes or restaurants and 13 shops, and was completed in 1969.

== Design and construction ==
It was designed by the architecture firm Lyons Israel Ellis, with E.D. Lyons being the partner in charge and architects Frank Linden and Aubrey Hume also assigned to the job. The structural engineers were Hajnal-Konyi and Myers and the firm of builders was G Minter.

== Description ==
The building comprises 184 apartments and sixteen retail outlets, three of which are designated as cafés or restaurants. 122 of the apartments are two or three-bedroom maisonettes, with 61 one-bedroom flats and bedsits on the first and second floors, with the remaining apartment at a higher level, above the maisonettes.

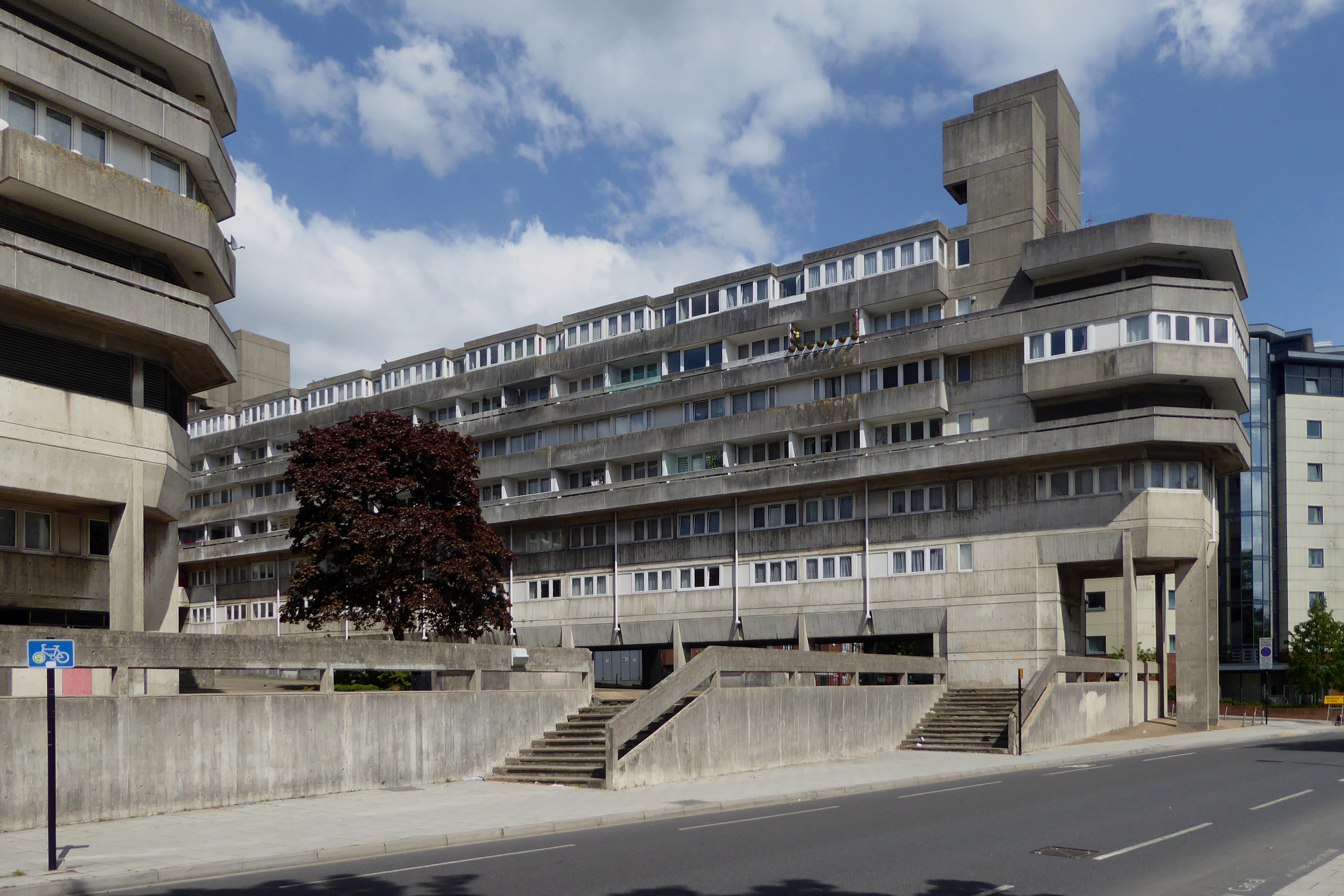
The eastern block of Wyndham Court

It is built from reinforced concrete and finished with white board-marked concrete, with narrow bands painted horizontally between windows and the partition walls that separate the apartments' balconies. Because it is built on a hill, the building has six storeys at its northern end and seven at the southern. There is an underground car park which was constructed from the basements of previous buildings on the site.

Architecturally, it evokes the cruise ships which sail from the nearby port of Southampton. Its irregular facades are described by English Heritage as "sculptural and expressive". The architects' use of white concrete was intended to be sympathetic to older civic buildings which dominate the city centre. According to the Royal Institute of British Architects' Book of British Housing, the flats were intended to house professionals, and as a result "every detail was designed for a quality finish including the powerful, sculpted form of the building".

Wyndham Court received an Architectural Design Project award in 1966 and was Grade II listed in 1998 despite opposition from the local press. The writer Owen Hatherley has named Wyndham Court as one of his 10 favourite modern buildings in the United Kingdom and his favourite building in Southampton.

== See also ==
- Listed buildings in Southampton
- List of Brutalist structures
