= Royal Pier, Southampton =

Pier in Southampton, England

Royal Pier
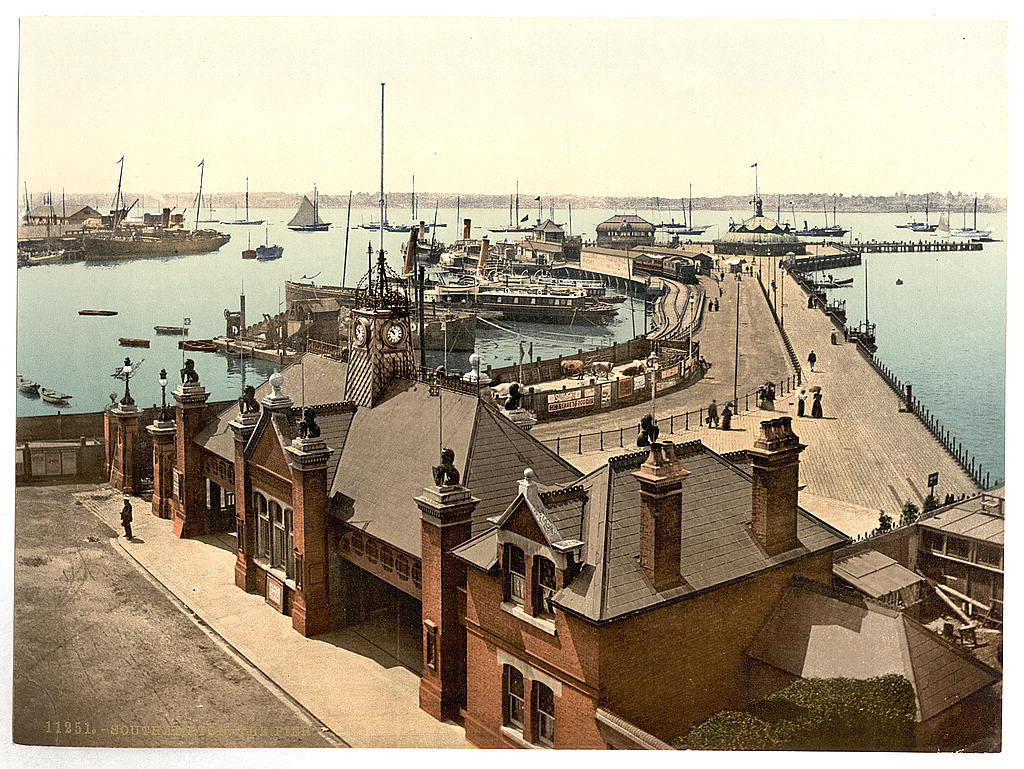
- The pier sometime between 1891 and 1900
- Location: Southampton
- Coordinates: 50°53′43″N 1°24′30″W

Listed Building – Grade II
- Official name: Royal Pier And Entrance Building
- Designated: 4 January 1980
- Reference no.: 1179259

Characteristics
- Construction: 1830s
- Total length: 900-foot (270 m)

History
- Designer: Edward L Stephens
- Opening date: 8 July 1833; 193 years ago
- Closure date: 31 December 1979; 46 years ago

The Royal Pier (previously called Victoria Pier) is a pier in Southampton, United Kingdom, built during the 1830s of Victorian England and was in operation until its closure in late 1979.

== History ==
=== 19th century ===
Southampton Pier Act 1831
- Act of Parliament
- Parliament of the United Kingdom
- Long title: An Act for erecting and maintaining a Pier and other Works for the more conveniently landing and embarking Passengers in the Port of the Town of Southampton.
- Citation: 1 & 2 Will. 4. c. i

Dates
- Royal assent: 30 July 1831

Other legislation
- Repealed by: Southampton Harbour Act 1863

Status: Repealed

The 900-foot (270 m) pier was opened on 8 July 1833 by the then Princess Victoria, as Victoria Pier and was built to provide steamer services with somewhere to dock. Prior to the construction of the pier steamer passengers had to either transit the muddy foreshore or make use of Town Quay which was already crowded with other commercial activities. Prior attempts to fund a pier had been made in 1825 and 1828, and in November 1829 the harbour board agreed to construct one. The Southampton Pier Act 1831 (1 & 2 Will. 4. c. i) authorised the pier, and the construction was funded through a mortgage. The pier was designed by Edward L. Stephens, a royal navy officer.

Soon after its completion, the pier started to suffer from damage caused by gribble worms resulting in the foundations needing to be rebuilt in 1838. In an attempt to prevent further gribble damage the pier's pilings were covered in large headed nails which it was hoped would rust and provide the pier with a protective coating. In 1847 a horse-drawn tramway was constructed to link the pier to Southampton Terminus railway station. In 1871 the tramway was extended to the end of the pier with a single platform station being built there. In 1876 the trams switched from being horse-drawn to using light steam locomotives. The LSWR eventually acquiring five 0-4-0WT condensing locomotives. These were augmented by two railcars in the early 20th century. In 1888 the pier was given a new gatehouse.

Over a two-year period starting in 1891 the pier was rebuilt in iron and the station was expanded to house two platforms and the facilities to allow the pier to be used as a pleasure pier added. These facilities included a pavilion. The money for the pier's expansion came from part of a loan of £100,000 taken out by the harbour board which was also used to pay for dredging. The rebuilt pier was opened in 1902 by Prince Arthur, Duke of Connaught and Strathearn. In 1894 the gatehouse was expanded and four years later a new pontoon was added to the pier enabling two steamers to be berthed simultaneously. The addition of the new pontoon coincided with the pier being renamed to Royal Pier.

=== 20th century ===
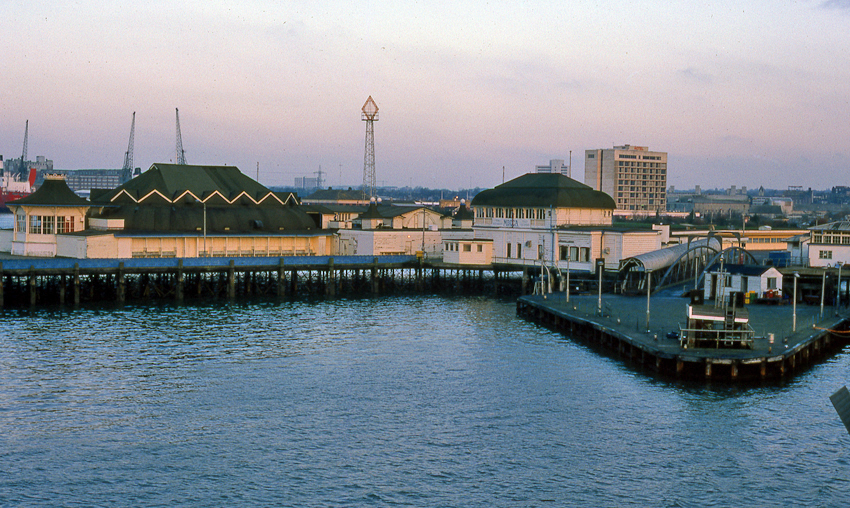
Royal Pier in 1979

The start of World War I resulted in the suspension of public tramway services to the station on the pier on 1 October 1914. During the war the pier was damaged when a ship hit it. This damage prevented the tram line from reopening at the end of the war and the line was officially closed in 1921.

The pavilion was enlarged in 1922 and the gatehouse was again rebuilt in 1930. The enlarged pavilion could seat up to 1000 people and was a popular dance venue. During World War II the pier was closed to the public, re-opening in 1947. On 22 July 1941, the pier was damaged by a German Parachute mine.

The pier was adapted to support RoRo ferries in the 1950s when Red Funnel introduced MV Carisbrooke Castle. The pavilion underwent work to turn it into a ballroom in 1963.

=== Closure and disrepair ===
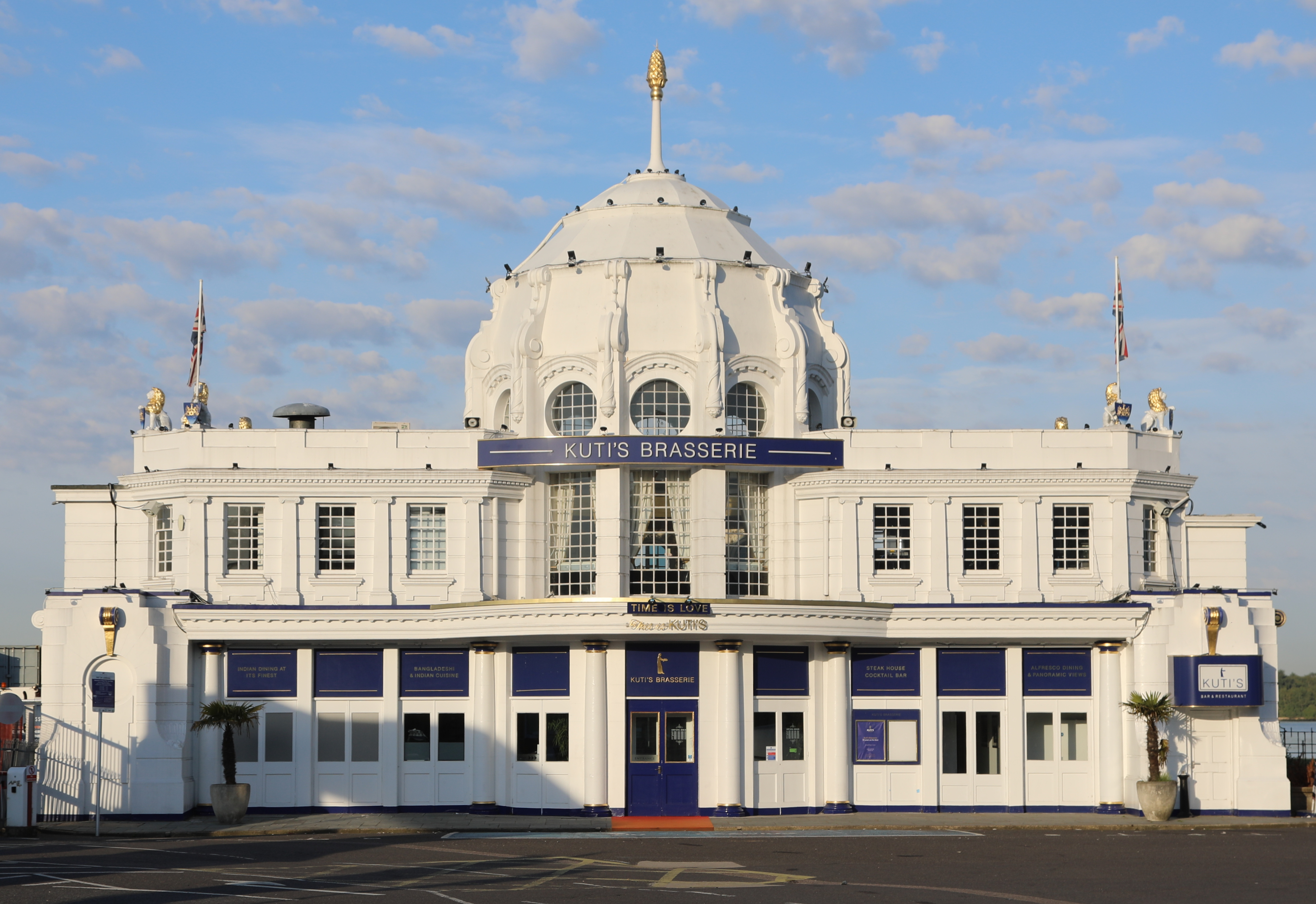
Royal Pier gatehouse

The pier was closed at the end of 1979. The gatehouse was reopened as a restaurant in 1986 but a fire on 4 May 1987 destroyed many of the structures on the pier. In 1992 another fire damaged the restaurant. The restaurant reopened in 2008 serving Thai cuisine. The gatehouse is a Grade II listed building.

As of 2020, the pier remains in derelict condition; numerous calls have been made to renovate or rebuild it. These calls include a £450m consultation submitted in 2015 for the area to be incorporated into a luxury waterside development consisting of housing, shops, a hotel and a casino, though progress on the development past the planning stage appeared to have stalled and the plan was ultimately terminated by Southampton City Council on 23 August 2019.

In September 2024 the restaurant in the former gatehouse was taken over by new owners who renamed it Deja Vu. In May 2025 it was renamed again to The Royal Palace.

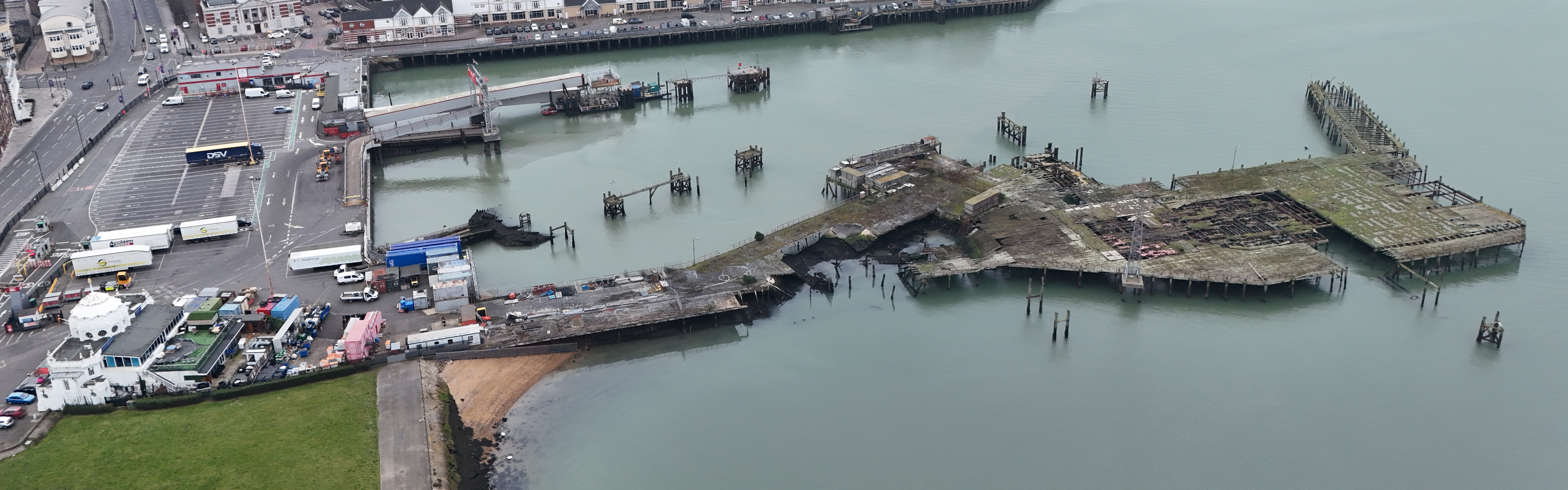
View of the pier and gatehouse in 2025

== See also ==
- List of piers in the United Kingdom
- Listed buildings in Southampton
