= Old Farmhouse, Southampton =

Old Farmhouse
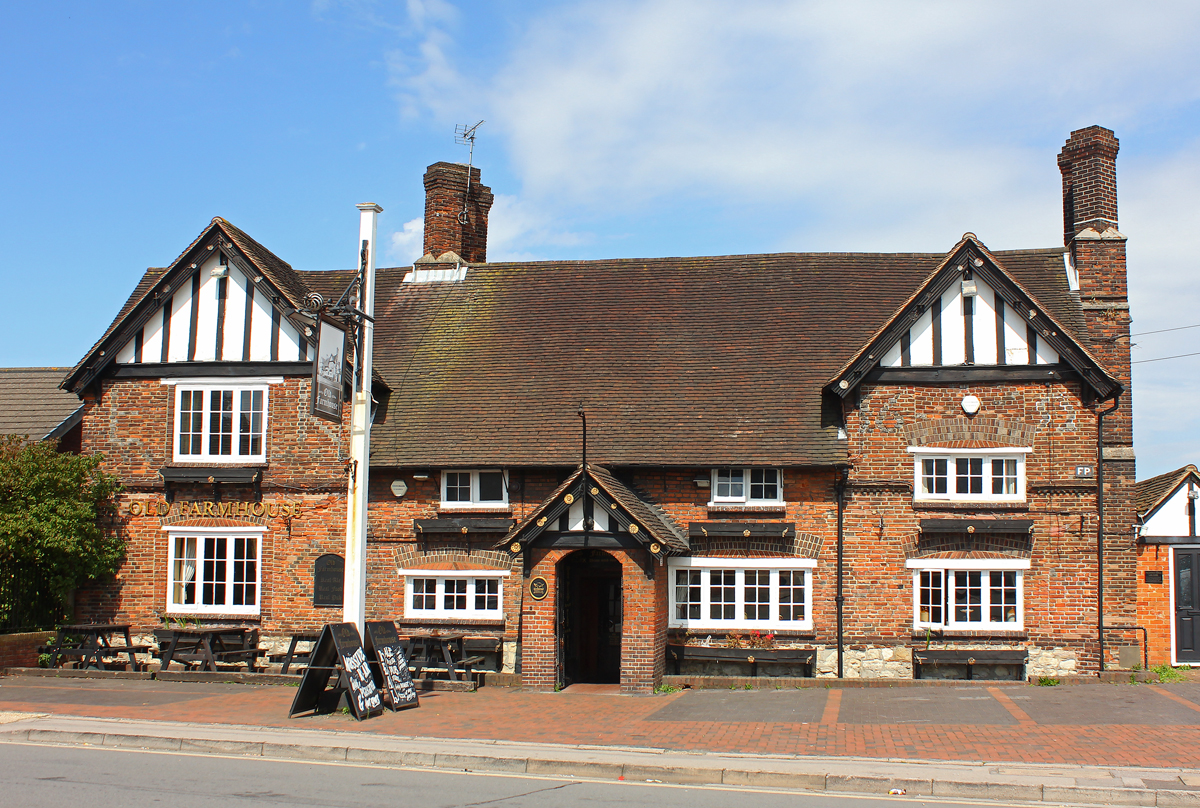
- The Old Farmhouse pub in Southampton

- Location within Southampton
- 50°54′53″N 1°23′33″W
- Type: Public House
- Location: Mount Pleasant Road, Southampton
- OS grid reference: SU 42806 12986

History
- Built: Bef 1560; Rebuilt 1611

Site notes
- Area: Hampshire

Listed Building – Grade II*
- Official name: The Old Farm House Public House
- Designated: 14 July 1953
- Reference no.: 1302207

The Old Farmhouse is a Grade II* listed pub which was originally a farmhouse, and dates back to at least 1560. It was rebuilt in 1611 and converted to its current usage in 1843. It is claimed to be the oldest building which is now a pub with a beer garden in Southampton, Hampshire. It is situated adjacent to the Mount Pleasant level crossing on the South West Main Line.

== History ==
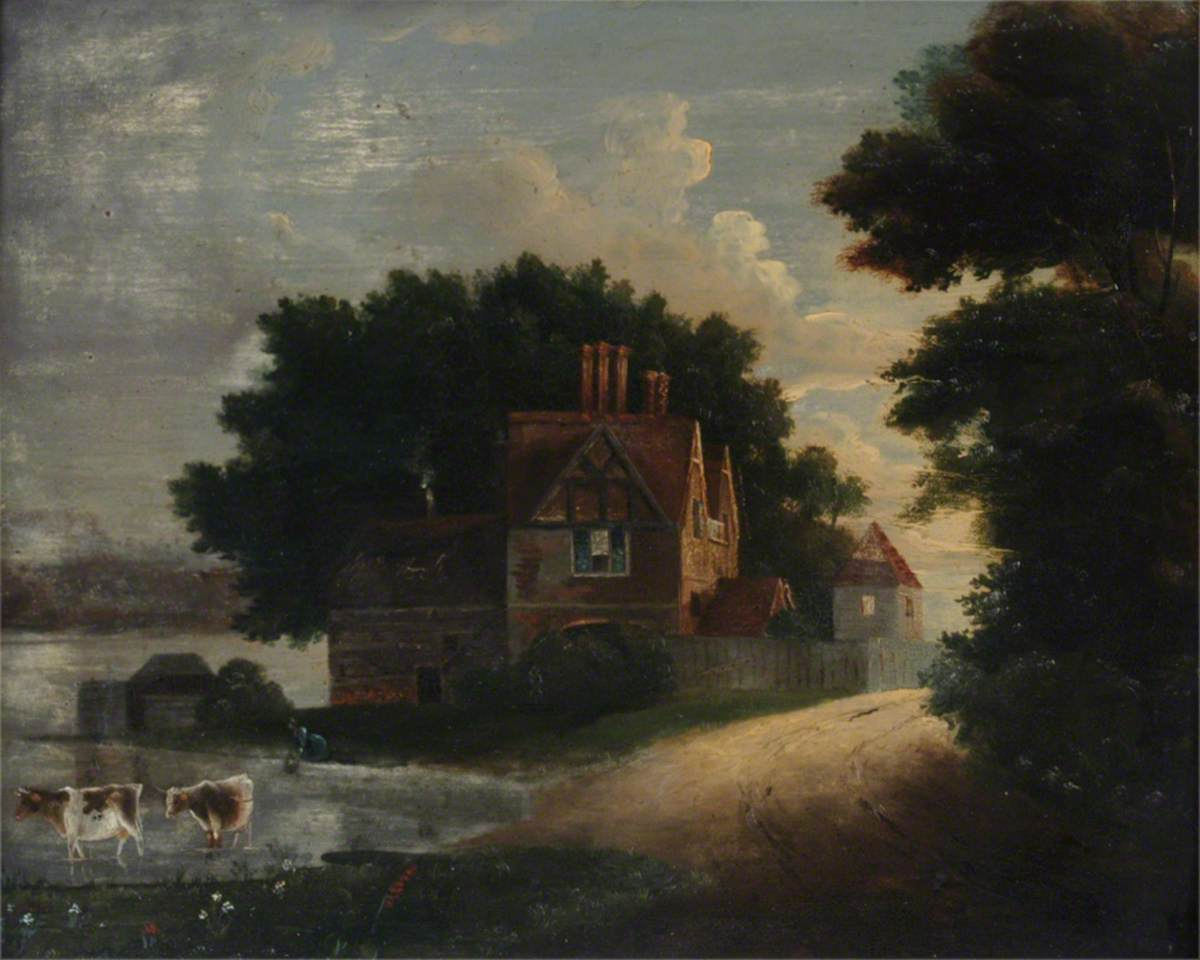
Oil painting of the farmhouse in 1830

The farmhouse, shown on the 1560 map of Southampton, was rebuilt in 1611, a date depicted in white bricks on the south wall, by an unknown person referred to in the surviving records as E.R.

Panton's Wareham Brewery took out a 1000-year lease on the property and opened a beer house here with Mrs. Annette Eddy listed as landlady in 1852. Scrase's Star Brewery took over the lease in 1892 followed later by Strong's Romsey Brewery.

In 1941 a land mine exploded in nearby Derby Road which caused most of the roof tiles to fall off of the building. The tiles were collected and piled up in front of the pub before the roof was repaired.

On 12 March 2019, the pub was voluntarily closed after a report by the Food Standards Agency gave it a food hygiene rating of 0 out of 5. The report found rat droppings behind the ice machine and the building was not ‘structurally sound’.

In July 2021, a revamp was underway ahead of a potential reopening in August 2021. However, as of December 2023, the pub remained closed with the car park and gardens being used as overflow parking for a local car dealer; that month, national conservation group Save Britain's Heritage named the Old Farmhouse their "Building of the Month".

== Local legends ==
The pub is reportedly haunted by the ghost of the daughter of an Irish family who got pregnant out-of-wedlock while living here. Former Landlord Barrie Short (now deceased) stated that although he didn't believe in the legend he had noticed that for a couple of days after he goes into the attic the jukebox will start playing strange music and the television will switch channels by itself. A skull, alleged to have been that of the girl, was unearthed in the cellar and used to be displayed behind the bar.

Other unconfirmed local legends state that Oliver Cromwell stayed at the farmhouse on one or two occasions and that smugglers' tunnels run from the fireplace to the nearby River Itchen.
