= Canute's Palace =

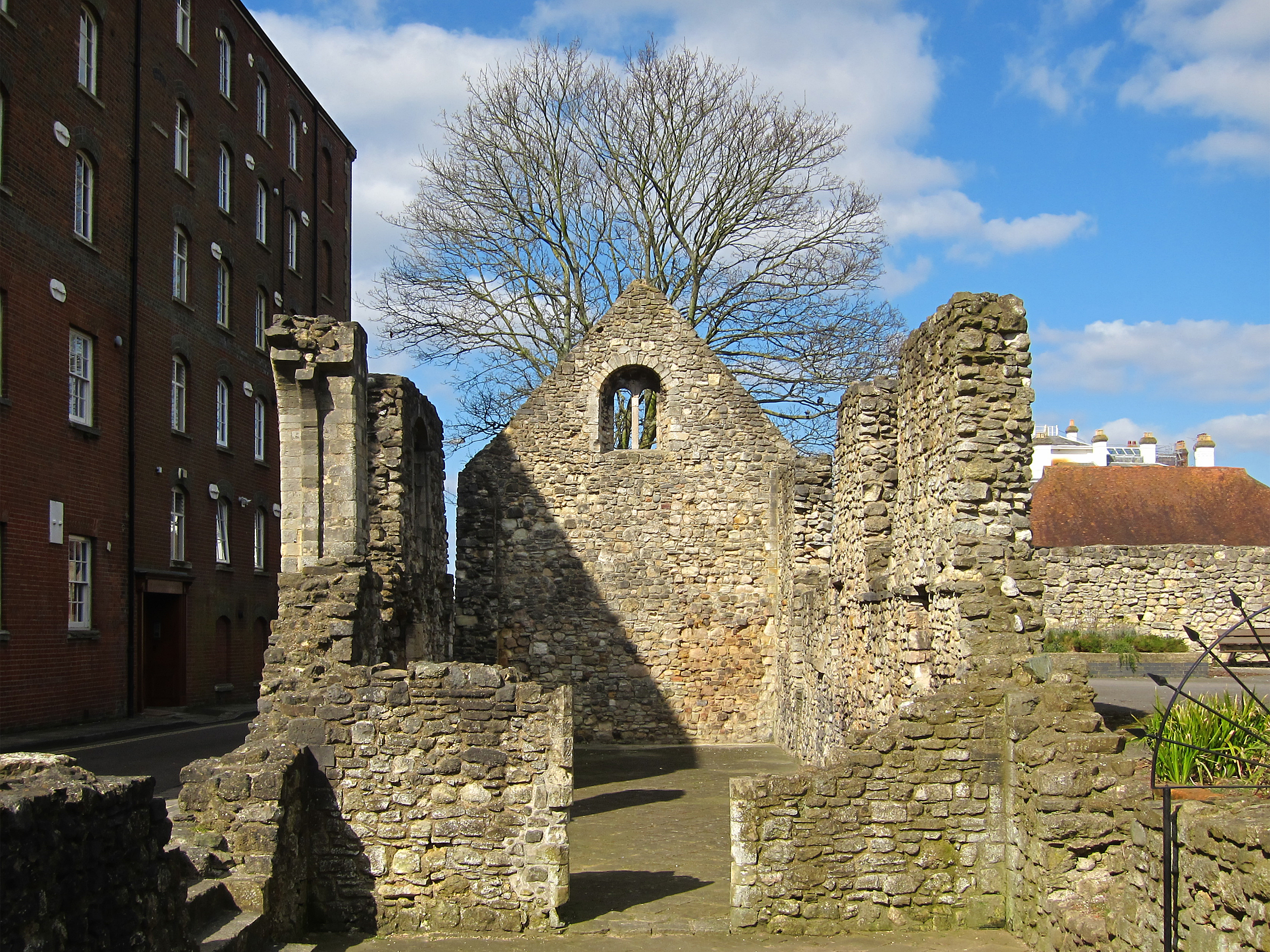

- Location within Southampton
- 50°53′49.2″N 1°24′17.6″W
- Location: Porters Lane, Southampton City Centre
- OS grid reference: SU4194811002

History
- Built: Between 1170 and 1200

Site notes
- Elevation: 5 metres (16 ft)

Scheduled monument
- Reference no.: 1001935

Listed Building – Grade I
- Designated: 14 July 1953
- Reference no.: 1340013

Canute's Palace in Southampton, England, is the name given to the ruins of a Norman merchant's house dating from the late twelfth century. Despite its name, the building has no connection with Canute the Great, nor was it a palace.

== Name ==
The antiquarian, Sir Henry Englefield suggested that the building had been a palace of Canute the Great, but in fact the house is unconnected with him. In April 1801, Englefield presented a very detailed paper to The Society of Antiquaries of London describing the building, in which he said:

Perhaps I indulge but a fond conjecture, when I consider it possibly the hall from which Canute, surrounded by his courtiers, viewed the rising tide; and from whence he descended to the beach, according to that most interesting narrative of our old historians, to repress by a striking and impressive lesson, their impious flattery.

In 1833, the building was described in The Gentleman's Magazine in which the author, "An Architectural Antiquary", says: "The remains of a very magnificent Norman mansion, improperly called Canute's Palace at Southampton, furnishes the best examples of the elliptical arch with which I am acquainted".

== Description ==
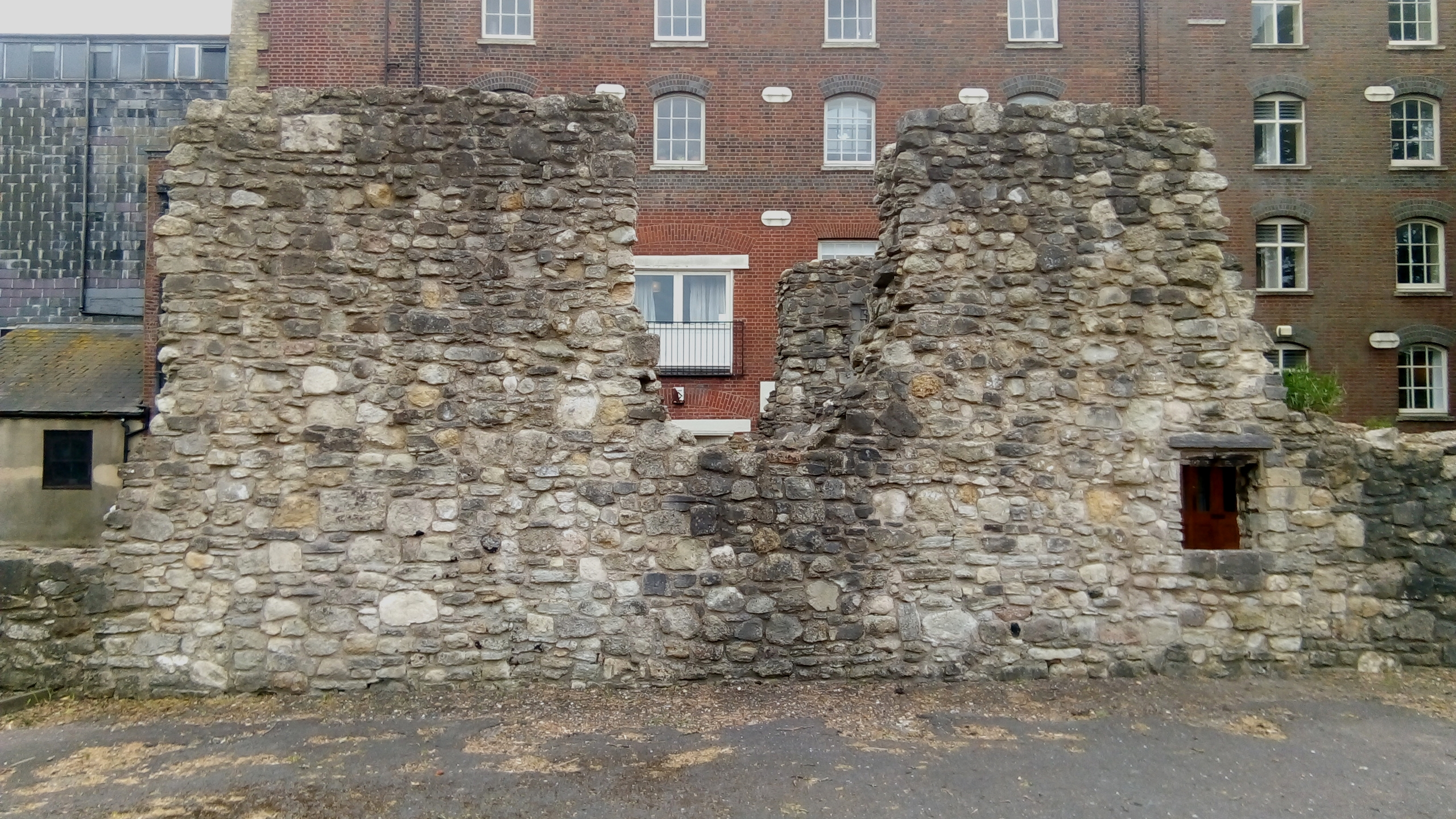
Northern wall of the building

Formerly known as the 'Long House', the building was constructed between 1170 and 1200 with walls of uncoursed rubble, and faced the waterfront before the southern section of the town walls was built. The house had two storeys and was built in the hall house style; the room at the eastern end of the upper storey may have been the merchant's counting house. The remains include a window with two round heads which is not original but was added later in the Norman period. Although the gable at the western end is at full height, it has been mostly reconstructed. The gable has a further round-headed window.

The building was damaged during World War 2.

Canute's Palace is a scheduled monument and a Grade I listed building, having obtained the latter status on 14 July 1953. The building is now part of Town Quay Park, which includes the remains of many historical properties in the southern section of the city.
