= Grade II listed buildings in Southampton: M–O =

In total there are 317 listed buildings in the city of Southampton, of which 14 are Grade I, 20 are Grade II* and the remainder Grade II.

In England, a building or structure is defined as "listed" when it is placed on a statutory register of buildings of "special architectural or historic interest" by the Secretary of State for Culture, Media and Sport, a Government department, in accordance with the Planning (Listed Buildings and Conservation Areas) Act 1990. Historic England, a non-departmental public body, acts as an agency of this department to administer the process and advise the department on relevant issues. There are three grades of listing status. The Grade II designation is the lowest, and is used for "nationally important buildings of special interest". Grade II* is used for "particularly important buildings of more than special interest", while Grade I (defined as being of "exceptional interest" and greater than national importance), is the highest of the three grades.

This list summarises 34 Grade II-listed buildings and structures whose names begin with M to O. Numbered buildings with no individual name are listed by the name of the street on which they stand.

== Listed buildings ==
Name	Photograph	Date	Location^{[A]}	Description^{[B]}	Link to Historic England database^{[C]}	Link to British Listed Buildings database^{[D]}
Mans Bridge	Mans Bridge	1816	SU4471015519; 50.9374°N 1.3651°W	There has been a bridge over the River Itchen at this location since at least the year 932, when it was referred to as Mannysbrigge in King Athelstan's charter to the prior of St. Swithun's Priory in Winchester. The present bridge was built in 1816 by Hampshire County Council; this bridge was made of stone with a single segmental arch and decorated with a lambswool pattern.		
Marrett horse trough	Marrett horse trough	ca. 1900	SU4177211156; 50.8984°N 1.4074°W	Situated on Town Quay, this is a stone basin on two stone feet which was erected to the memory of the Marrett family whose house stood on the site between 1700 and 1900.		
Marsh Hotel		ca. 1840	SU4295011171; 50.8984°N 1.3906°W	This former public house stands on the corner of Canute Road and Albert Road South and was sited opposite the entrance to the Woolston Floating Bridge. The central part of the building is four storeys high built of red brick with a diaper pattern of blue brick. The hip roof is concealed by a parapet with bracket cornice. On the third floor, there is a triple sash window; below this is a further bracketed cornice. The second floor window is a larger copy of that on the upper floor while that on the first floor is smaller. The corners of the building are decorated with long and short quoins. Above the central section of the ground floor, there is a band of decorated strapwork with a central panel on which there was the name of the hotel. Either side of the ground floor there are single storey curved wings. The bar front spreads across the whole of the ground floor with ten round-headed arches containing doors and windows. The hotel is now dwarfed by the nearby Itchen Bridge.		
Mayfield Park – Fox's Monument	Fox's Monument	1810	SU4484310517; 50.8924°N 1.3638°W	Originally erected on his Weston Grove estate by William Chamberlayne (1760–1829), who was Member of Parliament for Southampton, to commemorate his close friend, the Whig politician Charles James Fox (1749–1806). The monument comprises a tall plain stone obelisk on a square base with three steps, inscribed "The earth is the Lord's and the fulness thereof".(Psalm 24)		
Mayfield Park gate piers		1856	SU4512610663; 50.8937°N 1.3597°W	These four rusticated stone gate piers stood at the entrance of Mayfield House, which was built in 1856 for Robert Wright. The estate was acquired by Southampton Corporation in 1937 and the house was demolished in 1956.		
Mayfield Park Lodge House		ca. 1860	SU4511210653; 50.8936°N 1.3599°W	The former lodge to Mayfield House is a one-storey yellow brick building. The main, north-eastern, facade has two gables with quatrefoil ornaments. Under each gable is a three-light castellated bay window with decorative glazing. The central doorcase has two slender iron columns supporting a castellated entablature. The corners of the building are decorated with long and short quoins.		
Mayflower Theatre	Mayflower Theatre	1928	SU4156312291; 50.9086°N 1.4102°W	Originally built as the Empire Variety Theatre, this subsequently became the Gaumont Cinema, before being restored in 1987 as the Mayflower Theatre. Designed by W. and T. R. Milburn in the neo-Grecian style, it is the largest theatre in the south of England. The front elevation is five storeys high and built of stone, with brick infill. On each side there is a half-octagonal stone turret between which is a modillion cornice. On each of the top three floors there are five metal casement windows separated by stone pilasters; at the second floor windows, there are stone balconies. The five first floor windows have deep architraves with interlocking circles and glyphs. The ground floor has a Vitruvian scroll frieze and four square piers with the same pattern as the first-floor windows. The five theatre entrances each have double mahogany doors with brass fittings above small flights of steps. To the right of the building is a brick built four-storeyed later extension which has three windows at each floor, with a balconette at the centre of the second floor, and an arched carriage entrance. Internally, the theatre is heavily decorated in the neo-Grecian style.		
Midland Bank, High Street	Midland Bank	1900	SU4198611504; 50.9015°N 1.4043°W	Designed by Thomas Bostock Whinney in the neo-Baroque style, this bank, now a branch of H.S.B.C., stands between Castle Lane and Albion Place. The building is three storeys high with a hipped roof. On the Albion place elevation, there are six dormer windows with curved pediments, with three on the High street elevation. On the High Street, there is an elaborate balustrade at roof level between two corner cupolas with eight Doric columns and four pediments. Below the upper floor, there is a modillion cornice; the first floor windows (three on the High Street and six on Albion Place) have Gibbs surrounds and blank keystones. The corner window is more elaborate with a curved pediment. The ground floor windows, separated by tall engaged Roman Doric columns, are rusticated round-headed arches with grotesque masks to the keystones. The main door is on the corner with an oculus above and an open curved pediment supported by putti. The keystone is an elaborate blank shield.		
369 & 371 Millbrook Road West		early to mid-19th century	SU3932312828; 50.9136°N 1.4420°W	Previously known as "Baronald" and "Belvedere Villa", this is a two-storey yellow brick house. It has a hipped slate roof and a moulded eaves cornice. On the Millbrook Road elevation, there are two two-light bay windows and a central window. The central door is under a later bracketed canopy. On the western elevation, the doorcase is under a fluted Doric portico. The property has previously been used as offices but is currently converted into apartments.		
2 New Road		pre-1825	SU4219512119; 50.9070°N 1.4011°W	On the corner of Palmerston Road, opposite Palmerston Park, this is part of a group of five Regency-style houses. Originally known as "Osborne House", it was occupied by Edwin Jones, a local shopkeeper, from 1890 until about 1927, after which it became a boarding house. In 1960, it became "New Australia House", as offices of an insurance company; it is currently occupied by estate agents. The building is three storeys high, with a yellow brick cornice concealing the roof. On the Palmerston Road elevation, there are two full-height semi-circular bows, with a single window at each floor. On New Road, a similar pair of bows extend up to the first floor only. The adjacent property, No.4 New Road, was originally the stables to No. 2, and was later used as a cycle-maker’s, until 1946, after which it became a saw works.		
The Old Bond Store	The Old Bond Store	mid to late 19th century	SU4216011462; 50.9011°N 1.4018°W	Situated on the Back of the Walls, to the east of the old town, this was originally a bonded warehouse. Built of red brick, it has two gable ends with wooden bargeboards. On the corners are black long and short quoins. On the front of the building, there is a central round-headed unloading door with the initials "D.W.W." near the keystone; beneath that there is a round-headed arched opening with studded wooden door; "Old Bond Store" is painted on the keystone. There are also two cambered windows on the first floor with wooden grilles and a further plain window on the ground floor. On the northern side, there are five grilled windows and the outline of a round-headed arch, now filled in. Southampton City Council's survey of historic buildings says "The Old Bond Store is of architectural merit with its strong rusticated quoins brought out in a dark grey (engineering type) brick. The gable makes a significant contribution to what is extremely fragmented townscape and provides a remnant survival of the scale and character of these former lanes." "This building is considered to have strong cultural, illustrative and aesthetic values as it represents a lost building type for Southampton where such stores were once commonplace."		
Old Cemetery – Allen Memorial	Allen Memorial	ca. 1900	SU4134413556; 50.91995°N 1.4132°W	The mausoleum is described as "a well-executed example of Neo-classical design". It was built to house the coffin of Richard Nicholas (died 1901), his mother, Araline Gamlen Nicholas (died 1910) and his sister, Araline Allen (died 1928). The pedimented front has the cross of St. John in the tympanum, below which is a plain cornice and an inscribed frieze, supported by two Ionic columns. The frieze bears the inscription; "I am the Resurrection and the Life . . ."(John 11) The doorway is a rounded arch bearing a carved head (now badly worn) with the spandrels decorated with angels, one with a trumpet and the other a crown of life.		
Old Cemetery – Church of England chapel	Southampton Old Cemetery Chapel	1845	SU4132313563; 50.9201°N 1.4135°W	The Church of England mortuary chapel was designed by Frederick John Francis in the Norman style and was built by local builder, John Foot. The chapel has a semi-circular apsidal western end and a small bellcote above the eastern end. It is now used as an artwork design studios.		
Old Cemetery – gate piers to eastern gate	Old Cemetery - gate piers	ca. 1880	SU4149313733; 50.9216°N 1.4110°W	The eastern gates are part of the third phase extension of the cemetery in the early 1880s although the gates are modern replacements. The gate piers are in a Gothic Revival style, of square-on-plan ashlar, set on a stone base with snecked panels of roughly dressed stone and a blind trefoil decoration at the midpoint in the front elevation. They are capped with trefoil gablets, mirroring the blind trefoil on the main body of the pier.		
Old Cemetery – gate piers to north-western gate	Old Cemetery - gate piers	1846	SU4127013949; 50.9235°N 1.4142°W	The gate piers at the north west end of the cemetery are in is medieval Gothic style being square-on-plan ashlar, set on a moulded stone base with snecked panels of roughly dressed stone and chamfered at the shoulder. Each pier has an octagonal top with armorial decoration displaying a shield emblazoned with a cross, surmounted by an octagonal moulded cap. The cap to the right pier is missing. The gates are 20th-century replacements.		
Old Cemetery – Jewish Chapel	Jewish Chapel	1845	SU4135913617; 50.9205°N 1.4130°W	The Jewish mortuary chapel was designed by Frederick Francis in the Gothic Revival style and was built by local builder, John Foot. The chapel is the smallest of the three in the cemetery and has gable ends with quatrefoil windows and two pairs of double lancet windows. It is now used as a privately owned house.		
Old Cemetery – Lodge	Old Cemetery Lodge	1848	SU4135813604; 50.9204°N 1.4130°W	The cemetery lodge was designed by Frederick Francis in the Tudor style and was built by local builder, John Foot. The two-storey house has two gables to the north-west elevation and one to the south-east. The north-west elevation has oriel windows on the first floor, while the south-east elevation has mullioned and transomed windows. It is now occupied as a private house.		
Old Cemetery – Main gates and gate piers	Old Cemetery Main gates	1845	SU4136813593; 50.9203°N 1.4128°W	The main gate piers to the cemetery were built at the same time as the three chapels and the lodge. They were designed by Frederick Francis with the gates fabricated by Edward Barwell from Northampton. There are two square piers with octagonal turrets surmounted by an archway with drip moulding, corbel heads and a stepped parapet with a shield bearing the municipal arms of Southampton.		
Old Cemetery – Non-conformist Chapel	Nonconformist Chapel	1845	SU4130413638; 50.9207°N 1.4137°W	The Non-conformist mortuary chapel was designed by Frederick Francis in the Early English style and was built by local builder, John Foot. The chapel comprises a four-bay nave with buttresses and has an arched doorcase in the south-western front. It is now used as a charity’s storage area.		
Old Cemetery – Pearce Memorial	Pearce Memorial	1861	SU4131713539; 50.9198°N 1.41353°W	The 3-metre-tall (9.8 ft) marble memorial represents the three virtues, Faith, Hope and Charity, standing back to back, attached by their wings, and carrying a large draped urn above their heads. It was sculpted by Richard Cockle Lucas as a memorial to the banker, Robert Pearce (died 1861), and his family.		
Old Cemetery – wall fronting Hill Lane	Old Cemetery wall	mid-19th century	SU4120013599; 50.9204°N 1.4152°W	The wall on the western edge of the cemetery, fronting Hill Lane, runs for approximately 500 metres. It is described as "coursed rubble about 5 ft in height with red brick coping and piers at regular intervals" and was built by Arthur Few.		
Old County Court	Old County Court	1851–1853	SU4192011488; 50.9014°N 1.4052°W	The former County Court in Castle Lane was built in a "solid Italianate style" unlike the more restrained Lansdowne House opposite. Described as "rather overpowering in the narrow street", it comprises a large two-storeyed central section with two single storey wings, all built in yellow brick with rusticated stucco quoins and cornice. At the centre is a recessed arch with stucco voussoirs; in the arch is the Royal Coat of Arms. At the top of the ground floor level, there is a cornice which carries across the arch. The central doorway has a double keystone and stands on a flight of steps. The left wing has two windows and a rusticated arched doorcase while that on the right has a plainer doorcase and an arched central window. The door to the left has the words "Public Entrance" carved into a panel on the cornice. The sides of the central building have arched windows at first floor level with the ground floor being obscured by various later additions.		
Old Post Office	Old Post Office	1892	SU4203911207; 50.8988°N 1.4036°W	The town’s former Post Office at 57 High Street was opened on 5 November 1892 to replace an earlier office which had been occupied since 1861. The new building was built in the Flemish style of red brick with terracotta dressings. It is three storeys high surmounted by three elaborate pediments. Below the pediments is a modillion cornice with a frieze. The building has five mullioned and transomed casement windows on the second and first floors. On the ground floor, there are four round-headed windows with a projecting pedimented porch supported on console brackets to the left. In the pediment, there is a moulded crown. Beneath the building is a 14th-century vault, which is a scheduled monument. The upper floors have been converted into apartments. Planning permission has been granted to convert the ground floor into a restaurant.		
2 to 8 Old Redbridge Road	2 to 8 Old Redbridge Road	18th century	SU3728713675; 50.9213°N 1.4709°W	This is a range of four two-storeyed houses, all of which are different. No. 2 (The Nook) at the right hand end is brick-built, painted white and has a pair of casement windows on each floor with cambered stone heads and keystones (the door is on the end elevation). No. 4 (Hazeldene) is similar but with the door to the left under a bracketed hood. No. 6 (The Cottage) is built of grey brick with red brick dressings and is hidden behind a yew hedge. This has a single dormer window, three sash windows on the first floor and two on the ground, with the door under a bracketed hood to the left. No. 8 (Mee’s House) is the largest and is built of red brick. It has two dormer windows and three sash windows. On the ground floor, there are two windows with the door to the right under a later Tuscan porch. All four properties have been much extended to the rear.		
Ivy House, 45 Old Redbridge Road	Ivy House, Old Redbridge Road	17th century	SU3714213653; 50.9211°N 1.4729°W	This is an L-shaped house dating from the 17th century although the front is mid-18th-century. It is built of brick painted white. The front elevation has three sash windows on the first floor and two on the ground with cambered heads. The door is under a hood supported by curved brackets and engaged columns. The left side has one sash window at each floor. To the right, there is a later canted full height bay window. the house has been much extended to the rear. In 2001, while the house was being renovated and new homes built in the garden, archaeologists from Southampton City Council excavated the grounds of the house. They discovered flint tools from the Palaeolithic, Mesolithic and Neolithic periods indicating that the area had been settled over a period of several thousand years. They also discovered the remains of a timber building from the high Medieval period (about 1250 to 1350).		
The Chestnuts, Old Redbridge Road		early to mid-19th century	SU3725313644; 50.9211°N 1.4714°W	Standing on the corner of Tate Road, this is a two-storeyed red brick building under a hipped slate roof. The main (Tate Road) elevation has three sash windows on the first floor, the outer ones of which are shuttered. The main entrance door is central with glazed side lights, pilasters and cornice on consoles. On Redbridge Road, there were originally two windows on each floor, but those on the right are now blank.		
Ordnance Survey buildings	Ordnance Survey buildings	1841–1867	SU4203412808; 50.9131°N 1.4032°W	The former offices of the Ordnance Survey, most of these buildings were designed by Major General Sir Henry James, the Director-General. The buildings, all built in yellow brick, comprise the "Western Range", a long two-storeyed block with the date 1867 in a keystone, the "Barrack Block" which has a round-headed carriage entrance with keystones surmounted by the Royal Crest, the former "Staff Quarters", a two-storeyed building in four sections, having seven windows in all at each level, some of which are blank (the date 1868 is engraved on one of the keystones) and a square building adjoining the modern court complex. This has a hipped roof and three windows at each floor; those on the ground floor have stuccoed fan mouldings echoing those on Avenue House. This building is all that remains of the original main building which was severely damaged in the blitz and later demolished.		
Ordnance Survey buildings – gates and gate piers	Ordnance Survey buildings - gates and gate piers	early 19th century	SU4206812790; 50.9133°N 1.4031°W	Two brick square gate piers with stone caps, with a cast iron gate eight feet high with two cast iron pillars. The gates were made by W. and J. Lankester.		
10 to 17 Oxford Street		early 19th century	SU4235311187; 50.8986°N 1.3991°W	This is a terrace of eight three-storeyed white stuccoed houses. They have a cornice and blocking course with a stringcourse over the ground floor. Each property has a single window at each floor, some with cast iron balconies, and a round-headed doorcase.		
18 to 24 Oxford Street		early 19th century	SU4238111159; 50.8984°N 1.3987°W	This is a terrace of eight properties with three storeys and an attic. They are faced with white stucco with a rusticated ground floor. On the first floor, they have a semi-circular three-light bay window, one of which has a balcony over. Several of the properties are occupied as offices with those at the eastern end having 19th century shop fronts.		
44 Oxford Street		early 19th century	SU4243611113; 50.8979°N 1.3979°W	This is a three-storeyed painted brick building with a sash window on the second floor and a cantilevered bow window on the first floor. The shop front is late 19th century. The property is occupied by a takeaway food business.		
45 to 47 Oxford Street		early 19th century	SU4242511115; 50.8980°N 1.3981°W	This is a terrace of three properties, each of which is three-storeyed and built of painted brick. Each property has one sash window at the second and first floors with a late 19th-century shop front. They were listed for their group value with those on either side.		
48 & 49 Oxford Street		early 19th century	SU4241111119; 50.8980°N 1.3983°W	This building stands on the corner of Latimer Street and is three-storeyed faced in stucco. No. 49 has a cantilevered bow window on the first floor but on No. 48 this has been replaced by a square bay window. There is a further cantilevered bow window on the Latimer Street facade. On the corner there are Ionic end pilasters and decorative mouldings. The shop front is modern. The property is occupied by an Indian restaurant.		
61 Oxford Street		1830–1840	SU4232611171; 50.8985°N 1.3995°W	This is a three-storeyed neo-classical townhouse of the 1830s which retains many original internal features. It was at one time the home of Lucia Foster Welch, the first Lady Mayor of Southampton. The main facade has a triple round-headed casement window on the second floor while on the first floor there is a large sash window set within a recessed arch with a stuccoed wreath motif in the tympanum. The canted bay window to the ground floor is a later addition. To the left is a two-storeyed entrance bay with a pedimented entrance framed by pilasters. To the rear of the property is a two-storey cantilevered bow carried on cast-iron columns with decorative spandrels, which retains the original curved sashes.		

== Notes ==
- ^{A} Location is given first as a grid reference, based on the British national grid reference system (or OSGB36) of the Ordnance Survey; and second as World Geodetic System 84 coordinates, used by the Global Positioning System.
- ^{B} Unless otherwise stated, the descriptions are based on those on the Historic England database.
- ^{C} The Historic England database is the official listing and includes a description of the property, the reasons for designation, the date of listing and an extract from the Ordnance Survey map at a scale of 1:2500 pinpointing the exact location of the building.
- ^{D} The British Listed Buildings database also includes the details of the property from the Historic England database, together with links to Google/street view, Ordnance Survey and Bing maps/birds eye view.

== Sources ==
- Southampton City Council: Historic Environment Record – Listed Buildings in Southampton
- British Listed Buildings – Listed Buildings in Southampton
