= Grade II listed buildings in Southampton: S =

In total there are 317 listed buildings in the city of Southampton, of which 14 are Grade I, 20 are Grade II* and the remainder Grade II.

In England, a building or structure is defined as "listed" when it is placed on a statutory register of buildings of "special architectural or historic interest" by the Secretary of State for Culture, Media and Sport, a Government department, in accordance with the Planning (Listed Buildings and Conservation Areas) Act 1990. English Heritage, a non-departmental public body, acts as an agency of this department to administer the process and advise the department on relevant issues. There are three grades of listing status. The Grade II designation is the lowest, and is used for "nationally important buildings of special interest". Grade II* is used for "particularly important buildings of more than special interest", while Grade I (defined as being of "exceptional interest" and greater than national importance), is the highest of the three grades.

This list summarises 41 Grade II-listed buildings and structures whose names begin with S. Numbered buildings with no individual name are listed by the name of the street on which they stand.

== Listed buildings ==
Name	Photograph	Date	Location^{[A]}	Description^{[B]}	Link to English Heritage database^{[C]}	Link to Images of England database^{[D]}	Link to British Listed Buildings database^{[E]}
St. Alban's Church	St. Alban's Church	1933	SU4314015688; 50.9390°N 1.3874°W	Designed by Welch, Cachemaille-Day and Lander, this Anglican church has a Latin Cross plan and is late Gothic in style. The traditional outward appearance of the Church hides an internal layout that was innovative at the time of construction. The east end of the Church which would normally have formed the Chancel was used as a Lady Chapel, while the Main Altar was sited under the central tower much closer to the congregation.			
Former St. Augustine's Church		1881	SU4304112547; 50.9108°N 1.3892°W				
St. Christopher's Mission Hall	St. Christopher's Mission Hall	late 18th to early 19th century	SU4291616318; 50.9447°N 1.3905°W				
St. Denys Church	St. Denys Church	1868	SU4345114096; 50.9247°N 1.3831°W				
St. Denys Priory	St. Denys Priory	1338	SU4360314145; 50.9251°N 1.3810°W				
St. Denys railway station	St. Denys railway station	1867	SU4308713784; 50.9219°N 1.3884°W				
St. Edmund's Church	St. Edmund's Church	1889	SU4205613006; 50.9150°N 1.4031°W				
St. James' Church, Shirley	St James' Church, Shirley	1836	SU4028014299; 50.9267°N 1.4282°W				
St. Joseph's Church	St. Joseph's Church	1843–1850	SU4188611250; 50.8992°N 1.4057°W				
St. Julien's Hospital – garden wall		12th and 15th centuries	SU4207410966; 50.8967°N 1.4031°W				
St. Mark's Church, Woolston	St. Mark's Church, Woolston	1863	SU4381310572; 50.8930°N 1.3784°W				
St. Mary Extra Cemetery Chapels		1879	SU4569010850; 50.8953°N 1.3517°W				
St. Mary's churchyard boundary wall		early 18th century	SU4396915453; 50.9369°N 1.3756°W				
St. Mary's Church, Sholing	St. Mary's Church, Sholing	1866	SU4527411283; 50.8993°N 1.3576°W				
St. Mary's College		early 19th century	SU4452213551; 50.9197°N 1.3680°W				
76 St. Mary Street		1884	SU4249711963; 50.9056°N 1.3969°W			Not listed	
153 St. Mary Street	153 St. Mary Street	18th century	SU4255211752; 50.9037°N 1.3962°W				
St. Mary's Church	St Mary's Church, Southampton	1878	SU4262211657; 50.9028°N 1.3952°W				
St. Michael and All Angels Church	St Michael and All Angels	1897	SU4187416301; 50.9446°N 1.4053°W				
St. Michaels Parish Hall		early 19th century	SU4189811316; 50.8998°N 1.4056°W				
Vaults and remains adjoining Nos. 4 and 5 St. Michaels Square		12th century	SU4192011271; 50.8994°N 1.4053°W				
4 St. Michaels Square		14th and 19th centuries	SU4191311272; 50.8994°N 1.4054°W				
5 St. Michaels Square	5 St Michaels Square	16th century	SU4190511273; 50.8994°N 1.4055°W				
No. 8 & vault underneath, St. Michaels Square		early 15th and 19th centuries	SU4188811316; 50.8998°N 1.4057°W				
Gas lamp in St. Michaels Square	Gas lamp in St. Michaels Square	ca. 1821	SU4188511293; 50.8996°N 1.4057°W			Not listed	
Vault below No. 11 St. Michaels Square		late 14th century	SU4190411316; 50.8998°N 1.4055°W				
Vaults below Nos. 15 & 16 St. Michaels Square		mediaeval	SU4192511315; 50.8998°N 1.4052°W				
5 St. Michaels Street	5 St. Michaels Street	mid 19th century	SU4198011275; 50.8994°N 1.4044°W				
6 & 8 St. Michaels Street	6 and 8 St Michaels Street	ca. 1870s	SU4199911274; 50.8994°N 1.4040°W			Not listed	
Former St. Peter's Church	Former St. Peter's Church	1845	SU4152512346; 50.9091°N 1.4107°W				
Seaway House	Seaway House	ca. 1860	SU4195710981; 50.8968°N 1.4048°W				
Ship Inn		16th or 17th century	SU3716913644; 50.9211°N 1.4726°W				
Shirley Precinct drinking fountain	Shirley Precinct drinking fountain	1887	SU3982213933; 50.9235°N 1.4348°W				
350 Shirley Road		ca. 1840	SU4028213320; 50.9179°N 1.4283°W				
Singh Sabha Gurdwara (formerly St. Luke's Church)	Singh Sabha Gurdwara	1852	SU4240012886; 50.9139°N 1.3982°W	Built in a neo-Gothic style by architect John Elliott of Chichester. It was enlarged in 1860 and a chancel was added in 1873 by James Piers St Aubyn. In 1983 the church was sold and converted into a Sikh temple.			
South Western House	South Western House	1872	SU4250911032; 50.8972°N 1.3969°W				
Stella memorial	Stella memorial	ca. 1900	SU4178511129; 50.8981°N 1.4072°W	Situated on Town Quay, this is a memorial to Mary Ann Rogers, a stewardess on the SS Stella, sailing from Southampton to Guernsey when it sank on the night of 30 March 1899. She gave up her lifejacket and her place in a lifeboat so that passengers could be saved. It is a stone hexagonal structure supported on six columns with round-headed arches. It has a cornice decorated with Tudor roses and a stepped roof surmounted by a ball finial. The drinking fountain is in a central thicker column having an integral bowl with guilloche moulding.			
The Sun Buildings	The Sun Buildings	mid 19th century	SU4193211941; 50.9054°N 1.4050°W				
Supermarine Slipway		1936–1937	SU4347611281; 50.8994°N 1.3831°W			Not listed	Not listed
Swaythling railway station	Swaythling railway station	1883	SU4392315929; 50.9411°N 1.3762°W	One storey red brick station building with orange brick dressings, built in an elaborate Neo-Flemish style. The left side has a Flemish gable with a central pediment and ball finials and includes a date tablet.			
Swiss Cottage		late 19th century	SU4264213947; 50.9234°N 1.3947°W				

=== Notes ===
- ^{A} Location is given first as a grid reference, based on the British national grid reference system (or OSGB36) of the Ordnance Survey; and second as World Geodetic System 84 coordinates, used by the Global Positioning System.
- ^{B} Unless otherwise stated, the descriptions are based on those on the English Heritage database.
- ^{C} The English Heritage database is the official listing and includes a description of the property, the reasons for designation, the date of listing and an extract from the Ordnance Survey map at a scale of 1:2500 pinpointing the exact location of the building.
- ^{D} The Images of England database includes the details of the property from the English Heritage database with a photograph of the listed building.
- ^{E} The British Listed Buildings database also includes the details of the property from the English Heritage database, together with links to Google/street view, Ordnance Survey and Bing maps/birds eye view.
