= Southampton town walls =

Defensive walls in Southampton, UK

- Hampshire, England
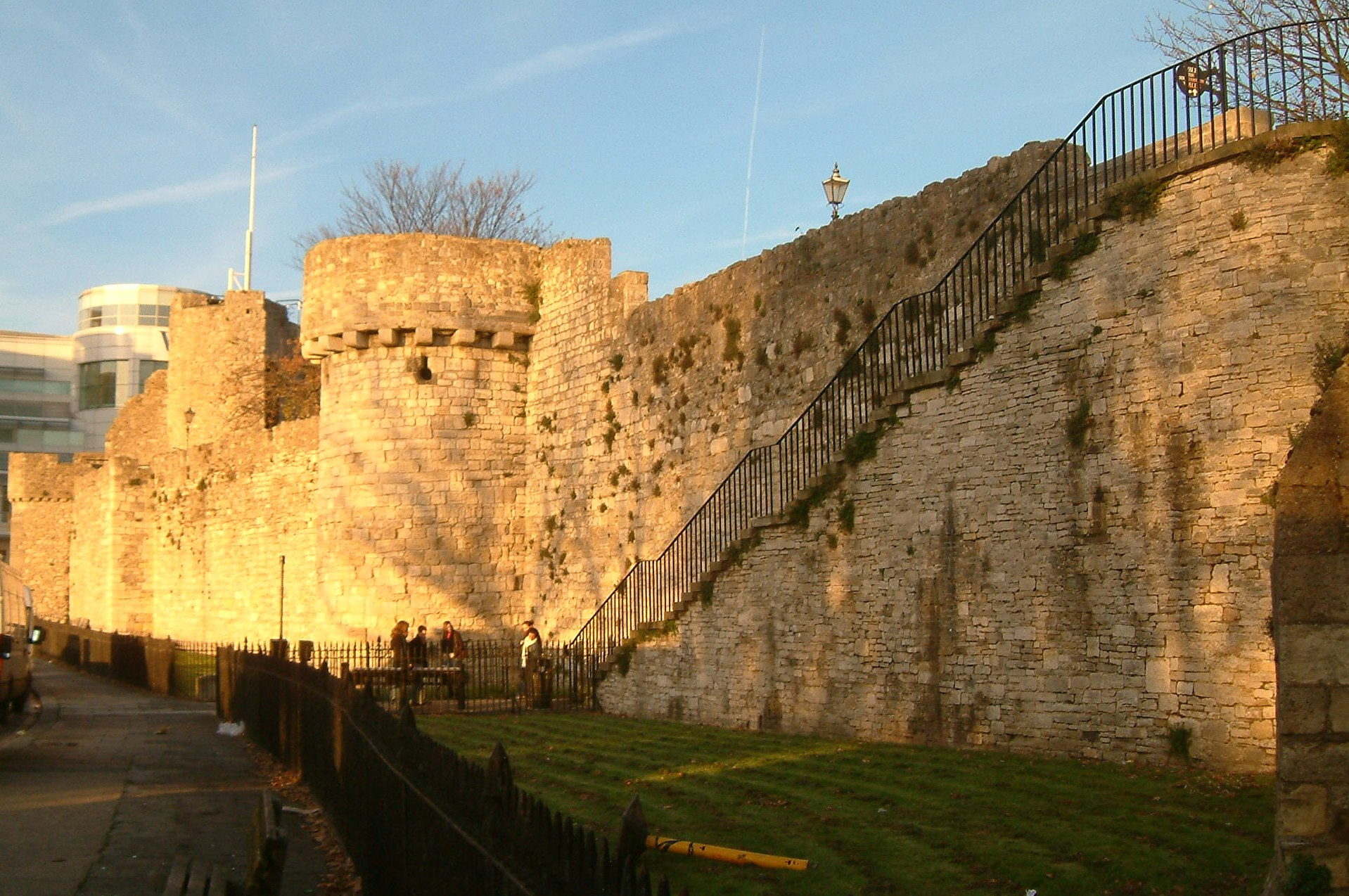
- Southampton town walls

Site information
- Type: City walls
- Condition: Approximately half the medieval circuit remains intact

Location
- Shown within Hampshire
- Coordinates: 50.9007°N 1.4054°W
- Grid reference: grid reference SU41911141

Site history
- Materials: Stone
- Battles/wars: French raid of 1338

Southampton's town walls are a sequence of defensive structures built around the town in southern England. Although earlier Roman and Anglo-Saxon settlements around Southampton had been fortified with walls or ditches, the later walls originate with the move of the town to the current site in the 10th century. This new town was defended by banks, ditches and the natural curve of the river and coastline. The Normans built a castle in Southampton but made no attempts to improve the wider defences of the town until the early 13th century, when Southampton's growing prosperity as a trading centre and conflict with France encouraged the construction of a number of gatehouses and stone walls to the north and east sides of the settlement.

In 1338 Southampton was raided by French forces; the town's defences proved inadequate, particularly along the quays on the west and south of the city. Edward III ordered some immediate improvements to Southampton's town walls but it was not until the 1360s that substantial work began. Over the coming decades the town was entirely enclosed by a 2 km (1.25-mile) long stone wall, with 29 towers and eight gates. With the advent of gunpowder weapons in the 1360s and 1370s, Southampton was one of the first towns in England to install the new technology to existing fortifications and to build new towers specifically to house cannon.

Southampton's town walls remained an important defensive feature during the 15th century, the gatehouses sometimes being used as important civic facilities, including acting as the town's guildhall and housing the town's gaol. From the end of the 17th century their importance steadily declined and the walls were slowly demolished or adapted for other uses throughout the 18th and 19th centuries. This process continued into the early 20th century until, in the post-war years, the walls were recognised as an important historical feature of Southampton. Conservation projects have since occurred and the walls are now promoted as a tourist attraction.

== History ==
=== 1st–10th centuries ===
Several earlier settlements were built near modern Southampton featuring protective town walls. Following the Roman conquest of Britain in AD 43 the fortress settlement of Clausentum was established. It was an important trading port and a defensive outpost for the town of Winchester, located on the site of Bitterne Manor, today a suburb of modern Southampton. Clausentum was defended on its eastern, landwards side by a flint stone wall and two ditches. After the fall of the Roman Empire, in the 7th and 8th centuries the Anglo-Saxons built a planned settlement called Hamwic, close to the current location of Southampton, approximately on the location of the later St Mary's church. At least some parts of this burh town had a ditch dug around it, 3 m (10 feet) wide and 1.5 m (5 feet) deep, and possibly was defended by a bank of earth. In the 10th century, Viking raids prompted the settlement of Southampton to move to its current location.

=== 11th–13th centuries ===
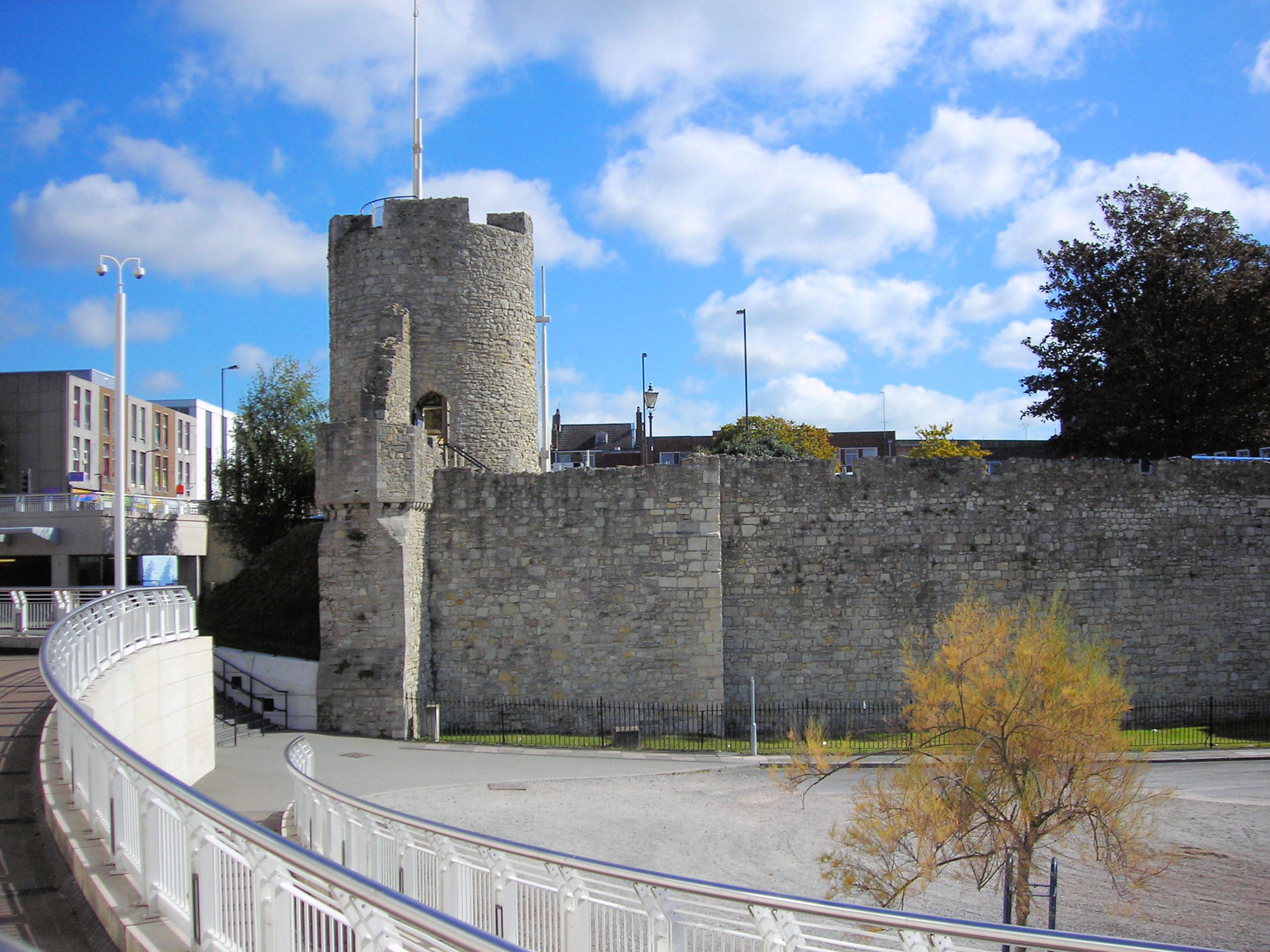
Arundel Tower on the north-east corner of the circuit

By the time that the Normans conquered England in 1066, the town of Southampton occupied a rectangular area overlooking the mouth of the River Test, an important medieval waterway. It was protected by water on most sides and by protective ditches and banks to the north and east. Southampton at this time was a relatively large town, but not as significant as in the later medieval period. The Normans built a castle within the town on the site of a probable large English hall, and considerable damage was caused to the surrounding local buildings as space was opened up for the new fortification.

During the years of the Anarchy, in which the Empress Matilda and Stephen fought for control of England, Southampton was held by William le Gros, the Bishop of Winchester and a supporter of Stephen. When Henry II came to the throne in 1153, he took back Southampton and carried out improvements to the castle, as part of his attempt to improve the general standard of security in the south. By the second half of the 12th century, Southampton was increasingly important for coastal defence and as a base for operations on the continent. Following the threat of French invasion in the 1170s, Henry II invested modest additional resources in the castle, but no efforts were undertaken to improve the town's ditches and banks.

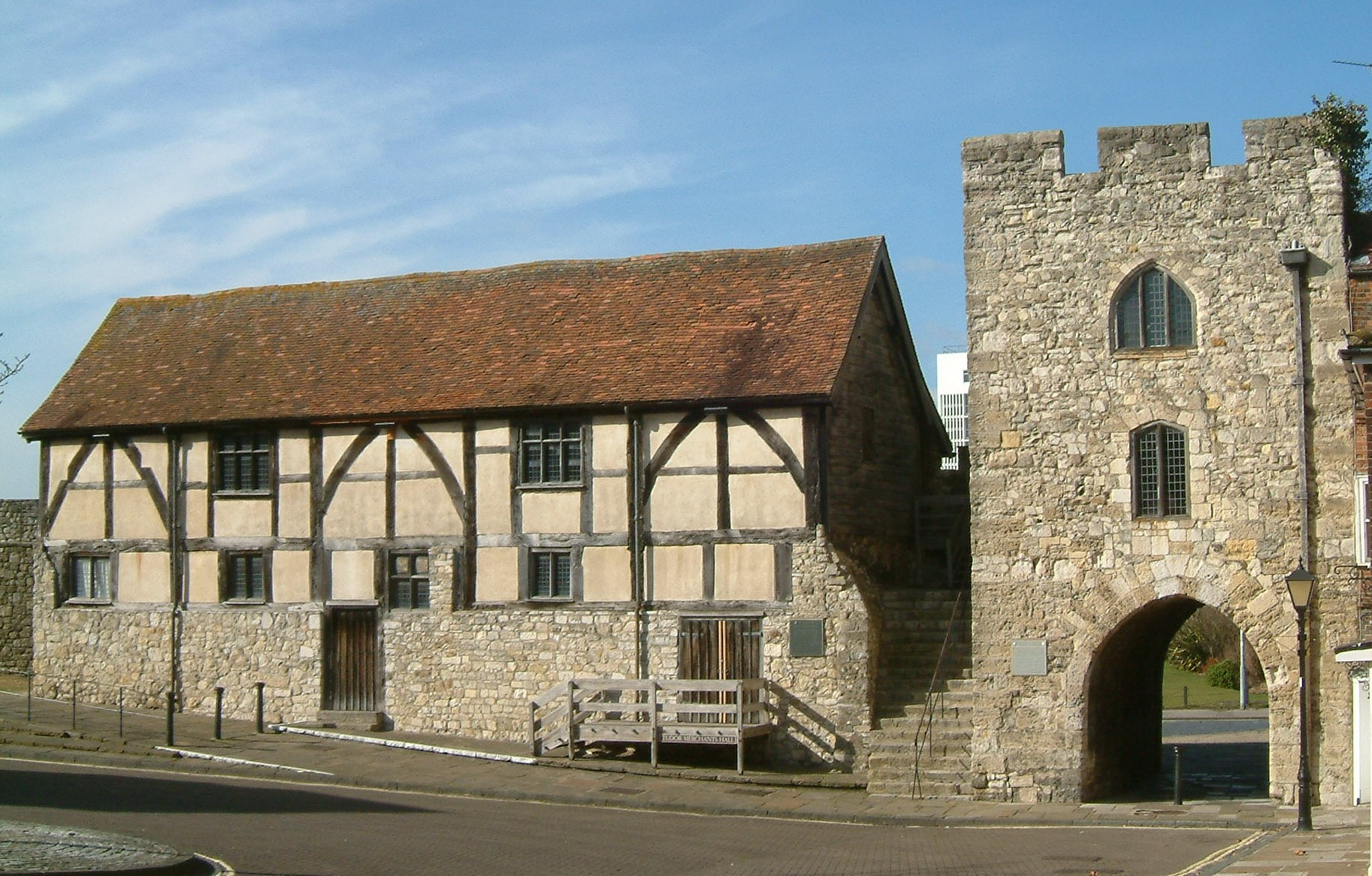
The Tudor Merchants Hall (l) and the West Gate (r) (Note: The name of the Tudor Merchants Hall is misleading, as it in fact dates from around 1400.)

By the 12th century, Southampton was an important trading port with trade routes to Normandy, the Levant and Gascony. Both the town and castle played an important role in this trade, in part forming a warehouse for the king's imports, this process being managed by a Crown Bailiff. The former castle hall was turned into a subterranean vault in the 13th century, probably for storing wine. Stone houses, often combining accommodation and storage facilities, began to be built in Southampton by the wealthiest merchants, particularly in the prosperous western and southern parts of the town, but these properties could not be easily defended against attack.

The English Channel was contested militarily between England and France during the 13th century, and Southampton was both an important base for naval operations and a tempting target for raiders. At the start of the 13th century additional work was therefore conducted to improve the town's defences; the king granted £100 in 1202 and again in 1203 to help develop the earth banks around the town. (Note: It is impossible to accurately compare 12th and 13th century prices with modern equivalents. For comparison, £100 represents the average annual income for a late 12th century baron.) By 1217 East Gate had been built, probably of stone. In 1260 a murage grant was given to Southampton by Edward I, allowing the town to tax selected imports to build and maintain new stone walls; these initial murage grants ran from 1260 to 1275 and were then renewed between 1282 and 1285 and from 1286 to 1291. By the end of this work, many of the earth banks in the north and east of the town had been converted to stone. There appears to have been little interest in defending the west and south quays, however, probably because doing so would have hampered Southampton's merchants when they moved their trading goods in and out of the town.

=== 14th century ===
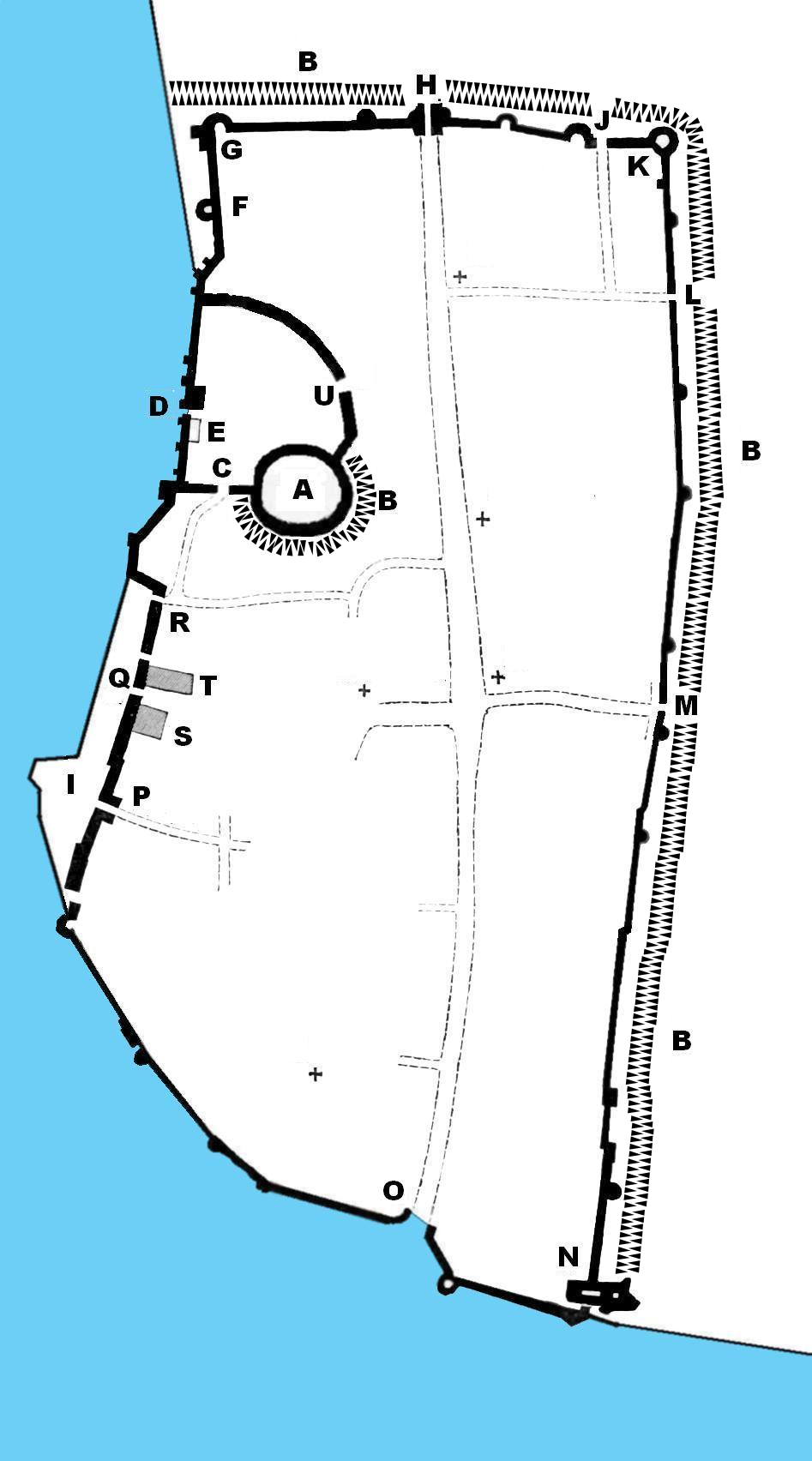
The defences of Southampton in the late medieval period. Key: A – Castle keep; B – Ditch; C – Castle South Gate; D – Castle Water Gate; E – Castle vaults; F – Catchcold Tower; G – Arundel Tower; H – Bargate; I – Docks; J – York Gate; K – Polnymond Tower; L – East Gate; M – Bridge Gate; N – God's House Gate and Tower; O – South Gate; P – West Gate; Q – Blue Anchor Gate; R – Biddles Gate; S – King John's Palace; T – Norman House; U – Castle Eastgate.

By 1300, Southampton was a major port and a large provincial town, with a population of around 5,000. The raising of money through murage grants began again in 1321, possibly paying for the stone towers of the Bargate and some of the semi-circular wall towers. Work also appears to have begun on some stone walling to the south and west of the town, construction may have begun at the South Gate and a wooden barbican was constructed near the western docks. Later investigations by the Crown would suggest that some of the monies raised in these murage grants had been misspent, however, contributing to the poor standard of town defences, which included large gaps in the walled circuit.

In 1338 there was a successful French attack on Southampton: the town's defences, particularly in the west, proved quite inadequate and the French succeeded in burning numerous buildings down, particularly along the western quays, and damaging the castle. Edward III responded to the raid by taking immediate steps to shore up Southampton's defences and ordering the town to be fully enclosed by stone walls. In 1339 the sheriff conscripted workmen and specialists to improve the defences, and money to pay for the building materials was raised by commuting the prison sentence of a senior official in Southampton to a fine. Murage grants were reinstated in 1345, but the economy of Southampton had been temporarily devastated by the raids and indeed never fully recovered. The king's instructions to fully enclose the town with walls could not be carried out. Nonetheless, by the 1350s, Southampton had mounted mangonel and springald siege engines on the existing walls.

In 1360 the king conducted an inquiry into Southampton's defences and in 1363 he established a wider commission to examine how best to improve them. The commission came to a number of conclusions: the town walls should be better maintained and kept clear of housing and other obstructions; the number of gateways in the walls should be reduced; and a water-filled ditch should be built to further reinforce the walls on the west. The enquiry also concluded that the outer doors and ground floor windows of properties facing the sea should be filled in to form a more defensible line.

The resulting work on Southampton's defences resulted in considerable improvements: by the late 14th century, the town was completely encircled by 2 km (1.25 miles) of stone walls. Some existing buildings, including a dovecote, were reinforced and pressed into service as part of the defences. South Gate was built to protect the southern quays, with a wide archway, complete with parapets and machicolations. The building work proved very expensive, however, and despite the mayor and bailiffs enforcing contributions and assistance from the citizens, Parliament had to be asked several times in the 1370s to assist by remitting arrears of taxes owed by Southampton.

In 1370 the French made a successful attack on Portsmouth, commencing a new sequence of raids along the English coast. In due course first Edward, then Richard II, responded by improving the defences in the south of England. Part of this involved improving the condition of Southampton Castle, where, owing in part to the theft of building materials, including stone and lead, by the citizens of the town, the defences were in a poor condition. Henry Yevele, who oversaw the improvements to the castle, probably also constructed the Arcades along the western walls in 1380: this involved adopting the 1360 proposal to block up the properties along the western quay to form a solid wall, and adding three towers and gunports. Sir John Sondes and John Polymond were appointed by the king in 1386 to further improve the town walls, working with Sir John Arundel, the castle governor – Polymond and Arundel Towers were probably named after these men around this time.

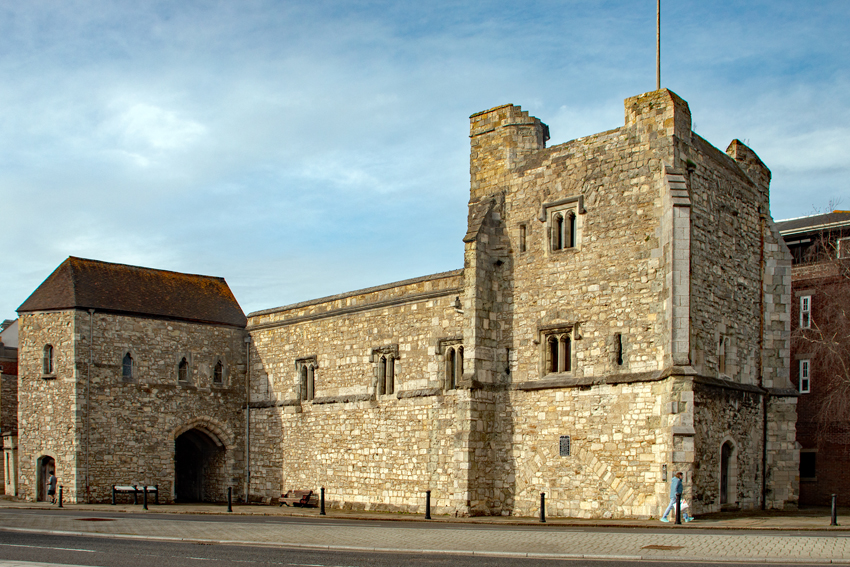
God's House Gate (l) and Tower (r) on the south-east corner of the walls

One of the major changes from the 1370s onwards was the adaptation of the town walls to mount gunpowder weapons. At this time cannon were still unreliable, only capable of reaching relatively short ranges and required the construction of specialist gunports. Cannons fired stone cannonballs, which did relatively little damage to stronger stone walls, and so were primarily used in defence of fortifications rather than as an offensive weapon by besiegers. The first gunports in Britain were installed in the 1360s on the Isle of Wight, but Southampton was not far behind. Around 1378 to 1379 the ongoing French threat led to gunports for handguns being built into the western Arcade wall, and by 1382 the town bought its own gun. God's House Tower was built to defend the southern quays around 1417 and the sluices that controlled the level of the town's moats, and equipped with numerous gunports and rooftop firing points, and by 1439 Catchcold tower had also been constructed, again designed to accommodate gunpowder weapons. (Note: God's House Gate and tower took their name from the nearby hospital called God's House; the origins of Catchcold Tower's name are unclear.)

Another change in the 1370s was the formalisation of the process of guarding and maintaining the walls. During the invasion scare of 1377, Edward instructed the mayor to review these processes; it appears that the four wards of the town were surveyed, and each property was assigned a piece of the wall to maintain, varying according to the size of the property. For these purposes, the walls were measured out in units called loupes, or embrasures. The four wards were also responsible for the security and policing of the town.

=== 15th–16th centuries ===
The threat of French attack continued throughout the 15th century. Instead of relying on murage grants, more funds for the town walls were directly granted by the king in 1400, including an ongoing annual grant of £100. (Note: It is impossible to accurately compare 15th century prices with modern equivalents. For comparison, £100 represents the annual income of a more prosperous member of the English gentry in the 15th century.) Concerns increased significantly after the invasion scare of 1457, when French troops successfully attacked the town of Sandwich on the south coast. Indeed, the guns on Southampton's walls were fired at French raiding ships the same year. The walls continued to be maintained for the rest of the century, with £40 being allocated annually between 1478 and 1485 for this purpose. By contrast, the castle fell into a rapid decline and its inner bailey became used first as a rubbish tip, then for small-scale agriculture.

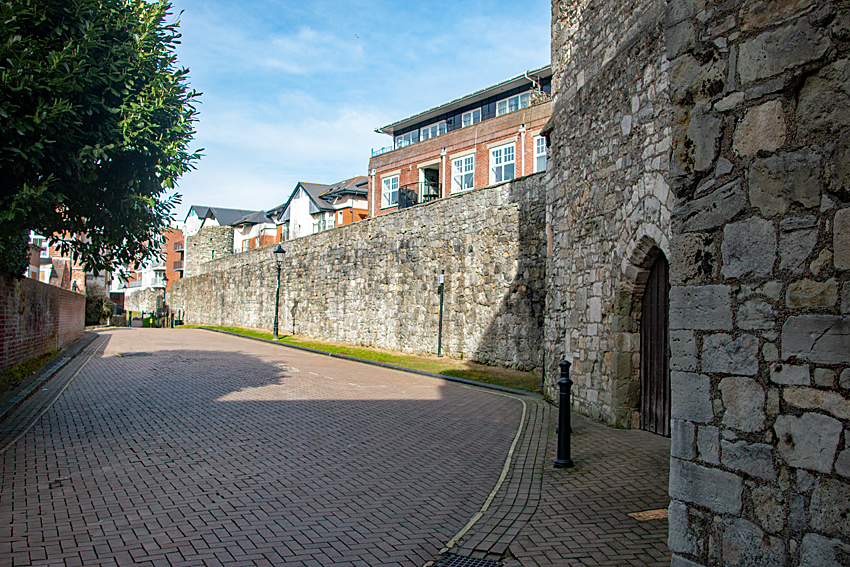
Surviving section of the eastern wall

Nonetheless, a report on the quality of the walls around 1460 noted that on the north and east sides of Southampton, the walls were still too thin to block a cannon shot or for a man to stand on them; a wood and earth wall-walk had been built behind the walls, but this was proving very expensive to maintain. This contemporary assessment of the weakness of the eastern walls has been confirmed by modern archaeological excavation – in places it was only 0.76 m (2.49 feet) thick, compared to a typical thickness in other English town walls of around 1 m (3.28 feet).

A survey in 1454, undertaken against the background of another French invasion scare, shows that the 1377 system for maintaining the walls was still in operation. A town gunner had also been appointed by the 15th century, earning the highest salary of any local official and was responsible for maintaining the guns and manufacturing gunpowder. As late as the mid-16th century, additional improved rectangular gunports, similar to those on the Device Forts along the Channel, were added to the West Gate by the quays.

Several of the gatehouses played an important part in the administration of the town in the 15th century. South Gate formed the main administrative centre for the port during the period, housing the Clerk of the King's Ships and collecting customs revenue. It was expanded in the 1430s and 1440s, but was in poor condition again by the 1480s, resulting in fresh construction work around the site. Bargate was partially used as a prison from the 15th century, in a similar fashion to many other towns. The first floor of the building had been used as the town's guildhall from at least 1441 onwards, and the treasury was kept in one of the towers. Elaborate feasts were served there on special occasions.

=== 17th–20th centuries ===
The town walls became less important for defence in the 17th century, although in 1633, a footpath was built around the inside of the wall to help the watch and other law officers better pursue vagrants and criminals. The walls fared better than Southampton Castle, which was sold off to property speculators in 1618, but they played no part in the English Civil War. Some of the masonry from the castle was reused to strengthen the town walls in 1650 during the Third English Civil War.

In the 18th century onwards the town walls were often adapted for new uses or simply demolished. As early as 1641, the chapel above East Gate had been leased out to private tenants. By 1707, part of God's House tower was being used as a prison; from 1786 it became the official town gaol. As the century progressed, East Gate was demolished in 1774, South Gate was mostly demolished in 1803 and Biddles Gate shortly afterwards, along with large sections of adjacent wall.

As the 19th century progressed, the destruction and remodelling of the town walls continued. The upper stories of Polymond Tower were demolished in the 1820s, to be rebuilt by 1846 as a shorter, two-storey tower. The remains of the South Gate were turned into a hotel. God's House tower continued to be used as a gaol, but was criticised by inspectors. An 1823 report described it as an "old and very awkward" facility, containing around a dozen prisoners in damp conditions, and where it was hard to separate the male and female prisoners in an appropriate fashion. In 1855 its role as a gaol was concluded, and the building fell into disuse.

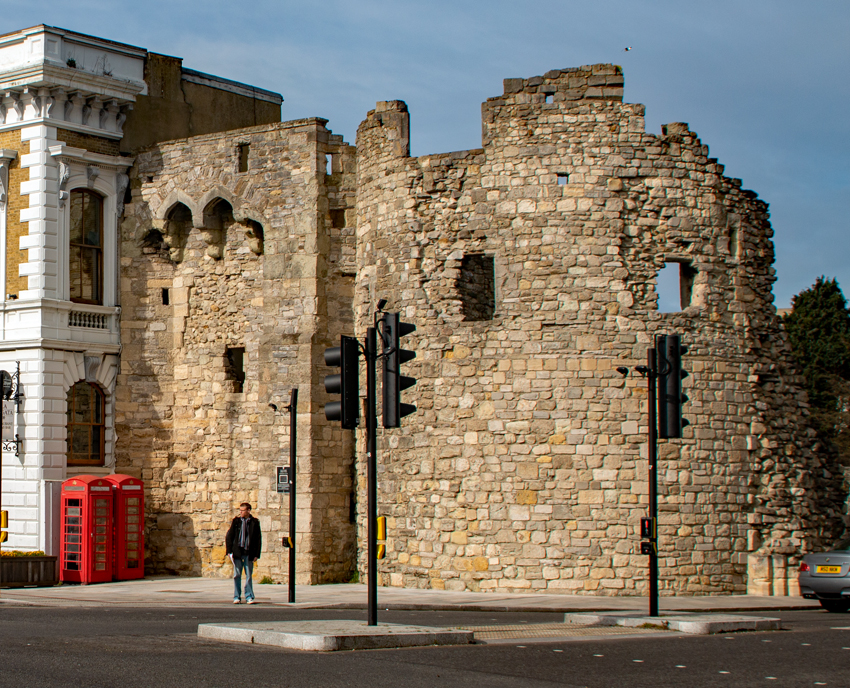
Water Gate tower at Town Quay

In other areas, civic improvements were attempted. In 1853 the "Forty Steps" were built down the side of the west walls to make access to the town easier. Parts of the Arcades were blocked up to prevent homeless people from sleeping under the arches and disturbing the neighbourhood. The Bargate ceased to be used as the guildhall in 1888 and was heavily restored by the town in what was felt to be a more consistent medieval style.

The urban growth of Southampton, as in many English walled towns and cities, put considerable pressure on the older fortifications. In 1898 to 1899, for example, parts of the wall west of Biddles Gate, including a square tower, were demolished to create the Western Esplanade road. By the second half of the century, the Bargate and the surrounding walls were creating serious traffic congestion; various options were considered to relieve this including demolition, but it was not until the 1930s that the decision was made to retain the gatehouse, but to destroy the walls on either side.

Some parts of the Southampton walls were used to mount searchlights and machineguns on during the Second World War; the walls escaped damage, unlike many other areas of the medieval city. In the post-war period the historic importance of the town walls was recognised and considerable conservation work has been conducted on the walls, including reversing the Victorian alterations to the Arcades. The town walls became seen as an important part of Southampton's tourist industry; health and safety concerns, however, prohibit tourists walking along most of the circuit. God's House tower reopened in 1961 as Southampton's Museum of Archaeology. Today the walls are protected as grade I listed buildings and as a scheduled monument.

== Architecture ==
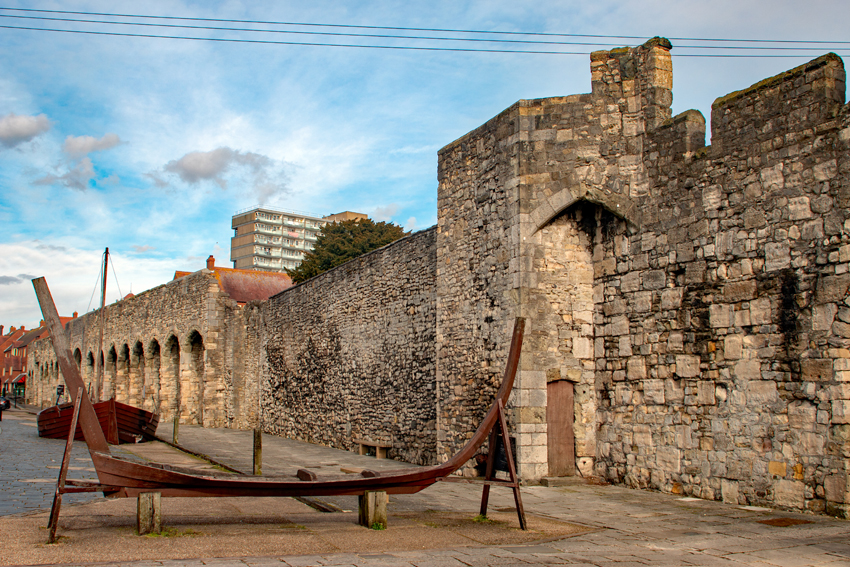
Arcades and the William Nycoll tower

Around half the length of the 2 km (1.25-mile) long medieval town walls still survives in the 21st century, mainly on the north and west sides of Southampton, together with 13 of the 29 defensive towers and six out of the eight gates. The towers are a combination of circular and square designs, with many showing an "open-gorged" design, similar to those built in North Wales, that could be isolated from the rest of the walls by removing small wooden bridges. In general the town walls at Southampton were poorly built in a somewhat chaotic fashion over several years. By contrast, the surviving gatehouses are sophisticated and well designed, probably as a result of their civic importance. Archaeologists Oliver Creighton and Robert Higham describe the surviving walls as "extremely well preserved" and containing "unique survivals in a British context".

In the south-east corner of the walls is God's House tower. This is architecturally important as it was one of the first urban buildings to be built to hold gunpowder artillery – in this respect, it closely resembles Cow Tower in Norwich. The tower was built alongside God's House Gate and is three storeys high. The gunports designed for handcannon can be seen on the outside, and the roof was designed to hold larger cannon. Adjacent to the tower is God's House Gate, a two-storey building also equipped with a gun-port.

Little remains of the eastern walls, but in the north-east corner several towers still remain largely intact, including Polymond tower, a powerful drum tower largely reconstructed during the Victorian period. Further west is the Bargate; this was originally a simple archway but was expanded with drum towers and arrow slits in the early 14th century, and then expanded again in the early 15th century with battlements and parapets, before being heavily restored in the 19th century. The Bargate remains an elaborate building, taking military symbolism and combining it with rich civic heraldry and decoration above the gateway.

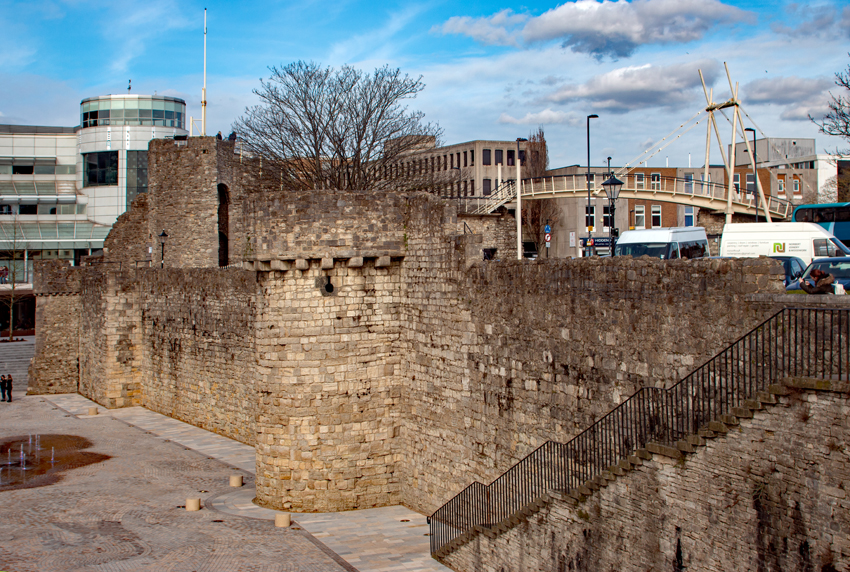
Arundel tower and Catchcold tower

At the north-west corner of the walls stands Arundel tower, another large drum tower that originally overlooked a small cliff. South of this is Catchcold tower which was designed to be defended with guns and has three gunports; the need to support cannon leaves it much heavier in appearance than the other circular towers on the walls. The remains of machine gun mountings fitted to the tower in 1941 can still be seen. The Arcades form part of the surviving west walls and are a unique feature in England; their closest architectural equivalent are in Rouen, France. The West Gate still stands three storeys high and was originally defended by two portcullises; the windows on the west side of the gate are the original medieval designs. Along the south side of the walls one of the twin towers protecting the South Gate still stands, largely intact.

== See also ==
- List of town walls in England and Wales
- Chester city walls
- York city walls

== Bibliography ==
- Brown, Duncan. (1999) "Class and rubbish," in Funari, Hall and Jones (eds) (1999).
- Brown, R. Allen. (1962) English Castles. London: Batsford. OCLC 1392314
- The Committee of the Society for the Improvement of Prison Discipline. (1823) The Fifth Report of the Committee of the Society for the Improvement of Prison Discipline. London: The Committee of the Society for the Improvement of Prison. OCLC 50637575
- Creighton, Oliver Hamilton and Robert Higham. (2005) Medieval Town Walls: an Archaeology and Social History of Urban Defence. Stroud, UK: Tempus. ISBN 978-0-7524-1445-4.
- Curry, Anne and Michael Hughes. (eds) (1994) Arms, Armies and Fortifications in the Hundred Years War. Woodbridge, UK: Boydell Press. ISBN 978-0-85115-755-9.
- Dyer, Christopher. (2009) Making a Living in the Middle Ages: The People of Britain, 850 – 1520. London: Yale University Press. ISBN 978-0-300-10191-1.
- Emery, Anthony. (2006) Greater Medieval Houses of England and Wales, 1300–1500: Southern England. Cambridge: Cambridge University Press. ISBN 978-0-521-58132-5.
- Funari, Pedro Paulo A., Martin Hall and Sian Jones (eds). (1999) Historical Archaeology: Back From The Edge. London: Routledge. ISBN 978-0-415-11787-6.
- Griffiths, Ralph Alan. (1981) The Reign of King Henry VI: the Exercise of Royal Authority, 1422–1461. Berkeley, US: University of California Press. ISBN 978-0-520-04372-5.
- Grinsell, Leslie V. (1958) The Archaeology of Wessex. London: Methuen. OCLC 400319
- Hughes, Michael. (1994) "The Fourteenth Century French Raids on Hampshire and the Isle of Wight," in Curry and Hughes (ed) (1994).
- Kenyon, John R. (1994) "Coastal Artillery Fortification in England in the Late Fourteenth and Early Fifteenth Centuries," in Curry and Hughes (ed) (1994).
- Mackenzie, James D. (1896) The Castles of England: Their Story and Structure, Vol II. New York: Macmillan. OCLC 504892038.
- Ottaway, Patrick. (1992) Archaeology in British towns: from the Emperor Claudius to the Black Death. London: Routledge. ISBN 978-0-415-00068-0.
- Pugh, Ralph B. (1968) Imprisonment in Medieval England. Cambridge: Cambridge University Press. ISBN 978-0-521-06005-9.
- Turner, Hilary. (1971) Town Defences in England and Wales. London: John Baker. OCLC 463160092
