= Timeline of Southampton =

Coordinates: 50.897°N 1.404°W

The following is a timeline of the history of the city of Southampton, Hampshire, England.

== Early history ==
- Roman period – The Roman settlement of Clausentum in Roman Britain is located 20 miles (32 km) west of Noviomagus Reginorum (Now Chichester) and 10 miles (16 km) from Venta Belgarum (Now Winchester), which is roughly in the area of Bitterne Manor.
- 400 – The Anglo-Saxons moved the centre of the town across the River Itchen to what is now the St Mary's area.
- 410 – The Romans abandon the settlement of Clausentum after their occupation of Britain comes to an end.
- 500 – The area now known as Southampton Common can be traced back to this year.
- 700 to 850 – The settlement of Hamwic is founded and becomes an important port and traded with the continent. During this period, it has a population of 2,000 to 3,000.
- 750 – The Market is active.
- 837 – The Town is besieged by Danes, who then 'ravage' it in around 980.
- 1014 – The Viking King Canute the Great defeated the Anglo-Saxon King Ethelred the Unready is crowned in Southampton

== Norman to Tudor periods ==
- 10th century – Southampton town walls originate from around this time
- 11th century – Southampton Castle is built.
- 1070 – St. Michael's Church is founded, making it one of the oldest buildings in Southampton.
- 1086 – The town becomes a Royal Borough.
- 1124 – St Denys Priory is founded by Henry I.
- 1127 – An Augustinian priory was founded in St Denys on 364 acres (1.47 km^{2}) of land granted by Henry I.
- 1173 – The St Mary Magdalen leper Hospital is established to the north of the town.
- 1180 – This is the approximate date that Bargate is built.
- 1189 – Richard I. "freed the burgesses from tolls and all secular customs".
- c. 1196 – St Julians Hospital, which is otherwise known as God's House Hospital, is founded by Gervase 'le Riche'
- 1197 – This is the approximate date that the Church of St. Julien is established.
- By 13th century – Southampton becomes a leading port and is particularly involved in the trade of French wine and English wool.
- 1200 – This is the approximate date that the Long House is built.
- 1220 – This is the approximate date that Walter Fortin becomes the mayor.
- 1233 – This is the approximate date that the Franciscan Friary is founded.
- 1236 – The Jews are expelled.
- 1239 – Netley Abbey is founded near the town.
- 1256 – Henry III "granted all the liberties and customs enjoyed by Winchester".
- 1299 – Bowling Green is in use and remains the oldest used Bowls green in the world as of 2023.
- late 13th C. – God's House Tower starts operating as a gatehouse into the old town.
- 1300 – Southampton's population is approximately 5,000.
- 1319 – The Venetian state fleet visits Southampton.
- 1320 – Holyrood Church is built.
- 1338 – The town is taken by French forces.
- 1348 – The Black Plague reaches Southampton.
- 1415 – August: The ringleaders of the Southampton Plot are executed at Bargate.
- 1445 – The charter of incorporation is given by Henry VI.
- 1461 – Southampton fair is active.
- 1492 to 1531 – All exports of tin and lead are required to pass through Southampton.
- 1495 – The Tudor House and Garden is built.
- 1552 – King Edward VI visits the town.
- 1553 – The 'Free Grammar School off the Mayor Baliffs and Burgesses of the Towne and County of Southampton', which is now known as King Edward VI School, is granted letters patent by Edward VI.
- 1554
  - Southampton is granted a monopoly on the export of wool to the Mediterranean and on the import of sweet wine.
  - King Philip II of Spain visits the town.

== Stuart period ==
- 1603 – James VI and I and Anne of Denmark make their Royal Entry to Southampton on 20 October.
- 1640 – The charter "was finally given" by Charles I.
- The English Civil War takes place:
  - 1642 – A Parliamentary garrison moves into Southampton.
  - 1644 – In March, a Royalist army advanced as far as Redbridge, but are prevented from taking the town by Colonel Richard Norton. In the same month, the Battle of Cheriton subsequently removes the threat to Southampton.
- 1664 – In June, the Black Death returns to Southampton. By the time the epidemic ended in November 1666, 1,700 people had died.
- 1669 – King Charles II visits the town.
- 1689 - The right to vote in parliamentary elections, which had previously been limited to freemen, was extended to include those paying Scot and lot in Southampton.

== Georgian and Regency periods ==
- 1740 - Southampton becomes a spa town, with the town becoming a popular site for sea bathing in the 1760s.
- 1759 to 1803 – Walter Taylor's 18th century mechanisation of the block-making process in Southampton wins him a monopoly on the supply of wooden rigging blocks for the Royal Navy and was a significant step in the Industrial Revolution
- 1760 – Taunton's School is founded.
- 1761 – The Assembly rooms are built.
- 1766 – The Theatre Royal is built.
- 1772 – The Hampshire Chronicle newspaper begins publication.
- 1773 – The Polygon residential and commercial development is completed.
- 1774 – A canal between Eling and Salisbury is proposed, but was never built.
- 1779 – A canal linking Southampton (at Redbridge) to Andover is proposed, but was never built.
- 1795 – All Saints' Church is completed.
- 1796
  - The Redbridge to Andover canal is completed.
  - The Northam Bridge Company is formed, with a toll bridge being built and opened in Northam in September 1799.
- 1798 – Thorners Charity is built.
- 1799 – The Northam Bridge is built.
- 1802 – The Salisbury and Southampton Canal begins operating.
- 1822 – The Southampton County Chronicle newspaper begins publication.
- 1823
  - The Public dispensary is established.
  - The Hampshire Advertiser newspaper is established and circulates until 1900 from an earlier publication, the Herald.
- 1829 – The painter John Everett Millais is born, with Southampton Solent University's art gallery named the Millais Gallery in his honour.
- 1830 – The Southampton Polytechnic Institution is established.
- 1831 – Southampton's population is 19,324.
- 1832 – 8 July: The London and South Western Railway begins as the London and Southampton Railway
- 1833 – The Royal Pier opens, but it's closed by 1979 before becoming derelict. The gatehouse is now a Grade II listed building.
- 1835
  - The Municipal Corporations Act 1835 abolishes Southampton's jurisdiction of Portsmouth's port.
  - The Royal South Hants Hospital is formed.
- 1836
  - The Woolston Floating Bridge (Ferry) connects Southampton to Woolston and Portsmouth on the east bank of the River Itchen.
  - The Police force is established.
  - The Southampton Dock Company is incorporated.

== Victorian period ==
- 1838 - In October, the first stone of the docks is laid by Sir Admiral Lucius Curtis.
- 1839 – Southampton Terminus railway station opens.
- 1840s - Sewers are built in Southampton.
- 1840 - In May, the London and Southampton Railway is fully opened to Southampton Terminus.
- 1841
  - The Ordnance Survey arrives in the town.
  - Southampton's population is 27,744.
- 1842
  - On 29 August, the first dock opens.
  - The builders merchant Elliott Brothers is in business.
- 1843 – In May, the Royal Mail Steam Packet Company operated its services from Southampton, officially designating the port as the packet station.
- 1844 – With its good transport links, Southampton became the emigrant station for North America and Canada
- 1846 – Southampton Old Cemetery begins operating.
- 1847 – The Riding School at Carlton Place is completed.
- 1848 to 1849 – A cholera epidemic reaches Southampton.
- 1849 – The bookseller James & Co. is in business.
- 1855 – Southampton School of Art, and the prison on Ascupart Street are established.
- 1856 – Netley Hospital, a.k.a. Royal Victoria Hospital, opens.
- 1860 – The Southampton Times newspaper begins publication.
- 1861 – 10 September: Red Funnel ferries start operating ferry services between Southampton and Cowes on the Isle of Wight.
- 1862 – The Hartley Institute is founded.
- 1865 – A second cholera epidemic reaches Southampton.
- 1866 – A branch line extended the railway over the River Itchen at St Denys to pass through Bitterne and Woolston to Netley.
- 1870s – More sewers are built in Southampton.
- 1872 – The Ordnance Survey buildings are constructed.
- 1874 – The Hythe Pier, Hythe & Southampton Ferry company is formed, with a ferry service starting from Southampton in 1880 after the pier is completed.
- 1875
  - The Watts Memorial Hall is built.
  - The Royal Southampton Yacht Club is chartered.
- 1876 – Above Bar Church is founded.
- 1879 – The Southampton Tramways Company begins operating.
- 1884 – St. Mary's Church is built.
- 1885 – St. Mary's Young Men's Association Football Club, and the Hampshire Field Club are established.
- 1889
  - Southampton Free Public Library is established.
  - St Mary's Road drill hall is completed.
- 1890 – September: The Southampton Dock Strike of 1890 takes place.
- 1891
  - The Didcot, Newbury and Southampton Railway begins operating.
  - Southampton Docks is acquired by the London and South Western Railway company.
- 1894 – The part of South Stoneham, within the borough, became the parish of Portswood under the Local Government Act 1894.
- 1895
  - Bitterne (portion), Freemantle, Millbrook, and Shirley become part of Southampton.
  - Southampton West railway station opens.
  - The parish of Shirley was added under the Local Government Act 1894.
- 1898
  - Southampton Football Club is founded.
  - The Dell (stadium) opens.
- 1899 – The bookseller David Holmes is in business.
- 1900 – Southampton General Hospital is founded as the Southampton Union Infirmary.
- 1901 – Southampton's population is 104,824.

== 20th century ==
=== 1900 to 1949 ===
- 1902 – Warsash Maritime School opens on Newtown Road in Warsash village, with its current campus in St Mary's opening in 2017.
- 1905 – Southampton Record Society is founded.
- 1907 – White Star Line relocates to Southampton from Liverpool.
- 1908 – Southampton Water serves as one of the sailing and motorboating venues for the 1908 Summer Olympics.
- 1912
  - The Tudor House Museum is established.
  - 10 April: The RMS Titanic departs Southampton on her maiden and final voyage; later sinks on 14 April.
- 1913 – The Palladium Cinema opens.
- 1914
  - The Scala Cinema opens.
  - 22 April: The Titanic Engineers' Memorial is unveiled in East Park to commemorate the engineers who lost their lives on the RMS Titanic 2 years prior.
  - 4 August: Southampton was designated No. 1 Military Embarkation Port following the outbreak of World War I, and much of Southampton Common is taken over by the military.
- 1914 to 1918: Over 8 million troops pass through Southampton on the way to Mainland Europe to fight in World War I. Alongside this, A steady flow of refugees, prisoners of war and over 1 million wounded came back to England through Southampton.
- 1919
  - January: Soldiers returning from World War I mutinied in the port.
  - Cunard Line relocates to Southampton from Liverpool.
- 1920
  - Bitterne Parish Council and Itchen Urban District Council are incorporated into the borough of Southampton. Bassett and Swaythling are incorporated into Southampton at the same time.
  - The Cenotaph (war memorial) is unveiled in Watts Park.
- 1928 – The Empire Theatre opens.
- 1929 – On 26 March, Southampton Corporation purchases Northam Bridge from the Northam Bridge Company, with the tolls being removed on 16 May. At the same time, the tolls at Lances Hill, Hedge End and the bridge at Bursledon were also abolished.
- 1932
  - Southampton Municipal Airport is established.
  - Bargate is bypassed on its eastern side. It then becomes an island when it was bypassed on its western side in 1938.
- 1933 – King George V Graving Dock opens.
- 1934
  - The Clock Tower is relocated from Above Bar to Bitterne Park Triangle to facilitate further road improvements.
  - The Floating Bridge is taken over by Southampton Corporation and is the only remaining toll in Southampton until 1977.
- 1937
  - Southampton Guildhall opens.
  - The company Foster, Wikner Aircraft relocates to Southampton.
- 1939 – Southampton City Art Gallery opens.
- World War II:
  - 1940
    - 15 September: The Supermarine factory is bombed
    - November: During the Blitz, 476 tons of bombs are dropped on Southampton.
  - D-day operations of 1943–1944:
    - July 1943 – Military exercise Harlequin tested the ports' capacity for embarking troops and equipment.
    - 1 April to 25 August: During D-day preparations, Southampton was within Regulated Area (No 2), which placed the local population under certain restrictions that were intended to secure the military operation.
    - After: Southampton continued to work at full capacity to re-supply the Allied Forces on mainland Europe.
  - 1944
    - 12 July: The only flying bomb to hit Southampton lands in Sholing.
    - 5 November: The last air raid takes place in Southampton.
- 1947 – 14 April: The RMS Queen Elizabeth runs aground on a sandbank just outside of Southampton.

=== 1950 to 1999 ===
- By the 1950s – Mayflower Park is laid out.
- 1952 – The Hartley University College is granted a royal charter to give the University of Southampton full university status.
- 1954 – The Northam Bridge is rebuilt.
- 1961 – The Museum of Archaeology opens in God's House Tower.
- 1962 – The City of Southampton Society founded, and then Southampton becomes a city in 1964.
- 1964 – Southampton is awarded city status by the Letters Patent and Queen Elizabeth II.
- 1965 – Wilton Royal factory opens near city.
- 1966 – Southampton Maritime Museum opens in The Wool House.
- 1967 - Southampton takes in part of the Nursling and Rownhams parishes.
- 1968 – The Southampton Boat Show begins.
- 1969
  - Southampton Technical College is established.
  - Television Centre is built, and it then closes in 2008.
- 1971 – The university's Southampton School of Medicine opens.
- 1972 – Southampton loses its county borough status under the Local Government Act 1972 to become a non-metropolitan district.
- 1973 – Southampton is twinned with Le Havre in France.
- 1976
  - Griffon Hoverwork Ltd is founded under the names Griffon Hovercraft and Hoverwork Ltd, with the current name being used since 2008.
  - Summer: Southampton has the hottest June day ever recorded during the heatwave this year, where it reaches 35.6 °C (96.1 °F).
- 1977 – 1 June: The Itchen Bridge opens with a toll, with the Woolston Floating Bridge (ferry) stopping operations.
- 1978 – Southampton is twinned with Busan in South Korea.
- 1979 – The John Hansard Gallery is established.
- 1984
  - Southampton Institute of Higher Education is established as a merger of Southampton College of Art. It then merges with the Southampton College of Technology, and later the College of Nautical Studies at Warsash.
  - The aviation museum Solent Sky opens.
- 1985 – The Medieval Merchant's House is restored.
- 1986
  - The Ocean Village (marina) area is redeveloped. The latest of these developments, the Ocean Village Harbour Hotel, is completed in October 2017.
  - Southampton Citybus is in operation.
- 1989 – Bargate Shopping Centre is built.
- 1991
  - The Marlands Shopping Centre is in business.
  - Southampton is twinned with Rems-Murr-Kreis in Germany.
- 1995 – The M3 motorway opens, forming an artery between the South Coast, Isle of Wight and London.
- 1996 – The Southampton Oceanography Centre opens.
- 1997 – Southampton becomes a unitary authority.
- 1998 – Southampton is twinned with Hampton in Virginia and Qingdao in China.

== 21st century ==
=== 2000 to 2019 ===
- 2000
  - 28 September: WestQuay shopping centre is in business.
  - The Chamberlayne Leisure Centre opens in Mayfield Park.
- 2001 – Southampton's population is 217,400.
- 2002 – Southampton is twinned with Trieste in Italy.
- 2004 – The Southampton park run begins, with the group using Southampton Common since 2015.
- 2005 – Southampton Solent is given University status, which includes Southampton College of Art, the Southampton College of Technology, and later the College of Nautical Studies from its previous merger as the Southampton Institute of Higher Education in 1984.
- 2011 – Southampton's population is 236,900.
- 2012 – April: Southampton commemorates the 100th anniversary of the sinking of the RMS Titanic with ships sounding their horns at 12 pm and a memorial service. SeaCity Museum also opens to commemorate this.
- 2013 – Bargate Shopping Centre closes, and its demolition begins on 24 November 2017.
- 2015 – 3 January: The Ro-Ro car carrier Höegh Osaka became stranded on a sandbank outside of Southampton Water after developing a major list from an unstable load of cars. She was eventually refloated on 22 January, and all of her 24 crew survived with minimal injuries.
- 2016 – WestQuay Watermark opens.
- 2017
  - November: The council selects an official flag for the city through a competition to design one.
  - Warsash Maritime School relocates to its current campus in St Mary's as part of Solent University's major redevelopment work, which is opened by HRH Anne, Princess Royal on 18 January 2018. The STCW training centre in Warsash village remains part of the university, the former teaching and accommodation facilities are set to be converted into flats, and the simulation centre on the main university campus has major upgrade work. All of this is completed by 2019.
  - The Southampton pride parade begins.
- 2019
  - 17 to 19 May: The South Coast Boat Show holds its first event in Ocean Village.
  - 14 June: Southampton is twinned with Miami in Florida.

=== 2020 to 2039 ===
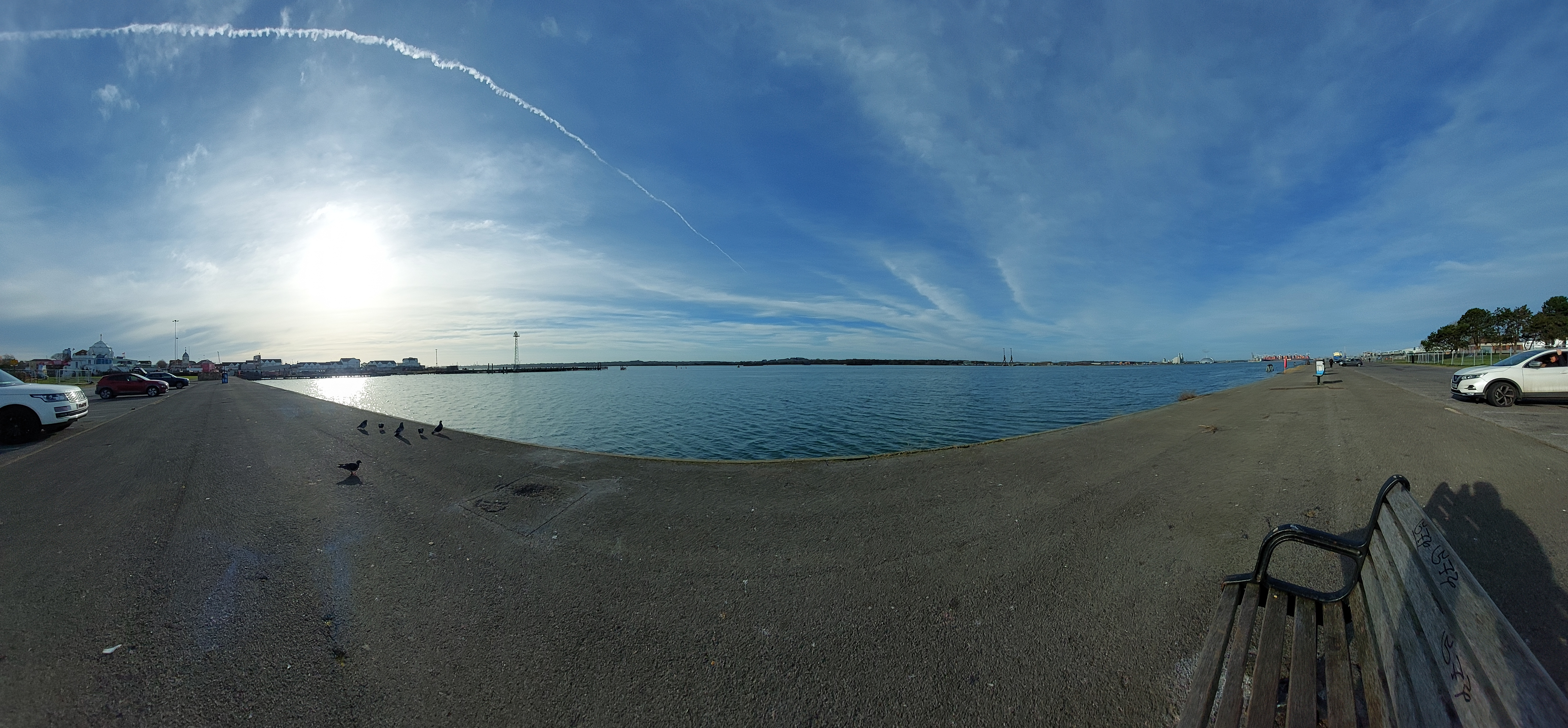
A panoramic view of Southampton Water from Mayflower Park. Taken in February 2023.

- 2020
  - 23 March: Southampton goes into a nationwide lockdown with the rest of the UK due to the COVID-19 pandemic.
  - 5 November: Southampton joins the rest of the UK in a nationwide lockdown that lasts until 2 December in an attempt to reduce the number of cases.
  - 20 December: Southampton moves to Tier 4 restriction after being in Tier 3 restrictions since 2 December.
- 2021
  - 4 January: The Prime Minister Boris Johnson announces that Southampton, along with the rest of the UK, will go into another nationwide lockdown to control the new variants of COVID-19 from 6 January, which will last at least until the Spring. Then on 22 February, he announces plans to bring the UK, including Southampton, cautiously out of lockdown, with plans for restrictions to be fully lifted by 21 June.
  - 16 May: The P&O cruise ship 'Iona' is christened in Southampton by Dame Irene Hays, with her maiden voyage taking place on 7 August to Scotland and the Channel Isles.
  - 14 June: Plans to end COVID-19 restrictions are delayed by 4 weeks to 19 July due to a sharp rise of the Delta variant.
  - 19 July: COVID-19 restrictions in England, including Southampton, come to an end after Prime Minister Boris Johnson confirms this on 12 July.
  - September: Southampton secures its place in its bid to become the City of Culture in 2025.
  - 9 November: Southampton Airport is named as the best in the UK and the third best globally for sustainability performance as part of COP26 in Glasgow.
  - 8 December: Prime Minister Boris Johnson announces plan B of COVID-19 restrictions due to a sharp increase of the Omicron variant.
  - Southampton's population is 261,729.
- 2022
  - 26 January: Plan B measures for COVID-19 restrictions across the UK, including Southampton, come to an end after Prime Minister Boris Johnson announces this on 19 January following a decline in the Omicron variant.
  - 18 February: Red Funnel's 'Red Falcon' crashes into Southampton's ferry terminal as a result of Storm Eunice, but she only sustains light damage to her hull near the bow.
  - 24 February: Prime Minister Boris Johnson removes the last of the COVID-19 restrictions (compulsory isolation with a positive test) in Southampton and the rest of the UK.
  - 4 March: AIDAcosma, which is owned by AIDA Cruises, makes her maiden voyage from Southampton.
  - 9 March: Solent Sky is given permission to build its £5,000,000 extension to house more aircraft and other attractions.
  - 21 March: Southampton is announced as one of the four cities to be shortlisted to be the City of Culture in 2025 alongside Bradford, County Durham and Wrexham County, but loses to Bradford on 31 May.
  - 2 July: Plans for a new underground link between Southampton's and Netley's railway lines are announced. If approved, this would link Southampton Central station and the Netley line to provide a more direct and faster route to Portsmouth at a cost of £45 billion.
  - 27 July: Red Funnel's staff go on strike over their pay, affecting evening services.
  - 12 August: A drought is officially declared in the south of England, including Southampton, during the second heatwave of this year.
  - 1 November: It's announced that Celebrity Apex of Celebrity Cruises is to homeport in Southampton.
  - 6 November: Carnival Celebration of Carnival Cruise Line arrives in Southampton on her maiden voyage.
  - 8 November: An 'Operational incident' is declared at the nearby Fawley Refinery, causing an orange glow to be seen up to 25 miles away across Hampshire and the South Coast and with flares being seen in Southampton.
  - 29 November: First Bus South end all bus services in Southampton, with Bluestar taking over their routes.
  - 18 December: P&O Cruises' newest ship Arvia arrives in Southampton for her inaugural voyage on 23 December.
  - December: Royal Mail strikes affect Southampton's Christmas post.
  - Southampton's railway services are affected during the National Union of Rail, Maritime and Transport Workers (RMT) and ASLEF rail strikes throughout this year and into early 2023
- 2023
  - 6 January: The Southampton-based cruise ship Arvia arrives in Barbados for her naming ceremony.
  - 13 February: Improvement works to Southampton Central station begins, with the forecourt expected to be completed by July this year.
  - 30 March: Southampton General Hospital unveils its £1.5 million paediatric intensive care unit (PICU) upgrade.
  - 15 April: A Titanic rail trip to Southampton is recreated for the 111th anniversary event of the ship's sinking on the Watercress Line.
  - 20 April: A new low-carbon freight train hauling containers starts a service from Scotland to Southampton using hydrogenated vegetable oil (HVO).
  - 26 April: Queen Mary 2's Transatlantic voyage to New York City is cancelled after a technical issue was found, with a Coronation Cruise departing on 2 May instead.
  - 9 May:
    - Hampshire County Council's Capital House in Winchester is sold to Southampton University.
    - A landslip on the railway between Winchester and Basingstoke causes disruption to rail services from Southampton towards London Waterloo.
  - 31 July: The University of Southampton is allowed to retain its temporary classrooms for a further 5 years from 1 January 2024.
  - 8 September: It's announced that the Hythe Ferry service between the Town Quay and Hythe is saved after Red Funnel buy it.
  - 7 November: easyJet take off from Southampton Airport for the first time, with routes to Belfast International and Glasgow airports.
  - Southampton's mainline railway services continue to be affected as the National Union of Rail, Maritime and Transport Workers (RMT) rail strikes continue into this year.

== See also ==
- History of Southampton
- Timelines of other cities in South East England: Oxford, Portsmouth, Reading
