= God's House =

God's House may refer to:

- God's House (film), a documentary film currently in production
- God's House, Cambridge, a former college of the University of Cambridge
- God's House Hospital, a group of almshouses in Southampton, England
- God's House Tower, a fortified entrance gate to Southampton
