= Southampton City Centre =

Coordinates: 50.9014°N 1.4041°W

- Location within Southampton
- Unitary authority: Southampton
- Ceremonial county: Hampshire
- Region: South East
- Country: England
- Sovereign state: United Kingdom
- Post town: SOUTHAMPTON
- Postcode district: SO14
- Dialling code: 023
- Police: Hampshire and Isle of Wight
- Fire: Hampshire and Isle of Wight
- Ambulance: South Central
- UK Parliament: Southampton Itchen

Southampton City Centre is the commercial and organisational centre of the City of Southampton, England, and the transport hub of the city. The traditional heart of the city is the High Street, which runs from the Town Quay to the Bargate,, which was once the northern gateway to the walled city. As the city grew, this primary commercial area spread to the north of the Bargate, into Above Bar Street. Subsequent reclamation of land from Southampton Water to the west of the High Street led to further expansion in that direction, forming an area now known as West Quay, dominated by the modern Westquay shopping centre. When it opened in 2000, Westquay was the largest city-centre shopping centre in Europe, with around 100 shops.

The area is bounded in the north by the Southampton Central Parks.

== Culture ==
There are several museums in the city centre, especially around the "Old Town" area. The museums include the Tudor House Museum, Medieval Merchant's House, God's House Tower, Solent Sky and the Maritime Museum.

== Shopping ==
The main shopping district of the city is centred on Above Bar Street (part of which is pedestrianised), London Road, High Street and East Street.

There are two indoor shopping centres in the area, namely Westquay, and the Marlands Shopping Centre, and two that closed in the 2010s - Bargate and EaSTreet. West Quay retail park, not to be confused with the similarly named shopping centre, is also located in the city centre. The Marlands Shopping Centre was opened on 5 September 1991. In 2005–2006 the centre was revamped by adding an improved entrance at Above Bar Street and a new information desk. The shopping centre formerly featured a series of fountains but these had to be put out of service due to health and safety reasons in late 2005. Matalan shut its shop on 28 May 2014.

On 12 February 2009, Swedish furniture retailer IKEA opened its 18th British store, on West Quay Road.

=== East Street Shopping Centre ===
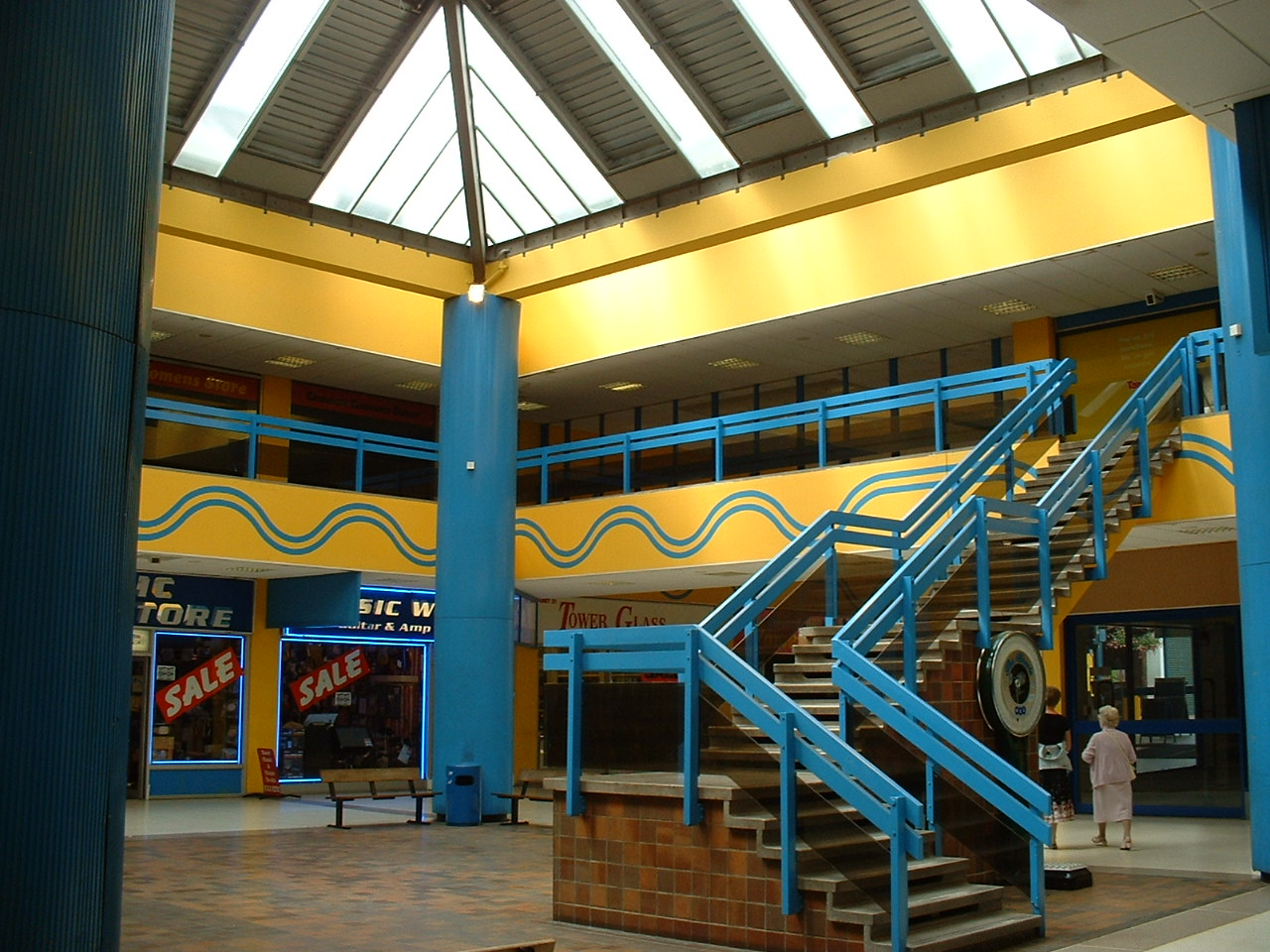
East Street shopping centre's central atrium

East Street Shopping Centre, branded EaSTreet, was Southampton's earliest indoor shopping centre. The centre was built at the eastern end of East Street and blocked off the street itself as it was built over the top of it.

The centre was constructed in the 1970s and due to its location – outside the main city centre shopping district – was never commercially successful. As well as the shopping centre, the development included a large office tower, rooftop car park and the Royal Oak pub. The centre was originally anchored by Comet Electrical and Courts furniture store, however the demise of this chain in the late 1980s/early 90s left mainly independent shops and empty units in the centre. A Tandy electronics store (Later T2 Retail) was part of the centre until the early 21st century but again, this store chain no longer exists and the vacated unit remained empty. One of the longest established shops in the centre was Teville's music shop which was one of the only musical instrument shops in the city (after the brief arrival and swift demise of nearby SoundControl. The other music shop is Beckett's on Commercial Road, near Central Station). The final sole occupant of East Street Shopping Centre was a SCRATCH outlet (a Southampton-based charity) until they relocated in 2012. The centre remained empty but was still open to the public who could use the car park facilities and the various access points.

In November 2012, Arcadian Estates were granted permission by Southampton City Council to demolish East Street Shopping Centre as part of a £30 million redevelopment. In mid 2013, the centre was closed to the public and demolition began in October 2013. The original redevelopment was for a new Morrisons foodstore and an open pedestrian thoroughfare re-linking St Mary's back to the city centre. However, in late 2014, De Stefano Property Group, the landowners of the demolished site, went into administration and Morrisons announced in March 2015 they were closing loss making stores on the back of poor trading results. Finally in June 2015, Morrisons officially confirmed they would not be building a new store on this site. It was also reported other firms have put in offers to build here as a result of Morrison's withdrawal.

=== Bargate Shopping Centre ===
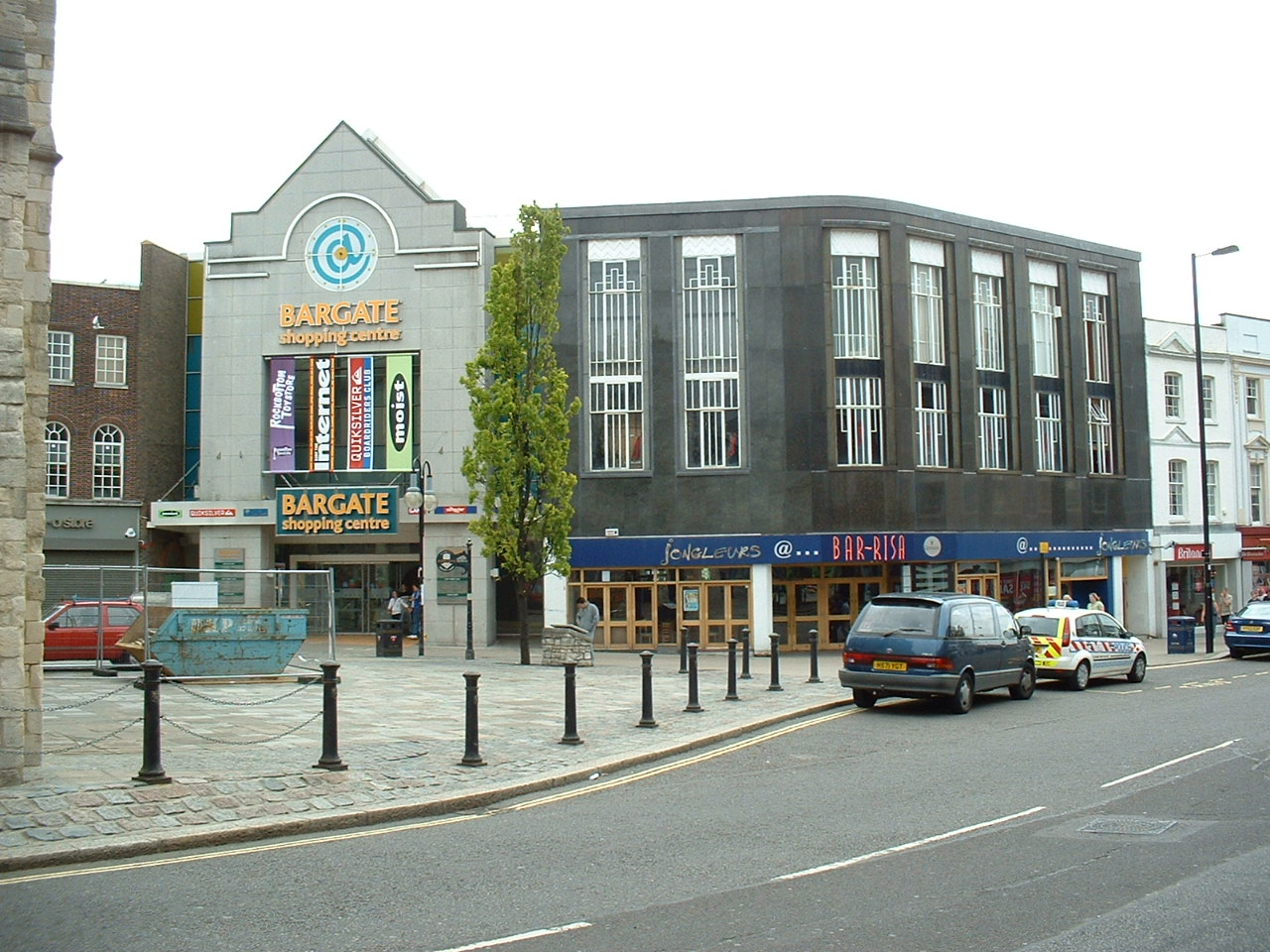
The Bargate Centre in 2005

The Bargate Shopping Centre, named after Southampton's prominent Bargate landmark, was opened in 1989. The centre focused on being a collection of specialist outlets rather than a mainstream shopping centre, and boasted a number of technology-related stores, a nail salon, a photographic studio and a Sega Park arcade.

It was set out over two levels and to a very simple design of a single mall leading to an atrium although there was an internet cafe on the lower ground floor of the atrium. Also off this atrium was the largest unit in the centre, originally occupied by The Reject Shop and then the Sega Park arcade from 1996 until closure. The Bargate Centre also contained a multi-storey car park.

Unlike a lot of shopping centres from this era, the Bargate Centre never had a major refurbishment.

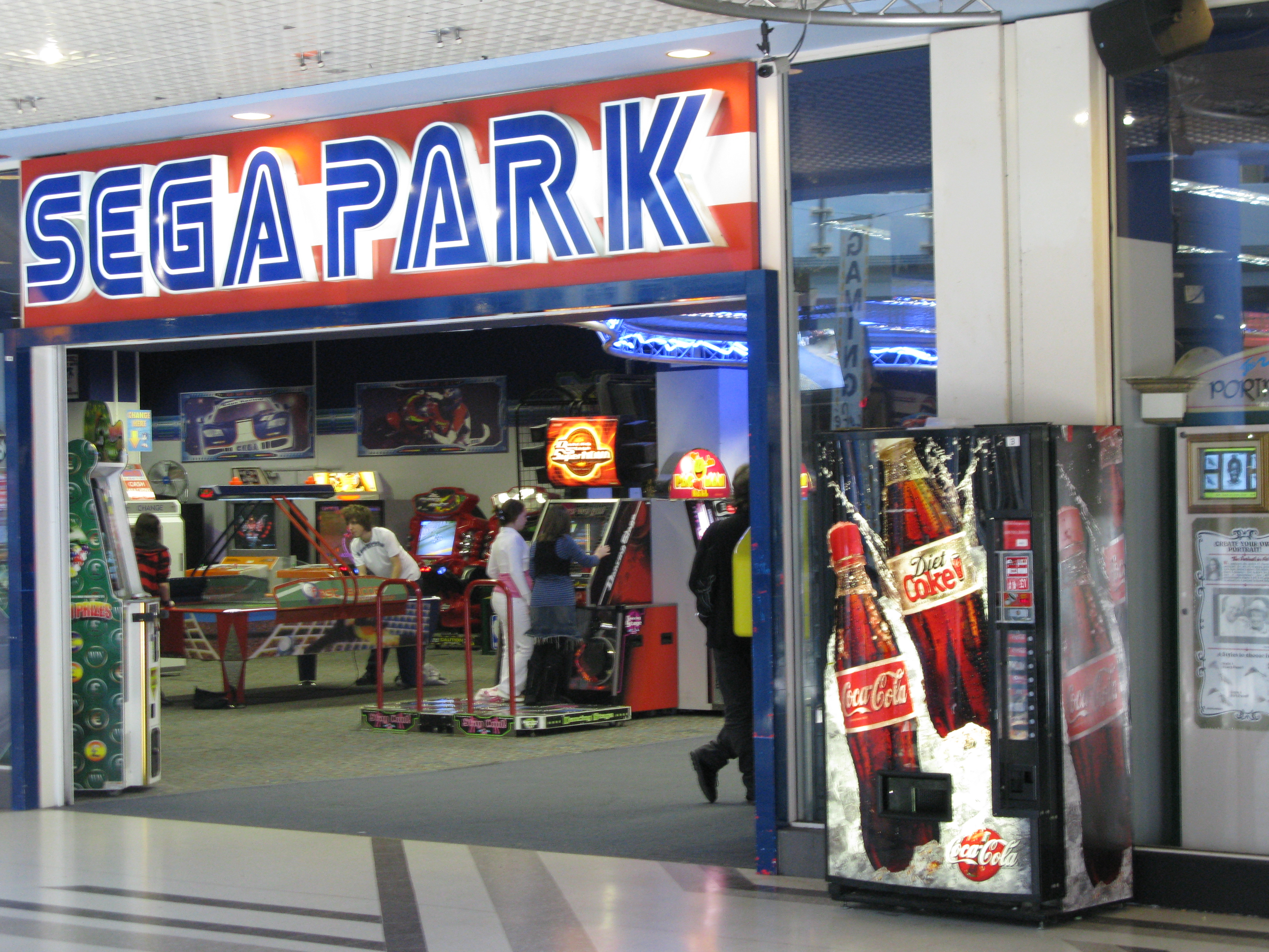
Entrance to Sega Park within the Bargate Shopping Centre

While it lacked the mainstream popularity of the nearby Westquay and Marlands shopping centres, the Bargate Centre was popular with teenagers due to the alternative fashion stores and Sega Park.

A local newspaper reported in 2009 that the Bargate Centre was to be demolished, along with the nearby Debenhams store. The Bargate Centre site would be converted into a covered street, with a new Debenhams store incorporated into it, and the existing Debenhams store would be replaced with a residential tower block. However, these plans were later scrapped and the Debenhams store underwent a multimillion-pound revamp in 2011.

In January 2013, all traders inside the Bargate Centre were given notice to leave their premises by BNP Paribas Real Estate, who were attempting to sell the complex. BNP Paribas Real Estate were appointed by the Receivers for Parkridge (Bargate) Ltd, the company who bought the Bargate Centre in 2009. Parkridge (Bargate) Ltd were liquidated in late 2011 after running up major losses. BNP Paribas Real Estate stated that the complex had remained open at a "significant loss" for months and closure was required to stem these losses. They also stated some tenants were not being charged any rent for their premises. By mid-April 2013, all remaining tenants had vacated their premises. The Bargate Centre and its multi storey car park finally closed on 10 June 2013. However, in 2015, the multi-storey car park was re-opened for use under the management of National Car Parks.

On 26 September 2014, the Daily Echo newspaper reported on a developer's proposal to demolish the Bargate Centre building and replace it with a new street containing shops and flats.On 28 July 2015, it was reported that a new company called Bargate Ltd had acquired control of the building, and was considering mixed-use redevelopment. A public consultation on the future of the site began in September 2015 and a redevelopment plan was revealed on 19 May 2016. Demolition work began on 24 November 2017, with plans to replace the Bargate Centre with a "pedestrianised street" as part of a larger redevelopment in the surrounding area.

=== Marlands ===
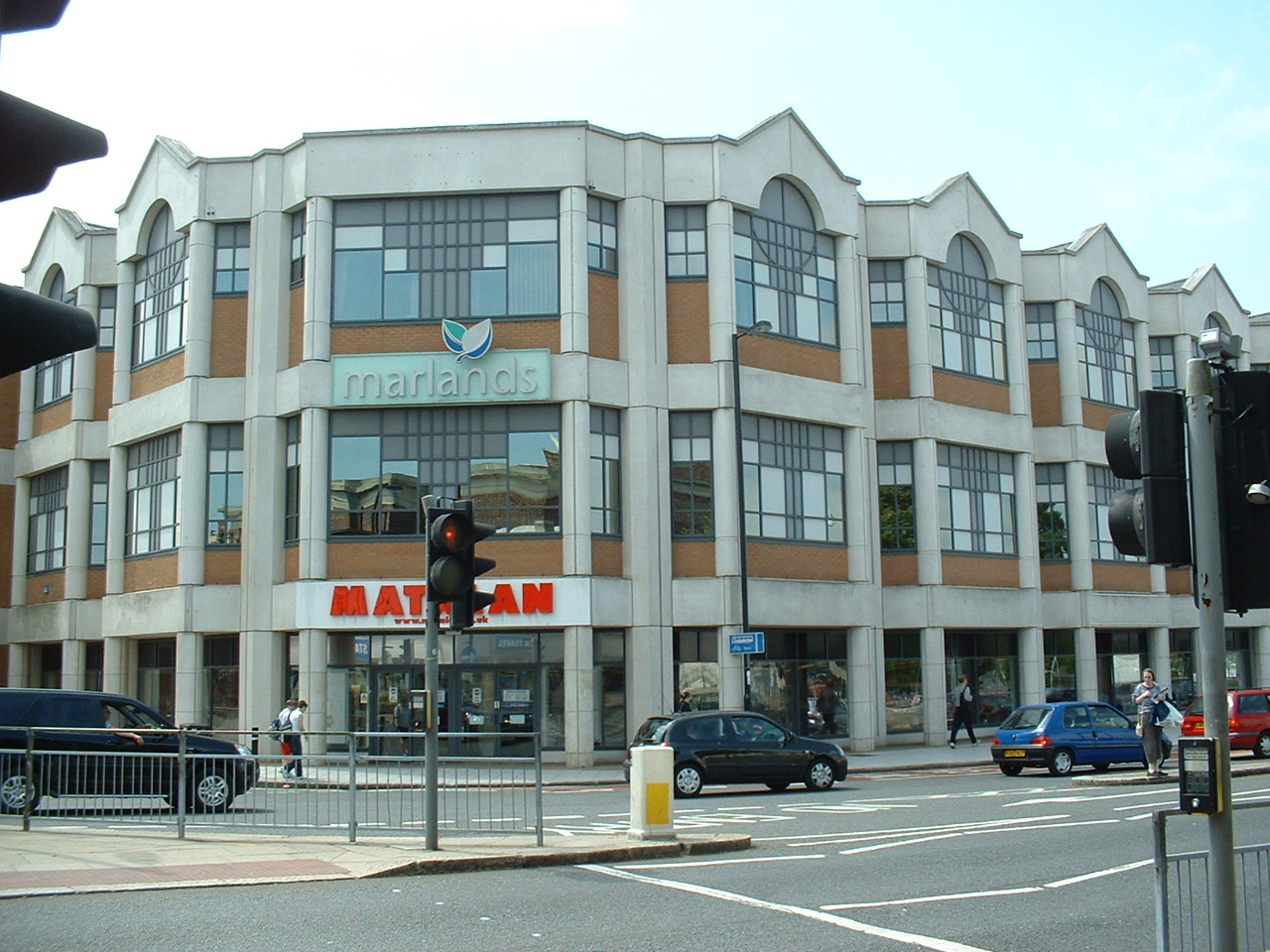
Marlands

The Marlands Shopping Centre was opened on 5 September 1991. At the time, it was the largest shopping centre in Southampton and the first significant shopping centre in the city (East Street Shopping Centre being well out of the way of the main shopping district hence never being very successful and the Bargate Centre being much smaller), however it is now dwarfed by Westquay, which opened in 2000.

The Marlands Shopping Centre was constructed to a PostModern design, which was described at the time of opening by one critic as looking like "something made of Lego". The centre was built on the site of Southampton's bus station (the city is now without such a facility), a popular rose garden and some terraced housing. Some of the facades of the houses were reconstructed in the centre's atrium.

The centre is laid out across two levels, with escalators connecting them at the northwest entrance and escalators and glass lifts connecting them in the atrium, at the south of the centre. Unlike most of its contemporaries, the Marlands Shopping Centre does not contain a car park of any kind – the designated car park for the centre is accessed by going through Southampton's unusual ASDA supermarket which is on a slope – the supermarket's ground floor on the eastern side links to the car park's 10th floor on the western side.

=== West Quay Retail Park ===
The West Quay Retail Park is an out-of-town style retail park, but located within the city centre. It includes a number of large warehouse-style stores. The retail park also has a small food section and is also the location of Southampton's geothermal power plant. Southampton Coach Station is also located here.

=== Westquay Shopping Centre ===
Building work on Westquay began in 1997 as the former Daily Echo building, two large office blocks (Arundel Towers) and Pirelli Cable Works were demolished to make way for the centre. The centre was opened on 28 September 2000.

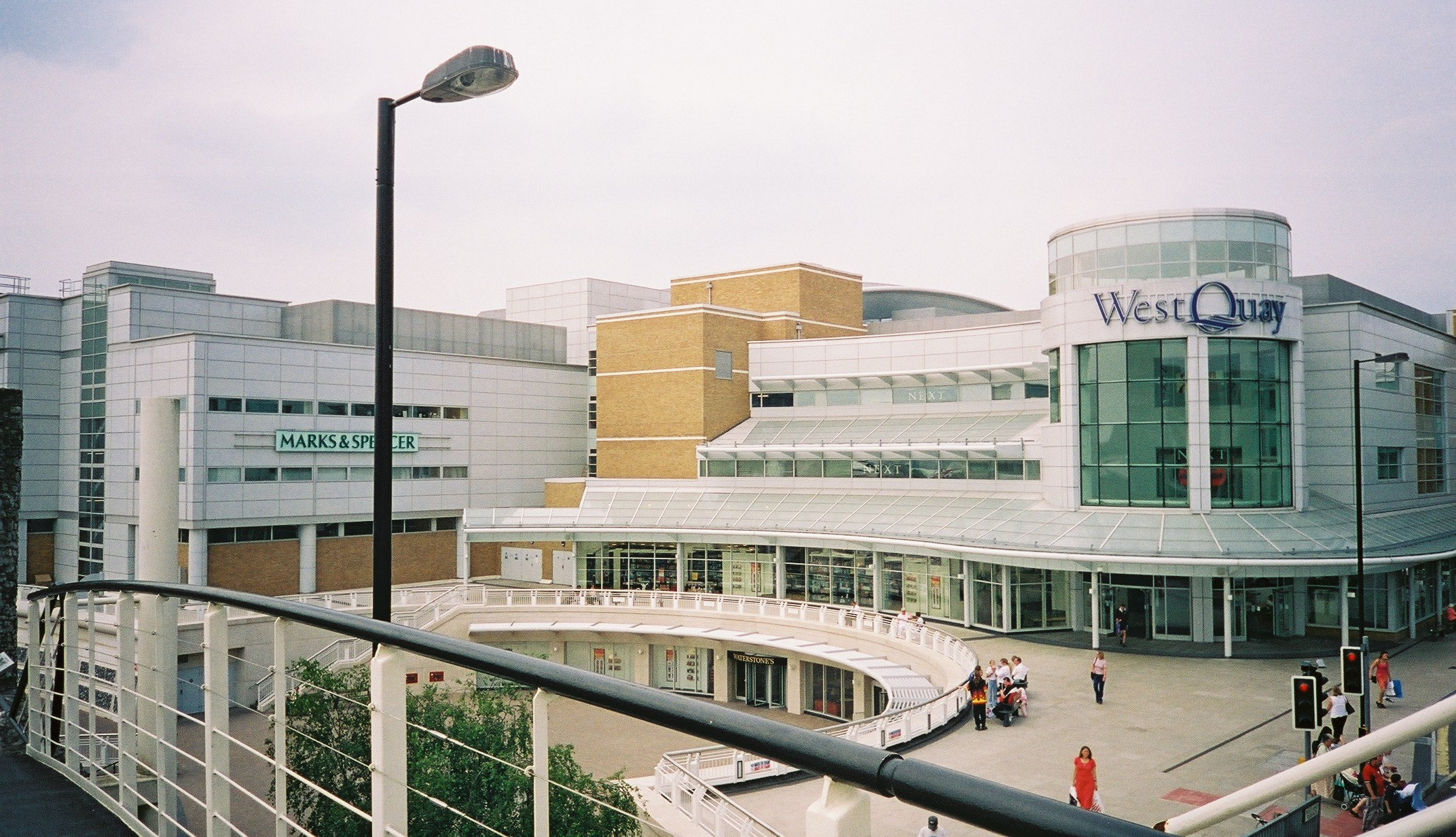
Westquay Mall, Southampton's newest and largest shopping centre

This shopping centre has an area of 800,000 square feet (70,000 m2) of retail space (74,000 m^{2}) and contains around a hundred shop units. Some years after the original shopping centre opened, an additional development - initially known as Watermark WestQuay - was added housing a leisure complex including a cinema and several restaurants.

== Transport ==
=== Buses ===
There are two main termini for bus services, these are Vincent Walk and Westquay/Albion Place. The city's main operator is Bluestar. Most services pass through Westquay/Albion Place and terminate at Vincents walk. However, services to the Waterside (Totton and Fawley) as well as Salisbury Reds services terminate at Westquay. Unilink also passes through the Westquay stops.

=== Coaches ===
There is a National Express coach station on the West Quay retail park, a short walk from the railway station.

=== Ferry ===
Ferry services operate along Southampton Water to Hythe and Cowes, from Town Quay. These are operated by Red Funnel.

=== Train ===
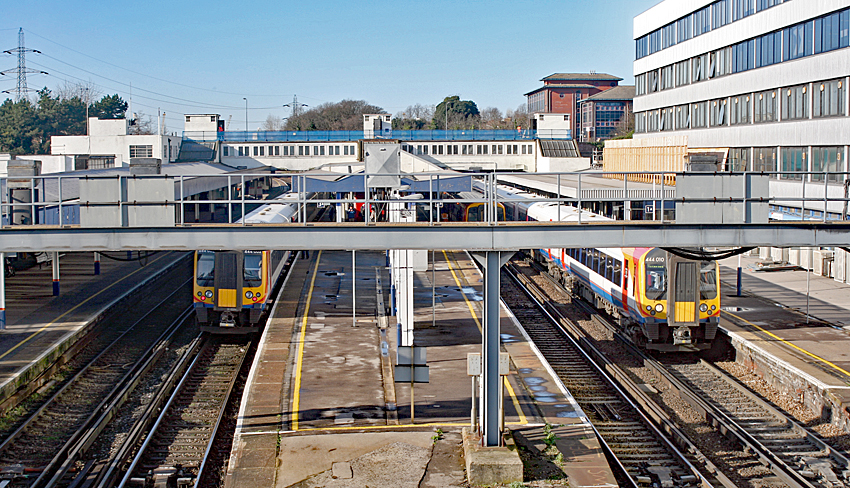
Platforms at Southampton Central station

Southampton Central railway station is located in the north west of the city centre area, with the old Southern Terminus in the south east. The station is on the South West Main Line, with it seeing frequent services to the local area as well as London and Manchester. The station is operated by South Western Railway.

== Waterfront ==
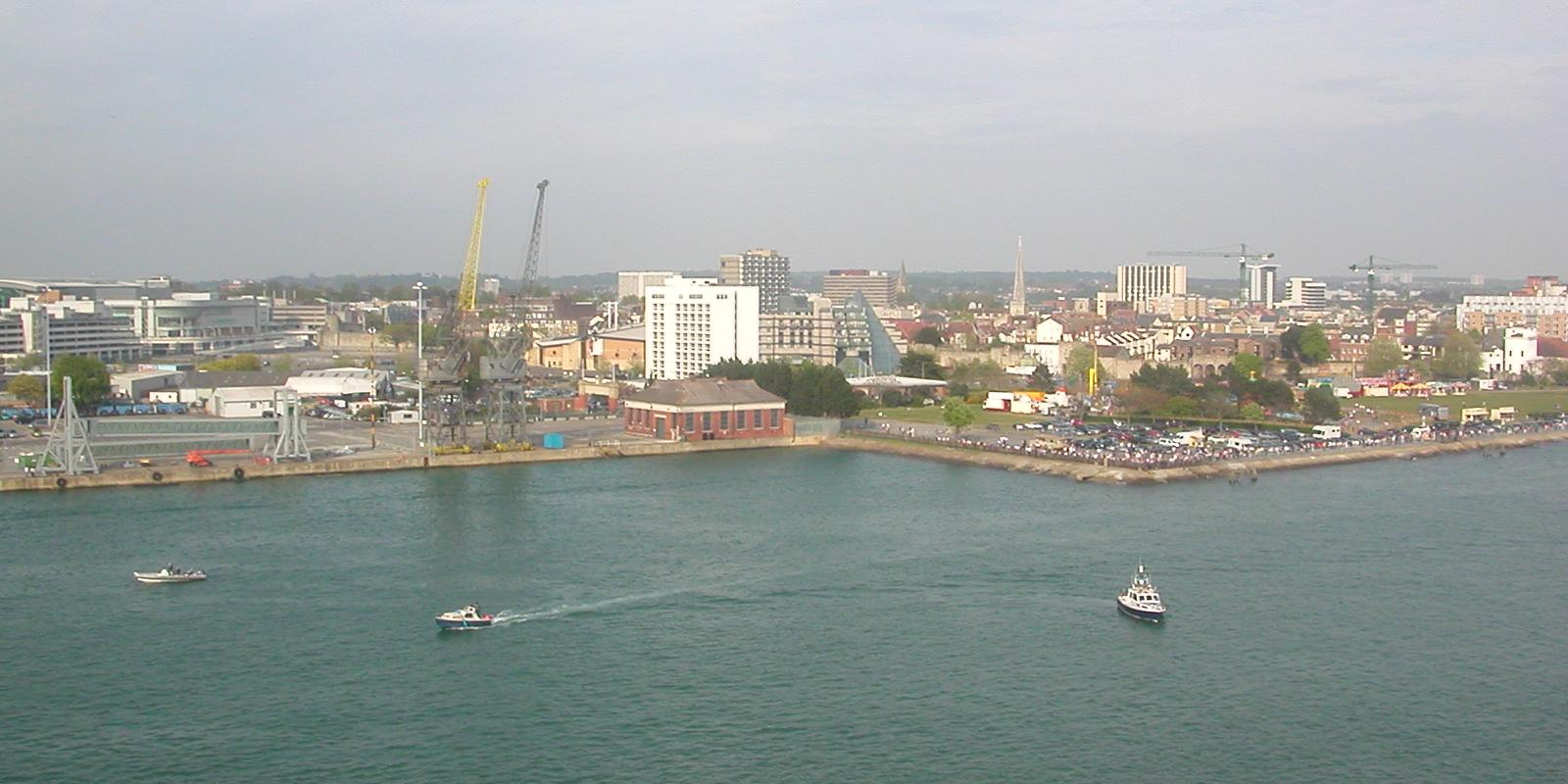
Part of the waterfront. The Westquay shopping centre can be seen on the left, with the spires of St Mary's and St Michael's churches. Spectators line the shores of Mayflower Park.
