= Bowling green =

Finely manacured turf

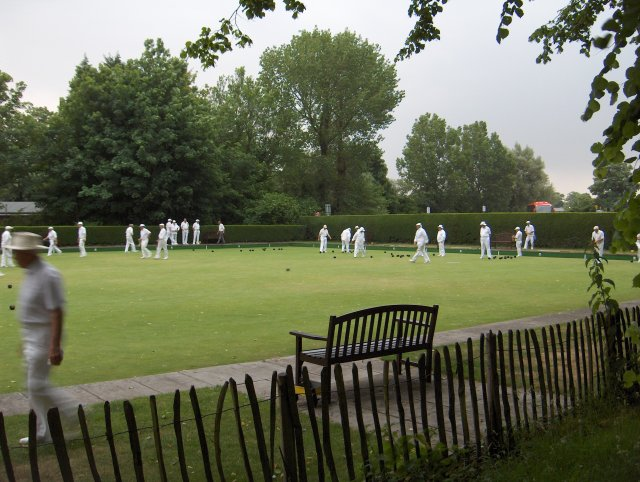
A bowling green

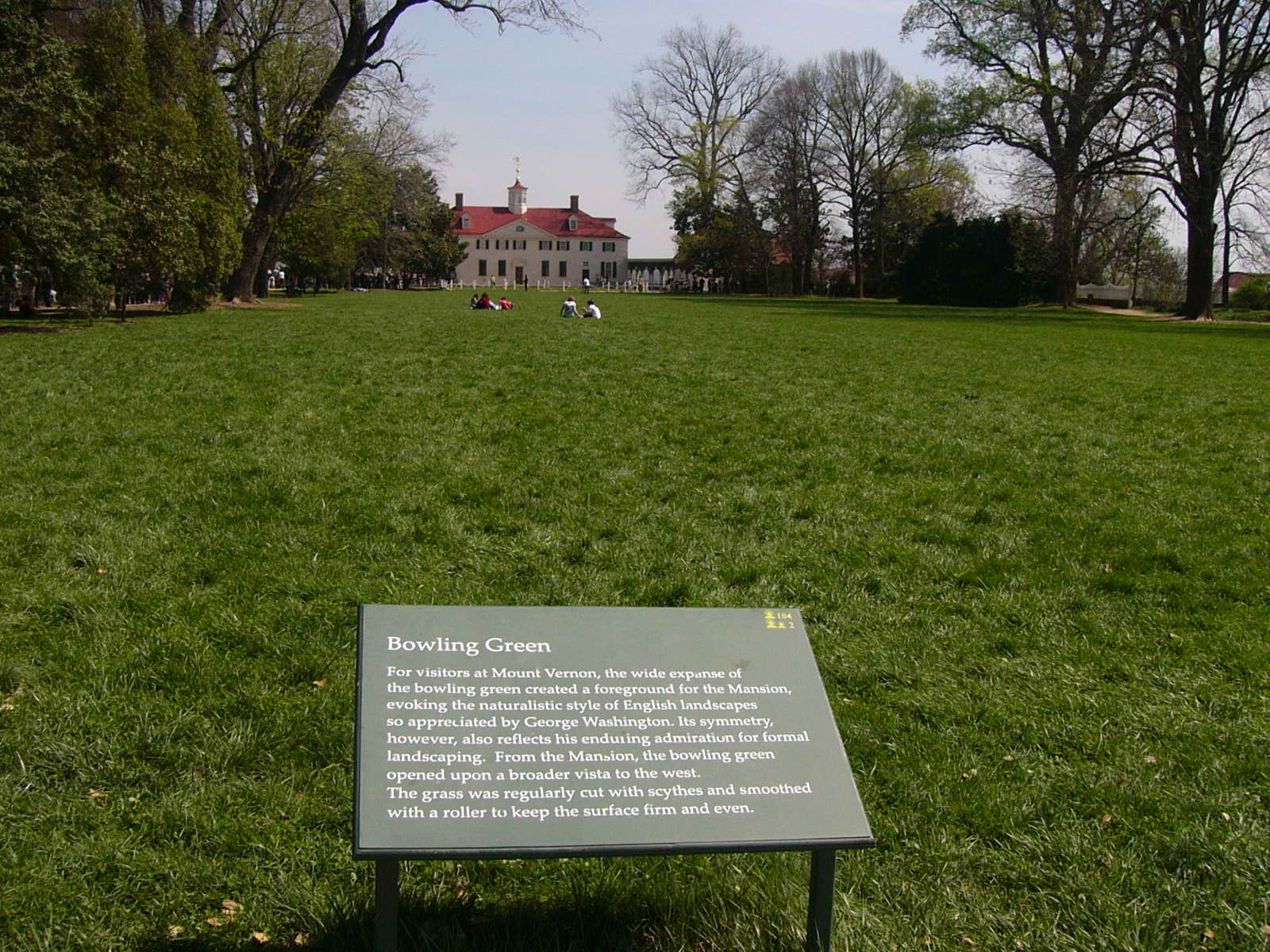
Bowling green in front of Mount Vernon (home of George Washington), with historical explanation

A bowling green is a finely laid, close-mown and rolled stretch of turf for playing the game of bowls.

Before 1830, when Edwin Beard Budding of Thrupp, near Stroud, England, invented the lawnmower, lawns were often kept cropped by grazing sheep on them. The world's oldest surviving bowling green is the Southampton Old Bowling Green, which was first used in 1299.

When the French adopted "boulingrin" in the 17th century, it was understood to mean a sunk geometrically shaped piece of perfect grass, framed in gravel walks, which often formed the centre of a regularly planted wood called a bosquet, somewhat like a highly formalized glade; it might have a central pool or fountain.

The diarist Samuel Pepys relates a conversation he had with the architect Hugh May:

Then walked to Whitehall, where saw nobody almost, but walked up and down with Hugh May, who is a very ingenious man. Among other things, discoursing of the present fashion of gardens to make them plain, that we have the best walks of gravell in the world, France having none, nor Italy; and our green of our bowling allies is better than any they have.

== Dimensions and other specifications ==
Bowling green specifications for the lawn bowls variation of the sport are stipulated in World Bowls' Laws of the Sport of Bowls. For the variant known as crown green bowls, no such stipulation is documented by the national governing body and bowls clubs are free to form the dimensions and other specifications as they feel fit. Generally a "crown green" has just that: a crown or raised centre section with the outer edges of the green dropping off towards the surrounding ditch. Other greens are generally as level as possible.

Several games of bowls can be played on a bowling green at the same time. The number of games depends on the dimensions of the green. Each game is played on its own portion of the green. These divided portions of the green are called rinks.

The length of a green in the direction of play will be between 31 metres and 40 metres. The green should have a suitable level playing surface made of grass or of an approved synthetic material.

The green is surrounded by a ditch between 200 millimetres and 380 millimetres wide, and between 50 millimetres and 200 millimetres deep. The ditch has a bank against its outer edge. The top of the bank should be at least 230 millimetres above the surface level of the green.

Generally, greens are built in a square shape as close to 40 metres as possible. This allows for games to be played in either direction. The advantages of playing in different directions are that: the wear on the green is more even, and; the players do not need to face towards the sun when playing.

In cities, where outdoor space is limited, greens are rarely 40 metres in length (they are generally still square, however).

It is not unusual to find greens that are rectangular in shape. On rectangular greens games are played in one direction only. The length of a rectangular green is still between 31 metres and 40 metres. The width can vary from as little as 8 metres (enough for one rink) to as much as 60 metres or more.

The width of a rink for outdoor play will be between 4.3 metres and 5.8 metres (for indoor play the minimum width of a rink is 4.6 metres). The centre line of the rink can be marked along the surface of the green starting at 2 metres from each end ditch. The side boundaries of each rink are shown by boundary pegs. The side boundary of the outside rink (also called a ditch rink) should be at least 600 millimetres from the side ditch (460 millimetres for indoor greens).
