= God's House Hospital =

Almshouse in Southampton, England

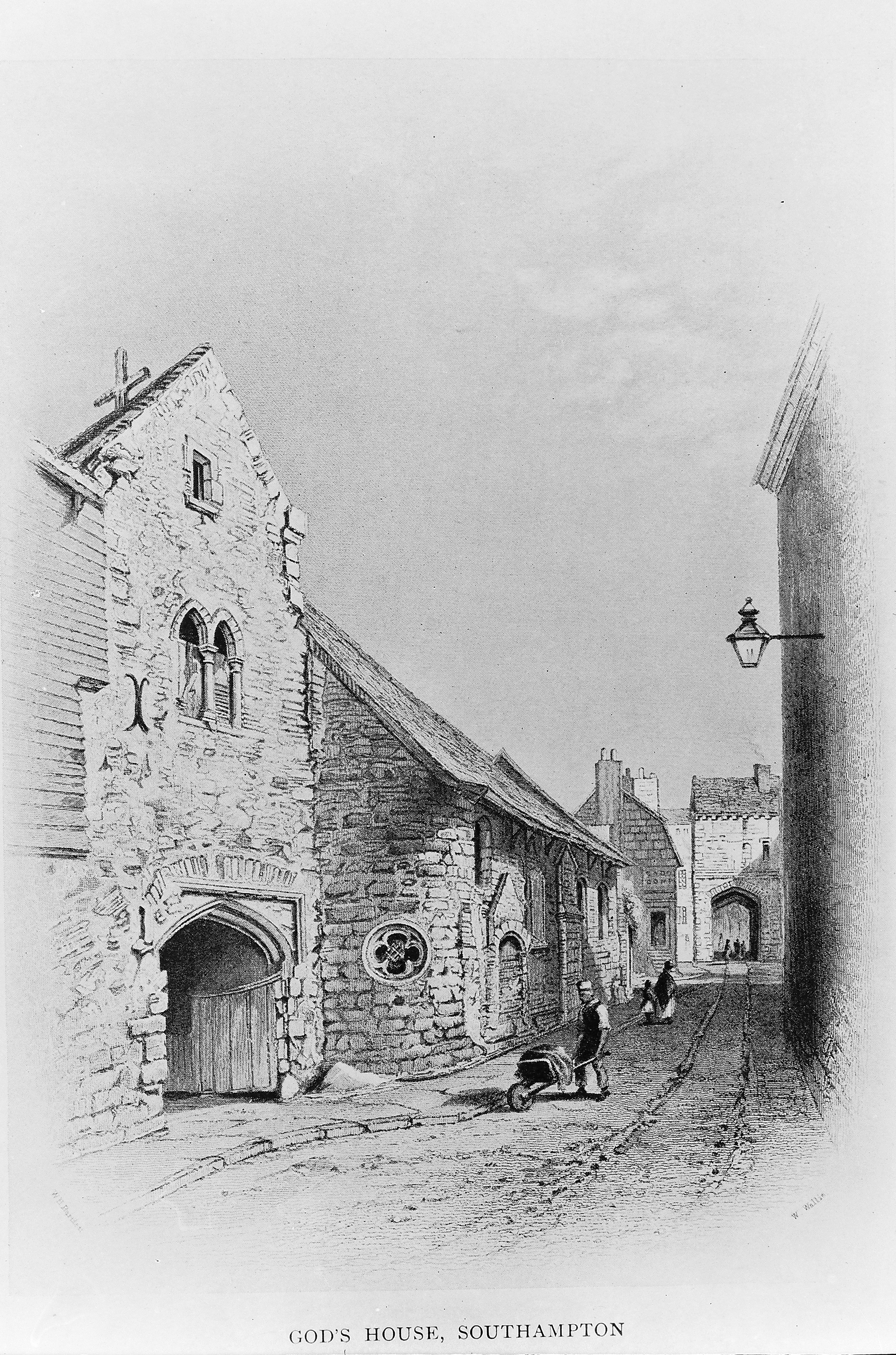

- Shown in Southampton
- Alternative names: Domus Dei, Maison Dieu, God's House Hospice

General information
- Location: Southampton
- Coordinates: 50°53′49″N 1°24′11″W
- Construction started: 12th century

God's House Hospital, also known as the Hospital of St. Julian or Domus Dei (Latin for "God's House") is a refuge for poor travellers in Southampton, England. Much of the complex has now been destroyed, with only four buildings remaining: the gatehouse, God's House Tower, a grade I listed scheduled ancient monument; and the chapel, St. Julien's Church, a grade I listed building; and two accommodation blocks dating from the 19th century.

The hospital was founded in the 12th century by Gervase le Riche, burgess and portreeve of Southampton, and in the 14th century it was granted to The Queen's College, Oxford on condition that the college continued to maintain the hospital and meet its original objectives. The college replaced the original buildings in the 19th century and still own the hospital buildings and the chapel.

== History ==
=== Foundation ===
The Hospice, or Hospital of God's House – Domus Dei or Maison Dieu – was founded in the latter half of the 12th century by Gervase (or Gervaise) le Riche, burgess and portreeve (port warden) of Southampton. In the Norman or Mediaeval Latin of that period, he is named Praepositus de Sudhanton. Gervase le Riche had one brother, Roger (possibly a twin), who was the first warden of God's House. The reasons for le Riche's decision to found the hospital are not known. John Leland reported that the hospital was founded on the site of the founder's home. As port warden, le Riche would be likely to live near the port; his house would have opened directly onto the harbour, at a time when there was no wall running along Winkle Street from the Water Gate to God's House Gateway. He would step out of his house, through the wicket-gate, at once upon a pier or quay, against which the waters lapped at high tide, and where the official vessel awaited him for embarkation. Behind, and at the side of his house, along the present High Street, and up to Gloucester Square, stretched the garden and orchards. Nearby, at the other side, lay the Bowling Green.

The resident members of the hospital consisted of a custos or warden, two or more priests, three or more brethren, some ten sisters, three or more poor men and women — who were to make themselves generally useful according to their health and strength. Besides these, there were various officials and servants necessary for so large an establishment, such as cook, barber surgeon, laundress, dairymaid, cowherd, shepherd, brewer, and swineherd. There appears to have been a large body of men, partially non-resident, who, acting as under-stewards, managed the various properties of the hospital, and had to give account thereof to the warden. Attached to the establishment also were others, non-resident, living on the various farms and manors, and being unpaid, subsisted on the produce of the land which they tilled. The "sisters" and other females were expected to make themselves useful by nursing the sick, and offering frequent prayers. They received a farthing per day for clothing, and an extra payment for exceptional acts and duties, such as abstaining from meat for a certain period. The "brethren" were also not allowed to be idle; but, when not required at home, were sent to look after the interests of the establishment at its various tenements and farms, as occasion might require.

The "brethren and sisters" were also to receive the travellers, wayfarers, and pilgrims, on their embarkation and debarkation, or on their journey generally, to wait upon them in the refectory, and to tend them, if sick, in the infirmary. Lepers, however, appear to have been excluded from the latter building, as there was a special leper hospital already in existence, founded by the burgesses, and dedicated to St. Mary Magdalene, where the Marlands Shopping Centre is now situated. Special directions were laid down for religious acts including amongst others the recitation of the Lord's Prayer by the "brethren and sisters" 180 times a day. The Bishop of Winchester was initially made patron of the hospital, however patronage subsequently passed to the monarch. The pauper portion of the community received, besides their food, one farthing every two days. They were, however, allowed to make additions to this munificent sum by engaging in extra employment. Thus one became a gatekeeper, another helped at harvest time to reap corn, a third assisted at some menial work, and at the end of the year was presented with two pairs of shoes.

For the maintenance of the hospital the founder bestowed on it grants of land, farms, manors and messuages which were subsequently supplemented by further bequests made by royal and other donors. Some of these lands lay in the neighbourhood of God's House while other landed property was situated further afield — at Stoneham, West End, Botley, also in Portsmouth, Dorset, and the Isle of Wight.

=== Royal grants and protection ===
Although God's House was founded a few years before the death of Henry II of England, there is no mention of the Hospital or Grevase le Riche in correspondence relating to that king. However, his successor, Richard I granted lands to the Hospital shortly after its foundation. He then subsequently granted land at Gussage in Dorset to the hospital, including not just the farm but the farmer, Turstinus, and "all his following" ("Turstinus et tota sequela sua") – meaning his family, labourers, stock, agricultural implements, goods, and chattels.

Richard also took the Hospital under his protection, with the order:

Suscipimus etiam in custodia et protectione nostra eandem Domum prohibentes firmiter ne quis ei aut hominibus suis aliquam faciat injuriam aut molestiam aut gravamen (We also take under our guardianship and protection the aforesaid house forbidding under severe penalties any one to bring harm, or trouble, or inconvenience to it or its people.)

King John made a grant of further lands at Gussage to Gervase le Riche, and made a further declaration of protection:

We take under our care, protection, and guardianship the Hospital of Suthamtone, its brethren, lands, people, affairs, accounts, and all its possessions; and we promise to hold, guard, and protect the aforesaid house with all that appertains to it, as though it were our own royal demesne

In addition to these royal grants and declarations of protection, William de Redvers, the Earl of Devon from 1196 to 1216 made a grant of land from "Werrore" near Carisbrooke to "Pukeflunt, Northwde, Medina, and Tintesflun".

=== Queen's College ===
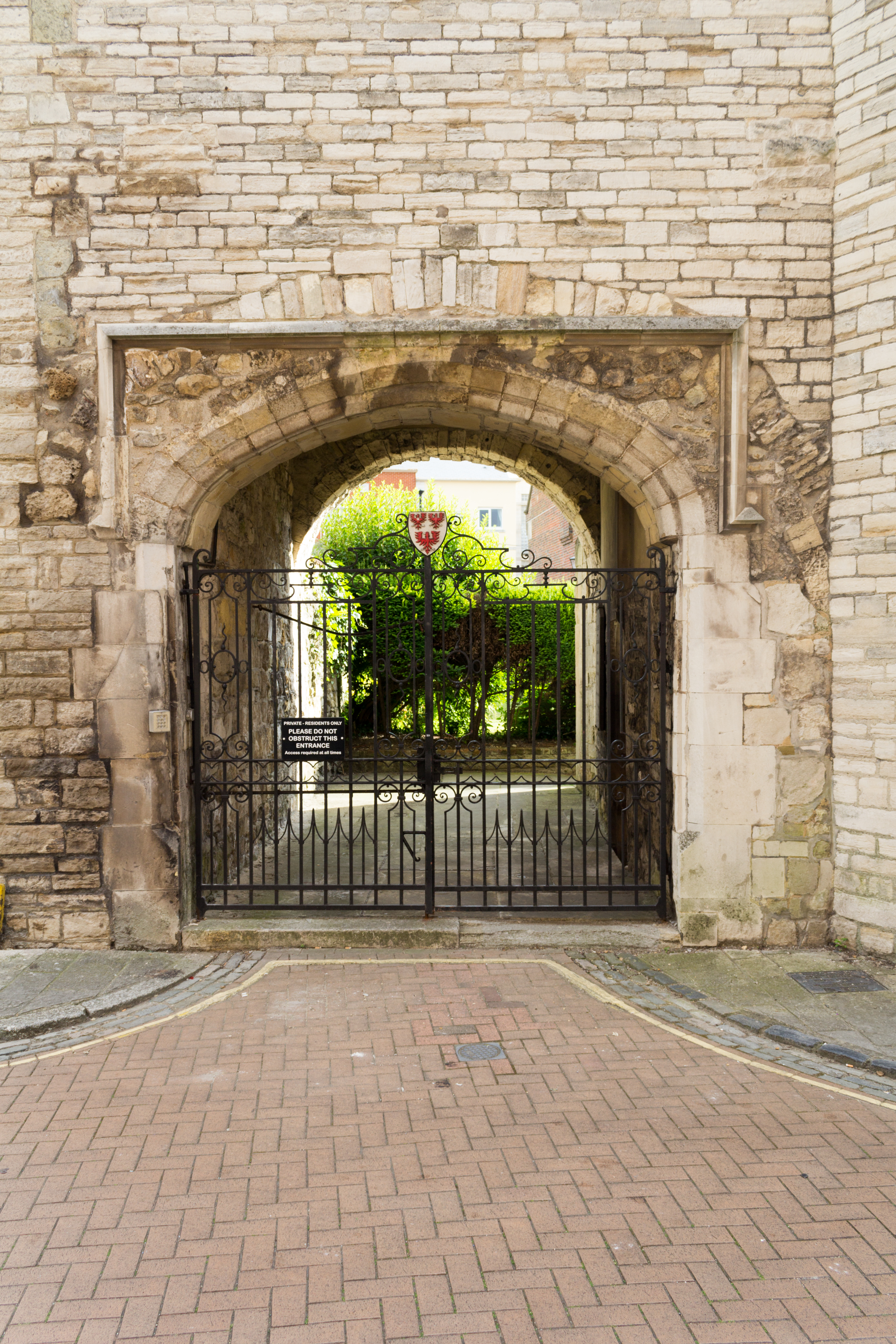
Residents' entrance to the almshouses. Above the gate is the arms of The Queen's College, Oxford.

In 1343, King Edward III granted the custody of God's House to The Queen's College, Oxford, which had been founded two years earlier. This charter transferred ownership of the hospital and all the related properties to the college on condition that the provost and scholars at the college continued to meet the hospital's original objectives, and allowed any surplus funds to be spent on providing accommodation for any students of the college who suffered from long-term or incurable illnesses.

Edward III's successors continued to favour the hospital. Richard II absolved it from the payment of taxes known as "tenths and fifteenths". Queen Margaret of Anjou, wife of Henry VI, and her retinue were accommodated at God's House. Edward IV, whose grandfather was buried in the chapel, separated a number of religious establishments in England from French monasteries and instead affiliated them to God's House Hospital. These included Sherborne Abbey in Dorset and the manors of Upton Grey and Chineham in north Hampshire.

Because the hospital was affiliated to the college and not the Catholic church at the time of the dissolution of the monasteries in the 16th century, it escaped confiscation under Henry VIII.

During the reign of Elizabeth I, the Huguenots, a sizable French Protestant group, were facing heavy prosecution in their homeland and many sought sanctuary in Protestant England, including port cities such as Southampton. The group were allowed to use the God's House chapel - St. Julian's Church - with regular services apparently beginning on 21 December 1567, with a congregation that day of 85 people. The regular use of the chapel by the Huguenots led to it becoming known by its alternative name, the French Church, and the building today is generally referred to using the French spelling - St. Julien's - as opposed to the original St Julian's.

The college demolished the hospital's original domestic buildings in 1861, replacing them with two blocks, each of which could accommodate four people. Men were housed in the eastern block and women in the northern block. At the same time, the college carried out restoration work to the gateway (God's House Tower) and the chapel (St Julien's Church).

In September 1906 the college was continuing to meet the condition of operating the facility as an almshouse and there were eight residents. As of 2021 the buildings are still owned by the college and are used to accommodate retired former staff. The almshouse continues to be managed by a charity, Sadler's Gift For God's House, of which the single trustee is listed as the "provost and scholars at Queens College". Since at least 2016 the charity's income and expenditure match, with a figure of £480 for the 2019-20 financial year. In contrast, the funds held by Queens College as at 31 July 2021 amounted to almost £420 million.

== Description ==
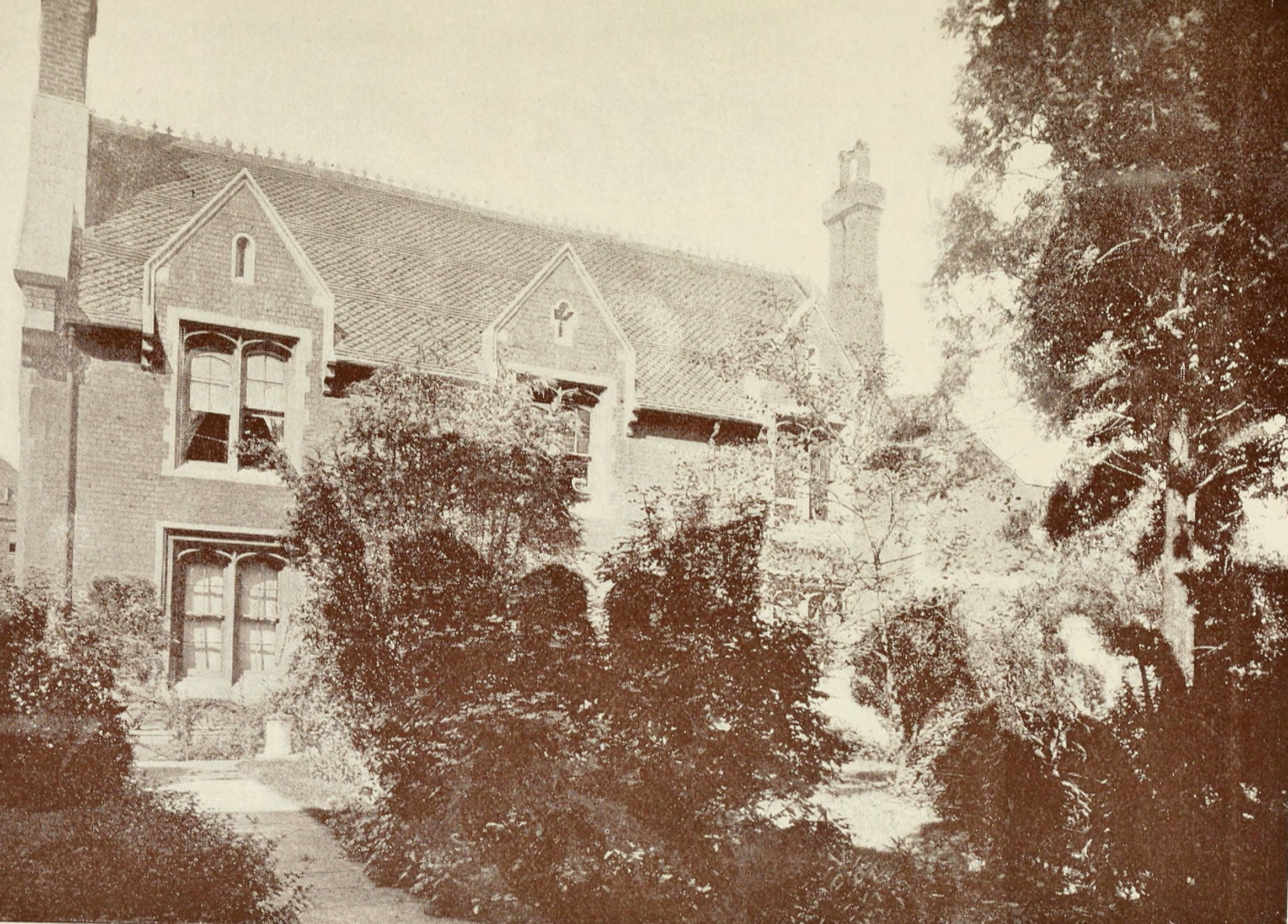
Residence of the sisters, God's House Hospital, Southampton

In 1894 the buildings were described as forming a small quadrangle with a lawn and trees in the centre. On the north side lay the residences of the "sisters" (four under one roof). Exactly opposite, on the south side, was the chapel. The warden's house, on the west, faced the "brothers'" residences on the east – the latter being an exact counterpart of those of the "sisters".

However, in its earlier days the hospital stretched out behind the Warden's House, along the High Street, and up to Gloucester Square, where in ancient times was a friary of Franciscan Minorites, from which the God's House domain was separated by a mound of earth. Here stood the refectory, the kitchen, and the infirmary buildings. There would also have been a graveyard or cemetery, though no traces of it have been found.

The warden's house was long and narrow with a garden attached. By 1894 it had been converted into two separate dwellings, leased to tenants unconnected with the hospital, and a solid iron railing separated it from the quadrangle.

The residences of the brethren and sisters consisted each of one sitting-room, one bedroom, and a small kitchen or scullery, and were described as affording "ample room and a comfortable home for one person". The two residential blocks were identical, with two sets of rooms are on the ground floor an intermediate staircase ascending to the two sets over them. The four brethren and four sisters occupied the residences, free of rent, rates, taxes, and repairs. The whole institution was supervised by a chaplain appointed by Queen's College, usually one of the clergy of Southampton. The chaplain did not reside at God's House.

In 1894 there was a blocked up Norman doorway exactly opposite the west door of the chapel, the entrance to some previous large building, whose site was occupied by coal cellars.

=== Chapel ===
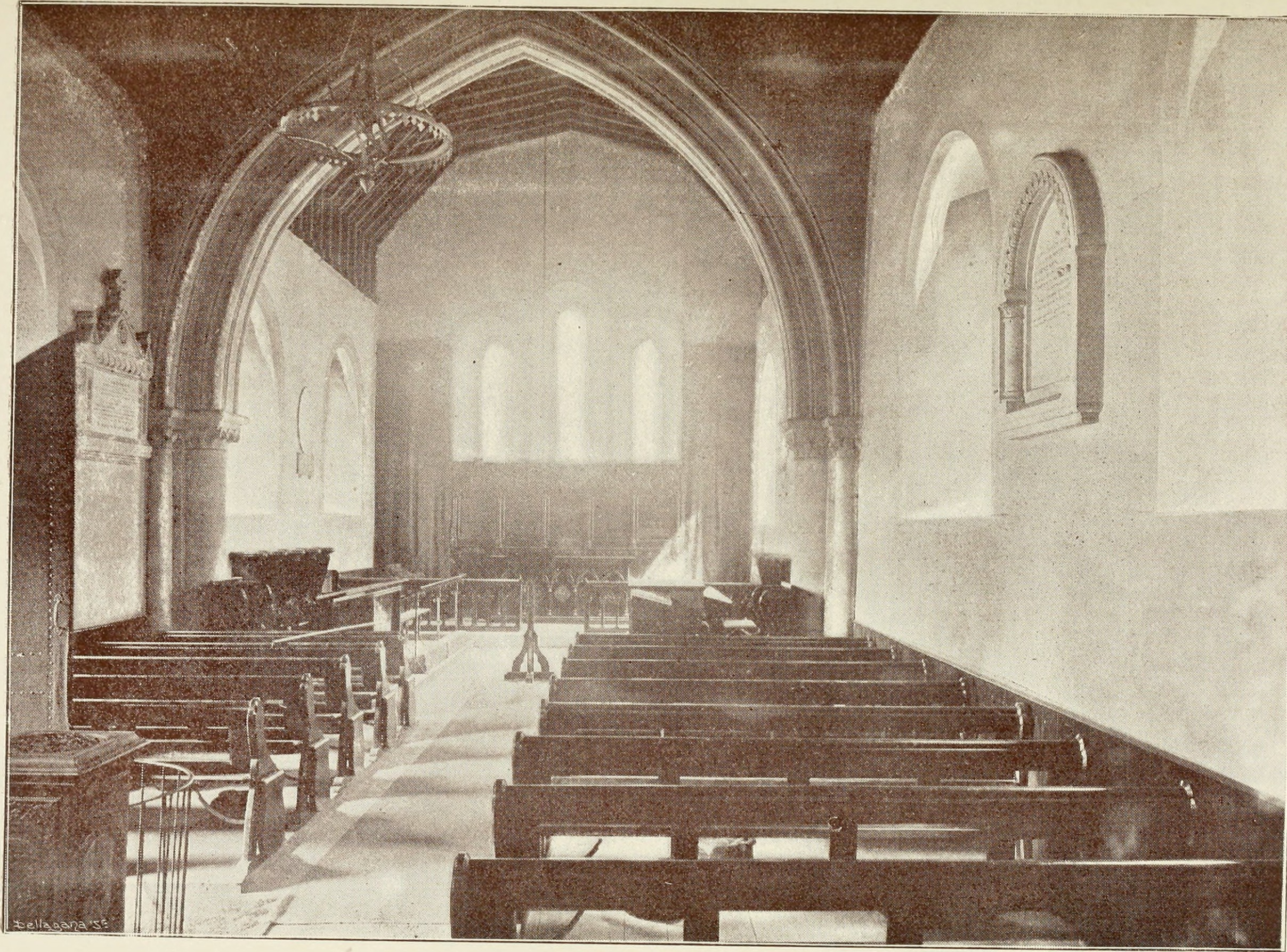
Interior of God's House Chapel, c. 19th century

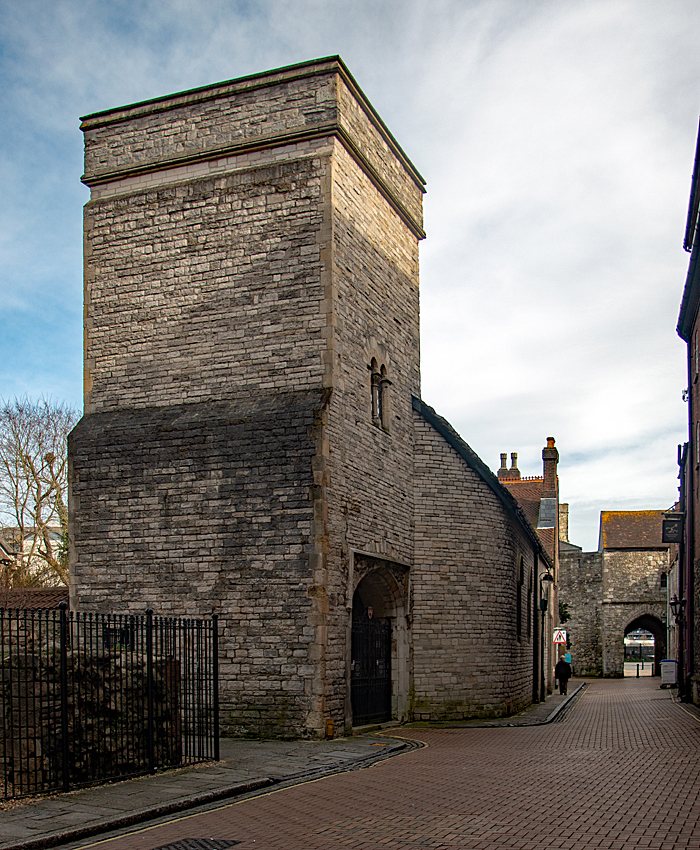
St Julien's church, Southampton, 2017

The chapel, dedicated to St. Julian, the patron saint of travellers and wayfarers, was rebuilt with the pensioners' residences in 1861. It was restored on the foundations of the old chapel; but a breast-high quatrefoil insertion, in the southwest corner of the old chapel, outside the gate-tower and through which a view of the interior could be obtained without entering it, was not repeated in the restored portion.

The chapel is 60 feet (18 m) long by about 20 feet (6.1 m) wide, lighted by plain Norman windows, having a chancel arch of the Early English Period, as it was verging on to the decorative style of architecture. The reredos and altar that were present in 1894 were placed there with permission of the college by members of the French Protestant congregation, to whom most of the furniture belonged. With one exception, all the tablets were in memory of French pastors, who from the days of the Huguenots had ministered there.

A brass fastened to a mahogany slab, about 3 feet (0.91 m) long, with a head of alabaster attached, was stated to be the figure of Wallerand Thevelin, one of the French ministers in 1584. However Henry March Gilbert remarked that "the dress points to a much earlier period, and it no doubt represents one of the priests or chaplains of the 13th or 14th century".

There is a small head, carved in stone, over the (inside of) west door. The west door was added to the old chapel in 1299, subsequently closed, and was re-opened about in the mid to late 19th century for the better accommodation of the worshippers. Until then there had been only one entrance to the chapel, on the north side, from the quadrangle.

Outside, in the southeast corner of the quadrangle, there were remains of the old chapel, believed to have been taken from St. Julian's at its restoration in 1861.

=== Almshouses and other buildings ===
The two blocks of almshouses are grade II listed buildings, listed separately as 1-4 Winkle Street and 5-8 Winkle Street. In addition, the wall in the northeast corner of the quadrangle is also grade II listed. The wall is believed to date to the 12th century and is possibly part of the original hospital building.

== Sources ==
This article incorporates text from A brief and popular history of the Hospital of God's House by John Aston Whitlock, which is in the public domain.
