= Southampton Old Bowling Green =

World's oldest surviving bowling green

Coordinates: 50°53′49.2″N 1°24′7.2″W

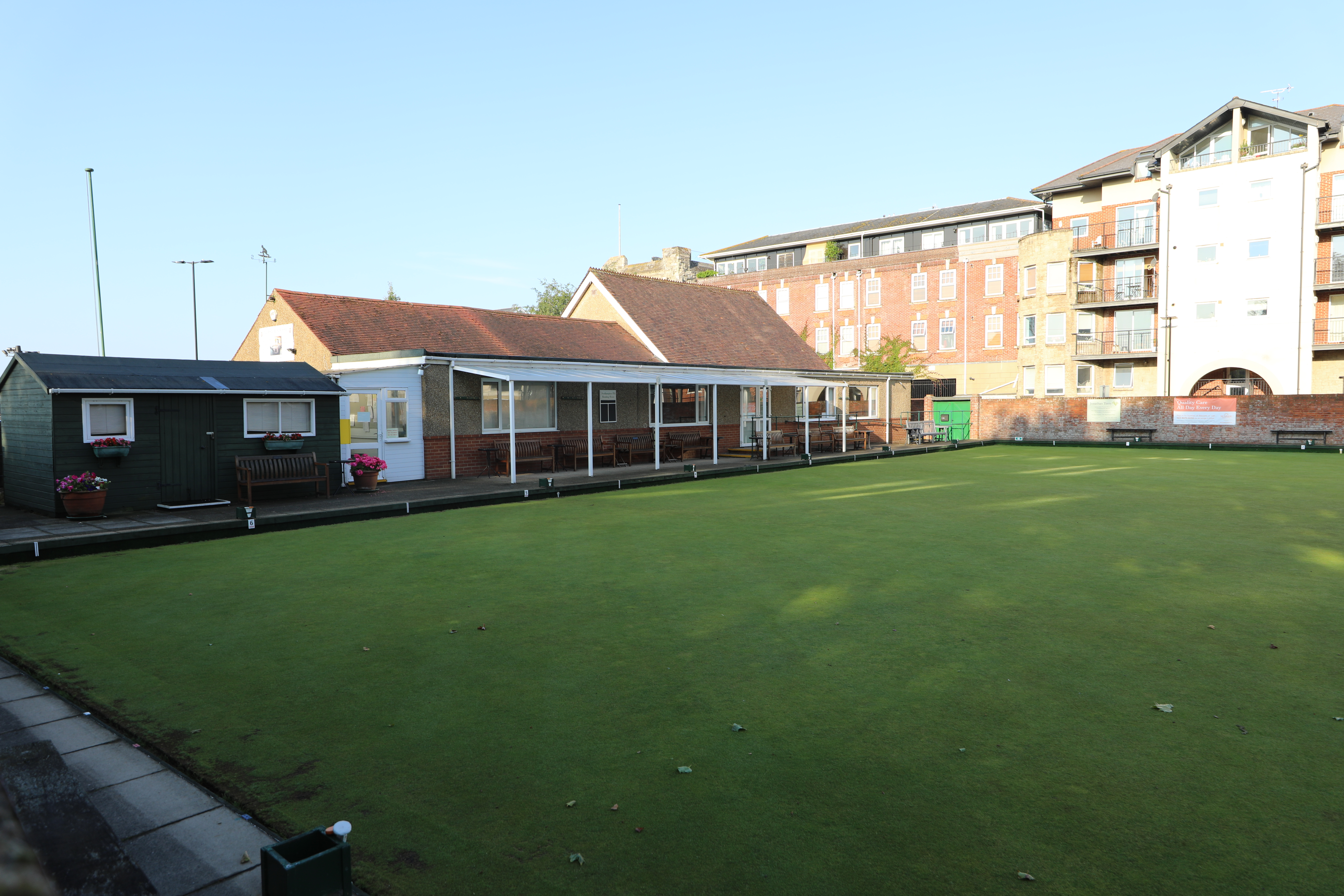
Southampton Old Bowling Green

Southampton Old Bowling Green, situated on the corner of Lower Canal Walk and Platform Road, Southampton, England, claims to be the world's oldest surviving bowling green. It was first used in 1299.

== History ==
The Hospital of "God's House" was founded in 1185 for pilgrims who were going either to the shrine of St Swithun at Winchester or to Canterbury; until 2011, the gateway housed the museum of archaeology.

The green adjoining the God's House Hospital had been established during the reign of Richard I the Lionheart for the recreational use of the Warden, and was first used for a game of bowls in 1299.

The club that plays there now is believed to have been established in the 17th century because of the history of a competition known as the "Knighthood". It is also the only club that has a "Master" in charge, a title carried forward from the earliest of days.

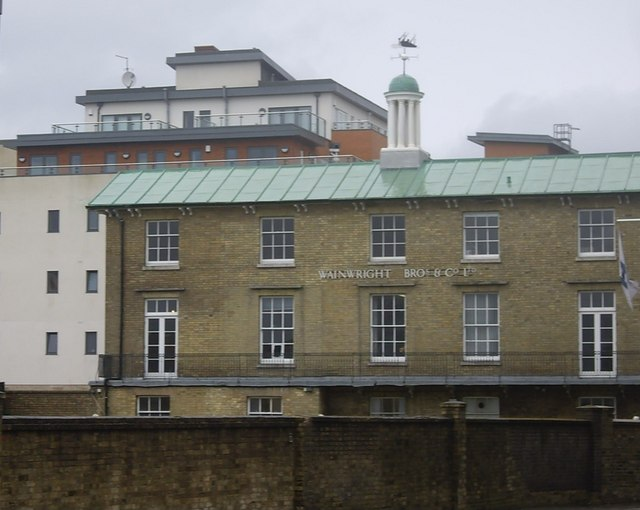
Bowling Green House

Bowling Green House, now occupied by Wainwright Bros. (shipping agency) and the Consulate Of The Federal Republic Of Germany, is a Grade II listed building. Built in the mid-19th century, it is a three-storey brick building with a green slate roof with a central cupola on eight Tuscan columns, surmounted by a steep weather-vane.

== The Knighthood ==
A unique occurrence called the "Knighthood" competition is held annually when the members (gentlemen commoners) compete to obtain 7 points, with the winner being awarded the title of "Knight-of-the-green" and becoming a sir (in lower case). The competition is adjudicated by the members who have previously won the competition (Knights), who adjudicate in top hats and frocked tails suits. Those who win are excluded from future Knighthood competitions.

This is the annual competition of the club with rules which are different from the normal variant of the game.

The competition used to start on 1 August but now starts on the third Wednesday of the month and is open to all members of the club, except the pre-existing knights.

The game is played "roving jack" style in that the jack is placed on a penny anywhere on the green. Each player takes it in turns to bowl his two bowls at the jack. Each bowl when it comes to rest is measured and the distance from the jack is recorded before the bowl is removed. If a bowl moves the jack, the jack is placed back on the penny before it is measured. If the penny is partially covered by the bowl it is a toucher, if totally covered it is a lodger. After all the players have bowled the player with the closest bowl is awarded one point. If he also has the second nearest he scores two. The jack is then reset at a different position and the game continues until somebody has scored seven points.

The winner is made a "knight-of-the-green" and can never enter this competition again. It is a rarity for the knight to be declared on the first day and the competition has been known to last ten days.

=== Past knights ===
Amongst the past winners of the competition was the former Burnley and Southampton footballer Tom Nicol, who won the 133rd championship in 1907.
