= Besa: The Promise =

- Directed by: Rachel Goslins
- Produced by: JWM Productions
- Starring: Norman H. Gershman; Rexhep Hoxha
- Narrated by: Norman H. Gershman
- Cinematography: Neil Barrett
- Edited by: Christine S. Romero
- Release date: 2012
- Running time: 86 minutes
- Country: United States
- Languages: English; Albanian; Hebrew

Besa: The Promise is a documentary film, produced by JWM Productions and directed by Rachel Goslins.

The film follows Norman H. Gershman, an American photographer as he travels to Albania, a mostly Muslim country, interviewing and photographing families who rescued Jews during World War II. Along the way Gershman meets Rexhep Hoxha, a Muslim shopkeeper. Hoxha seeks to fulfill a promise made by his father to the Jewish family they sheltered during Nazi occupation. With Gershman's help, Hoxha embarks on a journey across cultural and religious divides to return a set of mysterious books written in Hebrew to the original owners. On his quest, Hoxha discovers the unknown story of his father's astonishing act of bravery and selflessness.

Filmed in Albania, Bulgaria, Israel, and the United States, more than twenty in-depth interviews were conducted with survivors, rescuers and other witnesses. The film is based on Gershman's photo series and book, Besa, Muslims Who Saved Jews in WWII.
