= Southampton Terminus railway station =

Former railway station in England

Coordinates: 50°53′52″N 1°23′47″W

Southampton Terminus
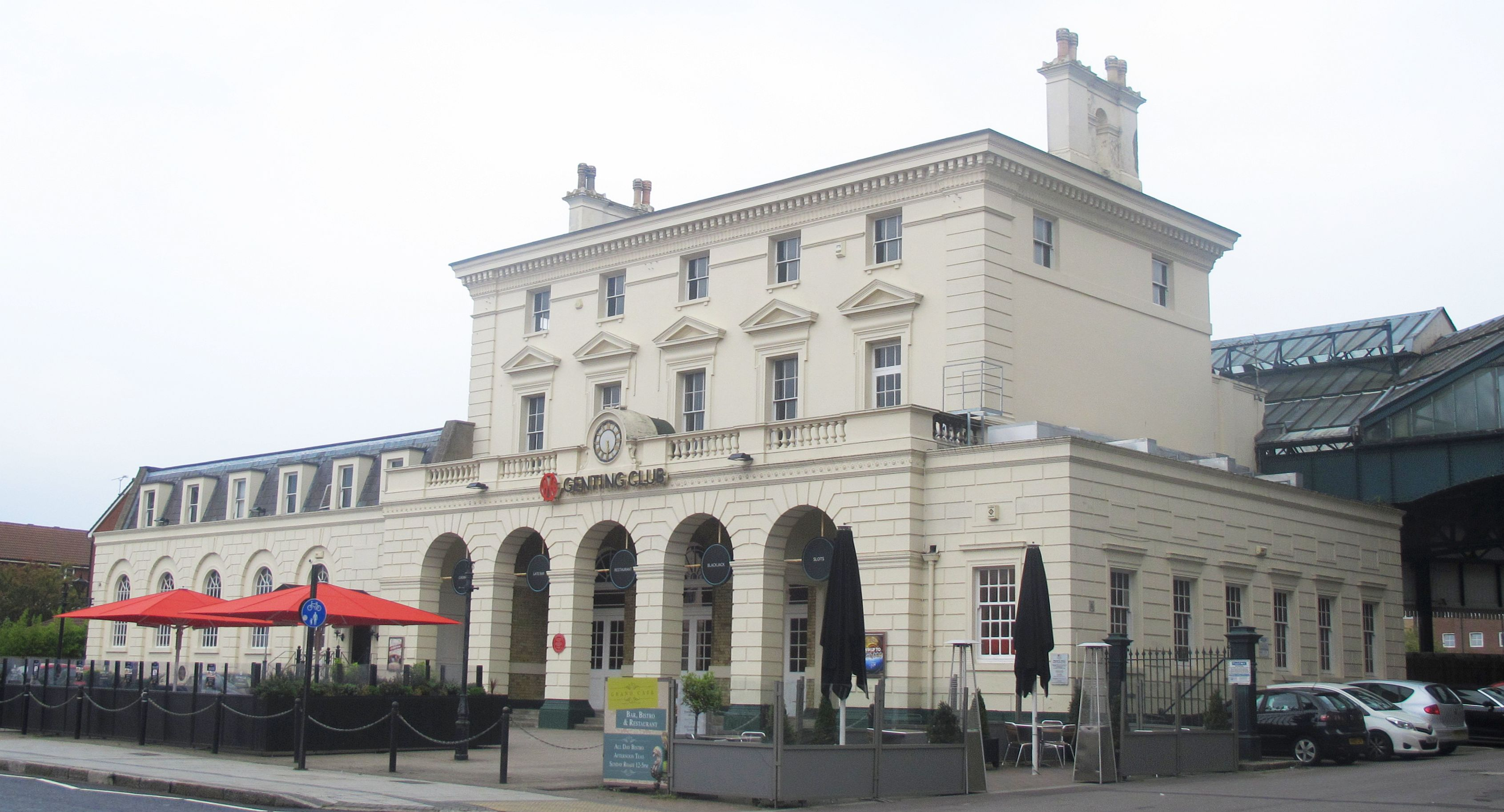
- Terminus Station, now a casino

General information
- Location: Southampton, City of Southampton; England
- Grid reference: SU425110
- Platforms: 6

Other information
- Status: Disused

History
- Original company: London and Southampton Railway
- Pre-grouping: London & South Western Railway
- Post-grouping: Southern Railway

Key dates
- 11 May 1840: opened as Southampton
- July 1858: Renamed to Southampton Docks
- Sept 1896: Renamed to Southampton Town & Docks
- Nov 1912: Renamed to Southampton Town for Docks
- 9 July 1923: Renamed to Southampton Terminus (for Docks)
- 5 Sep 1966: Closed to passengers
- Dec 1967: Closed to freight
Location

Southampton Terminus railway station served the Port of Southampton and Southampton City Centre, England from 1840 until 1966. The station was authorised on 25 July 1834 and built as the terminus of the London and Southampton Railway, which later changed its name to the London and South Western Railway (LSWR). The station opened as "Southampton" on 11 May 1840 due to the track not being fully linked between Winchester and Basingstoke.

The station building was constructed in 1839–40 to the design of Sir William Tite. The LSWR added the much larger South Western Hotel building, designed by John Norton, in 1872. The line was extended into the Ocean Dock Terminal to allow boat trains to terminate on the quayside.

== History ==
=== Construction ===
A station for Southampton was authorised on 25 July 1834. The main building was designed by Sir William Tite in the Italianate style, which was popular at the time for railway architecture (see Chester which was built contemporaneously to Southampton). The building is now a Grade II* listed building.

The station building, which would be the terminus of the London and Southampton Railway, was the first to open in the city. It opened on 11 May 1840, due to the track not being fully linked between Winchester and Basingstoke. During the building of the track between Winchester railway station and Basingstoke railway station, the London and Southampton Railway company changed its name to the London and South Western Railway (LSWR). Initially the station had two platforms and an engine shed.

The station did not originally handle passenger services because of a dispute over running rights. To overcome this, a small open platform at Northam Road was opened. Access was from Bridge Road level crossing which was demolished in 1882 when the new "Central Bridge" was built. This remains a major route into Southampton from Woolston; at both ends of the bridge are plaques dedicated to the railway.

In 1847 engine sheds and a turntable were built.

During July 1858 Southampton was renamed "Southampton Docks" to distinguish it from Southampton West station. During the 1860s, additional sidings and sheds were built, followed by the Imperial Hotel.

=== Expansion ===
More development took place during the early 1870s when land on the station's eastern side was purchased, which allowed the railway to expand. Much larger goods sidings, a telegraph office and buildings for shipping businesses were built. At the same time the platforms were extended.

The London and South Western Railway purchased more land during 1876, north of the terminus, and built new locomotive work sheds and a turntable. Three new platforms, two arranged as an island, were opened 1891. The goods and parcel yard which were located at St. Lawrence Road were improved.

In 1895 the old 1847 engine sheds were still heavily in use but as demand rose for goods, they were converted into a one-road depot for freight trains. The original turntable was replaced with an open turntable which had radiating roads, coal stage, water columns and crew bothy. Over the years the turntable was repeatedly improved and eventually became a 70-foot (21-metre) vacuum turntable, which was closed and removed in September 1966.

During September 1896 the station was again renamed to "Southampton Town & Docks", later changing to "Southampton Town for Docks" in November 1912 and finally being renamed to "Southampton Terminus" on 9 July 1923.

In the early 1900s, Southampton Terminus saw increased traffic from locations such as Reading, Alton, London and Portsmouth; and by 1905 traffic from the Great Western Railway via the Didcot, Newbury and Southampton Railway.

Southampton Terminus is remembered for the many passengers of RMS Titanic who passed through it. Many of the ship's wealthy first class passengers stayed in the South Western Hotel before they boarded for their disastrous journey.

Two platforms were removed to accommodate a private road between the railway station and the hotel. To make the station more comfortable for its users, a glass canopy was erected in 1924. Two years later in 1926 a new parcel and mail office was built. Around this time the station platform numbers were reversed and numbered from to left to right.

=== Engine sheds ===
Motive power depots were situated at Southampton Terminus Station and nearby in Southampton Docks. The first of these was opened 10 June 1839 by the London and Southampton Railway, but was demolished due to track widening. This was replaced by another structure adjacent to the goods shed, but this was closed in 1895. It was replaced by an outdoor servicing facility north of the station, which included a turntable coal stage and offices. These remained open until 1966.

An engine shed was opened in Southampton Docks, by the Southampton Docks Railway Company in 1865. It was rebuilt in 1879, and taken over by the London and South Western Railway in 1892. The building was enlarged and re-roofed by the Southern Railway during the 1930s and rebuilt by British Railways in 1955. It was officially closed in January 1966, but remained in use until July 1967.

The Southern Railway opened an outdoor locomotive servicing facility in the New Docks in 1933 and added a turntable in 1949. This remained in use until 1966.

=== Hotel ===
Standing at the southern end of the station was the "Imperial Hotel", which was later renamed as "South Western Hotel".

During the Second World War, the hotel was acquired by the military and became HMS Shrapnel. Winston Churchill and Dwight Eisenhower reportedly discussed the Invasion of Normandy in one of the small public rooms on the first floor. Queen Elizabeth the Queen Mother also reportedly visited the hotel and danced in the Wedgwood Ballroom.

After the war it was renamed "South Western House" and was converted to offices. In 1961 the BBC opened a new BBC South region and used the former ballroom of the hotel as the main studio for their local news programme until 1991. The building was converted into private flats in 1998.

=== Closure ===
The station closed for passengers and parcels on 5 September 1966 prior to electrification between London Waterloo and Bournemouth, when neither Northam station nor Southampton Terminus were included in the upgrade. The mail offices closed in December of the following year, transferring their work to Southampton Central. By December 1968 most of the track had been removed. In 1970 the remaining signal box and track work was removed and the running lines filled in to platform level to act as a car park.

After closure, all services were redirected to Southampton Central, which remains the main station for the city.

Preceding station	Disused railways	Following station
Northam; Line and station closed	London & South Western Railway; London and Southampton Railway	Terminus

== Current usage ==
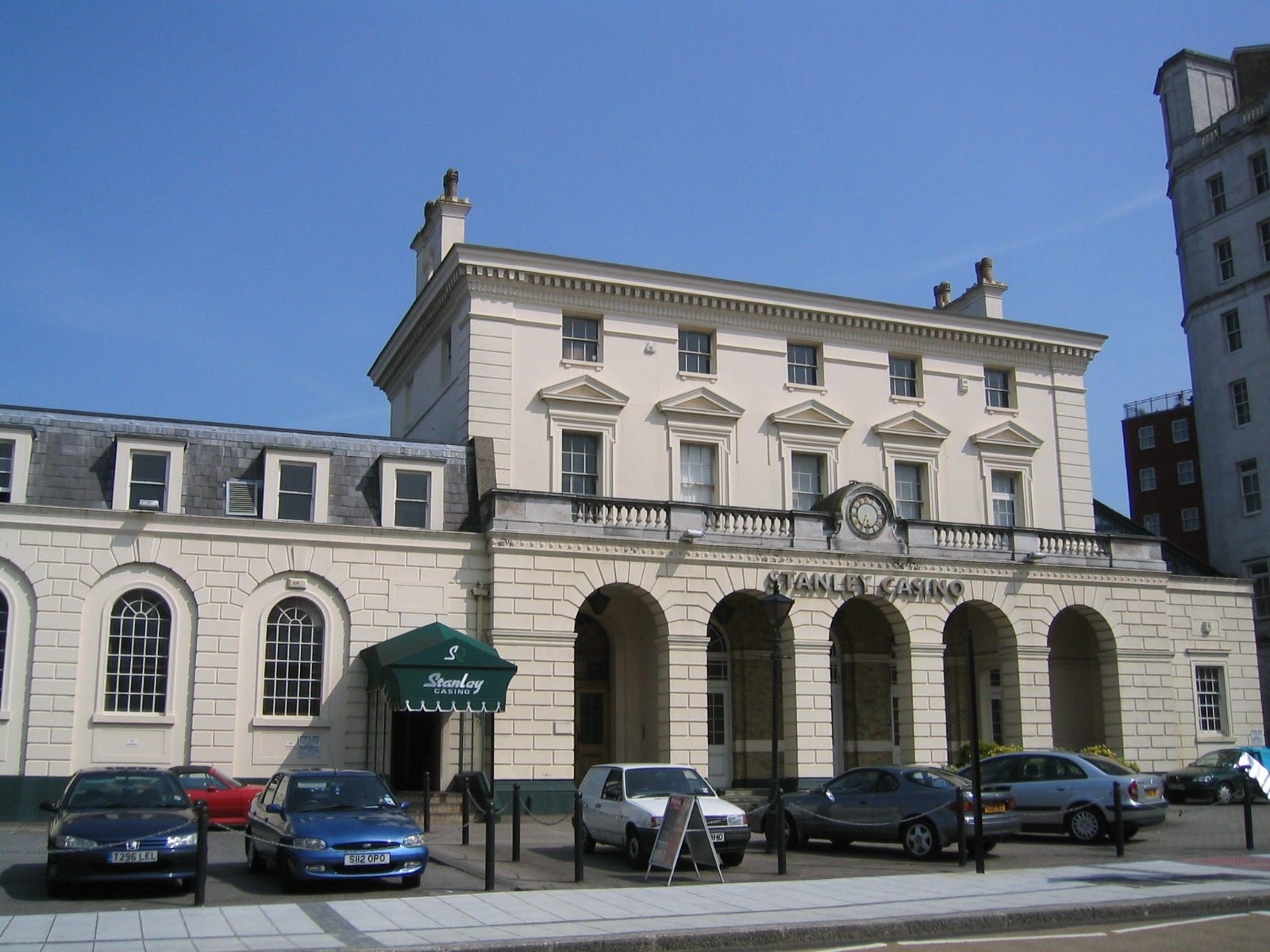
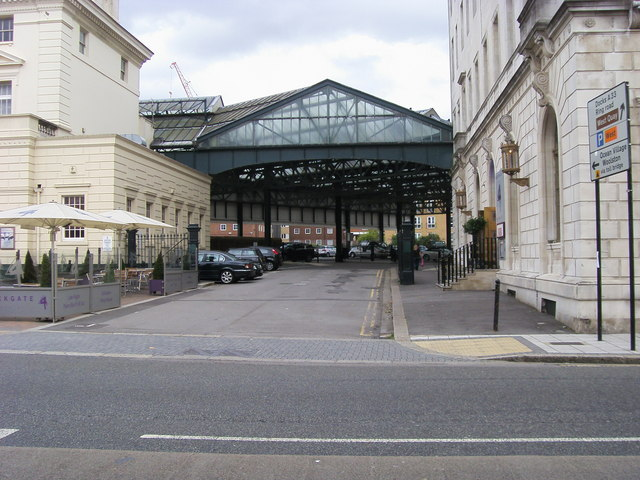
Pictures of Southampton Terminus today.

The former Terminus station building is now a casino operated by the Genting Group. The South Western Hotel has been converted into private apartments. The private road into what would be the platforms is now a car park. Of the platforms, all that remains is the glass canopy and a single line that runs from Northam junction to the Queen Elizabeth II Cruise Terminal.

== Reopening plans ==
A £10 million plan was put forward in 1999 to reopen Southampton Terminus and Northam station, which was to have been controlled by the Anglia Railways train operating company.

The plans included building a new rail-link using the remaining track by St. Mary's Stadium and as far as the waterfront, which is now safeguarded by Southampton City Council for future rail links. It was also hoped it would reduce the traffic around Southampton with a local commuter line linking the Waterfront to Romsey, Halterworth and Chandler's Ford. The plans were thwarted after South West Trains changed their 1999 time table, which resulted in two of Southampton Central's four tracks being blocked for about 20 minutes of each hour, resulting in capacity issues.

Southampton City Council has safeguarded the remaining land for future use to build a small railway station on the former down line at Canute Road level crossing, opposite the former Southampton Terminus railway station. The project is named TI4 Waterfront Station.
