= St Julien's Church, Southampton =

St Julien
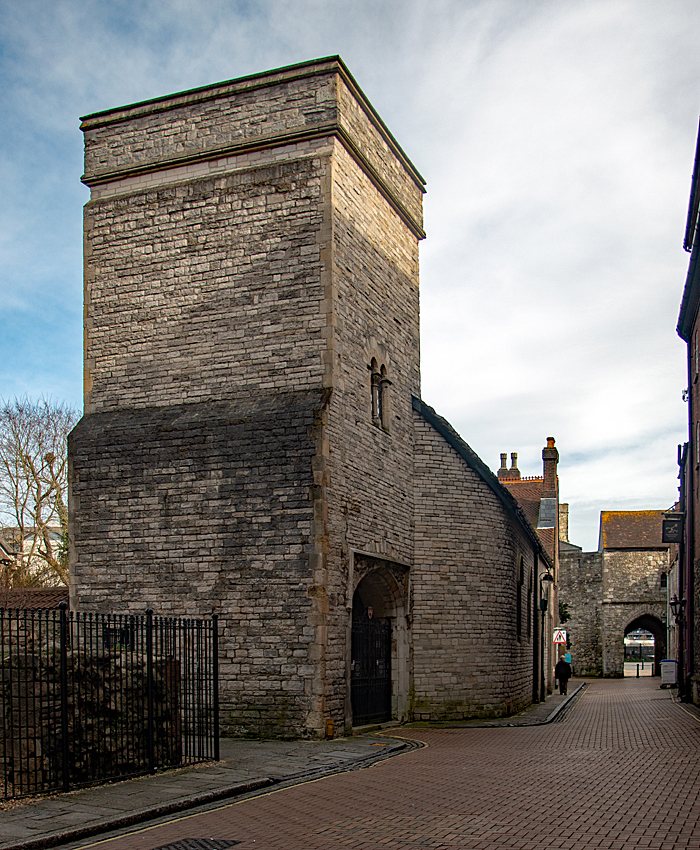
- St Julien's Church, Southampton

- Shown within Southampton
- 50°53′47″N 1°24′13″W
- OS grid reference: SU 42041 10951
- Country: England
- Previous denomination: Anglican

History
- Status: Chapel
- Founded: 1185
- Dedication: St. Julien

Architecture
- Functional status: Preserved; privately owned
- Heritage designation: Grade I listed
- Designated: 14 July 1953

St. Julien's Church on Winkle Street in Southampton was the chapel of the Hospital of St. Julien or God's House which was founded c. 1197 as an almshouse and hostel for travellers on pilgrimage to Canterbury. It was used regularly by French Protestants from the 16th century until 1939 and is thus also known as the French Church. The church is sometimes referred to as "St Julian's" but Southampton City Council's Heritage Environment Record clarifies that "St Julien's" is the correct spelling, which is also used on Ordnance Survey maps.

Ownership of the church was transferred to The Queen's College, Oxford, which still owns it, in 1343.

The building is Grade I listed, having first been listed on 14 July 1953. The building was extensively restored in 1861 and consists of a stone rubble exterior and tiled roof, with a low square tower. Inside the church is the Leper's Squint Stoup Monument commemorating those that were executed in the Southampton Plot of 1415, although the monument itself is thought to date from the 19th century.

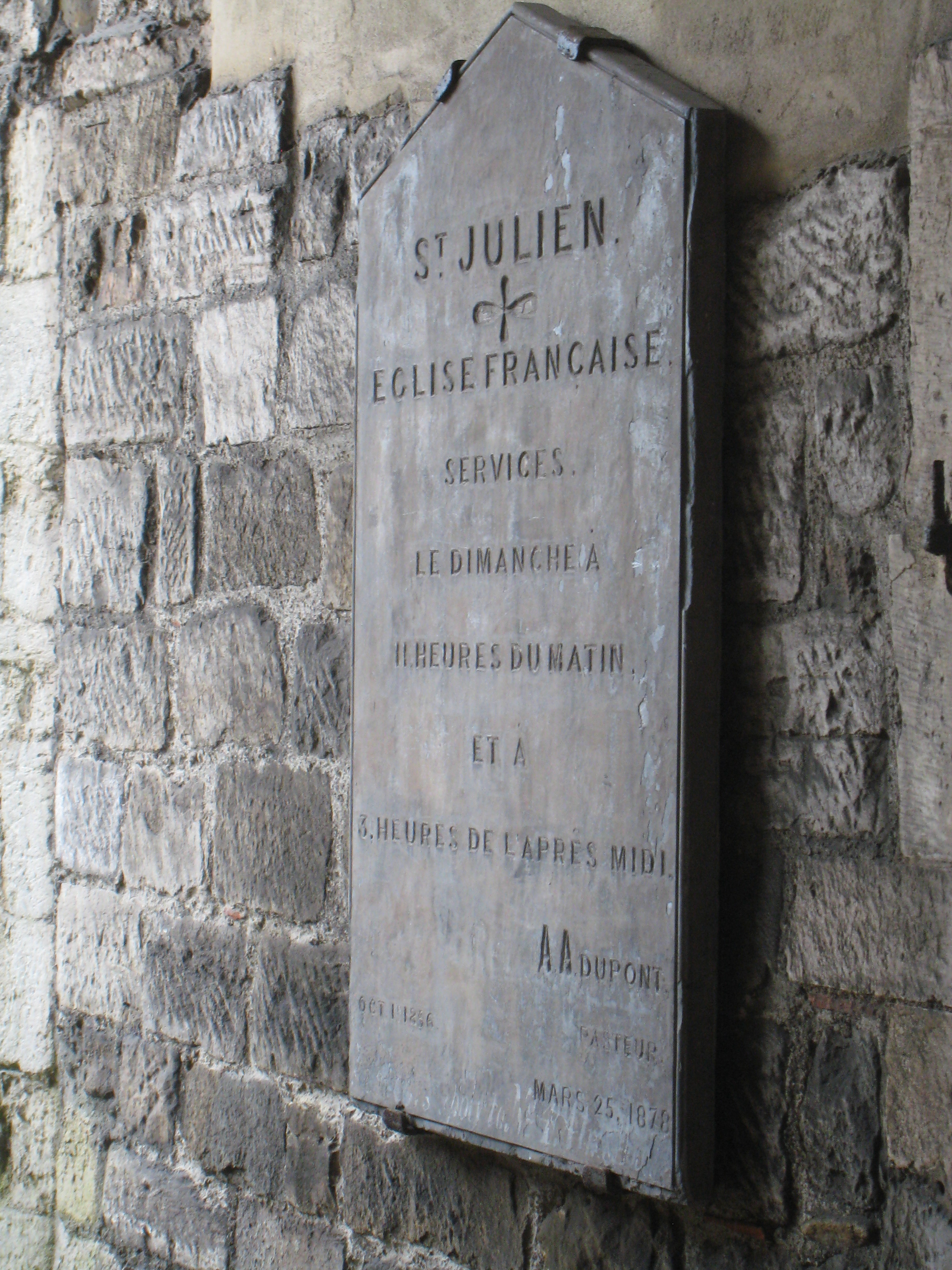
Sign on the church giving details (in French) of services. The sign is dated 25 March 1878

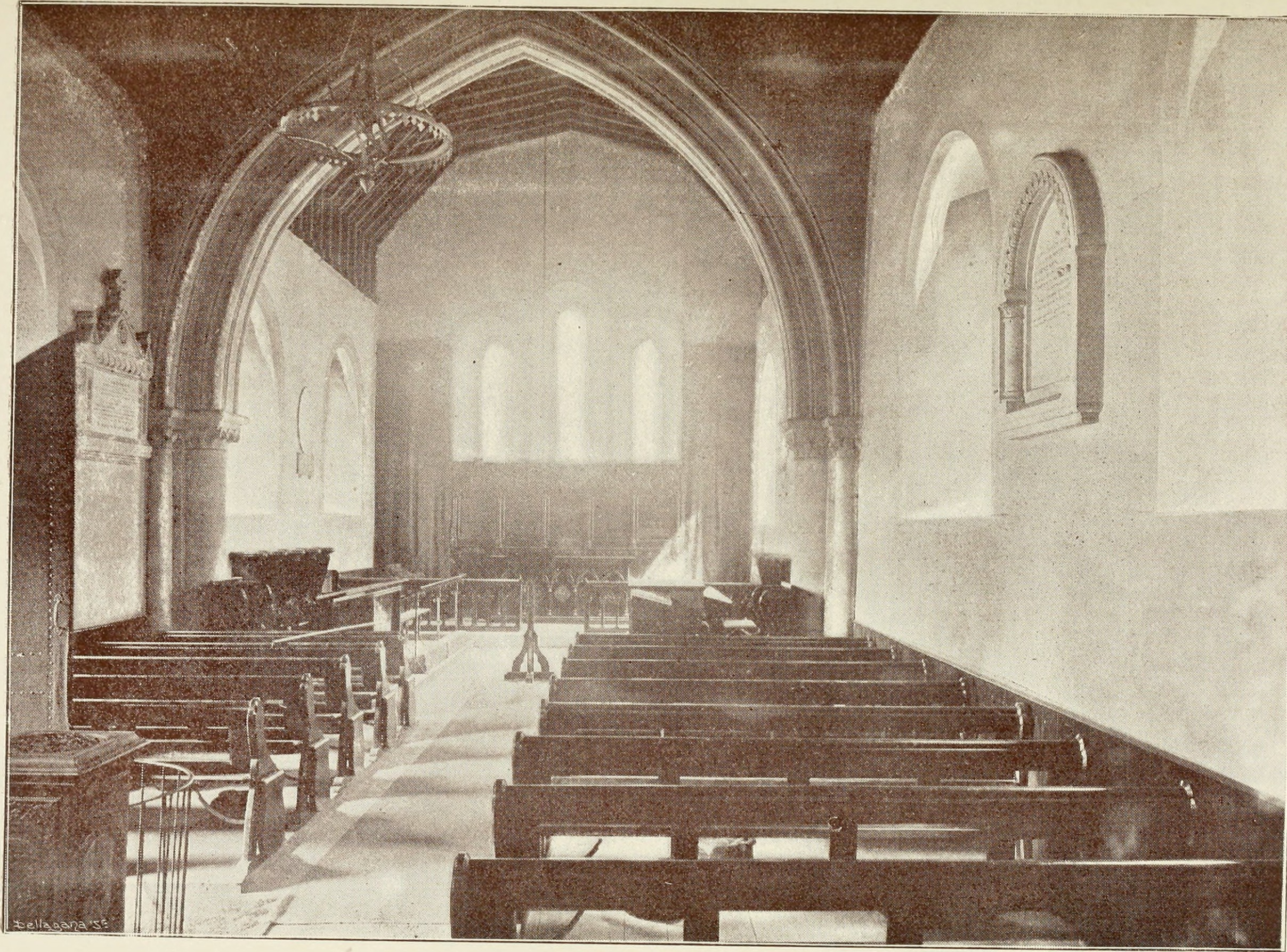
Interior of God's House Chapel, c. 19th century

The chapel is privately owned, with only occasional public access on open days and guided walks run by the city's official tourist guides.

== Burials ==
Richard of Conisburgh, 3rd Earl of Cambridge is buried at the church.
