= God's House Tower =

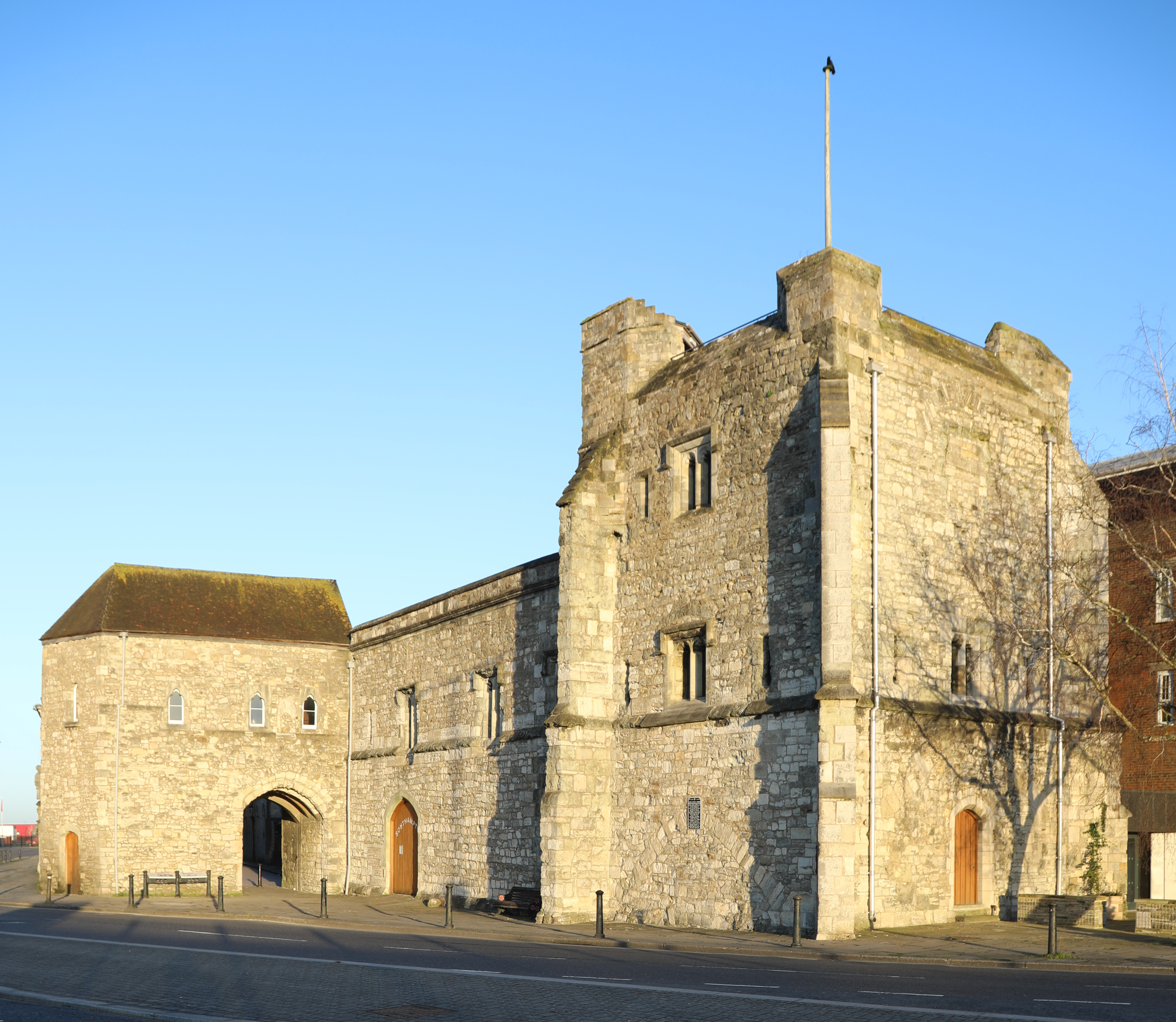
- God's House tower looking west from The Platform

- Location within Southampton

General information
- Type: Gateway
- Architectural style: Medieval
- Location: Winkle Street/Town Quay, Southampton
- Coordinates: 50°53′47″N 1°24′10″W
- Current tenants: a space arts
- Construction started: circa 1300
- Completed: early 15th century
- Owner: Southampton City Council

Technical details
- Floor count: 2/3

Listed Building – Grade I
- Official name: God's House Gate
- Designated: 14 July 1953
- Reference no.: 1340004

God's House Tower is a late 13th century gatehouse into the old town of Southampton, England. It stands at the south-east corner of the town walls and permitted access to the town from the Platform and Town Quay. It is now an arts and heritage venue, and has previously served as the town gaol and housed the Museum of Archaeology. The building is Grade I listed and a scheduled ancient monument.

== History ==
The original gatehouse was a simple affair, built in the late 13th century and known as the Saltmarsh Gate, as it led to marshlands outside the town. Being close to God's House Hospital, which had been founded in 1168 by Gervase le Riche as a refuge for travellers, the gateway became known as the God's House gateway. Following the French raid on the town in 1338, the town's defences were strengthened and the gateway was reinforced.

The tower was further extended in 1417 by the addition of a two-storey gallery and a three-storey tower, to the east of the gateway; this was one of the earliest forts built specifically to carry cannon and had eight gunports and rooftop firing points. This spur enabled the town gunner to protect the sluices that controlled the flow of seawater into a tidal moat used to power the water mill under the tower. The town gunner was also responsible for making the gunpowder and gunshot which he stored, together with the guns, in the gallery of the tower.

By the start of the 17th century, the building had fallen into disrepair as the town no longer needed strong defences and in 1707 part of the building was being used as a house of correction. From 1786, it became the town gaol; at this time, the tower was known as the "Lambcote Tower". In 1855, a new prison was opened in Ascupart Street and the prison in the tower was closed.

The building stood empty until 1876, when it was requisitioned by the Southampton Harbour Board for use as storage, although the groundfloor of the gatehouse was retained for use as a mortuary. At this time, the buildings were restored and the exterior was cleaned.

In 1957, approval was sought to convert the building into a museum: four years later in 1961, the Museum of Archaeology opened to the public and then closed in September 2011.

=== Statue of Prince Albert ===
In 1877, Sir Frederick Perkins, M.P. for Southampton, presented the town with a terracotta statue of Prince Albert which was placed at the eastern end of the building. Perkins had paid £300 for the statue in 1869 and had presented it to the Albert Infirmary at Bishops Waltham; on the closure of the infirmary, he donated it to the town of Southampton. The statue was designed by William Theed and made at the terracotta works in Lambeth.

In 1912, the statue was in a dilapidated condition and to prevent offence to Kaiser William II, Prince Albert's grandson, who was visiting the town, the statue was removed and put into store. During the First World War, the statue was destroyed by Royal Engineers who found it in the corporation's storage yard.

=== Museum of Archaeology ===
From 1961 to September 2011, God's House Tower was occupied by the city's Museum of Archaeology. The museum had three main galleries which told the story of Southampton in the Roman, Saxon and Medieval periods. The displays included stone tools dating as far back as the Palaeolithic recovered from gravel pits.

Two galleries about the archaeology of the local Anglo-Saxon settlement, Hamwic, were designed by the council's archaeology and curatorial staff, and opened by Rosemary Cramp in 1968. In 2007 these were updated on a tight budget to cover new findings and interpretation. In September 2011, the museum was closed and its exhibits were transferred to the new SeaCity Museum which opened in April 2012. This was part of restructuring and budget savings which also involved downgrading the curator roles significantly. The decision to remove the display has been described as "shameful".

The city council then made the lease of the former museum premises available for up to 20 years, with a possibility of them being used as offices or a gallery. The artefacts are now displayed in the "Gateway to the World" exhibition in the new museum.

=== Arts and heritage venue ===
In 2019, God's House Tower reopened as an arts and heritage venue, with a permanent gallery about the history of the building, two galleries showing contemporary art and works from South Coast collections, access to the views from the roof, and a cafe.

== Salisbury and Southampton Canal ==
The short-lived Salisbury and Southampton Canal, which operated between 1802 and 1808, entered the River Test by way of a lock adjacent to God's House Tower. Although the canal company claimed that they had constructed "an arch under the Debtors Gaol in Southampton, wide enough for barges to go out of the lock into open water", the actual lock was just to the north of the tower. From here, the canal followed a route just outside the town walls northwards until its junction with the Northam branch at what is now Palmerston Park.

== Architecture ==
=== Exterior ===
The gatehouse and tower are built of stone "rubble" and are two or three storeys high. The arched gateway had a double portcullis, the grooves of which are still visible. The windows are described as "trefoil or cinquefoil headed lights". Under the main tower, the filled in arches of the tidal moat and sluices are visible on both the southern and northern flanks.

In the upper storey of the Tower and the connecting gallery there are a series of two-light windows and keyhole-shaped gunports. These were unblocked in the late nineteenth century when the window tracery was also restored. The roof of the tower is modern.

=== Interior ===
Prior to its restoration in 1961, the gallery was just a shell and both the floor and stairs had long since disappeared. A modern staircase was built and a mezzanine floor inserted between the two floors. The remains of a mural stairway leading to a parapet above is still visible.

== Nearby buildings ==
Opposite the gateway, in Winkle Street, is the only other remaining substantial part of the original hospital, the Church of St. Julien. Just outside the gate is the Old Bowling Green, the oldest bowling green in the world which dates back to at least 1299.

Tower House, which adjoins the gateway to the west, was built in the 19th century, replacing an earlier building. This is also a Grade II listed building. In 2012, it was occupied by "a space arts", providing studio space for "emerging" artists.
