= Marlands Shopping Centre =

Coordinates: 50.906°N 1.406°W

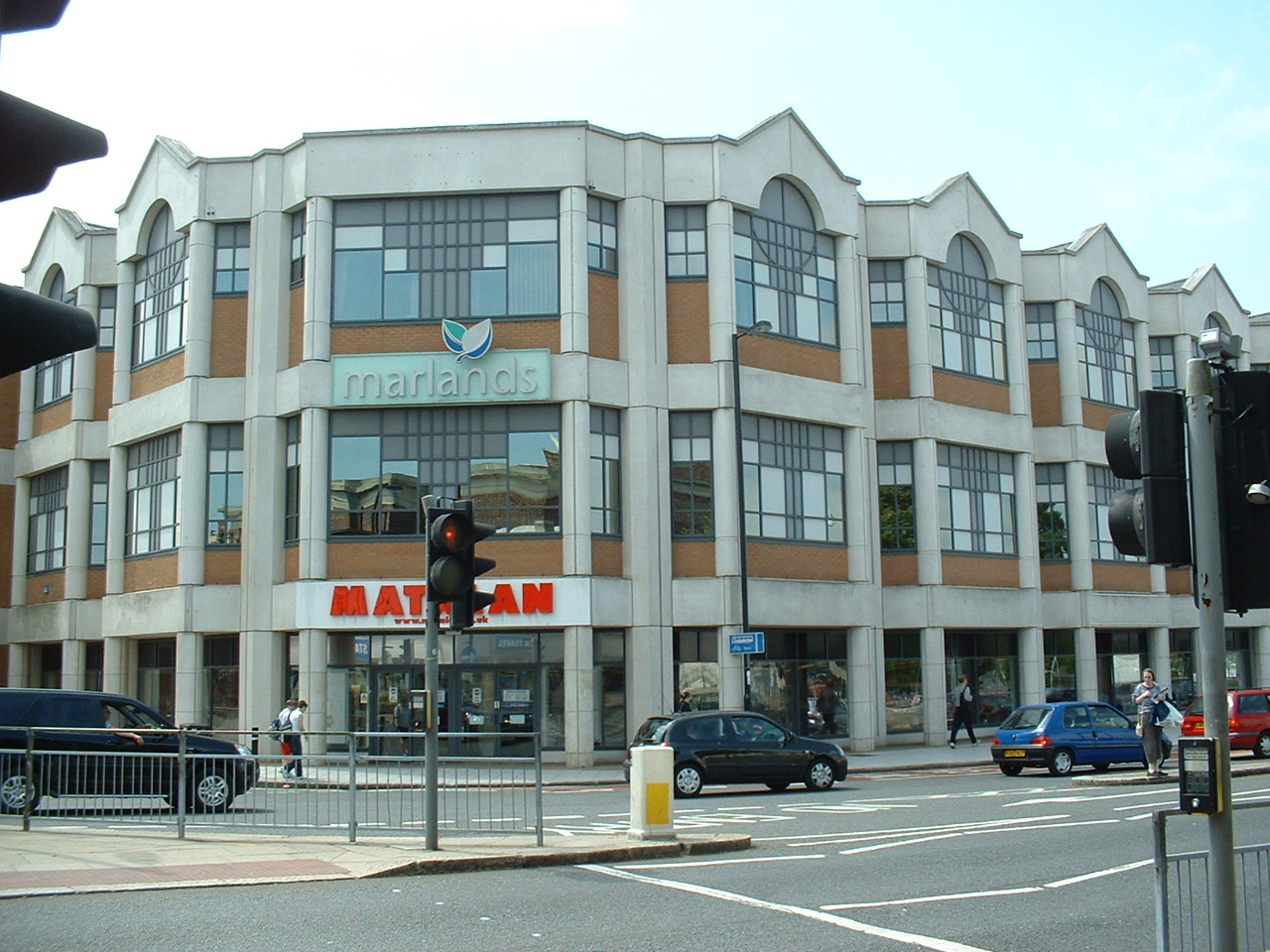
- Location: Southampton, United Kingdom
- Opened: 5 September 1991
- Owner: Ellandi
- Num. of stores: 67
- Parking: 810
- Website: www.marlandsshoppingcentre.co.uk

The Marlands Shopping Centre (formerly known as The Mall Southampton) was opened on 5 September 1991 in Southampton, United Kingdom. At the time, the Marlands Shopping Mall was the largest shopping centre in Southampton and the first significant shopping centre in the city.

However, it is now dwarfed by Westquay which opened in 2000.

== Construction ==
The Marlands Shopping Centre was constructed to a postmodern design, and was built on the site of Southampton's bus station (the city is now without such a facility), a popular rose garden and some terraced housing which had become shops, on Manchester Street. These were destroyed in 1988 to make way for the shopping centre, despite local opposition. A replica of the Manchester Street shops was constructed as part of the centre's atrium.

== Renovations ==
On 28 August 1999, it was announced that The Marlands would undergo a facelift ahead of the opening of Westquay the following year. The plans included demolishing the clock tower to be replaced with a massive steel grid with 'Marlands Shopping' displayed in illuminated letters visible from Westquay. On the inside of the centre, stainless steel cladding replaced the marble surrounds to the lifts, the toilets were refurbished and a second mother and baby room was built.

In May 2001, plans were announced for another revamp following visitor numbers dropping since the opening of Westquay. These included a new back-lit, glazed entrance feature to replace the clock structure on Above Bar, a new entrance lobby from Portland Terrace opposite the Asda supermarket, internal changes to create a better link between ground and first floor shops, removal of the bandstand feature by Dunnes store and the introduction of a new mall cafe.

On 26 February 2006, plans were made for a £2.3 million makeover, making it the centre's second major revamp in just five years. The owners planned to build a new entrance by constructing a covered walkway leading from Above Bar to Manchester Street, with the roof being glazed in clear reflective glass. At the first floor level of the new walkway, a food court would be built. Also, new paving within the walkway and a new escalator were also planned. Work began on the revamp in August 2006.

== History ==
The original anchor tenant of the mall was Dunnes Stores, though following their exit this facility was later occupied by Matalan. In 2014, it was confirmed that the Matalan store would be split to provide retail stores for Peacocks and Poundworld. Since then Peacocks has closed down. Other significant stores within the centre include CeX and F. Hinds.

On 9 June 2021, the Disney Store shut down for the final time after 26 years of trading. On 4 November 2021, it was replaced by a pop-up Saints Store. At the end of January 2023, the Saints store closed its doors for good. On 13 March 2023, video game store The Loft Ladder closed down after ten years, citing that the company hopes to relocate to the city centre. On 21 April 2023, Black Axe opened Southampton's first dedicated axe throwing venue.

A soft play area called Sea Life operated in the Marlands between 2019 and August 2025.

== Stores ==
As of May 2023, there are currently 35 shops on the ground floor and 20 shops on the second floor.

=== Ground floor ===
- One Below
- Fabulous
- BB's Coffee & Muffins
- Lillies
- Cards Direct
- Shoe Zone
- Savers
- Route One
- Grapetree
- Shoe Boutique
- Claires
- Adams Fruit
- Starbucks
- F Hinds
- Moss Bros
- Timpsons
- Phone Tower
- Roman
- Evapo
- Warren James
- Bags 4 U
- My Anime Dream
- Fredericks
- Zen by Bath and Wick
- Supercuts
- U Support
- Chari Teas
- Almagroves
- Yours Clothing
- Est. 1897
- Blue Inc.
- Flourish
- Beauty Brow Bar
- Mobile Gifts
- CeX

=== First floor ===
- Rockbottom Toystore
- Kimaya
- The Affordable Wedding Company
- Black Axe Throwing Co
- The Loft Ladder
- Stakks Pancake House
- Costa Coffee
- Re:So
- Neds Noodles
- Fran and Go
- ShakeAway
- My Pottery
- Sea Life Play Centre
- Vida Marina Fish and Chips
- Hot Pod Yoga
- WED2B
- KIDx
- JRC Global Buffet

== Ownership ==
On 19 August 2010, the Mall was sold as part of a £136m deal to management company The Other Retail Group, with other malls in Gloucester, Romford and Falkirk part of the deal. The new owners intended to rebrand the mall by introducing new retailers to fill the empty shop spaces and compete with Westquay.

In 2014, the Marlands was acquired by Ellandi as part of a deal worth £260 million. The acquisition made Ellandi the largest dedicated owner of community shopping centres in the UK.
