= Holyrood, Southampton =

Holyrood, Southampton may refer to:

- Holyrood Church, a church which now serves as a memorial to the Merchant Navy
- Holyrood estate, a housing estate

== See also ==
- Holyrood (disambiguation)
