= St Denys Priory =

Priory in Southampton, England

St. Denys Priory
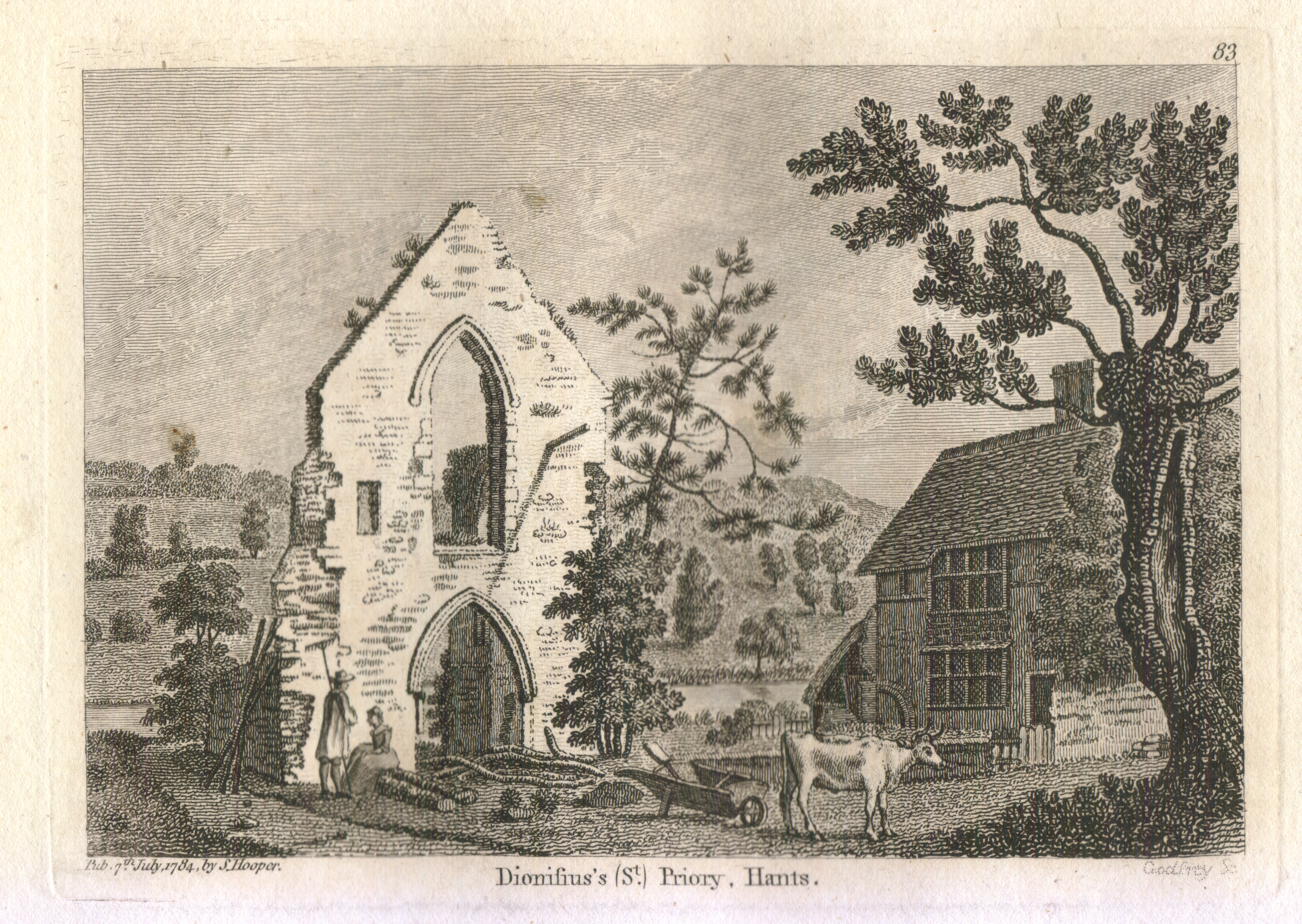
- St. Denys Priory
- Interactive map of St. Denys Priory

Monastery information
- Other name: St. Denis Priory
- Order: Austin Canons
- Established: c. 1124
- Disestablished: 1536

People
- Founder: Henry I

Site
- Location: Southampton, England
- Coordinates: 50.92516°N 1.38085°W
- Visible remains: one wall
- Public access: no

St. Denys Priory was a priory of Austin canons in the St Denys area of Southampton, Hampshire, England.

== Foundation ==
The priory was founded by Henry I in 1124. The foundation charter granted

to God and the church of St. Denis and the canons serving God there, for the health of his soul and of the souls of his father and mother, Maud his wife and William his son, a parcel of land between Portswood and the Itchen, having a rental of 11s. 6d., together with another parcel of land near the sea to the east of the borough, having a rental of 41s. 6d.

A canon named Girard was named in the foundation charter and is assumed to have become the first prior.

== 12th to 16th centuries ==
In 1338 the town of Southampton was sacked and burnt by the French. The town took a long time to recover and as late as April, 1385 protection was granted to the priory of St. Denis and its possessions, because so much of its property had been burnt and destroyed that the costs of repairing the tenements and contributing to the fortification of the town had placed the priory deeply in debt and it did not have the means to pay pensions and corrodies or to maintain the canons.

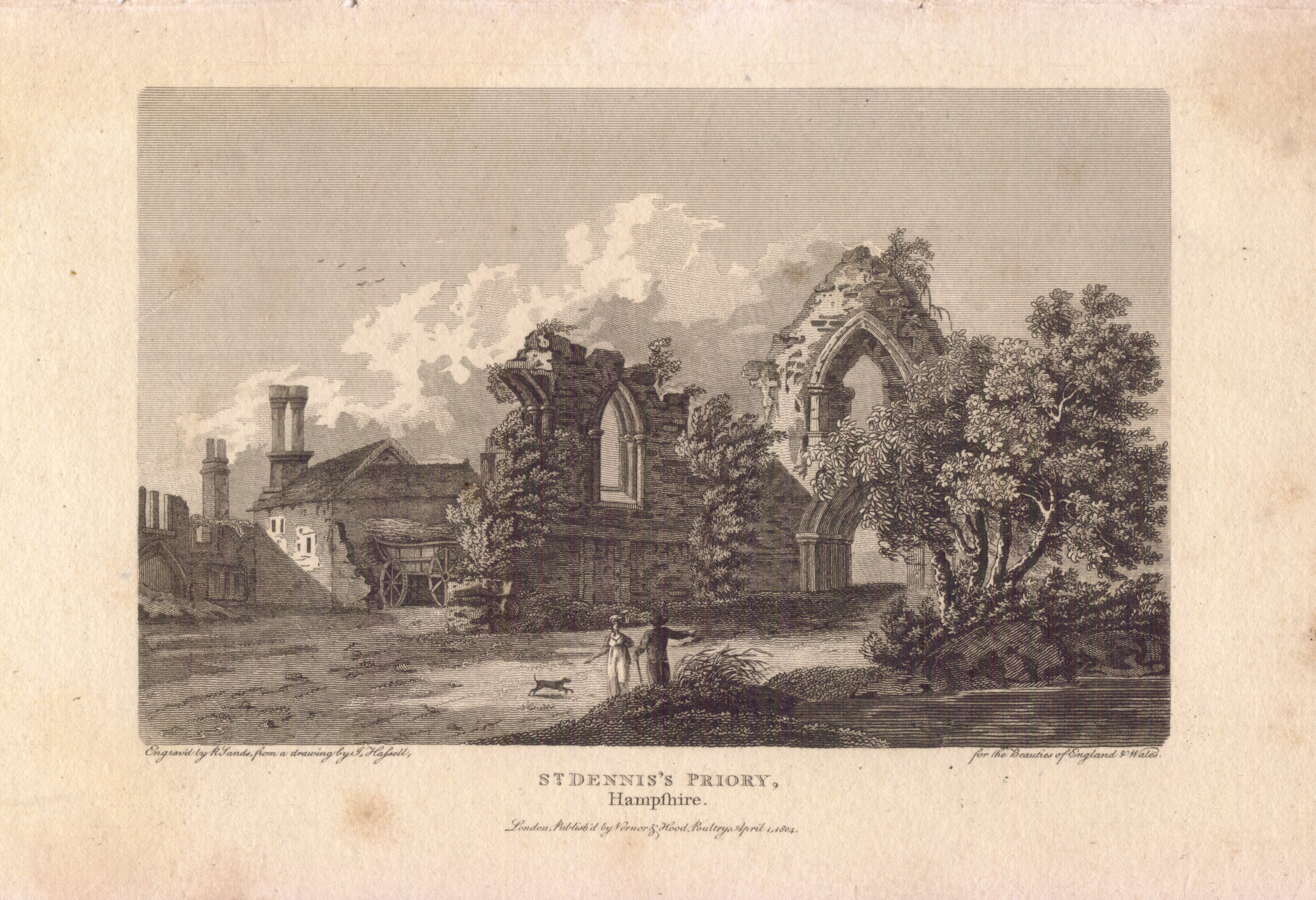
View into the nave of the priory church from approximately the site of the choir in 1804. To the left of the church are the monastic buildings, some of which are apparently in use for farming (note the hay cart).

The priory held the free chapel of the Blessed Mary which was a place of pilgrimage known as St. Mary of Graces. Henry VIII visited it in 1510 and made an offering in person of 6s. 8d..

By the time of the dissolution the priory held various possessions in Southampton, including the manor of St. Denis, and pensions from the churches of the Holyrood, All Saints, St. Lawrence and St. Michael. In Hampshire it held the:

- manors of Northam, 'Leverley', 'Berefords', 'Bremerton' and Quidhampton,
- rectories of 'Estadderley, Aulworth' and Shirley
- lands, rents, pensions, etc., in Aldington (possibly an alternative spelling of Allington), Portswood, East Dean, Broughton, Houghton, King's Somborne, Romsey, Ablington, Appleshaw, Burbage, 'Brinknoll,' 'Shreton,' and Stapleford.

The priory also had lands in Wiltshire at Wilton and Chisbury, and in Dorset at Sturminster and 'Lichette'.

== Dissolution ==
The priory was suppressed in 1536. According to the Valor Ecclesiasticus its annual value was £80 11s. 6d.. There were nine canons and the prior at that time. The prior received a pension of £13 6s. 8d. and the chapel of the Blessed Mary with its appurtenances for life.

== Post-Dissolution ==
In 1538 the site and some of the possessions of the priory were granted to Francis Dautry.

== Present day ==
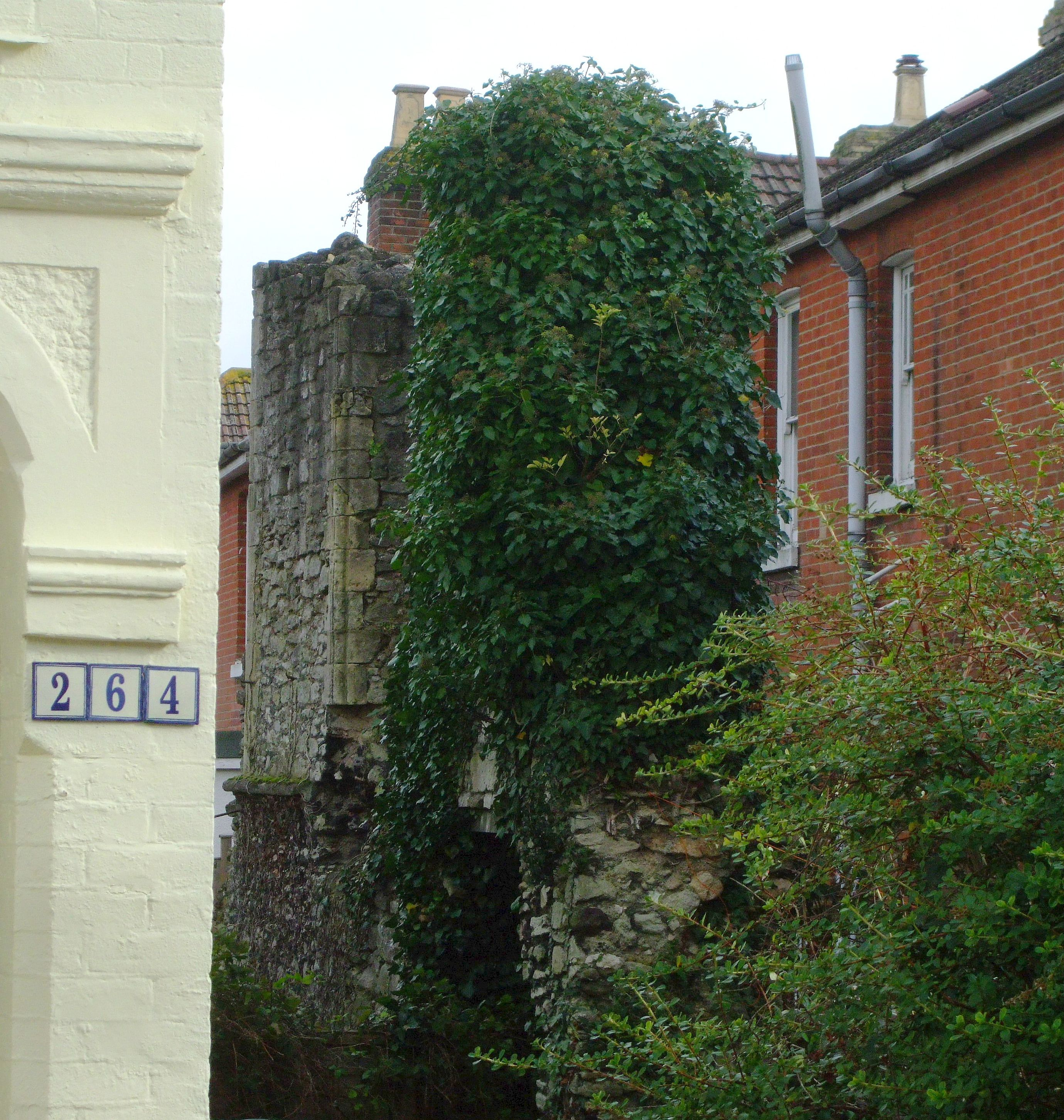
Only this section of 14th-century wall survives at the original site

Only fragments of the priory buildings remain: a wall in a private garden in Priory Road, and a small archway re-sited in the garden of the Tudor House Museum. The present church is late Victorian and holds a few tiles and a coffin from the original site.

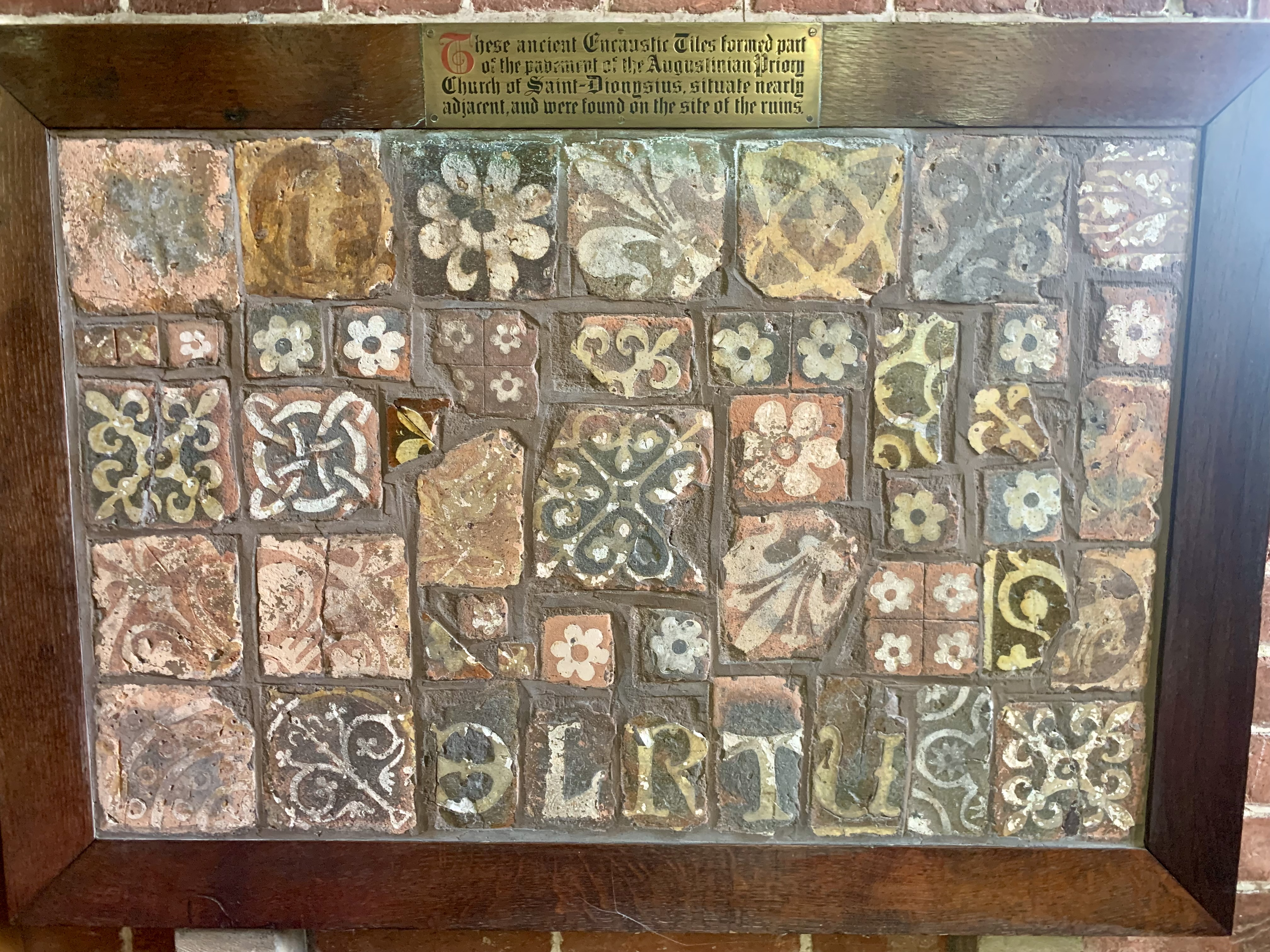
Surviving ancient tiles from the pavement of St Denys Priory, Southampton, on display at St Denys Church, Southampton in 2025.
