= Holy Rood Church =

Holy Rood Church may refer to:

== United Kingdom ==
- Holy Rood Church, Barnsley, South Yorkshire
- Holy Rood Church, Coombe Keynes, Dorset
- Holy Rood Church, Market Rasen, Lincolnshire
- Holy Rood Church, Ossington, Nottinghamshire
- Holy Rood Church, Swindon, Wiltshire
- Holy Rood Church, Watford, Hertfordshire
- Church of the Holy Rood, Ampney Crucis, Gloucestershire
- Church of the Holy Rood, Daglingworth, Gloucestershire
- Church of the Holy Rood, Edwalton, Nottinghamshire
- Church of the Holy Rude, Stirling
- Holyrood Church, Southampton, Hampshire
- Holyrood Abbey Church, Edinburgh
- Holyrood Abbey, Edinburgh

== United States ==
- Holyrood Episcopal Church, New York City

== See also ==
- Holyrood (disambiguation)
