= Holyrood =

Holyrood may refer to:

== Religion ==
- Holyrood (cross), a Christian relic alleged to be part of the True Cross on which Jesus died
- Feast of the Cross, or Holy Rood day, in the Christian liturgical calendar

== Places ==
=== United Kingdom ===
- Holyrood, Edinburgh, an area of Edinburgh, Scotland
  - Holyrood, a metonym for the Scottish Parliament or the Scottish Parliament Building
  - Holyrood Abbey, a ruined Augustinian abbey in Edinburgh
  - Holyrood Palace, formally the Palace of Holyroodhouse, Edinburgh
  - Holyrood Park, a royal park in central Edinburgh
- Holyrood Academy, Chard, Somerset, England
- Holyrood estate, Southampton, England
- Holyrood Secondary School, a school in Glasgow, Scotland

=== Canada ===
- Holyrood, Newfoundland and Labrador
  - Holyrood Thermal Generating Station, Conception Bay, Newfoundland
- Holyrood, Edmonton, Alberta
  - Holyrood Elementary School
  - Holyrood stop, a tram stop
- Holyrood, Huron-Kinloss, Ontario

=== United States ===
- Holyrood, Kansas
- Holy Rood Cemetery, Washington, D.C.
- Cemetery of the Holy Rood, Westbury, New York

== Other uses ==
- "Holyrood", the march of the RAF Regiment
- Holyrood distillery, a Scotch whisky and gin distillery in Edinburgh
- Holyrood (magazine), a Scottish current affairs and politics magazine

== See also ==
- Holy Rood Church (disambiguation)
- Hollywood (disambiguation)
- Rood (Scots), a land measurement of Anglo-Saxon origin
