= Tudor House and Garden =

Grade I listed building and museum

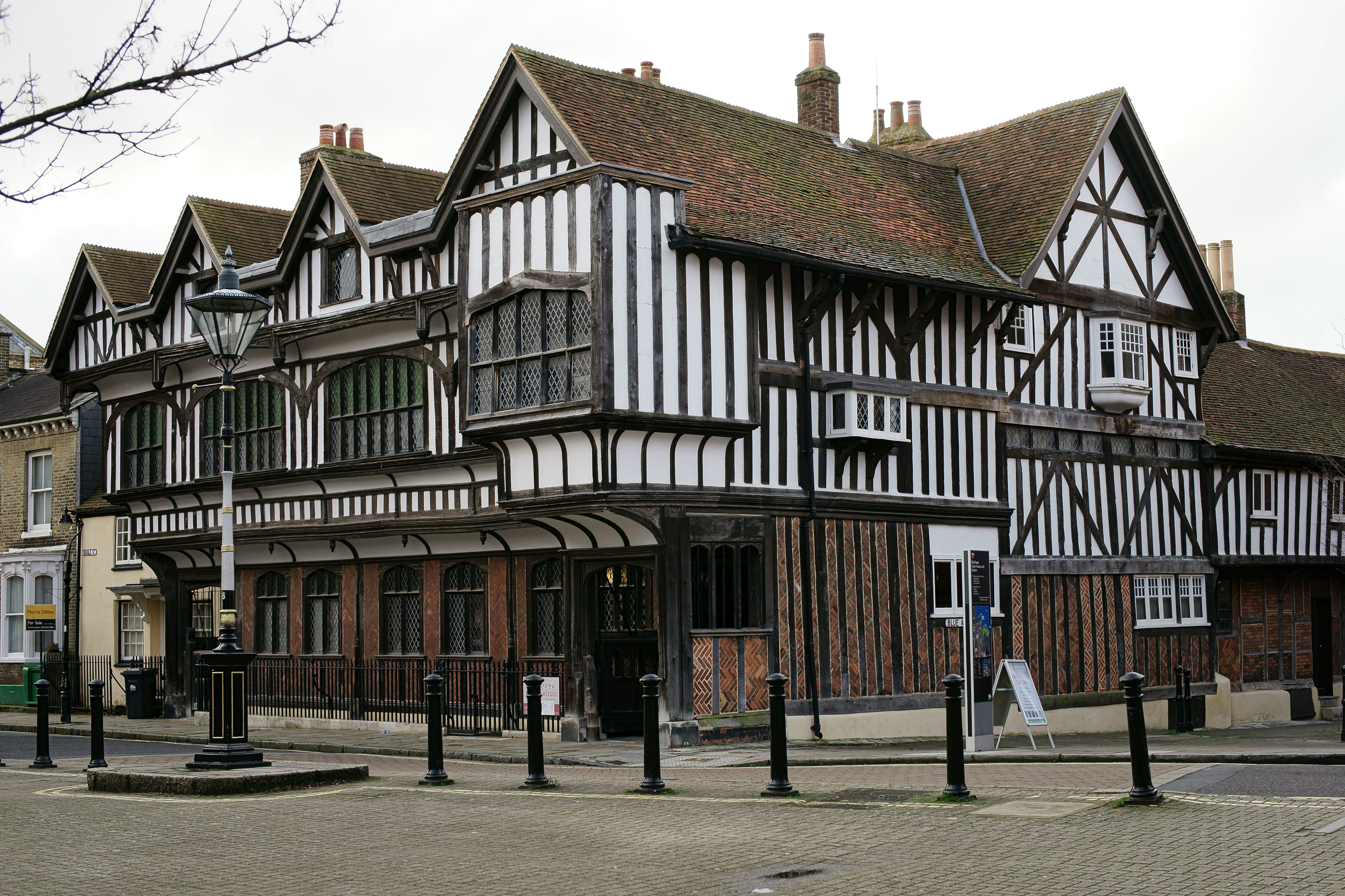
- Tudor House, from St. Michael's Square, Bugle Street

- Location within Southampton
- 50°53′59″N 1°24′22″W
- Type: Tudor House
- Location: Bugle St, Southampton
- OS grid reference: SU 41869 11290

History
- Built: 1491

Site notes
- Area: Hampshire
- Architectural style: Tudor
- Owner: Southampton City Council

Listed Building – Grade I
- Official name: Tudor House Museum
- Designated: 14 July 1953
- Reference no.: 1339964

Tudor House and Garden is a historic building, museum, tourist attraction, and Grade I listed building in Southampton, England. Established as Southampton's first museum in 1912, the house was closed for nine years between 2002 and 2011 during an extensive renovation.

The house is located in Bugle Street, opposite St. Michael's Square, in Southampton's Old Town.

== History ==
=== 1180–15th century ===
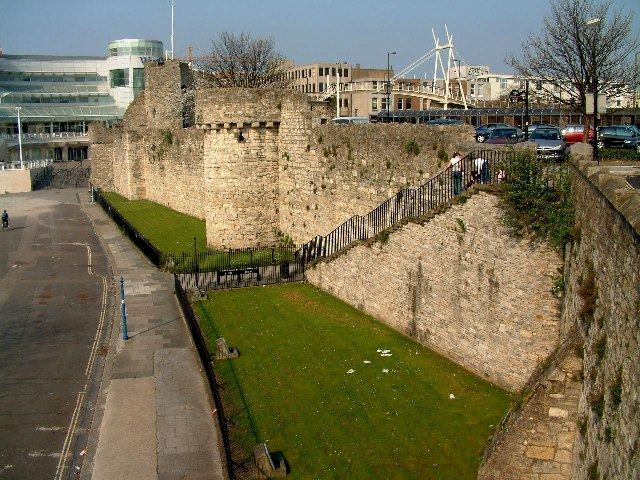
Southampton Town Walls, fortified after 1338

The earliest part of the site is a Norman domestic dwelling, built in the 1180s. Although the site is known as King John's Palace there is no evidence that King John of England ever visited the house. In the 14th century the merchant and mayor of Southampton, John Whytegod, lived in the property. After the French raid of Southampton in 1338 the walls were turned into what would become Southampton's defensive walls. Its windows and doors were filled in or replaced with gun slits. It is one of the finest examples of Norman domestic architecture in England.

=== 15th century–1550 ===
The main body of the house was extended and developed by Sir John Dawtrey (d.1518), a major landowner, M.P. and Sheriff. He received large sums of money from Henry VIII to supply food for the navy and to help in the defences of the town. Money was also provided for the building, fitting out and provisioning of ships – including The Mary Rose. During the Tudor period, the house was a home for influential members of Southampton society including Sir Richard Lyster (1480–1554), a judge and Chief Justice of the King's Bench.

=== 1550–1700 ===
In the sixteenth and seventeenth centuries the house was used as a merchant house as a cloth maker and manufacturer. During the restoration, in 2007, conservators discovered that several walls were covered with graffiti that dated between 1570 and 1620. Images include ships, caricatures of people, and exotic animals. During that period Tudor House was owned by ship owners, and it is likely that the house was used as a place of lodging for sailors and privateers. The graffiti is now considered to be some of the best-preserved Tudor maritime graffiti in England.

=== 18th century ===
During the 18th century, Tudor House was owned by the artist George Rogers, who made significant alterations to the house, including building a Georgian wing, complete with two large sash windows. By this time, the oak beam façade at the front of the property had been plastered and repainted.

The house's improvements in fortune coincided with those of Southampton, which had become fashionable as a spa town, due to the discovery of a chalybeate spring.

=== 19th century ===
For a large proportion of the century the house was divided into lease-held properties. The house also had a number of business uses, including a dyeworks, bookbinders, bonnet-makers and architect's office. By the end of the 19th century the area around Tudor House had become one of the city's worst slum areas, with limited running water, disease-ridden properties, and malnourished tenants. Because of this the area, including Tudor House, was scheduled for demolition.

=== 20th century ===
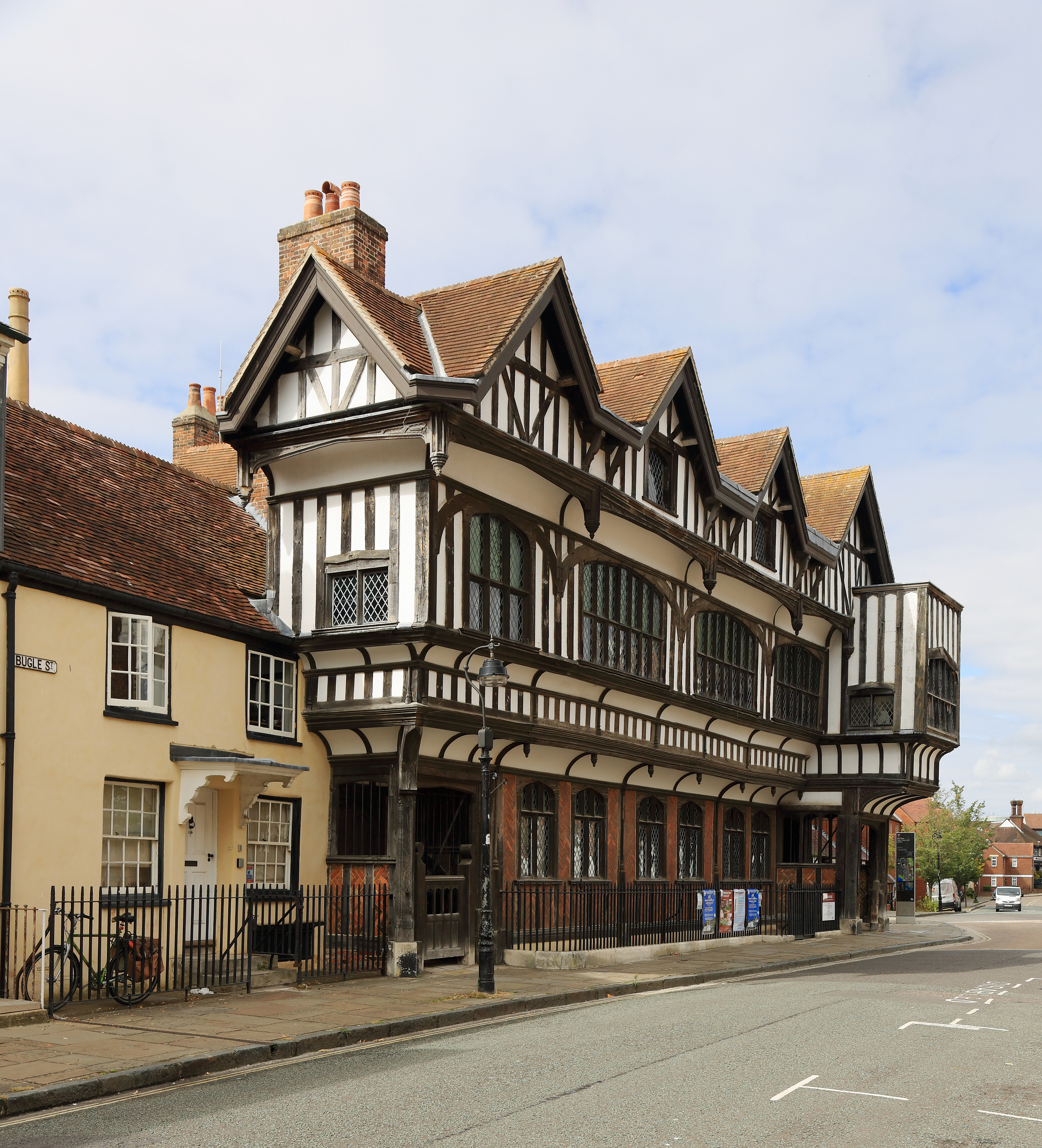
As seen from Bugle Street

In 1886, when the house was threatened with demolition, local philanthropist William Spranger bought the house, recognising its significance as a site of historic importance. Spranger made significant changes to the house, including installing a 'minstrels' gallery in above the banqueting hall, and creating several doors where previously there had been none. For twelve years he led a campaign to turn the house into a museum. Eventually he was successful, and the house opened as a museum on 31 July 1912.

During the Second World War Tudor House and Garden remained open as a museum, and the wine cellar was used as an air raid shelter by the museum curator, Edward Judd, and his family during the Southampton Blitz in 1940. Tudor House remained undamaged, however a house two doors away was destroyed.

In the 1970s an early 19th-century cannon that had been found during the construction of the Itchen Bridge was placed in the house garden.

By the end of the century, the museum had become fairly dilapidated; a combination of poor renovation work, and time. According to a survey conducted in 1999, the house was 'opening like the petals of a flower', a reference to the way the house was bowing outwards.

In 1999, a survey of the building discovered major structural problems, and major redevelopment work was needed to preserve the building. Funds were sought from Southampton City Council, the Heritage Lottery Fund, English Heritage, and other donors.

=== 21st century ===
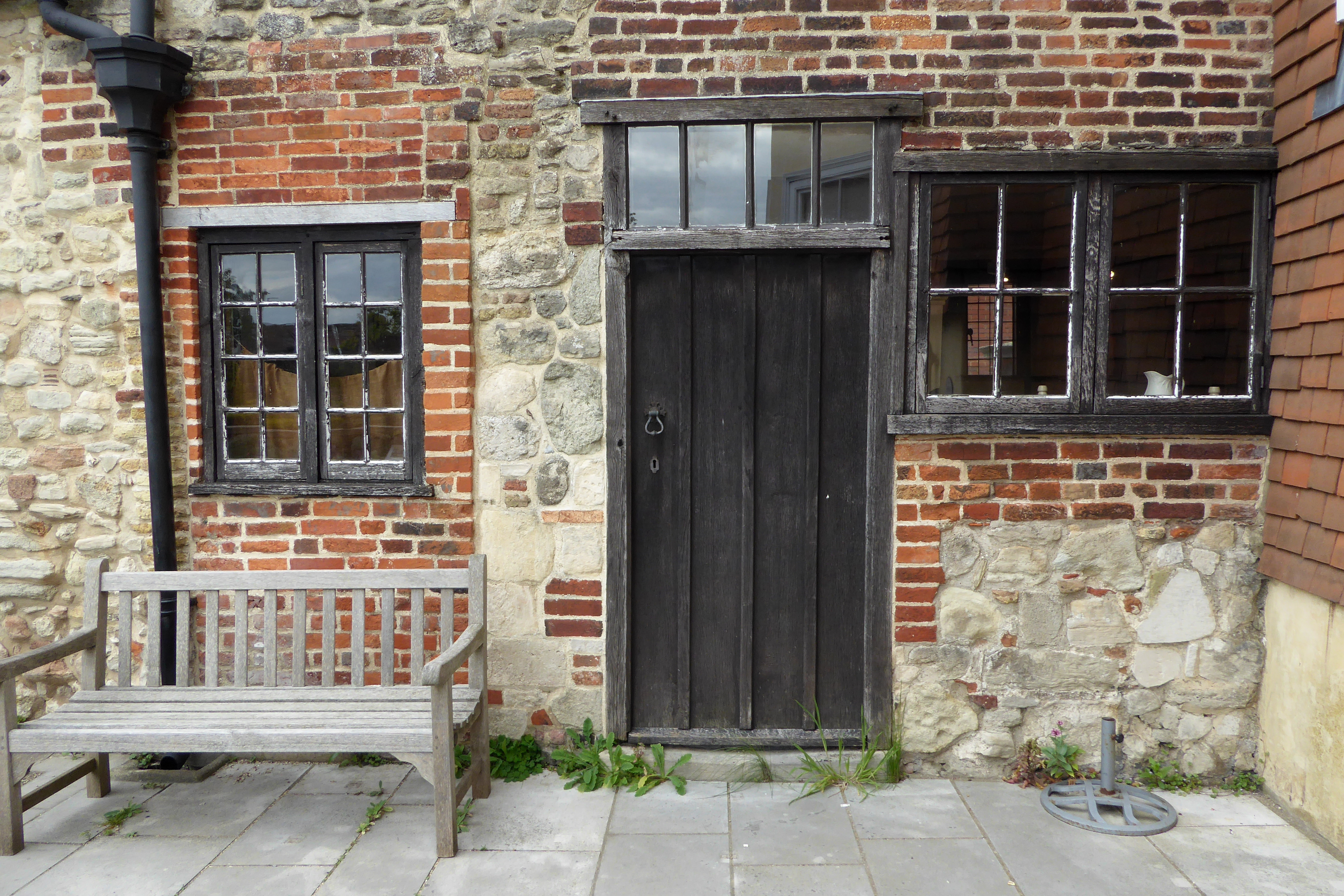
External architectural detail

The museum closed to the public in 2002, and remained closed for nine years. During this time walls were strengthened, new interpretation was added, and archaeological fieldwork was conducted. Additionally a new block was added, consisting of a cafe and toilet facilities. These were designed to remain in keeping with the original building.

In 2012, the centenary was marked by opening with an admission price of 6 pence, the same price as when the museum first opened.

== Garden ==
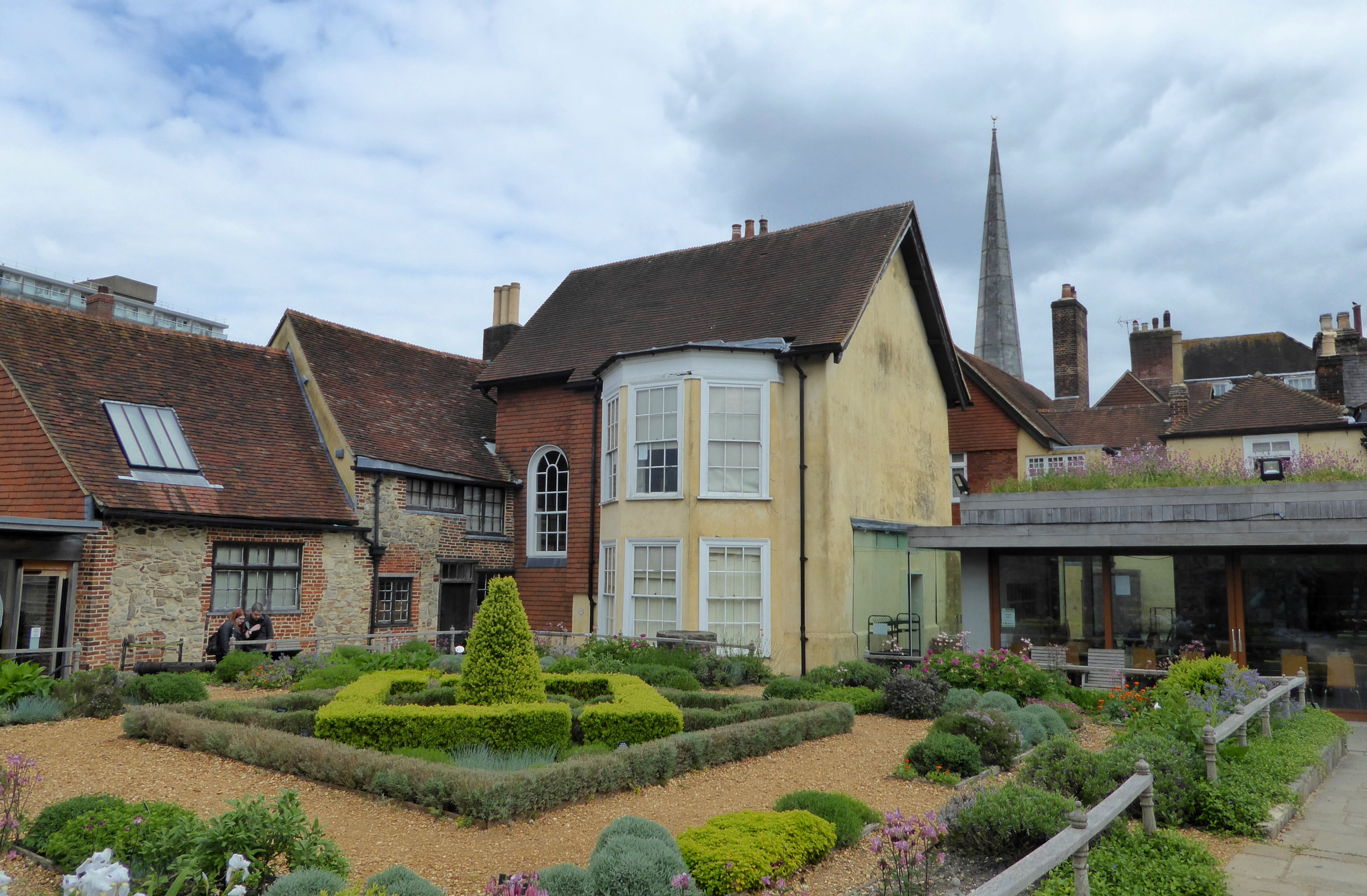
Tudor House's Garden, with the spire of St Michael's Church in the background.

The garden was initially developed in the 16th century, and was seen as an extension of the house itself. The current garden is a recreation of a Tudor knot garden, and was designed by garden historian Dr Sylvia Landsberg. The plants in the garden are representative of the types of plants that would have been found during the Tudor period, particularly herbs and edible plants.

The garden is based on manuscripts and other historic sources. Features of the garden include parapets and mounts, a fountain plot, a seat arbour, and bee bole.

== Bibliography ==
- Landsberg, Sylvia (2012). The Tudor Garden. Southampton City Council, England.
- Tucker, Sue (2011). Tudor House and Garden: 900 years of history in the Heart of Southampton's Old Town. Southampton City Council.
