= St Mary's Church, Southampton =

Saint Mary's Church
- Saint Mary's Southampton
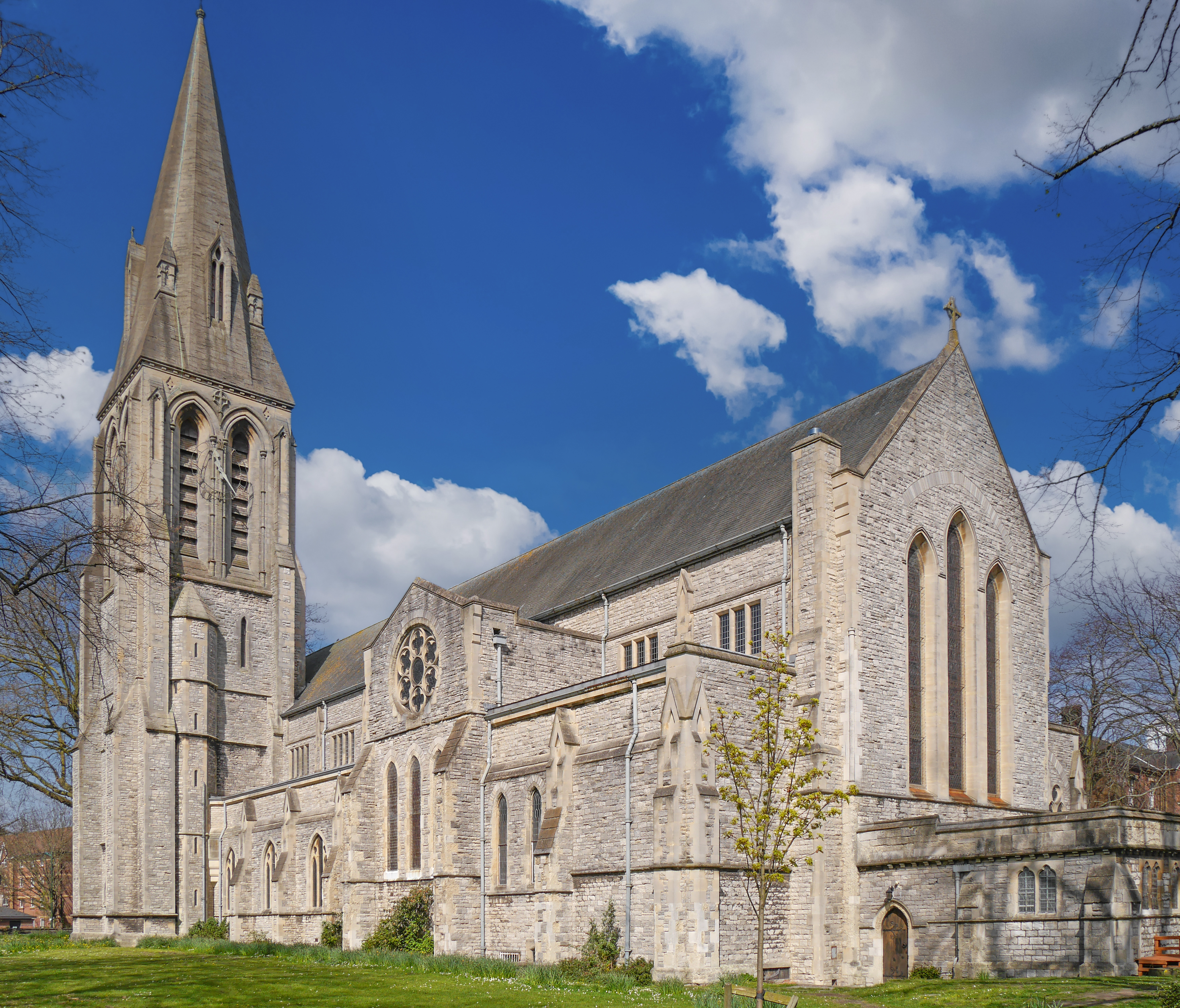
- Saint Mary's Church from the southeast, showing the older tower and spire with the rebuilt body of the church

- Shown within Southampton
- 50°54′10″N 1°23′42″W
- Location: Southampton, Hampshire, England
- Denomination: Church of England
- Churchmanship: Charismatic evangelical Anglican
- Website: saintmarys.church

History
- Status: Parish church
- Founded: c. 634
- Dedication: Mary, Mother of Jesus

Architecture
- Functional status: Active
- Heritage designation: Grade II listed
- Designated: 14 July 1953
- Architect: G. E. Street
- Style: Gothic Revival
- Years built: 1878–1954

Specifications
- Materials: Exterior: Purbeck stone Interior: Bath stone

Administration
- Province: Province of Canterbury
- Diocese: Diocese of Winchester
- Archdeaconry: Bournemouth
- Deanery: Southampton
- Parish: Saint Mary Southampton

Clergy
- Vicar: Jon Finch

Saint Mary's Church, is the civic church for the city of Southampton, England. Originally founded in circa 634, St Mary's has been the mother church of Southampton since its inception. The present building, now the sixth incarnation of a church on this site, dates mostly to a rebuilding from 1954 to 1956, following its destruction in the Southampton Blitz, except for the notable Grade II listed tower and spire, which date from 1912 to 1914.

Being the mother church of the city, it is both the tallest and the largest church in Southampton, making it a local landmark, after which another landmark, St Mary's Stadium, is named. The church is notable for its tall tower and spire, which survived the Blitz, stained glass windows, post-war architecture and fine Willis organ, which is amongst the largest of any church on the South Coast. The church is also notable for the sound of its bells, which inspired the song "The Bells of St. Mary's", originally recorded in 1919 by Frances Alda and later sung by Bing Crosby in a film of the same name.

== History ==
=== First church ===
The foundation of the first church on the site is believed to coincide with the visit of Saint Birinus to the port town of Hamwic in circa 634, on his mission to reconvert England to Christianity. This first church was a small, Saxon building that nevertheless controlled a large swathe of the town, from the River Itchen to what is now present-day Northam. The early history of this church is not well known, but it is believed by historians that during the reign of King Canute (1016–1035), the ancient town of Hamwic was moved to sit on the site of modern-day Southampton, close to the confluence of the Test and Itchen. The Saxon port town was abandoned, St Mary's Church with it.

=== Second church ===
The story of the rebuilding of the church in the 12th century comes from Leland's chronicle of 1546, where he explains that its reconstruction was ordered by Queen Matilda, wife of Henry I, owing to its poor condition. By this time, the first church had fallen into disrepair, except for a small chapel dedicated to Saint Nicholas, which was kept in use. This second incarnation of the church was dedicated to 'Our Lady Blessed Virgin Mary', and was known as the 'great church', signifying its significance as the mother church of the town despite being located outside the city walls.

There was, however, some dispute about its status. In 1281(??), a dispute emerged between the Precentor of St Mary's and the priests of the other churches in the town about whether the church should be the town's principal place of worship. The dispute was settled by the Bishop of Winchester, who sent his representative, Adam de Hales, to conduct an enquiry on the status of the various churches in the town. The result was that the churches of St Michael, Lawrence, John, Andrew, All Saints, and the Holy Trinity, took an oath stating St Mary's was the mother church.

In 1549, just three years after Leland's visit, much of the church was destroyed by order of the government commissioners, most likely as a punitive measure against the rector, William Capon, who went against the commissioners decision to confiscate the lands of the church. The Court Leet of 30 April 1549 stated that the rubble of the church should be used to create a new road from Bargate. The chancel was left intact.

In 1551, the remaining parts of the church's land and estates were, together with the church itself, leased to Robert Reniger, a former Sheriff of Southampton. One condition of the lease, which later passed to the Lambert family, was that the rector should receive £18 per year from use of the lands. The Lambert family occasionally gave towards the upkeep of the chancel, where services were still held.

=== Third and fourth churches ===
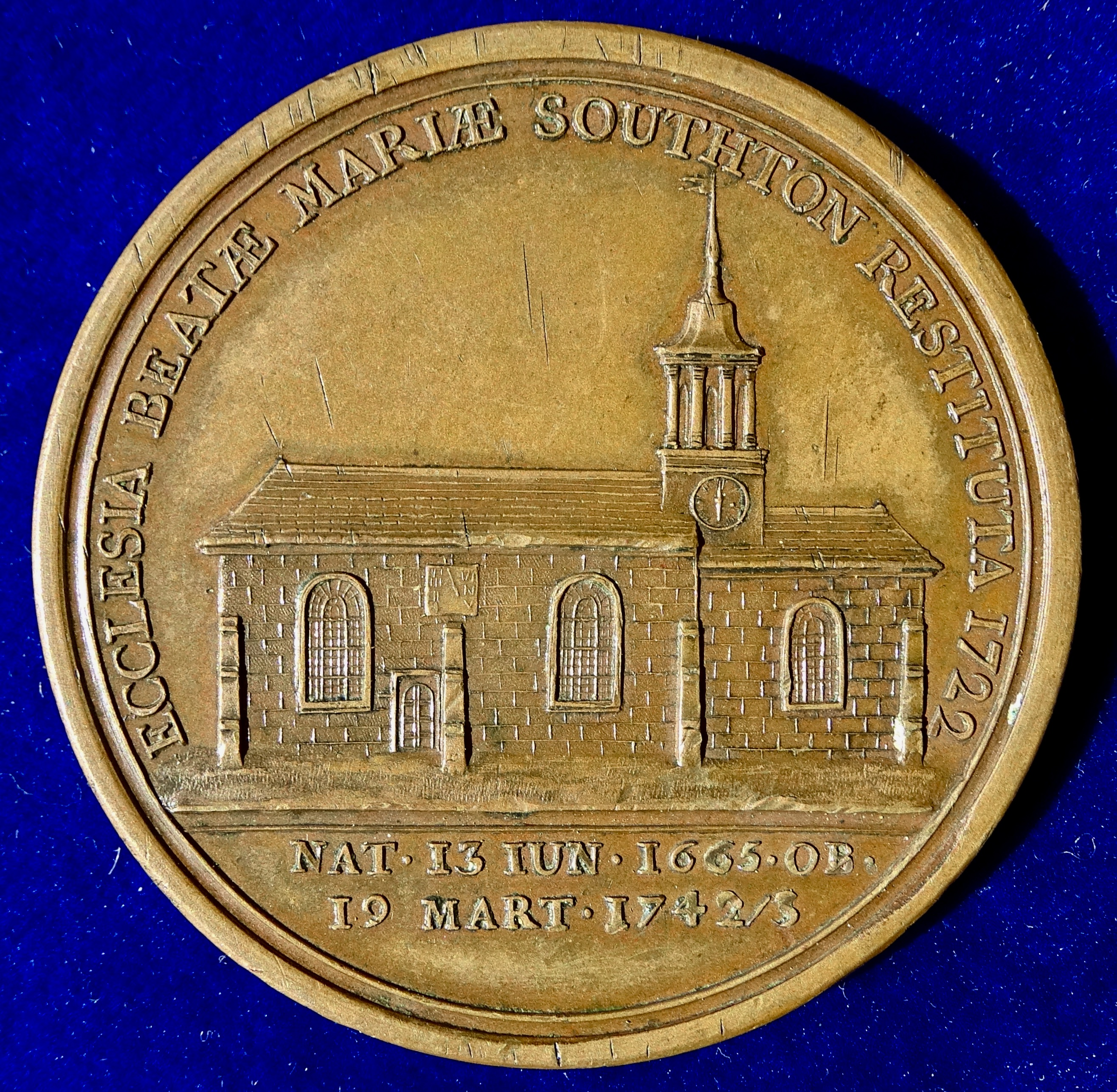
The reverse of the Brideoake memorial death medal 1743 by Dassier showing the new Church in 1722

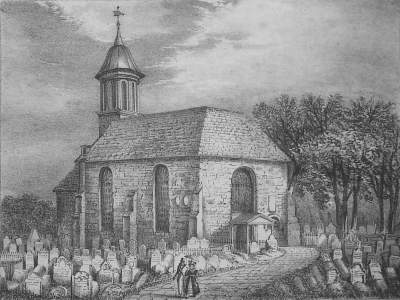
The church in circa 1790

By the turn of the 18th century, the church of St Mary was in poor and dilapidated condition. The incumbent, Doctor Clutterbuck, tried for several years to have the church rebuilt, but was unsuccessful. It fell to his successor, Ralph Brideoake, to rebuild the church. In this he succeeded, instigating of the building of a new nave in 1711 in the Georgian style, which cost £920. This was followed by the rebuilding of the chancel in 1723, at a cost of £400.

At the end of the 18th century, Southampton's population grew considerably, surpassing 10,000 by the time of the 1801 census. Consequently, the church building was remodelled, expanded and in places, rebuilt, under the auspices of Francis North, who became rector in 1797. Aisles were added to the nave externally and galleries added internally to cope with the growing population; the church was reconsecrated in 1833 by Charles Sumner, Bishop of Winchester.

A description of the church appeared in Picture of Southampton in 1850:

It has been recently enlarged by the addition of two wings; and is now in tolerable repair, but more remarkable for its bold defiance of all architectural propriety, than for any other characteristic: tall clustered columns being carried from the floor to support a horizontal beam or entablature close to the ceiling, whilst plain round windows contrast the pointed arch of the ancient chancel.

— Philip Brannon

The population continued to expand with the opening of Southampton Docks in 1838, which required houses to be built on church land. In 1831, the population reached over 22,000, and by 1861, it had almost tripled, to over 60,000. The church, although much rebuilt and restored in 1833, was beginning to show its age; the construction was of poor quality. This, combined with the rapidly expanding population, prompted the Bishop of Winchester, Samuel Wilberforce, whose son was also the rector, to strongly campaign for its replacement.

=== Fifth church ===
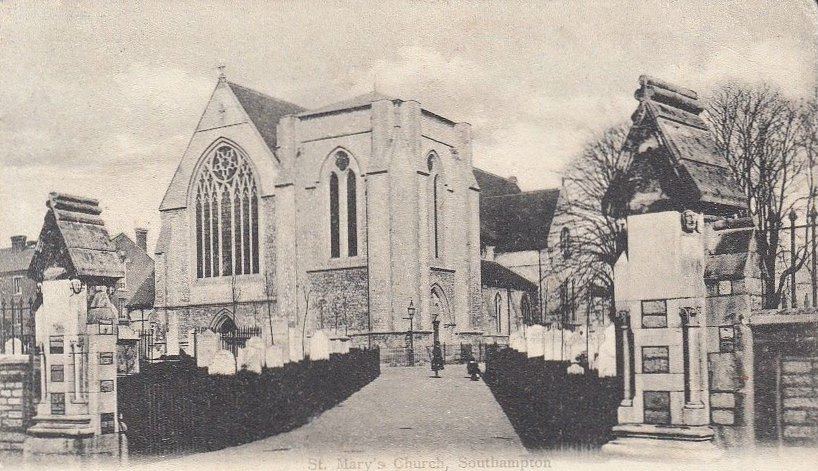
The church in circa 1900, with only the lower stage of the tower completed

In 1871, Bishop Wilberforce died unexpectedly, and thus the idea of rebuilding the church gained some momentum, with suggestions that it could be a memorial to Wilberforce. Consequently, William Wilberforce, his son, instructed the eminent architect of the age, George Edmund Street, to survey the church. Street's conclusion was damning: he condemned the entire structure. Street was employed as the architect of the new building.

Following fundraising efforts, the foundation stone was laid by Edward, Prince of Wales (later to be Edward VII), Alexandra, Princess of Wales, and their children on 12 August 1878, which became part of the north chancel aisle. The partially completed church was consecrated by Harold Browne, Bishop of Winchester, on 21 June 1879. The ceremony featured sermons by both the Archbishop of Canterbury, Archibald Campbell Tait, in the morning service, and the Archbishop of York, William Thomson in the evening; believed to be the only time in the history of the Church of England that both Archbishops have preached in the same church on the same day.

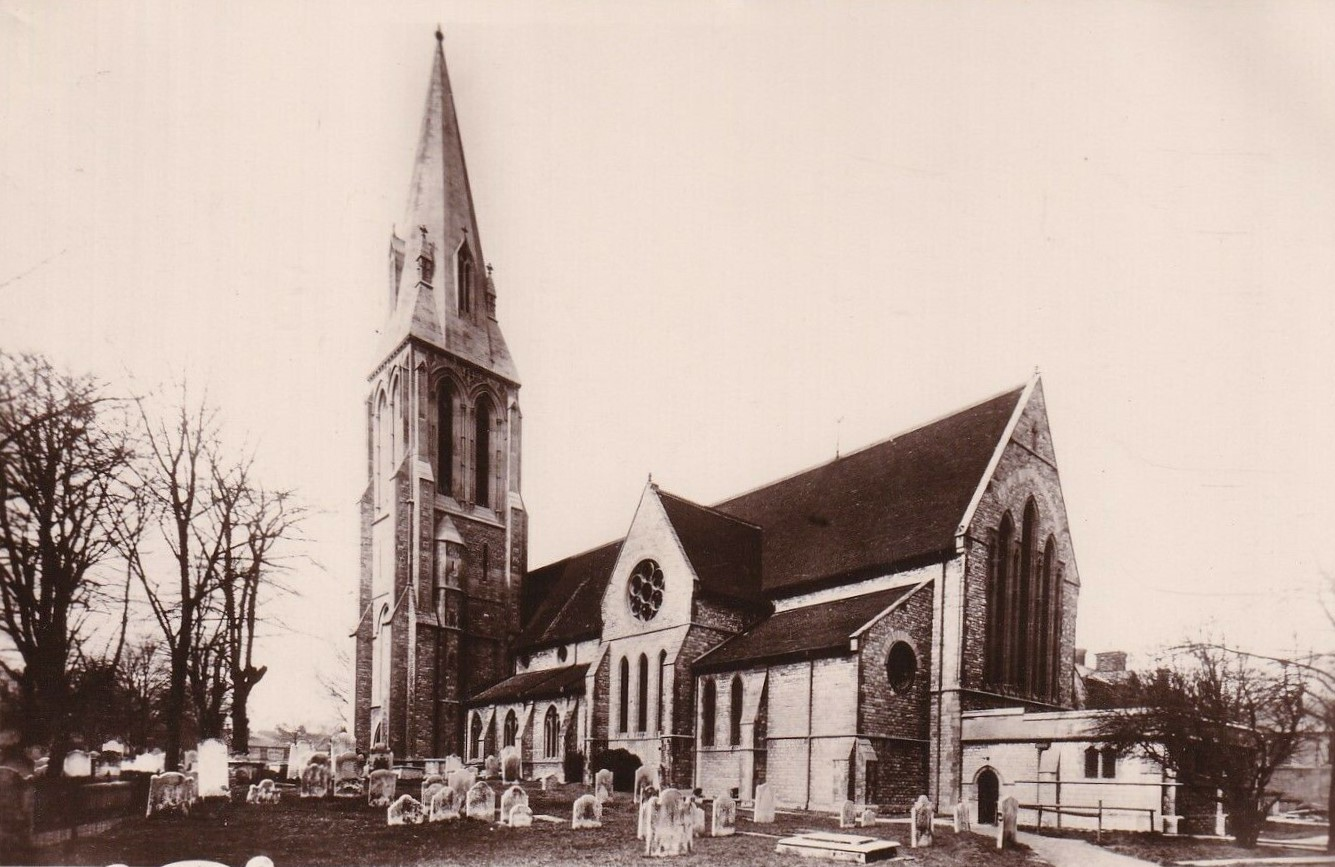
The church in circa 1920, completed, as Street intended

Construction continued until 1884, when the church was completed, save for the upper parts of the tower and spire, which had been designed but not constructed. Street himself died in 1881, but construction continued to his plan until it was completed. The church would not be fully completed for another 30 years, when under the auspices of the rector, Canon Lovett, the tower and spire were constructed, to Street's design, from 1912 to 1914. Lovett himself placed the weathervane on top of the spire on 5 January 1914; the completion had cost £2,562. The church, as completed, was in the High Gothic Revival style, with 13th century influences. The church had an aisled nave, north and south transepts, and chancel, with a high southwest tower, topped with a spire.

=== Sixth church ===
Southampton, due to its importance as a port city, was one of the prime targets by the Luftwaffe as part of the Blitz. Though the city was targeted by 57 separate raids, that on the night of 30 November 1940 was the most severe. St Mary's Church was hit several times by incendiaries, which started a fire that consumed most of the structure, despite the efforts of the rector and his team. When morning broke, the church was virtually ruinous, save for the tower, spire, and conical baptistery, which survived, albeit gutted internally. The lower walls also survived but most of the treasures, stained glass, roofs and fittings were destroyed.

When the war ended, much of the parish, and indeed the city, lay in ruins. It was felt by the council that the residential properties in the parish were more important. An offer of a new site to rebuild the church in East Park Terrace by the council in 1946 was turned down, and the diocese had reservations about funding such a large building when much of the country was still under rationing. It was decided by the church council, led by rector Canon Spencer Leeson, to restore the tower and spire, which were the only part of the church to remain standing, albeit in damaged form, to give hope for rebuilding in the future. The tower and spire were restored from 1945 to 1948 when the recast bells rang out once more. A service to dedicate the bells and the restored tower was held in the ruins in 1948.

The decision to rebuild the body of the church was not taken until the early 1950s. Construction took place from February 1954 to June 1956, retaining the overall ground plan of the church, as well as the lower walls and window designs, but with modern influences, under the design of architect Romilly Craze. The church was rededicated at a service on 12 June 1956, led by the Bishop of Winchester, with a congregation of 1,400 worshippers.

==== Modern history ====
In 2018, it was announced that the church would undergo an £800,000 renovation and a change in leadership, in order to modernise it and better attract a younger congregation. The internal alterations included the installation of a kitchen and servery, new lighting and sound systems, refurbishment of toilets, and a stage in the centre of the church. Many of the 1950s internal fittings were replaced, and a new font installed in the east end, as well as the restoration of the roof. As part of the modernisation, a church plant took place, with Holy Trinity Brompton installing a new vicar; the churchmanship also changed to Charismatic Evangelical.

== Architecture ==
=== Exterior and plan ===
Externally, the church follows the traditional cruciform plan, with an aisled nave and chancel, intersected by north and south transepts. There is also a small, conical baptistery at the west end of the north nave aisle, a tower at the same end of the south nave aisle, and vestries east of the chancel. The church building has a footprint of 1,117 square metres (12,020 sq ft), which according to the Church of England, makes it a "very large" church building.

The exterior is constructed mostly from Purbeck stone and ashlar, with Bath stone for decoration. Owing to being the work of three different architects, the exterior can best be described as "Neo-Cistercian", incorporating the lower walls of Street's church, the upper walls by Craze, and the tower and spire by Street's son, Arthur Edmund Street, based on his father's design. The dominant feature of the exterior is the massive tower and spire, which reach a height of 200 feet (61 m), making St Mary's the tallest church in Hampshire. Whilst Nikolaus Pevsner was critical of the body of the church following its rebuilding, he praised the tower and the spire, making a "splendid composition", calling it "one of the finest Victorian steeples in England".

The tower is formed of three stages, only the lower one was completed when the main body of the church was under construction, the upper two stages were constructed from 1912 to 1914. The lowest stage of the tower contains a richly moulded doorway in its southern face, above which are two, large Geometrical windows. The second stage of the tower contains a pair of lancet windows in each face, except for the eastern side, which only contains one, owing to the octagonal stair turret terminating on this side. The third, upper, stage contains pairs of massive louvred bell openings, spanning the entire height and width of the walls. The buttresses which rise from the ground terminate at this stage. The spire which starts at the top of the belfry, is of the broach type, starting with a square base and transitioning to an octagonal pinnacle. Where this transition takes place, louvred lucarnes pierce the spire.

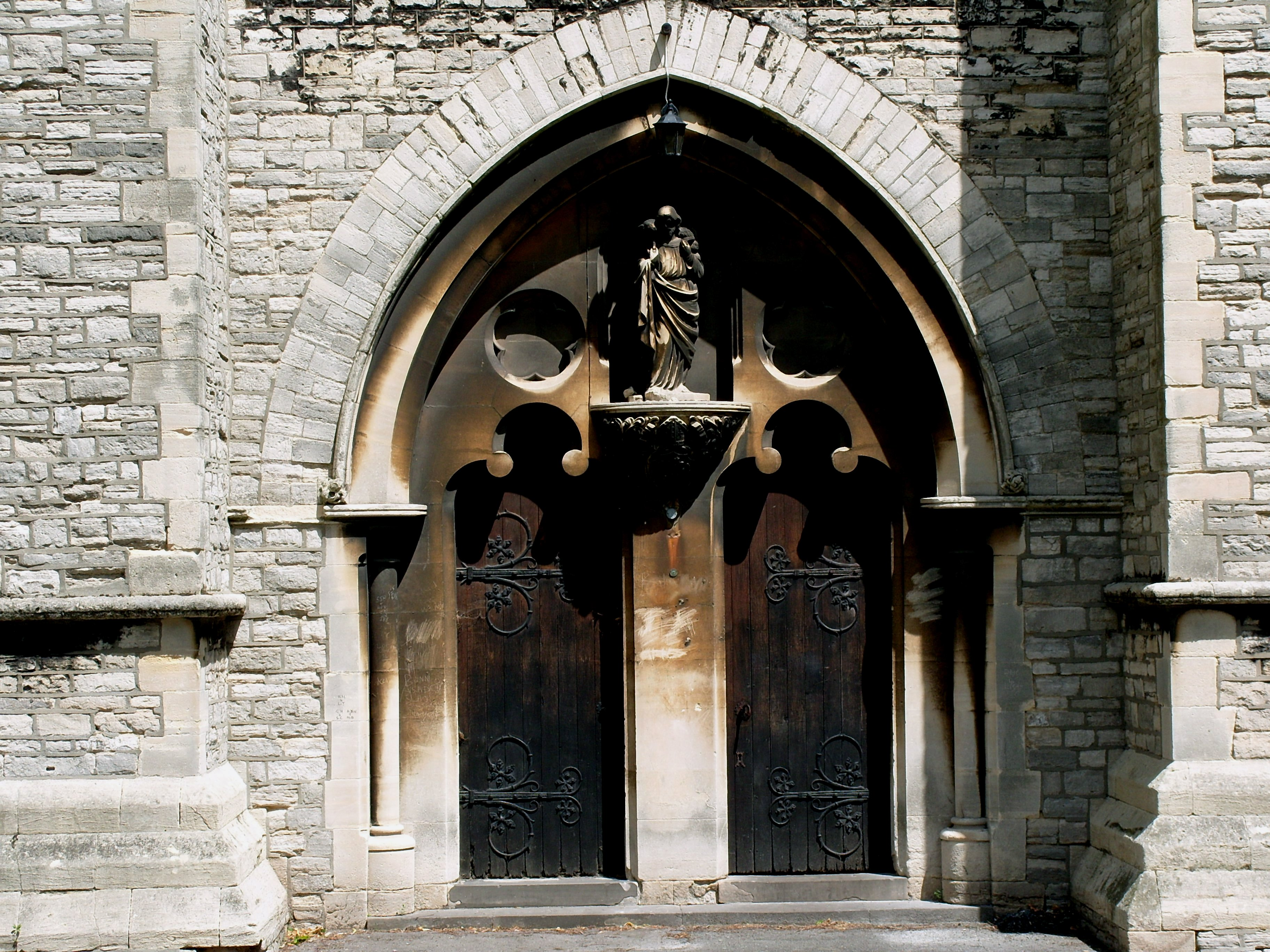
Detail on door decoration

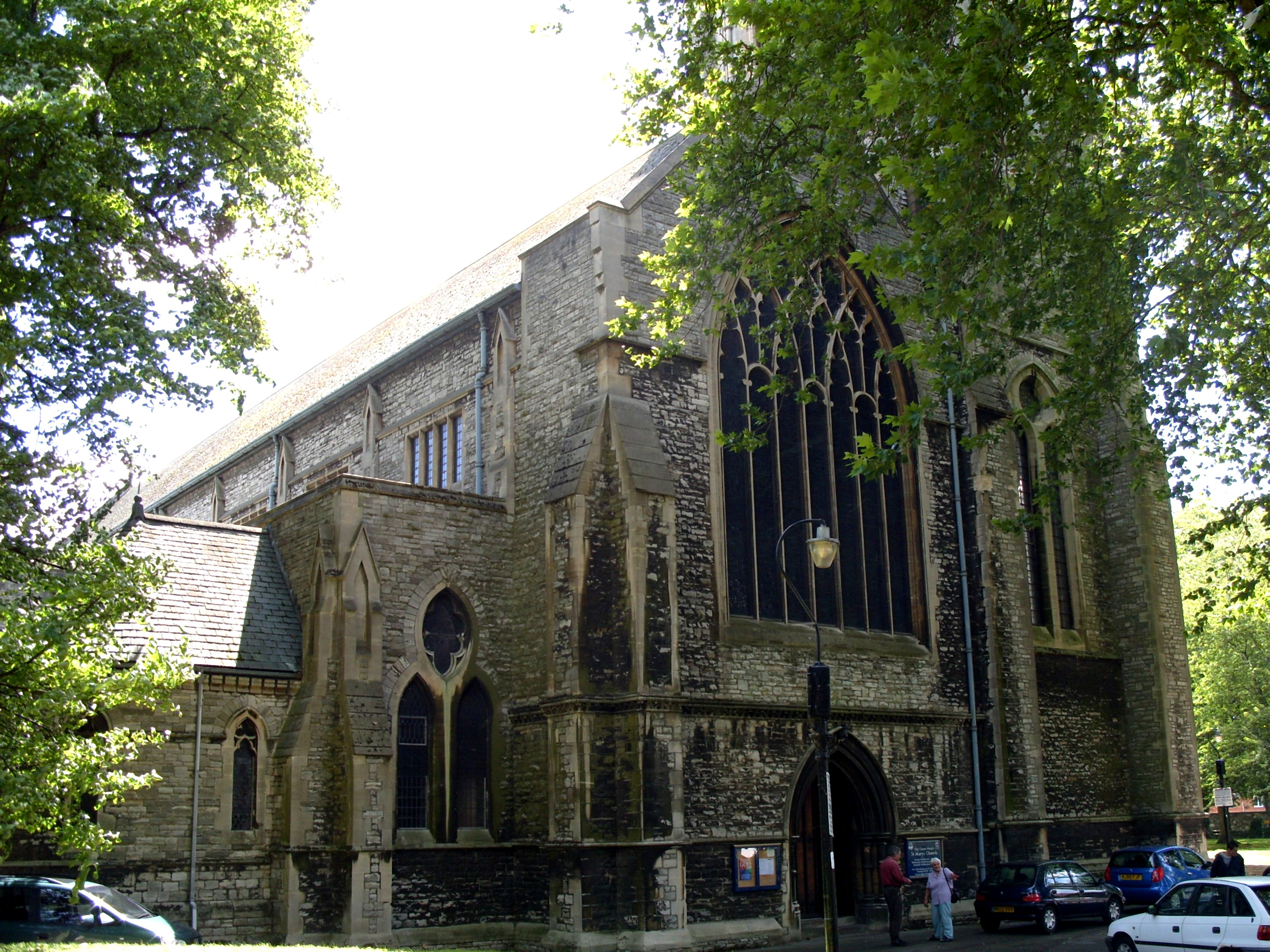
West front, baptistery on the left

=== Interior ===
==== Overview ====
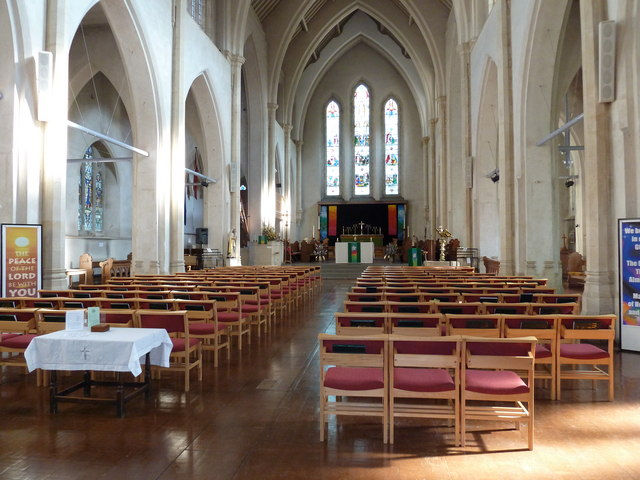
Interior, pre-remodelling of 2018

Unlike the exterior, which retains several features of Street's church, the interior mostly reflects Craze's post-war rebuilding. The interior is lofty and spacious, but relatively plain, with high, bare arches spanning the interior. Entering the church through the main entrance below the west window, the conical baptistery is on the left, the only internal part of the church, other than the tower, to survive unaltered from before the bombing. The tower vestibule is on the right, lit by two large Geometrical windows above which is a stone quadripartite vault. The baptistery also contains a quadripartite vault, painted in blue and gold.

The main body of the church is seven bays in length: four for the nave, two for the chancel and one for the crossing. The roof is open to the rafters here, braced on massive arches which spring from slender columns on the nave arcade. The north and south transepts are slightly lower in height than the nave and chancel, and are formed of one bay each. Beyond the crossing, the Seafarers' Chapel occupies the end of the north chancel aisle, whilst the organ occupies the south chancel aisle. The Seafarers' Chapel commemorates the seafaring history of the port of Southampton, decorated with a nautical theme; at the entrance to the chapel are hung the house flags of many of the shipping companies that used the port and a ship's binnacle serves as a lectern.

==== Windows ====
One of the church's most notable features is its stained glass windows. Though many of the windows were consumed by the fire the bombing caused in November 1940, there are several notable survivors. The baptistery retains all of its original glass, containing five windows made by Clayton & Bell. These windows depict various biblical figures, including Moses, Christ, Noah, and Philip. The majority of the remaining windows, though containing modern glass, retain Street's tracery, except for the clerestory, which is of Craze's design.

Notable modern windows include the four principal windows, that of the western, eastern, northern, and southern facades. Two of these windows, the main west and east windows, have glass designed by Gerald E. Smith of London. The largest of these is the west window, containing seven lights in the Decorated Gothic style, depicting Christ in Majesty with many background scenes. The east window is Early English in style, consisting of three tall lancets depicting scenes from the Bible post-Resurrection.

The south transept window is formed of two parts, a triplet of large lancets in the lower half and a rose window in the upper half. The glass in these two windows was designed and made by James Clark & Eaton of Bournemouth. The three lancets depict religious symbols and Hiram I, whilst the rose window depicts further biblical symbols. The north transept window is simpler in design, formed of a single, large, geometrical window, designed by Christopher Webb and depicting Saint Barnabas.

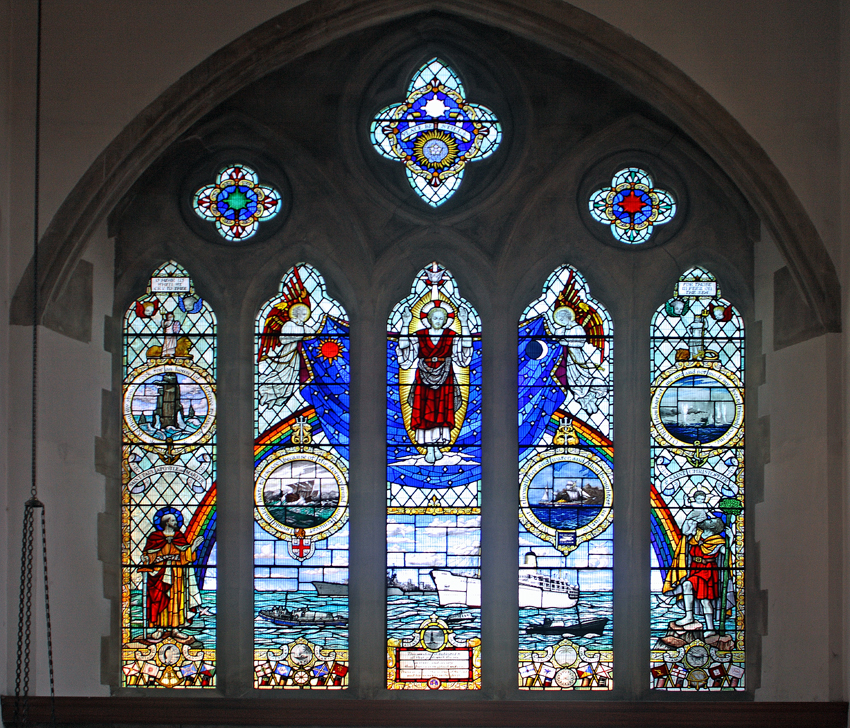
Seafarers' Chapel window

Two further windows in the church are nautical in theme. The large, five-light window in the Seafarers' Chapel is Decorated Gothic in style and contains glass by Smith again, this time depicting Christ over the sea, looking down on modern ships. In May 2018, a memorial window commemorating the 100th anniversary of the Titanic disaster was completed and installed. The window, originally designed as part of the Worshipful Company of Glaziers’ Stevens Competition, was created by Louise Hemmings of Ark Stained Glass. Made using traditional stained glass techniques, the window depicts an angel rising from the waters holding a scroll that says "the crew". Below the angel are 669 coloured orbs, each one depicting a loss of life from Southampton on the Titanic. A quotation from the Song of Solomon runs along the lowest edge of the window, "many waters cannot quench love", and the Titanic's name and date of sinking appear in the upper part of the window.

== Organ ==
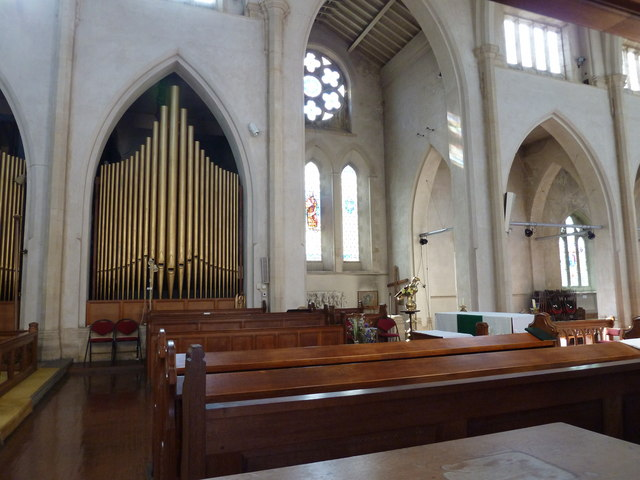
Organ, in the south chancel aisle

The earliest record of an organ at the church comes at the time of the rebuilding by Street from 1878 to 1884. Whilst the church was under construction, a large organ was provided at the cost of £1,300 by Henry Willis & Sons. This instrument contained three manuals, and following amendments and additions by Willis in 1885 and 1894, contained 38 stops. In 1931, the company rebuilt the organ, adding six further stops, bringing the total to 44, and also converted it to electric action. This organ was destroyed when the church was bombed in 1940.

The replacement instrument for this organ, which is still in use today, is a substantial Willis organ, mostly comprising new pipe work from 1956. The organ includes some pipework from the former Willis instrument at Albert Halls in Stirling, dating back to 1883. It has remained virtually unaltered since its installation, except for repairs to the Great, Choir, and Pedal organs following a roof leak in 1994. The organ is amongst the largest and finest of any church on the South Coast of England, comprising 3,383 pipes controlled by 61 speaking stops over three manuals plus pedalboard. The instrument is located in the south chancel aisle.

== Bells ==
=== Original bells ===
Though there are no records of bells in the first four incarnations of the church building, it is likely it had at least one bell, as was common with many churches. An engraving of the church in the 18th century shows it had a small tower topped by a cupola, where bells, if any, would likely have been hung. When the fifth incarnation of the building was under construction from 1878 to 1884, only the lowest stage of the tower was completed, as far as the stone vault visible from the church, too low to contain any bells. It was not until 1913, when the tower was raised to its full height, that bells were able to be installed within it. Though over £2,500 had been raised so that the tower and spire would be completed, it required a donation of almost £1,000 by a local resident, Mary Ann Wingrove, so that a peal of bells could be provided. Wingrove's donation was in memory of her late husband, Robert, and a metal plaque at the base of the tower records her gift.

The initial ring of bells was a fine-toned ring of eight from the John Taylor & Co foundry in Loughborough, costing £909. The bells were cast in 1914 and each bell records the church's thanks to Wingrove for her donation. The bells were hung in 1914 in a new cast iron frame with fittings including metal headstocks and plain bearings. The first full peal on the bells was on 8 January 1916, comprising 5,040 changes of Grandsire Triples, rung in 3 hours and 13 minutes, to commemorate the fallen of the First World War. The largest bell of this ring weighed 22 long cwt (1,100 kg). The bells were the third ring of eight in Southampton, after Holy Rood and St Michael's churches.

Douglas Furber and the Australian composer A. Emmett Adams heard the bells sounding across the River Itchen while waiting for their ocean liner, and were inspired to write the song "The Bells of St. Mary’s". Introduced to the United States in 1917 as the college song of the New York State Maritime College, it achieved international popularity when recorded by Bing Crosby on 2 March 1946.

In 1933, thanks to a donation by the Barron Bell Trust, the ring of eight was augmented to a ring of ten with two, lighter, treble bells. John Taylor & Co cast the new bells and hung them in a cast-iron extension frame above the existing ring of eight. Due to the advances in technology since 1914, these bells were hung with ball bearings, rather than the plain bearings of the existing ring. The new bells were dedicated on 13 January 1934.

=== Current bells ===
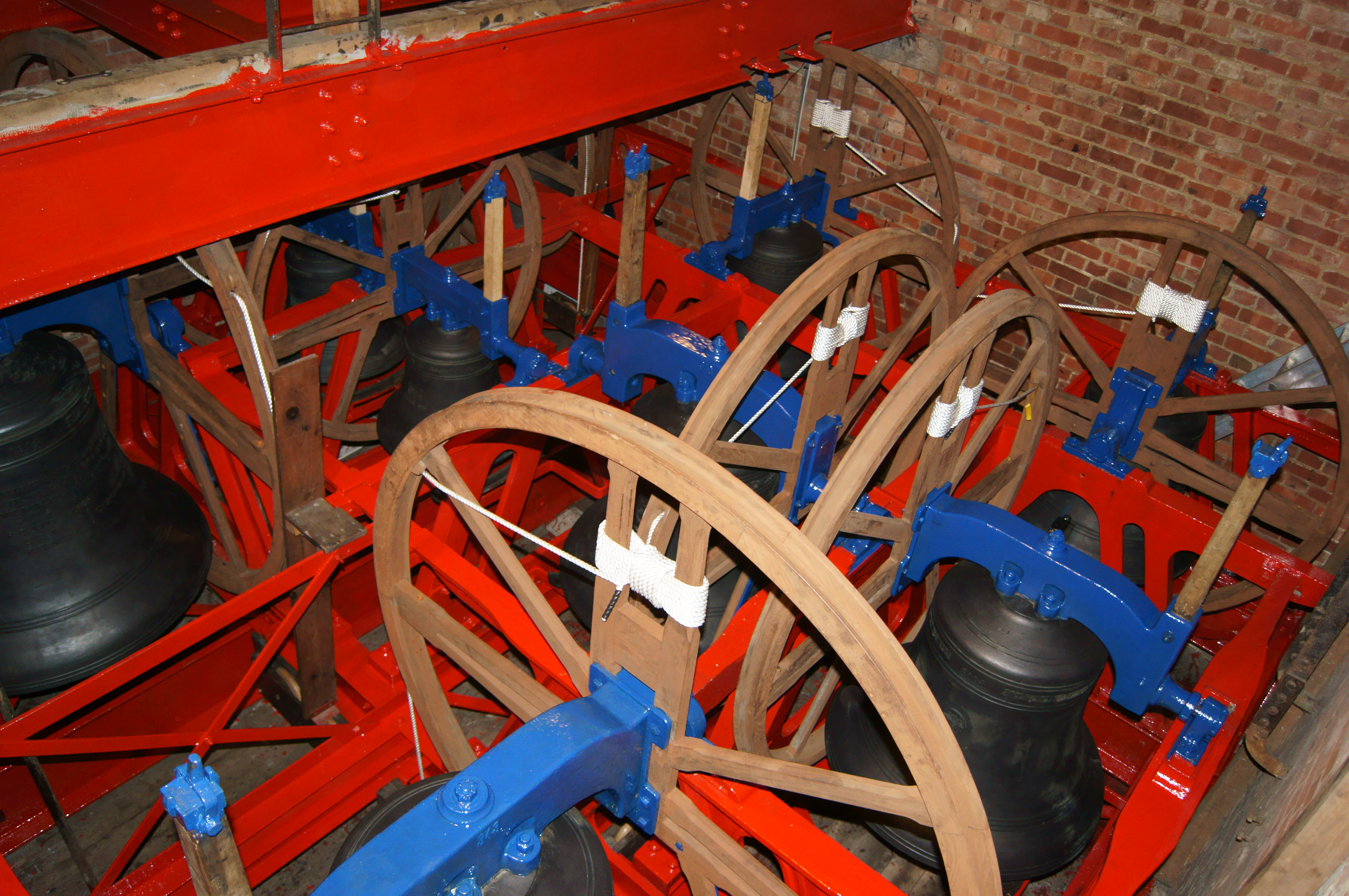
The current ring of bells, following frame repainting in 2014

The original ring of bells were destroyed in the bombing on 30 November 1940. Though the tower and spire were not struck by bombs themselves, the fire from the church was fanned into it, gutting the interior of the tower. The sixth bell fell through two floors and landed in the ringing chamber, where it broke. During an inspection in March 1941 by Taylor's foundry, it was found that the fifth, eighth, and ninth bells had gaping cracks and the seventh had lost its resonance. The bells were removed in 1942 for recasting at a future time when the tower might be ready to receive them. Following the Victory in Europe (VE Day) celebrations, all ten bells were recast in Loughborough, becoming the first ring of bells in the country that were destroyed by enemy bombing to be restored.

It had been hoped to reuse the original frame for the new bells, but inspections in 1946 showed fire damage had weakened it, so it was removed and replaced, except for the 1934 extension, which was left in-situ. Taylor's recast ring of bells were of similar dimensions to the original bells, the tenor bell now weighing 21 long cwt 2 qrs 8 lbs (2,416 lb or 1,096 kg) and striking the note E^{b}. All ten bells were rehung in the restored tower in 1948 in a new cast iron frame, this time with all ten bells on one level. New fittings were provided throughout, including ball bearings.

The bells were rededicated and rung for the first time at a service held in the ruins of the church on 20 June 1948. A report in The Ringing World describes the new bells as being of "splendid tone". The church's bells have remained essentially as installed in 1948, but received major maintenance by the local ringers in summer 2014. Taking 38 days to complete, the work included the stripping down of the fittings, removing them of rust and repainting them, acoustic work in the tower, and the installation of an electronically operated sound control floor, so that the volume of the bells outside the church can be lowered for recreational ringing. The bells are well-regarded for their rich sound, seeing visitors from across the country. Other rings of bells were cast by John Taylor & Co to the same dimensions as St Mary's a few years later, including at Mount St Alphonsus in Limerick in 1947, and St Peter's Church in Evercreech in 1948.

== Football club ==
In 1880, the St. Mary's church football team, founded by the church curate, Rev. Arthur Baron Sole, began playing on the Deanery field, behind the present vicarage. By November 1885, the Deanery club had folded and a new club was founded by members of the St. Mary's Church of England Young Men's Association playing as "St. Mary's Young Men's Association F.C."; this became simply "St. Mary's F.C." in 1887–88, before adopting the name "Southampton St. Mary's F.C." when the club joined the Southern League in 1894. After they won the Southern League title in 1896–97, the club became a limited company and changed its name to "Southampton F.C." which has maintained its ecclesiastical connection via its nickname "The Saints". From 1887 to 1896, the church was the club's landlord, being the owners of their first permanent home at the Antelope Ground, situated at the northern end of St. Mary's Road.
