= Holyrood Elementary School =

School in Edmonton, Canada

Coordinates: 53.5307°N 113.4491°W

Holyrood Elementary with playground in foreground

Holyrood Elementary School is a bilingual school in Edmonton, Alberta, Canada named after Holyrood Palace in Edinburgh, Scotland. The school is located in a south-east Edmonton neighborhood of the same name.

== History ==
Holyrood School opened in 1955 when Edmonton was growing rapidly due to the Post-World War II baby boom and discovery of oil near Edmonton in 1947. Holyrood introduced French immersion and Ukrainian bilingual programs in the 1970s, to make it a trilingual school. Holyrood no longer has the Ukrainian bilingual program due to low enrolment, and now only offers French Immersion and English.
