= Southampton Blitz =

WWII aerial bombardment of British port city

- Part of the Strategic bombing campaign of World War II
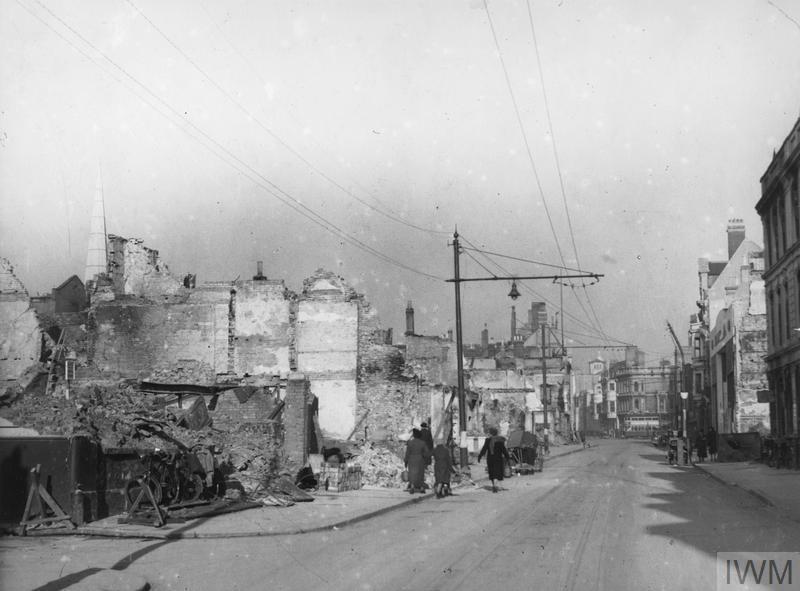
- Damage in Southampton following the Blitz
Date	1940–1944
Location	Southampton, Hampshire, England
Result	Southampton heavily damaged by German air raids

Belligerents
Nazi Germany	United Kingdom

Casualties and losses
Unknown	631 people died, 898 people were seriously wounded, and 979 people less seriously injured.

The Southampton Blitz was the heavy bombing of Southampton by the Nazi German Luftwaffe during World War II. Southampton was a strategic bombing target for the Luftwaffe as it contained both busy docks with associated business premises and factories and the Supermarine factory building Spitfires in Woolston. Being a large port city on the south coast it was within easy reach of German airfields in France.

During the war, 57 attacks on the city were made, but over 1,500 air raid warnings were issued. According to the Air Raid Precautions (ARP) Department approximately 2,300 bombs were dropped amounting to over 470 tonnes of high explosives. Over 30,000 incendiary devices were dropped on the city with nearly 45,000 buildings damaged or destroyed, with most of the city's High Street being hit. 631 people died, 898 people were seriously wounded, and 979 people less seriously injured during the Southampton Blitz. Southampton also lost 12.5% of its housing stock – more than any other city in the UK.

== Spitfire factory ==
The Supermarine factory building manufacturing Spitfires in Woolston was a target in the city. On 24 and 26 September 1940, the Luftwaffe bombed the riverside factory during two day-time raids. Much of the factory was destroyed and 110 people were killed. Northam gasworks was also targeted on 26 September and 11 workers were killed in the raid.

== Civic Centre ==
A daylight raid on 6 November 1940 targeted the city's Civic Centre. Hermann Goering, head of the Luftwaffe, had remarked that the Civic Centre appeared like a "piece of cake" from the air, and that he was going to "cut himself a slice". During the raid, twelve bombs were dropped, including a direct hit on the Civic Centre with a 500lb high explosive. The bomb penetrated to the lower floors of the art gallery killing 35 people, including 15 children, who were having an art lesson in the basement.

== Blitz ==
Of the 57 air raids, by far the worst were on 23 and 30 November and 1 December 1940 and these attacks are generally referred to as "Southampton's Blitz". Starting at 18:15, or 6:15 P.M, and running until midnight on the evening of 23 November, 77 people were killed and over 300 injured with the Civic Centre taking much of the brunt of the attack. The scale of the raid ruined the city's water supply and many of the fires had to be left to burn themselves out.

There were reports that the glow of the firestorm of Southampton burning could be seen from as far away as Cherbourg on the coast of France. Nazi publicity declared in propaganda that the city had been left a smoking ruin.

A week later, 120 German bombers returned for a further six-hour attack on the evening of 30 November. The 800 bombs dropped on the city left 137 dead, 96 killed in their air raid shelters. Major buildings including Pirelli Cable Works, the Daily Echo newspaper building and the General Motors factory were severely damaged or destroyed. All Saints', Holyrood and St. Mary's churches, were destroyed, although St. Michael's escaped with only minor damage, allegedly because the spire was used by the German bombers as a landmark and their pilots were ordered not to hit it. Altogether, Southampton lost seven churches during the blitz, as well as the Audit House, the Ordnance Survey offices and many shops, factories and homes.

The last casualties of air raids in the city were in a small raid on the suburbs of the city in May 1941 and on 8 July 1941 in the area of Victory Crescent, Millbrook, killing three people. The last major raid of over 50 bombers was in June 1942. There were occasional tip and run raids and in 1944 two V1 flying bombs in mid-July were the last enemy ordnance to fall in the city.

== Victims ==
631 people died, 898 people were seriously wounded, and 979 less seriously injured during the Southampton Blitz. Southampton also lost 12.5% of its housing stock – more than any other city in the UK.

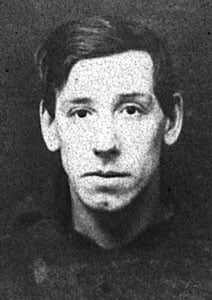
Edgar L. Perry, Titanic crew member, died in the Blitz

Among the victims was Edgar L. Perry, who had signed on as a coal trimmer on board the RMS Titanic in 1912 and survived the sinking. Perry perished along with his wife Rose and 14 other people died when an air raid shelter suffered a direct hit on 1 December 1940.
