= Holyrood estate =

Housing estate in Southampton, England

Coordinates: 50.9005°N 1.3995°W

The Holyrood estate is a housing estate in Southampton, England. It was constructed as a new city district to replace a slum bombed in World War II, and designed by Lyons Israel Ellis, who later designed Wyndham Court. Owen Hatherley describes the estate as a "straightforward scattering of low and medium-rise Modernist blocks, using the soft-Brutalist vernacular of stock-brick and concrete." Hatherley praises the estate's layout over its aesthetic. The estate is situated between Queensway to the west and Threefield Lane to the east, and Bernard Street to the south and Lime Street to the north.

In 2009, a series of metal sculptures were erected around the estate in tribute to the area's role in the history of Southampton. Holyrood Church, which was damaged in World War II, now serves as a memorial to the Merchant Navy. In 2012 seven tiled murals depicting scenes from Southampton's history were installed on the estate's blocks, to be visible from main roads.

R&B musician Craig David, who was born in 1981, grew up in the Holyrood estate.
