= Holyrood Church =

Holyrood Church, Southampton
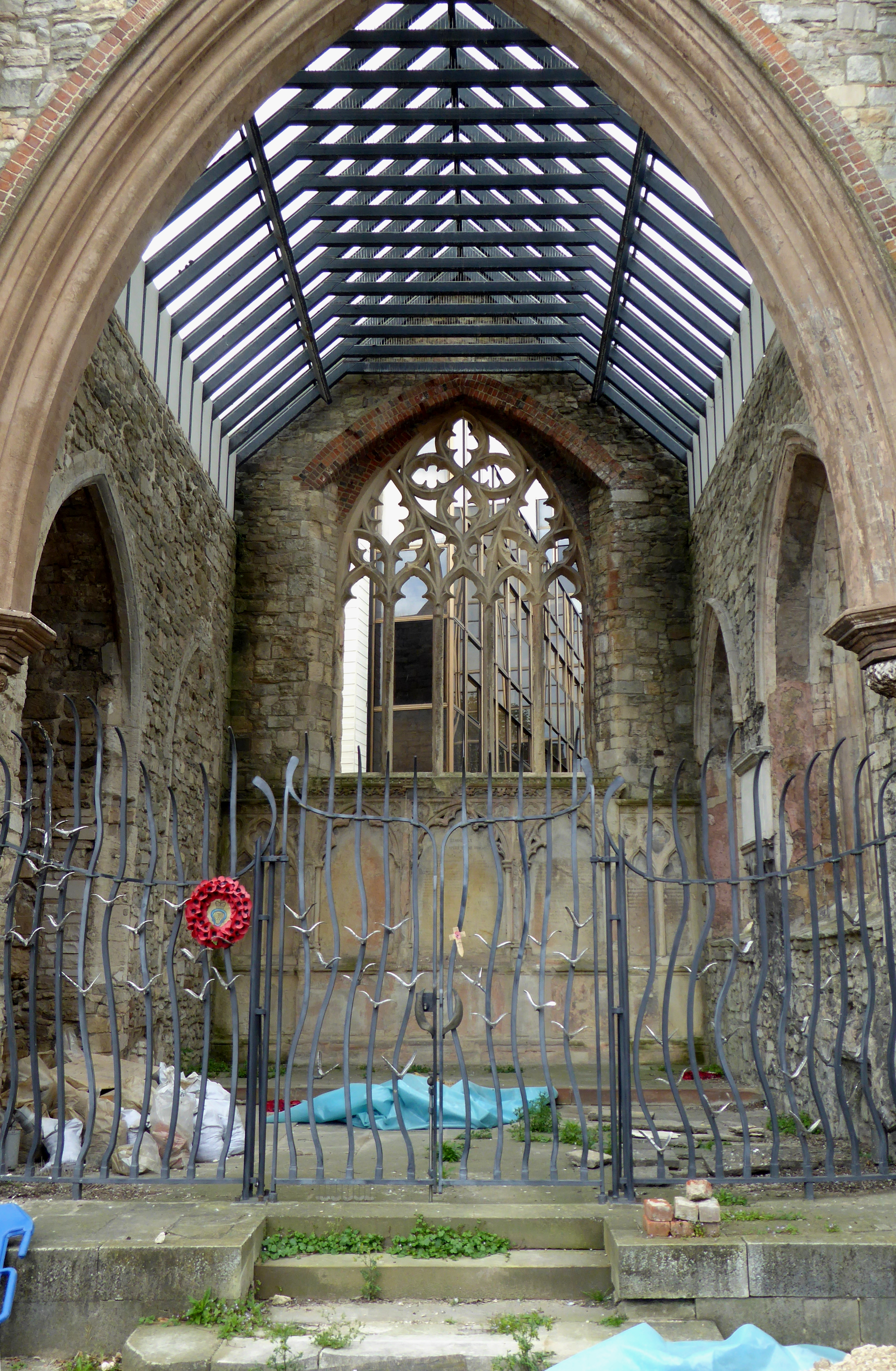
- Holyrood Church, Southampton

- Shown within Southampton
- 50°53′59″N 1°24′13″W
- OS grid reference: SU 42045 11300
- Location: Southampton, Hampshire
- Country: England
- Denomination: Anglican

History
- Founded: 1320
- Dedication: Holy Cross

Architecture
- Functional status: Merchant Navy Memorial
- Heritage designation: Listed building – Grade II*
- Designated: 14 July 1953
- Architectural type: Church
- Style: Medieval

Specifications
- Capacity: 974 (1851 Census)

Holyrood Church (or Holy Rood Church) was one of the original five churches serving the old walled town of Southampton, England. Built in 1320, the church was destroyed by enemy bombing during the blitz in November 1940. In 1957 the shell of the church was dedicated as a memorial to the sailors of the Merchant Navy. It is a Grade II* listed building.

== History ==
The first documentary evidence of the existence of Holyrood was in 1160 when Henry II granted the Chapels of St. Michael, Holyrood, St. Lawrence and All Saints' to the monks of St. Denys. The name of the church, "Holy Rood", indicates its Saxon origins; if the church had been founded after the Norman Conquest, it would have been named "St. Cross".

The original church was situated in the centre of the High Street, then known as "English Street", but in 1320, the church was pulled down and rebuilt on its present site on the eastern side of the road.

During the Middle Ages, the church was situated at the centre of the town and was the parish church for the south-eastern quarter. As such, it became a focal point for life in the town and was used as a place of worship by crusaders en route to the Holy Land, soldiers heading for Agincourt in 1415 and Philip II of Spain in 1554 on his way to marry Queen Mary at Winchester Cathedral.

In his 1801 "Walk Through Southampton", Sir Henry Englefield describes Holy Rood thus:

Holy Rood Church... has been much altered on the outside, but does not seem ever to have been of elegant architecture. The west window is deprived of its tracery, and the tower, which is rather uncommonly situated at the south-west angle of the church, is void of beauty. The doors of the central entrance are very neatly ornamented with Gothic tracery, in a good style, and well preserved. The colonnade which runs along the whole front is by the lower class of inhabitants known by the name of the "Proclamation." The church within is large and handsome, but its appearance is much injured by the organ and its loft, which totally obstruct the view into the chancel. The... chancel extends beyond the side aisles, and has handsome windows on each side, though those to the north are now blocked up by houses. The east window is large, but, like the west window, is deprived of its tracery. A few shattered fragments of fine painted glass appear in some of the windows. In the middle of the chancel stands a handsome brass eagle desk. The font, which has been removed from its ancient place near the church door, and now stands under the organ loft, is octagonal, and adorned with niches in a neat, though plain, Gothic style.

By 1841, the organ had been moved to the western end of the church. In "The Market Towns of Hampshire" written in 1841, the church was described thus:

Holy Rhood church, a large and ancient structure, consists of a nave with side aisles and a choir or chancel; it has a tower and spire at the south-west angle, and a colonnade or portico, which occupies the whole front. The church contains several stalls of neat workmanship, a wooden screen of the time of Elizabeth or James I, a neat Gothic font, and some fragments of fine painted glass in the windows.

In 1848–49 the vicar, Reverend William Wilson, set about restoring the church, retaining parts of the 14th century chancel and aisles and the south-west tower and spire. At the same time, the wooden Doric colonnade, known locally as the "Proclamation", which stood immediately outside the church was demolished. Wilson's efforts turned Holyrood from a quiet run down church on the corner of Bernard Street to a very popular church.

Writing in 1850, Philip Brannon said:

Holyrood Church, with the exception of the chancel and tower, is newly rebuilt, or rather restored, in a manner that reflects the highest credit on the Vicar and committee who promoted, and on the architect, builder, and carver who executed the work. The effect of the interior is very fine; the rich tracery of the great west window – the lofty pointed arches between the body and the aisles, with the neat clerestories above them – the ancient chancel – and the open timber roof – produce a very imposing whole, judiciously preserved by the position of the organ, which does not here obtrude a heavy square mass on the sight, blinding other principal features, but is placed on the right.

In the census of 1851, it was recorded that the church had a seating capacity of 974, with 462 attending morning service and 405 in the evening.

Over the next 90 years, local residents would flock to hear the services and sermons, and it became the place in which to see the New Year in, with the church also becoming known as the "Church of the Sailors".

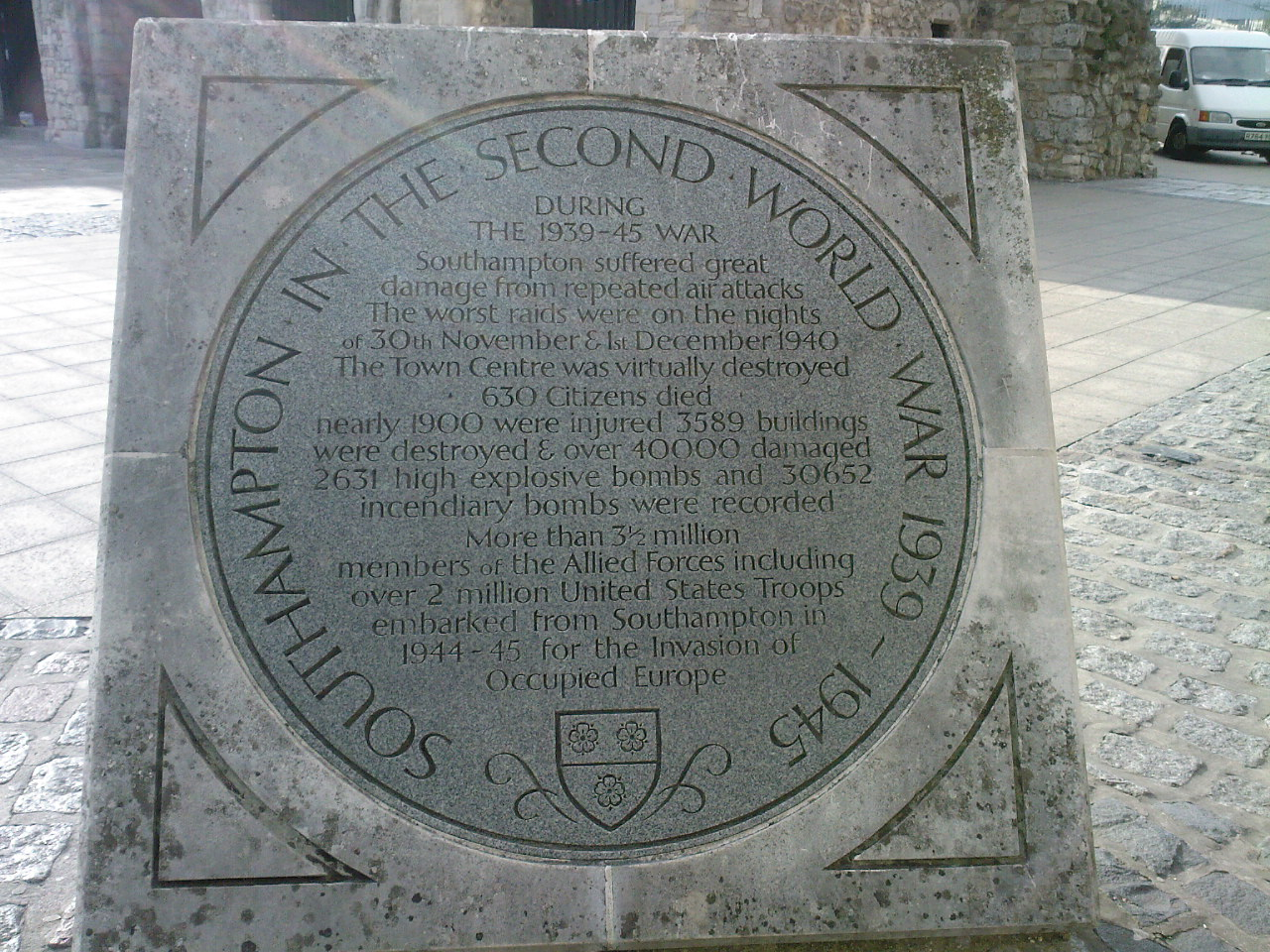
Southampton in the second world war

During the night of 30 November 1940, the centre of Southampton became the target for German bombers, when 800 high explosive bombs and 9,000 incendiaries were dropped on the town centre. In this attack, and that a week earlier, 214 people were killed and nearly 500 properties were totally destroyed. By the morning, Holyrood was a smoking ruin and St. Mary's church was gutted, although nearby St. Michael's survived unscathed. Southampton lost seven churches during the blitz, as well as the nearby Audit House, the Ordnance Survey offices and many shops, factories and homes. During the blitz, the beautiful 14th/early 15th century brass lectern was rescued from the ruins and is now fully restored in St. Michael's.

In 1957, the ruins of the church were restored and dedicated as a memorial to Merchant Navy seafarers and the ruins of the church were scheduled as an ancient monument.

By 2004, because of the exposure of internal features to the elements and problems with the structure, the church was in danger of collapsing. As a result, a grant of £670,000 was received from the Heritage Lottery Fund to repair the tower and the chancel, with a new lighting scheme being installed to make the former church a feature of Southampton's night skyline. The Merchant Navy Association contributed a further £5,000 to the repair fund "to enable (merchant seamen) to remember their colleagues and careers in an appropriate high quality setting".

== Holyrood today ==
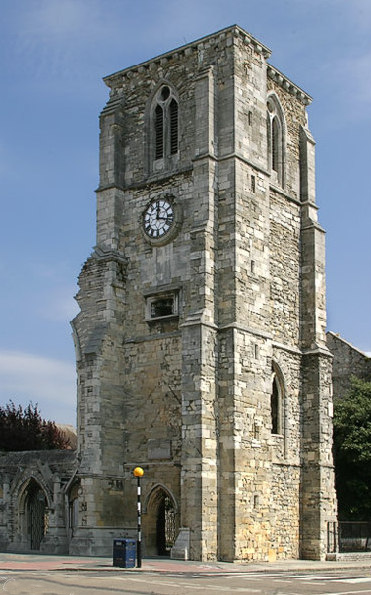
Holyrood Church, Southampton.

Following the destruction of the church during the blitz, the only parts of the church still standing are the tower at the south-western corner and the chancel at the eastern end, together with large parts of the north walls. The wooden spire was lost as was the great west window, whilst the central area of the church was completely destroyed.

On the west face of the tower there is a memorial plaque to Charles Dibdin (1745–1814) described as a "native of Southampton, poet, dramatist and composer, author of Tom Bowling, Poor Jack and other sea songs". Above the plaque are the clock and church bells, which feature pre-1760 Quarter jacks, small figures that strike the quarters of each hour.

Inside the church, under the tower is a memorial fountain, erected in 1912–13 for those who lost their lives in the sinking of the RMS Titanic, which was removed from its original site in Cemetery Road on Southampton Common. The fountain is supported on four stone columns, with a curved pediment on each side with carvings depicting the "Titanic", surmounted by a four-columned cupola.

The memorial is augmented by audioposts installed in 2007, from which can be selected historical recordings made by the Southampton Oral History Unit which "give the listener a very real impression of what the now ruined church looked like before the war and what that area meant to those who loved it".

The whole edifice is dedicated to the men of the Merchant Navy and hosts the annual Merchant Navy Day memorial service; in the corner of the former nave is an anchor behind which is a plaque bearing the legend:

The church of Holyrood erected on this site in 1320 was damaged by enemy action on 30 Nov 1940. Known for centuries as the church of the sailors the ruins have been preserved by the people of Southampton as a memorial and garden of rest, dedicated to those who served in the Merchant Navy and lost their lives at sea.

As part of the improvements in 2004–06, funded by the Heritage Lottery Fund, the artist metal worker, Charles Normandale created a series of wrought iron metal screens, gates and railings for the Chancel and Titanic Memorial Fountain. The chancel, now with a glass roof, and nave are used for temporary exhibitions and musical events.

== See also ==
- Holyrood estate
