= Cross House =

Cross House may refer to:

== Places and structures ==
=== United Kingdom ===
- Cross House, Linlithgow, a Category A listed building in West Lothian, Scotland
- Cross House, Southampton, a Grade II listed building in Southampton
- Cross House, Tewkesbury, a Grade II* listed building in the Borough of Tewkesbury

=== United States ===
- T. D. Cross House, Safford, Arizona, listed on the NRHP in Graham County, Arizona
- Cross House (Beebe, Arkansas), NRHP-listed
- Williams House (Odessa, Delaware), also known as Cross House, NRHP-listed
- Col. H.C. and Susan Cross House, Emporia, Kansas, listed on the NRHP in Lyon County, Kansas
- Cross Manor, St. Inigoes, Maryland, NRHP-listed
- Hamilton Cross House, Stillwater, Oklahoma, listed on the NRHP in Payne County, Oklahoma
- Harvey Cross House, Oregon City, Oregon, NRHP-listed
- Curtis Cross House, Salem, Oregon, NRHP-listed
- Orndoff-Cross House, Martinsburg, West Virginia, NRHP-listed

== See also ==
- Cross Houses
