= Kingsley House =

Kingsley House may refer to:

- Chester Kingsley House, Cambridge, Massachusetts, listed on the National Register of Historic Places (NRHP) in Massachusetts
- Kingsley House (Rehoboth, Massachusetts), listed on the NRHP in Massachusetts
- Edward D. Kingsley House, Portland, Oregon, listed on the NRHP in Oregon
- Kingsley Association, originally named Kingsley House, a settlement house in Pittsburgh, Pennsylvania
