= Grade II listed buildings in Southampton: C =

In total there are 317 listed buildings in the city of Southampton, of which 14 are Grade I, 20 are Grade II* and the remainder Grade II.

In England, a building or structure is defined as "listed" when it is placed on a statutory register of buildings of "special architectural or historic interest" by the Secretary of State for Culture, Media and Sport, a Government department, in accordance with the Planning (Listed Buildings and Conservation Areas) Act 1990. English Heritage, a non-departmental public body, acts as an agency of this department to administer the process and advise the department on relevant issues. There are three grades of listing status. The Grade II designation is the lowest, and is used for "nationally important buildings of special interest". Grade II* is used for "particularly important buildings of more than special interest", while Grade I (defined as being of "exceptional interest" and greater than national importance), is the highest of the three grades.

This list summarises 48 Grade II-listed buildings and structures whose names begin with C. Numbered buildings with no individual name are listed by the name of the street on which they stand.

== Listed buildings ==
Name	Photograph	Date	Location^{[A]}	Description^{[B]}	Link to Historic England database^{[C]}	Link to British Listed Buildings database^{[D]}
Canute Castle Hotel	Canute Castle Hotel	1847–1852	SU4273211028; 50.8971°N 1.3937°W	This corner building stands opposite the main entrance to Ocean Village and is decorated in a "fanciful, classically inspired, style". It was built shortly after the arrival of the railway and the opening of Southampton Docks. The corner five-storey "tower" is surmounted by an octagonal balustraded balcony with urn finials. The Canute Road elevation has a three-storey bay to the left of the tower while the Royal Crescent Road elevation is four storeys with a balustraded parapet at the rear. Above the third floor, there is a cornice bearing the name of the hotel. There are sash windows on each floor, most flanked by Corinthian pilasters, with a moulded balustrade between the ground and first floors. The ground floor has three segmental-headed bar fronts. Above a second floor window, there is a plaque bearing the inscription "Near This Spot A. D. 1028 Canute Reproved His Courtiers". In 2001, the property was converted into eight flats with a retail unit on the ground floor, currently occupied by a firm of estate agents.		
Canute Chambers	Canute Chambers	1893	SU4269810989; 50.8969°N 1.3942°W	These Queen Anne/Dutch Renaissance style former shipping company offices were originally built for the American Line before being occupied by the White Star Line in 1907. Following the sinking of the Titanic in April 1912, the families of the crew members, most of whom came from Southampton, flocked to the company's offices to try to find out news of their relatives. The building is asymmetric; on the right is a large two-bay Dutch gable in five stages with a semi-circular pediment. There are two sash windows on the third floor with four on the first floor; between the ground and first floor is a stone frieze inscribed "Canute Chambers". On the ground floor there is a pair of large arched windows with keystones; this is mirrored on the lower left side where the arched window retains its glazing bars. In the centre of the building is a porch with a scrolled pediment, arcaded overlight and double doors. To the left of the door is a large canted bay window with a modillion cornice. The rear elevation is similar but simpler. Between 1931 and 1969, the offices were occupied by the United States Lines. They were refurbished in 1998 and are still used as offices.		
1 & 2 Canute Road		ca. 1830	SU4266911024; 50.8971°N 1.3946°W	This is a four-storey yellow brick corner building with a moulded parapet and a heavy cornice above the second floor. On the curved corner, there is a first floor triple window with a pediment above. On the third and second floors, there are four sash windows, two on the St. Lawrence Road facade, one on the corner and one on Canute Road, with pilasters from the first tow third floors. The ground floor facade is rusticated with a shop front, two round-headed windows and a round-headed doorcase on Canute Road. The shop premises are currently occupied by a property letting agency.		
3 Canute Road		early 19th century	SU4267711025; 50.8971°N 1.3945°W	This is a four-storeyed stuccoed building with a parapet with a raised centre band and a cornice above the second floor. The cornice bears the inscription "John Good Shipping". On the third and second floors there are three sash windows while on the first floor there is a central window with a pediment and pilasters flanked by a pair of three-light windows with cornices above. There is a doorway between the two late 19th century shopfronts with square pillars and a flat cornice. The offices are occupied by a design company with the shops occupied by a hairdresser and a pizza shop.		
2 Carlton Crescent		ca. 1830	SU4203212782; 50.9130°N 1.4035°W	This is a three-storey stuccoed building with a basement. It has three windows on the second and first floors with two windows and a round-headed doorcase with steps up to the left on the ground floor. There are pilasters at the corners and between the windows, rising from the ground to first floor with a cornice above.		
3 Carlton Crescent	3 to 6 Carlton Crescent	ca. 1830	SU4202912797; 50.9131°N 1.4035°W	This three-storey stuccoed building has a hipped roof concealed by a parapet with a raised central section. It has three windows on the second and first floors and two on the ground floor; the first and ground floor windows have cornices on console brackets, with cast iron balconettes at the first floor. Pilasters run the full height at the corners and between the windows on the first and second floors. There is a plain central doorcase surmounted by a cornice, with steps up.		
4 Carlton Crescent		ca. 1830	SU4202512813; 50.9133°N 1.4036°W	This three-storeyed stuccoed building has a hipped roof with wide eaves. It has three sash windows at both second and first floor levels, with those on the first floor having moulded surrounds and balconettes on the outer pair. There is a moulded cornice above the first floor with pairs of pilasters at each corner; the cornice projects out in the centre over the door supported by four Doric columns.		
5 to 7 Carlton Crescent		ca. 1830	SU4200712847; 50.9136°N 1.4038°W	These three properties are similar being three-storeyed with a cornice with raised central section concealing the hipped roof. There are three sash windows at second and first floor levels with pilasters at the corners and between the windows. The ground floor is rusticated with two windows and a central plain doorcase with steps up. No.5 has restored balconettes at the first floor windows while No. 7 retains its cast iron balcony on the first floor. No. 6 was the birthplace of Emily Davies, the suffragist and co-founder of Girton College.		
8 Carlton Crescent		ca. 1830	SU4198012876; 50.9138°N 1.4042°W	This is a three-storeyed stuccoed building with a hipped roof and a curved bow running the full height of the building on the left hand side. To the right of the bow, there are three sash windows at second and first floor levels with pilasters at the corners and between the windows. The ground floor is rusticated with two windows and a central arched doorcase behind a Doric portico. Formerly known as "Rockstone House", from 1852 until 1865 this was the home of Juan Manuel de Rosas the exiled Argentine dictator. It was later a girls' boarding school, a nursing home and, from 1900, offices of the Ordnance Survey. Now known as "Ambassador House", it is offices to a firm of solicitors.		
9 Carlton Crescent		ca. 1830	SU4193312918; 50.9142°N 1.4049°W	This is a three-storey stuccoed building with a parapet and moulded cornice concealing the roof. It has a projecting central bay and wide full height pilasters at each corner. The central second floor window has a shell moulding above; the remaining windows are plain sash windows. The ground floor is rusticated with a central round-headed doorcase reached by a flight of steps flanked by niches. The offices are currently occupied by a firm of Chartered Surveyors.		
10 Carlton Crescent		ca. 1830	SU4192412922; 50.9142°N 1.4050°W	This three-storey stuccoed property stands on the corner of Rockstone Place. The roof is concealed by a parapet and wide eaves. The Carlton Crescent facade has end pilasters rising to full height with three windows at each level, the central ones of which are blank. The Rockstone Place facade has a full height shallow bow with three lights at each level; to the left are sash windows and an arched doorcase.		
11 Carlton Crescent		ca. 1830	SU4190112932; 50.9143°N 1.4053°W	This is a three-storey stuccoed corner building with its roof concealed by a parapet with a raised central section; the Rockstone place parapet is similar, but with a stack of chimneys rising behind the centre of the parapet. On Carlton Crescent, there are pairs of two-light windows on the second floor; on the first floor, there are two windows with cornices and brackets over, one being a single sash and the other having two lights. On the ground floor, there is a pair of three-light windows. On the Rockstone Place facade, there is a pair of windows on the second floor (one blank) with another pair on the first floor similar to those on the main facade. On the ground floor, there is a blank window to the left with the door up a flight of steps under a bracketed cornice. To the right is a later extension which is "not of special architectural interest". The premises are now part of St. Anne's School.		
12 Carlton Crescent		ca. 1830	SU4188912934; 50.9144°N 1.4055°W	This is also part of St. Anne's School and adjoins No. 11, although it is slightly lower. The roof is concealed behind a parapet with a moulded eaves cornice. There are three sash windows on each floor, those on the ground floor having three lights. There is no door on the street elevation. To the immediate left of this building is the 1961 extension to the school at the junction with Carlton Road for which the architects, Richard Sheppard, Robson & Partners received a Civic Trust design award; this was described as "a model of neighbourly treatment in terms of scale character and materials, and an outstanding example of a modern building meeting present-day requirements yet harmonising beautifully with an earlier style".		
16 Carlton Crescent	16 Carlton Crescent	ca. 1830	SU4184812910; 50.9141°N 1.4061°W	Also known as "Carlton Lodge", this building stands on the corner with Bedford Place. The Bedford Place elevation has a two-storey bay with a small door set back on the right. The main elevation has a central projection the full height of the building with a moulded architrave on the ground floor. Either side of the door are niches between pilasters which support a frieze and cornice. There are three three-light sash windows on the first floor; the outer windows have small cast iron window box guards. The two ground floor windows have arched fan tympana. To the left is a single storey extension with two arched windows, one blank. This building, with its "delicately proportioned stucco features" was described by John Arlott as "arguably the best small house in Southampton". With Wilton Lodge (No. 56 Bedford Place), they were described "as elegant a piece of architecture as one might find anywhere in Hampshire".		
17 to 22 Carlton Crescent		ca. 1830	SU4190112894; 50.9140°N 1.4053°W	Set back from the road behind a line of trees, this is a terrace of six three-storeyed stucco buildings. Each former house has three windows at second and first floor levels with cornice moulding on consoles above the central first floor window. The ground floor is rusticated with a recessed central doorcase up a flight of steps, with rectangular fanlights, except Nos. 21 and 22. These have deeply recessed doors with niches in slightly splayed reveals. The eastern elevation of No. 22 has a parapet with raised central section. At first floor level there are two windows with cornice moulding flanking a central niche with a moulded open pediment. Col. Alexander Clarke, who determined the figure of the Earth, lived in No. 21 between 1861 and 1881. These properties are now occupied as professional offices, including barristers' chambers at Nos. 18 and 19.		
29 Carlton Crescent		ca. 1830	SU4197712830; 50.9134°N 1.4043°W	Also known as "Lampugh House", this is a square, three-storeyed stucco building with the roof concealed by a parapet with a raised central panel. At second and first floor levels there are three window spaces, the central ones being blank. That on the first floor has a bracketed cornice. There are end pilasters to the second and first floors. The ground floor is rusticated with a pair of triple windows. The door is to the right through a double round-headed doorcase. The offices are now occupied by professional firms including accountants and solicitors.		
30 to 32 Carlton Crescent		ca. 1830	SU4199012806; 50.9132°N 1.4041°W	This is a symmetrical group of three properties with the central property (No. 31) being set back behind arcading with a balcony at first floor level. The arcading has arches with radiating voussoirs. The property is four storeys high with a wide cornice between the second and third floors. To the right of No. 30, there is a matching full height wing. Each house has three windows, the centre window on the first floor having cornice moulding supported by consoles. The ground floor windows are arched and recessed with radiating glazing bars. The doors of Nos. 30 and 32 are on the outside of the group, that of No. 31 in the centre. No. 30 has a later Doric porch.		
Avondale House, 33 Carlton Crescent	Avondale House	1833	SU4199812781; 50.9130°N 1.4040°W	This three-storeyed building stands on the apex at the junction of Carlton Crescent and Carlton Place. Much of the original facade has been lost under a later extension which cuts into the portico, with only two of the original four Doric stone columns remaining up a flight of steps on Carlton Place. On Carlton Crescent there is a full height segmental bow with three windows at each floor, some of which are now blank. Originally known as "Clarence House", it was one of the last houses built in Carlton Crescent although it was one of the few not to have a coach house. It was originally built for James Thring, wine merchant, but he soon sold it to Mrs. Eliza Purvis, widow of Admiral John Purvis. It remained in her family until 1918 when it was sold to William Burrough Hill, who used it as auction rooms. It was subsequently used as offices by Brown Bros, a motor car factors who sold it to Braziers, a building company, who renamed it "Avondale House". From 1956, it was the office of Swan National Car Rentals before being renovated, extended and internally adapted in the 1990s when the building was sold to new owners. It now accommodates a bar-restaurant; this was operated by Mitchells & Butlers, who sold it in August 2010 to the Stonegate Pub Company, who operate it under their "Scream" label.		
35 Carlton Crescent		ca. 1830	SU4201212748; 50.9127°N 1.4038°W	This is a three-storeyed stucco building on the corner of Carlton Crescent and Winchester Street. It has three dormer windows with a moulded cornice at the eaves. There are three windows on the second and first floors separated by pilasters with a cast iron balcony with anthemion and heart design on the central first floor. The ground floor is rusticated with two windows and a central round-headed projecting doorcase. The door is up a flight of steps within the porch.		
4 to 7 Carlton Place		early 19th century	SU4198312762; 50.9128°N 1.4042°W	This terrace of four three-storeyed houses has lost many of its original features, with little of interest remaining other than the segmental bow windows to the first floor.		
8 to 10 Carlton Place		early 19th century	SU4196612764; 50.9128°N 1.4044°W	Like its neighbour, this three-storeyed terrace has also lost many of its original features other than one of the shop fronts.		
30 Carlton Place		early to mid 19th century	SU4188212770; 50.9128°N 1.4056°W	This small two-storeyed stuccoed building, which was originally one of a pair that stood either side of the entrance to Bedford Mews, has two round-headed full-height arches with a small window on the first floor in the right-hand arch above the shop front. The door in the left-hand arch has a simple cornice. The property is occupied by a hair salon.		
32 Carlton Place		1847	SU4190812773; 50.9129°N 1.4052°W	This two-storeyed stuccoed building was originally built as an indoor riding school. The front has a roof concealed by a parapet with a central pediment. On the first floor, there are pairs of sash windows at each side of a central trio, the middle of which is arched in the Venetian style. On the ground floor, there are pairs of cambered sash windows with hood moulding and keystones, with a cambered carriage entrance at the centre with a rusticated surround. The building was designed by William Hinves for William Richardson as the "Bedford Riding School" which opened in August 1847. The original school was 120 feet long by 40 feet wide, well lit by side windows with a roof modelled on Westminster Hall. In 1849, it was described as "in every respect the finest building in the kingdom devoted to this purpose". After various uses, on 2 December 1981 the property became the headquarters of the Southampton University Officers Training Corps, by whom it is still occupied.		
Castle Way - pair of K6 telephone kiosks	Castle Way telephone kiosks	1935	SU4193511493; 50.9014°N 1.4050°W	This is a pair of standard K6 style telephone booths designed by Giles Gilbert Scott. They are glazed on all four sides, built of red-painted cast iron and topped with a shallow dome-style roof.		
Central Baptist Church	Central Baptist Church	1910	SU4162212667; 50.9120°N 1.4093°W	Designed by George Baines and Son, the Baptist church is built in a Free Gothic style of red brick in Flemish bond with freestone dressings. It has a tall tower on the north-east comer with stone bands and tall bell-openings, a cornice with gargoyles and a parapet swept up between the corner turrets and octagonal openwork traceried wooden lantern with a short spire.		
Central Bridge	Central Bridge	1881–1882	SU4267011266; 50.8993°N 1.3946°W	Designed by William Jacomb, the chief engineer for the London and South Western Railway Company, this bridge spanned the railway north of the former Southampton Terminus station. Originally providing access to the Woolston Floating Bridge, it now provides a link to the Itchen Bridge. The bridge has three spans, with the widest, central span over the tracks being on riveted iron box-girders supported by riveted iron piers. The smaller, side spans have iron beams with brick jack-arches and riveted iron piers. On the road deck, there are cast-iron balustrades with cast-iron lamp standards. The western approach is over a red brick viaduct over arches, now used as lock-up storage. The bridge was closed to road traffic between February 2010 and March 2011 to enable it to be strengthened.		
Chamberlayne Gas Column	Chamberlayne Gas Column	1822	SU4222011663; 50.9032°N 1.4019°W	The Gas Column is a 50 feet high fluted Doric column cast in iron at Tickell's Foundry in Foundry Lane, Millbrook. It stands on a high square base and is surmounted by a large urn and ball-shaped finial. It was subscribed as a tribute to William Chamberlayne (1760–1829) who was Member of Parliament for Southampton from 1818 until his death. Chamberlayne was also chairman of the company supplying gas lighting to the town and donated the iron columns for the new gas street-lights. In 1822, the column was erected at the junction of New Road and Above Bar Street; it was removed to Town Quay in 1829 and transferred in 1865 to Houndwell. It was re-positioned onto Speakers Corner Roundabout in 1957 during road alterations and again into Houndwell Park in 2000.		
Channels Farmhouse	Channels Farmhouse	16th to 17th century	SU4390416219; 50.9437°N 1.3764°W	Originally part of the Fleming estate at North Stoneham, this farm was occupied by the Channell family from the early 18th century. The building comprises three bays and is timber-framed with brick infill. The front is stuccoed with a thatched roof coming down to the first floor level. There are two very tall chimney stacks each with a cluster of four chimneys. The porch, with its thatched roof tucked under the middle first floor window and supported on four slender Doric columns, was added in the nineteenth century. On the eastern elevation, there is a two-storey bay with exposed timber frame. The farmhouse was derelict in 1963, but an application to demolish it was refused and it became the first Southampton building to receive a grant under the Local Authorities (Historic Buildings) Act of 1962.		
Christ Church, Freemantle	Christ Church, Freemantle	mid 19th century	SU4032112607; 50.9115°N 1.4279°W	Purbeck rubble and ashlar construction, with red brick mouldings around the windows. The building has a nave with a clerestory, chapels to the north and south, and a south porch. The tower, on the west of the building, has a broached spire which was added a decade after the construction of the remainder of the building. The chancel arch is wide, with three bay nave arcades. The windows are of a geometrical style.		
Christ Church, Highfield	Christ Church, Highfield	1846–1847	SU4259914648; 50.9297°N 1.3952°W	The original church was designed by John and Joshua Brandon, but has been much extended since 1847, with the addition of the north aisle in 1855 and the western extension in 1915. Built of coursed rubble, the church has a nave and chancel separated by the south-east tower with buttresses and a broached shingle spire.		
Church of the Ascension	Church of the Ascension	1924	SU4408913949; 50.9233°N 1.3741°W	This church was designed by Sir Charles Nicholson and is built of red brick in English bond with Gothic style stone dressings. At the western end, there is a squat tower in which there is the entrance vestibule with stone stairs into the church, which is built on a slope. Internally, the church has a combined nave and chancel with north and south aisles, separated by six-bay arcades, and chapels at the eastern end. The church has a fine collection of stained glass windows, many by A. K. Nicholson; the west window depicts the "Grace Dieu". In 2008–2009, the church was extended on the Thorold Road side, including the addition of a new main entrance. The church has the only twelve bell tower in Southampton.		
The Cliff Hotel	The Cliff Hotel	mid 19th century	SU4362011124; 50.8980°N 1.3811°W	This is a two-storeyed stucco building under a mansard roof with two dormers behind a moulded cornice with central pediment. The central section has a simple doorcase with three sash windows on the first floor. To the left is a large extension in similar style, while on the right there is a single storey 19th century addition with a hipped roof and pilasters. This extension housed the "Waterfront Club" which was a music venue; the stars who appeared there included The High Numbers in October 1964, shortly before they changed their name to "The Who". The former hotel is now residential apartments.		
Conduit Head	Conduit Head	ca. 1290	SU4124312574; 50.9112°N 1.4147°W	This small rough-stone building, which is scheduled as an ancient monument, covers the spring which originally supplied water to the Franciscan Friary at the lower end of the town. It has three vaulted chambers and an entrance of stone blocks with a carved lintel. It stands in the grounds of the former Nazareth House, and can be accessed from a path leading from the Sandhurst Road allotments. It stood at the edge of the medieval village of Hill. In 1290, Nicholas Barnfleet, Lord of the Manor of Shirley, granted a spring at Hill to the Franciscan Friars.		
Conduit House	Conduit House	early 14th century	SU4158212338; 50.9090°N 1.4099°W	This single-storey stone building in Commercial Road with a stone pitched roof and one blocked slit window, collected water from various wells and springs for the Southampton public water supply. Originally built as part of the system supplying water to the Franciscan Friary, it was transferred to the town council in 1420. Part of one of the earliest known examples of municipally controlled water supply on this scale, it is scheduled as an ancient monument.		
Cowherds Inn	Cowherds Inn	1762	SU4184514005; 50.9240°N 1.4060°W	This inn stands on the edge of Southampton Common on the main Avenue entrance to the city from the north. Built in 1762 on the site of the old cowherd's house, it was renamed the Southampton Arms in 1857 before reverting to the Cowherds 14 years later. The main building has four sash windows on the first floor with two five-light canted bays on the ground floor. The three-bay northern wing is set back with further later extensions. The inn's name is prominently displayed in a large semi-circle above the main entrance. The inn is currently operated as part of the Vintage Inns group.		
Crabwood House	Crabwood House	1840	SU3866714964; 50.9328°N 1.4511°W	Built for a local shipyard owner, Francis Marnett, this house was occupied for many years as part of the Ordnance Survey offices at Maybush. It is a two-storeyed stuccoed house under a slate roof with wide eaves. The main elevation has a central Doric porch with a triglyph frieze and round-headed fanlight. On the first floor, there are three windows, one of which is blank. To the right, there is a later matching wing with four sash windows on the first floor. The original garden (southern) elevation has a pair of canted bay windows with a Victorian wood and glass gabled conservatory at rear. An application was submitted in 2007 to convert the house into six residential units.		
1 to 11 Cranbury Avenue		ca. 1840	SU4243512898; 50.9140°N 1.3977°W	This is a terrace of six houses, each one bay wide. Nos. 5 to 11 are stuccoed, whereas Nos. 1 and 3 are stock brick with rustication at ground floor level. Nos. 5, 7 and 9 have bow windows at ground and second floor, with No. 3 and 11 having bow windows at first floor only. No. 1 has a canted bay window on the first floor, with a cast-iron balcony, with a similar, smaller window on the second floor. Nos. 3 to 11 have balconies at second floor level. The doorways are to the right in round-headed openings with arched fanlights.		
1 to 8 Cranbury Place		ca. 1835	SU4224512891; 50.9139°N 1.4004°W	This is a terrace of eight houses, each three storeys with basement, built of yellow brick under an elaborate double toothed brick cornice, with parapet over. Nos. 1 to 7 have one window on each floor; No. 8 is larger having three windows with a central door and two bay windows. No.4 also has a single bay window. Except nos. 4 and 5, each property has a balconette at the first floor windows, with those at No. 8 having an anthemion motif. All properties, except No.1, have cast iron spear railings at the front. The doorcases have elliptical fanlights; the door for No. 1 is set well back on the right. No. 1 bears a blue plaque stating "John Jellicoe, 1st Earl Jellicoe (1859-1935) Admiral of the Fleet, was born here".		
20 Cranbury Place		early 19th century	SU4233812896; 50.9140°N 1.3991°W	This is a three-storey yellow brick house with basement with rusticated stucco at the ground floor. The roof is concealed by a parapet with stone coping and moulded eaves cornice. At the first floor, there is a French window with shell tympanum over and a cast iron balconette. The property has a simple doorway up a flight of steps with cast iron area railings.		
YMCA Hostel, Cranbury Place		early 19th century	SU4222112930; 50.9143°N 1.4008°W	This building, also known as "George Williams House", fronts onto Dorset Street at the junction with The Avenue, and is occupied by the YMCA. It is a two storeys yellow brick building, with the central section being of higher elevation. The central section has three sash windows at the first floor with two canted bay windows on the ground floor either side of a Tuscan portico. The right-hand section has two sash windows and a small oval window at the first floor and three windows on the ground floor. The left-hand section is larger, with three sash windows on the first floor separated by oval recesses. On the ground floor, there are two pairs of sash windows either side of the large doorcase which has a round headed fanlight. On the Cranbury Place elevation, there are five windows at each floor, with the left-hand ones being blank. At the centre of the ground floor, there is a three light bay window.		
1 Cranbury Terrace		ca. 1835	SU4226712929; 50.9143°N 1.4000°W	This is a three-storeyed house built of yellow brick with a rusticated stucco ground floor. Pilasters run through the first and second floor elevations with three sash windows at each level. On the ground floor there is a plain central door up a flight of steps, with triple-light windows either side.		
4 to 11 Cranbury Terrace		early 19th century	SU4234912937; 50.9144°N 1.3990°W	This is a terrace of eight houses built of yellow stock brick with stuccoed basement areas. Other than No. 11, each house is two-storeyed with three windows and a central door. Nos. 4 and 5 each have plain doors with a large moulded hood. No. 6 projects slightly and forms the central feature of the terrace with four brick pilasters and a door case with a pedimented hood. Nos.7 and 8 are similar to Nos. 4 and 5, although No. 7 retains shutters to the ground floor windows; both have steps up to the door. No. 9 is similar to No. 6 but has a parapet concealing the roof and steps up to the door. No. 10 has pilasters to the door with deep panels and an Egyptian cornice over. No. 11, on the corner of Onslow Road, is three storeyed with a stucco ground floor. The main elevation has stucco corner pediments and a large cornice and parapet with raised centre. It has two windows at the second and first floors with balconies at the first floor windows, and the main entrance door to the left with a window over. To the right is a three-storey flat-roof bay with a single arched window at the first floor and a door on the ground floor. Both doors are reached by winding staircases forming a semi-circle. No. 11 was previously occupied by the Tiberius Casino, but in 2001 this was acquired by the Millennium Third Age Centre.		
The Old Vicarage, Cranford Way		ca. 1870	SU4239714799; 50.9311°N 1.3981°W	The former vicarage to Highfield Church is a large "gothic" yellow brick building under a slate roof with diamond-shaped slates. The front has a three bay wing to the left with a projecting gabled central bay in which there is a three-light bay window on the ground floor. The windows are mainly triple sashes set in cambered headed arches with stone dressings. To the right is a three-storey projecting section with a three-light bay window running the full height. The north-eastern side is three-storeys to the full depth of the building with a large chimney breast decorated with cross-hatching. The south-western side has a rectangular bay window at the first floor supported by brackets. Behind this is a three-storey tower under a pyramidal roof and then a lower section in which there is a porch over the main entrance.		
Cross House	Cross House	mediaeval	SU4311911306; 50.8996°N 1.3882°W	The Cross House was probably built at the site of the boundary cross at "Itchenworth". It was built to provide shelter to passengers waiting to be ferried across the River Itchen. It was mentioned as a weather house in 1577 and its poor state of repair was discussed at the Court Leet in 1596: "(we) thincke it verie requisite the same showld be repaired & maynteined". It was repaired in 1634 and is dated 1634 with the initials of Peter Clungeon, the Mayor at the time. It is built of stone with two walls intersecting at right angles, supporting a conical tiled roof, thus giving shelter from wind in any direction.		
The Crown	The Crown	mid 19th century	SU3989813856; 50.9228°N 1.4337°W	Also known in the past as "The Tramway", this pub stands on the corner of Shirley High Street and Crown Street. It is a two-storey stucco building under a hipped slate roof with five sash windows on the first floor at the front. The corner is diagonal with a further sash window and a single window on the Crown Street elevation. The ground floor has a modern regency style bar front. On Crown Street, there is a single storey porch which has an arched parapet supported by pediments; to the left of this is a later former stable block, now occupied by a florist. The pub, as of December 2014 has been converted for use as a bookmakers.		
5 to 7 Cumberland Place		early 19th century	SU4170012446; 50.9100°N 1.4082°W	This is a terrace of three four-storeyed properties, now occupied as offices, which are stuccoed with rusticated ground floors. They have ornamental stringcourses between the floors and a moulded cornice between the between first and second floors and above the second floor. Each property has a pair of windows at each level including French windows at the first floor under tent-shaped canopies over an iron balcony with heart and honeysuckle motifs. The doors are to the left under Doric porticoes.		
8 and 9 Cumberland Place		mid 19th century	SU4171712447; 50.9100°N 1.4080°W	This is a pair of four-storeyed properties, now occupied as offices. They are built of red brick with stuccoed pilasters and bands between the first and second floors and a broad stuccoed parapet concealing the roof. The ground floor is stuccoed with Doric porticos. Each property has a pair of sash windows at each level. They were listed for their group value with the properties either side.		
10 and 11 Cumberland Place		mid 19th century	SU4172812452; 50.9100°N 1.4078°W	This is a pair of four-storeyed properties, now occupied as offices. The properties are stuccoed with a hipped slate roof. Each property has a pair of sash windows at each level, with French windows on the first floor of No. 11, which has a cast iron balcony over a verandah. No. 10 has a doorcase with an elliptical arch and a three light window on the ground floor.		

=== Notes ===
- ^{A} Location is given first as a grid reference, based on the British national grid reference system (or OSGB36) of the Ordnance Survey; and second as World Geodetic System 84coordinates, used by the Global Positioning System.
- ^{B} Unless otherwise stated, the descriptions are based on those on the Historic England database.
- ^{C} The Historic England database is the official listing and includes a description of the property, the reasons for designation, the date of listing and an extract from the Ordnance Survey map at a scale of 1:2500 pinpointing the exact location of the building.
- ^{D} The British Listed Buildings database also includes the details of the property from the Historic England database, together with links to Google/street view, Ordnance Survey and Bing maps/birds eye view.
