= McGraw House =

McGraw House may refer to:

in the United States (by state)

- McGraw Ranch, Estes Park, Colorado, listed on the NRHP in Larimer County, Colorado
- McGraw House (Bucyrus, Ohio), listed on the NRHP in Crawford County, Ohio
- Donald and Ruth McGraw House, Portland, Oregon, listed on the NRHP in Multnomah County, Oregon
