= Clifton Bacon House =

Historic house in Massachusetts, United States

- U.S. National Register of Historic Places
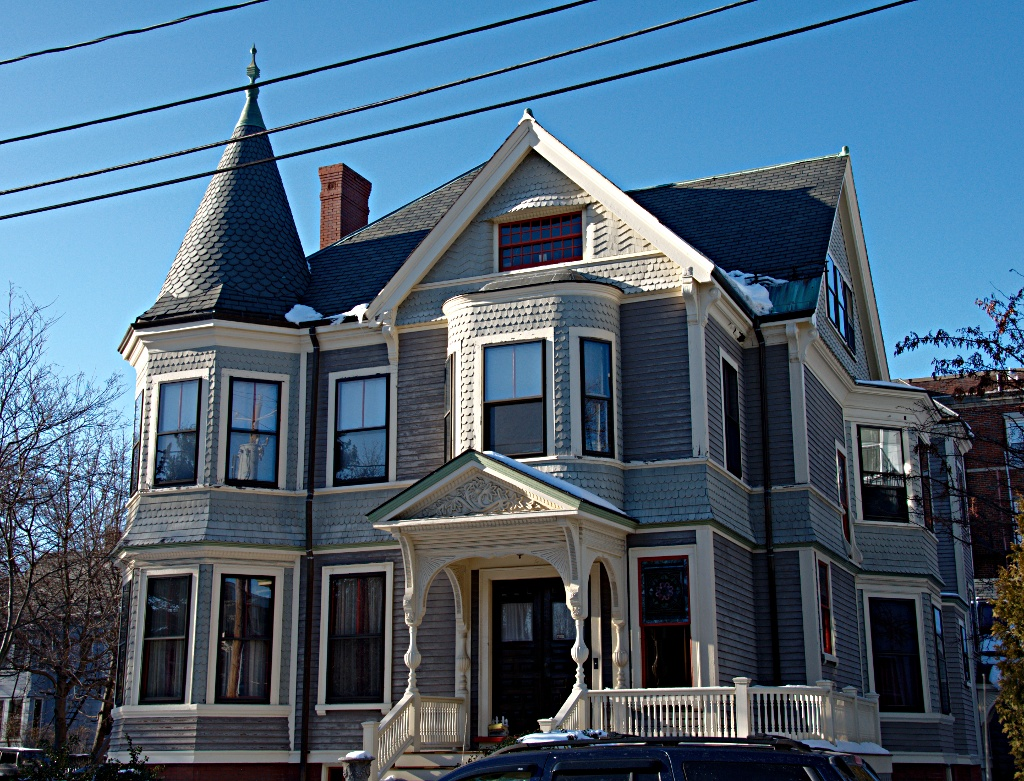

- Location within Massachusetts Location within the United States
- Location: 27 Chester St., Somerville, Massachusetts
- Coordinates: 42°23′39.4885″N 71°7′25.578″W
- Area: less than one acre
- Built: 1887
- Built by: Edmund S. Sparrow
- Architectural style: Queen Anne, Shingle Style
- MPS: Somerville MPS
- NRHP reference No.: 89001244
- Added to NRHP: September 18, 1989

The M. Clinton Bacon House, listed on the National Register of Historic Places as the Clifton Bacon House, is a historic house in Somerville, Massachusetts. Built in 1887, it is one of the city's finest examples of high-style Queen Anne Victorian architecture. It was listed on the National Register of Historic Places in 1989.

== Description and history ==
The house was built in 1887 by M. Clinton Bacon, on land platted for development in 1855 by Chester W. Kingsley, who built his own home down the street. Bacon was married to Kingsley's daughter Ella Jane Kingsley and was a junior partner in the firm of Richardson & Bacon, coal dealers in Cambridge. The builder was Edmund S. Sparrow of Somerville. Sparrow is known to have designed many of the houses he built, and so may have designed this one as well.

The house stands in a residential area south of Davis Square, at the northwest corner of Chester and Orchard Streets. It is a 2 1/2-story wood-frame structure, with a hip roof and mostly clapboarded exterior. It has complex massing, with a large projecting gable section on the right side of the front facade, and a corner polygonal bay on the left that is capped by a steep conical turret. Beneath the right-side gable is a rounded bay on the second floor, below which is an elaborately decorated front porch. The first floor of the house is clad in clapboards, while the upper floors are clad in shingles, including many bands of fish-scale shingles and otherwise decoratively cut shingles. The chimney is topped by decorative brickwork.

The lot was not sold by Kingsley's estate until this house was built, and was one of the last houses built in the neighborhood. It is one of the most high-style Queen Anne Victorians.

== See also ==
- National Register of Historic Places listings in Somerville, Massachusetts
