= Frederick and Grace Greenwood House =

Historic building in Portland, Oregon, U.S.

- U.S. National Register of Historic Places
- Portland Historic Landmark
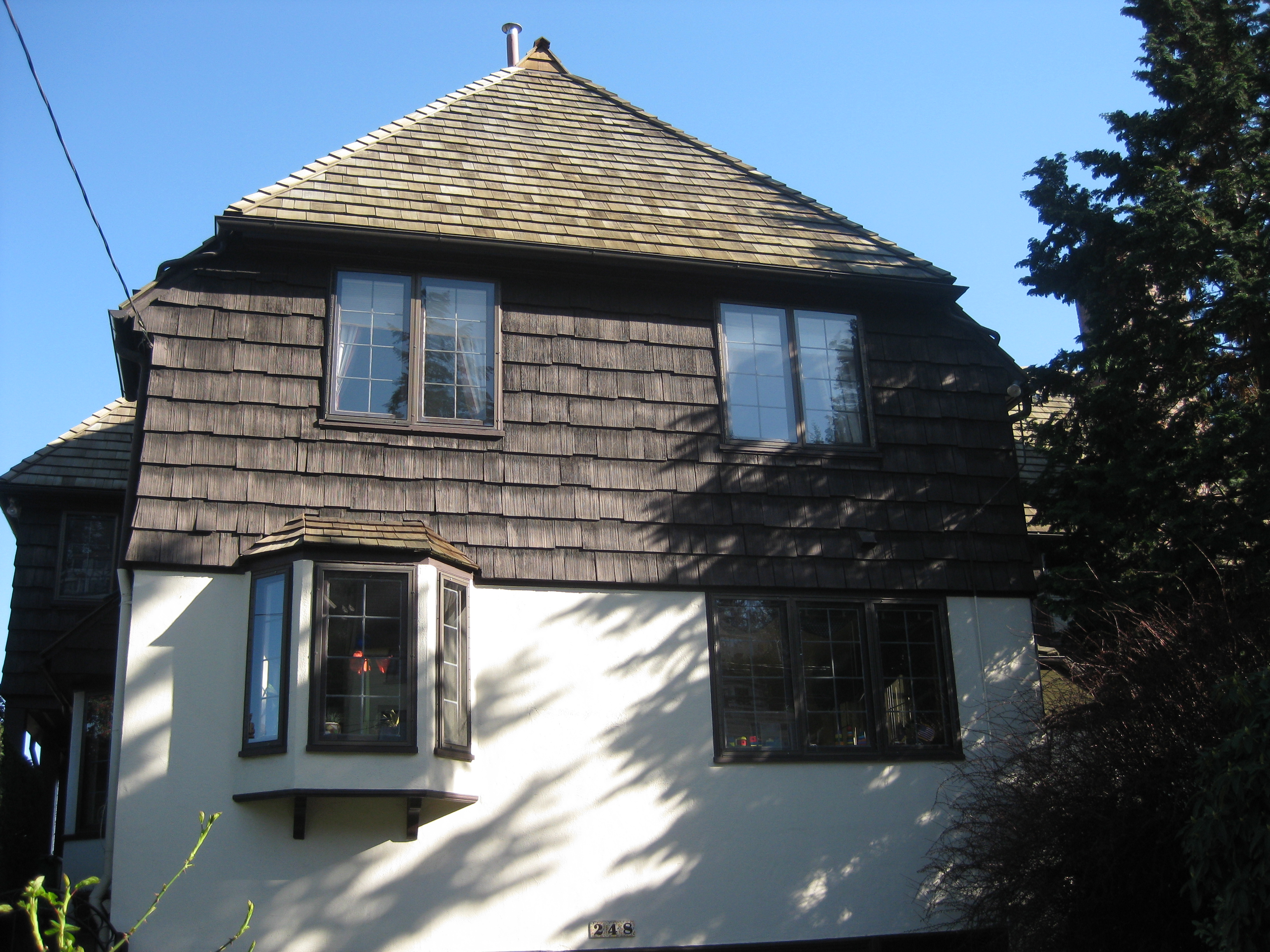

- Location within Portland, Oregon
- Location: 248 SW Kingston Avenue; Portland, Oregon
- Coordinates: 45°31′18″N 122°42′23″W
- Built: 1930
- Architect: Jamieson K. Parker
- Architectural style: Late 19th and 20th Century Revivals, English cottage
- NRHP reference No.: 91000814
- Added to NRHP: June 19, 1991

The Frederick and Grace Greenwood House is a house located in southwest Portland, Oregon, listed on the National Register of Historic Places.

It was designed by architect Jamieson K. Parker.

== See also ==
- National Register of Historic Places listings in Southwest Portland, Oregon
