= Holy Trinity Richmond =

Coordinates: 51°27′46″N 0°17′36″W

- Parish of Holy Trinity and Christ Church, Richmond
- Holy Trinity Richmond
- Location: Holy Trinity Church Centre, Sheen Park, Richmond TW9 1UP
- Country: England
- Denomination: Church of England
- Website: www.htr.church

History
- Founded: 1870

Architecture
- Functional status: Active
- Architect: Raphael Brandon
- Style: plain Gothic

Administration
- Diocese: Southwark

Clergy
- Vicar: Eils Osgood (Interim Incumbent from Mar 2025)

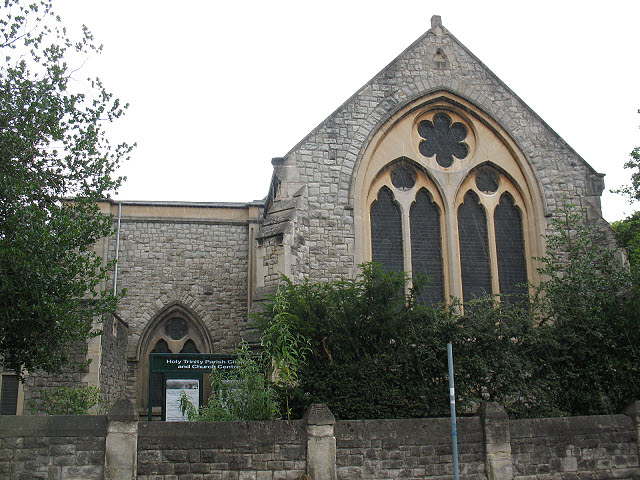

Holy Trinity Richmond is an Anglican parish church in Sheen Park, Richmond, London.

== History ==
The church, an example of Gothic Revival architecture, was built in 1870; the architect was Raphael Brandon. A tower by Charles Lock Luck (1833/34–90), dating from 1880, was removed in about 1970 for safety reasons.

A 1950s-vintage meeting room complex north west of the church was replaced in 1992.

== Services and activities ==
Full details of current Services, events, groups and activities can be found on the church's website at www.htr.church.
