= Carl E. Nelson House =

Historic house in Oregon, United States

- U.S. National Register of Historic Places
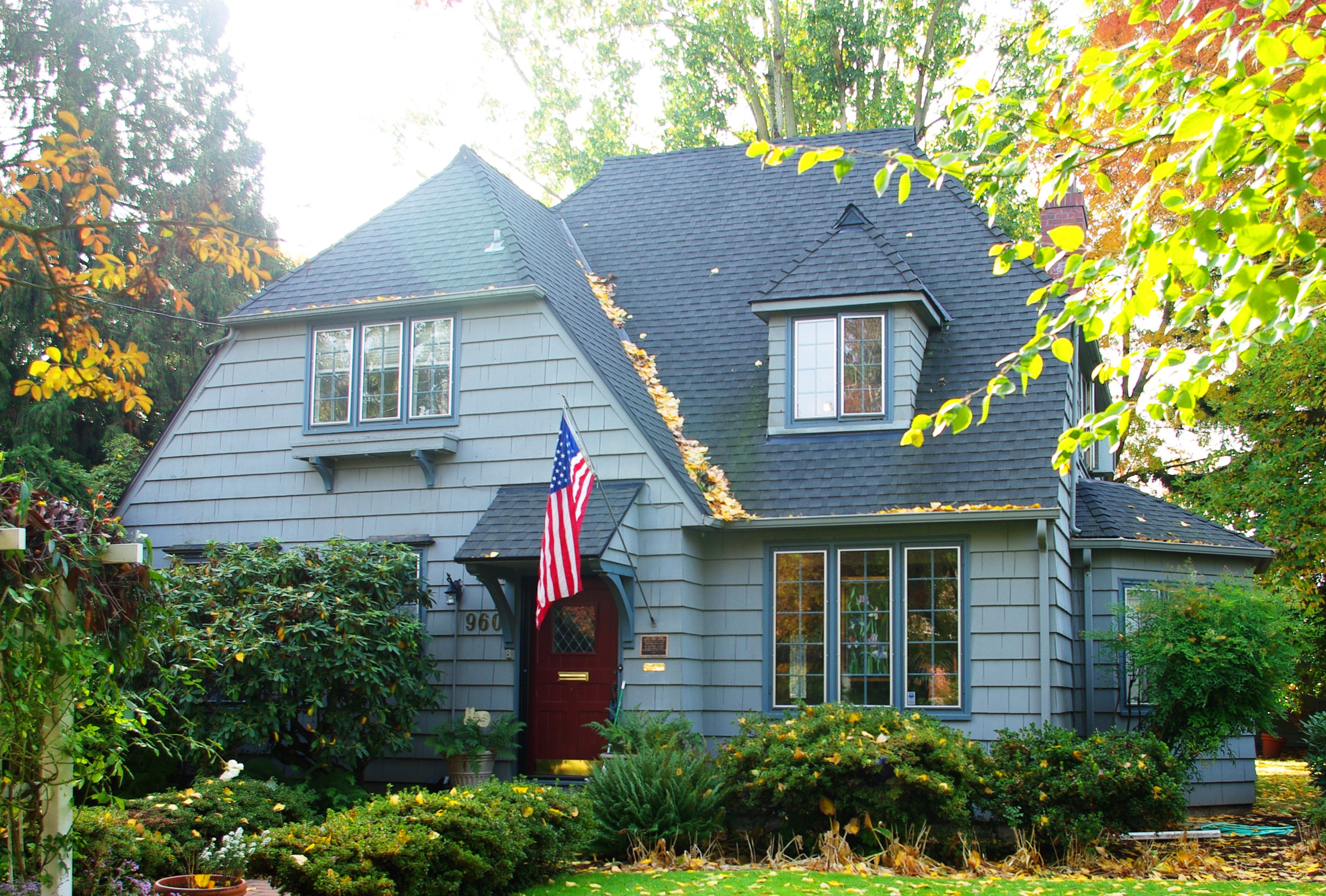
- The Nelson House in 2009

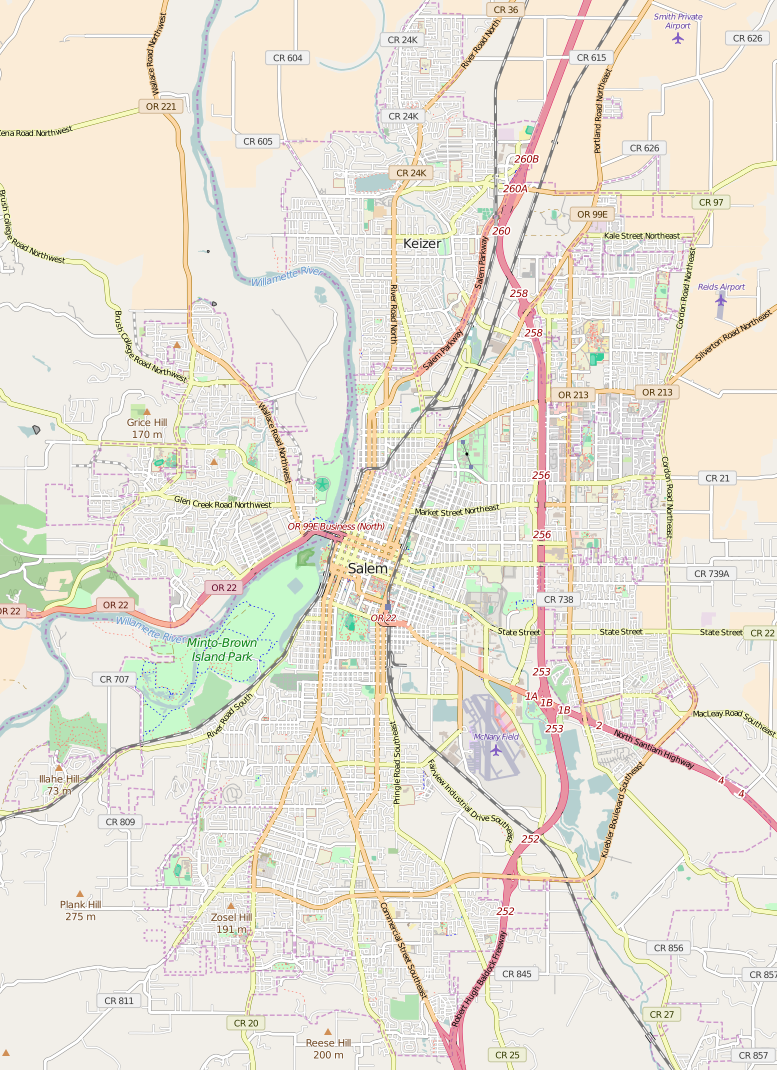
- Location within Salem OR Location within Oregon
- Location: 960 E Street NE; Salem, Oregon
- Coordinates: 44°56′50″N 123°01′30″W
- Area: 0.20 acres (0.081 ha)
- Built: 1924
- Architect: Jamieson Parker
- Architectural style: English Cottage
- NRHP reference No.: 97000587
- Added to NRHP: June 13, 1997

The Carl E. Nelson House is a historic residence in Salem, Oregon, which was built in 1924.

It was designed by Jamieson Parker. It is a one-and-a-half-story house with main ground plan 34 by 32 feet (10.4 m × 9.8 m).

The house was listed on the National Register of Historic Places in 1997.

== See also ==
- National Register of Historic Places listings in Marion County, Oregon
