= Clarence L. Smith =

American architect

Clarence L. Smith (1894–1951) was an American architect.

According to a drafted nomination for a proposed Fairmount Historic District in Salem, Oregon, he was a "locally prominent and prolific architect" of Salem.

Smith was born in Portland, Oregon. In Portland, he apprenticed under Charles Ertz and then under O. L. DuPuy, and then under others in Ithaca, New York, New York City, and Portland again. He completed two years of study in architecture at Cornell University in Ithaca.

A number of his works are listed on the National Register of Historic Places.

== Works ==
- Curtis Cross House (1924), 1635 Fairmount Ave., S. Salem, Oregon (original design by Clarence L. Smith, completed by architect Jamieson Parker), NRHP-listed
- Gaiety Hollow, the home of Elizabeth Lord and Edith Schryver of the landscape architecture firm Lord & Schryver
- Marion County Housing Committee Demonstration House, 140 Wilson St., S Salem, OR (Smith, Clarence L.), NRHP-listed
- Edgar T. Pierce House, 1610 Fir St., S Salem, OR (Smith, Clarence L.), NRHP-listed
- Dr. and Mrs. Charles G. Robertson House and Garden, 460 S. Leffelle St. Salem, OR (Smith, Clarence L.), NRHP-listed
- One or more works in Gaiety Hill-Bush's Pasture Park Historic District, roughly bounded by Pringle Creek, Mission St., Bush's Pasture Pk., Cross, High, and Liberty Sts. Salem, OR (Smith, Clarence L.; et al.), NRHP-listed
