= Jamieson Parker =

- Born: January 28, 1895; Portland, Oregon, U.S.
- Died: December 8, 1939 (aged 44); Portland, Oregon
- Education: University of Pennsylvania
- Occupations: Architect, government administrator

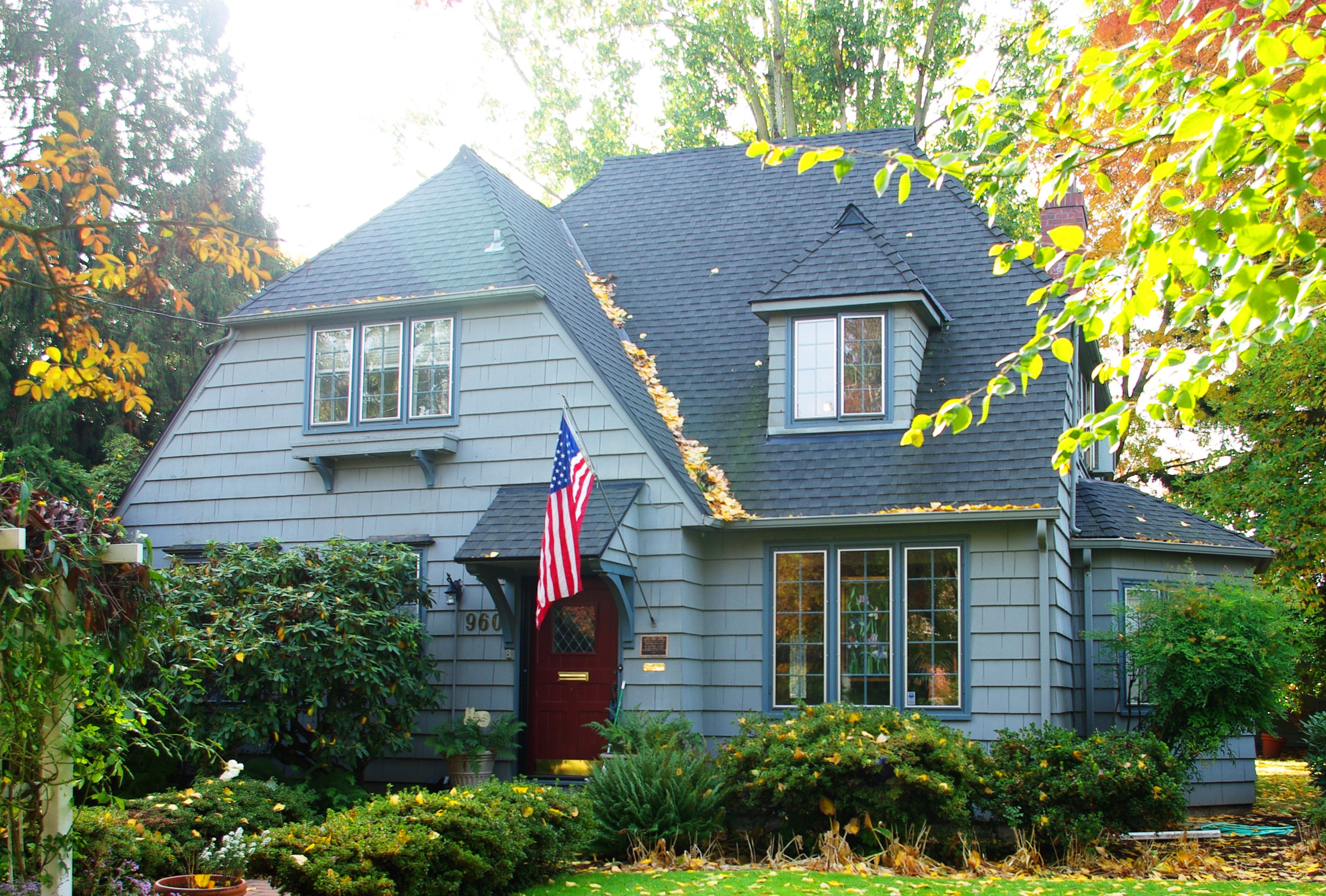
Carl E. Nelson House

Jamieson Kirkwood Parker (January 28, 1895 – December 8, 1939) was an American government administrator and architect from Oregon, working primarily in Portland and Salem. He worked as an architect for the better part of two decades, before changing to federal and state government work, culminating in his serving as director of the Oregon division of the Federal Housing Administration from mid-1935 until his death in late 1939.

== Early life and education ==
Jamieson Parker was born in Portland, Oregon, on January 28, 1895. He graduated from the University of Pennsylvania in 1916, and began working as an architect in Portland shortly thereafter. During World War I, he served as a second lieutenant of the Coast Artillery.

== Career ==
Except during his period of wartime military service, Parker worked as an architect from 1916 until 1934, and at one time was president of the Oregon chapter of the American Institute of Architects.

In January 1934, he was appointed district officer for the survey of historic buildings in Oregon and Washington, on the recommendation of the U.S. Interior Department. He subsequently became assistant to the director of the Federal Housing Administration's Oregon division and, in December 1934, the division's associate director. He was named FHA director for Oregon in June 1935 and served in that post until his death in 1939.

== Works ==
Works include:

=== Salem ===
- Curtis Cross House (1924), 1635 Fairmount Ave S, designed by architect Clarence L. Smith and completed by Jamieson Parker, listed on the National Register of Historic Places
- Carl E. Nelson House (1924), 960 E St NE, NRHP-listed

=== Portland ===
- Parish of St. Mark, 1025 NW 21st Ave
- First Unitarian Church of Portland, 1011 SW 12th Ave, NRHP-listed
- Caroline W. and M. Louise Flanders House, 2421 SW Arden Rd, NRHP-listed
- Frederick and Grace Greenwood House, 248 SW Kingston Ave, NRHP-listed
- William A. Haseltine House, 3231 NE U.S. Grant Place, NRHP-listed
- Edward D. Kingsley House, 2132 SW Montgomery Drive, NRHP-listed
- Donald and Ruth McGraw House, 01845 SW Military Rd, NRHP-listed

== Death ==
Parker died at St. Vincent's Hospital, on December 8, 1939, after an illness lasting one month.
