= Caroline W. and M. Louise Flanders House =

Historic building in Portland, Oregon, U.S.

- U.S. National Register of Historic Places
- Portland Historic Landmark
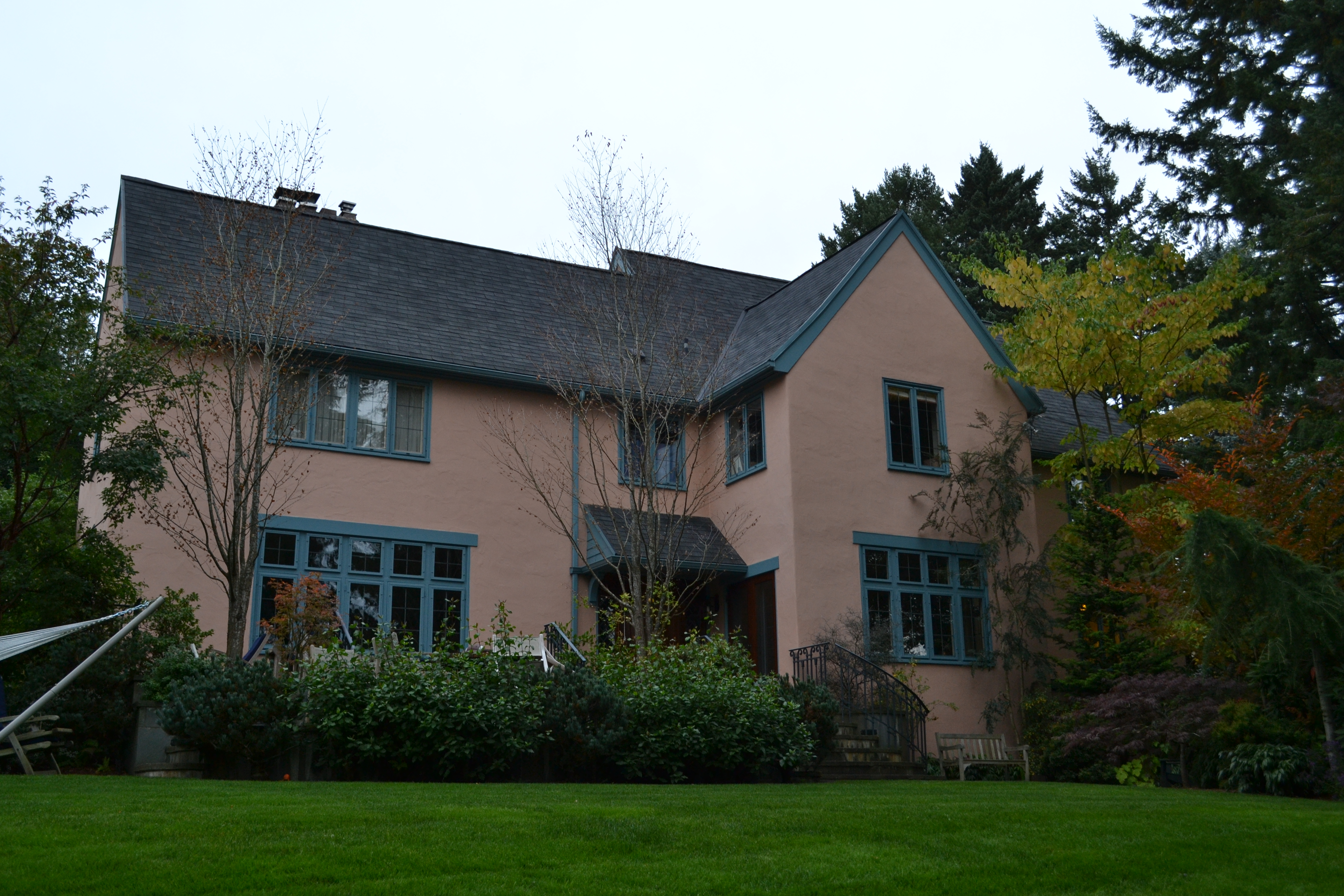
- The Flanders House in 2011.

- Location within Portland, Oregon
- Location: 2421 SW Arden Road; Portland, Oregon
- Coordinates: 45°30′17″N 122°42′10″W
- Area: 0.5 acres (0.20 ha)
- Built: 1926
- Architect: Jamieson K. Parker
- Architectural style: English Cottage
- NRHP reference No.: 91000127
- Added to NRHP: March 1, 1991

The Caroline W. and M. Louise Flanders House is a house located in southwest Portland, Oregon, listed on the National Register of Historic Places.

== See also ==
- National Register of Historic Places listings in Southwest Portland, Oregon
