= Marion County Housing Committee Demonstration House =

Historic house in Oregon, United States

- U.S. National Register of Historic Places
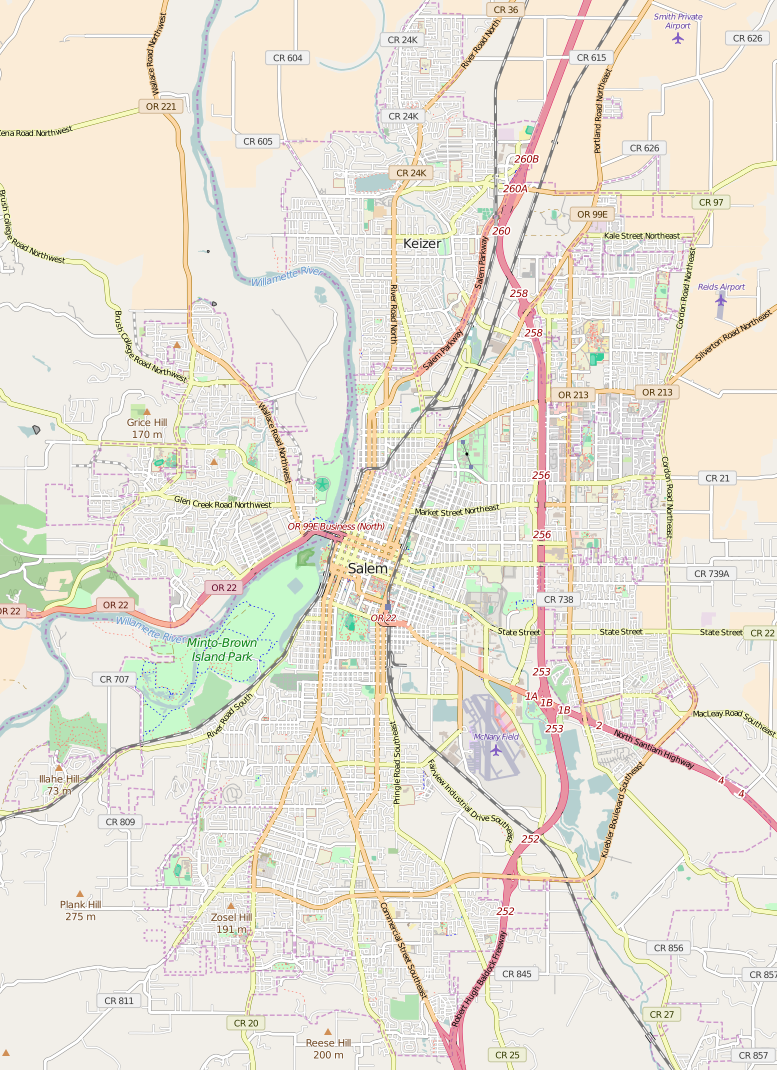
- Location within Salem OR Location within Oregon
- Location: 140 Wilson St., S, Salem, Oregon
- Coordinates: 44°55′42″N 123°2′36″W
- Area: less than one acre
- Built: 1935
- Architect: Clarence L. Smith, Frank S. Strubble
- Architectural style: Colonial Revival, Cape Cod
- NRHP reference No.: 88001243
- Added to NRHP: August 11, 1988

The Marion County Housing Committee Demonstration House in Salem, Oregon is a small house from c. 1860 that was renovated extensively in 1934–35. It has also been known as the William Beckett House, named for the person believed to be the original owner in the 1860s. It was listed on the National Register of Historic Places in 1988. It is a work of architects Clarence L. Smith and Frank S. Strubble.
