= William A. Haseltine House =

Historic building in Portland, Oregon, U.S.

- U.S. National Register of Historic Places
- Portland Historic Landmark
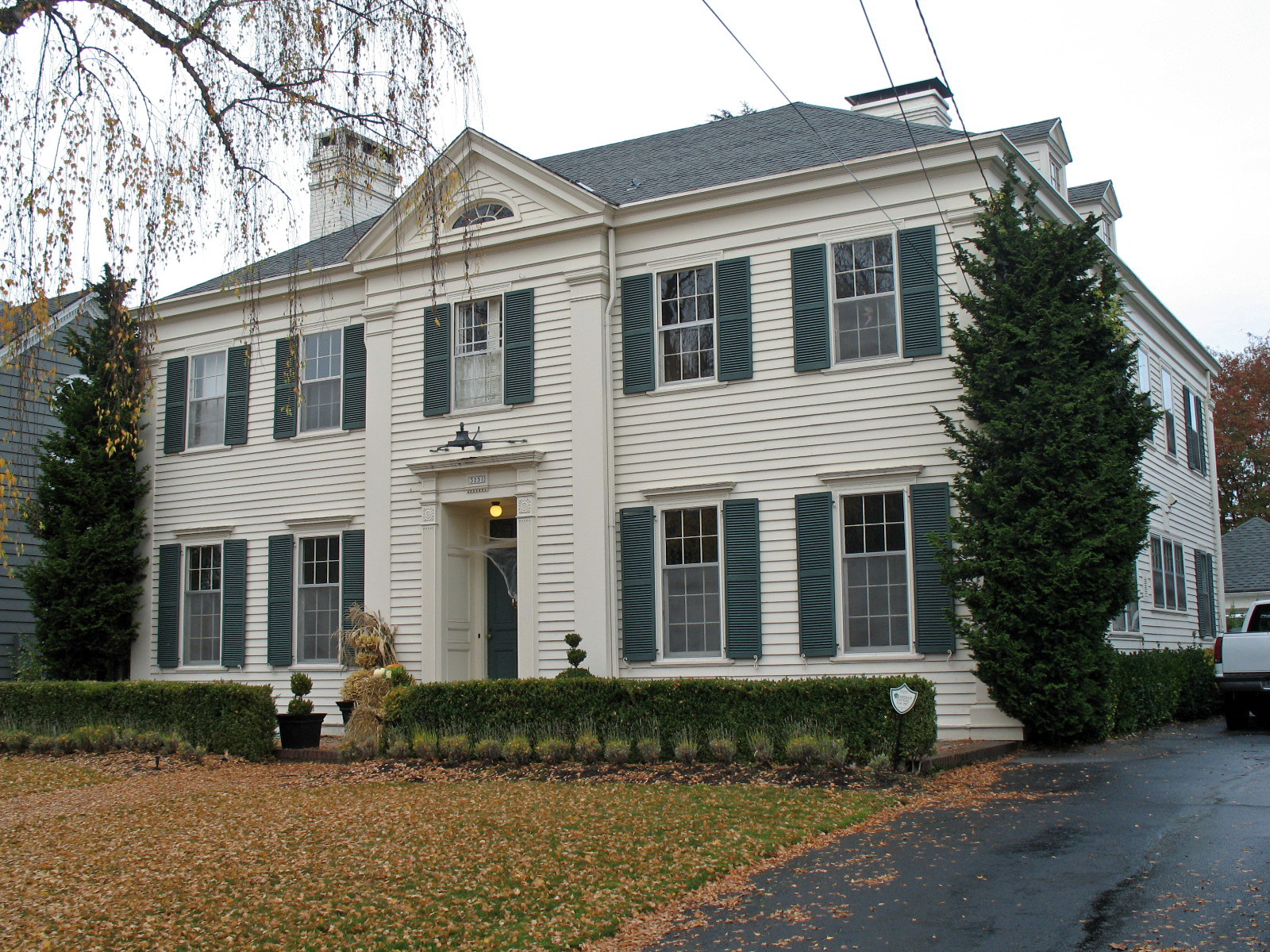

- Location within Portland, Oregon
- Location: 3231 NE U.S. Grant Place; Portland, Oregon
- Coordinates: 45°32′17″N 122°37′56″W
- Area: 0.3 acres (0.12 ha)
- Built: 1935
- Architect: Jamieson Parker
- Architectural style: Colonial Revival, Georgian Revival
- NRHP reference No.: 91001551
- Added to NRHP: October 17, 1991

The William A. Haseltine House is a house located in northeast Portland, Oregon listed on the National Register of Historic Places.

It was designed by architect Jamieson Parker.

== See also ==
- National Register of Historic Places listings in Northeast Portland, Oregon
