= Joshua Arthur Rodrigues Brandon =

English architect and author

Joshua Arthur Rodrigues Brandon (9 February 1822, London – 11 December 1847, 11 Beaufort Buildings, Strand) was an English architect and author. Prior to an early death aged twenty-five, his architectural practice (particularly in church architecture) was promising and growing.

== Buildings ==
With his brother Raphael he designed the new corn exchange at Colchester, Essex (1845); Portswood Chapel (1847) and Christ Church, Southampton (1847) (where he is buried in the churchyard); All Saints' Church, Sculthorpe, Norfolk (1847) and Holy Trinity Church, Leverstock Green, Hertfordshire, for which he accepted the commission in 1846, dying before its completion in 1849.

== Publications ==
With his brother he researched three seminal works on Early English architecture:

- Analysis of Gothic Architecture (1847) - more than 700 examples of windows, doors, windows, and other architectural details, with measurements observed at first hand, collected from parish churches
- Parish Churches (1848) - 63 churches from across England, each with perspective views, a short description in text and a plan (to the same scale for all the churches)
- Open Timber Roofs of the Middle Ages (1849) - perspective, geometric and detail drawings of 35 timber roofs from parish churches in 11 different English counties, showing their form and principle of each example, with an introduction on the topic in general. The Builder commented that the work:

"serves the one useful and necessary purpose of showing practically and constructively what the builders of the middle ages really did with the materials they had at hand, and how all those materials, whatever they were, were made to harmonise."

== Sources ==
- Dictionary of National Biography
