= Highfield Church =

- Christ Church, Portswood
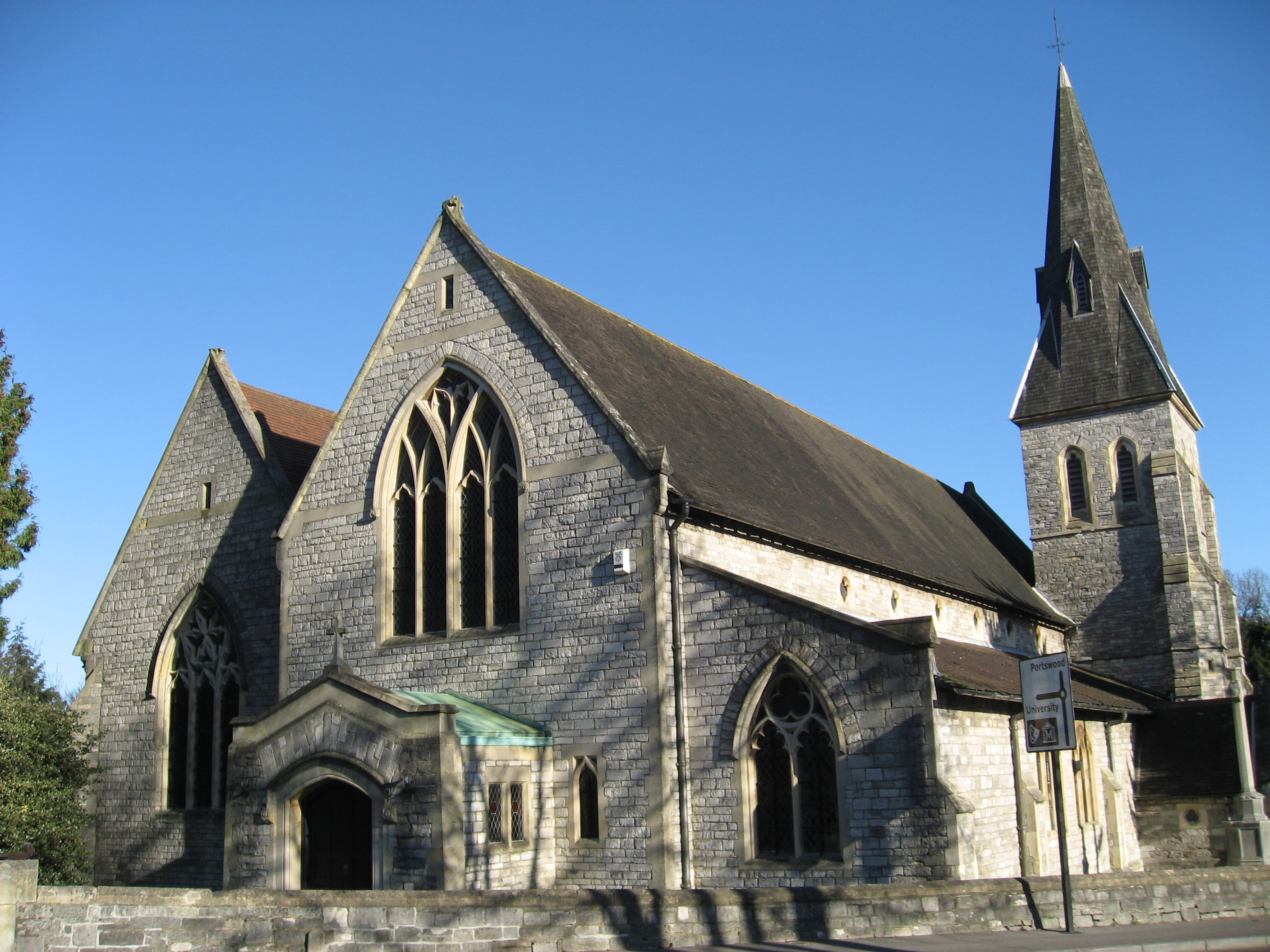
- Highfield Church in 2007

- Shown within Southampton
- 50°55′47″N 1°23′43″W
- OS grid reference: SU 42599 14648
- Location: Highfield, Southampton
- Country: England
- Denomination: Church of England
- Website: www.highfield.church

History
- Status: Church
- Founded: 12 September 1846
- Founder: Charles Sumner
- Dedication: Christ
- Consecrated: 17 September 1847

Architecture
- Functional status: Active
- Heritage designation: Grade II listed
- Designated: by 1969
- Architect: Joshua Brandon

Specifications
- Materials: Purbeck Stone, Caen Stone mouldings

Administration
- Diocese: Winchester
- Parish: Highfield

Clergy
- Vicar: Mike Archer

Highfield Church is a parish church in the Highfield district of Southampton, England. It is an Anglican Church in the Diocese of Winchester.

== History ==
=== Early history ===
The foundation stone for Highfield Church was laid on 12 September 1846 and it was consecrated on 17 September 1847, by the Right Reverend Charles Sumner, the Bishop of Winchester. The first Minister was the Reverend Philip Raulin Robin. The legal name of the church is Christ Church, Portswood but it became commonly known as Highfield Church in 1883.

=== World Wars ===
During the First World War (1914–1918) quite a number of the men from the parish went to the battlefields. Within the parish boundaries about 100 acres (0.40 km^{2}) of land were being developed for housing so a western extension was built to accommodate the extra congregation. A First World War memorial was erected near the south door in 1921.

During the Second World War (1939–1945) Southampton was bombed heavily and there were direct hits on the parish and much loss of life. Throughout this period the clergy and members of the church kept watch on the church with a stirrup pump, buckets and shovels. The windows were given a coating of a rubber solution to lessen the danger of splintering glass.

The neighbouring church of St Barnabas was destroyed in 1940 and the two churches were temporarily merged until the rebuilding of the church at St Barnabas in 1957.

In 1941 there was an air raid where incendiary bombs fell near to the church. There was no serious structural damage to the church but windows in both the east and west ends of the church were shattered and the caretaker's quarters were destroyed. Despite the roof requiring 7000 new tiles, the morning matins went ahead. The church replaced those eastern windows that were destroyed in the Blitz and these were the church's memorial to those who died in the Second World War.

=== Later history ===
The church celebrated its centenary in September 1947 with services by two previous vicars.

Windows on the East side of the church building destroyed during World War Two were replaced in 1952.

The church building was listed Grade II on the National Heritage List for England in October 1981.

== Architecture ==
The church originally had a nave, a small chancel with clerestory windows, a south aisle, and a tower with a broached oak shingled spire, which contained one bell. The architect was Joshua Brandon, who died before the building was completed and is buried in the churchyard. The walls of the church are of Purbeck Stone with mouldings of Caen Stone and the painted glass windows were created by Nixon and Ward.

The church has been built onto and altered many times since it was first built.

- In 1852 a parsonage was added and used as a vicarage,
- In 1855 the north aisle was added,
- In 1863 gas lighting was installed (candles had been used in the church before this time),
- In 1869 the chancel was rebuilt, the spire restored, and the windows raised,
- In 1885 gas regulators and burners were installed throughout the church,
- In 1915 the western extension was built,
- In 1921 a First World War memorial was erected near the south door,
- In 1955 a west porch was designed by Ernest Berry Webber (who was the architect of the Civic centre of Southampton) and dedicated to Sir Sidney Kimber and his son.
- In 2011, the pews were replaced with soft seating and the building renovated and updated

== Area ==
Highfield Church is at the junction of Highfield Lane and Church Lane in the Highfield area of Southampton. Next to the church is the Church Centre, which is used by the church and the community for events, for example, adult education classes. Adjacent to the church is the main Highfield campus of the University of Southampton. The Highfield Church of England School building stands next to Highfield Church.
