= Franciscan Friary, Southampton =

Friary in Southampton, England

Coordinates: 50°54′25.51″N 1°24′1.57″W

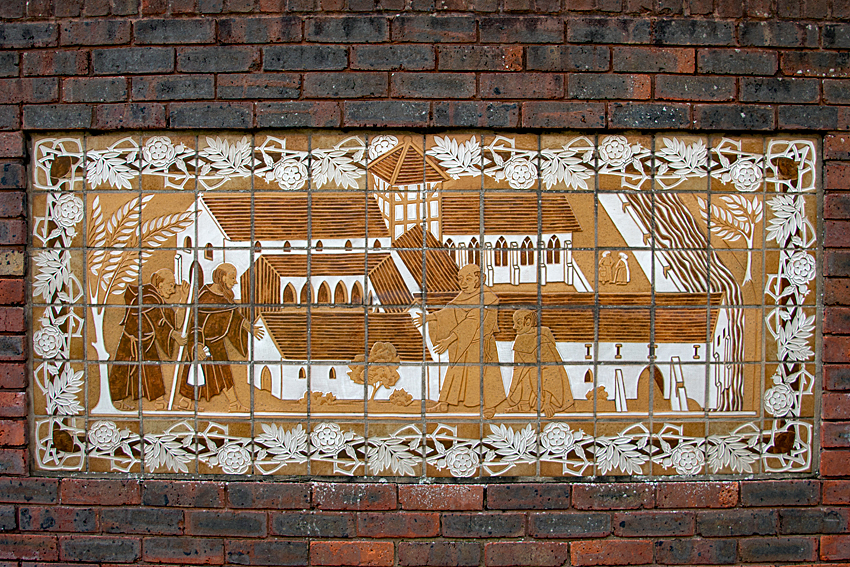
Depiction of Southampton Friary

The Franciscan Friary of Southampton was founded c. 1233. It occupied a south-eastern area of the city, within the walls and adjacent to God's House Tower. The friary was notable for its water supply system, which supplied water for use by the friars themselves and by the other inhabitants of Southampton. The friary was dissolved in 1538 and the last remains were swept away in the 1940s. The site is now occupied by Friary House. Elsewhere, remnants of the extensive water supply system still survive today.

== The water supply system ==
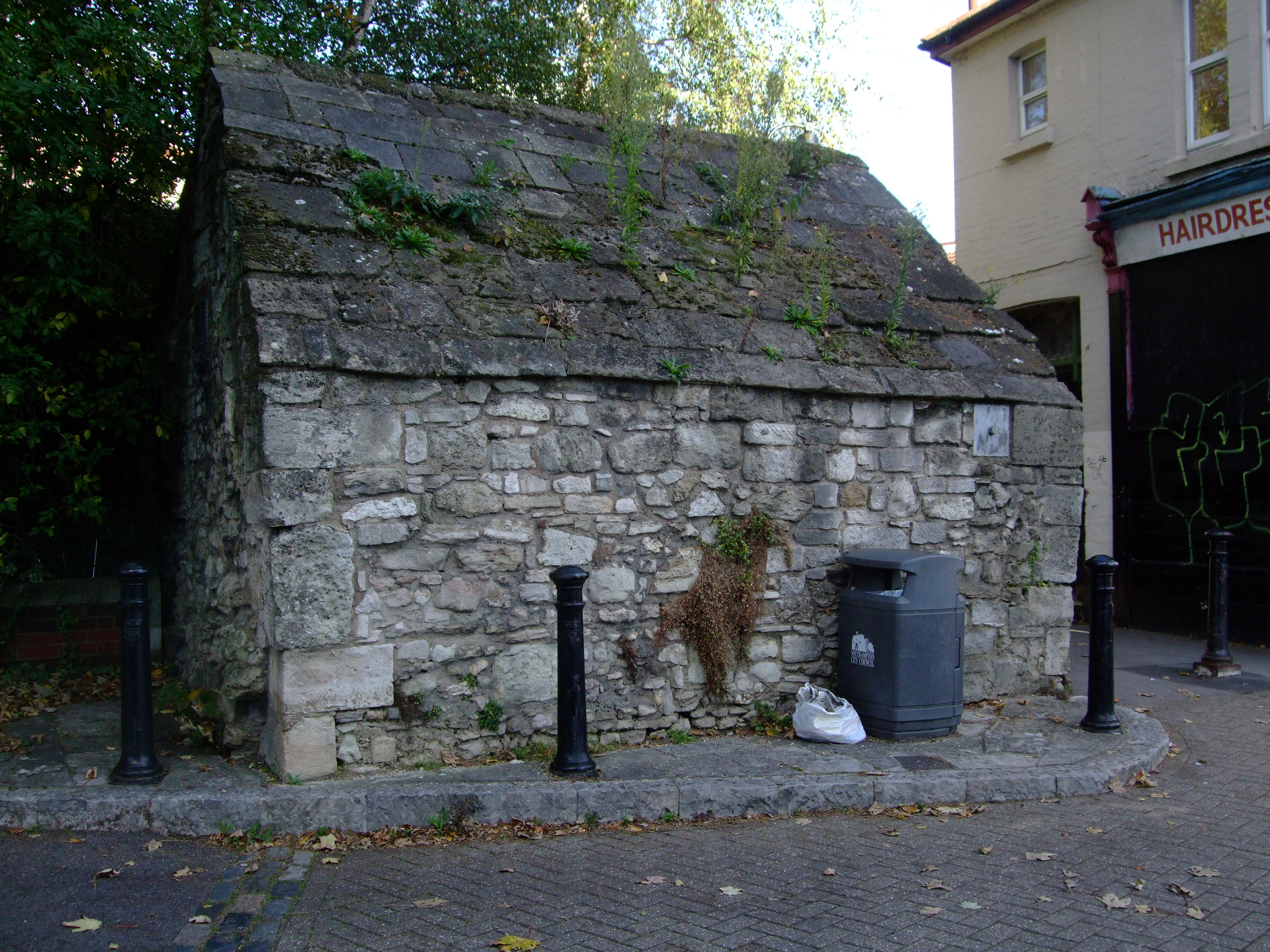
Conduit House, a remnant of the medieval water supply system devised by the friars.

The water supply system was originally devised by the friars for their own use. In 1290, Nicholas de Barbeflet granted them access to the springs on his manor of Shirley, Southampton, out to the north west of the medieval town. The friars constructed a system of water pipes to bring the water to their friary in 1304. In all, the water had to travel some 1.7 kilometres from the spring to the friary within the town walls. There were several other springs supplying water to the friary; these were located around The Polygon, Southampton, but no traces remain above ground.

In 1310, the friars granted use of their water supply to the people of Southampton. In 1420, the friars were struggling to maintain the water supply system in good order, and therefore passed on ownership of the supply system to the mayor and community of Southampton. The water supply system remained in their hands for the rest of its lifetime. It was eventually superseded by the boring of new wells for use by the townspeople.

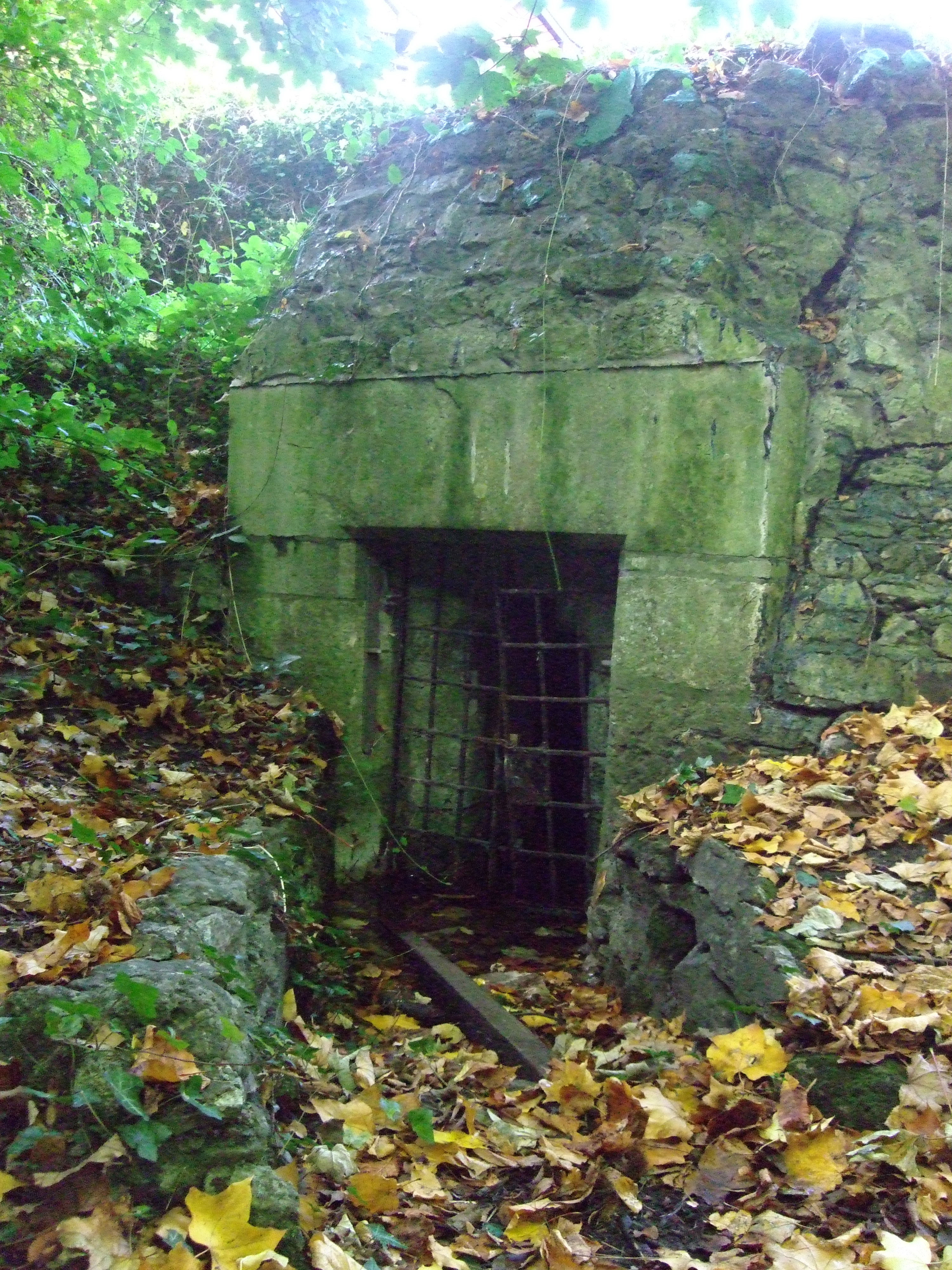
Conduit Head was used to channel one of the water sources acquired by the friars.

=== Visible remains ===
Although long since disused, remnants of the water supply system can be seen today, albeit outside of the town walls. At the site of the former manor in Shirley, the original water source is marked by Conduit Head, a stone building comprising a small locked gateway and several underground chambers which channeled fresh water rising from the springs. Though in disrepair and hidden away behind new housing developments, the site can still be accessed from a path leading from the Sandhurst Road allotments.

Elsewhere, more visible remnants can be seen at Conduit House on Commercial Road. The purpose of this stone building remains uncertain.
