= Cross House (Beebe, Arkansas) =

Historic house in Arkansas, United States

- Formerly listed on the U.S. National Register of Historic Places
- Location within Arkansas Location within the United States
- Location: 410 S. Main St., Beebe, Arkansas
- Coordinates: 35°3′58″N 91°52′31″W
- Area: less than one acre
- Built: 1900
- Architectural style: Vernacular ell-shaped
- MPS: White County MPS
- NRHP reference No.: 91001259

Significant dates
- Added to NRHP: July 10, 1992
- Removed from NRHP: January 26, 2018

The Cross House was a historic house at 410 South Main Street in Beebe, Arkansas. It was a 1 1/2-story L-shaped wood-frame structure, with a cross-gable roof and novelty siding. The front-facing gable had a pair of sash windows with pedimented gables. A porch, with a shed roof supported by Doric columns, stood at the crook of the L. The house was built about 1900, and was one White County's few surviving L-shaped houses from that period.

The house was listed on the National Register of Historic Places in 1992. It has been listed as destroyed in the Arkansas Historic Preservation Program database, and was delisted in 2018.

== See also ==
- National Register of Historic Places listings in White County, Arkansas
