= Curtis Cross House =

Historic house in Oregon, United States

- U.S. National Register of Historic Places
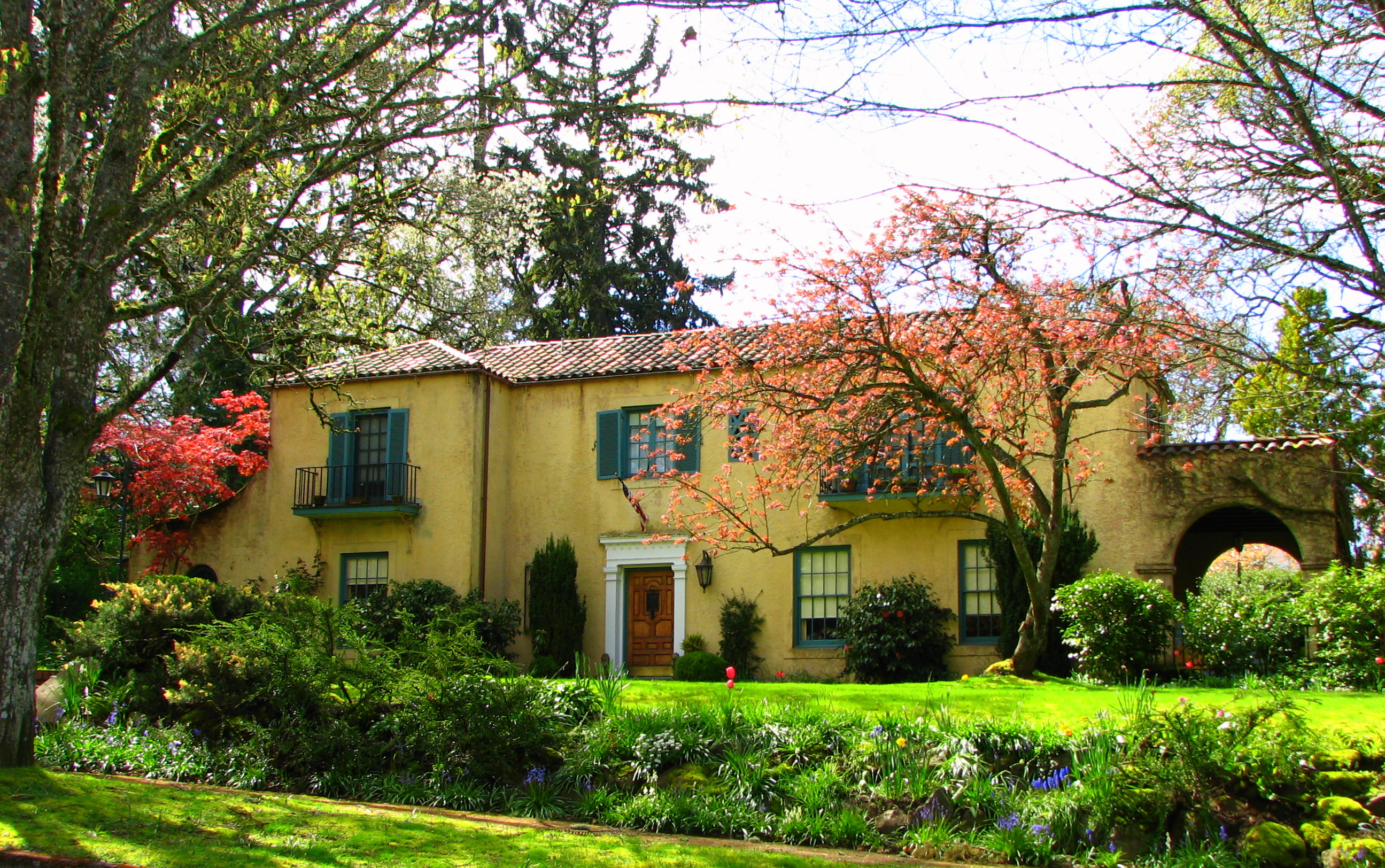

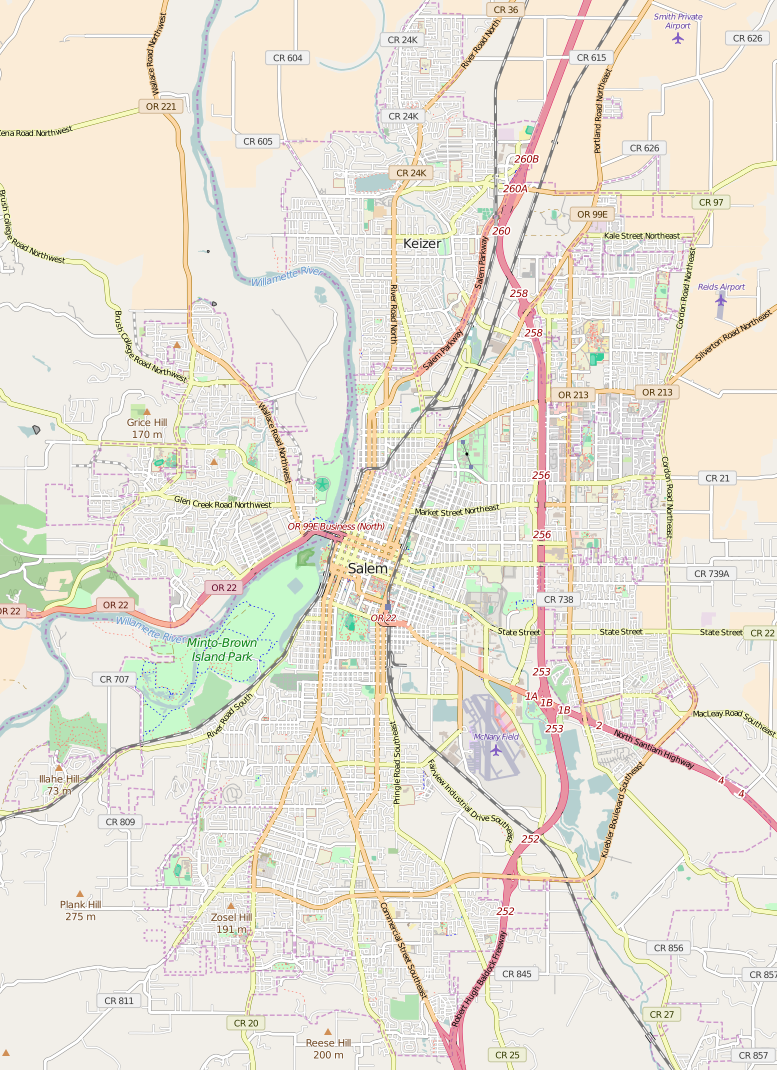
- Location within Salem OR Location within Oregon
- Location: 1635 Fairmount Ave S, Salem, Oregon
- Coordinates: 44°55′31″N 123°2′52″W
- Area: less than one acre
- Built: 1924
- Architect: Clarence L. Smith; Jamieson Parker
- Architectural style: Late 19th and 20th Century Revivals, Mediterranean
- NRHP reference No.: 81000506
- Added to NRHP: December 18, 1981

The Curtis Cross House is a historic residence in Salem, Oregon, United States. It was designed by architect Clarence L. Smith, and was listed on the National Register of Historic Places in 1981.

The house was one of Smith's first works in Salem and the client, Curtis Cross, apparently was not happy. Cross brought the project to Portland, Oregon architect Jamieson Parker to complete it.
