= Donald and Ruth McGraw House =

Historic house in Oregon, United States

- U.S. National Register of Historic Places
- Portland Historic Landmark
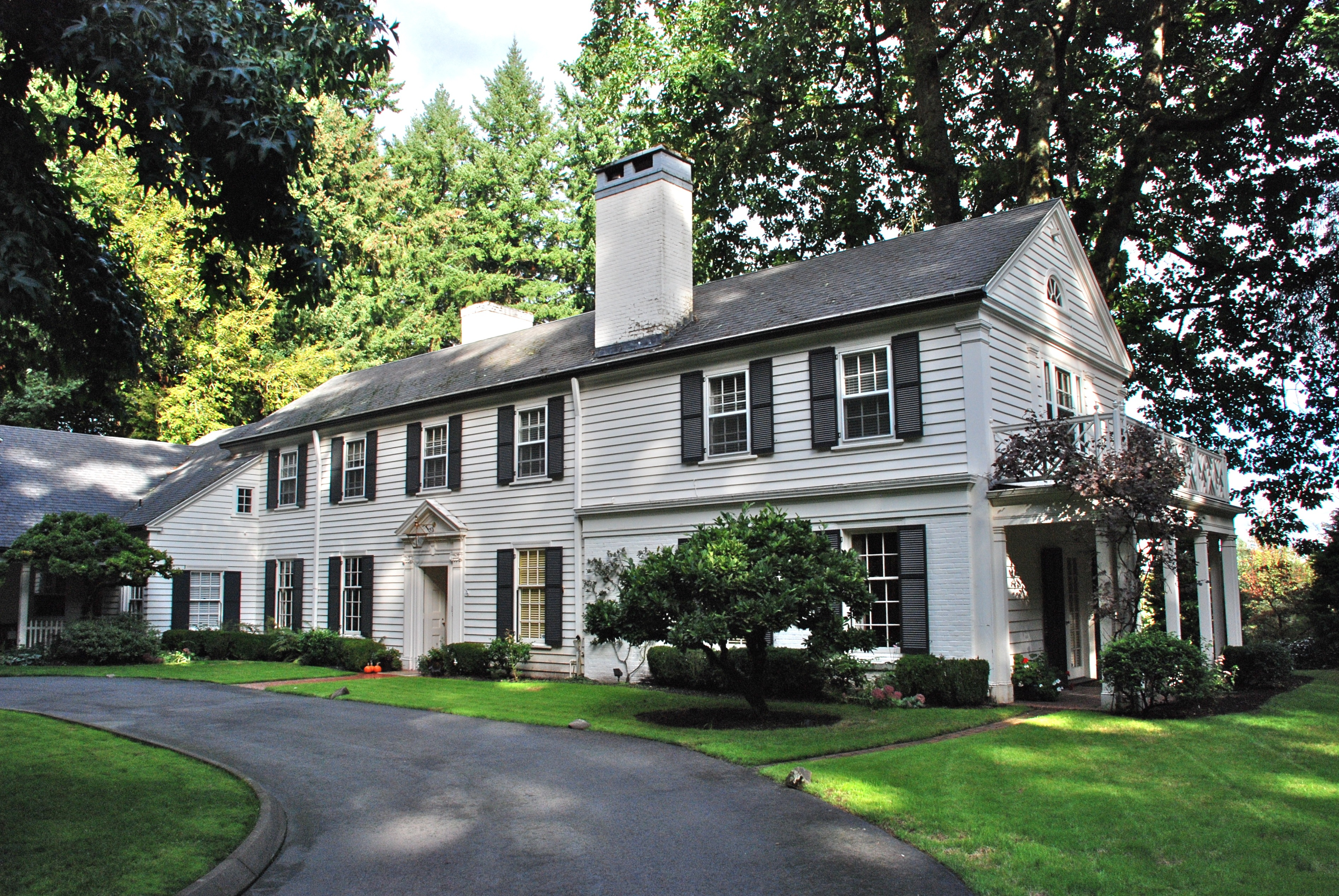
- The McGraw House in 2013
- Location: 01845 SW Military Road; Portland, Oregon
- Coordinates: 45°26′22″N 122°39′35″W
- Area: 3.5 acres (1.4 ha)
- Built: 1932
- Architect: Jamieson Parker
- Architectural style: Colonial Revival
- NRHP reference No.: 01000935
- Added to NRHP: September 3, 2001

The Donald and Ruth McGraw House, located in the Dunthorpe neighborhood of Multnomah County, Oregon, just outside the Portland municipal boundary, is listed on the National Register of Historic Places. It was the home of the late Donald and Ruth McGraw.

It was designed by architect Jamieson Parker.

== See also ==
- National Register of Historic Places listings in Multnomah County, Oregon
