= Orndoff-Cross House =

Historic house in West Virginia, United States

- U.S. National Register of Historic Places
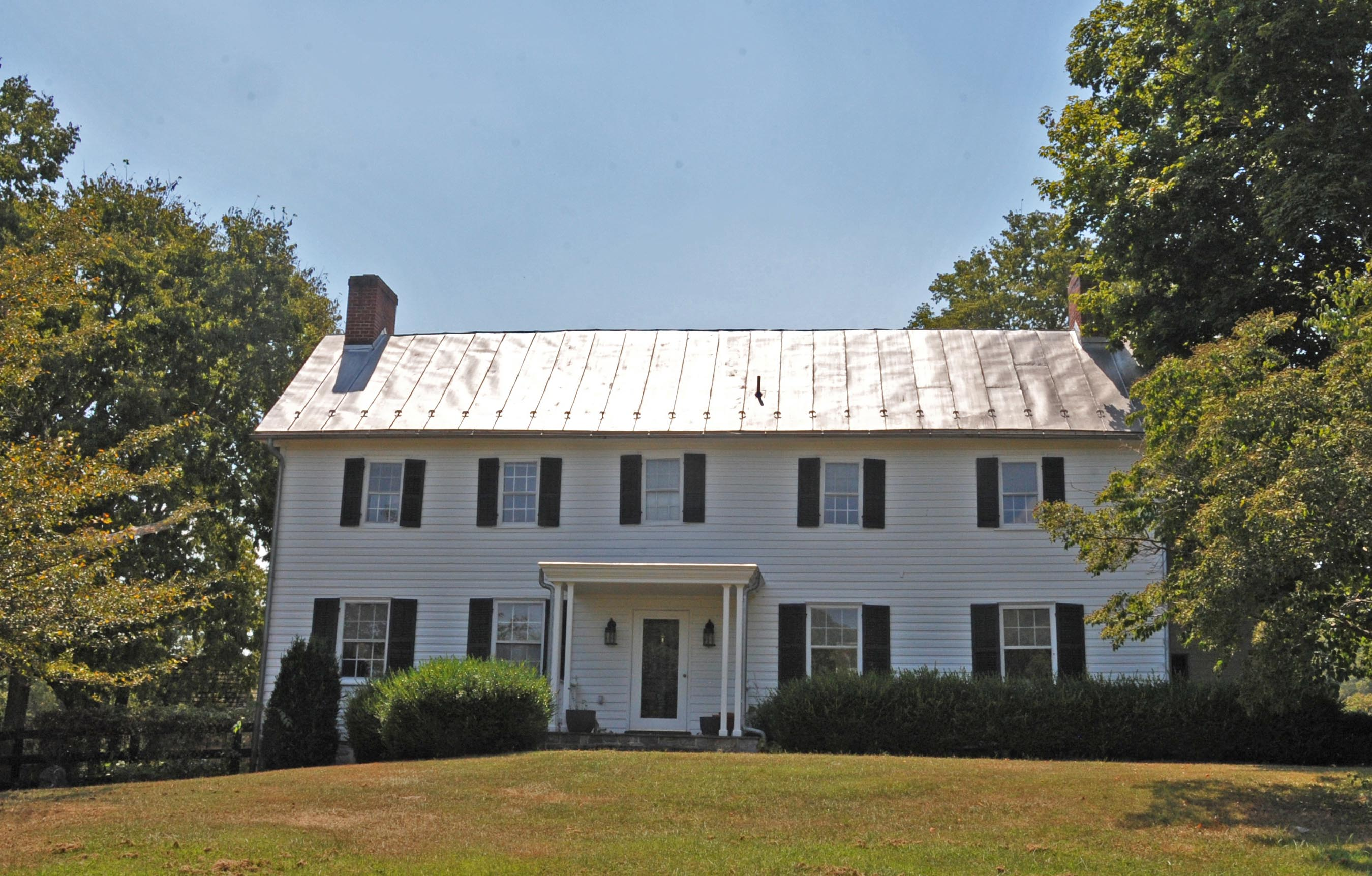

- Location within West Virginia Location within the United States
- Location: 6 Winebrenner Road, Martinsburg, West Virginia
- Coordinates: 39°26′9″N 77°51′38″W
- Area: less than one acre
- Built: c. 1796, c. 1830
- NRHP reference No.: 08001403
- Added to NRHP: July 28, 2010

Orndoff-Cross House, also known as the Henry Orndoff House, is a historic home located in Martinsburg, Berkeley County, West Virginia. It was built around 1796 and consists of a log house with additions. The earliest addition dates from about 1830 and the latest from the 1990s. It is a two-story vernacular residence topped by a standing seam metal, side gable roof. Also on the property is a meat-hanging shed of log construction (c. 1796).

It was listed on the National Register of Historic Places in 2010.
