= Kingsley House (Rehoboth, Massachusetts) =

Historic house in Massachusetts, United States

- U.S. National Register of Historic Places
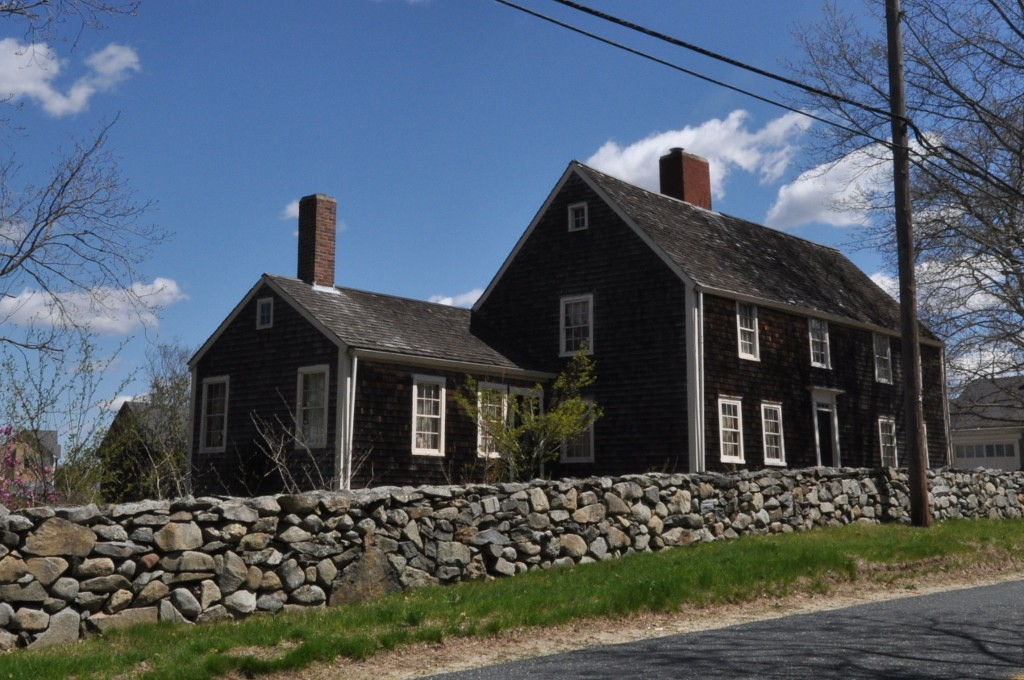

- Location within Massachusetts Location within the United States
- Location: 108 Davis St., Rehoboth, Massachusetts
- Coordinates: 41°46′44″N 71°15′48″W
- Built: 1680
- Architectural style: First Period
- MPS: Rehoboth MRA
- NRHP reference No.: 83000688
- Added to NRHP: June 6, 1983

The Kingsley House is a historic First Period house at 108 Davis Street in Rehoboth, Massachusetts in the United States. The oldest portion of this house is estimated to have been built around 1680, making it the oldest structure in Rehoboth. It was listed on the National Register of Historic Places in 1983, where it is listed at 96 Davis Street.

== Description and history ==
The Kingsley House is located in southernmost Rehoboth, in a rural-residential area. It is set on the north side of Davis Street, just west of its junction with Meadowlark Drive, on a lot fronted by low fieldstone wall. It is a 2 1/2-story timber-frame structure, with a gable roof, central chimney, and shingled exterior. The main facade is five bays wide, but there are deviations from symmetry, including only one window on the second floor left side. The rear of the main block is extended by a shed-roof extension down to the first floor, giving it a saltbox profile, and there is a single-story gabled ell extending to the main block.

The construction date of this house is not known, but it seems likely that the oldest portion of the house was built about 1680 by John Kingsley, as a three-bay "stone ender" house. This is based on the presence of a basement only under the eastern three bays. Differences in roof construction and window placement on either side of the central chimney indicate different construction periods, although both parts of the main block exhibit First Period construction methods, including heavy timber framing, chamfered beams, and gunstock posts. The stairs of the staircase were made by splitting square-cut timbers diagonally in half, and there is a chimney tree consisting of a single square-cut oak beam 16 inches (41 cm) in thickness. The rear leanto section was added before 1785, and the western ell is of 19th century construction. The house is probably the oldest in Rehoboth, and is one of its best-preserved 17th-century houses.

== See also ==
- Phillip Walker House, a First Period house with similar features in East Providence, Rhode Island
- National Register of Historic Places listings in Bristol County, Massachusetts
