= Edward D. Kingsley House =

Historic building in Portland, Oregon, U.S.

- U.S. National Register of Historic Places
- Portland Historic Landmark
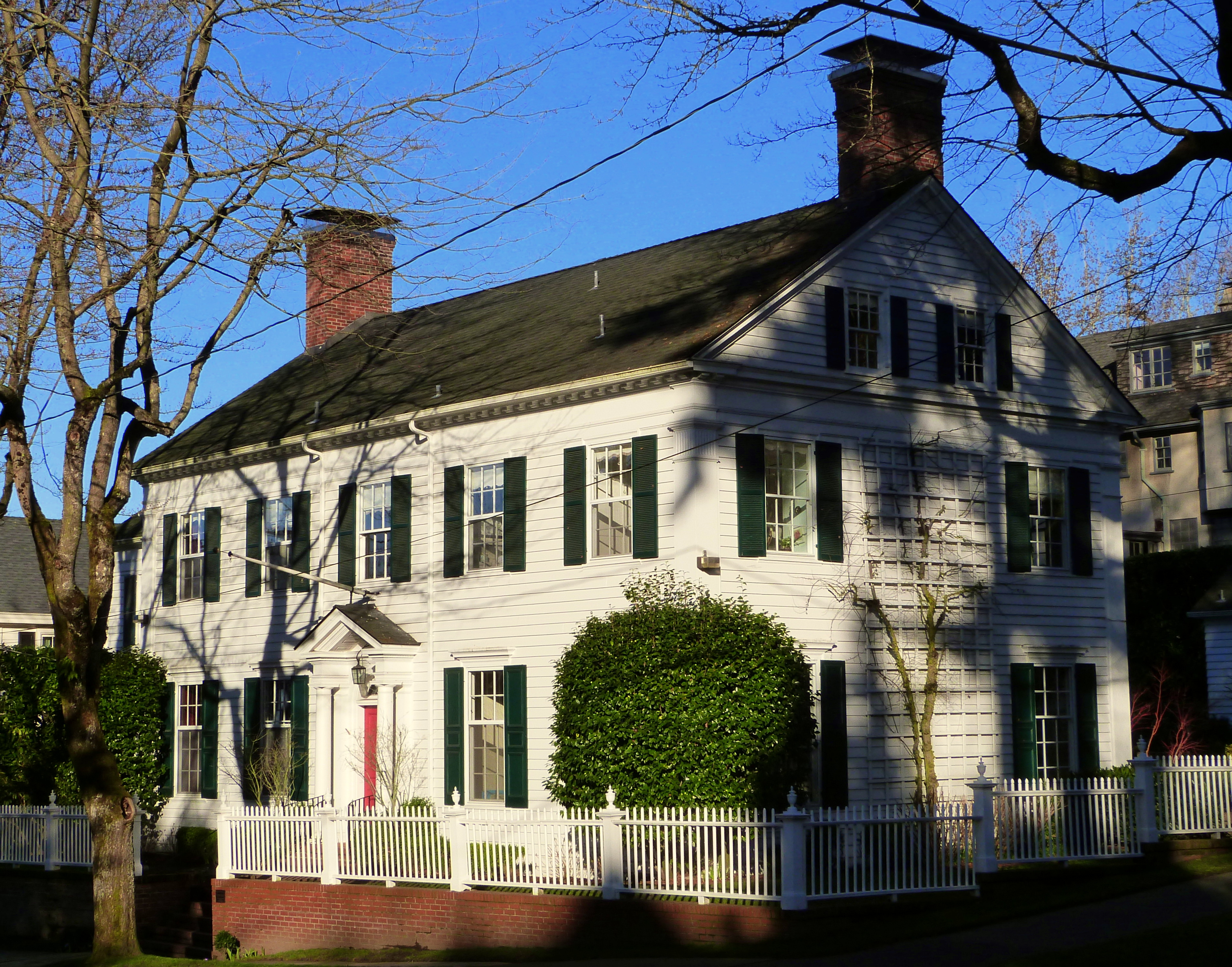
- The Kingsley House in 2013.

- Location within Portland, Oregon
- Location: 2132 SW Montgomery Drive; Portland, Oregon
- Coordinates: 45°30′43″N 122°41′59″W
- Area: 0.2 acres (0.081 ha)
- Built: 1927
- Architect: Jamieson K. Parker
- Architectural style: Colonial Revival
- NRHP reference No.: 90000283
- Added to NRHP: February 23, 1990

The Edward D. Kingsley House is a house located in southwest Portland, Oregon listed on the National Register of Historic Places.

== See also ==
- National Register of Historic Places listings in Southwest Portland, Oregon
