= Williams House (Odessa, Delaware) =

Historic house in Delaware, United States

- U.S. National Register of Historic Places
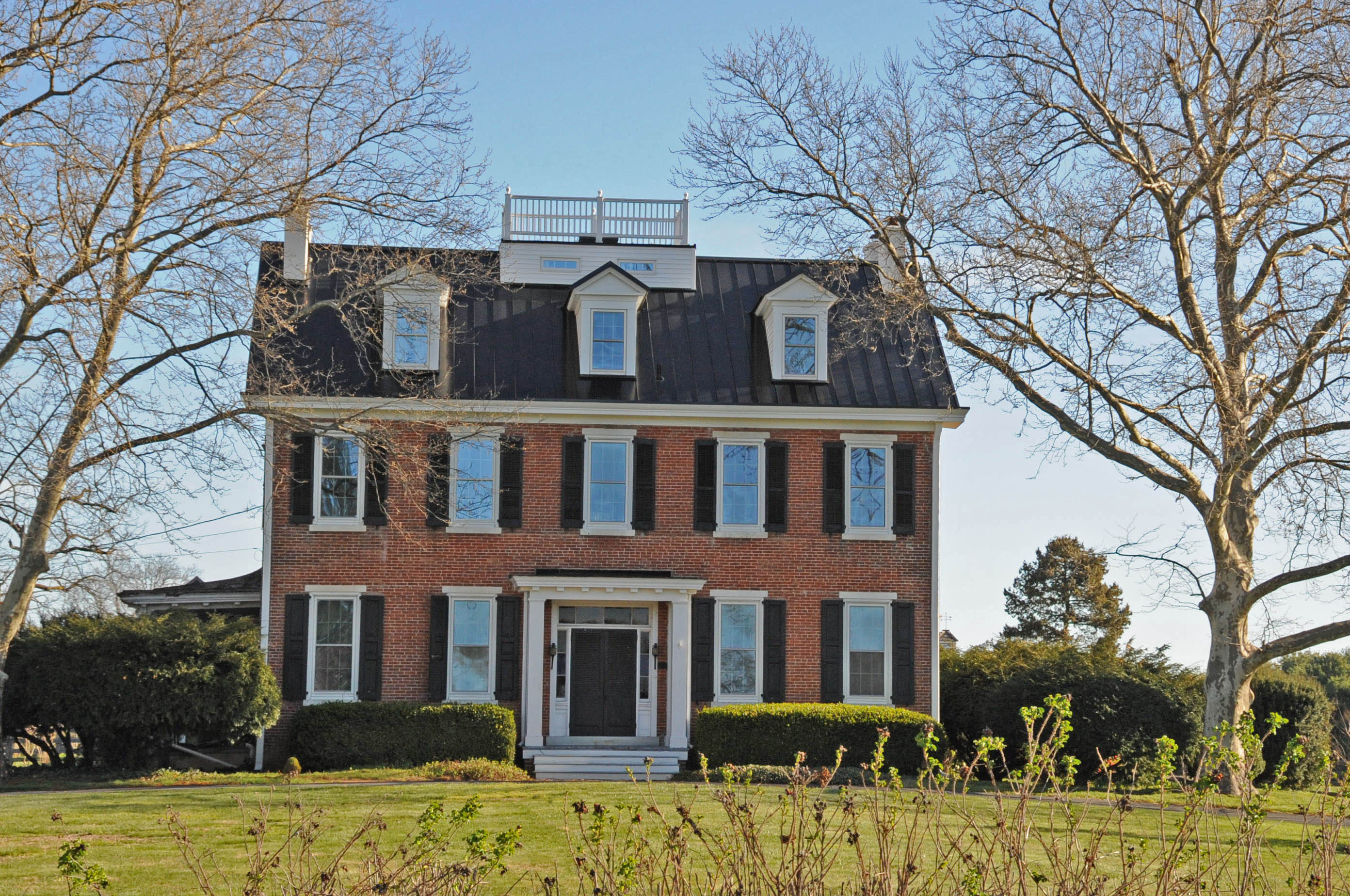

- Location within Delaware Location within the United States
- Location: 993 Marl Pit Road in St. Georges Hundred, near Odessa, Delaware
- Coordinates: 39.466712°N 75.680315°W
- Area: 1 acre (0.40 ha)
- Built: 1859
- Architectural style: Georgian
- NRHP reference No.: 73000536
- Added to NRHP: June 4, 1973

Williams House, also known as Woodlawn and Cross House, is a historic home located near Odessa, New Castle County, Delaware. It was built in 1859, and is 2 1/2-story, five-bay, brick dwelling with a gable roof in the Georgian style.

It was listed on the National Register of Historic Places in 1973.
