= John Raphael Rodrigues Brandon =

British architect and architectural writer

- Born: 5 April 1817; London, England
- Died: 8 October 1877 (aged 60)
- Occupations: British architect and architectural writer

John Raphael Rodrigues Brandon (5 April 1817 in London – 8 October 1877 at his chambers at 17 Clement's Inn, Strand, London) was a British Gothic Revival architect and architectural writer, much of whose work was done in collaboration with his brother Joshua, until the latter's death in 1847.

== Life ==
=== Training ===
Raphael Brandon was the second child of the six children of Joshua de Isaac Moses Rodrigues Brandon and his wife, Sarah. He studied with an architect named Dédeau in Alençon, France, before being apprenticed to Joseph T. Parkinson in 1836.

After his apprenticeship he set up in practice with his younger brother Joshua Arthur Rodrigues Brandon at Beaufort Buildings in the Strand, London. Following Joshua's early death in 1847, Raphael Brandon went into partnership with Robert Ritchie. This partnership was formally dissolved on 10 October 1856.

=== Publications ===
Both Raphael and Joshua Brandon were keen adherents of the Neo Gothic style and they jointly produced a series of three works on Early English ecclesiastical architecture that became and remained architectural pattern books for the whole 19th century:

- Analysis of Gothic Architecture (1847) – more than 700 examples of windows, doors, windows, and other architectural details, with measurements observed at first hand, collected from parish churches
- Parish Churches (1848) – 63 churches from across England, each with perspective views, a short description in text and a plan (to the same scale for all the churches)
- Open Timber Roofs of the Middle Ages (1849) – perspective, geometric and detail drawings of 35 timber roofs from parish churches in 11 different English counties, showing their form and principle of each example, with an introduction on the topic in general. The Builder commented that the work:

serves the one useful and necessary purpose of showing practically and constructively what the builders of the middle ages really did with the materials they had at hand, and how all those materials, whatever they were, were made to harmonise.

=== Buildings ===
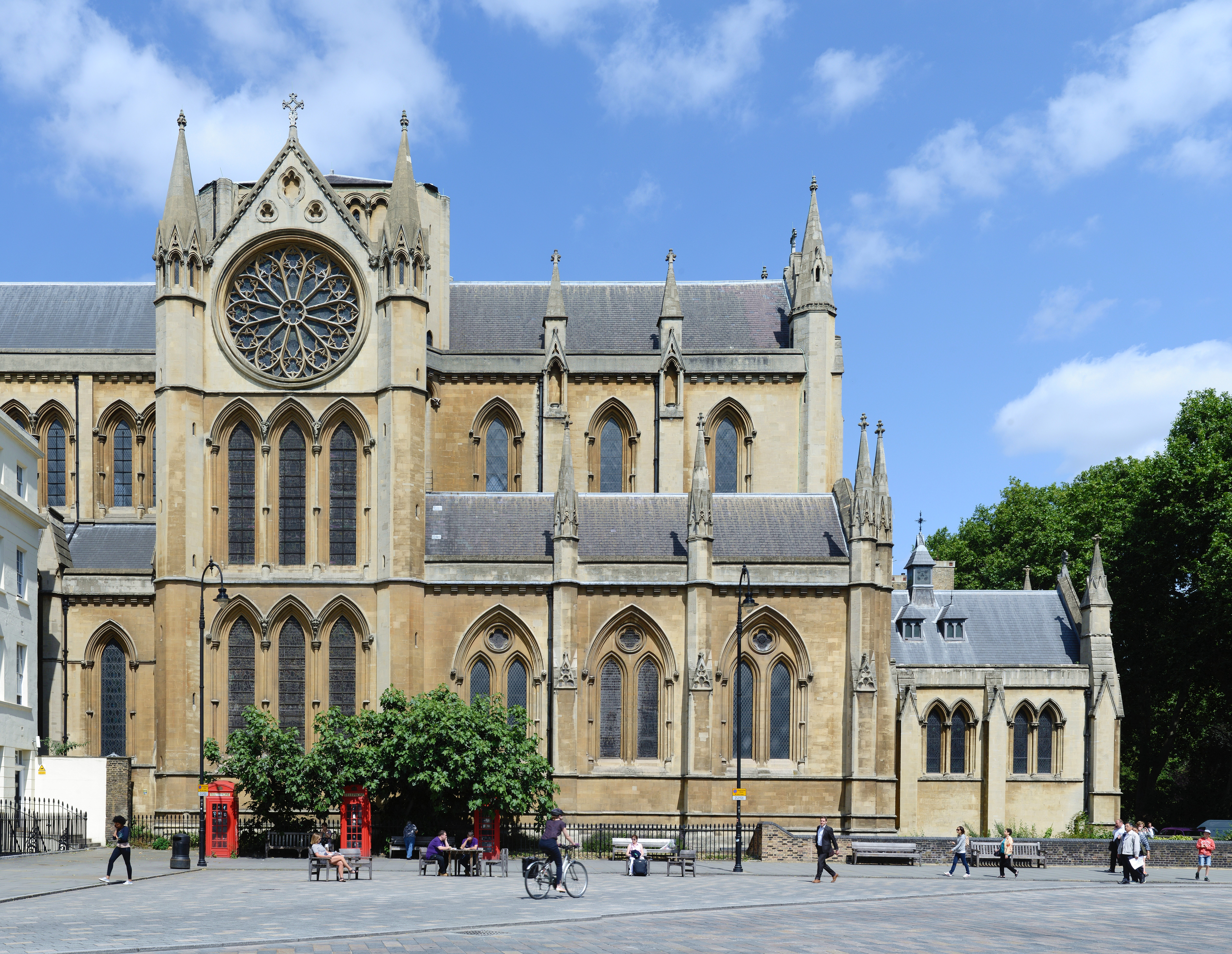
View of the south side of the east end of the Church of Christ the King in Bloomsbury

Although the Brandons were best known for their expertise in the Gothic Style, the Colchester Town Hall (1845, since demolished), the nearby Corn Exchange and The Royal Kent Dispensary building (by Brandon & Ritchie; later part of Miller General Hospital) in Greenwich High Road are all in the Classical style.

In the 1840s, Raphael and Joshua designed several stations and engine-houses in the style of medieval manor houses on the London and Croydon Railway, disguising chimneys as early Gothic church bell-towers. Raphael's exhibited designs at the Royal Academy between 1838 and 1874 included a design for Colchester Town Hall (1843, in his and John Blore's name – built in 1845).

=== Churches ===
In 1853, together with Robert Ritchie, Brandon exhibited a design for the interior of the Church of Christ the King, Bloomsbury for the Catholic Apostolic Church. Paying tribute to Brandon shortly after his death, Charles Barry said

...the most important work which he executed, and the one which brought him chiefly into notice as an ecclesiastical architect, was the Catholic Apostolic Church in Gordon Square. Of this remarkable building, which still remains uncompleted, it has frequently been said that it is a composition including many features more or less directly copied from old examples. But we must remember that it was begun at a period when the study of Gothic architecture was still immature, and when in the interest of our art it was better to copy correctly than to design with an originality which might not bear the test of criticism.

Raphael Brandon was also architect of the restoration of St Martin's Church, Leicester (now Leicester Cathedral.) This included the building of the tower (completed in 1862) and spire (1867). The work on this was in the correct Early English style, although his work elsewhere in the church was in the perpendicular style. The tower and spire, described by Pevsner as "intentionally impressive" are loosely based on those of the Church of St Mary the Virgin, Ketton in Rutland.

Among the many churches Brandon built independently were the small church of St Peter's in Great Windmill Street, London, and Holy Trinity Church, Knightsbridge (1861), both of which have since been demolished. He also built, altered, and restored many other churches. They include:

- Holy Trinity Leverstock Green, Hertfordshire (1846-9).
- All Saints, Sculthorpe, Norfolk. New Chancel (1846-7).
- Christ Church, Aughnamullen, County Monaghan, Ireland (1847) Extensive rebuilding of a church of c.1820. Much rebuilt in the 1860s, but Brandon's north aisle survives.
- Holy Trinity, Stow Bardolph, Norfolk.Extensive restoration. A description of Brandon's work there was published in the Gentleman's Magazine in October 1852.
- St Bene't, Cambridge. New North aisle (1853).
- All Saints, Harston, Cambridgeshire. Chancel(1853-4).
- St Mary, Humberstone, Leicestershire (1858). Major rebuilding leaving only the medieval tower and some fabric in the chancel.
- St Mary, Datchet.Berkshire, rebuilding in stages from 1857.
- Christ Church, Chesham (1864). Buckinghamshire
- St Andrew, Wraysbury, Berkshire
- Holy Trinity, Townshend Road, Richmond. London

== Death ==
Even Brandon becoming a fellow of the Royal Institute of British Architects in 1860 failed to bring him the same success as an active architect as he had had as an author and this, the early death of his brother Joshua, and the death of his wife and child, all drove him to suicide by shooting himself in the head.

Thomas Hardy, who worked briefly for Brandon, based his description of Henry Knight's chambers in his novel A Pair of Blue Eyes on his office at Clement's Inn. Brandon also employed James Rawson Carroll, architect of the Royal Victoria Eye and Ear Hospital, Dublin, Ireland.

== Sources ==
- "Brandon, John Raphael Rodrigues". Oxford Dictionary of National Biography (online ed.). Oxford University Press. doi:10.1093/ref:odnb/3264. (Subscription, Wikipedia Library access or UK public library membership required.)
- Dictionary of National Biography
- A. Felstead, J. Franklin, and L. Pinfield, eds., Directory of British architects, 1834–1900 (1993); 2nd edn, ed. A.Brodie and others, 2 vols.(2001)
- L. D. Barnett and others, eds., Bevis Marks records: being contributions to the history of the Spanish and Portuguese Congregation in London, 5 vols. (1940–93)
- The Builder, 35 (1877), 1041, 1051–2
- The Builder, 5 (1847), 603
- E. Jamilly, ‘Anglo-Jewish architects, and architecture in the 18th and 19th centuries’, Transactions of the Jewish Historical Society of England, 18 (1953–55), 127–41, esp. 135–6
- Algernon Graves, The Royal Academy of Arts: a complete dictionary of contributors and their work from its foundation in 1769 to 1904, 8 vols.(1905–06), (1970), (1972)
- G. Stamp and C. Amery, Victorian buildings of London, 1837–1887: an illustrated guide (1980), 40–41 ·
- The architect's, engineer's, and building-trades' directory (1868)
- Catalogue of the drawings collection of the Royal Institute of British Architects, Royal Institute of British Architects, 20 vols. (1969–89)
- C. Barry, Sessional Papers of the Royal Institute of British Architects (1877–78), 10
