= Chester Kingsley House =

Historic house in Massachusetts, United States

- U.S. National Register of Historic Places
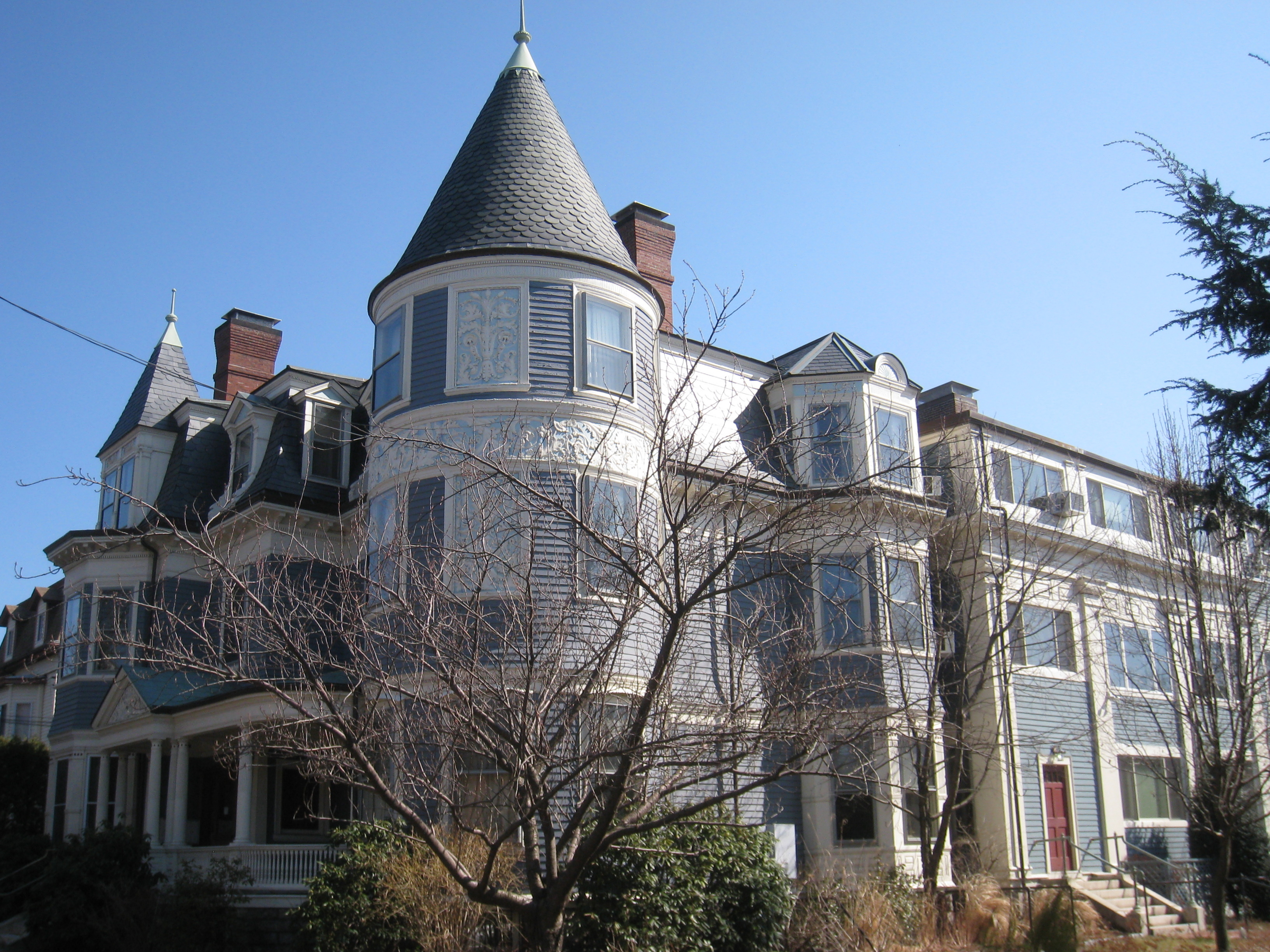

- Location within Massachusetts Location within the United States
- Location: 10 Chester Street, Cambridge, Massachusetts
- Coordinates: 42°23′36.3″N 71°07′27.7″W
- Built: 1866
- Built by: Stephen Stiles (1866); Wellington Fillmore (1890)
- Architect: William Sidebottom (1919)
- Architectural style: Second Empire, Queen Anne
- MPS: Cambridge MRA
- NRHP reference No.: 82001954
- Added to NRHP: April 13, 1982

The Chester Kingsley House is an historic house in Cambridge, Massachusetts.

== Description and history ==
The oldest portion of this architecturally eclectic house was built in 1866, with Second Empire styling. The original owner was Chester W. Kingsley, a local politician, and the builder was Stephen Stiles. Kingsley had the house remodeled in 1890, adding a tower and ell. At the same time, the house's Second Empire ornament was replaced with Queen Anne and Colonial Revival ornament. Wellington Fillmore was the builder who executed the work. Kingsley and his wife lived in the house until their deaths in 1904. In 1908 the house was leased by Mae I. Copp and Minnie A. Copp as a private hospital, which became known as the Chester Hospital. During the occupancy of the Copp sisters, the house was altered several times, most substantially in 1919, when architect William Sidebottom designed a three-story extension to the ell.

The house was later a nursing home, and is now apartments. It was listed on the National Register of Historic Places in 1982.

== See also ==
- National Register of Historic Places listings in Cambridge, Massachusetts
