= Buses in Portsmouth =

Public transport in the city of Portsmouth, England

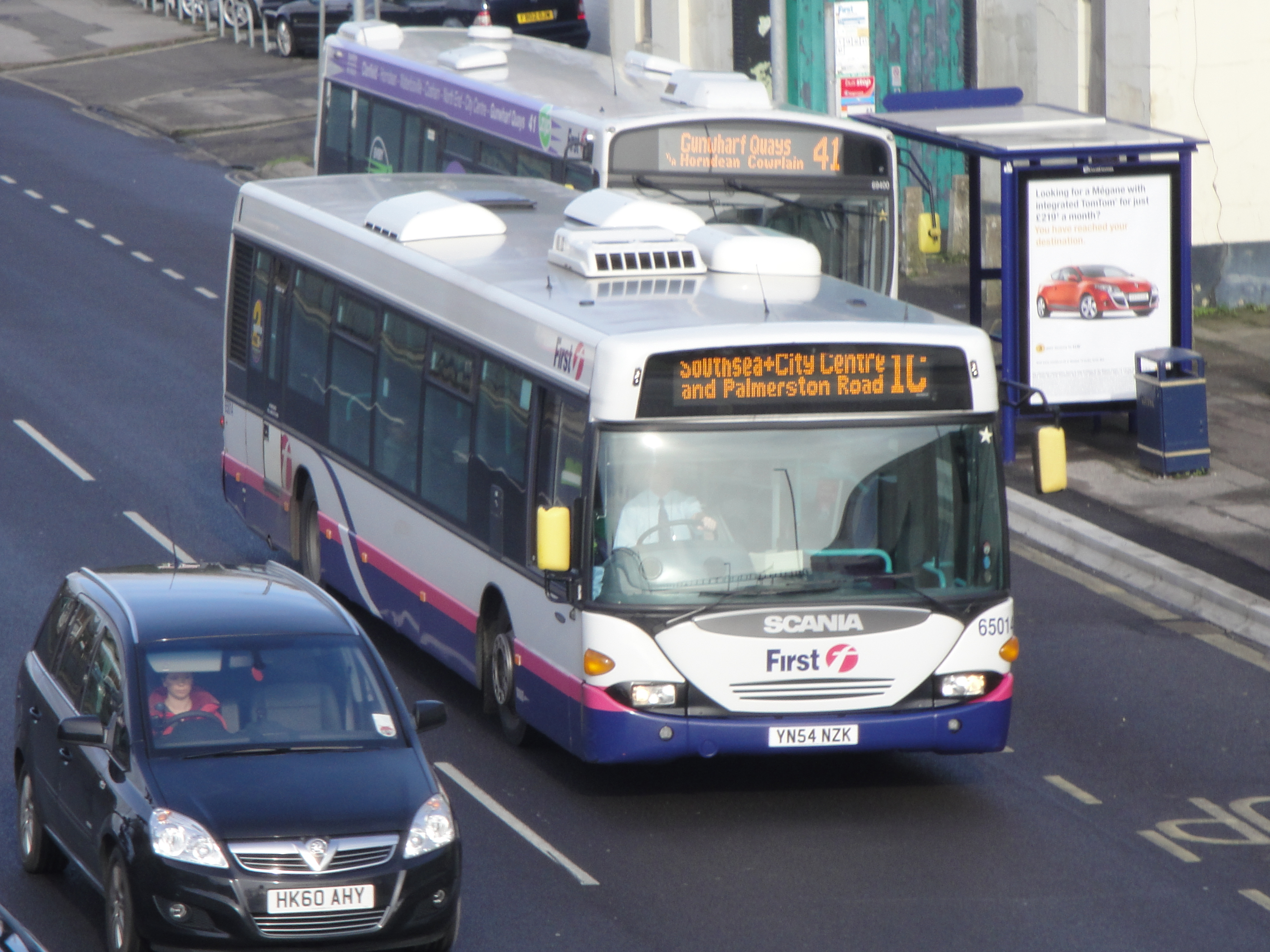
A low-floor single-deck vehicle of First Hampshire & Dorset in service in Portsmouth during 2011

Buses in Portsmouth are a form of public transport in the city of Portsmouth, England. Motor bus services in Portsmouth began in 1919, and were expanded in the 1930s following the closure of the Portsmouth Corporation Transport tram network. Trolleybuses were also operated between 1934 and 1963. Until 1988 the majority of services were provided by Portsmouth Corporation Transport, a municipal bus company owned by Portsmouth City Council. Other services into the city were operated by Southdown Motor Services, latterly as a subsidiary of the National Bus Company.

Prior to bus deregulation and the privatisation of National Bus Company in 1986, the Gosport and Fareham Omnibus Company was merged with the western part of Hants & Dorset in April 1983 to form the Provincial Bus Company which was sold to its employees in 1987 and renamed People's Provincial which then expanded into Portsmouth in the early 1990s. Southdown was sold to its management at privatisation. The municipal operation was sold to a consortium consisting of its employees and Southampton Citybus in 1988, and was rebranded as Portsmouth Citybus. In 1989 both Southdown and Portsmouth Citybus were sold to the Stagecoach Group, but the group was forced to divest most of the Portsmouth services and they were sold to Transit Holdings in 1991. The expanding FirstGroup acquired People's Provincial in 1995 and the Transit Holdings operation, by now trading as Red Admiral and Blue Admiral in 1996. The group's later acquisition of Southampton Citybus and Southern National saw the companies combined to form First Hampshire & Dorset, which provides the majority of services in the city today. Stagecoach in the South Downs, the name under which Southdown now trades, operates longer-distance services.

Coach services into Portsmouth are operated by National Express, which runs several routes to the city. Greyhound UK, a division of FirstGroup, served the city between 2009 and 2012. A coach service to Southampton operated by Solent Blue Line was withdrawn in 2009.

== Urban services ==
=== Beginnings (pre-1919) ===
The first horse-drawn omnibus service in Portsmouth began in 1840, and by the late 1850s such services had expanded to cover several different route. Horse-drawn trams were introduced in 1865, and progressively expanded over the following three decades. By the 1890s most of the horse trams and many of the omnibus routes were operated by the Portsmouth Street Tramways Company which was a subsidiary of the Provincial Tramways Company. In 1904, the last omnibus service was withdrawn. The tram system was purchased by Portsmouth Town Council and converted to electric operation in 1901, by which time it was operated as Portsmouth Corporation Transport (PCT).

Early attempts to introduce motorised buses to the city, including in 1906 by the Isle of Wight Motor Bus Company, proved unsuccessful. In 1906 and again in 1911, the council turned down proposals to supplement the tram network with buses. However, in 1919 ten vehicles were introduced on a single route, beginning an operation that would last for almost 70 years.

=== Council operations (1919–1986) ===
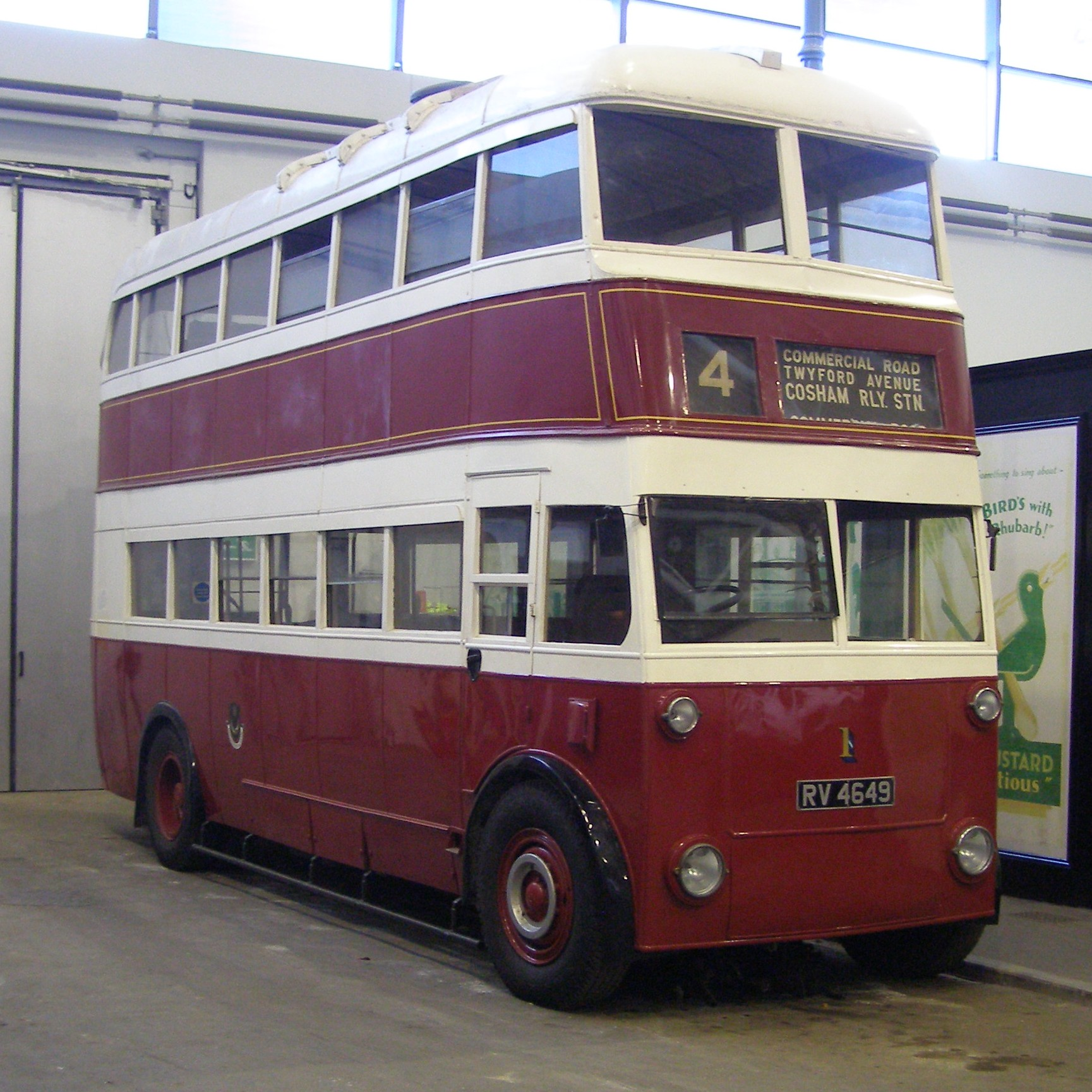
A preserved AEC trolleybus new to Portsmouth Corporation Transport in 1934

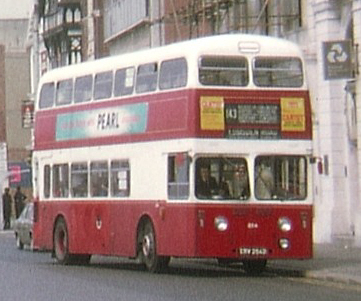
A 1973 view of a Leyland Atlantean bus in service with PCT

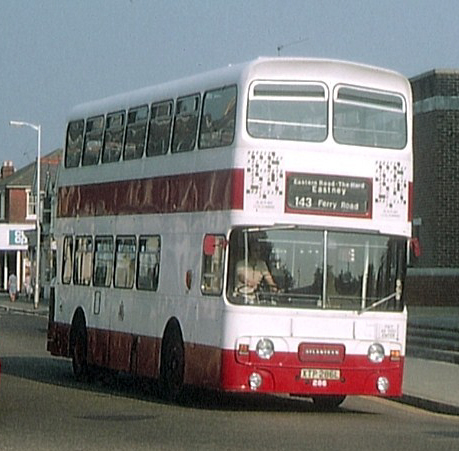
A newer Leyland Atlantean with Alexander bodywork in service in 1975

PCT soon faced competition from two private operators, Portsmouth & District Motor Services Ltd and the Southsea Tourist Company, who ran bus services over routes covered by the tram network. Twelve vehicles were added to the fleet in 1924 and two new routes introduced. One of the new routes, which originally terminated at Cosham, was extended to Drayton in 1925 in competition with a route provided by Southdown Motor Services, which retaliated by running more journeys into Portsmouth. A change in legislation in 1927 saw the routes return to their original form. The corporation's livery, previously scarlet and ochre, was changed to red and white in 1931 in response to Portsmouth gaining city status four years earlier.

The tram system began to decline in the 1930s. Trolleybus services replaced trams on one route in 1934, and by November 1936, all tram services in Portsmouth had been withdrawn. Bus and trolleybus services were reduced during World War II, when the city's dockyards were a target for bombing and its population depleted by evacuation and military service. Unusually, at this time there were two numbers (or letters for trolleybuses) for each route, depending on the direction, and this continued post-war. This was useful as many routes were convoluted or included complete loops (e.g. 1/2 Paulsgrove-Cosham-Commercial Road-Southsea-Copnor-Cosham). In 1946 an agreement was reached between PCT and Southdown to operate jointly on some routes. Leigh Park, which expanded rapidly after the war, was served for the first time in 1949; although this was intended to be a short-term measure prior to the introduction of trolleybus services, the route was never served by trolleybuses.

A number of new vehicles were added to the bus fleet in the late 1940s and 1950s, and in 1958 one-person operation was introduced. Trolleybus operation in Portsmouth ended in July 1963. From 1963 until the late 1970s PCT standardised on the double-deck Leyland Atlantean for new purchases, retaining much older vehicles for open-top services. In 1971 the company took the unusual step of purchasing twelve Atlanteans with single-deck bodywork.

Passenger numbers declined in the following decades, and services were reduced. PCT began private hire operation in 1980, and purchased its first coach in 1986. In October 1986, to coincide with bus deregulation and the privatisation of National Bus Company (NBC), Portsmouth Corporation Transport was reformed as Portsmouth City Transport, a limited company wholly owned by the city council.

=== Deregulation and changes of operator (1986–1991) ===
In 1987, a new operator began competing with Portsmouth City Transport. Trading as Red Admiral, it was jointly owned by newly privatised Southampton Citybus and the rapidly expanding Badgerline group. Badgerline sold its share in the venture to Southampton Citybus after less than a year.

In June 1988, Portsmouth City Transport was privatised. It was sold to a joint venture consisting of its employees and Southampton Citybus. The company was rebranded as Portsmouth Citybus and Red Admiral became a subsidiary of the company, operating largely with minibuses. While the main operation continued to use a variant of the red and ivory livery introduced in 1986, Red Admiral vehicles were painted into a red and black colour scheme. However, Citybus still faced strong competition from Southdown and People's Provincial, two former NBC subsidiaries which were now independent, and its finances were never entirely secure during its year of operation in this form.

In October 1989, the Stagecoach Group bought Portsmouth Citybus. The group already owned Southdown, which it had bought earlier in the same year, and merged the Portsmouth-area operations of that company with its new acquisition to form Southdown Portsmouth, operating from the former council depot in Eastney. Southdown's depot in Hilsea was closed and its operations transferred to Eastney. As part of the purchase, Stagecoach agreed that two routes operated by its Hampshire Bus subsidiary in Southampton would be given up to Southampton Citybus. Vehicles began to be repainted into Stagecoach's corporate livery of white with red, blue and orange stripes.

An inquiry by the Monopolies and Mergers Commission (MMC) into Stagecoach's acquisition of Portsmouth Citybus concluded in July 1990 that the takeover was against the public interest but had not caused any adverse effects, and that Stagecoach should not be made to sell the operation. Both Portsmouth City Council and Hampshire County Council, together with a number of bus user groups in the area and the employees' trade unions, had supported the takeover, as it was felt that Citybus could not have continued to trade in the long term. However, the decision by the MMC was over-ruled by Nicholas Ridley, then the Secretary of State for Trade and Industry and credited as the architect of bus deregulation.

=== Transit Holdings and FirstGroup (1991–present) ===
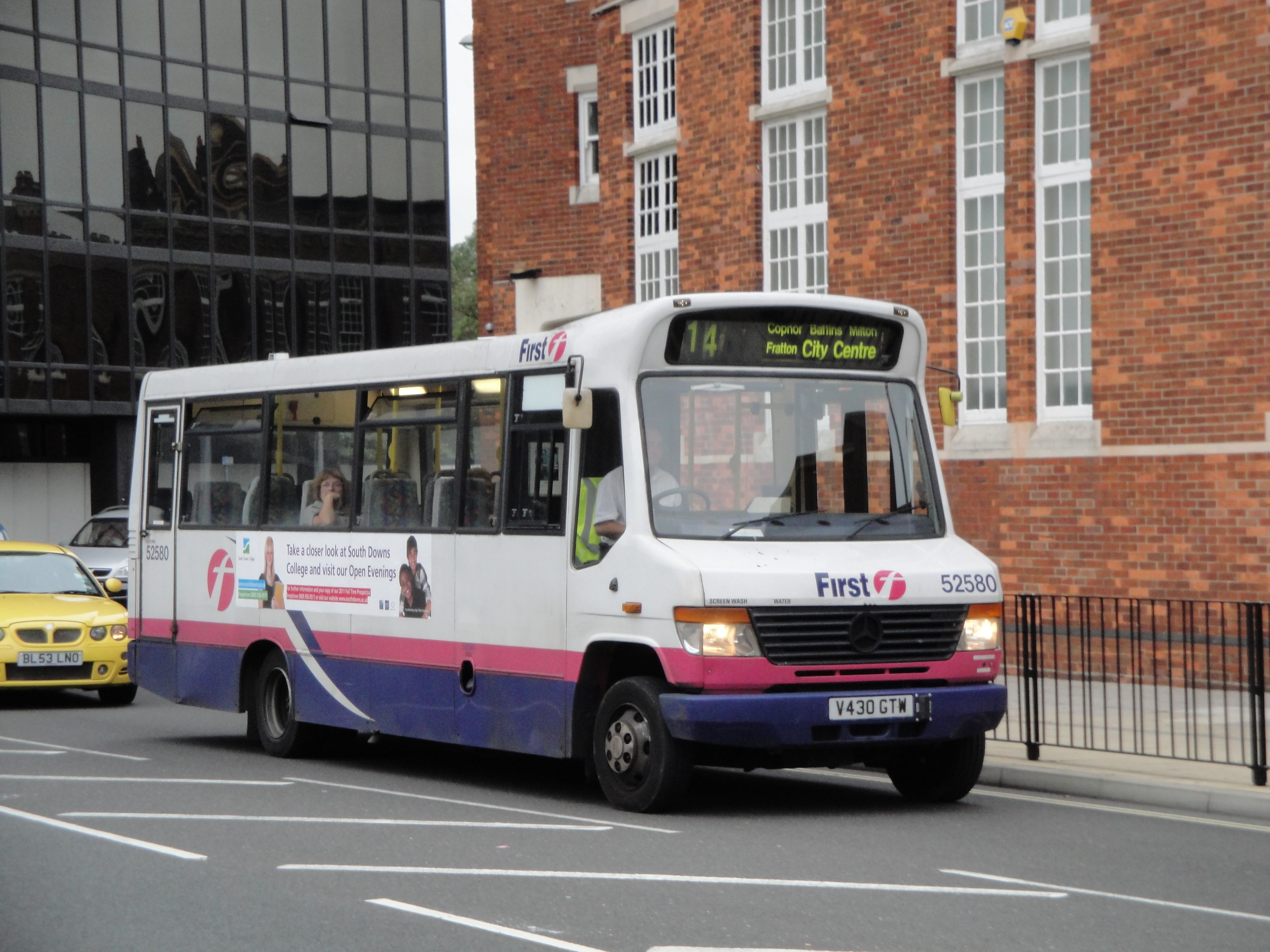
A Mercedes-Benz minibus of First Hampshire & Dorset in Portsmouth. Older Mercedes-Benz minibuses were operated by Transit Holdings in Portsmouth.

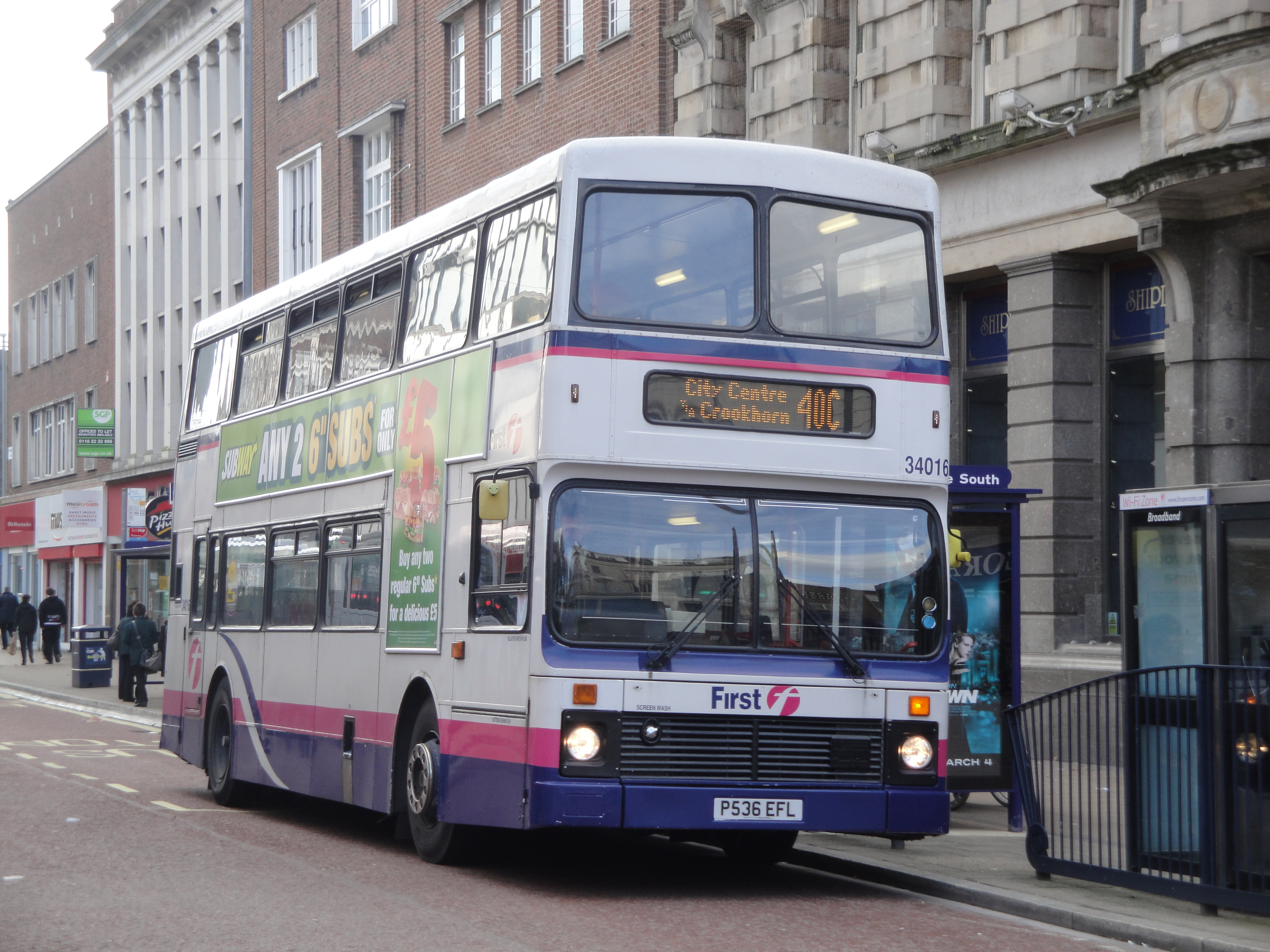
A First double-deck Volvo Olympian in service in the city

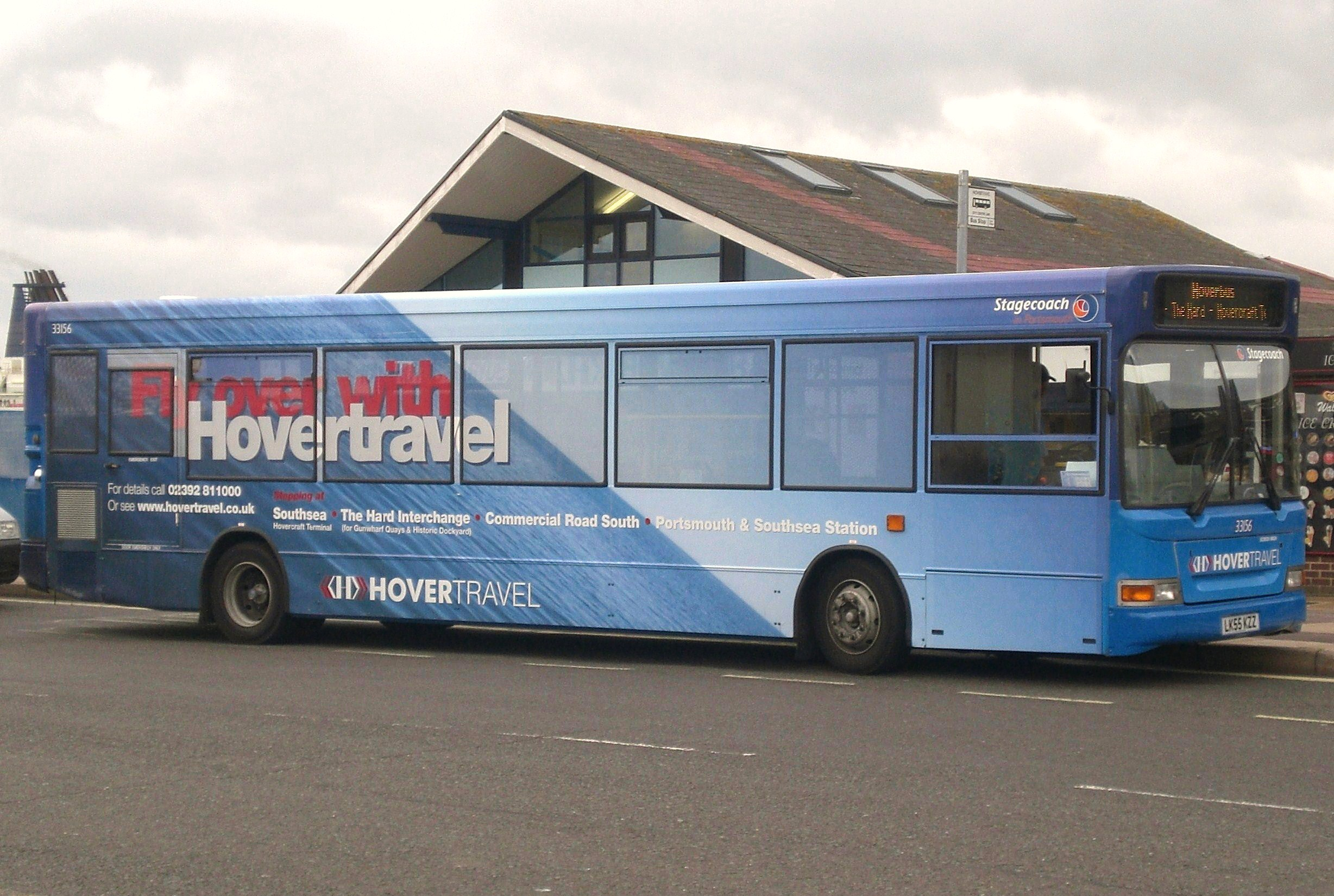
A Dennis Dart SLF bus in Hovertravel livery on the Hoverbus service at the Southsea Hoverport

On 20 January 1991, Stagecoach's operations in Portsmouth were sold to Transit Holdings, a group formed from the privatisation of Devon General. The company's lease on the depot in Eastney expired in May, so the former Southdown depot at Hilsea West was reopened and used by Transit Holdings. Stagecoach retained a small number of services into the city which had been operated by Southdown prior to 1989, but others, including the route to Fareham, transferred to the new operation.

Under Transit Holdings ownership, bus operation in Portsmouth was completely remodelled. The Red Admiral name was revived as a trading name for services running to areas outside the city boundary, while Blue Admiral was introduced for routes entirely within the city. The entire fleet was replaced with minibuses, initially Ford Transits and later Iveco Daily vehicles for Blue Admiral and Mercedes-Benz 811D vehicles for Red Admiral services. Service frequencies rose to retain capacity, and Transit Holdings claimed that ridership had risen dramatically. However, some groups criticised the use of minibuses as having poor accessibility and giving uncomfortable ride quality.

Transit Holdings began to contract in the mid-1990s, and in April 1996 the Portsmouth operation was sold to FirstGroup. A month later it was merged with People's Provincial, which First also owned, and a new livery of red and cream was introduced to the enlarged company. Larger vehicles were restored to replace minibuses on most routes. In 2003 Provincial was further merged with Southampton Citybus and the eastern part of Southern National, both earlier acquired by First, to form First Hampshire & Dorset, officially based at the former Southampton Citybus depot in Portswood.

In December 2006 First Hampshire & Dorset was fined by the Traffic Commissioner for poor punctuality on its services in Portsmouth. The company stated that it had rerouted some services through the city to improve their performance. The provision of evening services in the city has been criticised by some local groups. In May 2011, some contracted journeys were cut after the city council was forced to implement spending cuts.

One route entirely within the city is provided by First Hampshire & Dorset Branded as Hoverbus, it is operated in conjunction with Hovertravel and connects the Southsea Hoverport with Portsmouth Harbour and the railway station at Portsmouth and Southsea. This was previously run by Tellings-Golden Miller as their only bus service in the city, however on the loss of their National Express contracts to Lucketts Travel their Portsmouth depot was closed in January 2009 and the bus and operation of the route transferred to Stagecoach.

An inter-site bus service is operated by the University of Portsmouth to transport staff and students between different parts of the university. In summer 2012, Xelabus introduced an open-top service between The Hard and Eastney, restoring a form of service which had previously been common in the city but had ceased in 2002; however, the service was withdrawn in August 2012.

== Long-distance services ==
=== Early years and nationalisation (1920–1987) ===
Services originating outside the city were established in the 1920s by Southdown Motor Services and Hants & Dorset. The first was a joint route between Portsmouth and Southampton, introduced in 1922; this was followed a year later by a route linking the city to Winchester. In 1924, the routes were split at Fareham, with only Southdown continuing to serve Portsmouth. At least, in latter years, the dividing line locally seemed to be the A32, serviced by Southdown as far North as Meon Hut, although Hants & Dorset and Southdown shared a route to Warsash, with H&D terminating at Fareham, but Southdown going on to Portsmouth. Two smaller operators in the area, Yellow Motor Service and Enterprise, were taken over by Hants & Dorset in 1924, returning their vehicles to Portsmouth.

Some Southdown routes did not initially reach Portsmouth city centre, but stopped short in nearby suburbs, an early example being a route between Cosham and Drayton. In 1925, PCT extended one of its routes to cover this section. In response, Southdown extended its route to serve Portsmouth city centre. The routes reverted to their original form in 1927. During the 1930s, Southdown maintained a bus station in Portsmouth. In 1946 the company arranged an agreement with PCT to enable joint running on routes in Portsmouth.

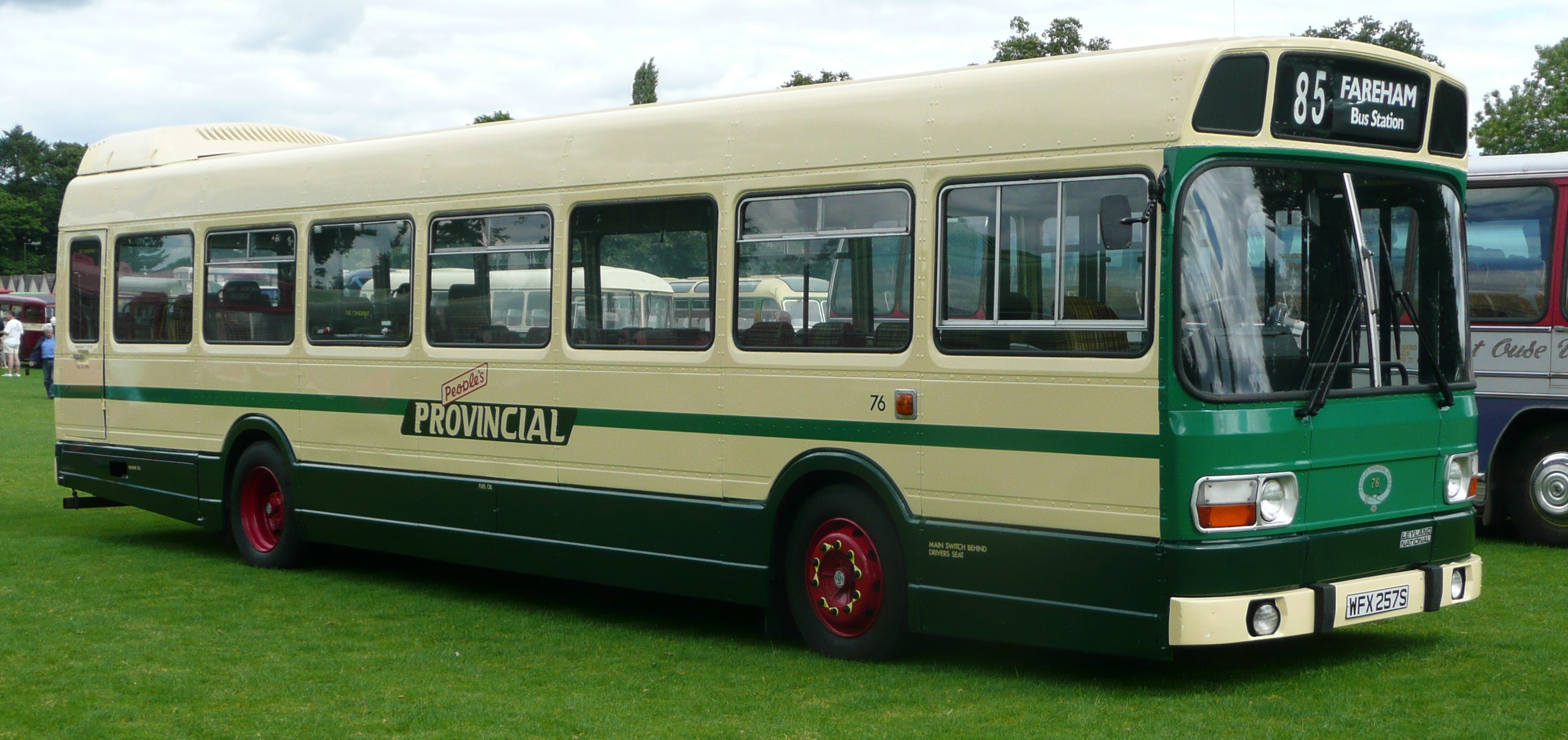
A preserved Leyland National used by People's Provincial in the 1980s

Both Southdown and Hants & Dorset became part of the newly formed National Bus Company in 1968. A new route, the 32, currently the 700, along the coast from Portsmouth to Brighton was introduced by Southdown in 1975.

In 1983, Hants & Dorset was split to form four new companies. The eastern end of its former operating area, which included its few services into Portsmouth, were merged with the former Gosport & Fareham Omnibus Company to form the Provincial Bus Co. When NBC was privatised in the mid-1980s, Provincial was the only company to be sold under an Employee Share Ownership Plan, becoming independent in May 1987. Southdown was sold to its management in October 1987, and both companies quickly made changes.

=== Deregulation and ownership changes (1987–present) ===
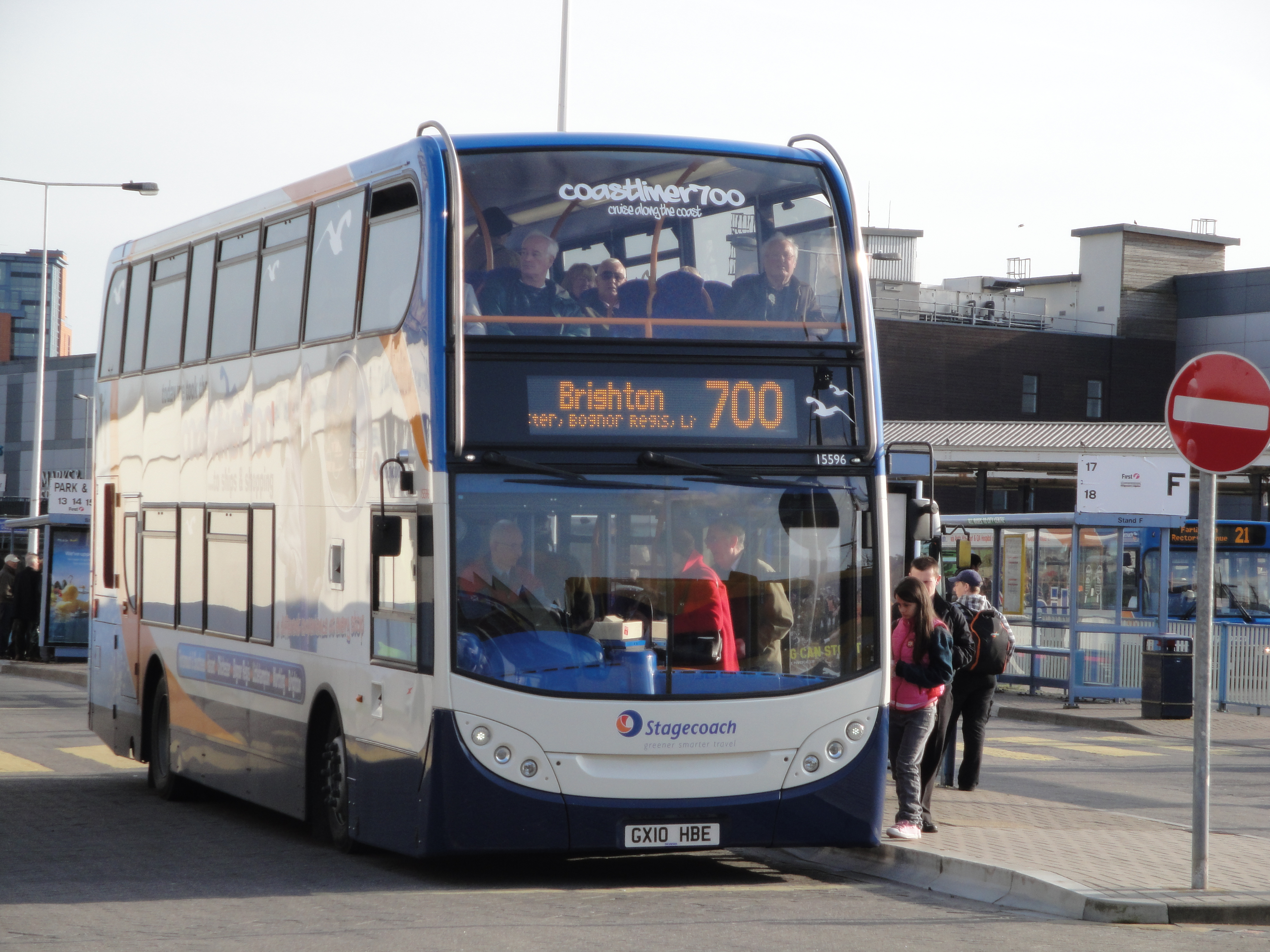
A Scania N230UD double-decker of Stagecoach in the South Downs operating route 700 to Brighton in 2010

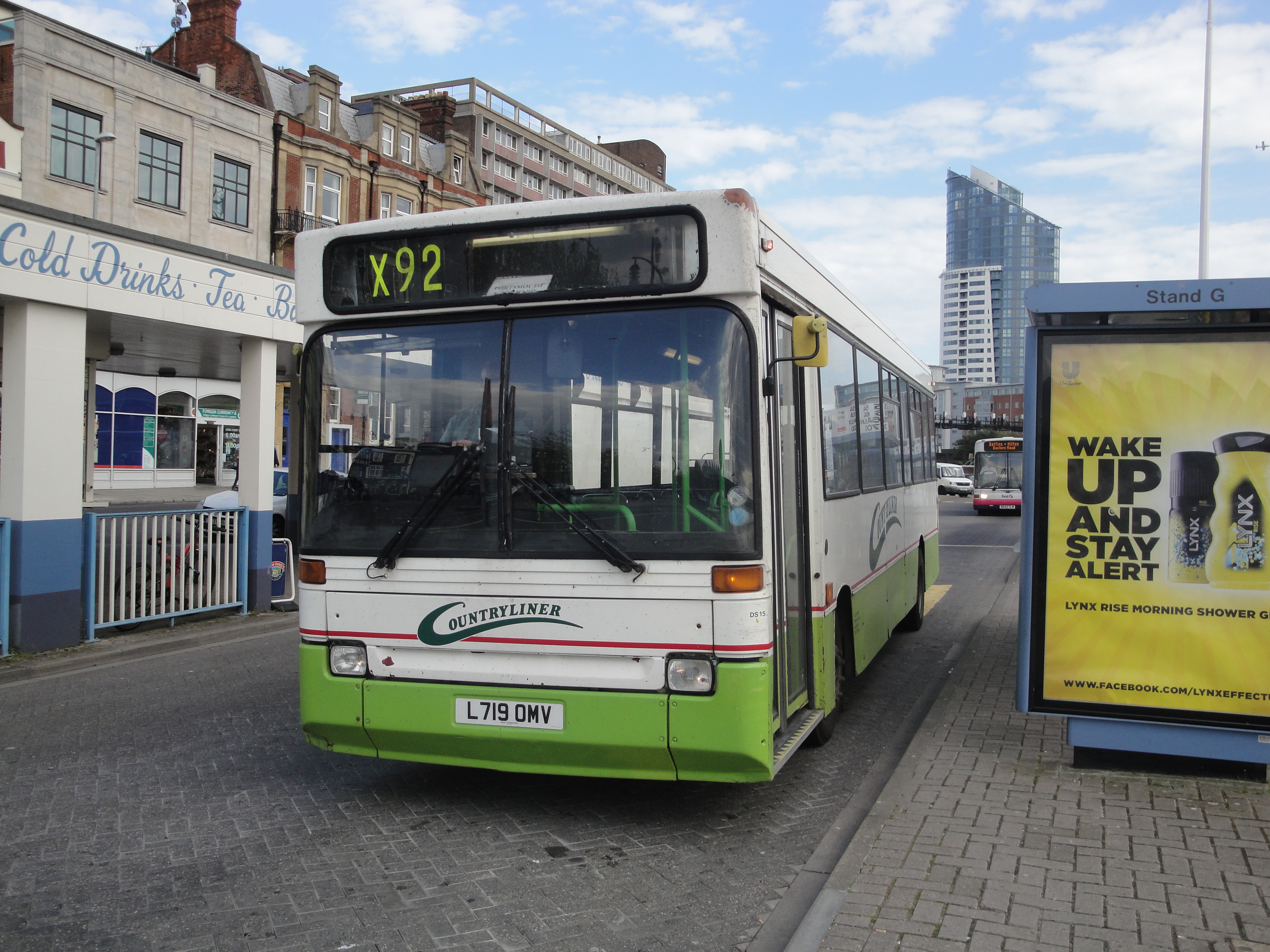
A May 2010 view at The Hard Interchange of a Countryliner Dennis Dart on route X92

Following privatisation, Southdown reintroduced its pre-1968 colours of light green and cream. It was taken over by the Stagecoach Group in August 1989. Two months later the same group acquired Portsmouth Citybus and merged the latter with the majority of Southdown's operations in the city to form Southdown Portsmouth. Southdown's depot at Hilsea was closed and operations moved to the former Portsmouth Citybus depot at Eastney. Stagecoach was forced to sell its Portsmouth operations, which passed to Transit Holdings in January 1991, together with the Hilsea site, which was reopened. Southdown retained a small number of services in the city, but its presence was reduced from that prior to 1989. Southdown's legal name was changed to South Coast Buses in April 1992, and its western operations were rebranded to Coastline Buses.

Provincial, meanwhile, rebranded itself as People's Provincial, using a dark green and cream livery. It substantially expanded its operations in Portsmouth after Transit Holdings acquired Portsmouth Citybus, believing that its use of minibuses had left a gap in demand for services using larger vehicles. Former NBC vehicles such as the double-deck Bristol VR and single-deck Leyland National were used on most routes. The company was taken over by FirstGroup in October 1995. First acquired Portsmouth Citybus from Transit in April 1996 and merged the two under the Provincial name, giving the company complete dominance over routes within Portsmouth. Like PCT, it is now part of First Hampshire & Dorset.

Coastline Buses continued to be used as a trading name by Stagecoach until 2003, when its depot in Eastbourne was closed and the surviving operations rebranded to Stagecoach in the South Downs. The name Stagecoach in Portsmouth was adopted for its services around the city.

Stagecoach introduced 21 new buses to route 700, the Brighton-Portsmouth service introduced in 1975, after its passenger numbers doubled in five years up to 2010. The route is branded as "Coastliner", and has its own website.

Countryliner, an independent operator, also served Portsmouth during the early 21st century. One journey per week in each direction ran on route X92, a Saturday-only service originating in Midhurst operated under contract to West Sussex County Council. The route was withdrawn in October 2011 following cuts to council funding.

== Coaches ==
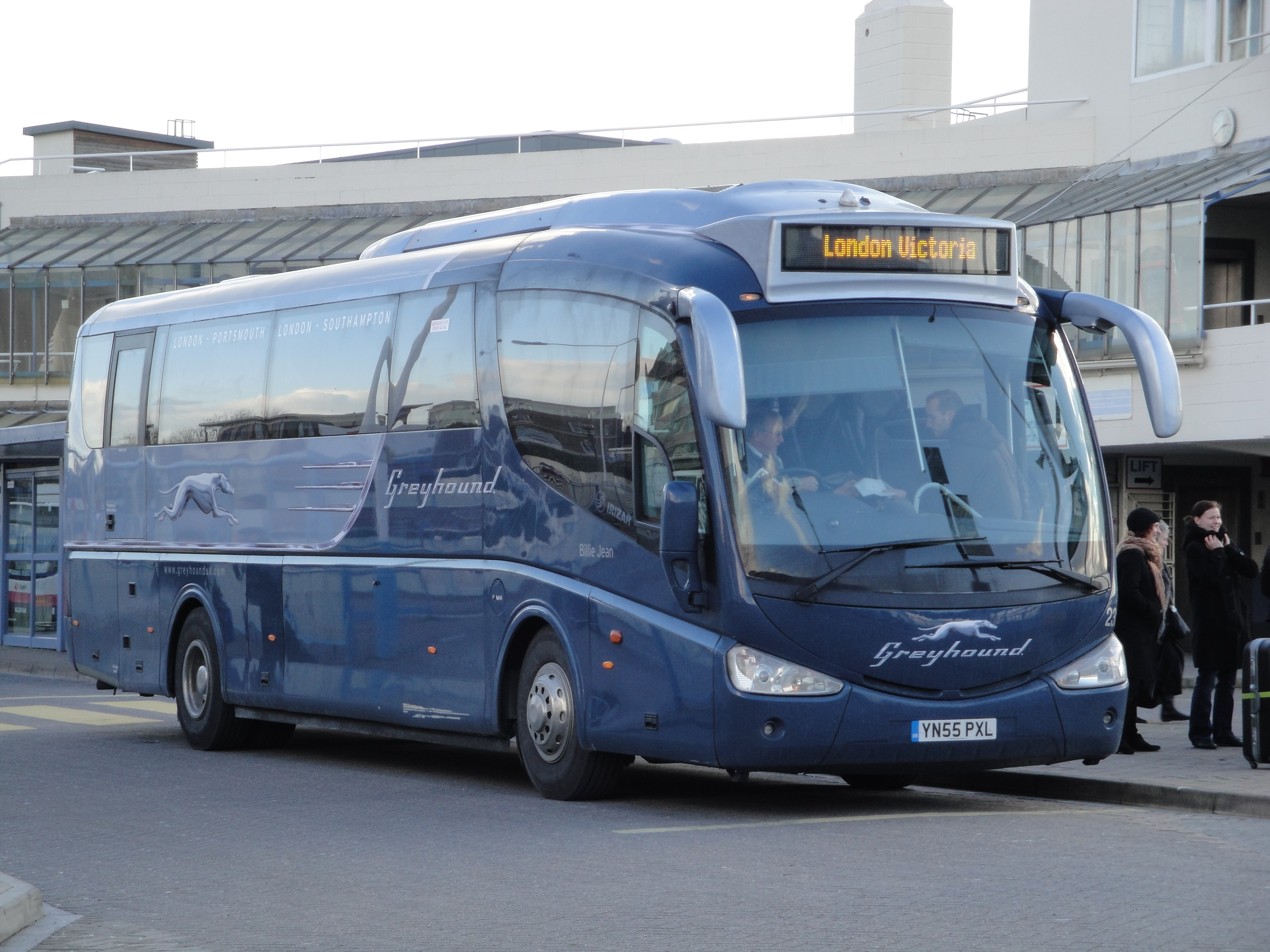
A Greyhound UK coach in Portsmouth shortly after the start of operations

Portsmouth is served by National Express, which operates a number of routes to the city and currently provides twelve journeys per day between London and Portsmouth, offering journey times of around two hours. A competing service between the two cities was introduced by Megabus, a division of the Stagecoach Group, in February 2004. Further competition on the corridor appeared in September 2009, when Portsmouth and Southampton became the first destinations to be served by Greyhound UK, owned by FirstGroup; this service ceased in November 2012.

Solent Blue Line operated a service linking Portsmouth to Southampton for four years from 2005. Prior to Blue Line's involvement, the route had been funded by both cities' council, but this did not continue. Latterly branded as the Solent Shuttle, the route was reduced in frequency in 2007 and finally withdrawn as loss-making in February 2009.

== Park and ride ==
Portsmouth is served by a park and ride service from a site at Tipner, close to the M275 motorway. The site opened in April 2014 at a cost of £28 million, providing 650 car parking spaces and including a new junction on the motorway and bus priority measures. The service was reported to have attracted over 7,000 passengers in the first week of operation.

A park and ride site at Tipner had earlier been proposed in 2007 as part of Portsmouth F.C.'s proposal to construct a new stadium. The site had previously been earmarked by the city council for a 2,000-space car park with a bus link to the city. The stadium project was later postponed.

Another park and ride bus service is operated in Portsmouth on Saturdays and some bank holidays. It runs from a site in North Harbour to the city centre and Portsmouth Harbour.

== List of current routes ==
This a list of current bus services that operate in Portsmouth and the surrounding suburbs (except coaches and school services).

Route	Start	End	Operator	Notes
1	Gunwharf Quays	South Parade Pier	First Hampshire & Dorset	
2	Gunwharf Quays	Paulsgrove	First Hampshire & Dorset	Operates as a 24-hour service.
3	South Parade Pier	Fareham bus station	First Hampshire & Dorset	
7	Portsmouth city centre	Wecock Farm	First Hampshire & Dorset	
8	Gunwharf Quays	Clanfield	First Hampshire & Dorset	
12	Fratton	Tipner	Stagecoach South	
13	Portsmouth city centre	Baffins	Stagecoach South	
14	Portsmouth city centre	Baffins	Stagecoach South	
18	Clarence Pier	Paulsgrove	Stagecoach South	
19	Portsmouth city centre	West Leigh	Stagecoach South	
20	Gunwharf Quays	Havant bus station	Stagecoach South	
21	Gunwharf Quays	Anchorage Park	Stagecoach South	
22	Cosham	Farlington	First Hampshire & Dorset	
23	South Parade Pier	Havant bus station	Stagecoach South	Operates as a 24-hour service.
25	Gunwharf Quays	Eastney	Stagecoach South	
700	Gunwharf Quays	Chichester bus station	Stagecoach South	
H1	Gunwharf Quays	Clarence Pier	First Hampshire & Dorset	Operates the Hoverbus service.
PR1	Tipner	Gunwharf Quays	First Hampshire & Dorset	Portsmouth Park and Ride service.
PR3	Tipner	Clarence Pier	First Hampshire & Dorset	Portsmouth Park and Ride service.
X3	South Parade Pier	Fareham bus station	First Hampshire & Dorset	
X4	Gunwharf Quays	Southampton Central station	First Hampshire & Dorset	
X5	Gunwharf Quays	Southampton Central station	First Hampshire & Dorset	

== Infrastructure ==
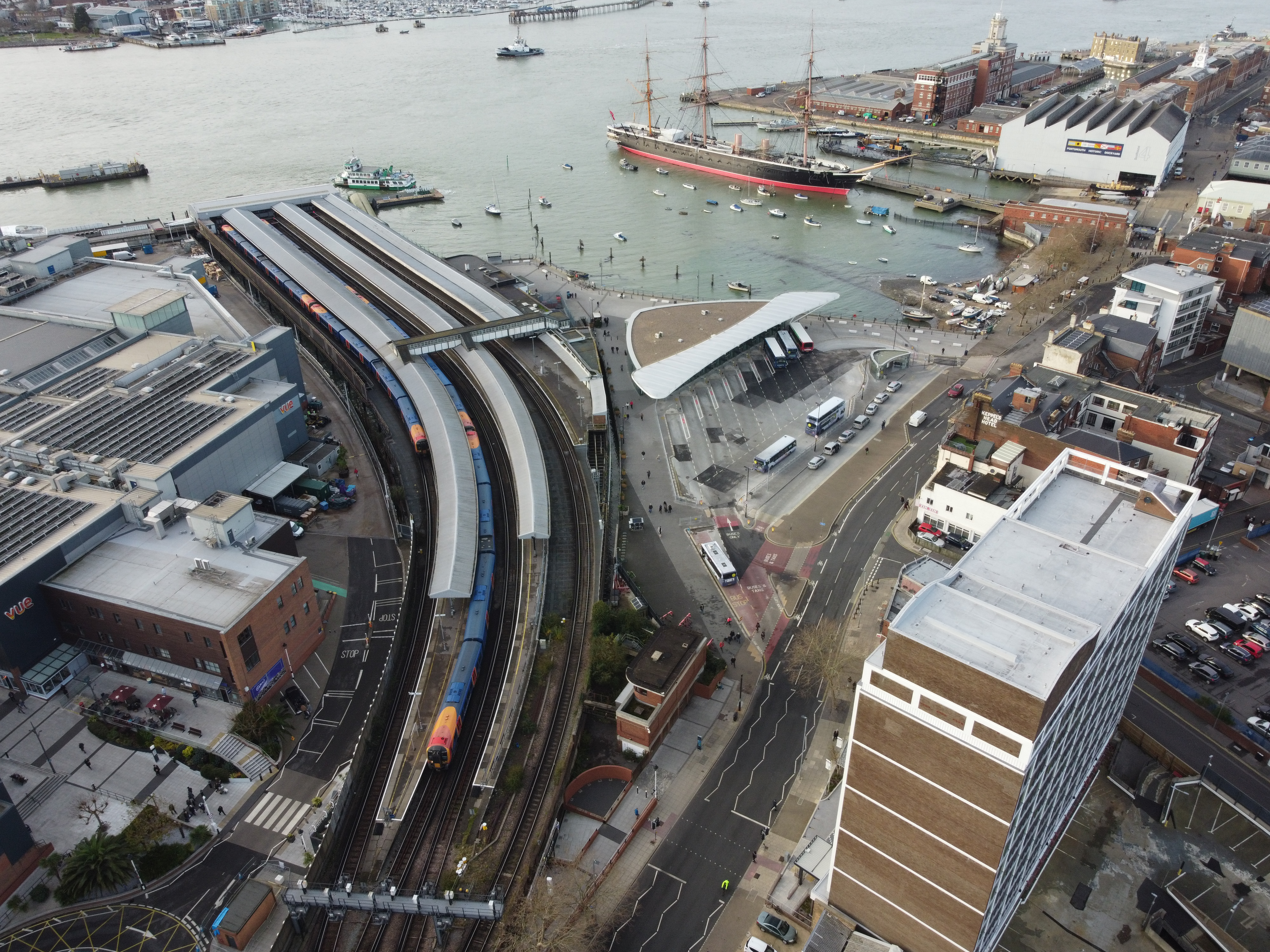
The Hard Interchange adjacent to Portsmouth Harbour railway station

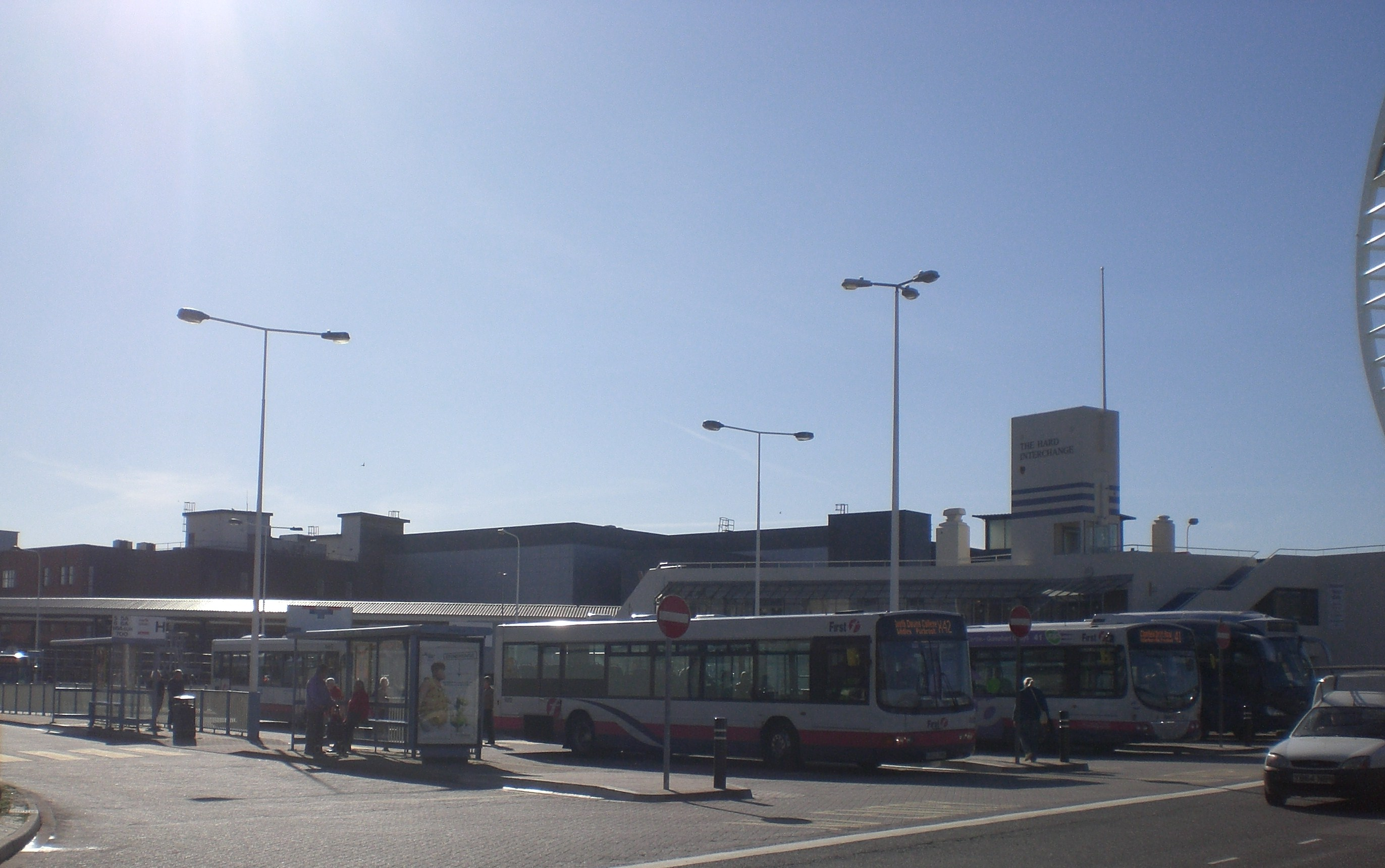
The former buildings at The Hard Interchange in November 2009

The Hard Interchange in June 2025

The Hard Interchange is the main bus station in Portsmouth, with connections to national rail as well as ferries to Gosport and Ryde. Portsmouth City Council stated its intention to improve the site in August 2008. Work commenced in autumn 2015, with some revision to roads in the vicinity together with temporary bus stop provision on The Hard itself. The work was completed in June 2017.

The city has several bus lanes, and two routes are the subject of quality bus partnership schemes between operators, the city council and Hampshire County Council. First Hampshire & Dorset's route 41, which used to run between Clanfield and Portsmouth and was marketed as Zip, was the subject of a quality bus partnership between First and three councils which utilises several features including bus priority measures. It has now been replaced by The Star service, running today as route 8.

== Dynamic real-time information ==
In 2004, the city became one of the first in the world to introduce real-time information to all of its bus stops and buses. The system was designed and developed by the city council and USA-based firm MeshNetworks.
