= Trolleybuses in Portsmouth =

Portsmouth trolleybus system
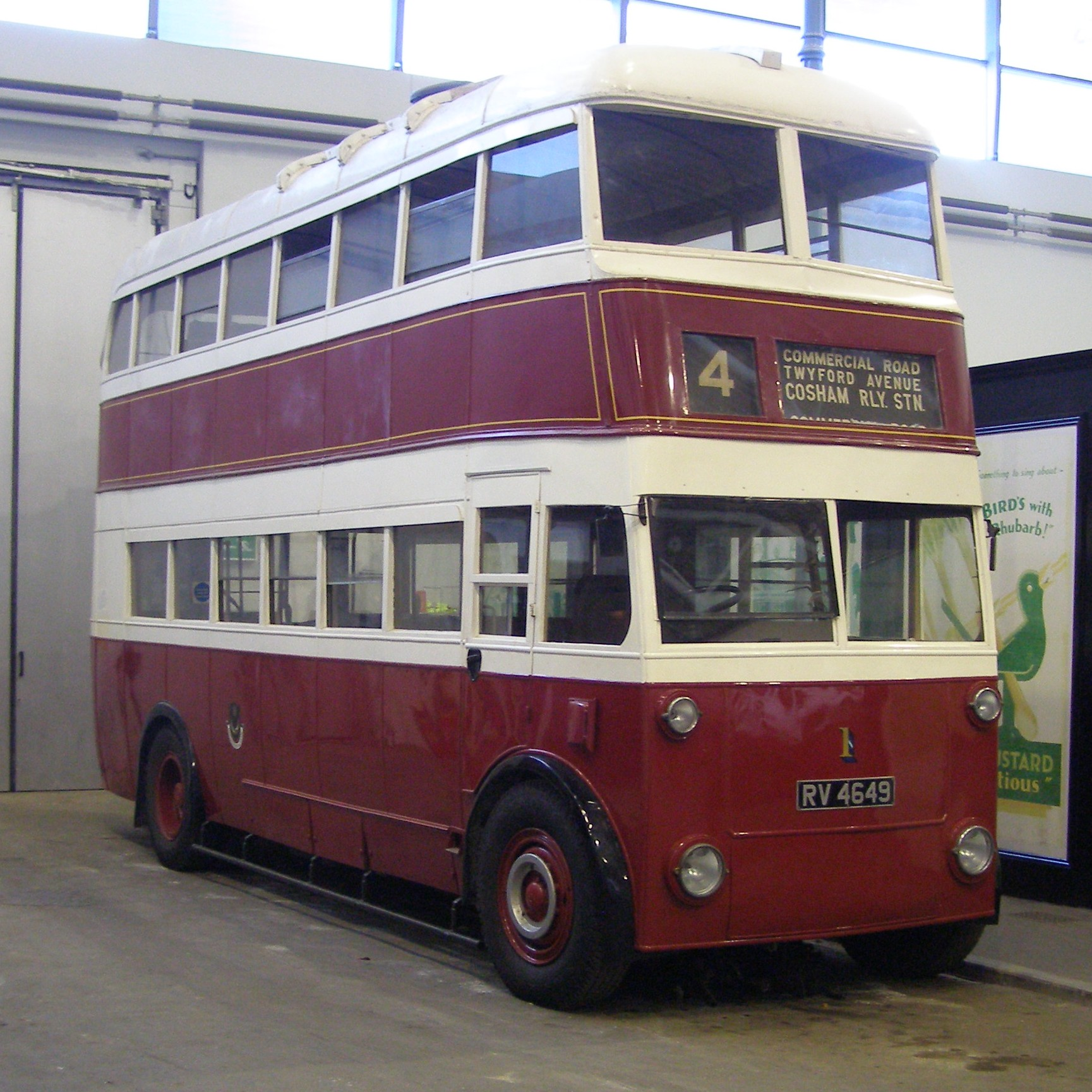
- Preserved Portsmouth trolleybus at the Milestones Museum, Basingstoke, Hampshire, 2006

Operation
- Locale: Portsmouth, Hampshire, England
- Open: 4 August 1934
- Close: 27 July 1963
- Status: Closed
- Routes: 9
- Operator: Portsmouth Corporation Transport

Infrastructure
- Electrification: (?) V DC parallel overhead lines
- Stock: 100 (maximum)

The Portsmouth trolleybus system once served the city of Portsmouth, Hampshire, England. Opened on 4 August 1934, it gradually replaced the Portsmouth tramway network; the last trams ran on 10 November 1936.

By the standards of the various now-defunct trolleybus systems in the United Kingdom, the Portsmouth system was a medium-sized one, with a total of nine routes, and a maximum fleet of 139 trolleybuses. It was closed on 27 July 1963. The former trolleybus routes were replaced by diesel bus services.

Two of the former Portsmouth trolleybuses are now preserved, one (No. 313) at the East Anglia Transport Museum at Carlton Colville, Suffolk, and the other one (No. 1) at the CPPTD Museum, Wicor Farm, and Portchester as of 2014.

== See also ==
- History of Portsmouth
- List of trolleybus systems in the United Kingdom
