= Lewes bus station =

Bus station in Lewes, England

Coordinates: 50.8747°N 0.01368°E

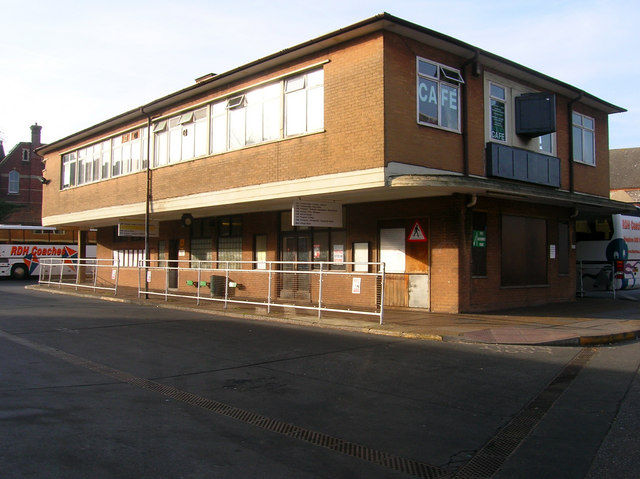
- Lewes bus station in February 2007

General information
- Location: Eastgate Street, Lewes; England
- Owner: Generator Group
- Bus operators: Brighton & Hove; Compass Bus

History
- Opened: 26 March 1954
- Closed: 16 September 2022
Location

Lewes bus station was a bus station in Lewes, England. It opened on 26 March 1954 as a terminus for Southdown Motor Services routes. The adjacent bus depot was opened several months earlier.

The bus station was sold by Stagecoach in 2006 and is currently owned by the Generator Group.

In August 2021, plans were submitted for the demolition of the bus station and redevelopment of the site.

The Twentieth Century Society submitted an application to Historic England to list the building however the Generator Group has also submitted a request for the building to not be listed. It closed on 16 September 2022, however as of August 2026 the site remains unaltered with only black construction walls marking the perimeter of the site. Services were redirected with Brighton and Newick bound services being moved to the expanded School Hill Bottom stop and Uckfield, Eastbourne, Heathfield, Tunbridge Wells and Lewes town services being moved to the opposite Lewes Waitrose stop.

Planning permission for the redevelopment was granted in April 2025.

== Design ==
The building had two storeys with the upper floor larger than the lower floor, creating an overhang which provides shelter.
