= Milestones Museum =

Museum in Basingstoke, Hampshire, UK

Milestones Living History Museum
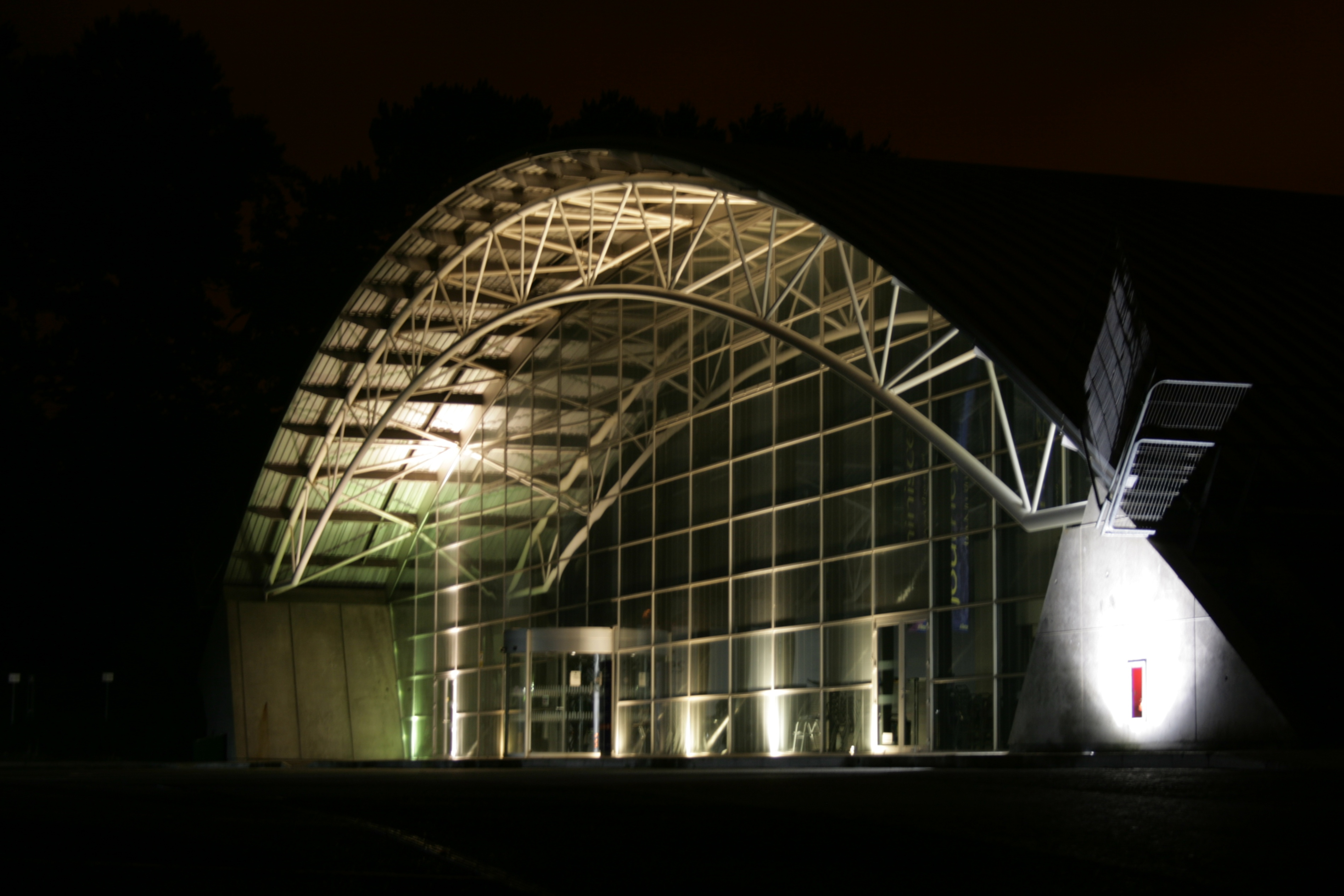
- Milestones Museum at night

- Location within Hampshire
- Established: 1 December 2000
- Location: Basingstoke, Hampshire, England
- Coordinates: 51°15′59″N 1°06′41″W
- Type: Heritage centre
- Visitors: 102,505
- Public transit access: Route 8 bus
- Website: Milestones

Milestones Museum of Living History is a museum located on the Leisure Park in Basingstoke, Hampshire, UK. Milestones is made up of a network of streets that have been recreated according to those found in Victorian and 1930s Hampshire.

It was opened on 1 December 2000 by Duke of Edinburgh as a joint project between Hampshire County Council and Basingstoke and Deane Borough Council, supported by the Heritage Lottery Fund.

In 2025, the museum had 102,505 visitors.

In 2014, ownership of the Milestones Museum was transferred to the Hampshire Cultural Trust as part of a larger transfer of museums from Hampshire County Council and Winchester City Council.

== Exhibits ==
=== Buildings ===
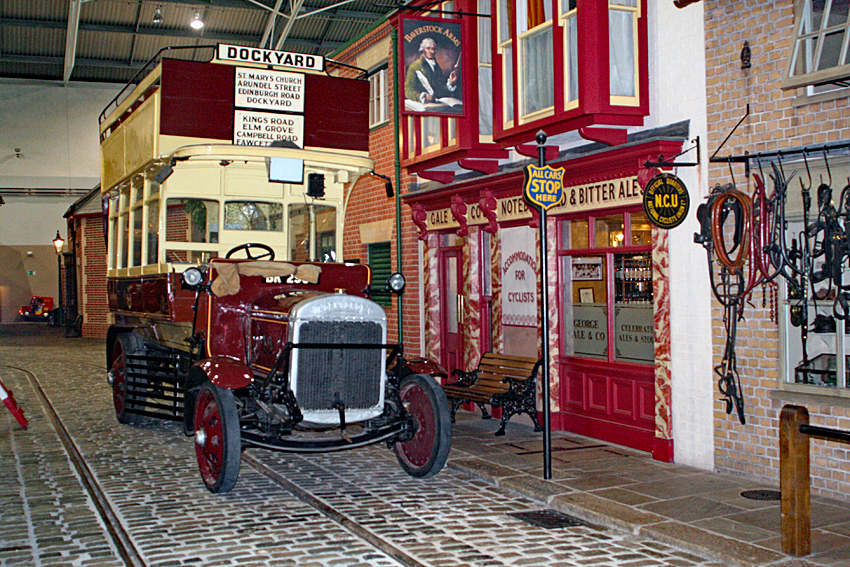
Thornycroft J bus outside the Baverstock Arms

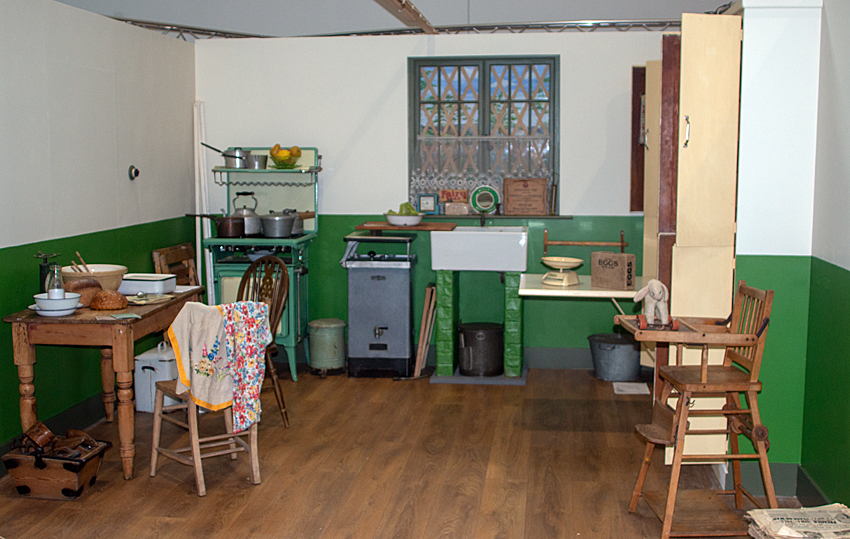
1940's kitchen

Features include recreations of:

- a Victorian public house, the Baverstock Arms, named for a 19th-century Alton brewer. Serves alcoholic refreshments at lunchtime.
- a Victorian railway station based on the GWR station at Winchester (Chesil). Features a 4mm scale model of the station with operating trains.
- a Victorian Ironmonger
- a Victorian watchmaker and jeweller
- a Victorian terraced house
- a Victorian milliners
- a Victorian light engineering shop
- a Victorian paintworks, powered by a Tasker stationary steam engine
- a Victorian pier amusement arcade
- a sawmill
- a saddlery
- a 1930s town with shops
  - Cooperative Society shop
  - sweet shop
  - toy shop (with original toys)
  - record and television shop (including original equipment)
  - Car showroom
- 1940s period home interiors, kitchen and living room.

A new addition for 2021 is Mr Simpson's Teddy Bear museum, featuring more than 260 examples dating from 1905 onwards.

Many of the shops and workshops feature sound tracks of appropriate conversations and sound effects.

=== Road vehicles ===
There is a large collection of road vehicles, notably by local manufacturers, Thornycroft of Basingstoke and Taskers of Andover. These cover examples of human powered, horse drawn, steam and motor driven vehicles.

==== Human powered ====
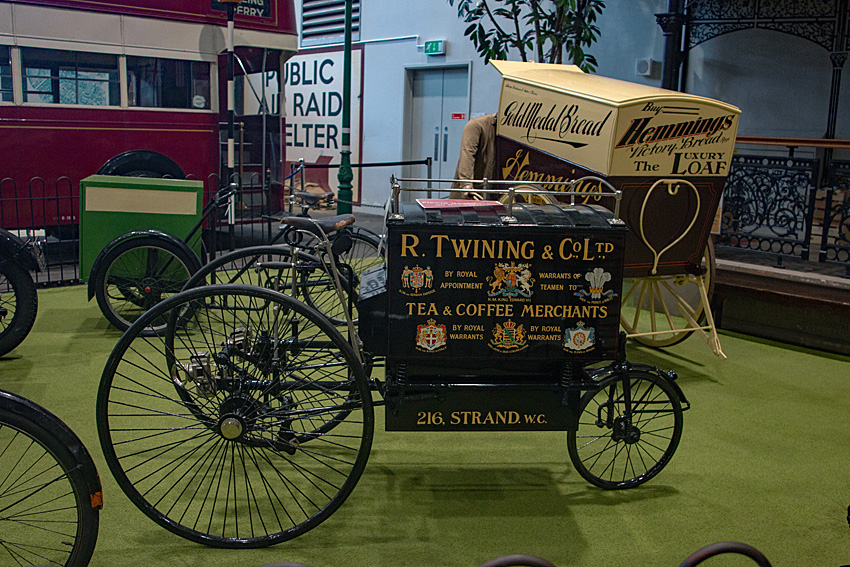
Twining's reversed tricycle

- Hand cart
- Hand propelled bakers cart.
- Grocer's delivery bicycle
- 2 tradesmens' tricycles
- Various bicycles, including penny-farthings

==== Horse drawn vehicles ====
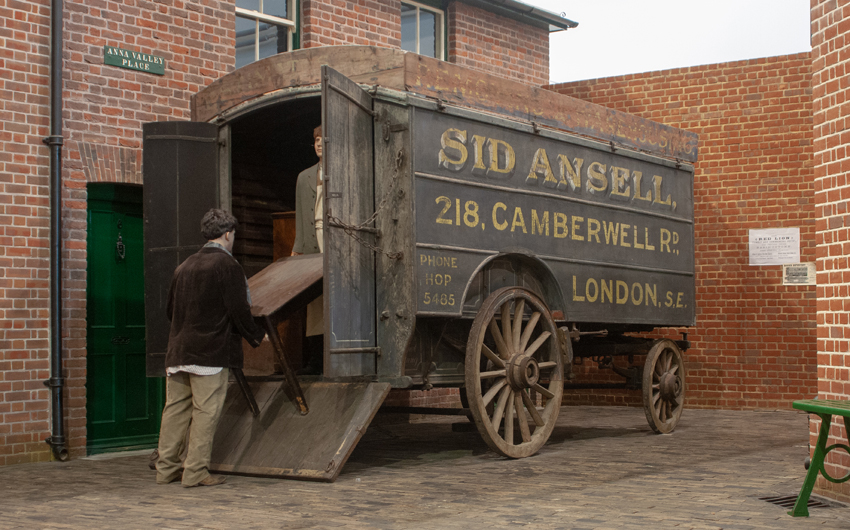
Horse drawn pantechnicon

- Pantechnicon
- Governess cart
- Brewers dray
- Coalman's cart
- Milk float
- Farm wagon
- Stickback undercut gig
- Hutchings caravan
- Reading type Romany caravan or vardo
- Portable steam engine

==== Steam vehicles ====
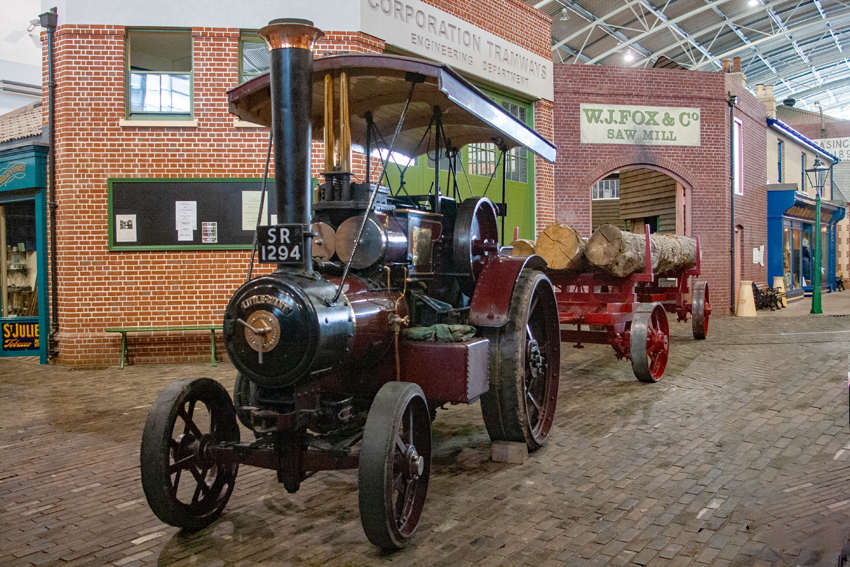
Little Giant traction engine

Include two road rollers by Taskers and two by Wallis & Steevens. There are also two Taskers Little Giant traction engines, one displayed with a log trailer.

- EL 3908 Thornycroft Steam Wagon, works number 115, built in 1902.
- AA 5296 Taskers Little Giant, works number 1599, built in 1914.
- SR 1294 Taskers Little Giant, works number 1726, built in 1917.
- BD 7994 Taskers road roller, works number 1906, built in 1923.
- YB 183 Taskers Little Giant steam lorry, works number 1915, built in 1924. The only surviving Taskers steam lorry.
- OT 8201 Taskers road roller, works number 1933, built in 1928.
- AA 2470 Wallis & Steevens steam wagon, works number 7279.
- OT 3078 Wallis & Steevens Advance road roller, works number 7867 built in 1926.
- OT 8512 Wallis & Steevens Simplicity road roller, works number 7940, built in 1928.

==== Motor vehicles ====
There are some 25 commercial vehicles along with private cars, two generations of motor buses and a coach.

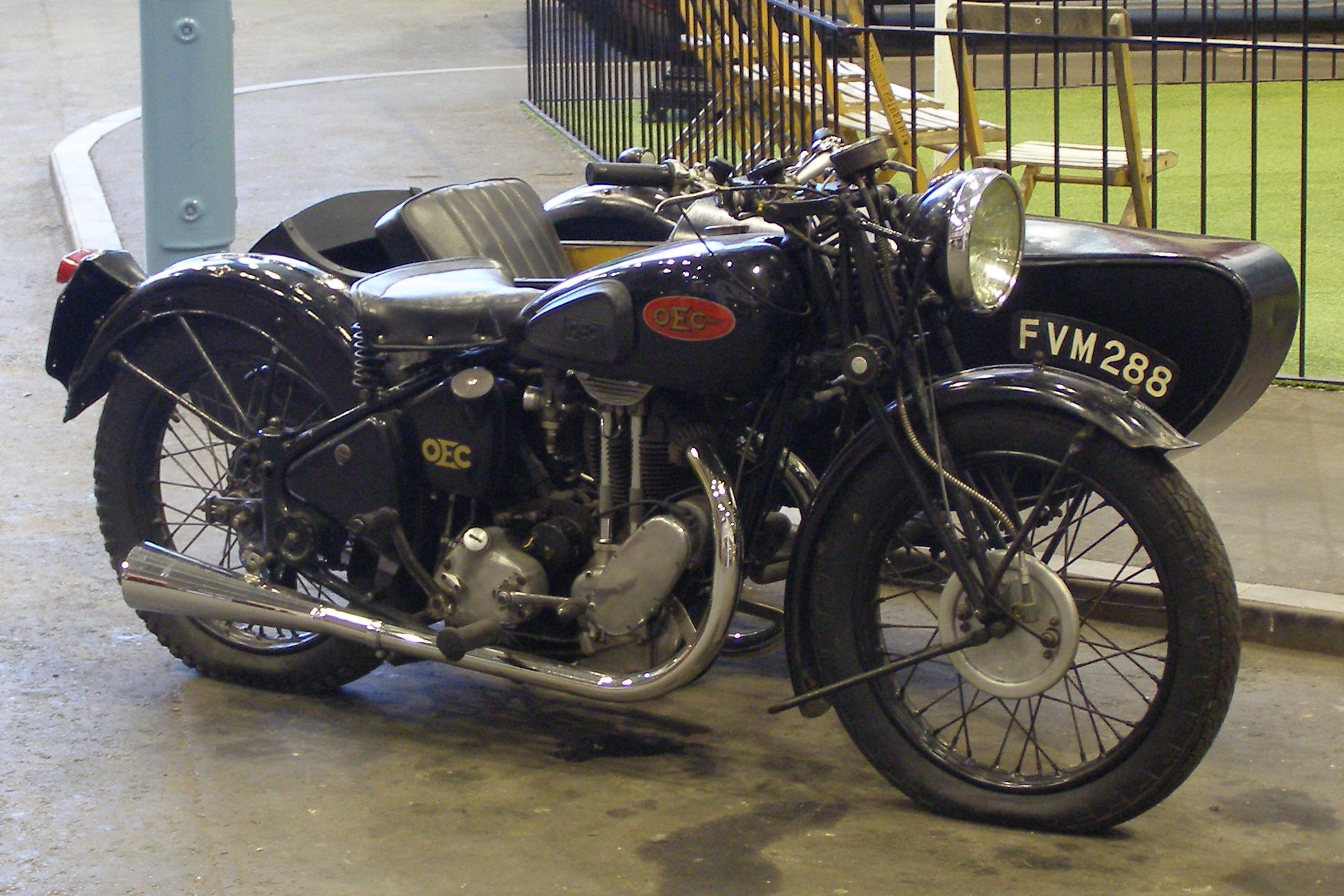
OEC motorbike and sidecar

- Cars
  - BS 8239 Thornycroft 4 seater, built in 1903.
  - H 2499 Thornycroft 14HP open tourer, built in 1905.
  - DS 6683 Thornycroft open tourer, built in 1907.
  - DS 6684 Thornycroft 30HP open tourer, built in 1907.
  - AMO 903 Morris convertible, built in 1937.
  - FVM 288 OEC motorbike and sidecar, built in 1939.
  - K 3 Keeble K3 concept car, built in 2003.
- Buses
  - BK 2986 Thornycroft J Portsmouth Corporation No. 10, built 1919.
  - RV 6368 Leyland Titan TD4, Portsmouth Corporation No. 8, built 1934.
  - EY 5218 Thornycroft Lightning coach. Built in 1935 and displayed in half-built condition.

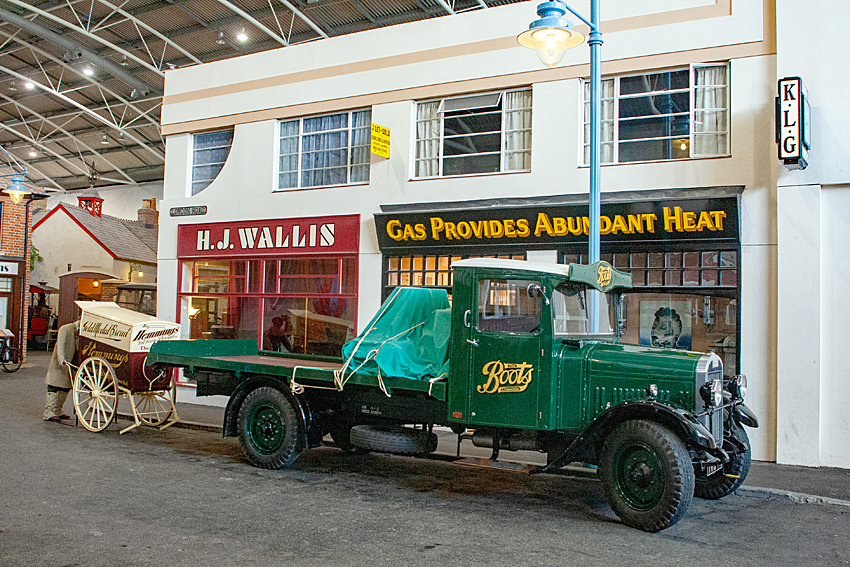
1931 Thornycroft Bulldog lorry

- Commercial vehicles include:
  - NB 6684 Thornycroft J army lorry, WD livery, built in 1916.
  - SV 6068 Thornycroft J lorry, SCATS livery, built in 1917.
  - CJ 3008 Thornycroft X type lorry, D.C. Bowkley livery, built in 1918.
  - CE 6065 Leyland military subsidy lorry, Chivers & Sons livery, built in 1919
  - BS 9028 Thornycroft A1 lorry, Shell livery, built in 1925.
  - YN 402 Austin pick-up, Gales Brewery livery, built in 1926.
  - OU 6028 Thornycroft A2/FB4 horsebox, built in 1930
  - TV 5530 Thornycroft Bulldog flatbed lorry, Boots livery, built in 1931.
  - AAA 469 Thornycroft Handy dropside lorry, Corrals livery, built in 1934.
  - AUO 601 Morris van, Beavis and Co livery, built in 1935.
  - BWD 461 Thornycroft Sturdy milk lorry, PIMCO livery, built in 1937.
  - VYJ 521 Thornycroft Amazon Coles RAF recovery crane, built in 1942
  - DFK 98 Thornycroft Nippy flatbed lorry, Thornycroft livery, built in 1949.
  - MKX 788 Thornycroft Sturdy road sweeper, built in 1949.
  - POR 602 Wallis & Steevens Advance diesel road roller
  - YMY 432H Thornycroft Nubian airport crash tender, MOD, built in 1971.

==== Fire Brigade ====
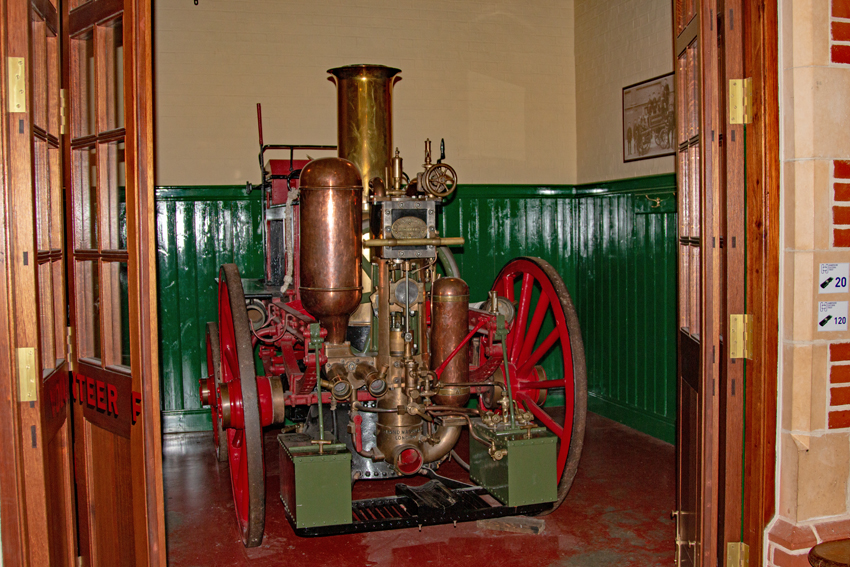
Shand Mason horse drawn steam pump

The Museum fire station has a selection of hand-propelled, horse-drawn and motorised fire engines.

- Hand operated and propelled pump.
- Hand propelled Pyrene fire extinguisher.
- Shand Mason horse-drawn fire engine.
- Shand Mason horse-drawn steam pump
- BOR 316 Dennis Light 6 fire engine, Hampshire Fire Service, built in 1936.
- HJP 382 Dennis Big 4 fire engine, Hampshire Fire Brigade, built in 1938

=== Railway and tramway stock ===
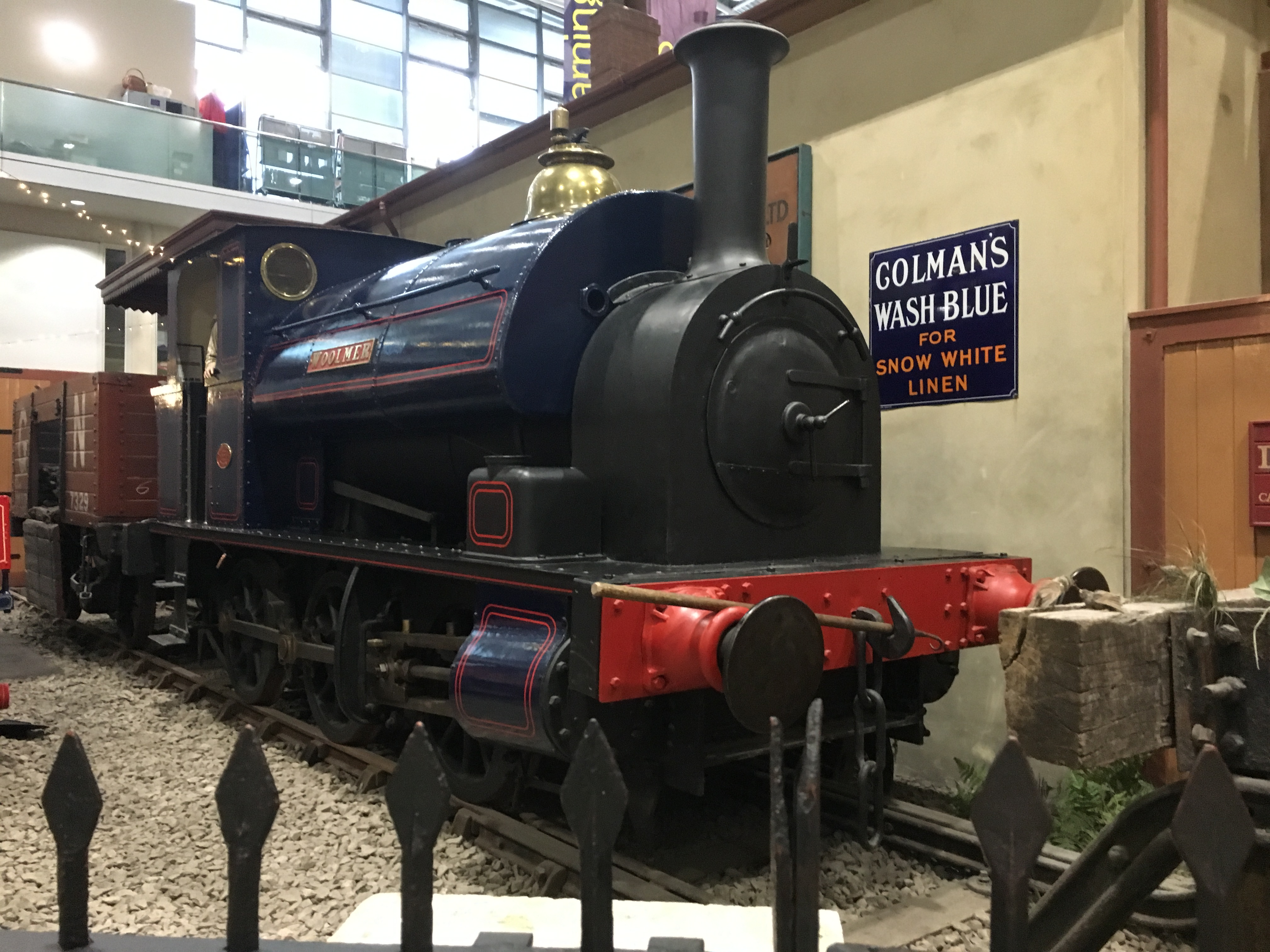
Avonside 1572 0-6-0ST "Woolmer"

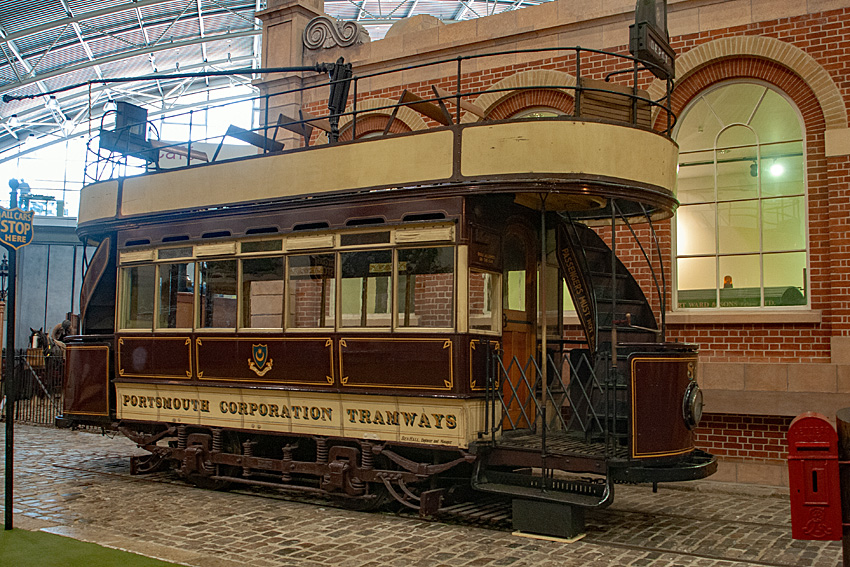
Portsmouth tram No 84

- Longmoor Military Railway 0-6-0ST No. 1572 "Woolmer" built by the Avonside Engine Company in 1910. On loan from the National Collection.
- Great Northern Railway 7-plank open wagon No. 7329
- Portsmouth electric tramcar No. 84

=== Temporary exhibitions ===
Between February and April 2014 the museum hosted an exhibition of Lego models of extinct animals, constructed by Bright Bricks. In 2018, the exhibition returned, focusing on mythical creatures.

A Victorian themed Christmas Market is held in early December.
