= Coastliner 700 =

Bus route in England

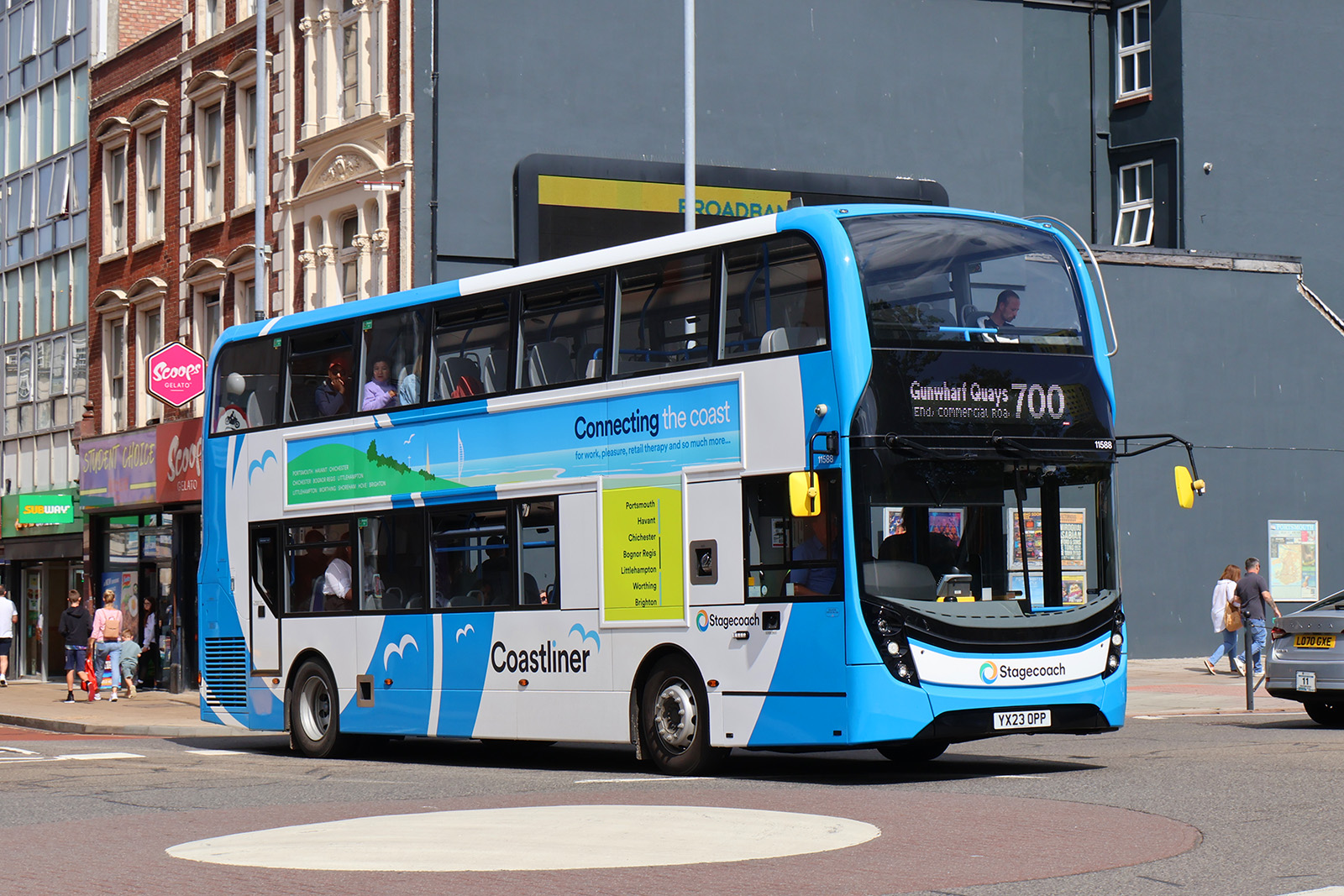
- Alexander Dennis Enviro400 MMC in the current Coastliner livery in Portsmouth in August 2023

Overview
- Operator: Stagecoach South
- Vehicle: Alexander Dennis Enviro400 MMC; Alexander Dennis Enviro400 (formerly); Alexander Dennis Enviro300 (formerly); Alexander ALX400 (formerly)
- Peak vehicle requirement: 51
- Predecessors: Route 31
- Night-time: Route N700

Route
- Start: Brighton
- Via: Hove, Shoreham-by-Sea, Worthing, Durrington, Goring-by-Sea, Littlehampton, Wick, Bognor Regis, Chichester, Havant, Portsmouth
- End: Portsmouth
- Length: 56.8 miles (91.4 km)

Service
- Level: Daily
- Frequency: 12 minutes (Mondays-Saturdays); 15 minutes (Sundays)
- Journey time: 4 hours 20 minutes

Coastliner 700 is a bus service operated in West Sussex and south east Hampshire, England, by Stagecoach South between Brighton and Portsmouth via Hove, Shoreham-by-Sea, Worthing, Durrington, Littlehampton, Wick, Bognor Regis, Chichester, Havant, and Portsmouth with a daytime frequency of every 12 minutes on Mondays to Saturdays; the service runs every 15 minutes on Sundays. The route has its own livery and is usually operated with double-decker buses.

== History ==
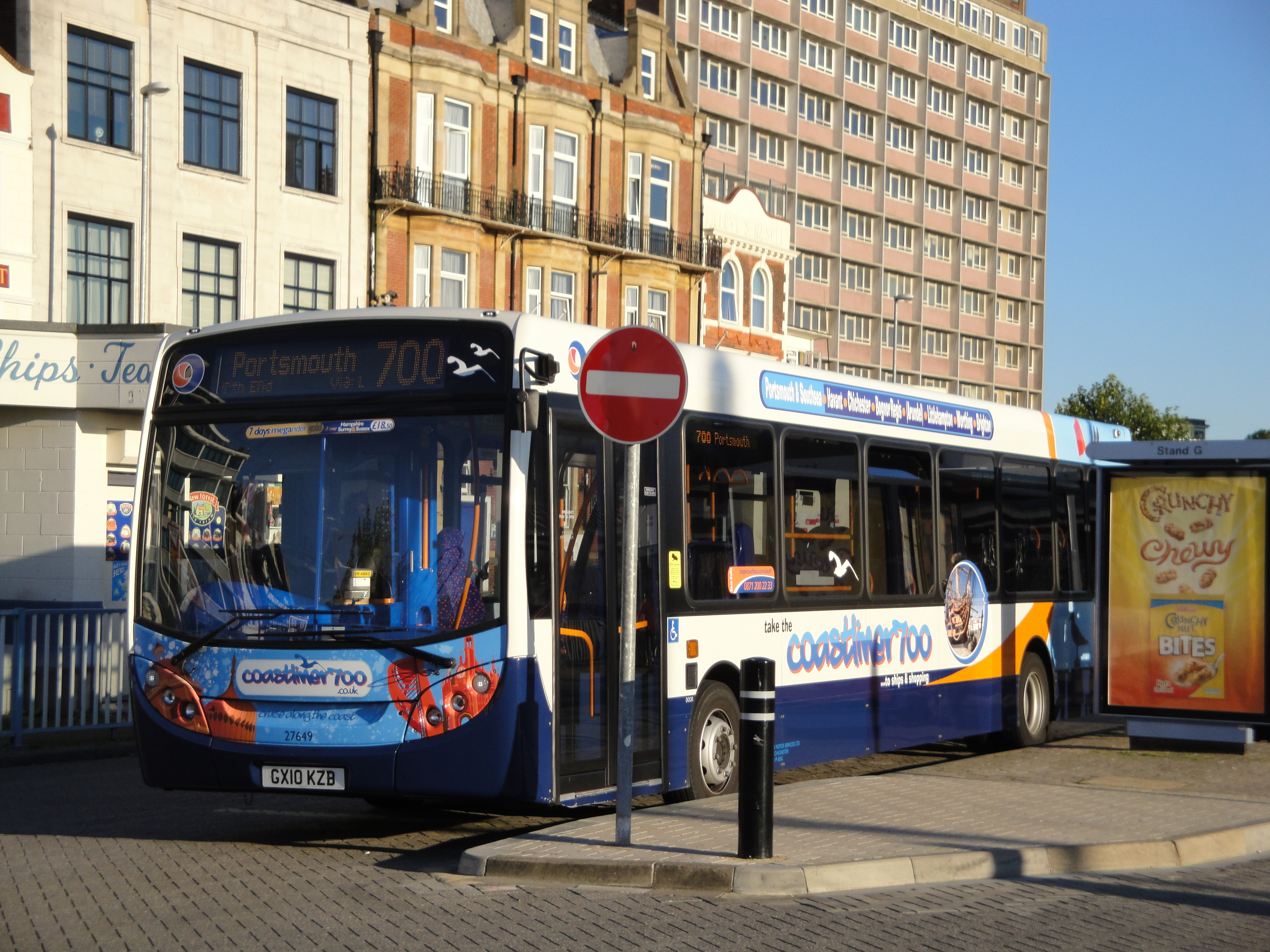
Coastliner 700 liveried Alexander Dennis Enviro300 at The Hard Interchange, Portsmouth in October 2010 showing the Coastliner 2010–2015?) logo

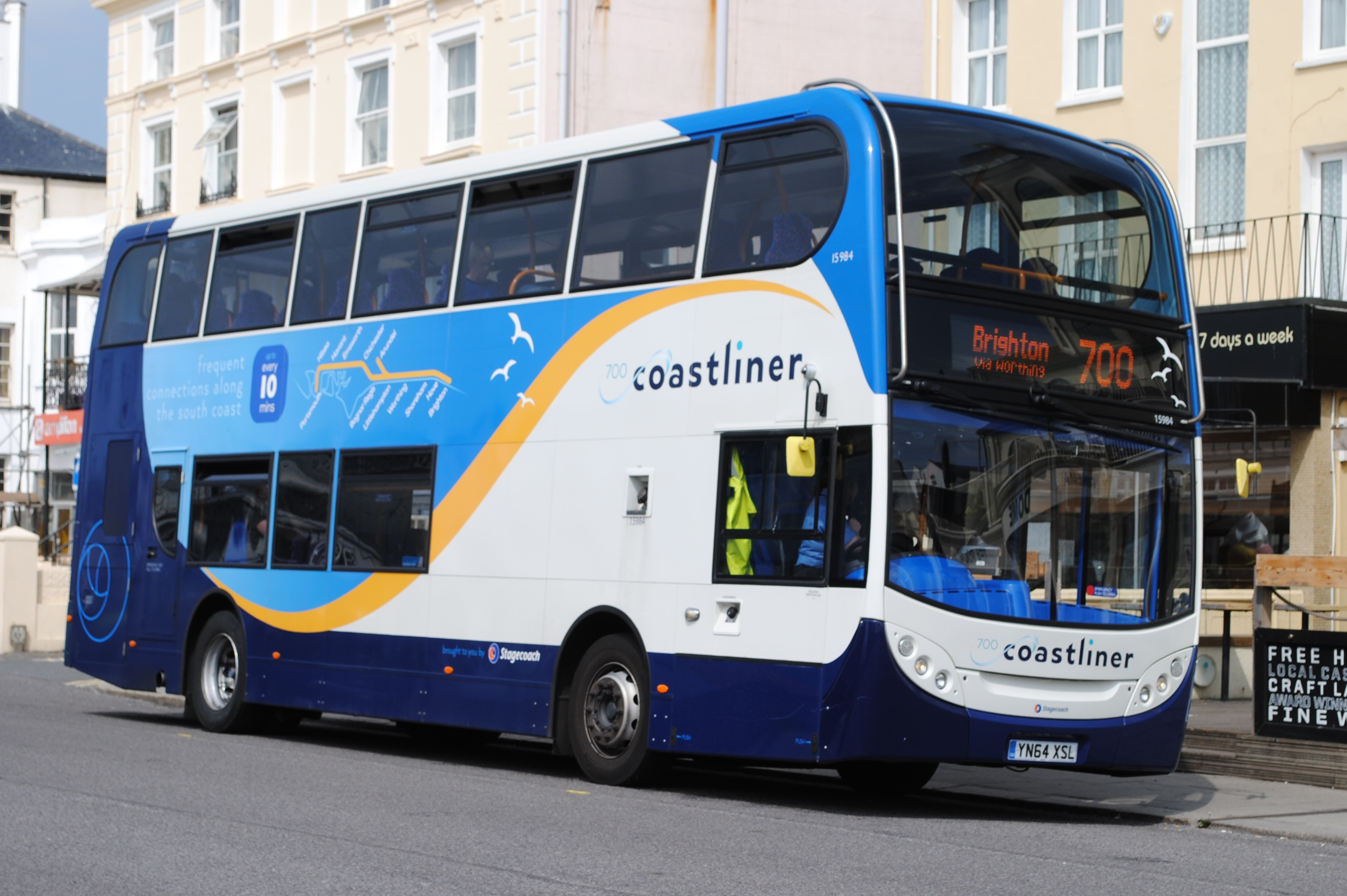
Alexander Dennis Enviro400 bodied Scania N230UD in Worthing in May 2016 showing the 2014-2021 Coastliner logo

The route was introduced in 1975, as the 'Stagecoach 700' operated by Southdown Motor Services, a subsidiary of the state-owned National Bus Company (NBC). A similar route numbered 31 had existed since the 1920s, but was broken up into shorter routes in the early 1970s to improve reliability; the 700 initially ran as a limited stop service to avoid the same reliability issues. It was operated by ECW bodied Bristol VRs and Charles H Roe / Park Royal bodied Leyland Atlanteans. Southdown became an independent operator following the privatisation of NBC in 1986, and was taken over by the Stagecoach Group in 1989.

In 2006 the route, by now operated by the Stagecoach South division, was upgraded as part of a partnership between Stagecoach and several local authorities led by West Sussex County Council. The partnership, initially marketed as "coastal fastway", included the introduction of new vehicles and electronic passenger information systems with the aim of increasing passenger numbers by 50% in five years. The upgrade provoked some criticism from Derek Deedman, county councillor for the Bramber Castle area, for failing to include benefits to other services linking the coast to towns such as Steyning.

Further upgrades, initially centred on Shoreham-by-Sea before being extended to the section of route between Worthing and Brighton, were announced in 2009, including bus priority measures at busy road junctions. By 2010 the service carried four million people per year; in 2012, this figure was 4.9 million. Stagecoach introduced new vehicles in March 2010.

The service has had its own livery from the beginning. It began with a coloured strip along the side of the green Southdown bus; now it is the regular Stagecoach livery, blue, white, orange and red, with the route description on the side, with individual buses having livery related to a certain town along the route, and slogans such as 'We took the Coastliner 700 to fun and fashion'.

Since May 4th 2014, the Coastliner has been split into three services. One route runs between Brighton and Littlehampton, with the services extending to Wickbourne, just North of Littlehampton, another between Littlehampton and Chichester and a third between Bognor Regis Chichester and Portsmouth. Other changes made at the same time included a higher frequency of service between Chichester and Portsmouth and between Littlehampton and Arundel, and the introduction of later evening journeys.

- 700: Brighton - Worthing - Littlehampton/Arundel
- 700: Littlehampton - Bognor Regis - Chichester
- 700: Bognor Regis - Chichester - Havant - Portsmouth

Since April 2017, the Coastliner service no longer serves the tourist town of Arundel. Instead, the town is now served by an hourly service Number 9 from Arundel to Littlehampton, Shoreham-by-Sea, and Holmbush Shopping Centre. This connects with the Coastliner at Littlehampton.

- 9: Arundel - Littlehampton - Angmering - Worthing - Shoreham-by-Sea - Holmbush Centre
- 700: Brighton - Worthing - Littlehampton - Wick
- 700: Littlehampton - Bognor Regis - Chichester
- 700: Bognor Regis - Chichester - Havant - Portsmouth

At the end of May 2021, Stagecoach applied their new yellow and gold 'long distance' brand to Coastliner buses and their associated publicity.

Since 2023, all Coastliner services from Portsmouth terminate at Chichester and connect with separate Coastliner services between Chichester, Bognor Regis, Yapton and Littlehampton. The service is now operated with buses in a light blue livery based on Stagecoach's 'local' livery instead of yellow and gold 'long distance'.

Since 6th April 2025, the service has been split further, with the 3 routes becoming 4 routes:

- 700: Brighton - Worthing - Durrington
- 701: Lancing - Worthing - Littlehampton - Wick
- 700: Littlehampton or Yapton - Bognor Regis - Chichester
- 700: Chichester - Havant - Portsmouth

The Coastliner service no longer serves the villages of Ferring and East Preston. These villages are instead served by a half hourly service 11 from Worthing to Littlehampton via Goring-by-Sea, Ferring, East Preston and Rustington. This connects with the Coastliner at Littlehampton.

== Vehicles ==
The route is operated with a peak vehicle requirement of 51 buses from three Stagecoach depots in Worthing, Chichester and Portsmouth. Since 2023, the route is operated using branded Alexander Dennis Enviro400 MMCs, 30 of which were delivered in 2018 to run on the service between Littlehampton and Brighton due to Brighton's low-emission zone, and 22 more featuring a revised Coastliner livery scheme being delivered in June 2023.

Previously, the route was operated by Dennis Trident 2, Alexander Dennis Enviro400 (Note: Some of these vehicles were built on the Scania N230UD chassis, whilst others were built on the Alexander Dennis Enviro40D chassis.) and Alexander Dennis Enviro300 vehicles delivered between 2006 and 2014.

== See also ==
- The Wave, another South Coast route running from Dover to Eastbourne
