= Portsmouth Corporation Transport =

Former transit company based in Portsmouth, England

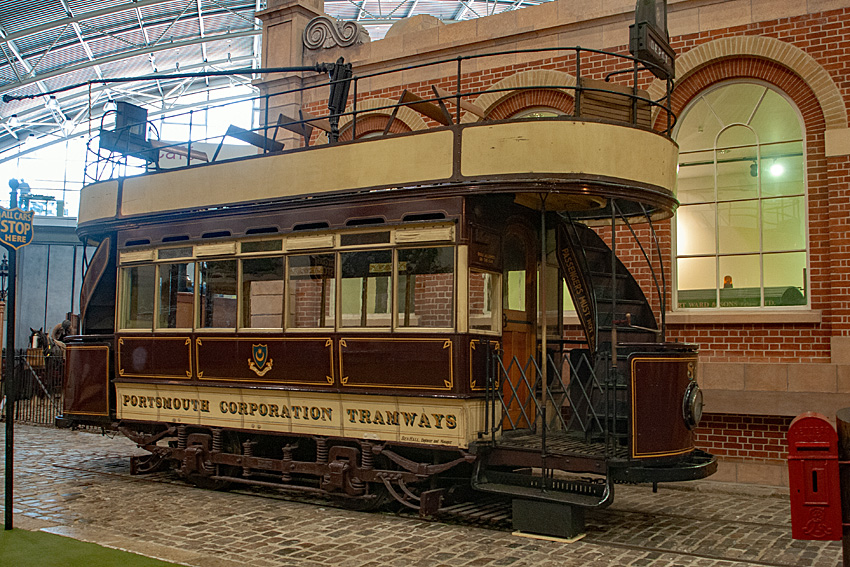
- Portsmouth Corporation Transport tram No. 84 at Milestones Museum in Basingstoke

Overview
- Headquarters: Portsmouth
- Locale: England
- Dates of operation: 24 September 1901–10 November 1936 (trams) 1988

Technical
- Track gauge: 4 ft 7 3/4 in (1,416 mm)
- Length: 15.75 miles (25.35 km) (1927)

Portsmouth Corporation Transport was a tram, trolleybus and bus operator formed in 1898, serving the city of Portsmouth, and owned by Portsmouth Corporation. Tram services ended in 1936, trolleybus services in 1963, while bus operations continued until the company was privatised in 1988.

== History ==
Corporation of Portsmouth Passenger Transport Department (CPPTD), otherwise known as Portsmouth Corporation Transport, was formed by the Portsmouth Corporation Tramways Act 1898 (61 & 62 Vict. c. ccxxix), allowing Portsmouth Corporation to take over the existing horse-drawn tramways.

The right to purchase the existing tramways was exercised in January 1901 and the system closed whilst it was converted to electric traction, being completed in September 1901. However, horse traction did not end completely and continued on the Hilsea to Cosham line until May 1903. The compulsory purchase of all of the lines of the Portsmouth Street Tramways Company within the borough, left the company with a short stub line from the boundary at Hilsea to Cosham. The parent company, the Provincial Tramways Company, extended the line to Waterlooville and reopened as the Portsdown and Horndean Light Railway on 2 March 1902. Through working later took place, until Southdown purchased the company in 1935, then shut the line down.

Trolleybuses replaced trams for the first time on the South Parade Pier to Cosham route on 4 August 1934 followed quickly by replacement of trams with trolleybuses on the other routes. The last tram was No. 106 and ran on 10 November 1936. Portsmouth Corporation Transport continued to operate the trolleybuses officially until 27 July 1963 (although it did operate trolleybuses on late evening services 17/18 and 19/20 for a few weeks afterwards), after which it continued purely as a bus operator, until 1988, when it was privatised.

== Preservation and survivals ==
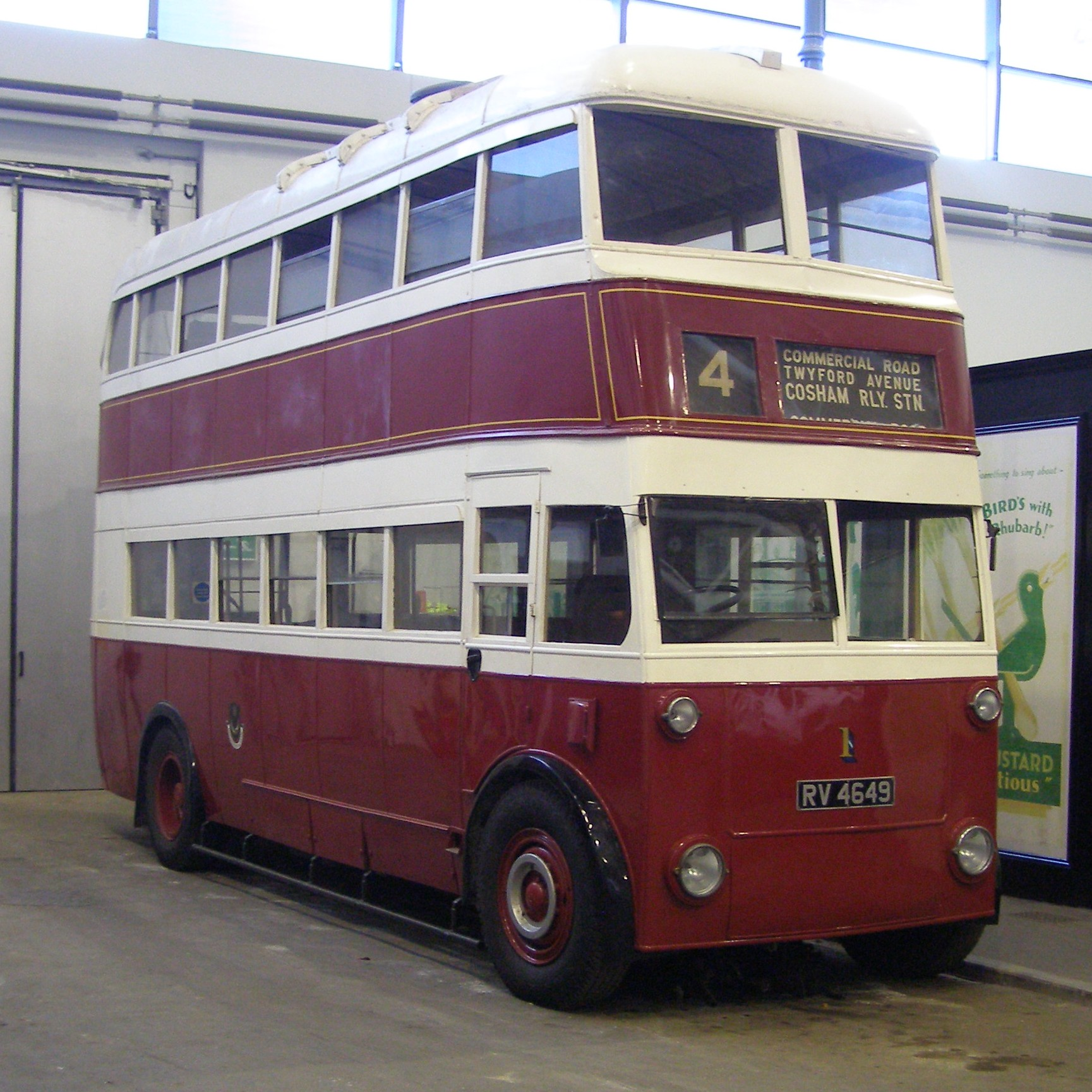
A 1934-built AEC661T Trolleybus

For many years, vehicles of Portsmouth Corporation Transport were preserved at the City of Portsmouth Preserved Transport Depot (CPPTD), based at the Broad Street bus depot in Portsmouth. Zoned for redevelopment, this site closed in 2003. Many vehicles were dispersed, but the CPPTD found a new home at Wicor Farm in Portchester and some of the vehicles have been returned. Unfortunately access to the new location is only by appointment, although there are some open days, but some members of the collection have been used for free trips along Southsea seafront in the summer, since 2008.

The body of a Portsdown and Horndean Light Railway tram survives at the Old Kiln Light Railway where it has been incorporated into a station building.

Some surviving track can still be seen in the cobbled road surface of Broad Street, Old Portsmouth, 50.792268°N 1.108746°W, and in Rugby Road, South of Fratton Station, 50.794157°N 1.077007°W.
