= Southdown Motor Services =

Bus operator in Sussex and Hampshire, England

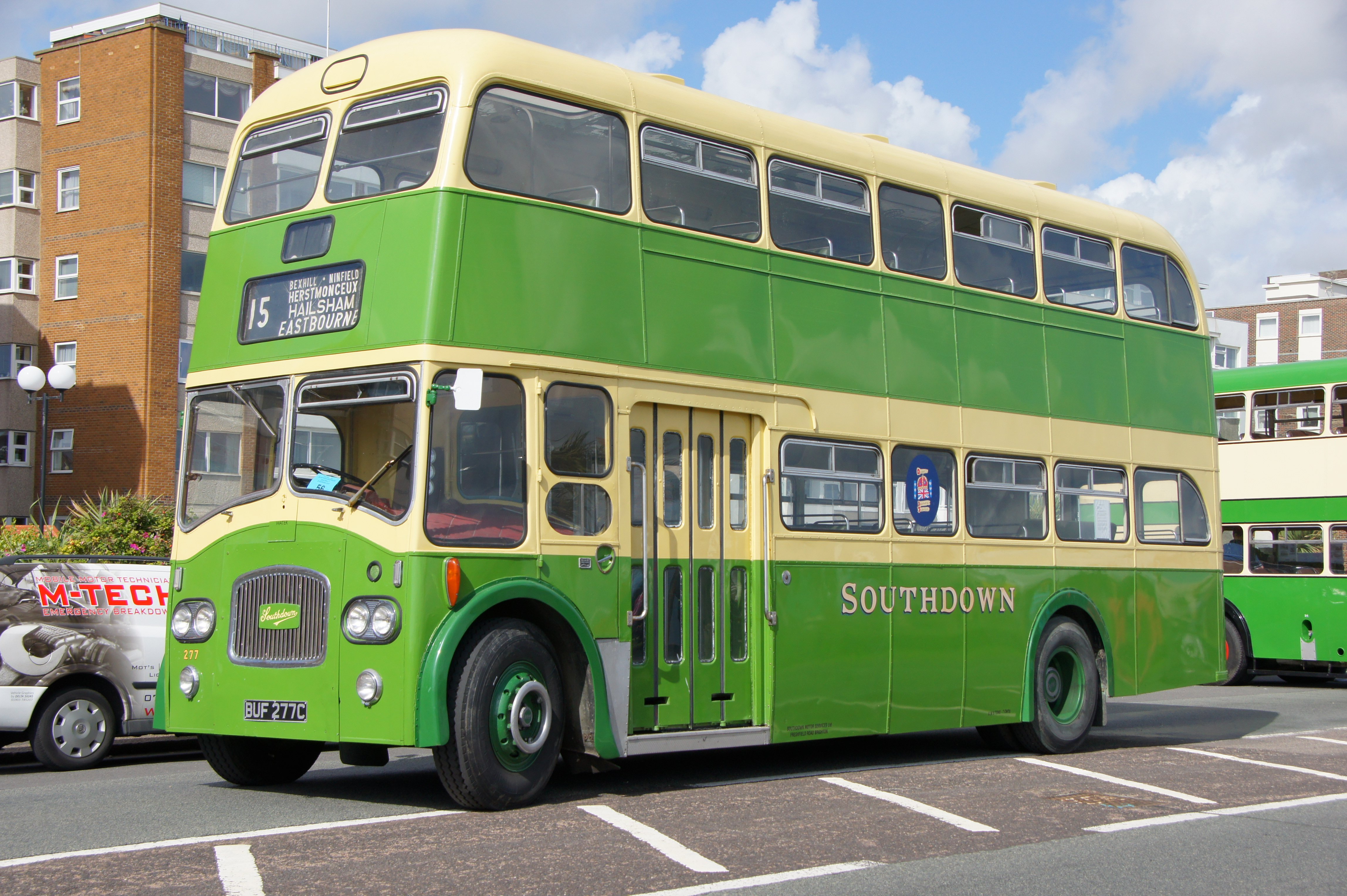
- Preserved Northern Counties 'Queen Mary' Leyland Titan PD3 at the 2012 Worthing bus rally
- Parent: National Bus Company (1969–1989); Stagecoach Group (1989–2015)
- Founded: January 1915; 111 years ago
- Defunct: 2015; 11 years ago
- Headquarters: Brighton, East Sussex, England
- Service area: Sussex; Parts of Hampshire
- Service type: Bus and coach
- Alliance: Maidstone & District Motor Services; Hants & Dorset Motor Services

Southdown Motor Services (until 1992 legally Southdown Motors Services Ltd) was a bus and coach operator in East and West Sussex and parts of Hampshire in southern England. It was formed in 1915 and had various owners throughout its history, being purchased by the National Bus Company (NBC) in 1969.

The Southdown fleet name was lost when the company was acquired by the Stagecoach Group in 1989, but buses operated under the Southdown Motors Services Ltd operating license until 2015, when the licence was transferred to another company within the group. Southdown became a dormant company but was still owned by Stagecoach until the company was dissolved by the group in August 2022.

== History ==
=== Early years ===
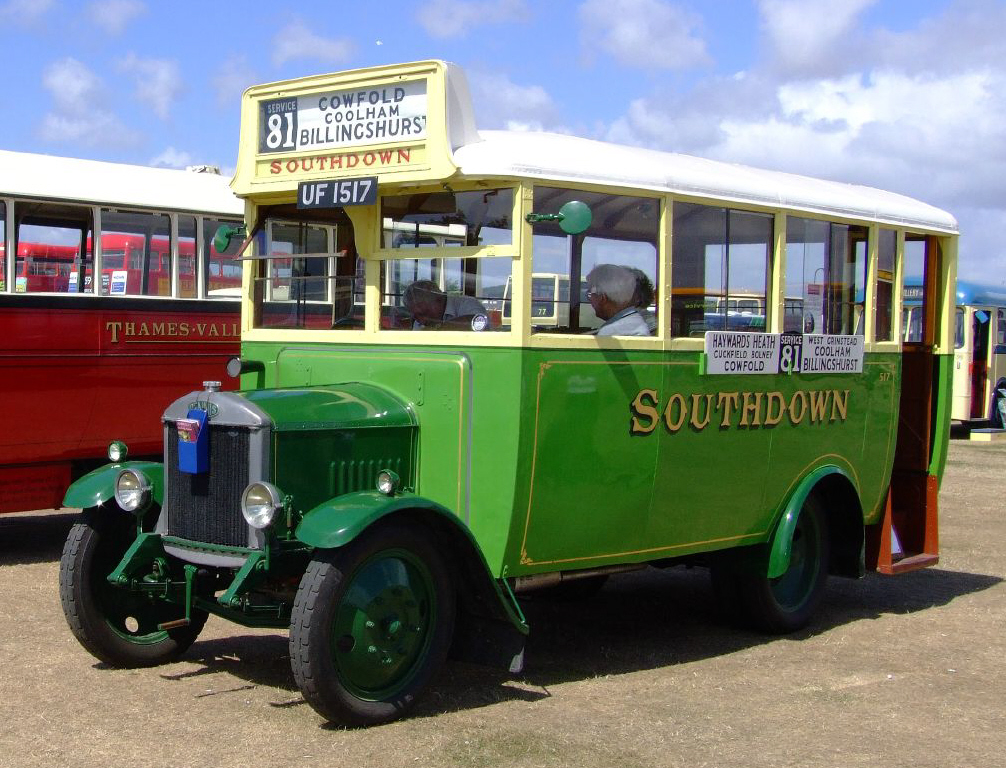
Preserved Dennis Motors 30cwt commercial truck fitted with Short Brothers bodywork at the 2006 Worthing bus rally

Southdown Motor Services can trace its history back to a pair of steam buses operated by the Sussex Motor Road Car Company Limited between Pulborough and Worthing. However, the company itself was formed in June 1915 out of the mergers of the Brighton, Hove and Preston United Omnibus, London and South Coast Haulage Services and Worthing Motor Services companies, the merger having been carried out to aid each companies' survival and to stave off staff, material and vehicle shortages brought about by World War I. The original registered office was in Middle Street, Brighton and in 1916, a garage was built in Freshfield Road, which was repeatedly enlarged as Southdown grew. The operating area of the company was bounded by Eastbourne, Portsmouth and the Sussex border.

In 1921, joint services with Maidstone & District Motor Services were started between Brighton and Hawkhurst (later service 18) and Eastbourne and Hastings via Hailsham (15). Similar joint services with Hants & Dorset Motor Services to Southampton and Winchester began in 1922, although the Winchester service was truncated at Fareham in 1926. Horsham marked the boundary with Aldershot & District, Southdown later abandoning its operations in Haslemere in favour of the Aldershot company.

Southdown also began to establish a programme of local long-distance tours throughout the 1920s and it was in 1921 that the Southdown scroll logo was adopted. Southdown pursued a policy of purchasing rival operators to consolidate its business. Companies acquired included Royal Red Coaches of Hove and Eastbourne operators Foard's, Cavendish, Southern Glideway and Chapman & Sons.

=== Expansion ===
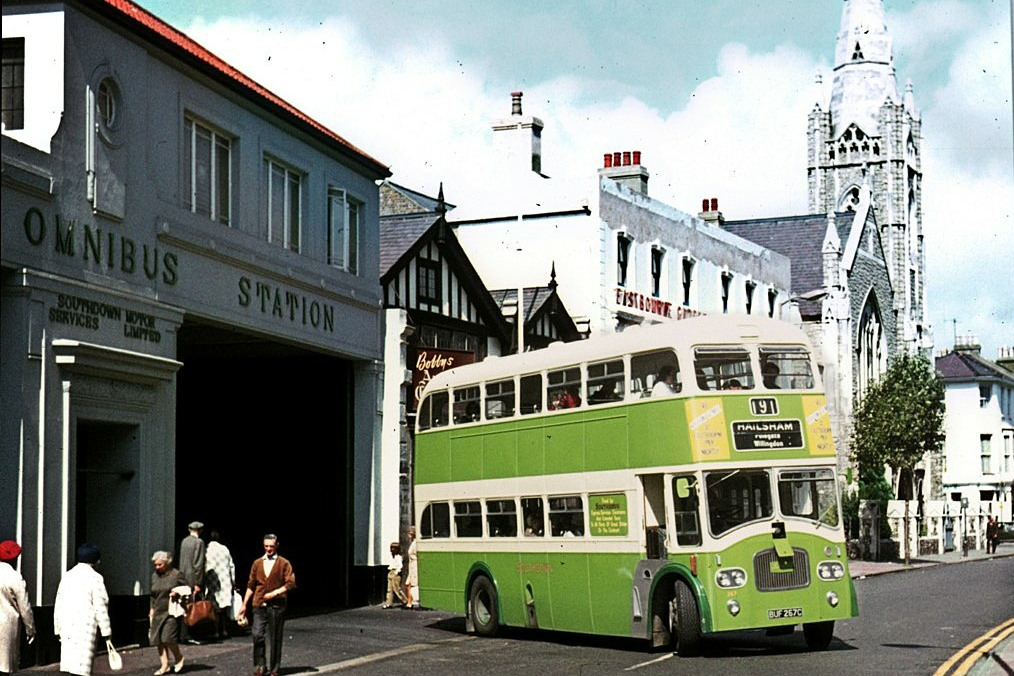
Northern Counties 'Queen Mary' Leyland Titan PD3 departing a Southdown bus station in Eastbourne in August 1972

Regular express services began in 1924, initially running between Brighton and London's Lupus Street coach station in Pimlico before moving to the new Victoria Coach Station in 1932. Southdown turned to Hove coach builder Harrington for coach bodies, an arrangement that continued until the 1960s.

In 1929, the company started a joint coastal express service with East Kent Road Car Company and Hants & Dorset between Bournemouth and Margate, running in competition with an existing Royal Blue service. This service later known as the South Coast Express, and eventually including Royal Blue into the joint operation, continued until the 1970s.

Southdown's early orders favoured Tilling-Stevens chassis until the outbreak of World War II, although some all-Leyland Titans provided the company with its first closed top vehicles in 1929. The Titan continued to be the favoured double deck chassis until the end of BET's interest in the company. Oil engines were favoured and bodywork provided by a number of different coachbuilders, although Park Royal provided the majority of bus bodies, a relationship which continued into the NBC period.

Southdown benefited from the establishment of the London Passenger Transport Board in 1933, gaining services previously operated by East Surrey and Autocar in the Weald south of East Grinstead and Crawley. This also extended the company's eastern boundary to Heathfield.

Southdown became associated with British Electric Traction (BET) following the division of Tilling Group and the BET's Tilling & British Automobile Traction grouping in 1942. World War II was a difficult time in many ways for the company, although the casualties from enemy action remained low. Southdown's assistant traffic manager devised a scheme to overcome delays caused by the blackout on country routes by extending journey times on evening services, ensuring that connections would be maintained.

In 1946, a co-ordination agreement with the Portsmouth Corporation was reached with the aim of restoring pre-war express services and coaching excursions, splitting mileage and ticket receipts between the two operators at a 57:43 share, with Southdown being the minority shareholder. Services were interworked between the two operators This often had the result, at the end of the year, that buses from one operator would be transferred onto routes of the other to balance the mileage, with drivers and conductors not change between the two operators. This replaced an earlier agreement dating from 1931, which involved 2d. protective fares on Southdown routes than ran within the city. The co-ordination of services, named the Portsmouth Area Joint Transport Services, lasted until deregulation in 1986.

After the war, Southdown started its first overseas tours with a 17-day tour to France and Switzerland in 1950, operated by Leyland Tiger number 1223. This coach was transferred to Northern Ireland in 1951, where it became the first to operate a programme of Irish tours for the company. 1950 also saw the introduction of scenic open top services from Brighton to Devil's Dyke and Eastbourne to Beachy Head, operated by wartime Guy buses converted to open-top vehicles.

Beacon Motor Services of Crowborough was fully acquired in 1954, although it had been controlled by Southdown since 1949. The company also controlled three services operated by Sargents of East Grinstead although these passed to Maidstone & District in 1951. In 1957 Southdown also entered into the Heathfield Pool agreement (also known as the Heathfield Cycle) with Maidstone & District by which all services through Heathfield became joint operations.

In 1958, mileage agreements were reached with the London Transport Executive for services in Crawley and with Brighton & Hove and Brighton Corporation for services in Brighton - establishing Brighton Area Transport Services, similar to the arrangements in Portsmouth established in the previous decade. The post war building programme continued with garages established at Crawley, Hassocks, Moulsecoomb and Seaford, while bus stations were opened in Chichester, Haywards Heath and Lewes.

It was during the late 1950s and 1960s that Southdown purchased many of the vehicle types most commonly associated with the company, notably the Leyland Titan PD3 'Queen Mary' vehicles, of which 285 were delivered with Northern Counties bodywork. Southdown did not take deliveries of rear engined double deck vehicles until 1970, when it purchased a batch of ten Daimler Fleetlines with Northern Counties bodywork for delivery to Brighton & Hove, as well as a number of Bristol VRTs with Eastern Coach Works (ECW) bodies painted in green and cream livery. A further batch of Fleetlines with ECW bodywork were delivered in 1972.

In 1964, Southdown moved into new headquarters in Freshfield Road, which also became the headquarters of Brighton Hove & District in 1969 when that company passed to Southdown. The only visible difference at first was the addition of 2000 to the fleet numbers. Later vehicles were painted in Southdown's green and cream livery with the fleetname 'Southdown BH&D'. With the advent of NBC, green/white livery was adopted and the BH&D suffix dropped from the fleetname, although by 1985 most Brighton area Southdown vehicles carried Brighton & Hove fleetnames, being operated as a dedicated section of the company within the former BH&D area.

=== National Bus Company ===
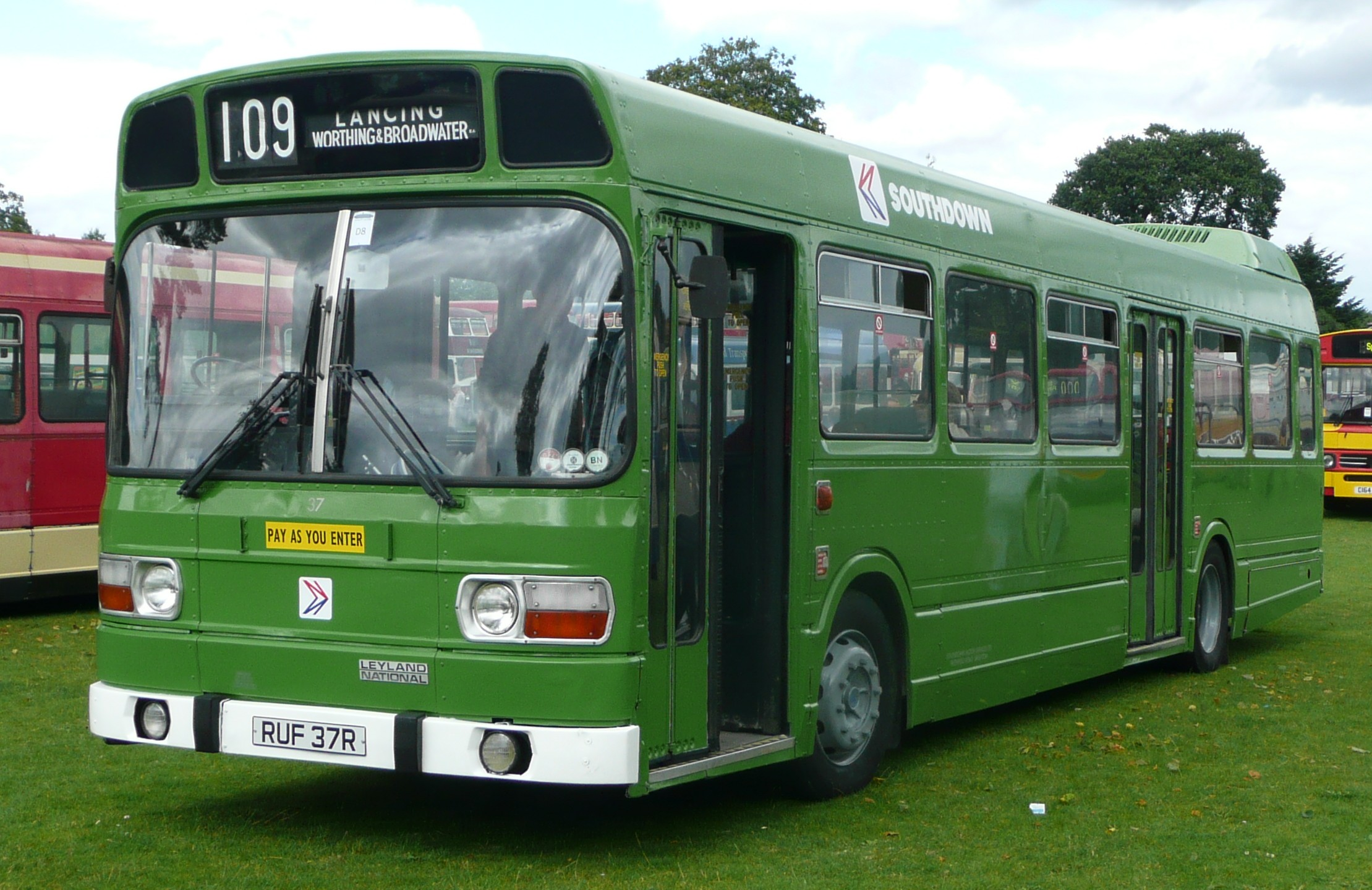
Preserved NBC Southdown Leyland National at the 2008 Alton bus rally

In January 1969, Southdown became part of the state-owned National Bus Company, following the company's earlier sale from the BET to the Transport Holding Company. Little change was noticeable at first, the corporate green and white livery not appearing until the early 1970s. There was, however, an influx of rear-engined double decker vehicles into the fleet, starting with Bristol VRTs and later Leyland Atlantean AN68s with Park Royal bodywork. The Leyland National became the standard single deck bus while the Leyland Leopard fulfilled coach orders. Southdown succeeded in maintaining a certain individuality during its NBC years, even painting some coaches in traditional livery and fleetnames (albeit with a small NBC logo). 1971 also saw the transfer of most Crawley services to and from London Country - a newly formed organisation within the National Bus Company.

1975 saw the forerunner of the 'Stagecoach' limited stop services with the 51 mile Brighton to Portsmouth Coastliner route 700. The following year saw the introduction of the 'Solenteer' between Portsmouth and Southampton (X71), operated jointly with Hants & Dorset. On the launch of both these services, messages were exchanged between the mayors of the terminus towns. This was followed by the Regency Route (729) in 1977 between Brighton and Tunbridge Wells, operated jointly with Maidstone & District.

These routes were rebranded as Stage Coach in 1982. The network included services from Brighton to Worthing, Bognor Regis, Chichester and Portsmouth (700), Newhaven and Eastbourne (712), Lewes, Uckfield and Tunbridge Wells (729), Haywards Heath (770) and between Eastbourne and East Grinstead (780) and Rye via Hastings (799). The Stage Coach brand was also applied to occasional services to Winchester and Salisbury (710), Hawkhurst and Canterbury (718), Windsor and St Albans (735), and Oxford (738).

Southdown shared the operation of the Flightline 777 Service between Crawley, Gatwick Airport and London Victoria with London Country's Green Line operation. This service initially used Leyland Leopards, and latterly Leyland Tigers, and was one of four "airport network" service connecting Gatwick, Heathrow, Luton and Stansted Airports with Central London.

=== Privatisation ===
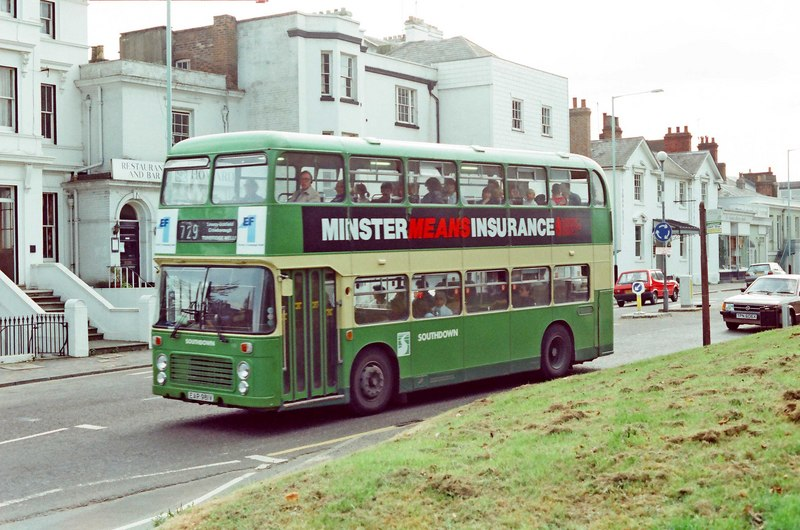
ECW bodied Bristol VRT wearing deregulation livery in Royal Tunbridge Wells in October 1988

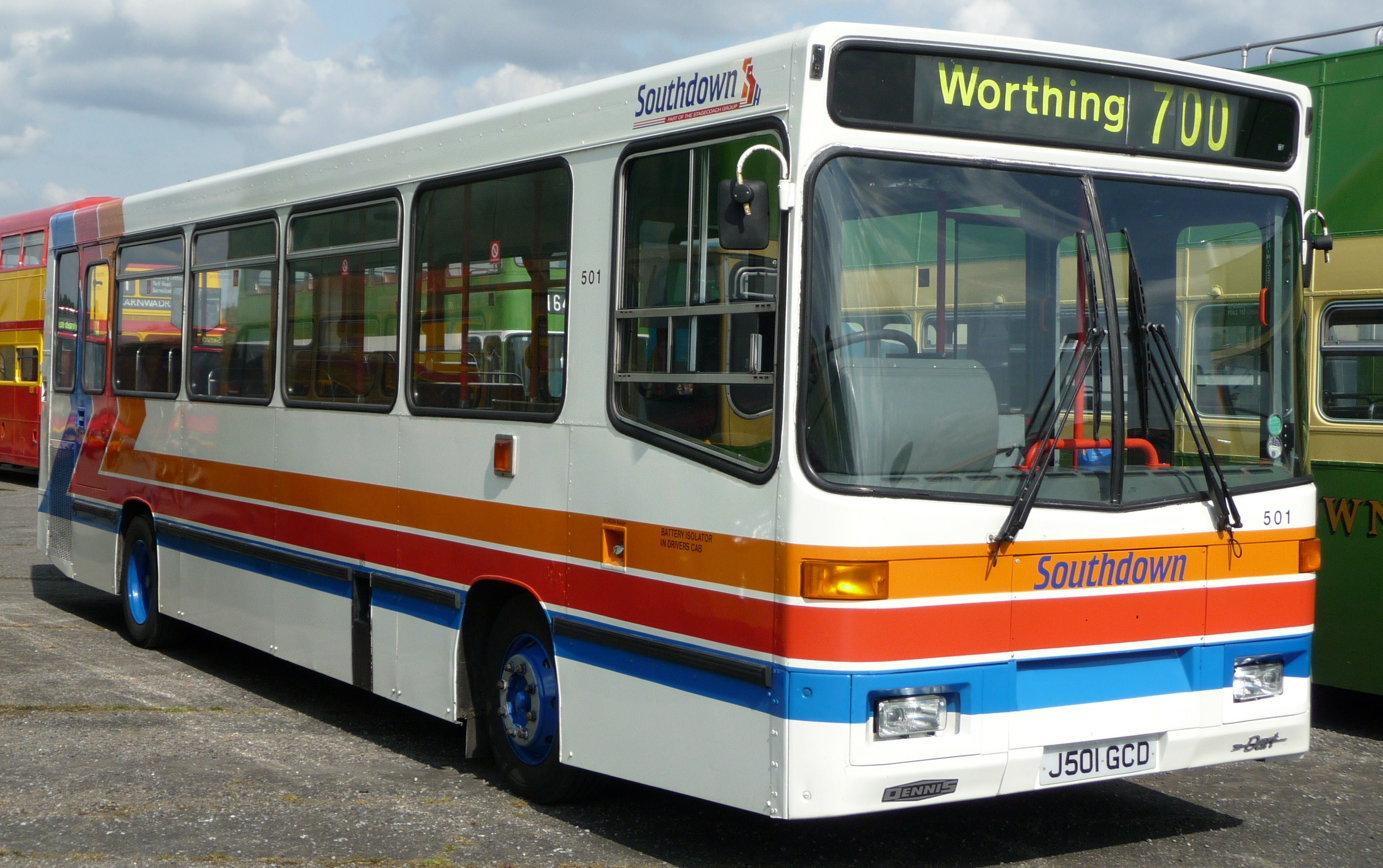
Stagecoach Southdown Alexander Dash bodied Dennis Dart in Stagecoach's original 'stripes' fleet livery

Southdown celebrated its seventieth anniversary in 1985, the same year of the passage of the Transport Act 1985 which enabled the deregulation of the bus industry a year later, and buses carried a special logo which also appeared on publicity. With deregulation, the company was split into four bus operating divisions in Brighton & Hove, Hampshire and West and East Sussex, with separate coaching and central engineering divisions later formed. The Brighton & Hove division was separated from Southdown in 1986, becoming the Brighton & Hove Bus and Coach Company, which in May 1987 was sold in a management buyout. A version of Southdown's traditional livery was adopted, albeit with less cream than on the pre-NBC incarnation. The scroll fleetname returned on minibus operations and eventually the operations, except for Brighton & Hove, were reunified as Southdown.

In October 1987, four of Southdown's directors, managing director Philip Ayers, commercial director Roland Higgins, engineering director Michael Gooch and financial director David Charlton, achieved a management buyout of the company from the NBC for £2 million (equivalent to £5,292,000 in 2025). After nearly two years of management-employee ownership, Southdown was then acquired by Stagecoach Holdings in August 1989, beating a competitive bid by the Harrogate-based AJS Group. Fleet vehicles were soon painted in a variant of the standard Stagecoach 'stripes' livery, featuring fleetnames bearing "SOUTHDOWN - Part of the Stagecoach Group".

Stagecoach went on to purchase the operations of fellow former-NBC operator Hastings & District Transport, incorporating its operations into Southdown, and also purchased the management-Southampton Citybus consortium-owned Portsmouth Citybus with similar intentions to merge into Southdown, however despite a ruling in 1990 by the Monopolies and Mergers Commission stating that the takeover was not the public interest but had not caused any adverse effects on the local market, this operation was sold by Stagecoach to Transit Holdings in 1991.

Southdown's existence ended effectively in April 1992 when the company changed its name to South Coast Buses Ltd and split into two divisions. Southdown's eastern operations, incorporating Eastbourne and Hastings, were rebranded under 'East Sussex' and used both 'Southdown' Bus and 'Hastings Bus' brand names, while the western half, incorporating Havant, Worthing and Chicester, were rebranded under 'Coastline Buses'. Upon the closure of the depot in Eastbourne in 2003, operations were split again, with the eastern end becoming "Stagecoach in Hastings" and the western division becoming "Stagecoach in the South Downs". The legal title of the western division then reverted to Southdown Motor Services Ltd.

Until September 2005, Stagecoach South had four depots remaining in East Sussex, these being an outstation in Eastbourne and depot buildings in Lewes, Seaford and Uckfield; the business in this area was sold to Brighton & Hove along with 15 buses and 66 staff, however the depot in Lewes was not included and was subsequently closed.

In 2008, the Leyland PD3 or "Queen Marys" celebrated 50 years of operation, with many events held across the Southdown area.

Between 2000 and 2005, "Queen Marys" were operated on route 77 between Brighton and Devil's Dyke during the summer months by Southcoast Motor Services which is an operator specialising in operating preserved ex-Southdown buses. Southcoast Motor Services took its name from the original proposed name of Southdown Motor Services.
