= Bright Bricks =

Toy construction brick building company

Bright Bricks is a toy construction brick building company based in Bordon, Hampshire. The company was founded by Duncan Titmarsh in 2010 and subsequently became a LEGO-certified building company, until its 2018 takeover by Live Group, withdrawal from the LEGO Certified Professional program, and move to using non-LEGO plastic bricks.

The company previously specialised in LEGO builds for corporate clients. Some of their better known work included a 12-metre-tall (39 ft) Christmas tree at St Pancras railway station, a large replica of the Netto mascot which toured UK stores prior to Netto's withdrawal from the UK market, a jet engine from a Boeing 787 Dreamliner, and a multicoloured oak tree wrapping around a concrete pillar at Hamad International Airport. In 2015 they built a large-scale train for the Covent Garden Christmas celebrations.
