= Farlington, Hampshire =

Suburb of Portsmouth, Hampshire, England

Coordinates: 50.846°N 1.033°W

Farlington
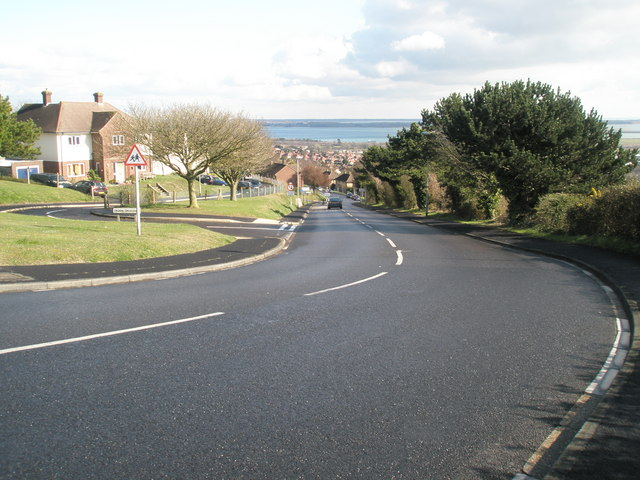
- Farlington Avenue

- Location within Hampshire
- Unitary authority: Portsmouth
- Ceremonial county: Hampshire
- Region: South East
- Country: England
- Sovereign state: United Kingdom
- Post town: PORTSMOUTH
- Postcode district: PO6
- Dialling code: 023
- Police: Hampshire and Isle of Wight
- Fire: Hampshire and Isle of Wight
- Ambulance: South Central
- UK Parliament: Portsmouth North

Farlington is a primarily residential district of the city of Portsmouth in the ceremonial county of Hampshire, England. It is located in the extreme north east of the city on the mainland and is not on Portsea Island unlike most of the other areas of Portsmouth. Farlington was incorporated into the city in 1932 and now forms a continuous development with Cosham and Drayton. To the north of Farlington is the suburb of Widley and to the east is the town of Havant. To the west is the suburb of Drayton, and to the south is Langstone Harbour.

== History ==
Farlington was a small rural community for the majority of its existence, being part of an ancient manor and parish that also included nearby Crookhorn and Stakes (Frendstaple), places still outside the City boundary. In 1320 the manor passed to Hugh Despenser the Elder but following the forfeiture of his lands, King Edward II granted the manor of Farlington to Alice, the late wife of Edmund Earl of Arundel. Alice only held the manor for a short time, for by 1330 it had come into the king's hands, and was granted to John Montgomerie and his wife Rose for life. On the death of John Montgomerie, King Edward III gave the manor to nearby Southwick Priory. Farlington was sold to William Pound of Beaumonds in 1540. The land changed hands several times before being divided for individual dwellings in the 19th and 20th centuries.

In 1891 a racecourse, called 'Portsmouth Park', was built in Farlington, between the Havant road and the shoreline. This new course was built with all of the modern facilities available at the time, including its own railway station (built at Station Road in Drayton), with the intention of turning it into premier tracks. However race meetings were suspended during World War One and the War Office turned the course into one of the country's biggest ammunition dumps. After hostilities ceased, the War Office held control of the site and it was not released until 1929 when it was bought by Portsmouth City Council. The council then sold on the land for private housing development, eventually leading to the end of Farlington as a distinct community.

Farlington is also the site of the Portsmouth Water Company's filtration beds. In 1812 Thomas Smith built a reservoir to hold spring water from Farlington Marshes. The waterworks were built in 1908 and by 1924 there were five reservoirs and eight sand filters. Many of the local roads to the north of the Havant Road were named after senior company officers. Among these are Grant, Woodfield, Galt, Gillman and Evelegh roads.

Farlington was also home to Farlington Redoubt, part of the defence ring of forts around Portsmouth now known as "Palmerston's Folly". The redoubt was initially a camp with an Admiralty semaphore erected in 1822. However, this camp was demolished by 1867 and the area gradually developed into a full fort to protect the city from a possible French invasion. By 1891 all works has been completed, including the mounting of seven 64pdr guns. The redoubt was demolished after the Second World War when the site was excavated as a quarry and later developed as an underground gas storage area and aggregate recycling facility. Nothing of the fort remains except the outline of the pit in which it sat, however some of the other forts still remain, including Fort Purbrook, Fort Widley and Fort Southwick.

== Governance ==
Farlington is part of the Drayton and Farlington local electoral ward of Portsmouth City Council, a unitary authority which is responsible for local affairs. The ward is represented by three city councillors.

Farlington is part of the Portsmouth North parliamentary constituency, currently represented in the House of Commons by Amanda Martin of the Labour Party.

In 1931 the civil parish had a population of 5672. On 1 April 1932 the parish was abolished and merged with Portsmouth and Havant, part also went to form Southwick and Widley. It is now in the unparished area of Portsmouth.

== Community Facilities ==
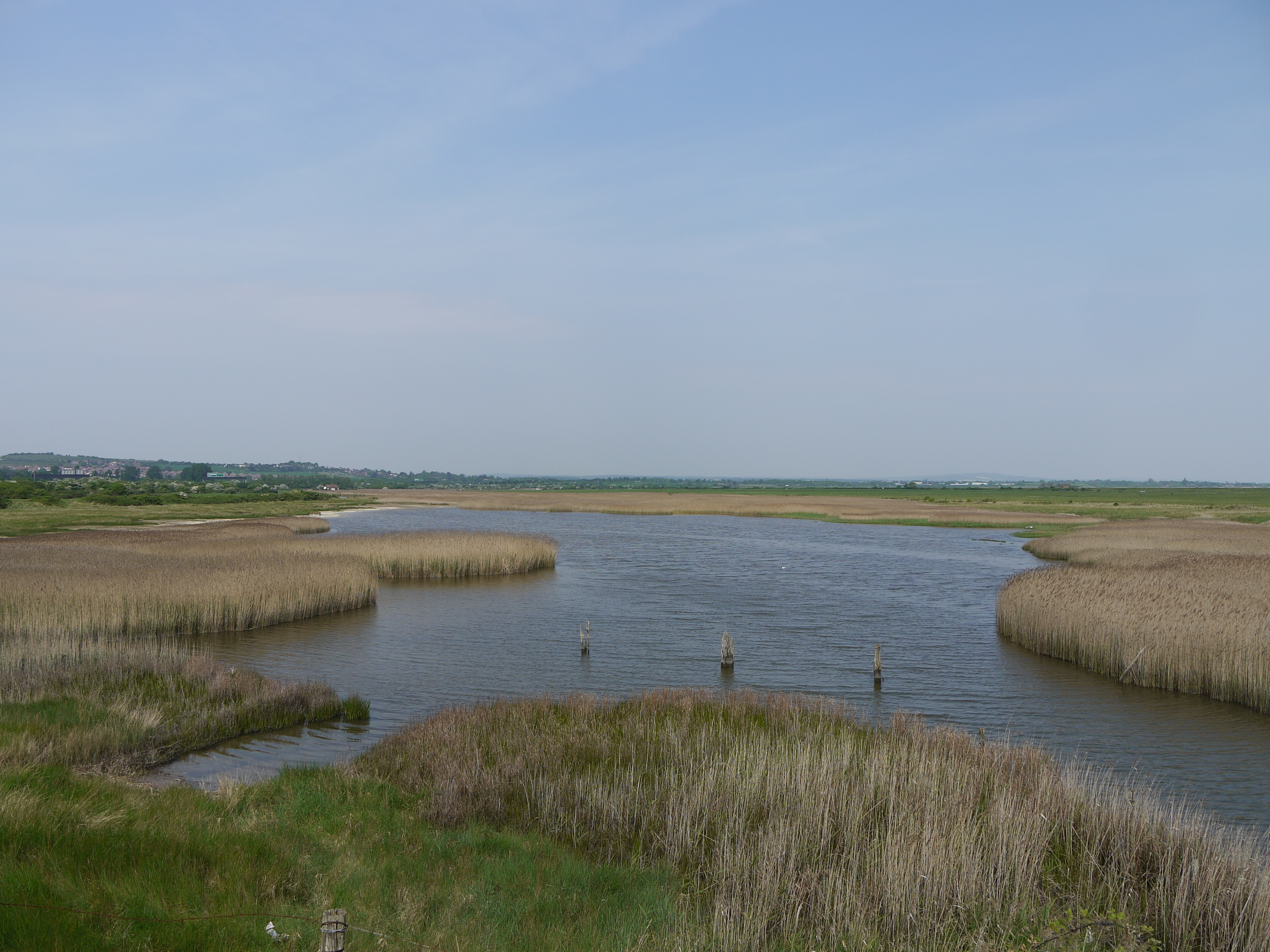
Farlington Marshes.

Farlington has several parks and open spaces for public recreation, most of which are owned by Portsmouth City Council. These include the Farlington Playing Fields (a large area of open space with football pitches and cricket fields), East Lodge Play Area (an open space with a children's play area and ball court), Zetland field (a small triangular open space with a children's play area) and the Waterworks Field Play Area (a neighbourhood park with play area and ball court). Farlington Marshes is also open to the public for walking and birdwatching.

There are no medical facilities in Farlington; the nearest doctor's surgery is located in nearby Drayton. The nearest public library is Cosham.

== Transport ==
Farlington is bordered to the south and east by the A27 road and A3 road respectively. The A2030 road known as the Havant Road is the principal local road that runs east/west through the middle of Farlington. The M27 motorway lies 1 km to the west of Farlington.

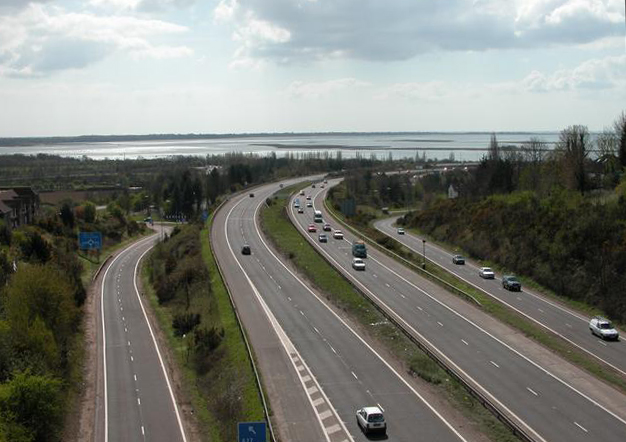
The A3(M) and A27 road interchange on the eastern edge of Farlington.

Farlington has no immediate railway station and lies midway between Cosham railway station to the west and Bedhampton railway station to the east. Farlington had its own station, Farlington Halt but this closed on 4 July 1937. The station was built at Station Road in Drayton to serve Farlington racecourse but was later used for munitions and other light industrial traffic. On 23 July 1894, the station was the scene of an accident when a brake van derailed and the first two coaches overturned. The guard on the train was killed and seven passengers were injured, one of whom seriously.

== Landmarks and Religious Sites ==
The parish of Farlington has two churches - the historic parish church of St. Andrew and the Church of the Resurrection. St. Andrew's is situated at the eastern end of the district on the main Havant Road. Adjacent to the church on the west side once stood Farlington House which was demolished in the 1960s to make way for a new housing estate that extended Old Rectory Road. The first recorded mention of St. Andrew's church was in 1200 in a dispute between two nobles concerning the presentation to the church of St Andrew at Farlington. A slightly later document from Southwick Priory in 1215 also dedicates the church to St. Andrew. While some of the 13th century masonry has survived, the majority of the current St. Andrew's Church is the result of restorations and alterations carried out by George Edmund Street between 1872 and 1875. Street's parents had married in 1815 at the church which later became part of the Portsmouth conurbation. Street's restoration, for which the design was carried out in 1858, created a delightful small Victorian village church ... rich in detail. Adjacent to the south-west corner of the church is the First World War memorial containing 84 names of those from the area who died during the war.

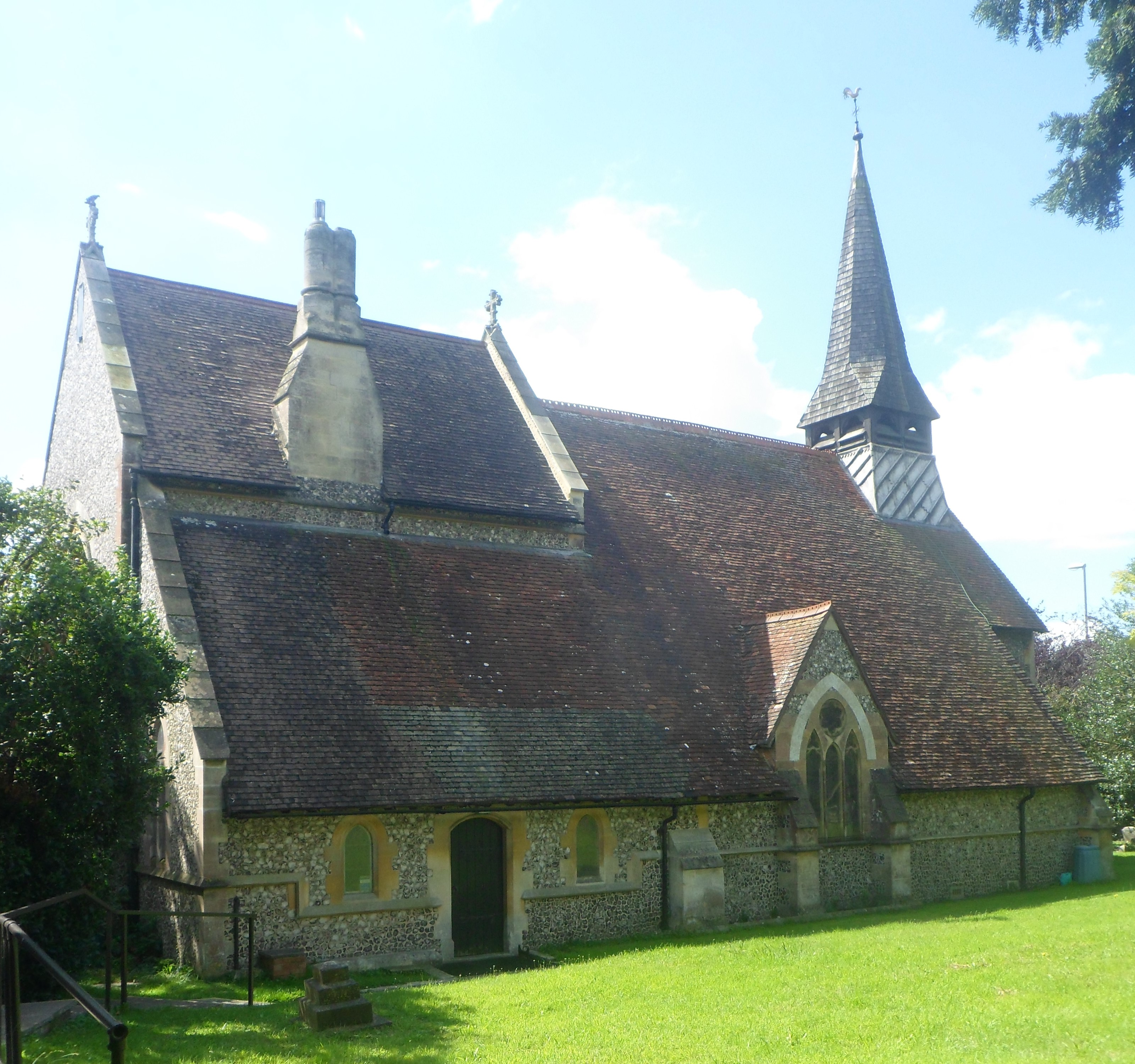
St. Andrew's Church

To service the increasing local population of Farlington, the Church of the Resurrection was built in 1930. Designed by the architect Randoll Blacking of the firm Paget and Seeley, the church was built by S. Salter and Company. However, due to boundary changes, it is now geographically located in Drayton.

The Farlington Marshes lie to the south of Farlington and form part of Langstone Harbour. The marshes are a 119.7-hectare (296-acre) Local Nature Reserve, owned by Portsmouth City Council and managed by the Hampshire and Isle of Wight Wildlife Trust. A Site of Special Scientific Interest (SSSI), the marshes now host a vast number of migratory, overwintering wildfowl, including Brent Geese, Wigeons, Teals, Avocets, Redshanks and Dunlins. The marshes were gradually reclaimed from the harbour in 1770 by the Lord Mayor of Farlington. They were designated as a local Nature Reserve in 1974.

The present-day boundary between Farlington and Drayton is defined as the A2030 Eastern Road which was opened on 6 May 1942, with Drayton to its west side and Farlington to its east.

== Notable people ==
Notable persons connected to Farlington include:

Thomas Pounde (29 May 1539 – 5 March 1614), an English Jesuit lay brother. After some thirty years spent in Elizabethan prisons for his Catholic faith, he is said to have died in the same room of the family house where he was born. However, recent archaeological proceedings indicate the house may have been in Farlington.

Thomas Atkinson, a warrant officer in the Royal Navy who served as master under Nelson and later as first master of HMNB Portsmouth is buried in Farlington, along with other members of his immediate family. Rear Admiral John Hayes, who served in the French Revolutionary and Napoleonic Wars is also buried in Farlington.

Southampton F.C. team captain and England national football team player James Ward-Prowse was born and grew up in Farlington.

Multiple Olympian and Olympic champion Jim Fox lived on First Avenue, Farlington when he won the Olympic gold medal for Modern Pentathlon at the 1976 Summer Olympics.

== Bibliography ==
- Balfour, Alan (1970), Portsmouth, City Buildings Series, London: Studio Vista, ISBN 0-289-79806-X
- Lloyd, David W. (1974), Buildings of Portsmouth and its Environs: A survey of the dockyard, defences, homes, churches, commercial, civic and public buildings, Portsmouth: City of Portsmouth, ISBN 0-901559-53-9
- Pevsner, Nikolaus (1974), Staffordshire, The Buildings of England, Harmondsworth: Penguin Books, ISBN 0-14-071046-9
- Pevsner, Nikolaus; Lloyd, David W. (1967), Hampshire and The Isle of Wight, The Buildings of England, London: Yale University Press, ISBN 978-0-300-09606-4
