= Portsbridge Creek =

Tidal waterway of Hampshire, England

Coordinates: 50°50.17′N 1°03.83′W

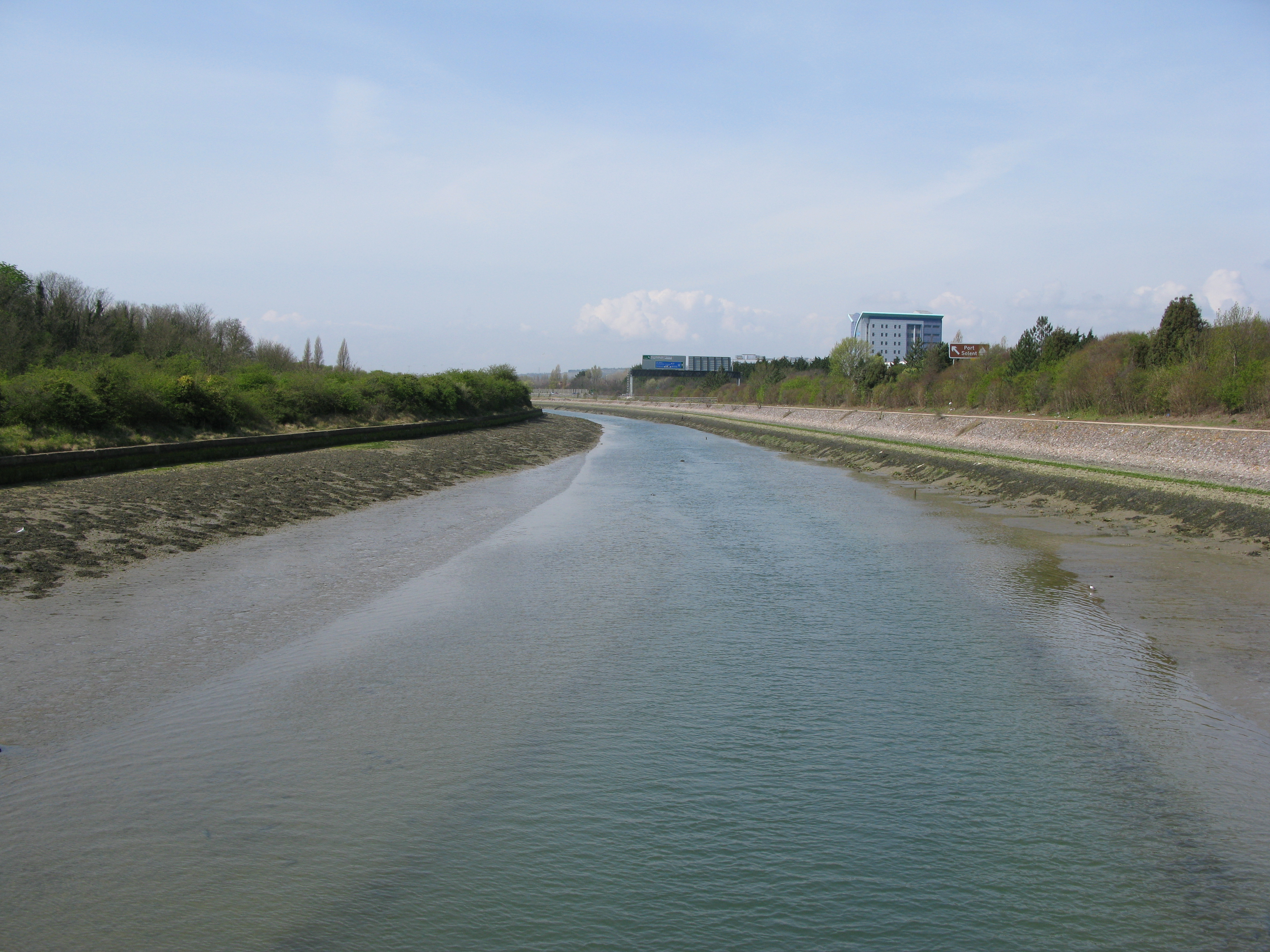
Part of Portsbridge Creek with the tide half in

Portsbridge Creek, known officially as Portsea Creek, formerly as Portsea Lake and informally as Ports Creek, Port Creek, Portcreek and Canal Creek, is a tidal waterway just off the southern coast of England that runs between Portsea Island and the mainland from Langstone Harbour to Tipner Lake.

The unofficial Portsbridge Creek name for the creek is an outdated name, formerly used when Portsea Island used to have only a single road bridge (named the Portsbridge) crossing between Portsea Island and the mainland. In modern times, Portsea Creek now has other crossings via road, rail and pedestrian bridges.

Through its history, Portsea Creek has been made navigable a number of times and it is today navigable for small boats, depending on tide.

== History ==
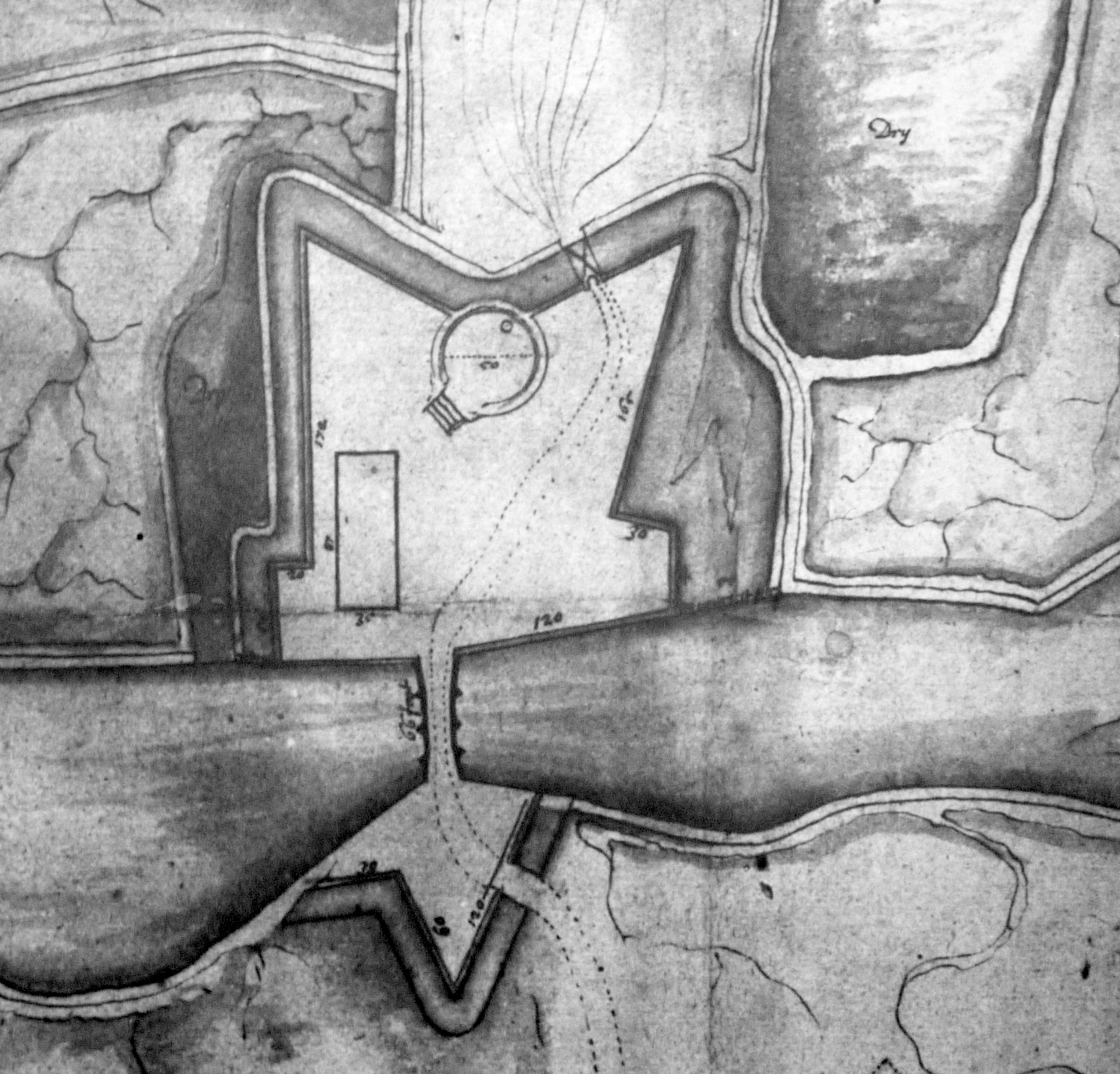
A plan of the fort defending the creek's crossing in 1660.

The creek and in particular the creek's crossing has been the site of defensive works possibly as far back as the reign of Henry VIII.

During the English Civil War Royalist forces attempted to hold the parliamentarian forces at the creek during the early stages of the Siege of Portsmouth. Defences consisted of a wooden barricade mounted on the bridge backed by a small fort equipped with 4 guns. The guns were withdrawn on 10 August 1642 and with the barricade held by as few as 8 men the parliamentarian forces were able to cross the creek two days later.

A fort at the site of the crossing of the creek turns up in plans from 1660 and 1666. The fort was rebuilt in 1688 under the direction of the Chief Royal Engineer Sir Martin Beckman.

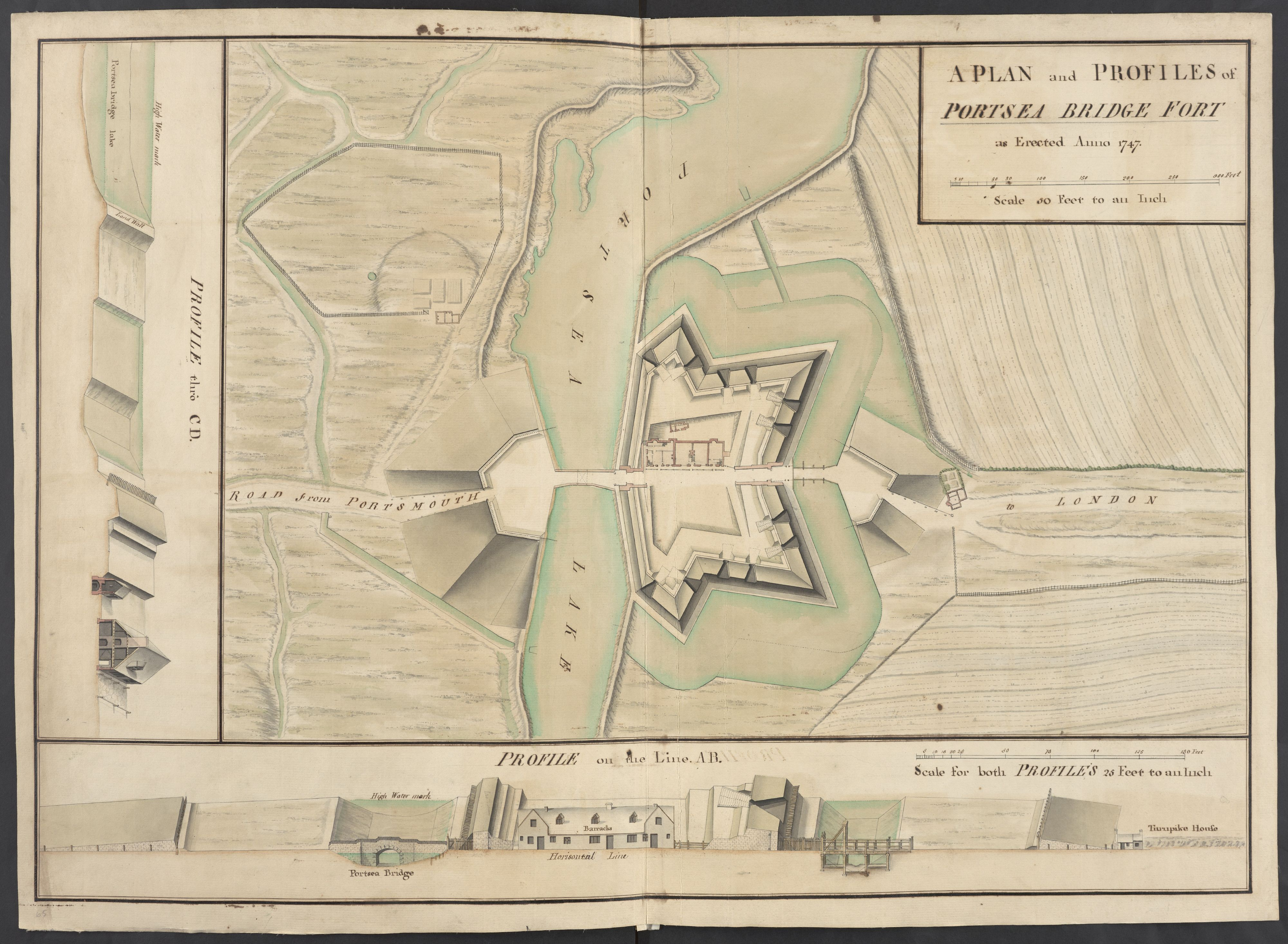
Plan and profiles of Portsea Bridge Fort, 1747 (by J. P. Desmaretz). Note that the creek is named as Portsea Lake.

It has been suggested that the presence of a customs officer in Cosham was to deal with attempts at landing contraband from Portsbridge Creek.

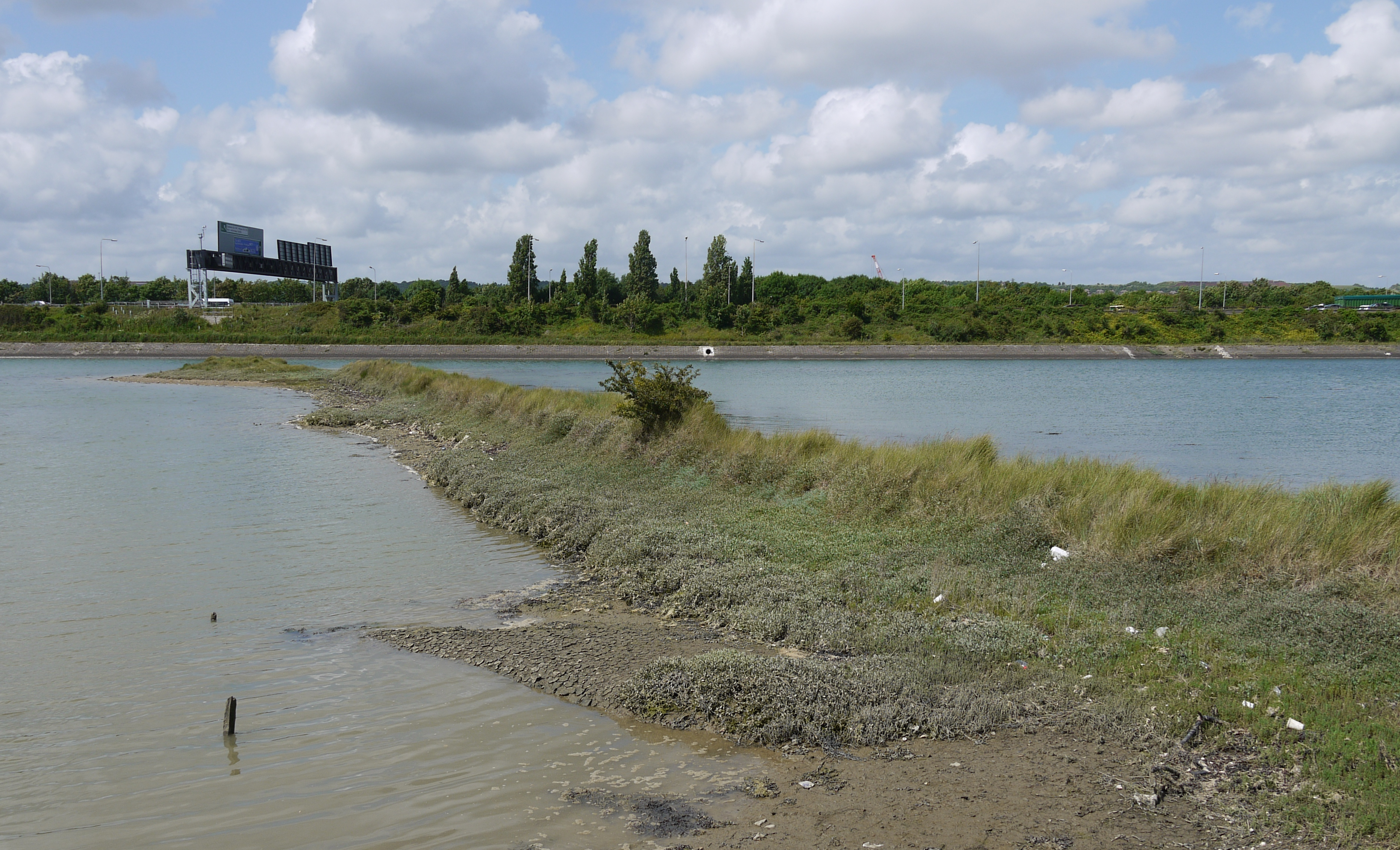
The remains of one of the dams built in the 1850s

The waterway was made navigable by the Portsmouth & Arundel Navigation company in 1830 after the failure of the Portsea Canal. The work to deepen the creek cost £1000. It proved difficult to keep the creek clear for navigation and a canal called the Cosham Canal to provide an alternative route was proposed, although it was never built. The canal company abandoned the creek in 1838. An army report on the status of the Hilsea Lines made in 1853 mentioned that the creek was filled with weeds to the point where for 3 to 4 hours every day it could be walked across. Later in the decade as part of upgrade works on the Hilsea Lines, the creek was widened and deepened to allow it to be used by gunboats. Dams and flood gates were constructed at the ends of the creek to allow it to be kept it in water at all stages of the tide. The remains of one of these dams can be seen at the eastern end of the creek.

In 1963 there was a suggestion that it be redeveloped as the Dunkirk Memorial Channel. In the late 1960s the A27 was built on part of the channel while the remainder was dredged. This, along with other improvements, made the creek navigable for small boats. In 2015 new flood defences were constructed alongside the creek between the railway bridge and the eastern road bridge.

== Bridges over the creek ==
Bridges have been built across the creek at various locations. The first record of a bridge across the creek date from the last decade of the 12th century. In the 15th-century double-arched stone bridge was built at the western end of the creek. In 1867 a new retractable bridge was constructed at a cost of £5,000 to allow the passage of gunboats. The bridge was built as a steel frame with a wooden deck consisting of two 12-foot-wide (3.7 m) lanes. In 1904 the bridge was transferred to the Portsmouth Corporation (forerunner of Portsmouth City Council) who fixed it in place and reinforced it to allow trams to run across it. The bridge was replaced by a wider bridge in 1927, which in turn was replaced by the current twin-bridge roundabout structure in 1970 during the construction of the A27.

The London, Brighton and South Coast Railway built a wooden bridge across the creek in 1847. This was replaced by a swing bridge in 1870. An Admiralty order required the bridge to open between 2 and 3 am on the first Sunday of every February. The swing bridge was supplanted by a drawbridge in 1909 which has been fixed in place since 1920. The railway junction to the immediate north of the current bridge is named Portcreek Junction, and forms the southern junction of the Railway Triangle, with Cosham Junction at its west and Farlington Junction at its east.

A road bridge was added at the eastern Langstone Harbour end of the creek in 1941, now known as the Eastern Road (Water) Bridge. Another crossing (Peronne Road) built during World War II was a causeway with the creek being limited to a small pipe. This was replaced by the current high level Peronne Road Footbridge (built in 1969) during the construction of the A27, which passes over both the creek and the A27.
