= Stamshaw =

Suburb of Portsmouth, Hampshire, England

Coordinates: 50.820847°N 1.080793°W

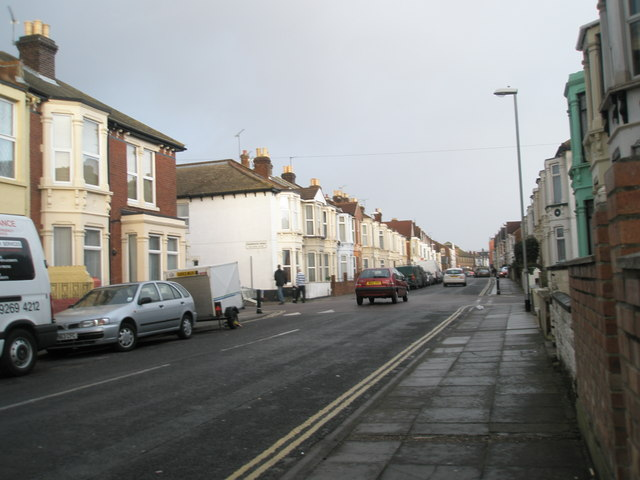
Angerstein Road, Stamshaw

Stamshaw is a residential district of Portsmouth, located on the north western corner of Portsea Island in southern England.

Much of it consists of dense rows of "two up, two down" terraced housing built during the late 19th century and early 20th century for dockyard workers and their families. Due to the rising cost of houses in the south in recent years, it has become one of the key areas for first time buyers.

The area once included a greyhound racing stadium (closed 2010 April and since has been demolished), Alexandra Park, with the Mountbatten Sports Centre, and Portsmouth International Port. To the north lie Tipner and Hilsea, and to the south are Kingston, Buckland and Commercial Road, the main retail area of the city. Stamshaw is bounded to its west by the M275 motorway and Whale Island, and to the east is North End. The main thoroughfares of Stamshaw are Twyford Avenue and Stamshaw Road, the two parts of a one-way traffic system that runs on a north–south axis to Northern Parade in Hilsea.

The local middle school is Stamshaw Junior School, and there is Stamshaw Infant School too.

Stamshaw Park has fields and an adventure playground.

In 1804 a Royal Powder Works was established on Stamshaw Point in connection with the gunpowder magazine at Tipner; by 1833, however, it had ceased operation, and no above-ground evidence of the site remains to be seen.

The area is home to St Saviour church of England church built between 1913 and 1914.
