= Sails of the South =

Artwork in Portsmouth, England

Coordinates: 50°49′59″N 1°5′9″W

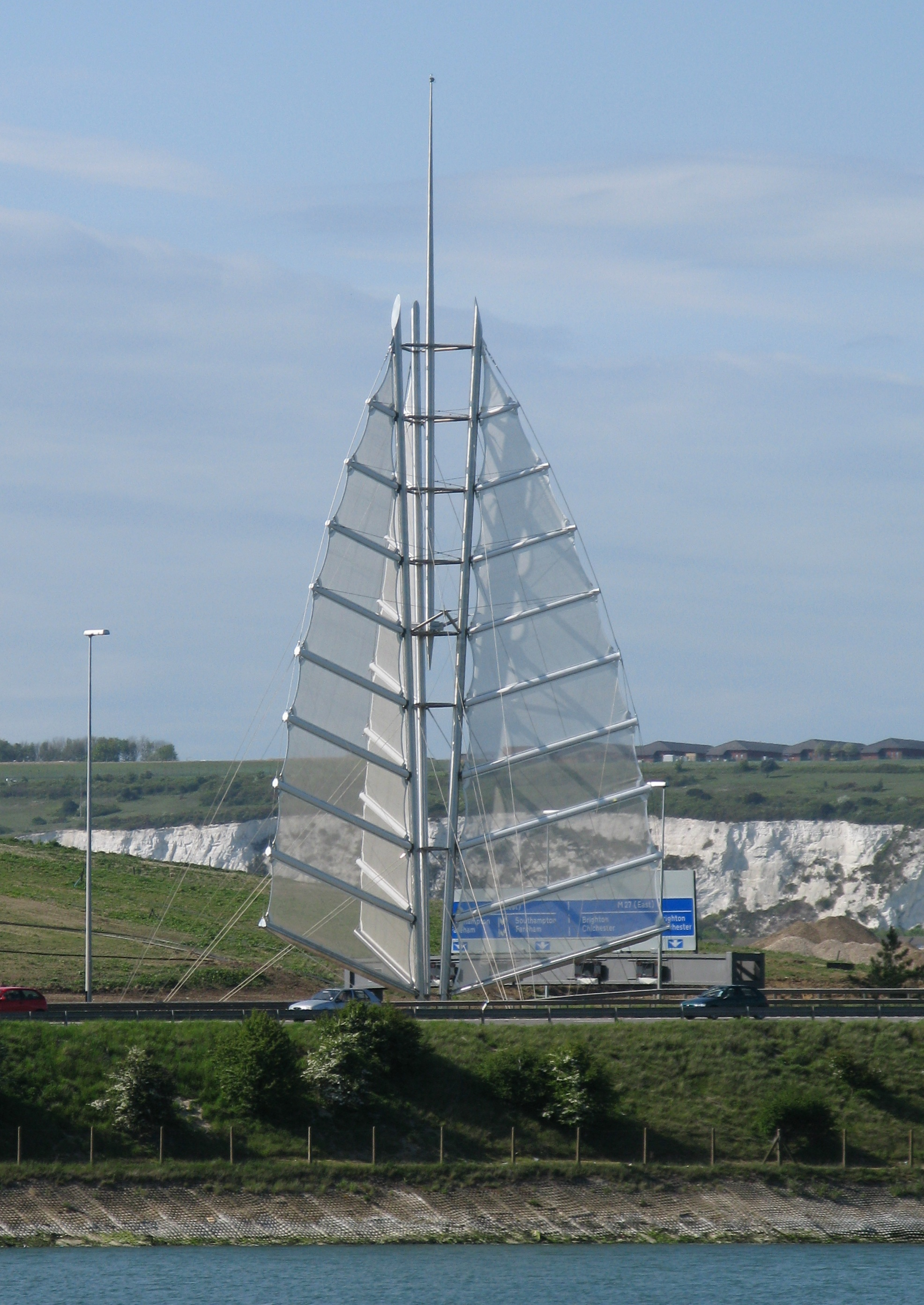
The Sails of the South

The Tri-Sail, commonly referred to as the Sails of the South, is a 43 m (141 ft)–high structure situated between two carriageways of the M275 motorway just outside Portsmouth, England. It was unveiled in March 2001 in order to enhance the entrance to the city as part of the regeneration scheme The Gateway Project. HGP Architects, whose offices are located in Fareham less than 5 miles (8.0 km) away, realised the scheme and installation. The structure is one of the tallest in Portsmouth.

The physical appearance of the Sails are a masted tri-sail, flanked by poles and cables on either side of the carriageway to form Tipner Bridge. The Sails are illuminated in violet at night. In addition, there are bird roosting sites in nearby Tipner Lake.

The sails of the south was part of the redundant but later revived gateway project, this and the refurbishment of the nearby bridge was the only parts of the project to be realised. The bridge intended to take the M275 over a roundabout of an unbuilt junction roundabout.

In 2006 vandals smashed 21 of the 24 lights that light up the structure.

Around the start of 2026 Portsmouth City Council carried our a survey of the structure as part of planning for repair work to mark the 100th anniversary of the city being awarded city status.
