= Tipner =

Suburb of Portsmouth, Hampshire, England

Coordinates: 50.8184°N 1.0875°W

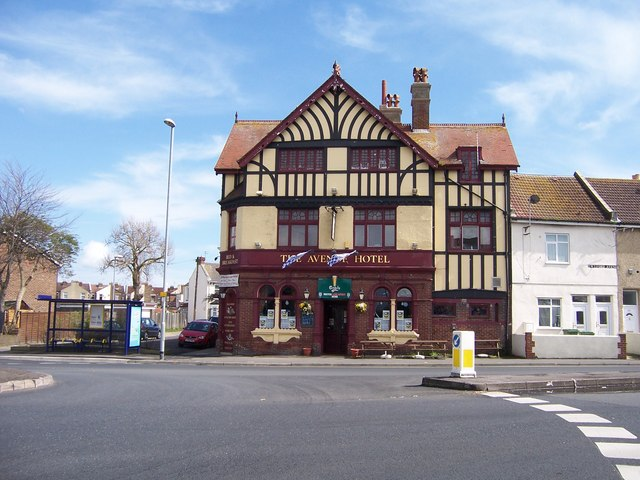
The Avenue Hotel, a former pub in Tipner

Tipner is a residential district of Portsmouth, located on the north western corner of Portsea Island in southern England. It includes a housing estate, built during the 1930s, that used to function as married quarters for the Royal Navy, a yachting club, allotments, a primary school, The Harbour special school, and indoor and outdoor rifle ranges. There is a nearby sports centre at Alexandra Park. Tipner is bounded to the north and west by the M275 motorway and Tipner Lake. To the south is Stamshaw.

== Gunpowder magazines ==
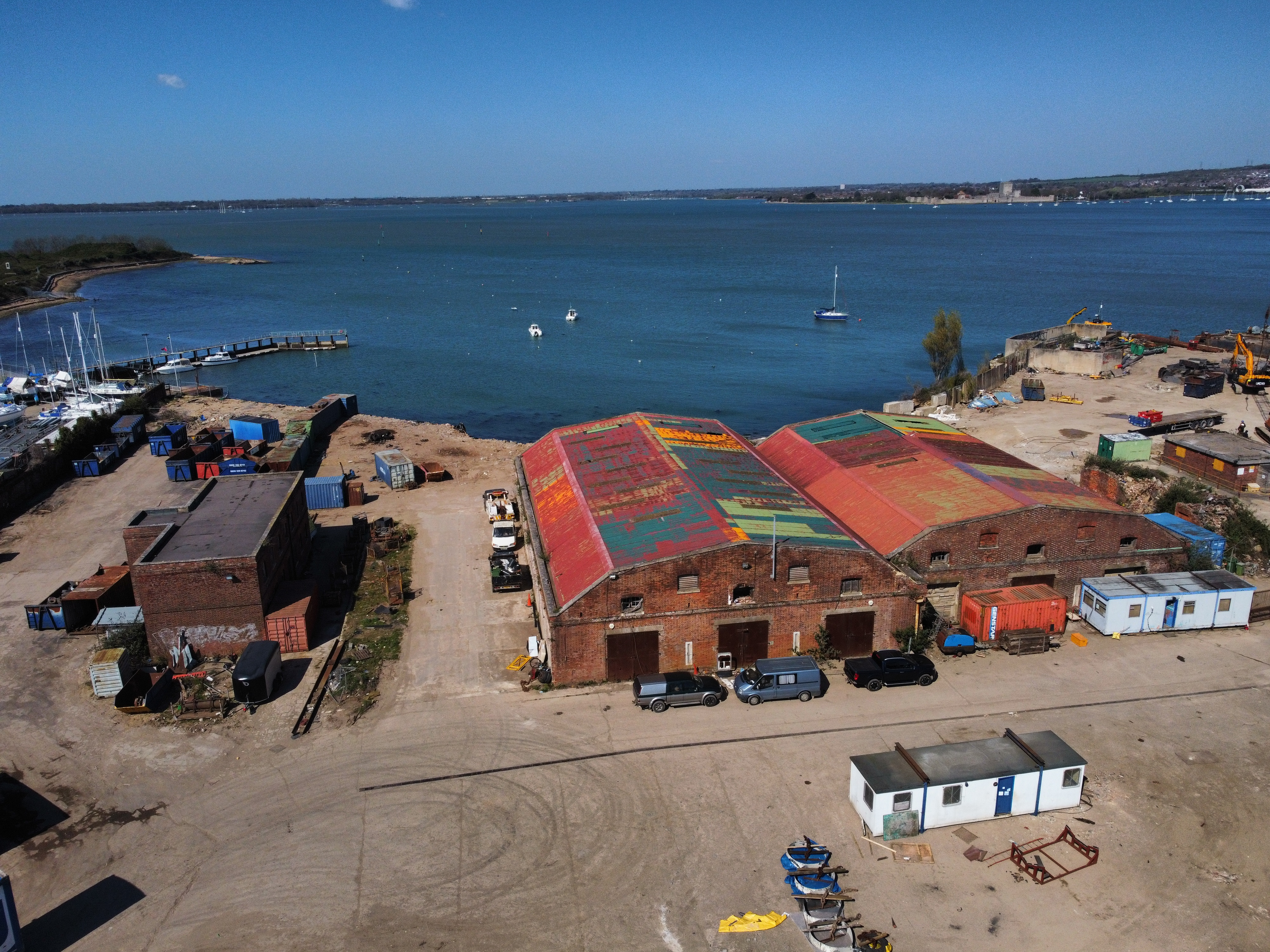
Adjoining gunpowder magazines, dating from 1856 (centre) and 1796 (right). Together with the 18th-century shifting house (left), cooperage (far right) and boundary wall (far left) they are Grade II-listed buildings.

In the 1790s a gunpowder magazine was constructed on Tipner Point (as part of the Board of Ordnance's policy of distributing gunpowder stored near the Royal Dockyards to a few more isolated and scattered locations).

By 1804 facilities had been built nearby on Stamshaw Point and Horsea Island to enable damp or damaged gunpowder offloaded from ships to be restored and then reused: from Tipner, the powder was taken first to Stamshaw, where it was unpacked from its barrels, assessed and sieved ("redusted"); from there it was taken to Horsea for the dangerous process of "restoving" (drying the damp powder in specialized ovens) after which it would either be returned directly to Tipner magazine ready for re-use, or else would go via the "mixing house" at Stamshaw to be blended with fresh powder.

The magazine of 1796 still stands at Tipner, together with a later (1850s) magazine and some ancillary buildings. At one time there was also a barracks which housed the troops tasked with protecting the facility.

== Royal Naval Rifle Range ==
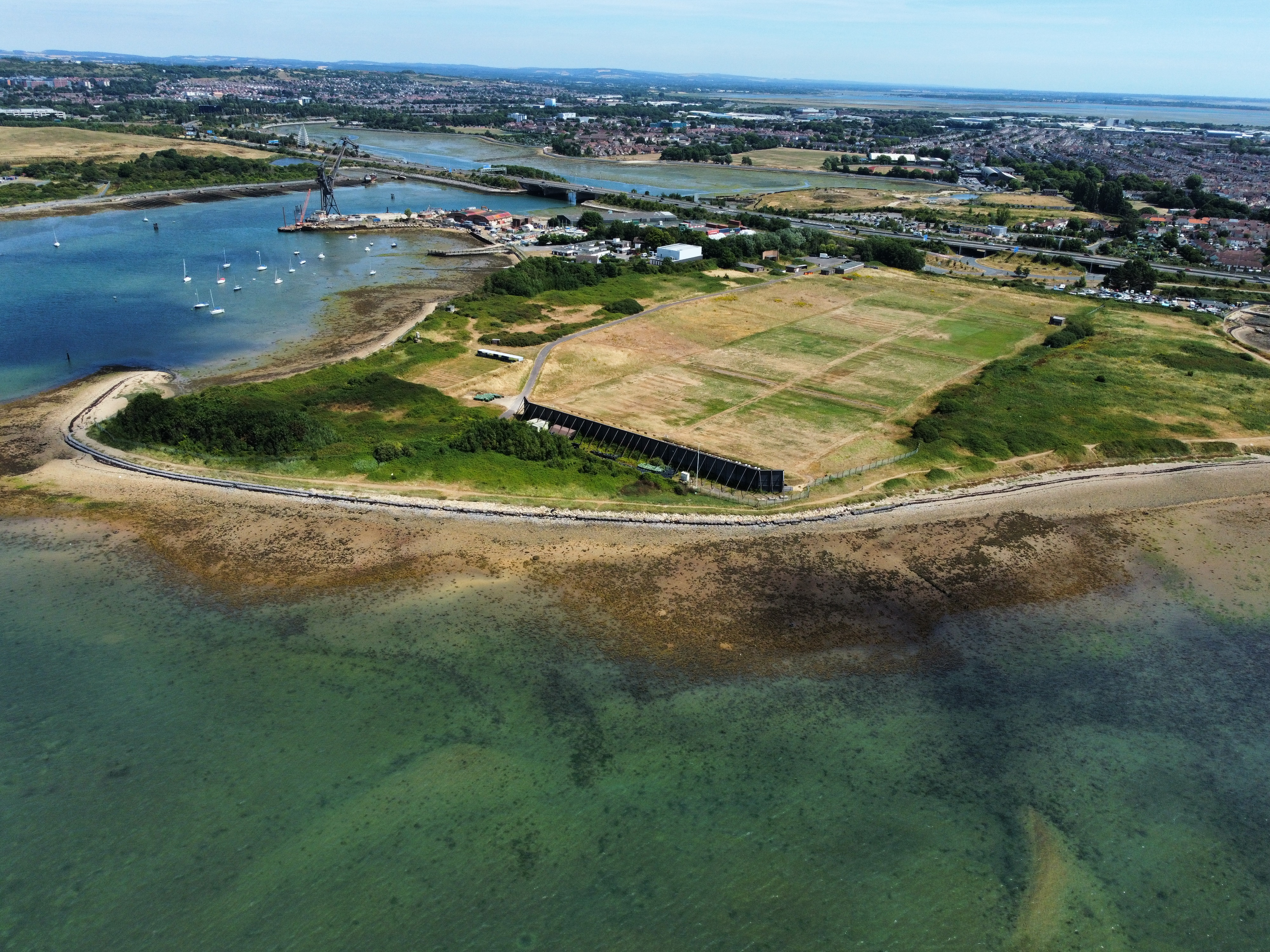
Tipner Range, which closed in 2020, is being considered for redevelopment as housing.

A rifle range was established at Tipner in the 19th century, in connection with the RN Gunnery School (HMS Excellent) on nearby Whale Island. It closed in 2020.

== HMS Phoenix ==
HMS Phoenix, the Royal Navy's fire-fighting, damage repair, and NBCD (Nuclear, Biological and Chemical Defence) training establishment, was located on the northern edge of Tipner, adjacent to Tipner Lake, between 1946 and 1993. In 1994 its operation was transferred to new units at HMS Excellent on Whale Island.

The former site, which was used for some time as a scrap yard, survives as a large area of derelict contaminated land and is highly visible from the M275 motorway at the gateway to Portsmouth. Several redevelopment plans have been proposed for visual improvements to the area, but none of them has so far progressed.
