= Portsea =

Portsea may refer to:

- Portsea, Victoria, a seaside town in Australia
- Portsea Island, an island on the south coast of England contained within the city of Portsmouth
- Portsea, Portsmouth, a parish and informal area of the city
