= A27 road =

Major road in southern England

A27

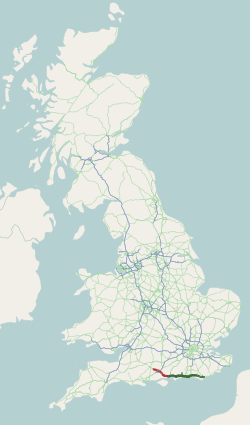

Major junctions
- West end: Whiteparish (near Salisbury, Wiltshire)
- A36; M3; A33; A32 M27 M275; A3 A3(M) A259; A29 A280; A24 A283; A23; A26; A22
- East end: Pevensey (near Bexhill, East Sussex)

Location
- Country: United Kingdom
- Primary destinations: Southampton; Fareham; Portsmouth; Chichester; Littlehampton; Worthing; Brighton and Hove; Lewes; Eastbourne

Road network
- Roads in the United Kingdom; Motorways; A and B road zones
← A26	→ A28

The A27 is a major road in southern England. It runs from its junction with the A36 at Whiteparish (near Salisbury) in the county of Wiltshire, follows the south coast of Hampshire and West Sussex, and terminates at Pevensey in East Sussex.

The section between Southampton and Portsmouth was superseded by the M27 motorway, but between Portsmouth and Lewes the A27 remains a trunk road serving the conurbations of South Hampshire, Chichester, Worthing / Brighton and Hove and Eastbourne.

It is the westernmost road in Zone 2 in the UK road numbering system.

== History ==
The original route underwent upgrades in the 20th century including the Sompting bypass in the 1930s and bypasses of Shoreham, Brighton and Lewes in the 1960s and 70s.

Historically, for longer distance movement along the south coast, the M25 in combination with the M2, M20, M23 / A23, A3 / A3(M) and M3 has provided an attractive alternative to the actual south coast route of A259, A27 and M27. In 2002 an offpeak journey between Margate and Southampton via the M25 took 2 hours 30 minutes, and via the coastal route using the A259, A27 and M27 took 3 hours 50 minutes. The reason the coastal route is so much slower than the M25 alternative is largely due to a series of bottlenecks on the A27. These include Chichester, Arundel, Worthing and Polegate.

The British government announced, in its 2013 spending review, that it would go ahead with improvements to the Chichester bypass. The Highways Agency said that the proposals would be subject to public consultation in July 2015. The preferred route would then be announced in September 2015 and the plan would be to start construction in February 2018 with a completion date of December 2019. However the timescales were then revised. There was a six-week public consultation period during Spring 2016. The proposed construction was to commence in March 2019 with a completion date of March 2021. After five options were published and then two removed the government cancelled the whole project on 28 February 2017, citing lack of support from local authorities as the main reason. Despite the A27 near Chichester being described as one of the most congested roads in England, the government in 2026 cancelled any improvements to the bottleneck, citing that there was no local consensus for the scheme.

A proposed scheme to bypass Lancing and Sompting (as well as other sections) was cancelled in 1988.

A proposed scheme to bypass Arundel was abandoned in 2003, although the junction at the end of the dual carriageway has been partly made into an underpass. However, the scheme was relaunched in Spring 2018 when Highways England announced their preferred route, choosing a "a modified version of Option 5A". Although the document claims 48% of respondents support this option, there are worries that the new road may damage ancient woodland in the South Downs National Park. With protests about the western end destroying an ancient woodland, Highways England consulted further in October 2019 and in October 2020 announced a new preferred route that is 8.8 kilometres (5.5 mi) long and avoids the South Downs National Park and ancient woodland entirely. Plans were deferred until 2025-2030, before being discontinued in 2025.

At Worthing, where the possibility of a bypass has often been discussed since 1967, even getting as far as passing the inspector's report at a public inquiry, the plan was dropped in 1996 following rising costs. Arundel and Worthing are both areas of known traffic congestion during times of peak usage. The proposed improvements for Worthing would have begun in 2025 and be completed by 2027, but the scheme was abandoned. (Note: RP – Road Period. RIS - Road Investment Strategy. * RP1 is the financial years 2015/16 to 2019/20 inclusive. * RP2 is 2020/21 to 2024/25. * RP3 will commence with 2025/26, which means it is planned to be constructed between 2025 & 2030: consultation should begin after 2023. * RIS3 - (The "Third Road Investment Strategy") includes 32 schemes, that the Highways Agency has identified by working closely with the Department for Transport (DfT), that will be developed as part of a pipeline of schemes that may be built in the third road investment period, which runs from 2025 to 2030.)

A bridge over the level crossing at Beddingham was completed on 22 August 2008. The original proposal called for a dual carriageway standard link with a bridge over the crossing. However, the actual project involved improving the original single carriageway road by providing two lanes westbound and one lane eastbound between the Southerham and Beddingham roundabouts.

Despite the limited improvements to the A27, it is still substantially quicker (usually more than an hour difference) to travel from Southampton to Margate via the M25 route compared to the coast route of A259, A27 and M27.

Because of all the delays along its route, according to West Sussex County Council, the A27 is the most unreliable all-purpose trunk road in England. Further, it is widely considered by businesses on the coast to cost money and inhibit economic performance due to its unreliability and frequent congestion. A recent survey describes the A27 around Chichester as the third worst 'A' road (at 275.2 Seconds per vehicle per mile) in the country for delay.

Highways England commissioned a report by Transport Focus to undertake road user priorities. The South Central route, that is largely the A27, was one of the lower rated routes with 50% of users experiencing problems. Out of a list of strategic routes across the whole of England only two were rated worse than the South Central route: the M25 to Solent route (61%) and the London Orbital and M23 to Gatwick (58%). Further Highways England identified the A27 between Lancing and the A24; between Arundel and the A284; between the A23 and Polegate; also around Chichester as being some of worst performing links in the country for safety issues.

There are several sections of the A27 that fall inside the Highways Agency nationwide top 250 collision rankings:

- A27 between Shoreham-by-Sea and Southwick – ranking 123
- A27/A23 junction Brighton – ranking 158
- A27 near the junction with the A2025 near Lancing – ranking 158
- A27 Chichester By-Pass east of the city – ranking 202

== Serious incidents ==
=== Shoreham Airshow crash ===
At the Shoreham Airshow on 22 August 2015, a Hawker Hunter crashed onto the A27 at Lancing, striking several vehicles and killing eleven people. The road was completely closed for eight days and did not fully reopen until 16 September 2015.

=== Flooding ===
In November 2022, during the outbreak of flooding, the road near Chichester, Emsworth and Havant was extensively covered with floodwater. 20 cars were trapped on this section of the road.

== Description ==
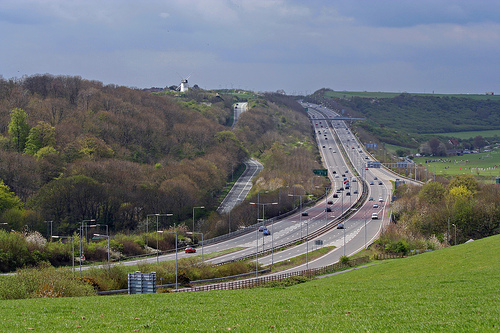
A27 near Brighton and Hove, East Sussex

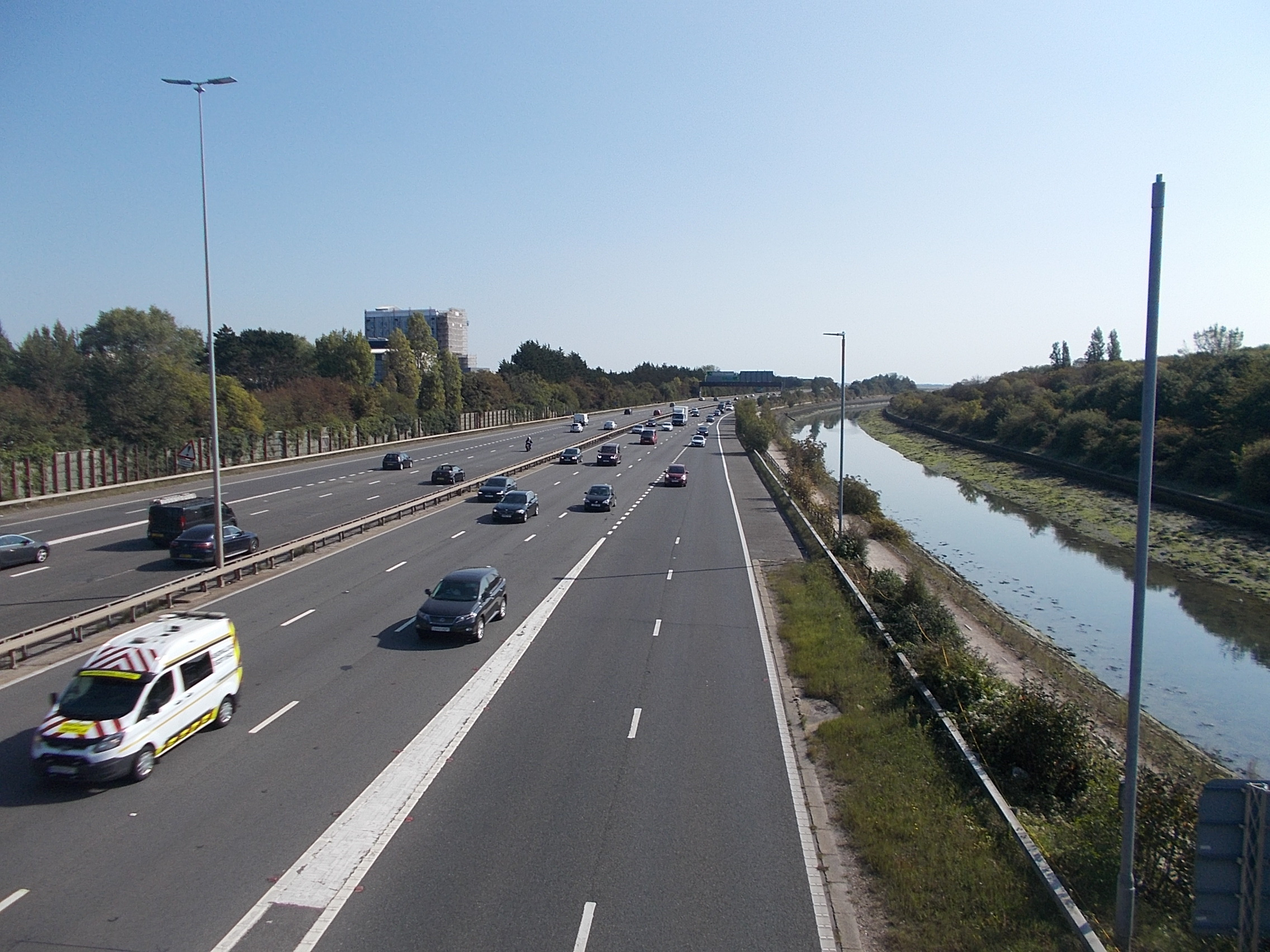
A27 north of Portsmouth, at its junction with the M27

The road starts at its junction with the A36 at Whiteparish. It runs through Romsey, Chilworth, at which point it follows a Roman Road, Swaythling, West End and Bursledon. It then closely parallels the south coast and travels on via Fareham, Cosham, Havant, Chichester, Arundel, Worthing, Lancing, Shoreham-by-Sea, Hove, Brighton, Falmer, Lewes and Polegate where it then terminates at Pevensey in East Sussex.

A section of the A27 running from the eastern end of the M27 to the end of the road at Pevensey forms part of, what was known as, the South Coast Trunk Road. Much of the road has been improved to dual carriageway standard, with the westernmost section of the trunk portion even having as much as four lanes plus a hard shoulder in each direction, and on a motorway alignment with grade-separated junctions. This is perhaps a reflection that the M27 was once proposed to run as far as Chichester.

The road runs east from Portsmouth to Havant then on to the Warblington/ Emsworth exit. Beyond Warblington the dual carriageway east has no junctions in it until it reaches Chichester, where the by-pass has five roundabouts and one traffic signal controlled junction, that disrupt the mainline flow of the road. The Chichester by-pass is regularly subject to congestion and although a public inquiry has proposed improvements the whole project has been cancelled.

East of Chichester the road largely retains a two-lane dual-carriageway standard. There are, however a couple of sections of single-carriageway; at Arundel and at Worthing. These are both areas of known traffic congestion during times of peak usage.

At the junction of the A27 and the A24, the A27 has a brief section where the road is designated 'A27' and 'A24' before continuing from the 'Grove Lodge' roundabout where the road is named "Upper Brighton Road". After Worthing, the A27 passes Sompting on the Sompting Bypass before passing through Lancing where there are traffic lights and a roundabout which disrupt traffic flow. Just before the road crosses the River Adur near Shoreham via the 'Shoreham flyover' (constructed 1968-70), there is a traffic light-controlled intersection close to Lancing College and the headquarters of Ricardo plc which was the scene of the multiple-fatality Shoreham Airshow crash in 2015. After the 'flyover' over the Adur, the A27 then runs past the Holmbush interchange (Shoreham-by-Sea) and on through the Southwick Hill Tunnel, at that point entering the City of Brighton and Hove, traditionally (though no longer administratively) part of East Sussex.

Later, it passes Brighton — where it is known as the Brighton Bypass — and around the South Downs. The junction of the A23 and the A27 is often slow in the morning rush hour.

It then passes around Falmer with this section of road having three lanes in each direction but loses the third lane later. When Brighton and Hove Albion play at home this section can become congested due to its proximity to Falmer Stadium. The road passes into East Sussex proper just to the west of the Falmer junction.

Afterwards, it passes south of Lewes where it meets the A26 road to Newhaven.

Here, the road becomes a single carriageway standard and formerly crossed a level crossing until it was bypassed by a bridge which opened in 2008. The South Coast Multi-Modal Study (SoCoMMS) recommended a dual carriageway, but the Highways Agency built it to a cheaper single-carriageway standard. Plans are still proposed for upgrading this later.

The road afterwards reverts to a dual carriageway with access to the A22, which provides links to Eastbourne and Hailsham.

The road then once again becomes a single carriageway near Pevensey, where the road ends, and the South Coast Trunk Road transfers over to the A259; this coast road starts in Emsworth and shadows the route of the A27.

=== Bexhill to Hastings link road ===
Work on the contentious Bexhill to Hastings link road commenced in early 2013 and was completed in late 2015. The road provides a more direct link from the A27 to the A28 road via the A259 road.

=== Landmarks on the route ===
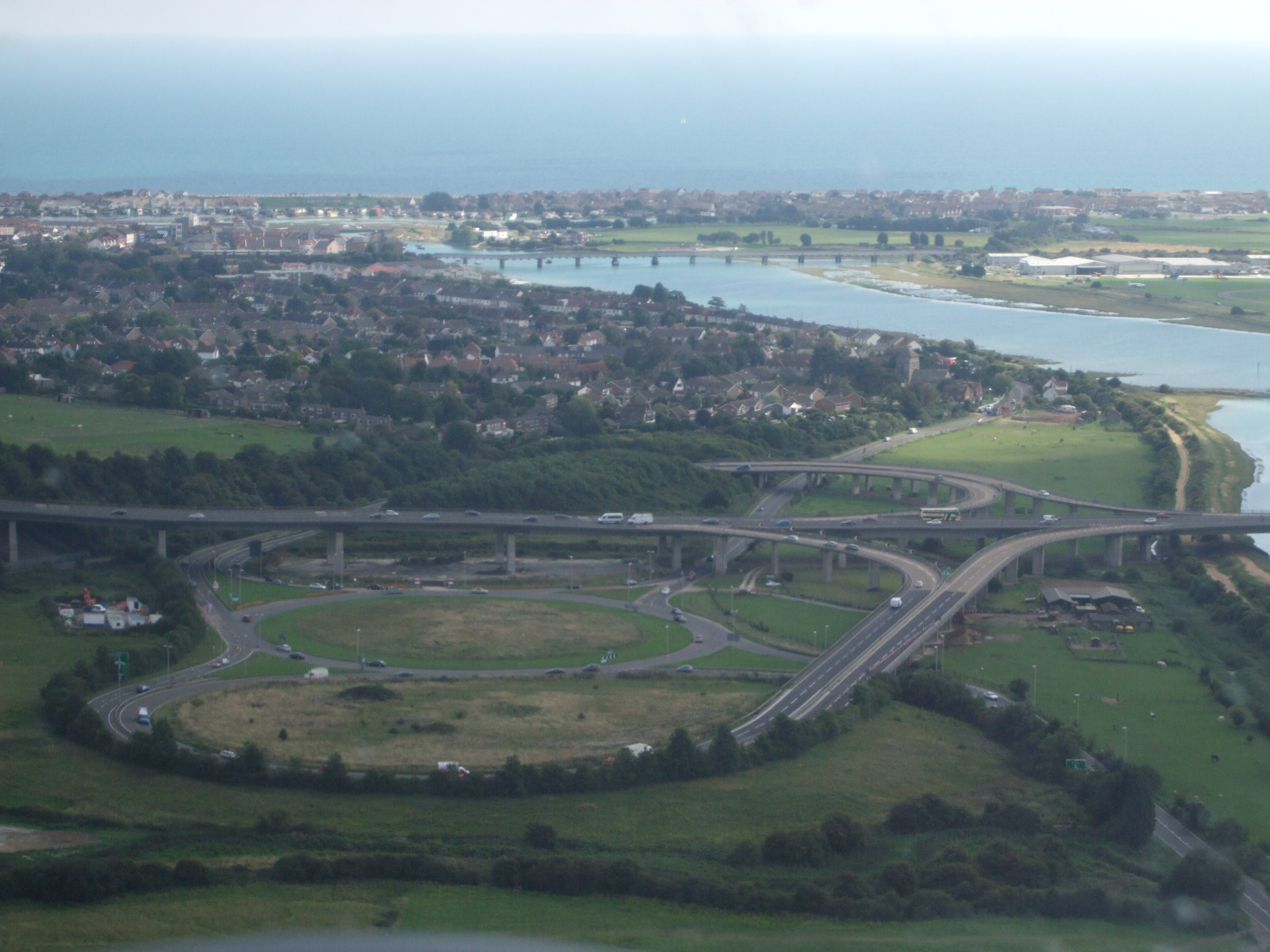
A27 eastern approach to flyover of River Adur, near Shoreham, West Sussex

- Spinnaker Tower
- Chichester Cathedral
- Arundel Cathedral
- Arundel Castle
- The South Downs
- Shoreham Airport
- River Adur
- Lancing College
- University of Sussex
- Lewes Castle
- Mount Caburn
- Firle Beacon
- Long Man of Wilmington
- Falmer Stadium

== Proposed developments ==
National Highways state on their website that the A27 is the only east–west trunk road south of the M25 and it serves a population of more than 750,000 people along the south coast. They also say that safety is a problem along the A27 with many accidents and incidents along its length. To improve its safety and serviceability they intend to make improvements to the road. This includes:

- Arundel Bypass – Plans were originally deferred until 2025-2030, but have now been cancelled.
- Worthing & Lancing Improvements – Improvements to junctions in the urban areas of Worthing and Lancing to increase capacity and improve safety. Proposed improvements would have begun in 2025 and be completed by 2027, but have been cancelled by the government.
- Chichester Bypass – The present plan is to mitigate existing problems by improving the junctions on the current Chichester bypass. Improvements will be dependent on government funding.

== Junctions ==
County	Location	mi	km	Coord	Destinations	Notes
Wiltshire	—	0	0	(Note: 51.0123°N 1.6809°W)	A36 - Southampton, Salisbury	
Hampshire	Romsey	8.5	13.7	(Note: 50.9834°N 1.5060°W)	A3090 - Bournemouth, Ringwood, Southampton, Ower, Cadnam, Romsey, Winchester	
Hampshire	Romsey	9.3	15.0	(Note: 50.9880°N 1.4895°W)	A3090 - Winchester, Stockbridge	
Hampshire	—	10.3	16.6	(Note: 50.9761°N 1.4809°W)	A3057 - Southampton, Nursling, Rownhams, Lordshill	
Hampshire	Southampton	15.1	24.3	(Note: 50.9524°N 1.4039°W)	A33 - Southampton M3 - London, Eastleigh, Winchester	
Hampshire	Southampton	16.6	26.7	(Note: 50.9423°N 1.3758°W)	A335 - Eastleigh, Southampton	Detour along Stoneham lane and the A335 is required to continue along the A27
Hampshire	Southampton	19.9	32.1	(Note: 50.9143°N 1.3277°W)	A334 - Southampton, Bitterne, Botley, Hedge End	
Hampshire	Southampton	21.2	34.2	(Note: 50.8963°N 1.3191°W)	A3024 - Portsmouth, Southampton, Bitterne A3025 - Woolston	
Hampshire	Park Gate	24.5	39.4	(Note: 50.8706°N 1.2646°W)	A3051 - Botley	
Hampshire	Park Gate	24.8	39.9	(Note: 50.8690°N 1.2547°W)	A27 - Fareham, Titchfield, Warsash	Road splits into two branches
Hampshire	Park Gate	North branch				
Hampshire	Park Gate	25.2	40.6	(Note: 50.8744°N 1.2525°W)	M27 - Southampton, Winchester, Portsmouth, Fareham	
Hampshire	Park Gate	South branch				
Hampshire	Fareham	29.1	46.8	(Note: 50.8505°N 1.1774°W)	A32 - Gosport	
Hampshire	Fareham	29.7	47.3	(Note: 50.8532°N 1.1675°W)	A32 - Alton, Wickham	Road splits into two branches
Hampshire	Fareham	North branch				
Hampshire	Fareham	30.3	48.3	(Note: 50.8600°N 1.1576°W)	M27 - Southampton, Alton, Portsmouth, Brighton	
Hampshire	Fareham	East branch				
Hampshire	Portsmouth	33.3	53.1	(Note: 50.8459°N 1.0881°W)	M27 - Portsmouth, Southampton A3 - Cosham, Paulsgrove, Waterlooville	
Hampshire	Portsmouth	34.3	54.6	(Note: 50.8375°N 1.0728°W)	M27 - Portsmouth, Southampton, Fareham A3 - Hilsea A397 - Cosham, Waterlooville	no access from M27 to A27 going west and vice versa
Hampshire	Portsmouth	35.6	57.3	(Note: 50.8347°N 1.0433°W)	A2030 - Farlington, Drayton, Portsmouth, Southsea, Fratton, Hilsea	
1.000 mi = 1.609 km; 1.000 km = 0.621 mi: Incomplete access

*Ceremonial Counties

Coordinate list
