= Thomas Atkinson (Royal Navy officer) =

Warrant officer in the Royal Navy

- Born: 1767; Yorkshire
- Died: 1836 (aged 68–69)
- Burial place: St Andrew's churchyard in Farlington
- Military career
- Allegiance: United Kingdom
- Branch: Royal Navy
- Service years: 1793 - ?
- Rank: Master
- Units: HMS Emerald; HMS Theseus; HMS San Josef; HMS St George; HMS Victory

Thomas Atkinson (1767-1836) was a warrant officer in the Royal Navy who served as master under Nelson and became one of the admiral's favoured followers. Nelson clearly thought highly of Atkinson, describing him as "One of the best Masters I have seen in the Royal Navy".

== Early career and promotion to master ==
Born in Yorkshire in 1767, Atkinson joined the Royal Navy as a volunteer in 1793. Virtually nothing is known of him before this date but as he was immediately rated as an able seaman it is almost certain that he was already an experienced mariner. He was promoted to master two years later and joined HMS Emerald, a 36-gun frigate. In the spring of 1797 he transferred to HMS Theseus which soon after became Nelson's flagship. It was here Atkinson first came to the admiral's attention, serving under him during the unsuccessful expedition of 1797 against Santa Cruz de Tenerife.

== HMS Theseus and the Battle of the Nile ==
While serving on board Theseus, Atkinson also saw action at Aboukir Bay in 1798 and Acre in 1799, when he was wounded in an explosion that damaged the ship and killed the captain, Ralph Miller. Atkinson was mentioned by Sir Sidney Smith in despatches, later published in the London Gazette, for his bravery in having contributed to the success of the battle and, along with other officers, saving the ship after Captain Miller was killed.

== Service under Nelson ==
In 1801, Atkinson joined Nelson's new flagship, HMS San Josef, and began an almost uninterrupted spell of service under the admiral. During the first Baltic campaign (1801), when Nelson transferred his flag to HMS St George, Atkinson went with him and was one of those who marked out the treacherous shoals around Copenhagen prior to the battle. This action gained him his first testimonial from Nelson who also became godfather to one of Atkinson's sons.

=== HMS Victory and Trafalgar ===
When war again broke out in 1803, Nelson wrote to Atkinson personally asking him to serve as master in HMS Victory. They served together until Nelson's death at the Battle of Trafalgar in 1805. At Nelson's funeral in 1806 Atkinson was present in the third barge. He was the only non-commissioned officer to be given that honour. Atkinson also accompanied the funeral car during the procession. A diagram was published in the London Gazette.

== Later service ==
After Trafalgar, Atkinson served ashore in various naval dockyards, ending his career at Portsmouth as "first master attendant". He died in 1836 and was buried at St Andrew's churchyard in Farlington, Portsmouth, along with other members of his immediate family.

Thomas Atkinson's obituary highlighted that "...the promotions and rewards he obtained were solely the result of his own persevering exertions".
