= Andy Perry =

English rugby union footballer

- Born: Andy Perry; 28 December 1974 (age 51) Portsmouth, Hampshire, England
- Height: 6 ft 5 in (1.96 m)
- Weight: 19 st 1 lb (121 kg)
- School: Springfield School

Rugby union career
- Position: Lock
- Current team: London Irish
Senior career
Years	Team	Apps	(Points)
- Devonport Services
- Bridgwater
- Exeter
? - 2005	Plymouth Albion		
2005 -	Newcastle Falcons	67	(0)

Andy Perry (born 28 December 1974 in Portsmouth, Hampshire, England) is a rugby union player for Newcastle Falcons in the Guinness Premiership, playing primarily as a lock.

He has previously played for Exeter and Plymouth Albion. He is a former Royal Marine and has also played for Devonport Services and Bridgwater.

== Military service ==
At age 17, Perry abruptly decided to join the Royal Marines, where he served for 12 years. During his time in the Royal Marines Perry was deployed to Oman, Hong Kong, the Persian Gulf, and Northern Ireland.

== Rugby career ==
On 21 July 2009, he signed for London Irish on a one-year deal.
