= Springfield School, Portsmouth =

Springfield School
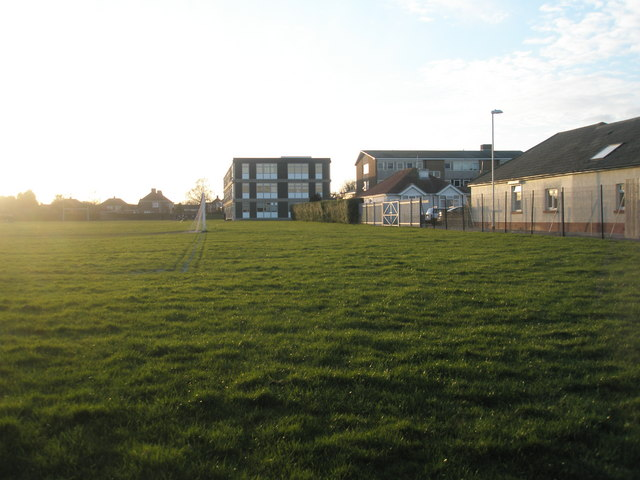

Location
- Central Road; Drayton; Portsmouth, Hampshire, PO6 1QY; England; 50.8430°N 1.0473°W

Information
- Type: Academy
- Local authority: Portsmouth City Council
- Trust: The De Curci Trust
- Department for Education URN: 144192 Tables
- Ofsted: Reports
- Headteacher: Sara Spivey
- Gender: Co-educational
- Age: 11 to 16
- Website: http://www.springfield.uk.net/

Springfield School is a co-educational secondary school located in the Drayton area of Portsmouth in the English county of Hampshire.

It was previously a community school administered by Portsmouth City Council, and held specialist Technology College status. In April 2017 Springfield School converted to academy status and is now sponsored by The De Curci Trust.

== Notable former pupils ==
- Andy Perry, rugby union player
- Katy Sexton, swimmer
