= A2030 road =

Road in England

A2030

Major junctions
- North end: Bedhampton; 50.8496°N 1.0133°W
- A3(M); A27; A3
- South end: Portsmouth; 50.7956°N 1.0940°W

Location
- Country: United Kingdom
- Constituent country: England

Road network
- Roads in the United Kingdom; Motorways; A and B road zones

The A2030 is a road in Hampshire. The road starts off at junction 5 of the A3(M), near the village of Bedhampton. The road then runs west along the base of Portsdown Hill, following the old route of the A27 into Portsmouth until it reaches the Drayton area.

== Route ==
It then turns sharply south directly between Drayton and Farlington, and begins to run down towards the main areas of Portsmouth on Portsea Island. Just before crossing onto Portsea Island is a busy junction with the current A27.

From here it winds its way across Portsmouth, changing names a number of times, before terminating at a junction with the A3 in Portsmouth City centre.

Being one of only three roads between Portsea Island and the mainland, it is always busy and often becomes congested during rush hours.

== See also ==
- Great Britain road numbering system
