= Farlington Halt railway station =

Former railway station in England

Coordinates: 50.8381°N 1.0461°W

Farlington Halt

General information
- Location: Drayton, City of Portsmouth; England

Other information
- Status: Disused

History
- Opened: 26 June 1891; 134 years ago
- Closed: 4 July 1937; 88 years ago
- Original company: London, Brighton and South Coast Railway
- Pre-grouping: London, Brighton and South Coast Railway
- Post-grouping: Southern Railway
Location

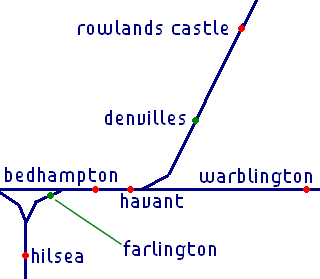
The location of the disused Farlington station. (Note: the other disused station: Havant New, labelled here as Denvilles)

Farlington Halt railway station was a disused station between Bedhampton and Hilsea, located immediately to the west of Farlington Junction on the Portsmouth Direct Line railway.

The station was originally built to serve Portsmouth Park racecourse, opening as Farlington Race Course on 26 June 1891. On 23 July 1894, it was the scene of a train crash when a brake van next to the engine hauling the 6.35pm from Havant derailed and the first two coaches overturned. The guard on the train was killed and seven passengers were injured, one of whom seriously.

The racecourse was closed during World War One, but the station was retained to serve the ammunition dump put in its place. The station closed in 1917. Re-opened in 1922 until 1927. Under the Southern Railway, it re-opened as a general public halt in 1928 named Farlington Halt; however, this was short-lived as the station closed due to insufficient customers on 4 July 1937.

When the A2030 Eastern Road was built through the old racecourse site and Drayton Marshes during World War II, piles were driven through the platforms, rendering it unusable thereafter. The road next to the old station site in Drayton still retains the name Station Road and a footbridge over the railway to the Railway Triangle Industrial Estate was in use for many years, but is now closed behind fences.

== Future use ==
According to the long-term plans on the website of Portsmouth City Council, there are plans to build a new Farlington station approximately 500 yards east of the old site near the local Sainsburys and B&M.
