= Tipner Lake =

Part of Portsmouth Harbour, Hampshire, England

Coordinates: 50.8316°N 1.0842°W

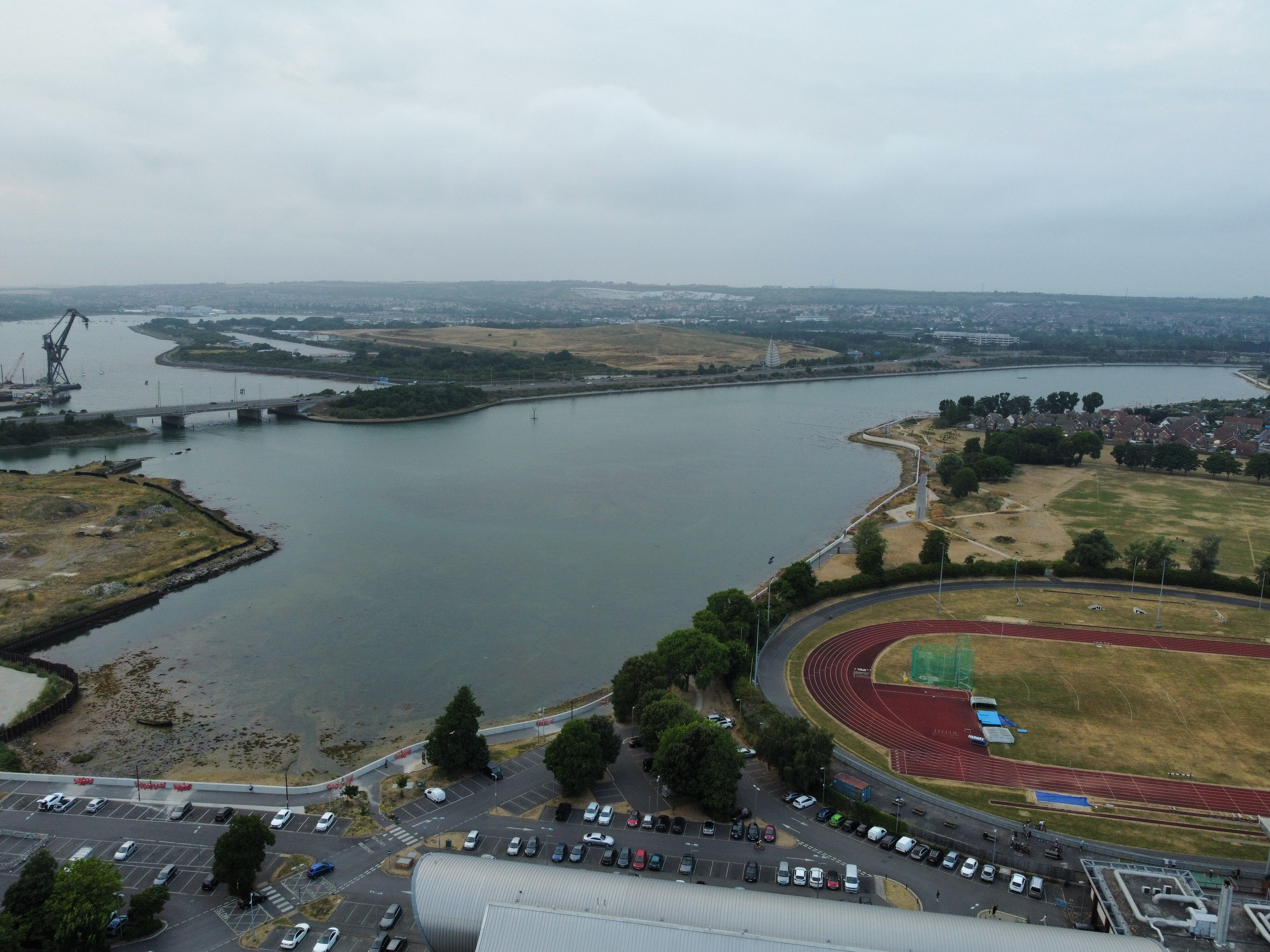
Tipner Lake viewed from above and to the south

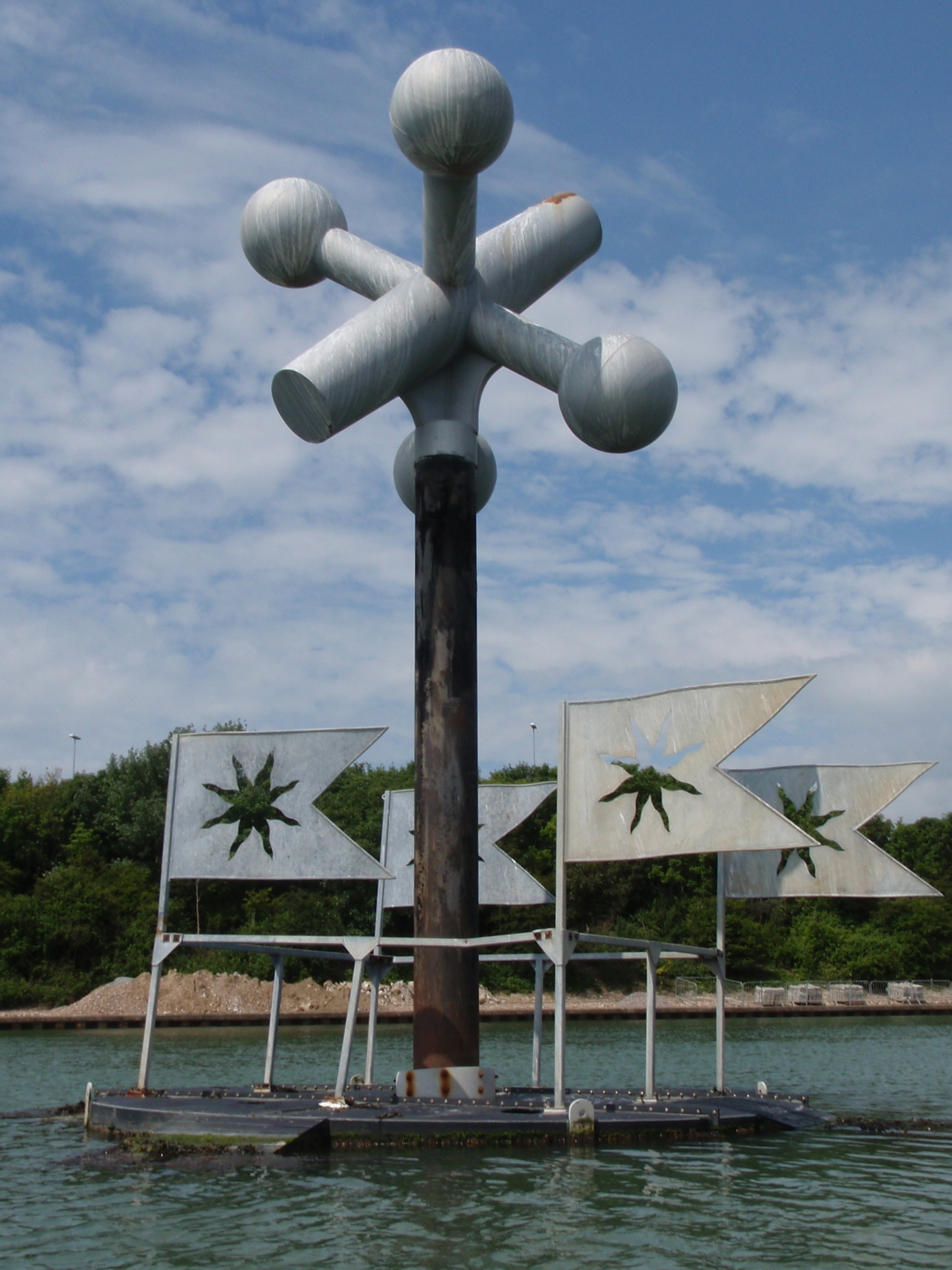
The Jack Star sculpture

Tipner Lake forms the north eastern section of Portsmouth Harbour. It is not an actual lake, but the reclamation of land north of Horsea Island and the building of the M275 motorway in the early 1970s, which passes over a bridge to the west of the lake, can give the impression the body of water is no longer connected to the harbour. The lake is also connected to Portsbridge Creek.

Much of the lake is a site of special scientific interest as well as being a Ramsar wetland of international importance. The site also falls within the Portsmouth Harbour special protection area.

Moves to reclaim the land to provide extra space for the expansion of Portsmouth were rejected in the early 1990s on environmental grounds.

The lake is home to the Richard Farrington "Jack Star" sculpture which was installed in late 2000.
