= Portsea Island =

Island off the southern coast of Hampshire, England

Portsea
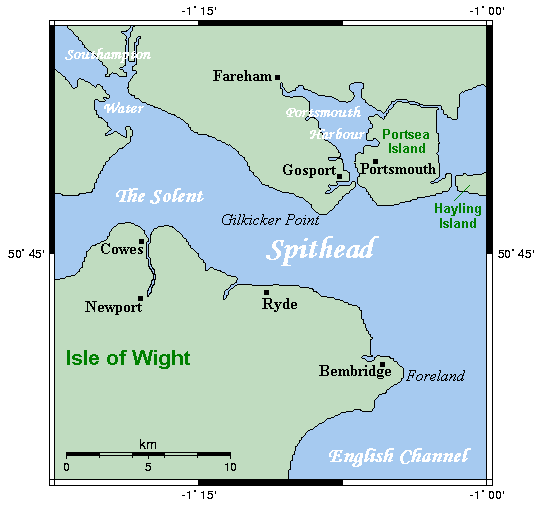
- Closeup map of Portsea Island

- Location within Hampshire

Geography
- Location: Solent
- Coordinates: 50.81°N 1.07°W
- Area: 24.542 km^{2} (9.476 sq mi)

Administration
- England
- County: Hampshire
- City: Portsmouth

Demographics
- Population: 165,248 (2021)

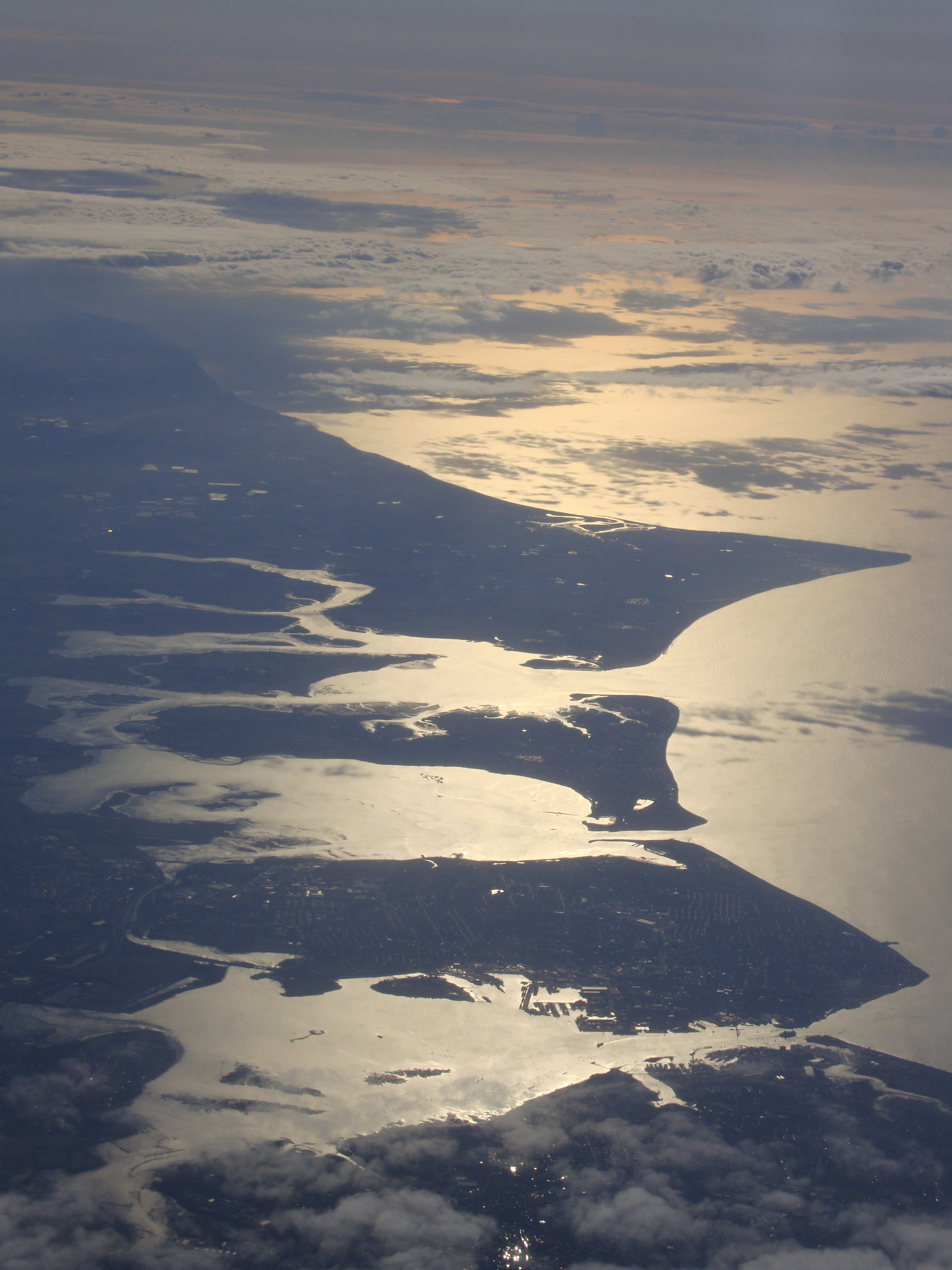
Portsea Island from the west (north to the left), from the air (beneath neighbouring Hayling Island)

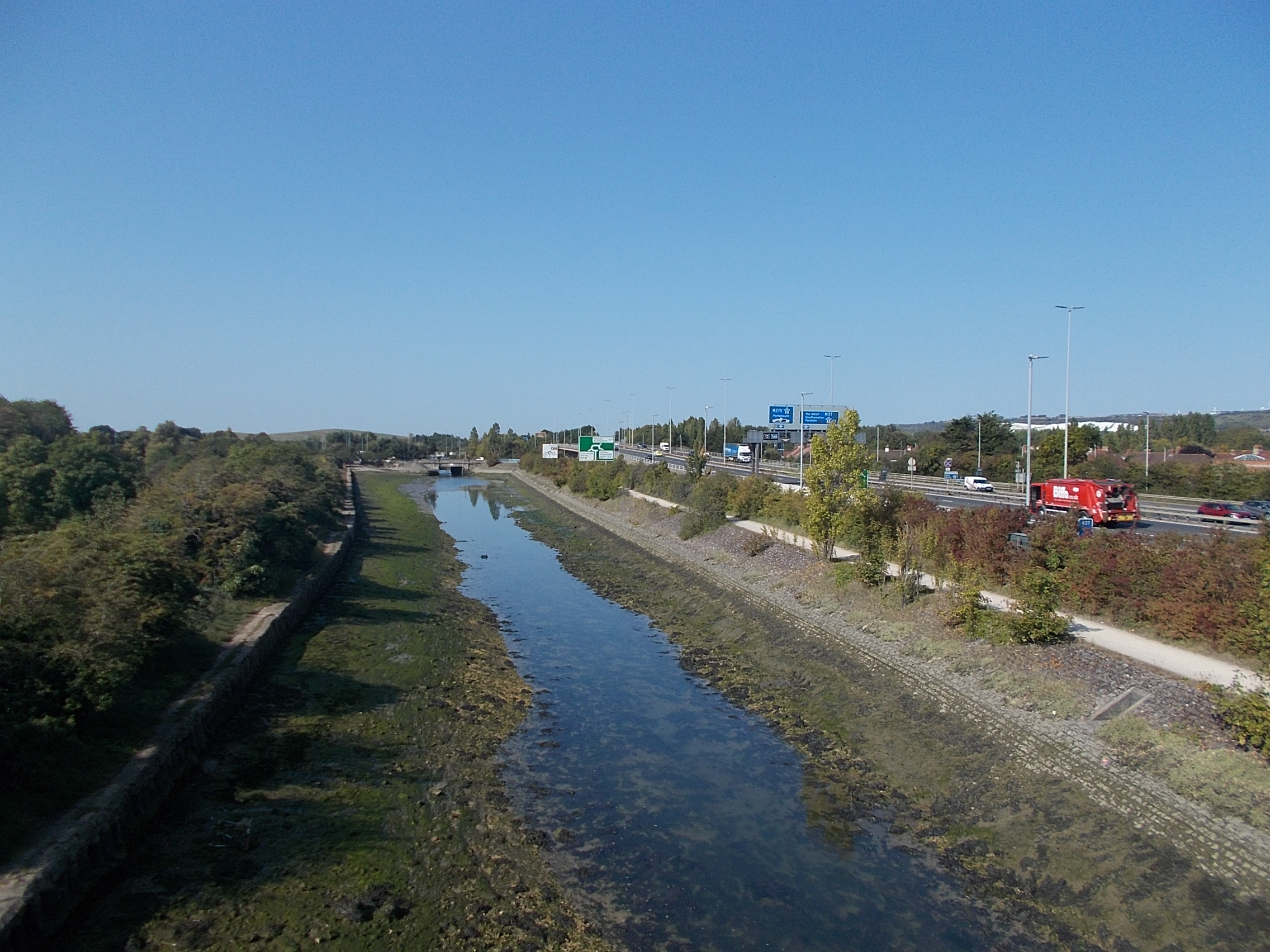
Portsea Island (left), separated from the mainland (right) by the narrow, tidal Portsea Creek

Portsea Island is a flat and low-lying natural island 24.5 square kilometres (9.5 sq mi; 6,100 acres) in area, just off the southern coast of Hampshire in England. The island contains the majority of the city of Portsmouth.

Portsea Island has the third-largest population of all the islands in the British Isles after the mainlands of Great Britain and Ireland; it also has the highest population density of any British Isle, and Portsmouth has the highest population density of any city in the UK, excluding the ceremonial county of Greater London which does not have official city status.

To the east of Portsea Island lies Hayling Island, separated by Langstone Harbour. To the west is the peninsular mainland town of Gosport, separated by Portsmouth Harbour. To the south, it faces into the Spithead area of the wider Solent. A narrow tidal channel along the northern edge of Portsea Island, known as Portsea Creek, separates Portsea Island from the mainland.

Three roads connect Portsea Island to the mainland road network: the M275 motorway, the A3 London Road (split on two separate bridges), and the A2030 Eastern Road. There are also two pedestrian and bicycle bridges over Portsea Creek. In Portsmouth Harbour, a road bridge connects Portsea Island to Whale Island, a restricted Royal Navy shore base establishment.

Portsea Island has four railway stations (Portsmouth Harbour, Portsmouth & Southsea, Fratton and Hilsea) connected by an island branch line to the mainland railway network via a short railway bridge over Portsea Creek. In addition there are ferry services to Gosport (on the mainland), Hayling Island and the Isle of Wight. There are also ferries to the Channel Islands, northern France and northern Spain.

== Etymology ==
Portsea's name is derived from the Latin word portus, meaning 'harbour' and the Saxon word ēġ (pronounced /i͜yːj/, 'ee'), or ea (also pronounced 'ee') meaning 'island'. Portsea Island was previously named with a Latin–Saxon Portus eg (or Portuseg) name (alternatively Portus ea or Portusea). Local people began adding the additional Island noun after the Portuseg (or Portusea) name in later times after the Saxon ēġ and ea meaning had become lost.

== History ==
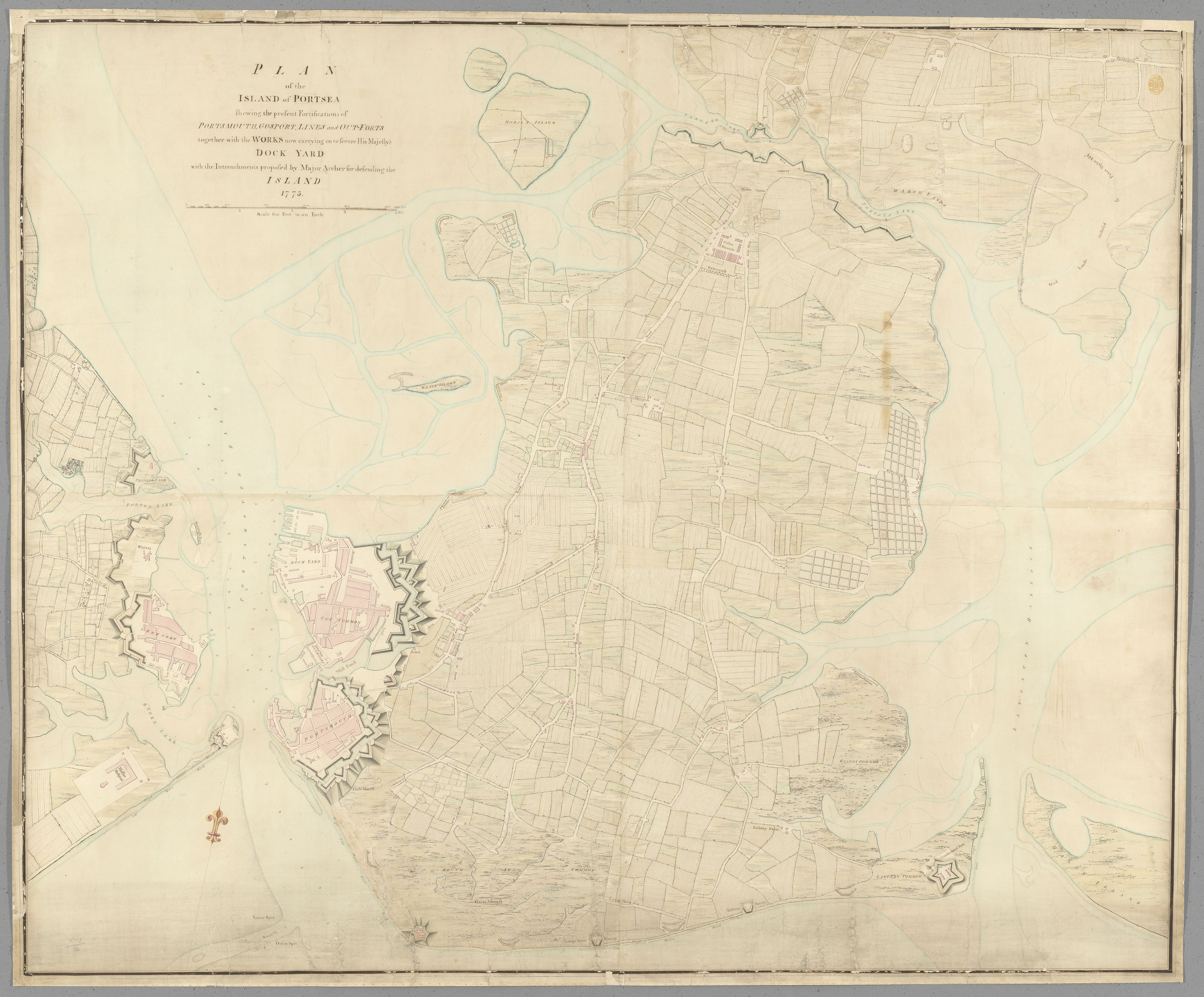
Map of the Island of Portsea, dated 1773

Two Bronze Age hoards and a hoard of Roman coins have been found on the island. In 979 AD the island was raided by Danes. At the time of the Domesday Book, three manors were recorded as being on the island.

== Localities (A–Z) ==
=== Baffins ===
Adjoining the eastern green belt, this extends into the heart of the Baffins neighbourhood which has a large pond and the grounds of Portsmouth College.

=== Buckland ===
Buckland is a central neighbourhood at the heart of the island, directly north of Kingston and north-east of Landport.

=== Copnor ===
Copnor is an area on the eastern side of Portsea Island. As Copenore, it was one of the three villages listed as being on Portsea Island in the Domesday book.

In the late 19th and early 20th century the rapid expansion of Portsmouth saw the original village engulfed. The west of the district is now a predominantly residential area of 1930s housing, while the east is an industrial and commercial area.

It was originally intended to have a railway station, which would be the intermediate station between Havant and Portsmouth Town stations when the line opened. However, this never materialised, in spite of the large gap between stations, and the existence of a signalled level crossing for many years (now a bridge). A "Station Road" was laid out, and still exists, however construction on the station never began.

=== Eastney ===
Fronting the beach along the southern shore is the promenade road of Eastney, which is punctuated by three forts: small Eastney Fort West (dismantled); Eastney Fort East; and large Fort Cumberland, which occupies a modest peninsula. Eastney is the most south-eastern area of Portsea Island and forms part of the entrance into Langstone Harbour. Eastney offers a marina (confusingly named as "Southsea Marina") and a foot-passenger ferry service across Langstone Harbour to neighbouring Hayling Island.

Eastney Lake, a natural tidal inlet of Langstone Harbour is located on the northern side of the Eastney peninsula, with Milton on the opposite northern side of Eastney Lake. A small enclosed lagoon nicknamed 'The Glory Hole' is located on the southern side of Eastney Lake, and is refilled with Langstone Harbour's salt-water on high spring tides. Eastney Lake is also known by locals as 'Eastney Creek' or 'The Creek'.

=== Fratton ===
Fratton is a residential and light industrial area of Portsmouth. It consists mostly of Victorian terraced houses, and is typical of the residential areas in the city. There is also a modest shopping centre on Fratton Road, The Bridge Centre, built on the site of a large former Co-op department store, now dominated by a large Asda supermarket, which reflects the working-class naval and industrial heritage of the Fratton district, with localised rather than centralised low-budget shops and cafés.

Fratton railway station is one of four stations remaining on Portsea Island and forms part of the Portsmouth Direct line. To the east of Fratton railway station there is Fratton Traincare Depot, a train maintenance depot. The large former Fratton railway goods yard was cleared in the late 1990s and early 2000s, making way for a retail park.

=== Hilsea ===
Hilsea is the north-western district of the city, with a mixture of residential and industrial/retail/distribution areas. It is home to one of Portsmouth's main sports and leisure facilities, the Mountbatten Centre and Trafalgar School. Among its small green belt to the north and west is Portsmouth rugby football club.

Anchorage Park is a 1980s housing development which occupies the north-eastern portion of Hilsea. Anchorage Park was formerly the location of Portsmouth Airport, Hilsea which was closed in 1973.

=== Kingston ===
This small central, typical, terraced district of the city has a few high-rise developments and is entirely residential.

=== Landport ===
Residential parts of Landport are separated from its trade and distribution premises alongside its Albert Johnson Quay by the M275/A3 where the roads change designation. In the westernmost street of this residential side is a large old listed horse trough and row of listed four homes, the Charles Dickens Birthplace Museum in his birthplace home, and Mile End Chapel (a studio). A section of the original main Portsmouth to London A3 road between Commercial Road, Landport and Kingston Crescent is locally known as Mile End Road area. Landport is also home to the former Mile End House School, which was a boys' preparatory school founded by George Lewin Oliver, who later became a founding director of Portsmouth Football Club on 5 April 1898 and club chairman on 27 July 1912.

=== Mile End ===
See Landport

Mile End began as a small 18th century settlement built on the London to Portsmouth A3 road, a mile to the north of the main Landport Gate entrance to the walled town of Portsmouth (now Old Portsmouth). Mile End was consumed within the rapid urban development of the growing Landport and Buckland areas during the 19th and 20th centuries. Much like neighbouring Rudmore, Mile End's proximity to Portsmouth's naval dockyard during World War II caused extensive damage and redevelopment of the Mile End area post-war.

However, remnants of old Mile End still survive to the present day along a narrow area of Portsea Island's west shoreline; Mile End Road is the official name of a section of the A3 road to the north of Commercial Road which extends northwards through Mile End (alongside the M275 motorway) towards the Rudmore Roundabout intersection with Kingston Crescent in North End. To the west of Mile End Road is the Mile End Industrial Estate.

Novelist Charles Dickens was born at 1 Mile End Terrace, Mile End on 7 February 1812, which has since been renamed 393 Old Commercial Road, Landport.

=== Milton ===
Milton is a suburban residential district of the city of Portsmouth with two large public parks, named Milton Park and Bransbury Park, which were both once farms. Milton is located on the south eastern side of Portsea Island and is bordered on the east by Langstone Harbour. Eastney lies to the south, Southsea to the south west, Baffins to the north and Fratton to the west. Milton was originally a small farming village on Portsea Island, surrounded by farmland until it was swallowed up by city expansion in the early years of the 20th century. Portsmouth Football Club's Fratton Park stadium, despite its name, was built on land purchased from Milton Farm and is still located in the Milton Ward area of Portsmouth, south of the city's railway line, the boundary of the neighbouring Fratton Ward area.

=== North End ===
North End is a mainly residential area to the centre-north of the island. Its name reflects its origin as a northern expansion of the (then) village of Kingston, forming the "northern end" of Kingston. North End is built on land which was formerly Stubbington Farm, part of which retains the street name of Stubbington Avenue.

=== Old Portsmouth ===
Old Portsmouth lies on the south west corner of Portsea Island and forms the eastern side of the narrow entrance to Portsmouth Harbour at the port's mouth. Old Portsmouth contains most of the traditional High Street and heritage of the original old town of Portsmouth, including Portsmouth Point (also known as "Spice Island") and the Camber Dock. Landport Gate, the 1760 main entrance gateway to the old walled town of Portsmouth, still stands in its original location, on what is now St George's Road in Old Portsmouth. The main London to Portsmouth A3 road ran northwards from Landport Gate, which created the settlement of Landport just to the north of Old Portsmouth. A mile north from Landport Gate also gave rise to the Mile End settlement and the Mile End Road name.

=== Portsea ===
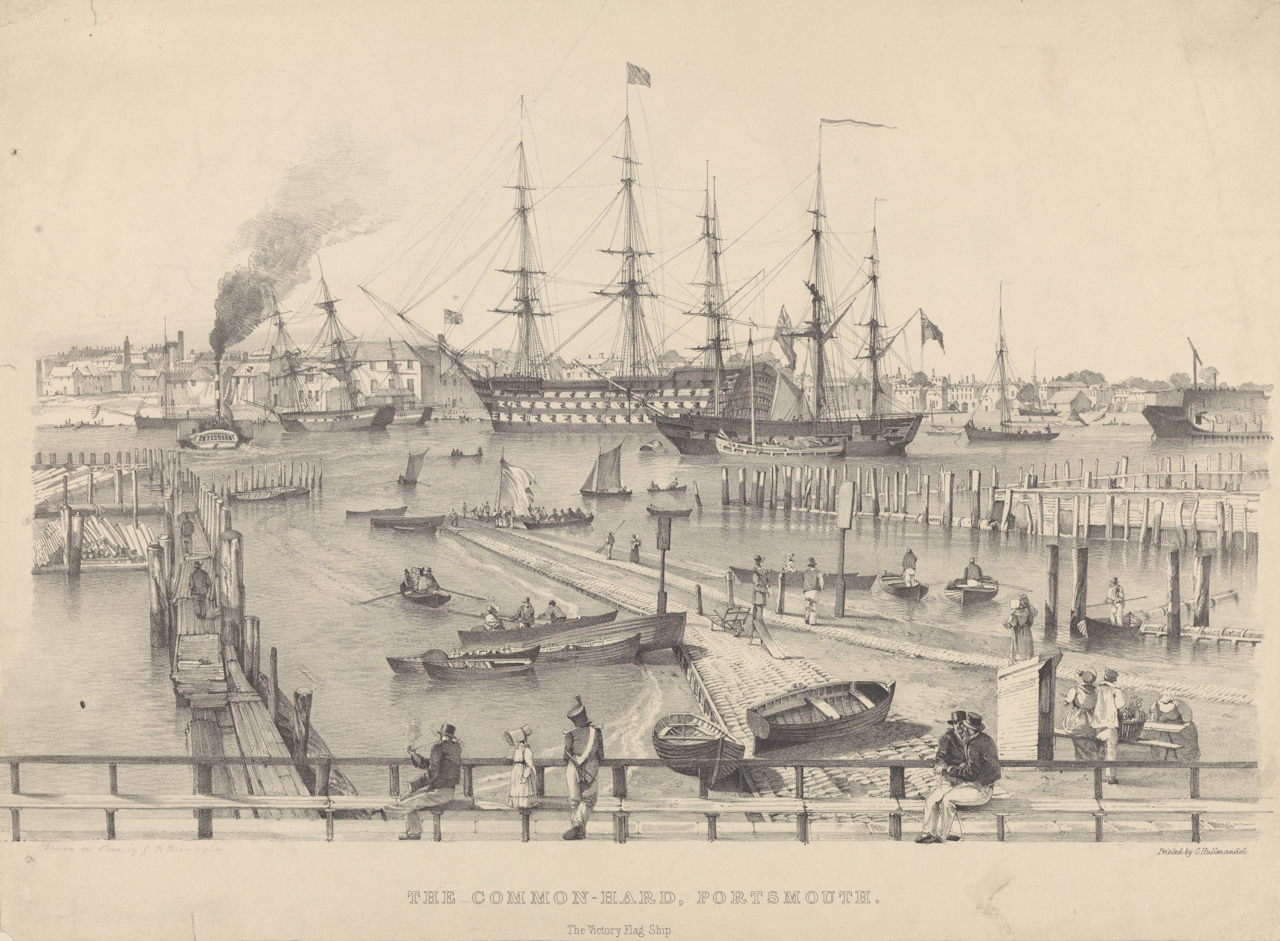
The Common-Hard, Portsmouth, 1834. The Victory in harbour

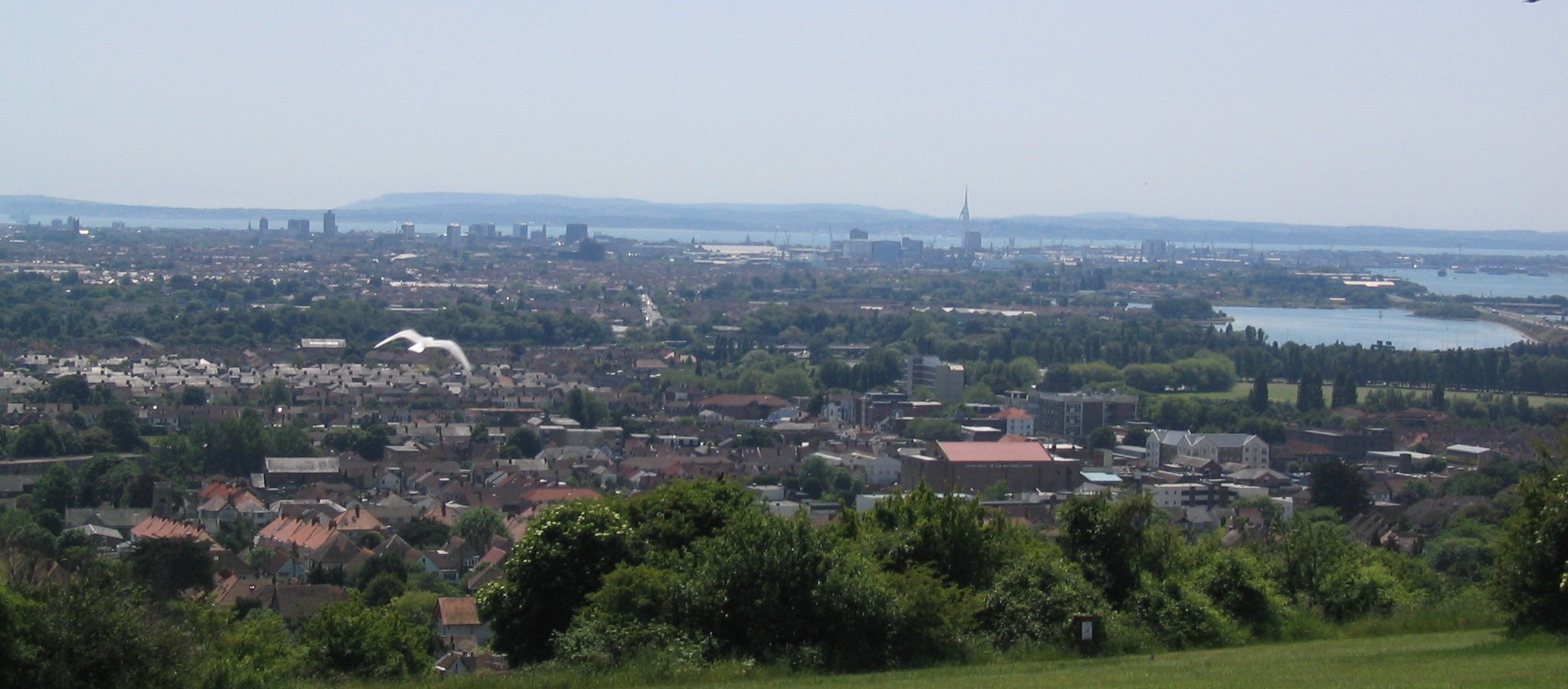
View of Portsmouth and Portsea Island from Portsdown Hill, UK

Portsea is an area of the city of Portsmouth, occupying much of the south-west area around the naval base. It was originally known as The Common, but had its name changed in 1792, taking its present name from Portsea Island on which it stands. In its past, Portsea was a separate settlement to the north of the town of Portsmouth (now Old Portsmouth) before being integrated into the Borough of Portsmouth in 1904, and City of Portsmouth in 1926.

Engineer Isambard Kingdom Brunel was born in Britain Street in 1806; and the professor William Garnett was born in Portsea on 30 December 1850.

The Portsea area was formerly an expanse of common land located between the original walled town of Portsmouth and the nearby dockyard. The Common, as it was named, began developing as a new settlement at the end of the 17th century as a response to overcrowding within the walls of the old town of Portsmouth. This development worried the governor of the dockyard, as he feared that the new buildings would provide cover for any forces attempting to attack. In 1703, he threatened to demolish any buildings within range of the cannons mounted on the dockyard walls. However, after a petition to Queen Anne, royal consent for the development was granted in 1704. Part of The Common's shoreline in Portsmouth Harbour became known as The Common Hard, so-named as its sloped hard clay shoreline was convenient for hauling boats into and from Portsmouth Harbour. In 1792 the name of the area was changed from The Common to Portsea (after Portsea Island), and by then it had a mixed dockside population.

William Tucker, baptised there in 1784, was convicted of shoplifting from a Portsea tailor, William Wilday, in 1798 and transported to New South Wales on the "death ship" Hillsborough which took convicts and typhus with it from Portsmouth to the colony. Tucker escaped and made it all the way back to Britain in 1803, only to be taken to Portsmouth for re-embarkation to Australia. He was later a sealer, established the retail trade in preserved Maori heads and settled in Otago, New Zealand, where he became that country's first art dealer before falling victim to his hosts in 1817 and being eaten. The novelist Sarah Doudney was born in Portsea on 15 January 1841.

Hertha Ayrton, British engineer, mathematician, physicist and inventor, was born there in 1854.

By the start of the 20th century, Portsmouth council had started to clear much of the slum housing in Portsea. The city's first council houses were built in the district in 1911. The 1920s and 1930s saw extensive redevelopment of the area, with many of the older slums being replaced by new council houses.

The area's proximity to the dockyard resulted in its taking massive bomb damage during World War II. After the war the area was redeveloped as all council housing, in a mixture of houses, maisonettes and tower blocks.

Portsea is also the name of a religious parish of Portsea Island and the city of Portsmouth,

Portsea's shoreline today still remains known as The Hard and is home to The Hard Interchange, a bus and coach terminus and Portsmouth Harbour railway station, which is built on a pier to the south of The Hard.

=== Rudmore ===
Rudmore is the name of a former residential district on the western side of Portsea Island near to the naval base and the present-day Portsmouth International Port. Rudmore was heavily bombed during World War II and was reduced to rubble. After the war, Rudmore was cleared to make way for the M275 motorway spur and the intersection junction now known as the "Rudmore Roundabout".

=== Somerstown ===
Somerstown is an inner city residential district of Portsmouth that was first founded in the early nineteenth century on land owned by a Mr. Somers, in whose name the district is now named. Somerstown is located to the south of Landport and to the north of Southsea.

=== Southsea ===
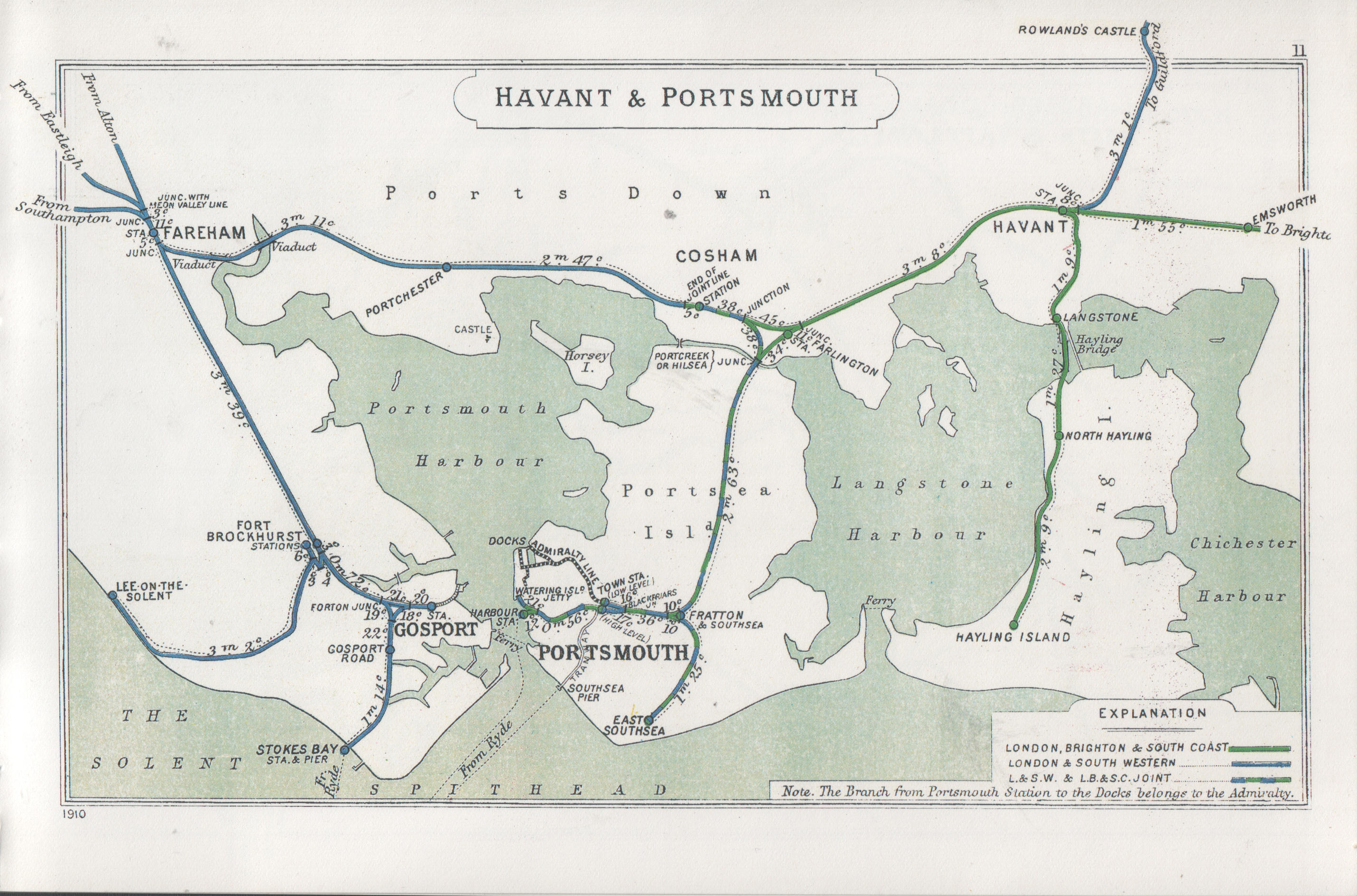
A 1910 Railway Clearing House map of lines around Portsmouth, showing the Southsea Railway

Southsea occupies the southern end of Portsea Island, within a mile (1.6 km) of Portsmouth's city centre and Portsmouth Harbour. Originally named Croxton Town after the land owner, a Mr. Croxton, Southsea grew into a popular Victorian seaside resort in the nineteenth century. Southsea has a thriving commercial area with well-known high street chains, and numerous independent traders which includes restaurants, bars, charity shops, food retailers and furniture/household goods shops. From 1999, Southsea had its own separate town council, but was reintegrated back into Portsmouth City Council in 2010.

From 1885, Southsea had its own railway branch line, named the Southsea Railway. The Southsea Railway incorporated three stations at Jessie Road Bridge Halt, Albert Road Bridge Halt and a terminus station called East Southsea at Granada Road. The railway line ran south off a branch line from Fratton Station. The Southsea Railway was closed in 1914 due to economic competition from trams. Railway track and stations were subsequently removed and replaced with roads and housing. On a modern map of Portsmouth, the route of the Southsea Railway can still clearly be seen from the arrangement of the newer housing and roads which replaced it.

=== Stamshaw ===
This residential area of terraced streets includes Alexandra Park, and the Mountbatten Sports Centre. To the north lie Tipner and Hilsea, and to the south are Kingston, Buckland and Commercial Road, the main retail area of the city. Stamshaw is bounded to its west by the M275 motorway and Whale Island, and to the east is North End. The main thoroughfares of Stamshaw, Twyford Avenue and Stamshaw Road, are two axes of a one-way traffic system.

An eponymous infant and junior school serve it. Its park adjoining the feeder road terminating at the city centre (with motorway status) has large fields and an adventure playground.

=== Tipner ===
This small north-west corner has the public parkland point, Tipner Point, and is a mixture of road use, retail/distribution and residential.

== Mainland suburbs of Portsmouth ==
Farlington, Drayton, Cosham, Wymering and Paulsgrove (including Port Solent) are suburbs of Portsmouth built on the mainland of Great Britain, not Portsea Island, all sharing the PO6 postcode area.
