= Drayton, Hampshire =

Suburb of Portsmouth, Hampshire, England

Coordinates: 50°50′41″N 1°02′39″W

Drayton
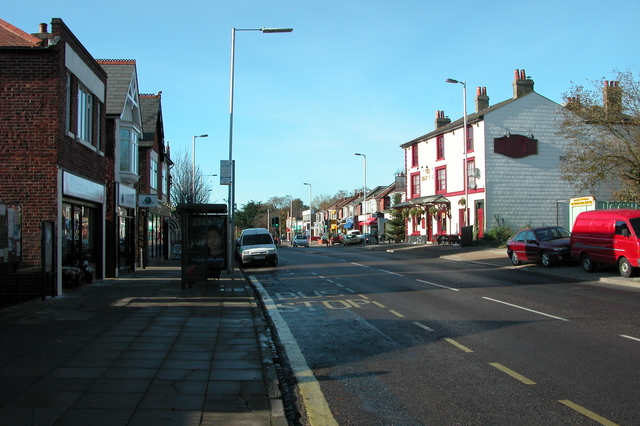
- Drayton is astride a part-commercial, part-residential street, Havant Road
- Population: 13,054 (2011 Census. Drayton and Farlington Ward)
- Unitary authority: Portsmouth
- Ceremonial county: Hampshire
- Region: South East
- Country: England
- Sovereign state: United Kingdom
- Post town: PORTSMOUTH
- Postcode district: PO6
- Dialling code: 023
- Police: Hampshire and Isle of Wight
- Fire: Hampshire and Isle of Wight
- Ambulance: South Central
- UK Parliament: Portsmouth North

Drayton is a residential area of the city of Portsmouth in the English county of Hampshire. Together with Farlington, its parent area, it makes up one of the electoral wards of the city. (Note: See in date order: ecclesiastical parish, select vestry and civil parish.)

== History ==
The earliest mention of Drayton was as a manor of Farlington parish. It appears in a document of the year 1250, when Henry III gave a moiety (legally fixed half share) of the land there to Roger de Merlay. Dreton appears as its form in the 14th century.

Unlike most of the city, Drayton lies on the mainland rather than Portsea Island. The manor may be included under the Domesday Book of 1086's entry of Cosham; both were within decades confirmed as in Farlington parish. The area including Drayton became incorporated into Portsmouth in 1920. This followed a fast rise throughout the south of the original 4-mile (6.4 km) by 1 1/4-mile (2.0 km) strip parish in suburban and urban house building, and strong economic ties with the city.

The hamlet of Drayton is now gradually developing into a residential locality. To the north of the road immediately past the New Inn is the Drayton building estate, on which new villas are rising steadily. South of the road is Drayton Manor, the residence of Lieut.-Col. Alfred Robert William Thistlethwayte, approached from the main road by Drayton Lane. — A History of the County of Hampshire: Volume 3, ed. William Page (London, 1908), pp. 148-151

The New Inn survives and is protected under law of England and Wales in the initial category (grade II listing). East of a mid-rise block of flats is a milestone, also listed.

== Amenities ==
Schools

- Solent Junior School.
- Springfield School

Anglican Community centre

In the Church of England the Church of the Resurrection and its hall is at the end of a short avenue north of Havant Road. The foundation stone was laid on 22 April 1930, by Lady Heath Harrison, the Bishop of Portsmouth attending. It includes a food bank and regular fairtrade goods market.

United Reformed and Methodist centre

Drayton United Church is a joint Methodist and United Reformed Church on Havant Road; its building has all of its windows and their casements in the medieval style and it was built in the early 20th century.

Nearest other places of worship and religious community

In the Roman Catholic Church St Colman's Church and its Hall are in Cosham, in green landscaped grounds, 600 metres west from the above church, equally on Havant Road.

== Former station ==
Station Road, Drayton once served the now-demolished Farlington Racecourse station which closed in 1938. Likewise, the station intended for Station Road, Copnor was never built, so Portsmouth now has two Station Roads without railway stations.

Drayton also lends its name to the Drayton Railway Triangle, in which the expansive Railway Triangle Industrial Estate resides, and is accessible from Walton Road, Drayton, Portsmouth.
