= M275 motorway =

Motorway in Hampshire, southern England

M275
- M275 highlighted in blue

Route information
- Maintained by Portsmouth City Council
- Length: 2.0 mi (3.2 km)
- Existed: 1976–present

Major junctions
- North end: Wymering
- M27 motorway
- South end: Portsmouth

Location
- Country: United Kingdom

Road network
- Roads in the United Kingdom; Motorways; A and B road zones
← M271	→ M602

The M275 is a 2-mile-long (3 km), dual three-lane motorway in Hampshire, southern England. It is the principal road route for entering and leaving Portsmouth. It continues as the A3 into Portsmouth, and meets the M27 at its northern terminus. From the motorway, there are scenic views over Portsmouth harbour, and the Sails of the South between the two carriageways.

The M275 is not the responsibility of National Highways. It is managed by Portsmouth City Council from the point where the slip roads to the M27 end. The M275 was not built with a full hard shoulder. For its entire length, a narrow verge is maintained, although there is space available for a full-width shoulder. Instead, drivers are warned on entry from the A3 and M27 of the lack of hard shoulder, with signs saying "no hard shoulder for 2 miles".

== History ==
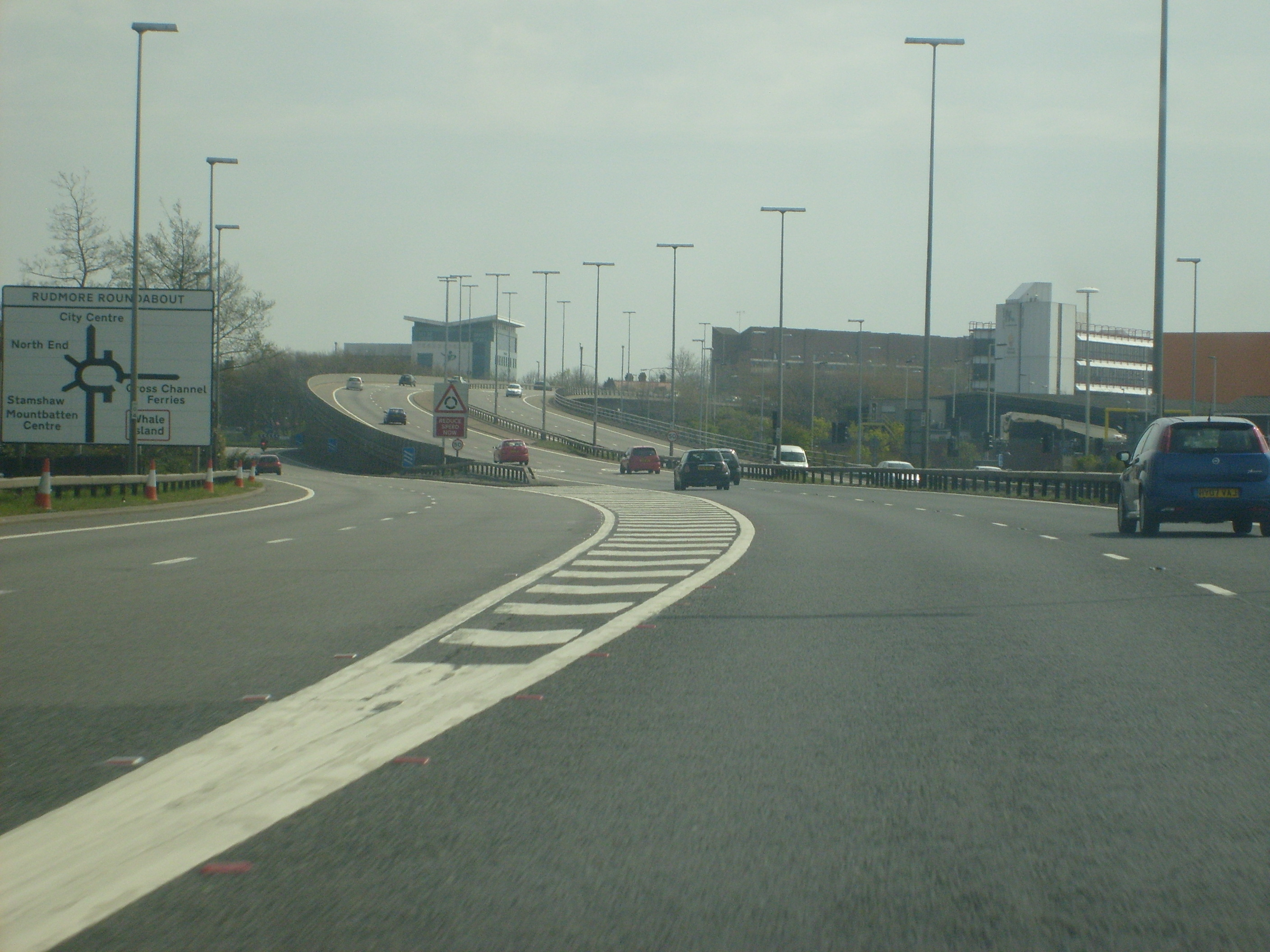
The M275 nearing Portsmouth

The motorway was opened throughout its entire length in 1976. A junction was originally planned for a new development in the Tipner area of Portsmouth, known as the Gateway Project, which was shelved at the time. The junction's construction was abandoned primarily because planners realised that it would breach regulations that there must be a minimum of 1.25 miles (2.01 km) between motorway junctions. Before construction was halted, significant work had been carried out, including four incomplete slip roads with no road surfacing, two bridges above the site for the main roundabout, and realignment of Tipner Lane so that it served the roundabout. In 2001, the Sails of the South was unveiled close to the site of the missing junction. In 2005, Portsmouth City Council carried out refurbishments to gantry mounted signs on approach to the M27 junction. New signage was stuck over old signage, and was significantly smaller and disproportionate to the previous layout. Incorrect lane illustrations, lack of adequate route information, and increased difficulty to read at a long distance lead to driver frustration and confusion.

In 2005, the Tipner Gateway Project was resurrected along with plans for a junction. As previously, preparatory works have been carried out for the junction. Due to the regulations regarding junction spacing, the speed limit on the main carriageway of the M275 has been reduced to 60 mph (97 km/h), and 50 mph (80 km/h) on the slip roads and from the southern end of Mile End Road to the Kingston Crescent Junction. The latter junction was to be renamed junction 2, with the new Tipner Junction becoming junction 1. Most of the road signs have been replaced and the M27/M275 interchange has been remodelled to make it easier for drivers, including splitting one lane into two, although this has meant that some of the overhead gantry signs are now redundant. Completion of the junction was achieved April 2014. The junction now leads to Tipner West. There is a large park and ride site for over 600 cars alongside the junction.

== Junctions ==
County	Location	mi	km	Junction	Destinations	Notes
Hampshire	Portsmouth	0	0	— (Note: 50.845°N 1.088°W)	A27 - Brighton, Southampton	
Hampshire	Portsmouth	0.7	1.2	— (Note: 50.839°N 1.088°W)	M27 - Brighton, Southampton	No northbound entrance from East and no eastbound exit from North
Hampshire	Portsmouth	1.9	3.1	1 (Note: 50.824°N 1.092°W)	Tipner	
Hampshire	Portsmouth	2.7	4.4	2 (Note: 50.813°N 1.086°W)	A3 - Portsmouth, Buckland A2047 - Fratton	
1.000 mi = 1.609 km; 1.000 km = 0.621 mi: Incomplete access

*Ceremonial Counties

Coordinate list

== See also ==
- List of motorways in the United Kingdom
