= Cosham =

Suburb of Portsmouth, Hampshire, England

Coordinates: 50.8424°N 1.0660°W

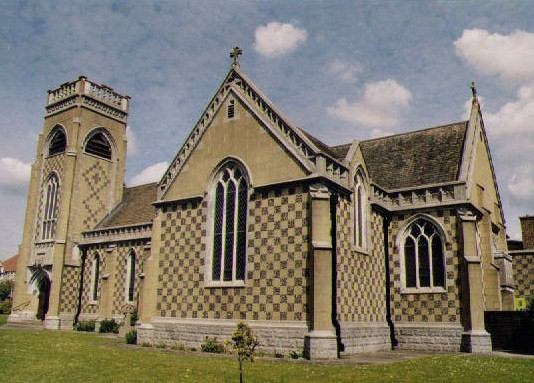
- St. Colman Catholic Church

- Location within Hampshire
- Population: 13,830 (2011.Ward)
- OS grid reference: SU657052
- Unitary authority: Portsmouth
- Ceremonial county: Hampshire
- Region: South East
- Country: England
- Sovereign state: United Kingdom
- Post town: PORTSMOUTH
- Postcode district: PO6
- Dialling code: 023
- Police: Hampshire and Isle of Wight
- Fire: Hampshire and Isle of Wight
- Ambulance: South Central
- UK Parliament: Portsmouth North

Cosham (/ˈkɒʃəm/ or /ˈkɒsəm/) is a northern suburb of Portsmouth lying within the city boundary but off Portsea Island, in the ceremonial county of Hampshire, England. It is mentioned in the Domesday Book of 1086 along with Drayton and Wymering (mainland) and Bocheland (Buckland), Frodington (Fratton) and Copenore (Copnor) on the island.

== Toponymy ==
The name is of Saxon origin (shown by the -ham suffix) and means "Cossa's homestead". Originally pronounced /ˈkɒsəm/, since the latter half of the 20th century /ˈkɒʃəm/ has become more widely used. Until the 1920s it was a separate small village surrounded by fields (including on the north end of Portsea Island).

== History ==
King Æthelred the Unready lay terminally ill in Cosham when King Cnut of Denmark began his invasion of the south coast of England in 1015.

In later centuries, extensive suburban growth expanded around the village and both east and west along the slopes of Portsdown Hill. It has been for many years a local route centre as a pinch point for buses travelling in and out of Portsmouth and offers three railway routes to London. Cosham railway station was until 1935 the terminus for City trams and trolleybuses from the south and Portsdown and Horndean Light Railway trams to the north. The High Street is a significant local shopping centre. Few traces of the original village now remain; the oldest houses (Chalk Cottage of 1777 and Mile Stone Cottages of 1793) were demolished in the 1960s and replaced by a car park, but the old milepost showing mileage to London, Petersfield and Portsmouth remains. The interior of St Philip's Church (1938) in Highbury is cited as a fine example of Ninian Comper's work. Indeed, England's 1000 Best Parish Churches (by Simon Jenkins) regards St Philip's as the only parish church within Portsmouth worth visiting on architectural merit.

== Economy ==
Cosham was once home to the UK headquarters of IBM UK Ltd. The site formerly known as 'North Harbour' was built in the 1970s. It is now known as Lakeside Business Park.

== Local amenities ==
The Queen Alexandra Hospital is situated in the north of the area at the bottom of Portsdown Hill. Locally referred to as simply QA, it is the major hospital for the south-east Hampshire and south-west West Sussex area.

Cosham railway station provides frequent services by 3 train companies to destinations including Brighton, London Waterloo, Bristol, Cardiff, and Southampton.

== Education ==
The main campus of Highbury College is situated in the south east of Cosham on the Highbury estate.
