= East Southsea railway station =

Disused railway station in England

Coordinates: 50.781075°N 1.077263°W

East Southsea
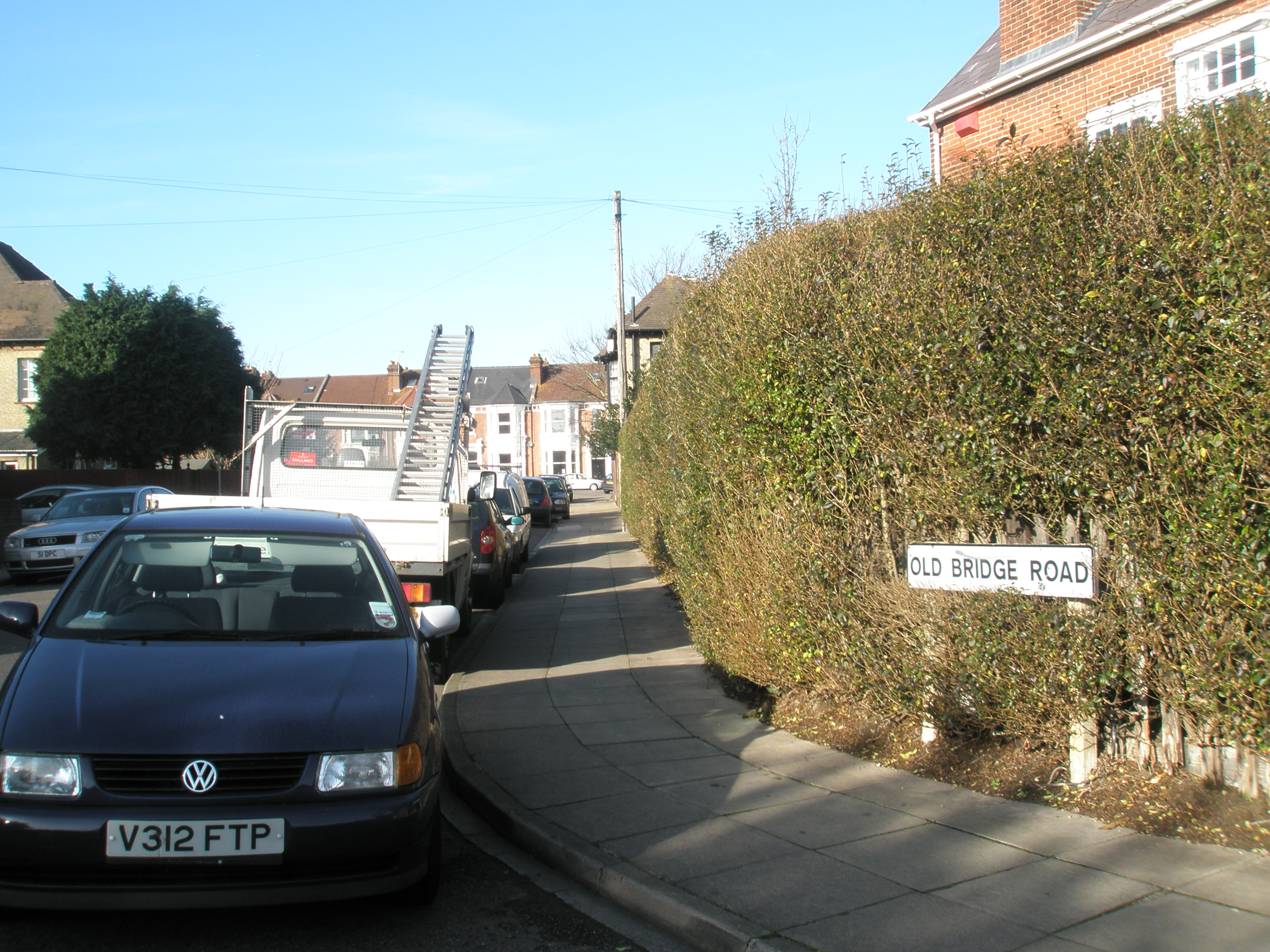
- The line crossed a bridge here at Old Bridge Road and terminated shortly afterwards

General information
- Location: Southsea, City of Portsmouth; England
- Grid reference: SZ651983
- Platforms: 3 (1885-1904), 1 (1904-1914)

Other information
- Status: Disused

History
- Opened: 1 July 1885; 140 years ago
- Closed: 6 August 1914; 111 years ago
- Original company: Southsea Railway
Location

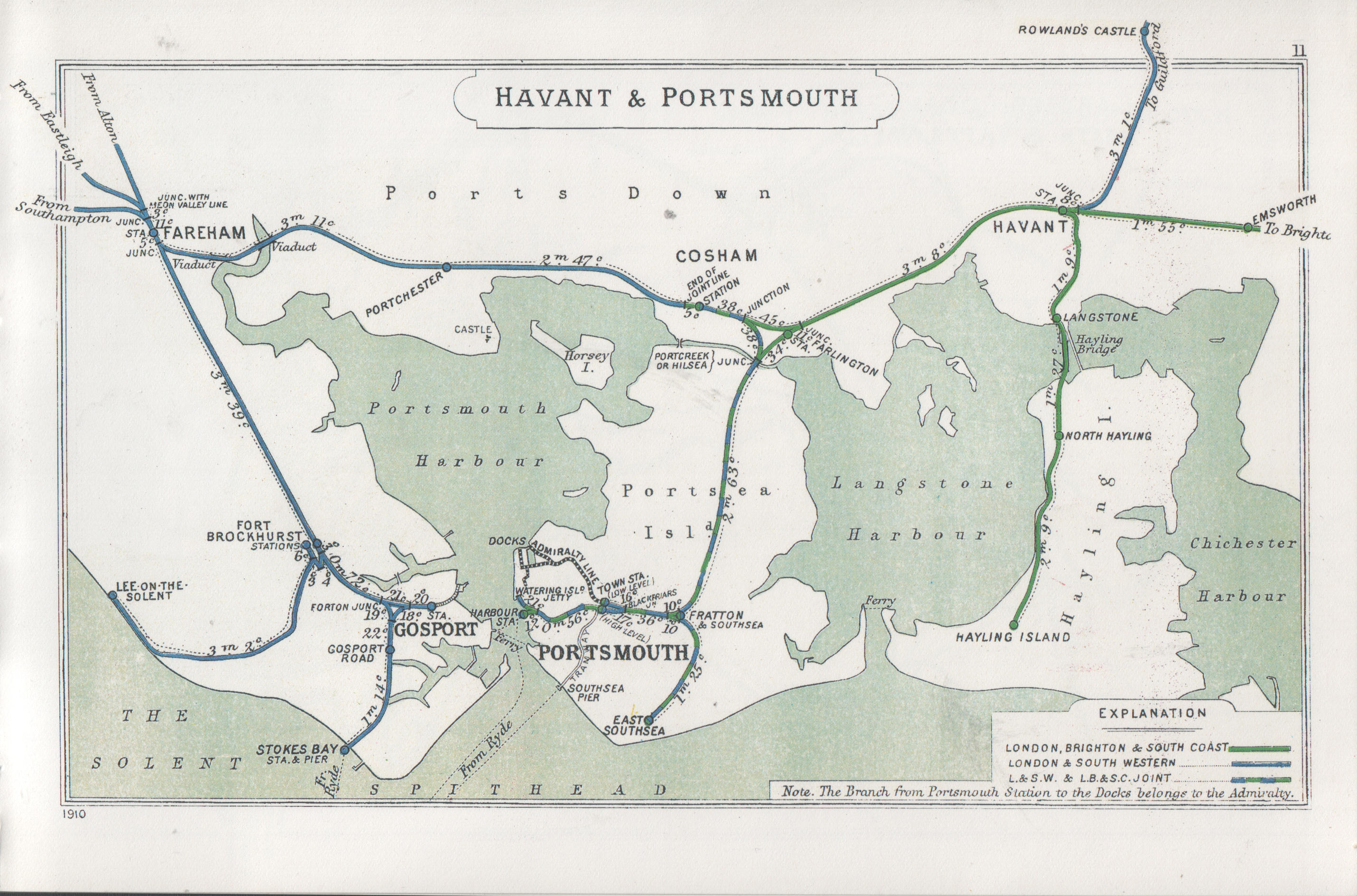
A 1910 Railway Clearing House map of lines around Portsmouth, showing the Southsea Railway

East Southsea was the name of two terminus railway stations of the 1.25 mile Southsea Railway, which linked the Southsea seaside resort with the Portsmouth Direct Line at Fratton railway station. The later 1904 station replaced an earlier, larger, grander station building, which opened as Southsea in 1885 and was renamed East Southsea in 1896.

== History ==
=== First East Southsea railway station (1885-1904) ===
The first terminus station of the Southsea Railway was named Southsea and was built in a grand Queen Anne style. The station was located 50 yards (46 m) to the north of Granada Road, Southsea, and south of the southern side of St. Simon's Church, in St. Ronan's Road, Southsea. The station and its tracks were orientated diagonally north-east in parallel with the southern side of St. Ronan's Road, and had three 360 feet (110 m) long platforms under a glass paned roof.

Southsea station, along with the Southsea Railway and Fratton railway station were jointly opened on 1 July 1885 by Lady Ada Mary Willis (née Neeld), wife of General Sir George Willis, the Lieutenant Governor of Portsmouth. The Southsea Railway was built to serve the fashionable Victorian seaside resort of Southsea, and at its northern end, the Southsea Railway connected to the Portsmouth Direct Line at Fratton railway station.

The station was renamed East Southsea in May 1896.

=== Second East Southsea railway station (1904-1914) ===
By the twentieth century, the Southsea Railway was experiencing competition with Portsmouth Corporation Transport trams and trolleybuses. Conventional steam trains on the line were replaced in 1903 with 56 feet (17 m) long steam railcars. The steam-powered railcars had small wheels and allegedly gave passengers a bumpy ride. As a cost-cutting measure, the Southsea Railway leased out the original 1885 East Southsea station building in 1904, which become a motor engineers garage. The terminus was then moved 50 yards (46 m) south down the station driveway to a small wooden single platform with a waiting room, built directly on Granada Road also named East Southsea station.

In 1904, the newer, smaller East Southsea station was joined by two unstaffed halt stations at Albert Road and Jessie Road, added to the Southsea Railway line. These additions were initially a success, but were unable to compete with Portsmouth's burgeoning tramway network and passenger numbers began to decline.

== Closure, First World War and fate ==
By 1914, the threat of the First World War loomed. The final nail in the Southsea Railway's coffin was a government directive issued shortly after the declaration of war to the effect that railways unable to support themselves would cease operations at the earliest opportunity; and, as the line clearly fell into this category, the last train ran on 6 August 1914. The original 1885 East Southsea station at Granada Road was used as a munitions store during the war., while the rail line itself served as an additional overflow siding from Fratton railway station's goods yard.

After the war, the Southsea Railway and its stations lay abandoned. Partial removal of the line was sanctioned by Section 55 of the Southern Railway Act 1923. The original 1885 East Southsea station at Granada Road was converted into a road vehicle garage business, until it was fully demolished and cleared in the 1970s.

== Legacy ==
On 4 July 1905, Fratton railway station's name was changed to Fratton & Southsea to promote its Southsea Railway branchline link to the seaside resort of Southsea.

After the demise of the Southsea Railway, Fratton & Southsea station reverted to its original Fratton name on 1 December 1921.

The Southsea name was later transferred to Portsmouth's main Portsmouth Town railway station in 1925 creating the present-day Portsmouth & Southsea railway station name.

The site of East Southsea's original terminus station is now occupied by a late twentieth century residential cul-de-sac named Chewter Close, just to the north of Granada Road in Southsea. The original 1885 terminus station building was located at the northern end of today's Chewter Close until its demolition in the 1970s. A mural commemorating the station was unveiled on the northernmost wall in Chewter Close on 26 August 2011. This wall was not part of the original East Southsea station building, as the wall was built after the railway line closed and was built as a boundary wall between the rear gardens of newer inter-war period houses that became Parkstone Avenue and the garage business that occupied the original station building. The smaller, later 1904 East Southsea station site is now occupied by modern houses close to the junction of Chewter Close and Granada Road.

Preceding station	Disused railways	Following station
Albert Road; Bridge Halt	Southsea Railway	Terminus

== See also ==
- List of closed railway stations in Britain
