= Albert Road Bridge Halt railway station =

Disused railway station in England

Coordinates: 50.787313°N 1.070047°W

Albert Road Bridge Halt

General information
- Location: Southsea, City of Portsmouth; England
- Grid reference: SZ656990
- Platforms: 1

Other information
- Status: Disused

History
- Opened: 1 July 1904; 122 years ago
- Closed: 8 August 1914; 111 years ago
- Original company: Southsea Railway
Location

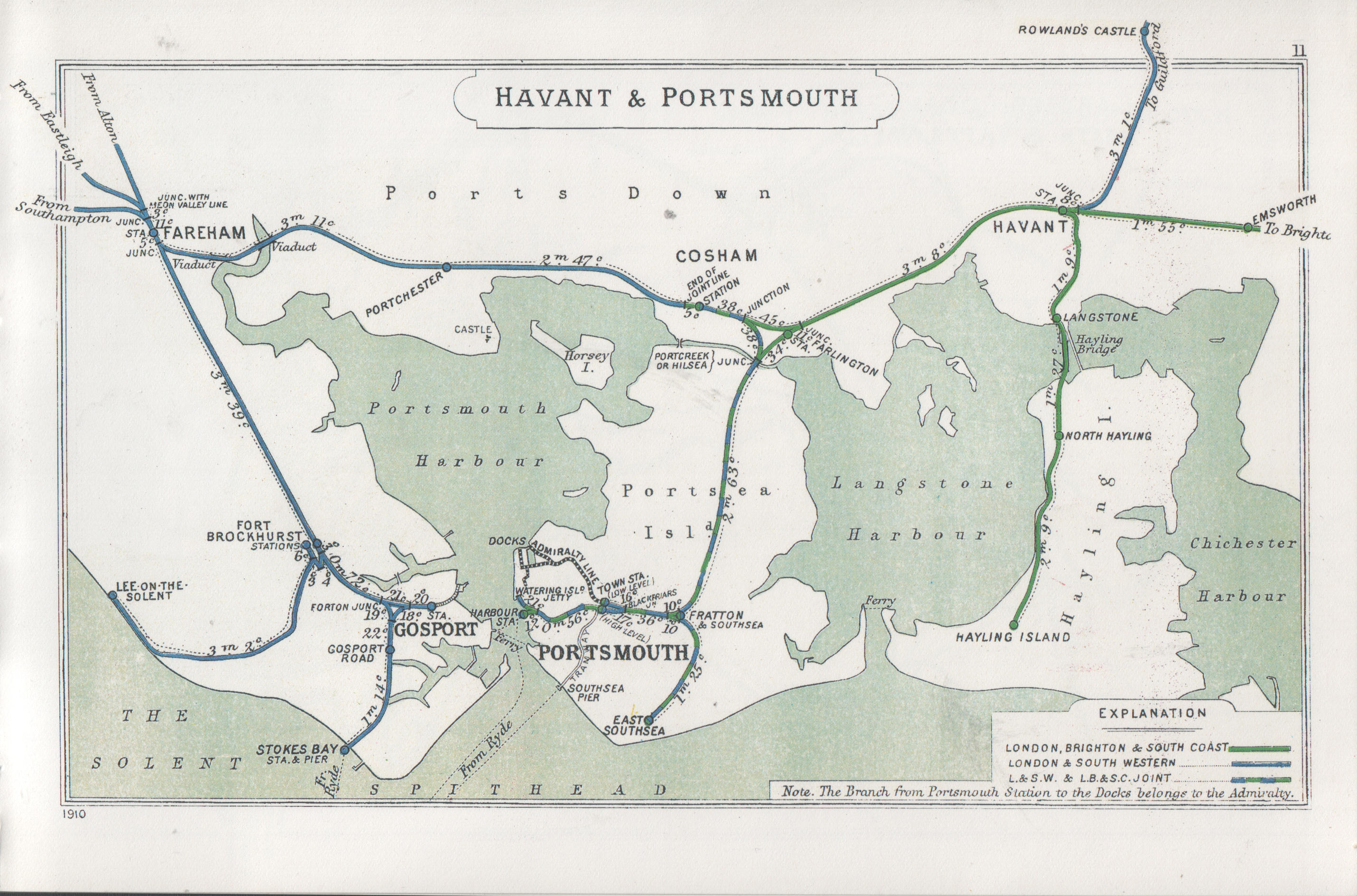
A 1910 Railway Clearing House map of lines around Portsmouth, showing the Southsea Railway

Albert Road Bridge Halt (sometimes called Highland Road) was an intermediate station situated on the Southsea Railway, between Jessie Road Bridge Halt and East Southsea.

The Southsea Railway opened on 1 July 1885, and on that line, Albert Road Bridge Halt was opened on 1 July 1904 and closed a decade later on 6 August 1914, it was part of a concerted effort to boost revenue and thus see off competition from the burgeoning tramway network. The Southsea Railway was jointly owned by the London and South Western Railway and the London, Brighton and South Coast Railway, and very unusually, the two companies ran the line in alternate years. The final nail in the line's coffin was a government directive issued shortly after the declaration of war that railways unable to support themselves would cease operations at the earliest opportunity; and, as the line clearly fell into this category, the last train ran early in August 1914.

Preceding station	Disused railways	Following station
Jessie Road; Bridge Halt	Southsea Railway	East Southsea

== See also ==
- List of closed railway stations in Britain
