= Fratton railway station =

Railway station in England

Fratton
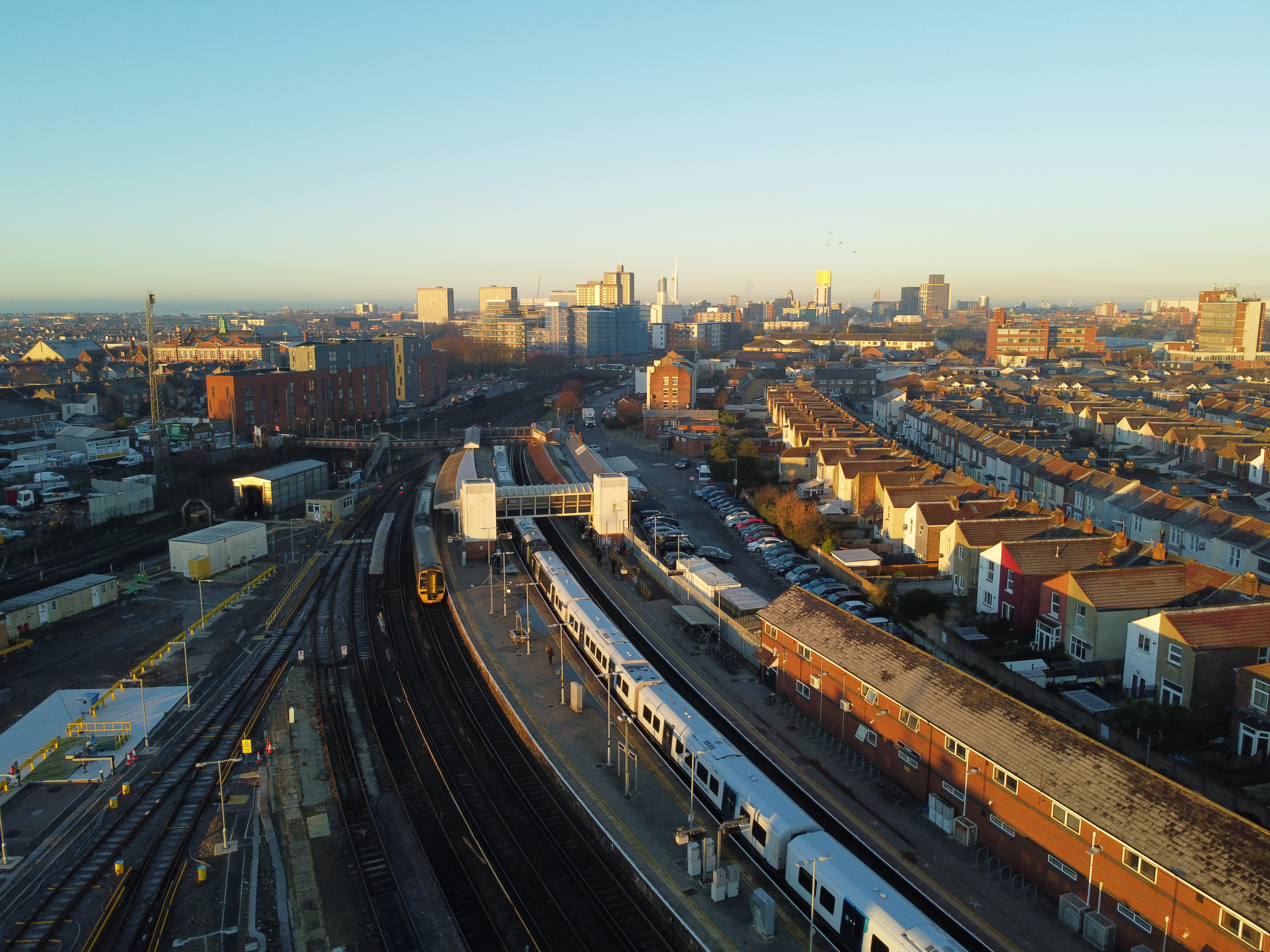
- Fratton, 2022. Two trains for Portsmouth can be seen calling.

General information
- Location: Fratton, Portsmouth; England
- Coordinates: 50.7964°N 1.0740°W
- Grid reference: SU653000
- Manager: South Western Railway
- Platforms: 3

Other information
- Station code: FTN
- Classification: DfT category C2

History
- Opened: 1 July 1885; 141 years ago
- Original company: Portsmouth and Ryde Joint Railway
- Pre-grouping: Portsmouth and Ryde Joint Railway
- Post-grouping: Southern Railway

Key dates
- 1 July 1885: Opened (Fratton)
- 4 July 1905: Renamed (Fratton and Southsea)
- 1 December 1921: Renamed (Fratton)

Passengers
- 2020/21: ▼0.631 million
- Interchange: ▼24,815
- 2021/22: ▲1.519 million
- Interchange: ▲72,962
- 2022/23: ▲1.776 million
- Interchange: ▲0.154 million
- 2023/24: ▲1.955 million
- Interchange: ▼0.149 million
- 2024/25: ▲2.080 million
- Interchange: ▼80,911
Location
Notes
- Passenger statistics from the Office of Rail and Road

Fratton railway station is a railway station in the city of Portsmouth, on Portsea Island in England. It was opened in the Fratton area of Portsmouth on 1 July 1885 as an interchange station between the London, Brighton and South Coast Railway and the short-lived Southsea Railway branchline.

Fratton railway station and the Southsea Railway were jointly opened on 1 July 1885 by Lady Ada Mary Willis, wife of General Sir George Willis, the Lieutenant Governor of Portsmouth.

On 4 July 1905, Fratton railway station's name was changed to Fratton & Southsea to promote its Southsea Railway branchline link to the seaside resort of Southsea. After the Southsea Railway branchline was closed on 6 August 1914, the name of the station was eventually changed back to Fratton on 1 December 1921. The Southsea name was later reused in 1925 to rename Portsmouth's main Portsmouth Town station to Portsmouth & Southsea, as Portsmouth would be elevated from a town to city status in 1926.

500 metres (1/3 mile) to the east of Fratton railway station is Fratton Park, built in 1899 as the home football ground of Portsmouth F.C. Fratton Park's naming was purposely influenced by its proximity to the convenient Fratton railway station, although the stadium is actually located in the Milton district of Portsmouth.

Today, Fratton station is located on the Portsmouth Direct Line which runs between London Waterloo and Portsmouth Harbour.

Fratton is one of the four railway stations on Portsea Island. Due to its location as the last south-bound stop before the main Portsmouth & Southsea railway station, Fratton has been adopted in naval slang as a euphemism for the withdrawal method of contraception, "to get off at Fratton". However, despite Portsmouth & Southsea often being considered the principal station, Fratton is, as of the 2023-24 data collection period, the busiest station in Portsmouth, with Portsmouth & Southsea placing at third place in usage within Portsmouth.

== Platforms ==
Normally, platforms 2 and 3 serve Portsmouth & Southsea and Portsmouth Harbour, with platform 1 serving all other destinations. Platforms 2 and 3 are also signalled to allow northbound passenger departures.

Between 1885 and 1914, a separate island platform at Fratton station served as the interchange platform to the short-lived Southsea Railway branchline. The island was accessed from a staircase built on the south-east side of the main footbridge. This island was demolished after the Southsea Railway was closed. A modern train washing machine structure is now located on the site.

== History ==
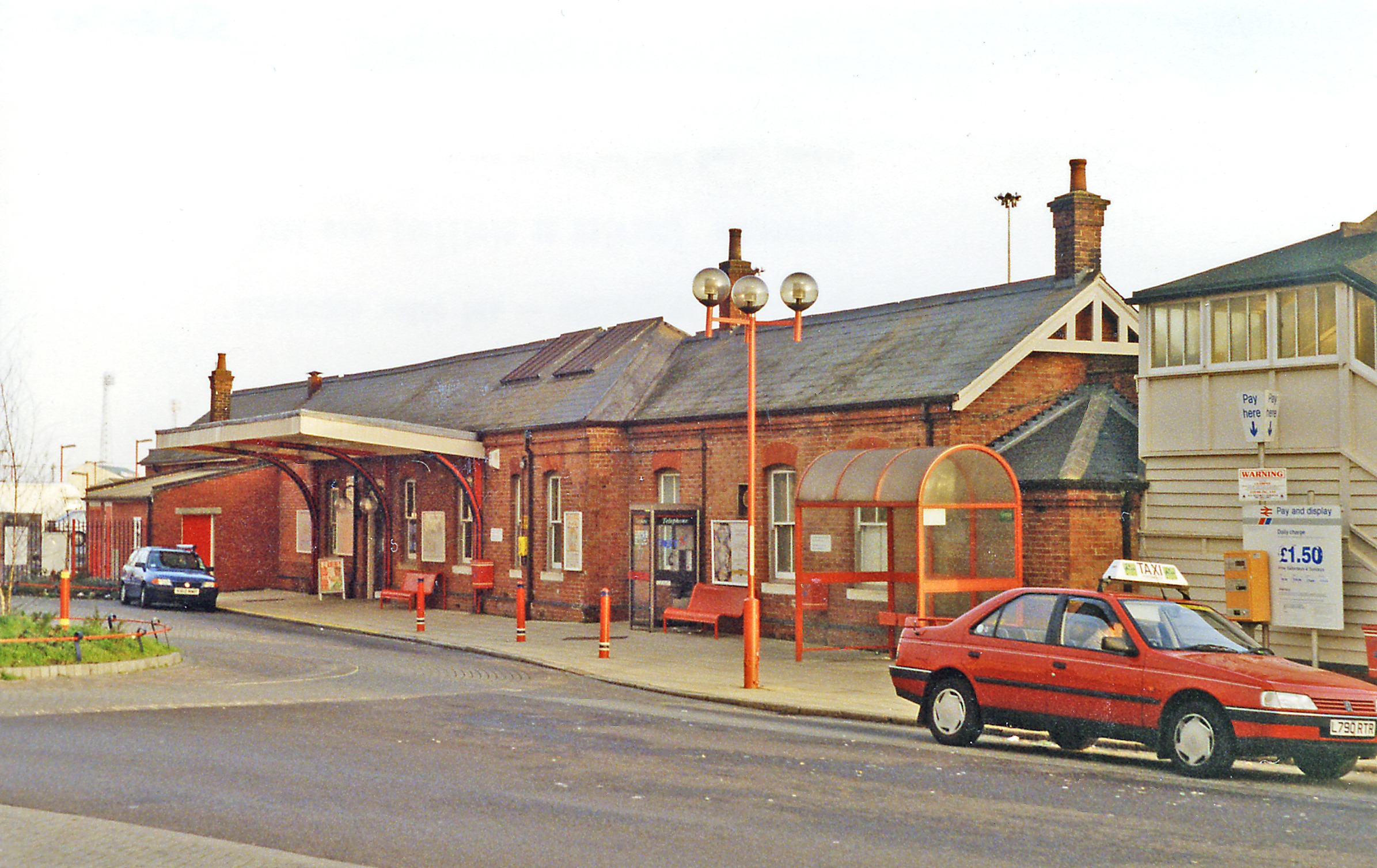
The main station buildings in Selbourne Terrace, Fratton.

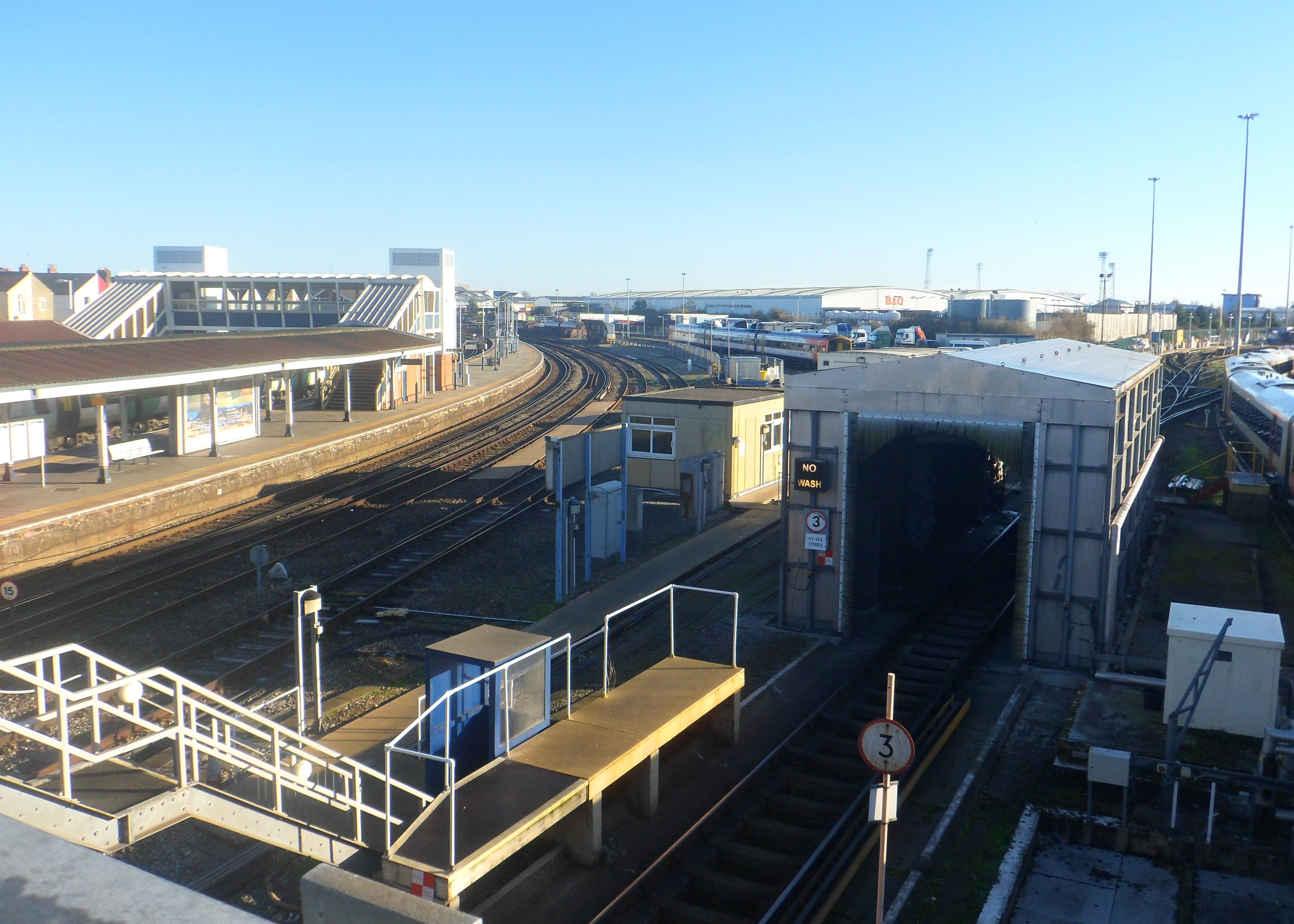
Fratton train wash, the former site of the Southsea Railway island platform

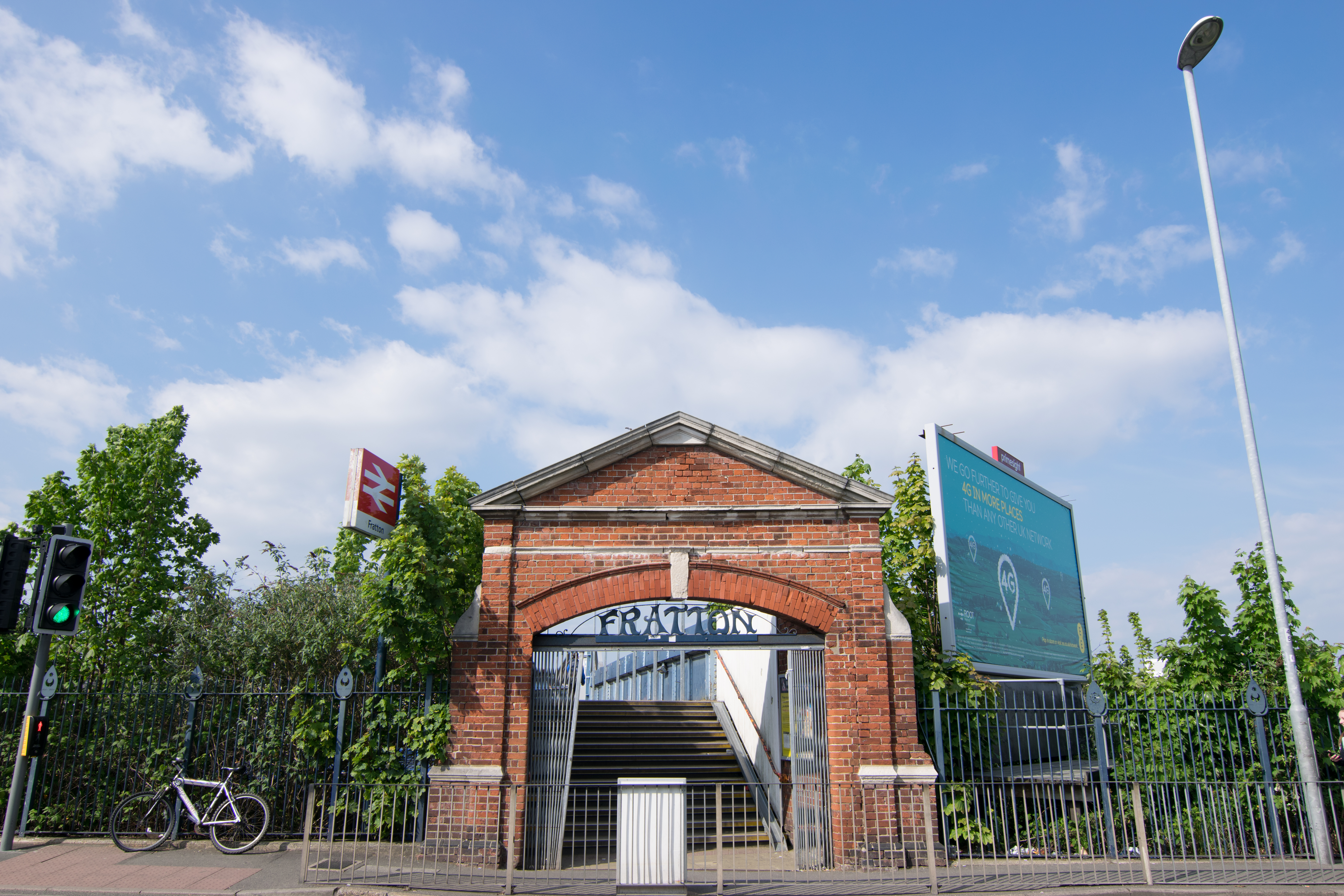
Fratton station pedestrian footbridge in Goldsmith Avenue.

The line through Fratton and into central Portsmouth was laid on the abandoned dry canal bed of the unsuccessful Portsmouth and Arundel Canal, which was opened in 1823 and closed in 1827, after seawater from the canal contaminated some of Portsmouth's fresh water wells. In 1845 parts of this section were sold to the Chichester to Portsmouth Branch Railway company with another section being sold to the company in 1851. The former canal walls are still clearly visible between Fratton and Portsmouth city centre today. Canal barges also had an alternative route to and from Portsmouth via Portsbridge Creek, avoiding the need to move through Portsea Island.

The railway line through Fratton was planned by the Brighton and Chichester Railway as part of the Chichester to Portsmouth Branch Railway, approved in 1845. The line was completed in 1847, the Brighton and Chichester railway merging with several other companies to form the London, Brighton and South Coast Railway in 1846, who went on to operate the line.

Fratton railway station was planned and built to serve as an interchange station between Portsmouth and the new one-and-a-quarter mile (2 km) long Southsea Railway branch line, built to serve the fashionable Victorian seaside resort of Southsea. It was built with an additional island platform to the south of the station's three main platforms, which specifically served the Southsea Railway and was reached by a staircase leading from the main overhead footbridge. This island platform and staircase was removed after the Southsea Railway was closed, its former location now has a modern train washing facility built over it.

Originally, an alternative interchange station for the Southsea Railway was to be built at Copnor, Portsmouth – at the purposely built Station Road – but it never was, with Fratton being the later preferred location. Ironically, Station Road still survives in Copnor today. The unbuilt station site, near today's Copnor Bridge, has since been developed with a short row of terraced houses, a bus stop and a public lavatory block.

Fratton railway station and the Southsea Railway were jointly opened on 1 July 1885 by Lady Ada Mary Willis (née Neeld), wife of General Sir George Willis, the Lieutenant Governor of Portsmouth. Fratton railway station was used as the interchange station to the Southsea Railway branch line, whose original 1885 terminus at Southsea station was built on Granada Road, Southsea, replaced by East Southsea in 1904. On 4 July 1905, Fratton railway station's name was changed to Fratton & Southsea.

In 1891, the main Portsmouth Town engine sheds were moved to the railway sidings at Fratton. By 1914, with the threat of the First World War and an urgent need to expand railway freight sidings in Fratton, the loss-making Southsea Railway branch line was closed to passengers on 6 August 1914 and became an overflow freight siding, and never reopened. After the war, Fratton & Southsea reverted to its original name of Fratton on 1 December 1921. The Southsea name was later reused to rename the main Portsmouth Town station in 1925, to Portsmouth & Southsea.

After the Motive power depot closed in the late 1950s, some former sidings were used during the withdrawal of the South West Trains greyhound fleet around 2003. The same sidings were then used in 2007 and in 2009 for freight trials, this involved DB Schenker Rail (UK) hauling small container trains to and from Eastleigh. The Idea was abandoned in 2010 due to running costs.

=== Portsmouth Area Resignalling (PARS) ===
The Portsmouth Area Resignalling project was instigated in late 2006, aiming to improve the flexibility of the track layout in the Fratton area. Platform 1 became the Up Main, Platform 3 became the Down Main with Platform 2 as a bidirectional through platform (although the main function of platform 2 is down line trains). Prior to the project, trains could not reverse south to north at Fratton in service.

The work, scheduled by Network Rail to take place between 23 December 2006 and 4 February 2007, was subject to a massive overrun. The works were first extended six weeks into mid-March 2007 but in late February it became obvious that there were major problems with the new equipment being installed by the contractor Siemens.

Until 1 April 2007 there were only three trains per hour between Fratton and Portsmouth Harbour with the remaining services terminating at Fratton and passengers using a replacement bus service. After 2 April 2007 there were five trains per hour running between Fratton and Portsmouth – three South West Trains services, one Southern service and one Great Western Railway service with some services still terminating at Fratton with passengers forced to change to continue their journey. The 'six-week project' was eventually completed in October 2007 – some ten months after it started.

=== New footbridge ===
A new footbridge is now operational, linking the island platform (platforms 2 and 3) with the Up Main platform (1). This has stairs and lifts to allow disabled users full access to all trains, with lifts designed for easy wheelchair use.

== Motive power depots ==
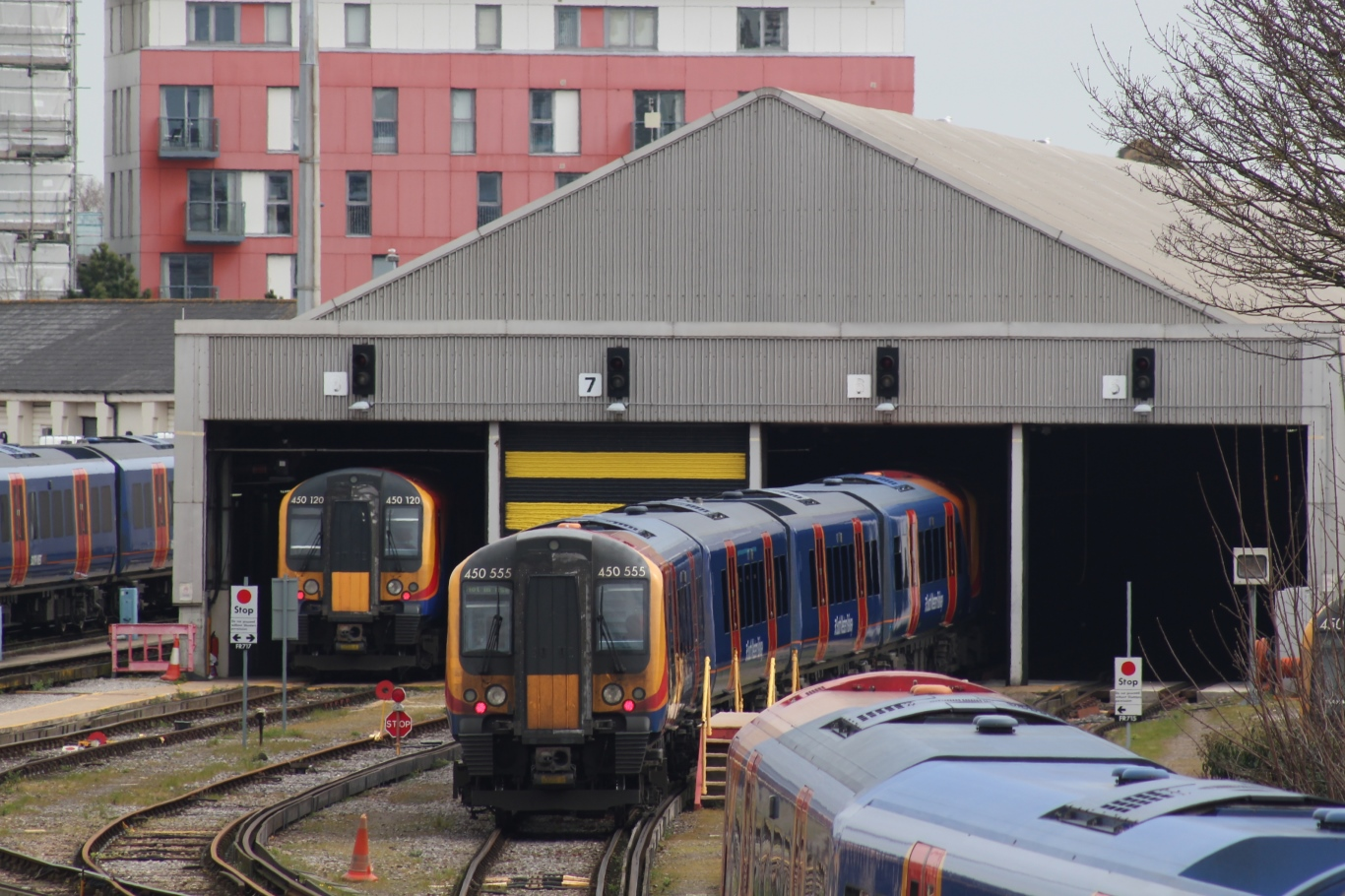
Fratton Traincare Depot

The London Brighton and South Coast Railway and the London and South Western Railway jointly built a motive power depot at Fratton in 1891, replacing an earlier one at Portsmouth Town station. It was of the double roundhouse type. It came under the ownership of Southern Railway (Great Britain) in 1923 and British Railways in 1948. This building was badly damaged by bombs during the Second World War but repaired in 1948. It closed 2 November 1959, but the building continued to be used for stabling locomotives for several years. They were demolished in 1969. Fratton Traction Maintenance Depot, operated by South Western Railway now occupies part of the site.

== Services ==
Services at Fratton are operated by South Western Railway, Southern and Great Western Railway.

Typical off-peak services are as follows:

=== South Western Railway ===
The typical off-peak service in trains per hour is:

- 2 tph to London Waterloo via Guildford (1 semi-fast, 1 stopping)
- 1 tph to London Waterloo via Basingstoke
- 1 tph to Southampton Central
- 4 tph to Portsmouth & Southsea of which 3 continue to Portsmouth Harbour

South Western Railway services at Fratton are operated using Class 444 and 450 EMUs.

=== Southern ===
The typical off-peak service in trains per hour is:

- 2 tph to London Victoria via Horsham
- 1 tph to Brighton via Worthing
- 3 tph to Portsmouth & Southsea of which 2 continue to Portsmouth Harbour

Southern services at Fratton are operated Class 377 EMUs.

=== Great Western Railway ===
The typical off-peak service in trains per hour is:

- 1 tph to Cardiff Central via Bristol Temple Meads
- 1 tph to Portsmouth Harbour

Great Western Railway services at Fratton are operated using Class 158, Class 165 and 166 DMUs.

Preceding station	National Rail	Following station
Hilsea or Havant	Southern West Coastway Line	Portsmouth & Southsea
Hilsea or Havant	South Western Railway Portsmouth Direct Line	Portsmouth & Southsea
Hilsea	South Western Railway West Coastway Line	Portsmouth & Southsea
Cosham	Great Western Railway West Coastway Line	Portsmouth & Southsea
	Disused railways	
Terminus	Southsea Railway	Jessie Road; Bridge Halt
