= Southsea =

Seaside resort in Portsmouth, Hampshire, England

Coordinates: 50.785°N 1.07°W

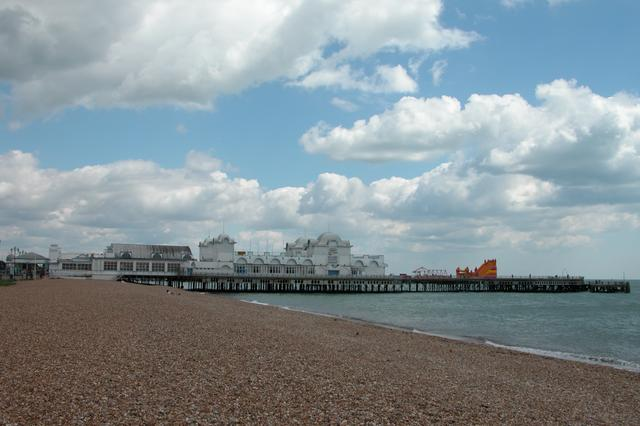
- South Parade Pier

- Location within Hampshire
- Population: 18,514 (2001); 16,660 (2011 Census. Central Southsea Ward)
- OS grid reference: SZ6499
- Unitary authority: Portsmouth
- Ceremonial county: Hampshire
- Region: South East
- Country: England
- Sovereign state: United Kingdom
- Post town: SOUTHSEA
- Postcode district: PO4, PO5
- Dialling code: 023
- Police: Hampshire and Isle of Wight
- Fire: Hampshire and Isle of Wight
- Ambulance: South Central
- UK Parliament: Portsmouth South

Southsea is a seaside resort and a geographic area of Portsmouth, Portsea Island in the ceremonial county of Hampshire, England. Southsea is located 1.8 miles (2.8 km) to the south of Portsmouth's inner city-centre.

Southsea began as a fashionable 19th-century Victorian seaside resort named Croxton Town, after a Mr Croxton who owned the land. As the resort grew, it adopted the name of nearby Southsea Castle, a seafront fort constructed in 1544 to help defend the Solent and approaches to Portsmouth Harbour.

In 1879, South Parade Pier was opened by Princess Edward of Saxe-Weimar in Southsea. The pier began operating a passenger steamer service across the Solent to the Isle of Wight. This service gave rise to the idea of linking Southsea and its pier to Portsmouth's railway line, and for tourists to bypass the busy town of Portsmouth and its crowded harbour. East Southsea railway station, along with the Southsea Railway and Fratton railway station were jointly opened on 1 July 1885 by Lady Ada Mary Willis (née Neeld), wife of General Sir George Willis, the Lieutenant Governor of Portsmouth.

Southsea subsequently grew into a dense residential suburb and large, distinct commercial and entertainment area, separate from the town of Portsmouth up until Southsea and the whole of Portsea Island were incorporated into the town borough of Portsmouth in 1904.

Due to declining use and World War I, the Southsea Railway line and its East Southsea station were closed on 6 August 1914. To maintain Southsea's tourism, the Southsea station name was moved and merged with Portsmouth's main town centre railway station in 1925, officially becoming known as Portsmouth & Southsea railway station. A year later in 1926, Portsmouth was granted official city status, while its main railway station retained its "Portsmouth & Southsea" name, which has led many non-locals and visitors to wrongly assume that Southsea is still a separate town near to Portsmouth.

The areas of Southsea surrounding Albert Road, Palmerston Road, and Osborne Road contain many bars, restaurants and independent shops. Palmerston Road is the main High Street of Southsea and contains various shops and restaurants, as well as the local library, and Southsea Community Cinema and Arts Centre. Albert Road is a distinct street containing shopping and cultural venues, which include the Wedgewood Rooms and Kings Theatre, a regional theatre built in 1907.

Southsea retains its own post town status (PO4 and PO5), even though the actual town of Southsea was merged into Portsmouth in 1904.

== History ==
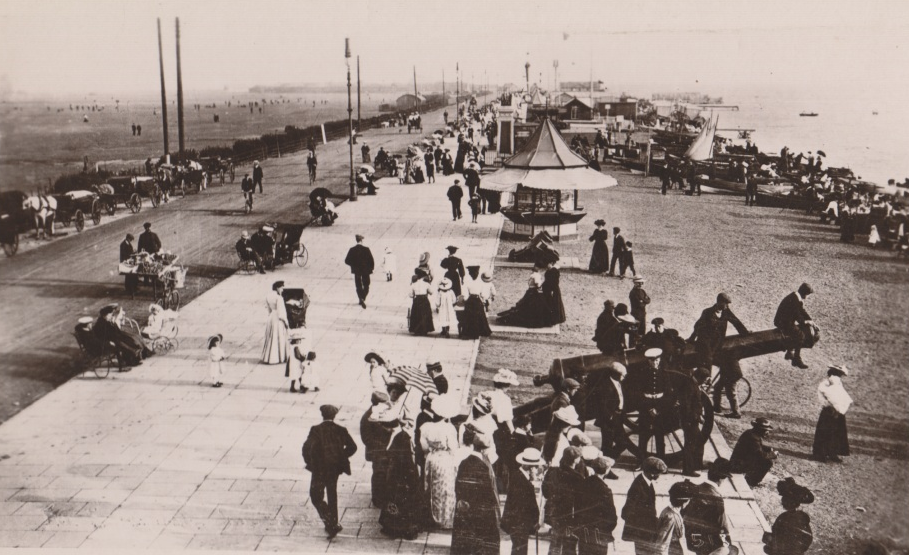
Southsea Front and Common c. 1905

The history of Southsea is generally part of the history of Portsmouth, as Southsea started with the growth of Portsmouth dockyard and of the city, with the expansion of British maritime power during the British Empire. Before the 16th century Southsea was principally composed of small farms, open grassland and undrained marshland (morass), outside the main naval base and the city itself. However the growing expectation of a possible French attack on the naval base led Henry VIII to order the building of Southsea Castle in 1544, adjacent to the channel approaches to Portsmouth Harbour. Southsea was first recorded as a place name in a Royal plan in 1577. Henry VIII visited Southsea Castle in 1545, from where he witnessed the sinking of the warship Mary Rose in the Solent.

The first references to the development of the suburb appear in the Portsea Poor Rate returns of 1790 and describe small areas of building and farming plots. Most of the land was undeveloped and open grass and marshland still dominated the area. In the early 19th century, development continued on land owned by Thomas Croxton, and the community became known as Croxton Town. The first houses were built by 1809 for skilled workers in what were called the "mineral" streets (such as Silver Street and Nickel Street). Around 1810, streets such as Hampshire Terrace, Landport Terrace, King's Terrace, Wish Street (which later became King's Road and Elm Grove), Jubilee Terrace and Bellevue Terrace were built adjacent to the old walls of the city. Although the streets still exist, many of them were among the most heavily bombed areas of Portsmouth in the Second World War, and like much of Southsea they experienced significant redevelopment in Postwar Britain.

The development of Southsea continued during the Napoleonic era and as the dockyard continued to grow, new homes were required for the increasing personnel, and many houses, villas and apartments were built. The architect and builder Thomas Ellis Owen created many of these, and the surviving buildings retain a coherent late Georgian and early Victorian style, and form a conservation area today, with many of the buildings having listed status. Owen built properties in Kent Road, Queen's Terrace, Sussex Terrace, Elm Grove, Beach Road, Grove Road South, Clarendon Road, Osborne Road and Portland Terrace. The area between Castle Road and Victoria Road South was built up between 1835 and 1860. In 1851 St Jude's CofE church was built on Kent Road to a design by Thomas Ellis Owen.

During the same period, Southsea grew as a leisure and bathing destination. In 1816 a pump room and baths were erected near the present day Clarence Pier, and by 1820 a large complex was developed including vapour baths, showers, and card playing and assembly rooms. The remaining marshland, known locally as The Great Morass was drained, leading to the creation of Southsea Common, some 480 acres (about 2 km^{2}) of open grassland. Due to military requirements for clear lines of fire adjacent to Southsea Castle, the area was developed and remains today as a park and garden. Apartments and hotels were constructed towards the common and waterfront, along Southsea Terrace, Western Parade and Clarence Parade. The first large hotel was the Portland Hotel (destroyed in the Second World War) near Kent Road. Others soon followed, including the purpose-built Queens Hotel (1861), Pier Hotel (1865) and Beach Mansions Hotel (1866). In 1852 the Clarence Esplanade and a memorial were erected by public subscription, and development of the resort led in 1861 to Clarence Pier being constructed as a promenade pier and landing place for steamers. In August 1874, a series of riots broke out over access to a section of Southsea beach. Lasting over 4 days, this became known as the "Battle of Southsea". The Riot Act was eventually invoked with soldiers from the 9th Regiment dispersing the crowd from Southsea Common. Other piers were also built, including the Victoria and Albert Piers, with the construction of South Parade Pier in 1879 marking the culmination of seafront development in the Victorian period.

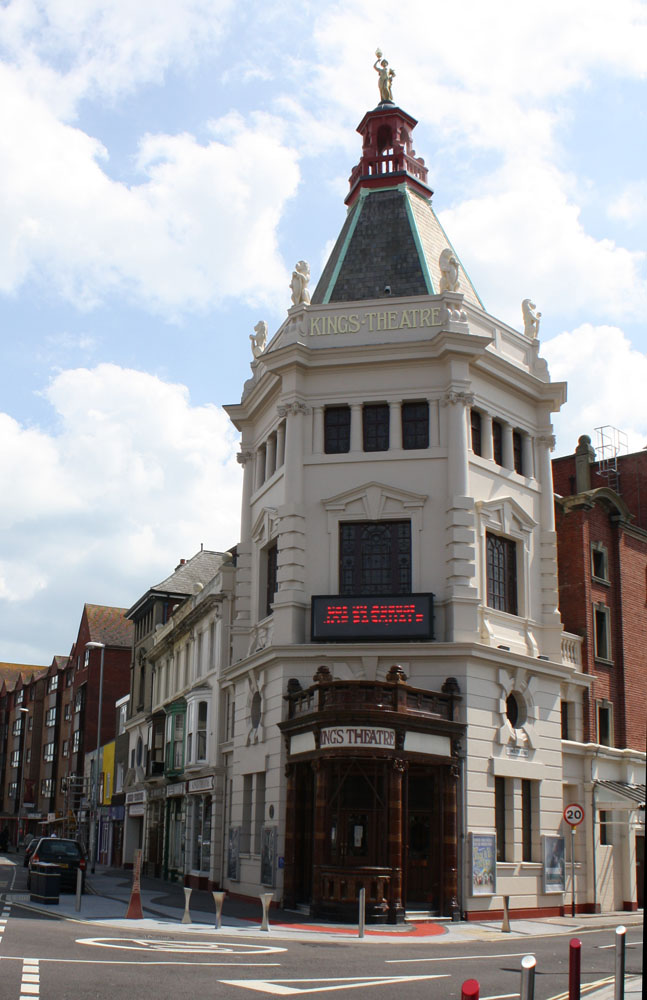
Kings Theatre

By the 1860s the suburb of Southsea had grown along Clarendon Road as far as Granada Road. In 1857 Southsea gained its own Improvement Commissioners responsible for paving, street cleaning and public lighting. The Southsea Railway came in 1885 and brought further development to the area, although it was to be financially unsuccessful and eventually closed in 1914. By the mid to late Victorian era, Southsea had become recognised as a largely middle-class neighbourhood, with many naval officers and other professionals taking up residence. During this time the writer Sir Arthur Conan Doyle lived in Portsmouth, moving to Southsea in June 1882 with less than £10 (£1000 today) to his name. He set up a medical practice at 1 Bush Villas in Elm Grove, Southsea. Areas of Southsea suffered from the rapid development of the suburb; certain streets suffered from poverty and there was a major cholera outbreak in 1848. The works of the commission helped bring about some improvements and eventually led to the setting up of the Southsea Improvement Association.

=== 20th century ===
Southsea continued to grow eastwards in the early 20th century, extending to the area of Eastney. During this time significant local public buildings were constructed including the Queens Hotel, in the Edwardian Baroque style built in 1903 and the Kings Theatre built in 1907. The onset of World War I saw an increase in fortifications on the seafront. Parades were held on Southsea Common. Southsea continued to thrive as a resort destination and a suburb of Portsmouth in the inter-war years, with many visitors in summer. At that time parts of the Common were converted into ornamental gardens and the Ladies' Mile was set out in 1925. However World War II had an immense impact on the urban and social fabric of the area. Huge areas of Southsea were destroyed by bombing during The Blitz. Although some of Victorian Southsea escaped the bombing, areas such as the Kings Road and Elm Grove were extensively damaged and the Palmerston Road shopping areas were completely destroyed. The beachfront, piers and promenades were closed for the duration of the war. Following the end of the war, in 1945 Southsea and the rest of Portsmouth embarked on a massive clearance and rebuilding scheme. Many areas of destroyed, damaged and intact low-income housing were cleared to make way for new building schemes. The Kings Road Estate and Roslyn House, among others, were developed between 1945 and the 1970s. Palmerston Road shopping area was developed in the 1950s and still stands today. Although visitor numbers to the resort area never recovered, Southsea continued to develop throughout the 20th century and today remains a mixed residential area and leisure destination.

=== Recent history ===
On 15 September 2000, parts of Southsea were flooded when a month's worth of rain fell in 12 hours. The Eastney pumping station then failed due to the flood water. On 9 August 2011 a fire broke out at the former Joanna's Nightclub, then derelict and later demolished, opposite South Parade Pier. A contemporary local newspaper report states that the incident was not linked to then-ongoing riots.

== Southsea Common ==
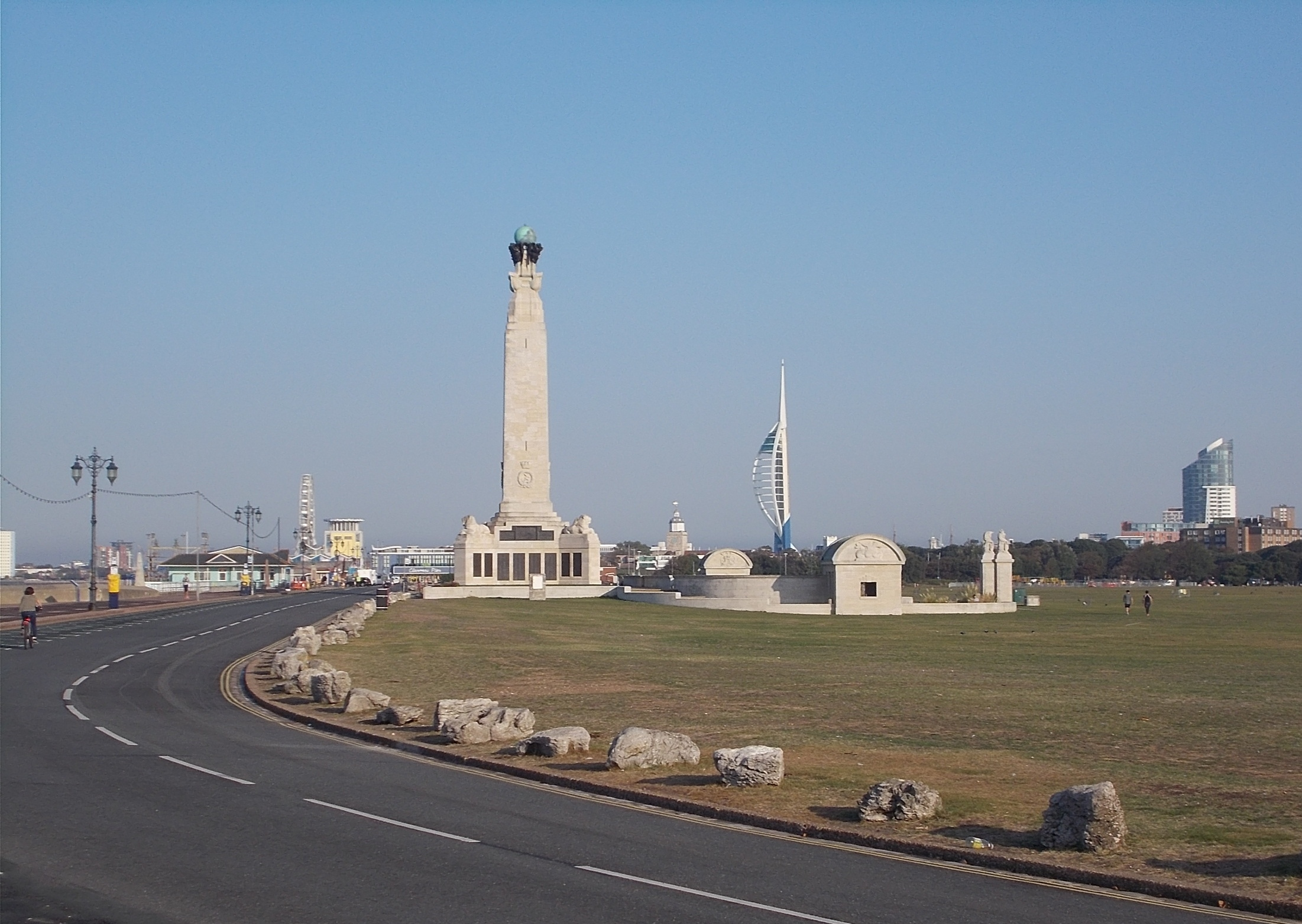
Southsea Common and Portsmouth Naval Memorial.

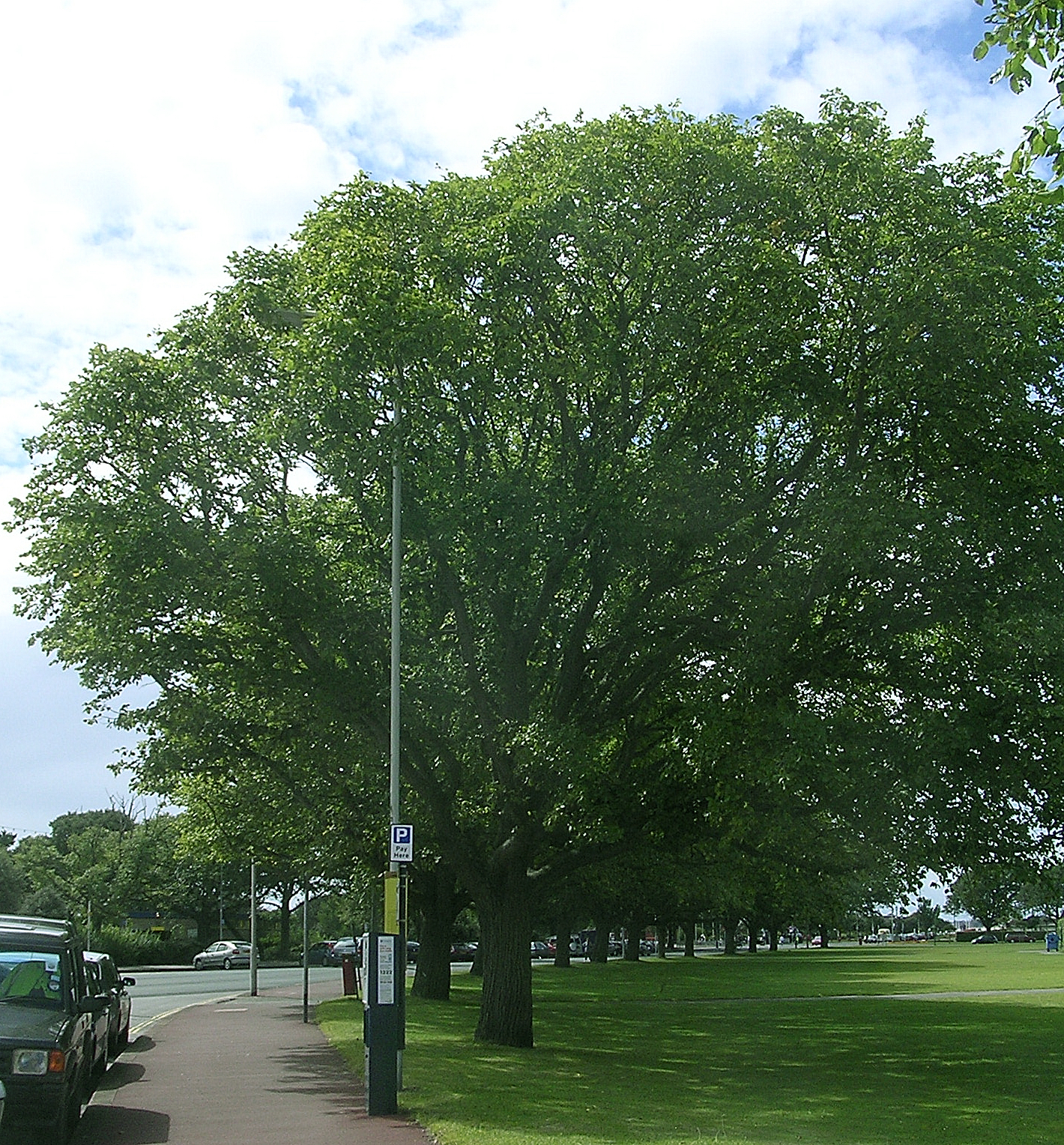
Row of wind-pruned Huntingdon Elms, Southsea Common

Southsea Common is a large expanse of mown grassland parallel to the shore from Clarence Pier to Southsea Castle. The Common owes its existence to the demands of the military in the early nineteenth century for a clear range of fire from the harbour defences at any enemy ships which dared to approach Portsmouth and its dockyard. In 1874, the Southsea Pier Company closed public access to part of Southsea beach which lead to four days of rioting. These riots became known as the "Battle of Southsea". The police and army eventually dispersed the crowd but the development plans were abandoned.

The common is a popular recreation ground, and also serves as the venue for a number of annual events, including the Southsea Show, Para Spectacular, Military Vehicle Show, Kite Festival, Victorious Festival and a variety of circuses including the Moscow State Circus and Chinese State Circus. It was also the place where fans of Portsmouth F.C. gathered to celebrate their victory in the 2008 FA Cup Final. It also hosts the annual Portsmouth Pride celebrations, where in 2024 an estimated 20,000 people were in attendance. The Portsmouth Pride dates for 2025 is on 7 June 2025, starting at The Briny restaurant.

On 6 June 1994 a drumhead service was held on Southsea Common in front of the Portsmouth Naval Memorial to commemorate the 50th anniversary of D-Day. The service was attended by all the heads of the states which had participated in the allied landings, notably HM Queen Elizabeth II and US President Bill Clinton. The service was also witnessed by over 100,000 members of the public. Historically, a blessing before battle was offered during a drumhead service which is conducted in the field with the drums forming the altar and the colours serving as the altar cloth.

On 28 June 2005 the Common was a venue for the Trafalgar 200 celebrations, the seafront an ideal point from which to witness the International Fleet Review and evening firework display.

In August 2010, "Ultrasauros", a life-size (52 ft high) model of an ultrasauros dinosaur was erected on the common in conjunction with the Portsmouth's Aspex Gallery. The sculpture was destroyed by a fire, thought to have been caused by an electrical fault, on 1 October.

In 2013 Victorious Festival moved from the Portsmouth Historic Dockyard to Southsea Common. The annual festival was extended to a 3-day event in 2017.

In September 2013, it was announced that a new Parkrun would begin along Southsea seafront in October 2013. As of February 2025 the Southsea Parkrun has hosted 525 events with an average finish time of 28 minutes and 50 seconds.

In July 2015 and 2016 Southsea Common hosted the America's Cup World Series sailing event. The British sailing team Land Rover BAR is based in nearby Old Portsmouth.

=== Trees ===
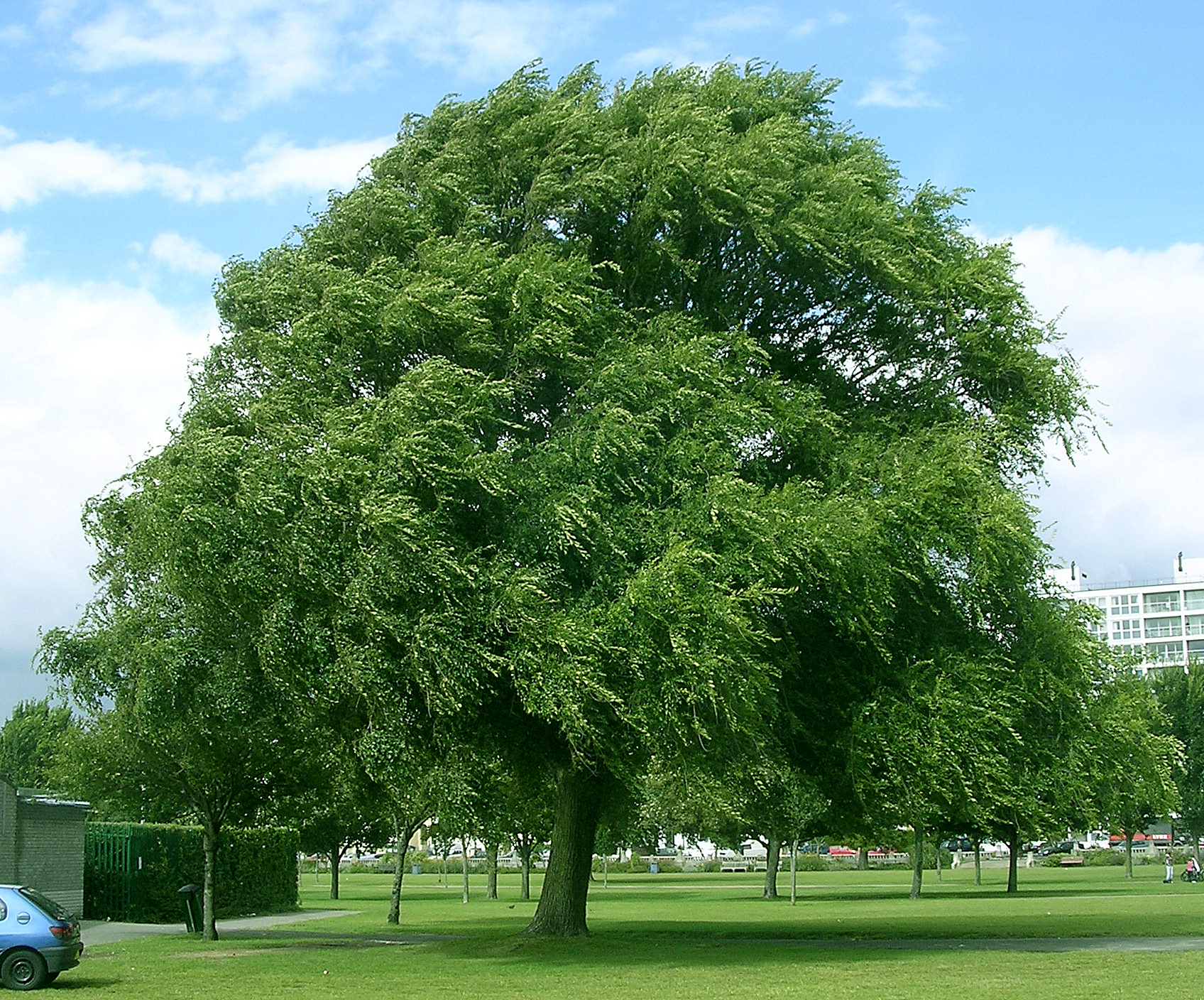
Ulmus pumila hybrid

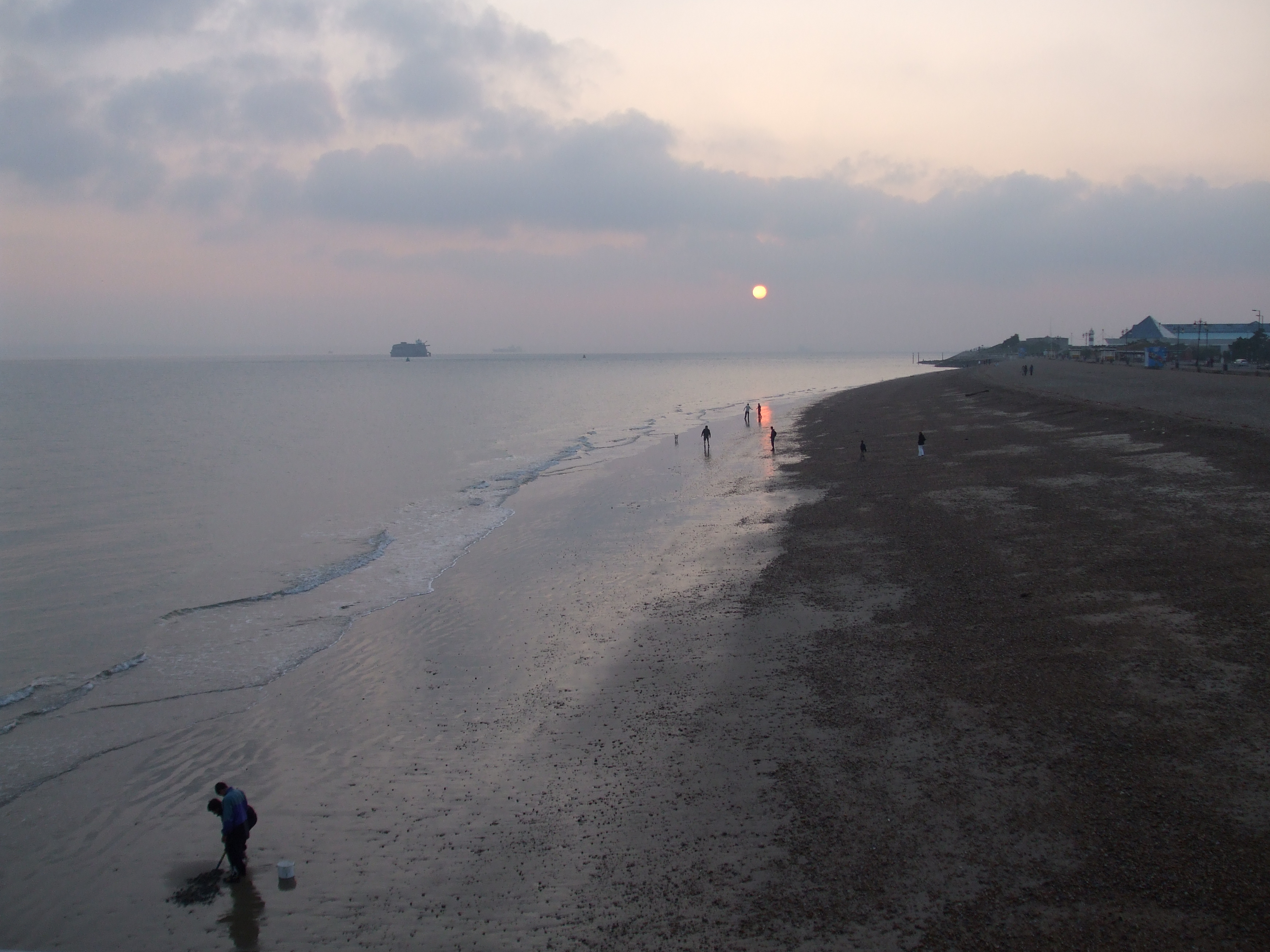
Southsea Beach

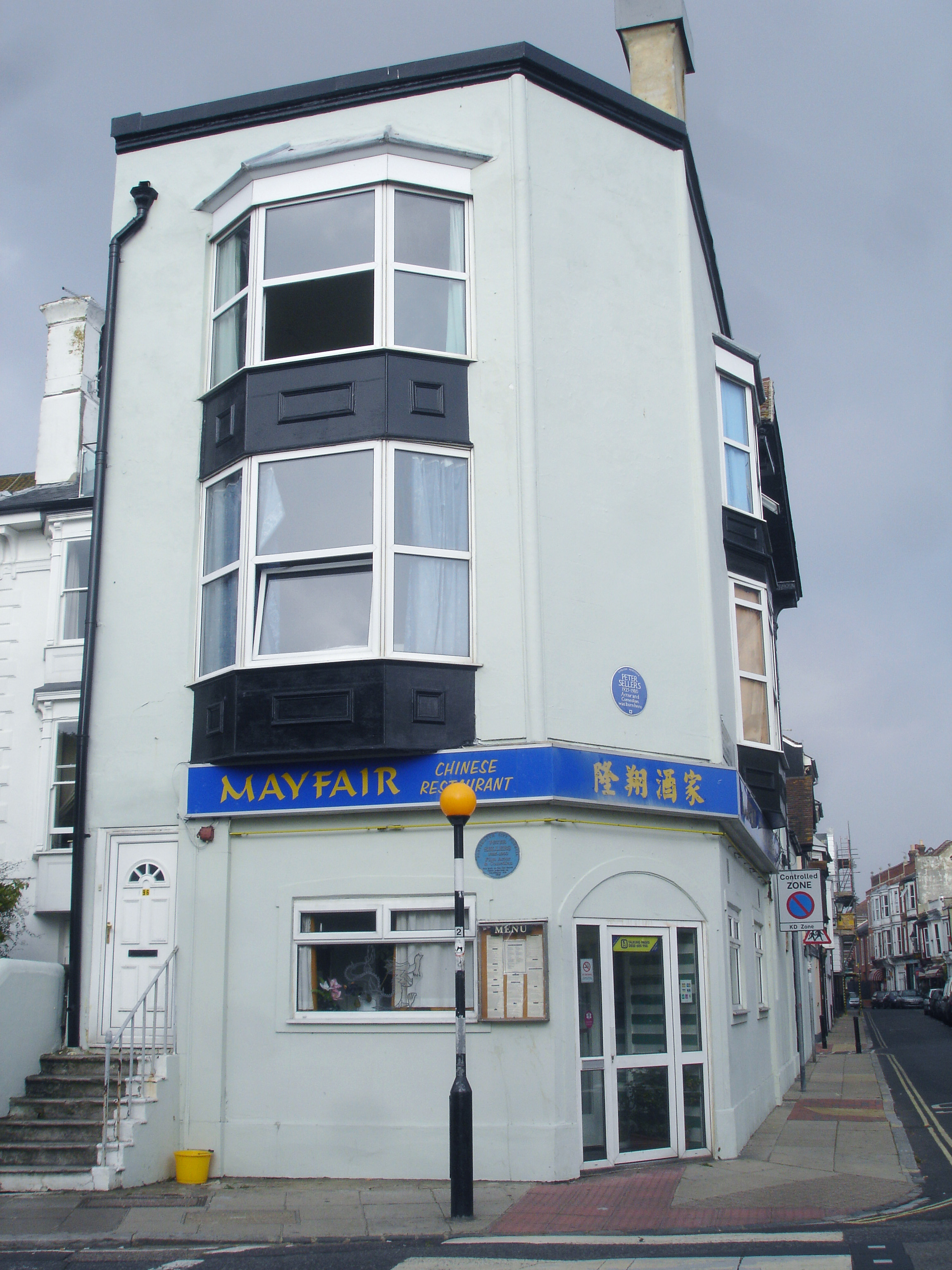
Peter Sellers' birthplace on the corner of Castle Road and Southsea Terrace. The blue plaques read "Peter Sellers, Actor and Comedian was born here"

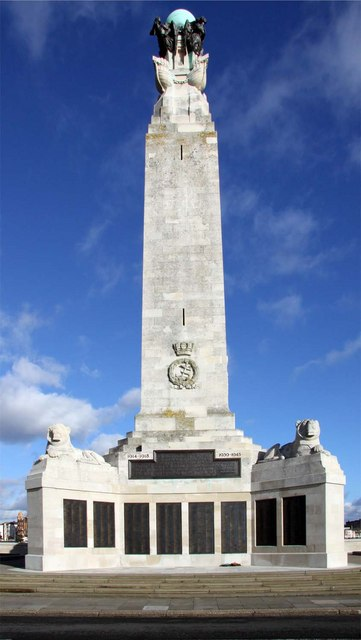
Portsmouth Naval Memorial, Southsea

The common is home to a collection of mature elm trees, believed to be the oldest and largest surviving in Hampshire, which have escaped Dutch elm disease owing to their isolation. The majority of the larger trees are Huntingdon Elms planted in the 1920s, but nearer the entrance to the Skate Park there is a fine example of a hybrid of the Siberian Elm Ulmus pumila. Huntingdon Elms once lined the Ladies' Mile—an avenue through the centre of the Common—but many were lost in the Great Storm of 1987 and replaced by the Dutch hybrid elm cultivar 'Lobel'.

The Ladies' Mile is also home to several semi-mature Canary Island date palms Phoenix canariensis. Planted in 1996, these palms are now some of the largest in the UK and for the last few years have fruited and produced viable seed, the first time this species of palm has been recorded doing so in the UK. Other palms growing close to the Common include Trachycarpus fortunei, (Ladies' Mile, Rock Gardens and Rose Garden), Chamaerops humilis (in front of the Pyramids Centre), Butia capitata (in Burgoyne Gardens) and Brahea armata, (Canoe Lake and D-Day Island). Many Cordyline australis are also planted in the area, though these are not true palms, but more closely related to yuccas and agaves.

== Tourist attractions ==
=== Seafront ===
- Southsea beach is mostly flint gravel, but with sand exposed at low tide. There are two piers: South Parade Pier and Clarence Pier; both house amusement arcades. South Parade Pier also contains a ballroom and a bar area. Clarence Pier is adjacent to a permanent amusement park.
- There are a number of miniature golf courses, Southsea Skatepark, and public grass and clay tennis courts. During winter 2008 three beach volleyball courts were added to these attractions.
- The Blue Reef Aquarium is situated on the seafront.
- Just off the seafront is Southsea Model Village which is a 1/12 scale model village with forty miniature buildings, houses, forts, castles and a miniature railway. It was opened in 1956 in part of Lumps Fort. The other part of the Fort has been converted into Southsea Rose Garden.

=== Historical features ===
- A prominent sight out to sea are the four large round forts created in the 1860s as part of an attempt to fortify the city against the threat of invasion. They formed part of defences which included land-based forts around the city. The forts were never used in action and became known as Palmerston's Folly, after the Prime Minister who initiated them.
- To commemorate the millennium, the Millennium Promenade was created extending to Gunwharf Quays from Southsea seafront. The walkway is marked on the pavement, and is lined by distinctive blue street lanterns.
- English Heritage blue plaques commemorating notable figures in Southsea include Lieutenant Norman Holbrooke VC, Fred T Jane, Rudyard Kipling, Thomas Ellis Owen, Peter Sellers, Commander Edwin Unwin VC, and Dame Frances A Yates.

=== Canoe Lake ===
Canoe Lake is the last remnant of an area of marsh and open water known as the Great Morass, drained in 1886, on which much of Southsea now sits. The lake is topped up from the sea by a sluice gate at high tide. Some marine wildlife can be spotted in the lake, including fish, crabs, moon jellyfish, and reportedly even small sharks.

Mute swans and mallard can be seen regularly, with less frequent visits from tufted duck, Mediterranean gull, cormorant, little grebe and occasionally a lone feral black swan. Pedalos can be rented on the lake in the summer.

Since 2006 Canoe Lake has been a venue for the Lake of Lights Memorial Service, held each December, when thousands of lights are floated on the lake to commemorate loved ones in the local community who have been lost to cancer.

=== Performing arts ===
- The Kings Theatre on Albert Road hosts a variety of performances, including productions by the local amateur group the Southsea Shakespeare Actors.
- There are regular open-air concerts and events at the bandstand and on Castle Field, including Victorious Festival held on Southsea Common during the August bank holiday.
- "Love Albert Road Day" was an annual event in Southsea. The event featured live music, street art and theatre, stalls, food from around the world, an outdoor cinema, competitions and skate demos. Businesses along Albert Road remained open for the day. The first event was held in 2007 when it was expected 2000 visitors would attend and 20,000 turned up on the day. The second "Love Albert Road Day" was held on 28 September 2008 when 40,000 visitors attended.

=== Museums ===
- The D-Day Story (which holds the Overlord Embroidery) is located on the seafront in Southsea close to Southsea castle.
- Cumberland House natural history museum contains a butterfly house.
- Toward the eastern end of the seafront is the Royal Marines Museum. Based in the lavishly decorated former Officers' Mess of Eastney Barracks (built in the 1860s for the Royal Marine Artillery), the museum includes The Making of the Royal Marines Commando exhibition, opened in 2008, and a refurbished Medal Room with over 8,000 medals earned by Royal Marines.

=== Albert Road ===
Albert Road is a well known road of the hosts a range of independent bars, restaurants, cafes and live music venues. It also hosts a range of cultural events. It is also houses the Kings Theatre and Wedgewood Rooms.

=== Map mural ===
A large map of the area was painted on the side of a house at the junction of Waverley Road and Clarendon Road, in 1997-1998. Due to water damage it was removed, the wall rendered and a new version painted in 2010. The artist, Mark Lewis, acquired a 99 year lease on the wall to ensure the mural's longevity. In 2021 the celebrated map mural received a £5,000 grant to maintain and update it.

== Climate ==
Southsea features a mild oceanic climate (Köppen: Cfb) that borderlines the warm-summer Mediterranean climate (Csb), with warm summers and relatively mild, damp winters. Due to its southerly location and sheltering of northerly winds from Portsdown Hill, Southsea enjoys one of the mildest winters in the United Kingdom, and experiences higher temperatures than areas surrounding it, as well as higher sunshine hours. Summers tend to be warm with fewer extreme high temperatures than other areas in the South East of England.

Climate data for Southsea, Portsmouth 1976–2005
Month	Jan	Feb	Mar	Apr	May	Jun	Jul	Aug	Sep	Oct	Nov	Dec	Year
Mean daily maximum °C (°F)	9.6 (49.3)	8.8 (47.8)	10.6 (51.1)	13.4 (56.1)	16.8 (62.2)	19.4 (66.9)	21.8 (71.2)	21.8 (71.2)	19.3 (66.7)	15.8 (60.4)	12.0 (53.6)	10.0 (50.0)	14.9 (58.9)
Mean daily minimum °C (°F)	5.1 (41.2)	4.3 (39.7)	5.4 (41.7)	6.4 (43.5)	9.6 (49.3)	12.3 (54.1)	15.0 (59.0)	15.0 (59.0)	12.8 (55.0)	10.9 (51.6)	7.5 (45.5)	5.9 (42.6)	9.2 (48.5)
Average precipitation mm (inches)	65 (2.6)	50 (2.0)	52 (2.0)	42 (1.7)	28 (1.1)	40 (1.6)	32 (1.3)	43 (1.7)	62 (2.4)	81 (3.2)	72 (2.8)	80 (3.1)	647 (25.5)
Average rainy days	11.2	9.5	8.3	7.6	6.5	7.4	5.4	6.6	8.5	10.9	10.3	11.2	103.4
Mean monthly sunshine hours	67.9	89.6	132.7	200.5	240.8	247.6	261.8	240.7	172.9	121.8	82.3	60.5	1,919.1
Percentage possible sunshine	26	31	36	49	51	51	54	54	46	38	31	25	41
Source 1: Met Office
Source 2: BADC

== Southsea Town Council ==
On 1 April 1999 following a successful submission to the UK Government under the Local Government and Rating Act 1997 Southsea became a civil parish. The Parish Council later became the Southsea Town Council. At the 2001 census (the last before the abolition of the parish), Southsea had a population of 18,514.

The initial creation of the town council was opposed by Portsmouth City Council. There was a long-standing campaign to disband the town council. In a poll of local residents in February 2010, 66.3 per cent voted to abolish it. The parish was abolished on 23 April 2010. It is now in the unparished area of Portsmouth.

The town council had limited powers and a small budget funded by the local precept. It campaigned on local issues, seeking to influence the unitary authority Portsmouth City Council, awarded funds to local causes and funded infrastructure improvements in the local area. Until 2007 it had a small office open to the public in Southsea town centre.

== Transport links ==
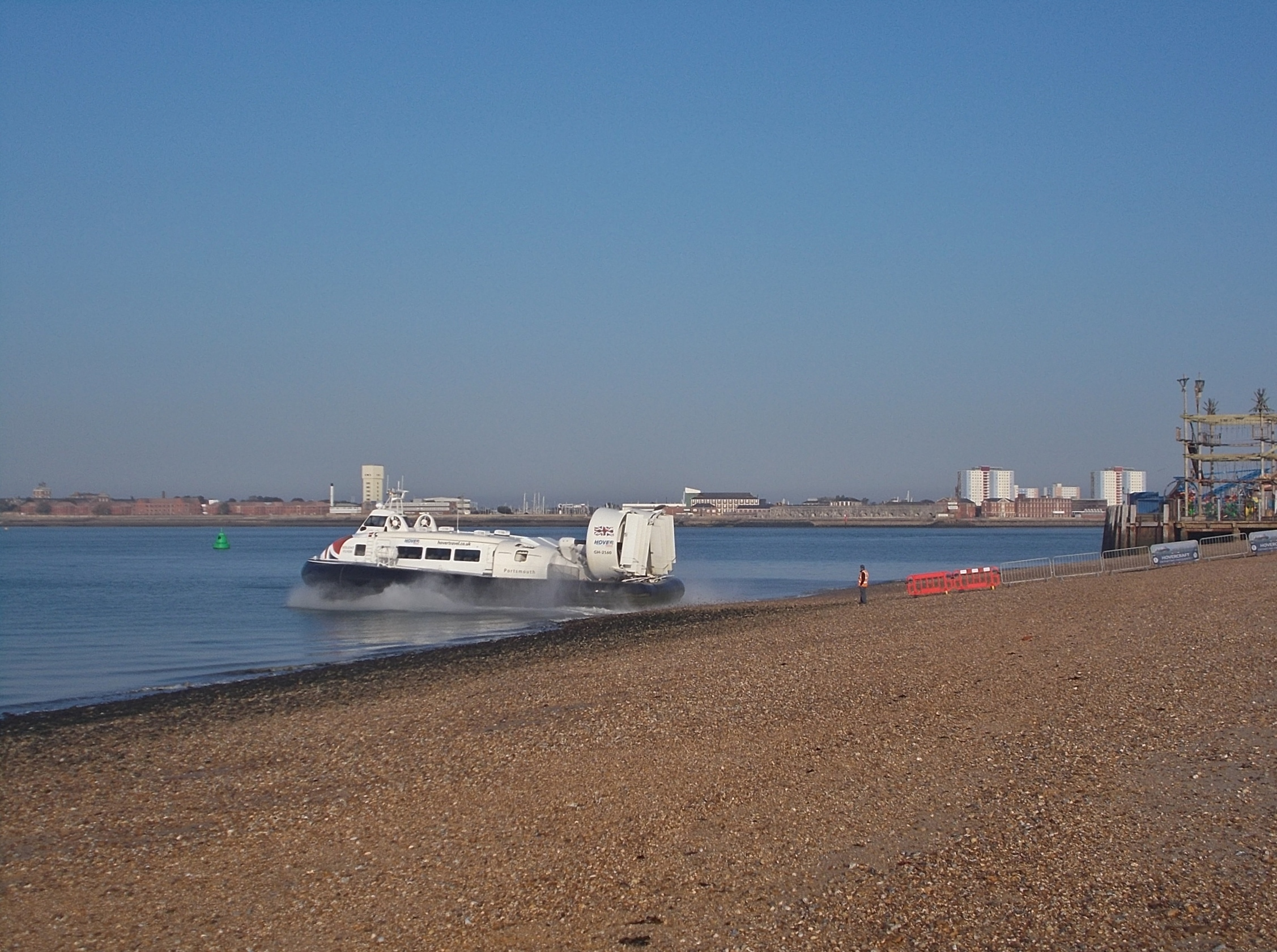
Solent Flyer hovercraft leaving Southsea bound for Ryde

Hovertravel operates a regular hovercraft service to Ryde on the Isle of Wight from Southsea seafront. In Southsea, this runs from the Southsea Hoverport.

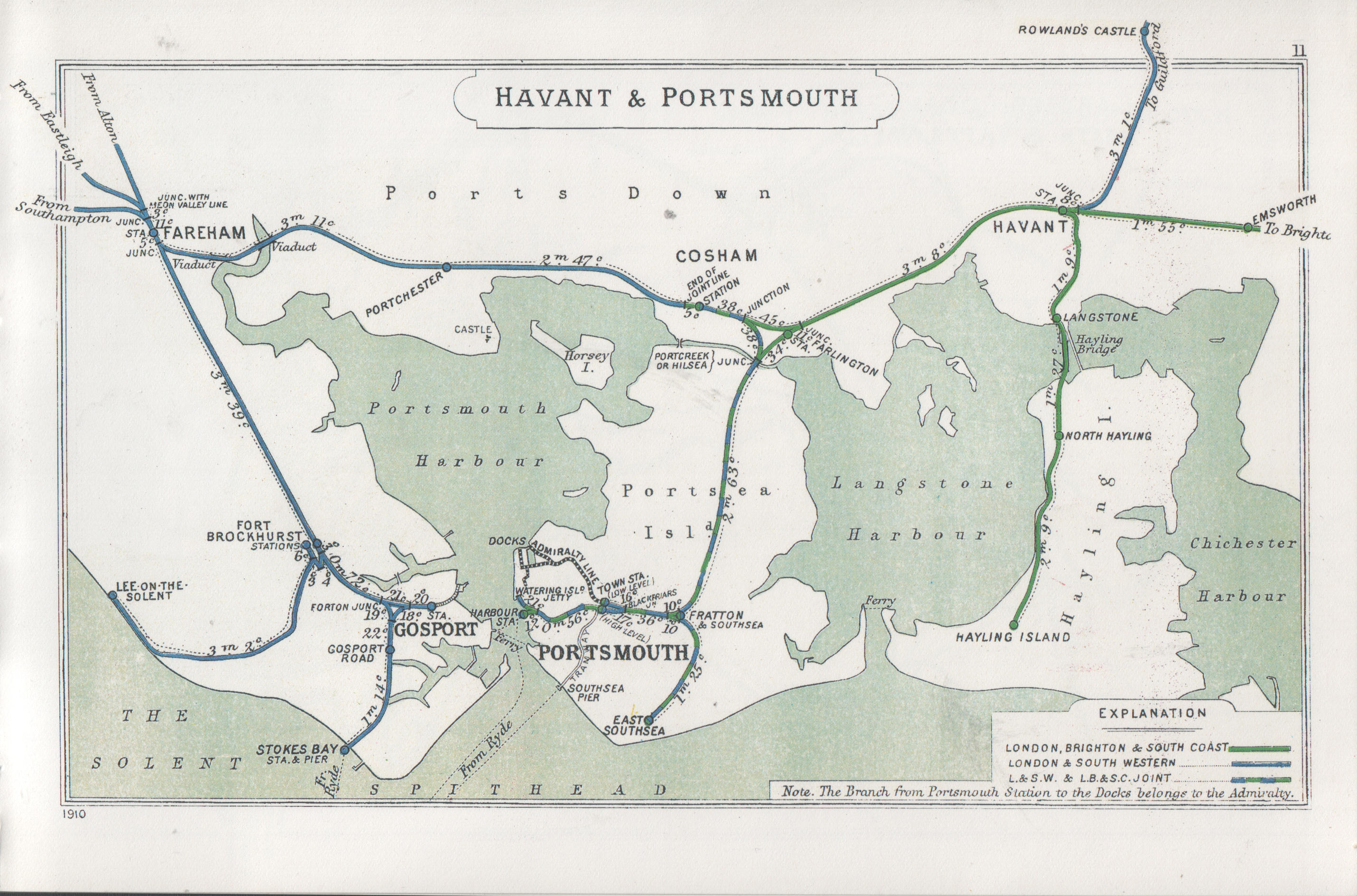
A 1910 Railway Clearing House map of lines around Portsmouth, showing the Southsea Railway

In 1898 a railway branch called the Southsea Railway was opened from platform 3 at Fratton Station, terminating at East Southsea Station (near to The Strand). Two unstaffed halts were added at Albert Road and Jessie Road/Devonshire Avenue. The line was not able to compete with the Portsmouth corporation tram services. It was closed in 1914 and never re-opened. The line itself and the station have since been demolished and replaced with houses. Southsea is now served by stations at Fratton and Portsmouth and Southsea station and on to Portsmouth Harbour (also called The Hard), with regular trains to London Waterloo and London Victoria.

There is a Hayling Island Ferry service linking Eastney and Ferry Point, on Hayling Island.

== Education ==
- University of Portsmouth
- Priory School
- Trafalgar School
- Mary Rose Academy
- Portsmouth Grammar School
- Portsmouth High School
- Mayville High School
- St John's College
- Ark Charter Academy

== People ==
- General Sir Evelyn Barker, British Army general
- Isambard Kingdom Brunel, engineer
- Sir Arthur Conan Doyle, writer and creator of Sherlock Holmes
- Basil Hall Chamberlain, writer and Japanologist
- Marie Engle, American singer
- Houston Stewart Chamberlain, philosopher
- Edward Fegen, Victoria Cross recipient
- Reginald Fulljames, aviator, cricketer, Military Cross recipient
- Robert Gittings, writer
- Lewis Hancox, graphic novelist, social media personality and filmmaker
- Lancelot Hogben, zoologist
- Brian Howe, singer
- Jim Al-Khalili, scientist
- Rudyard Kipling, writer
- Tomasz Schafernaker, BBC weather presenter
- Peter Sellers, actor
- Jeffrey Steele, artist
- H. G. Wells, writer
- Dame Frances Amelia Yates, historian
- Paul Jones, singer
- Peter Coke, Soldier; playwright; artist; radio star.

== Sport ==
Southsea is the birthplace of underwater hockey. The town is home to the UK's most successful club, winning 21 out of 53 national championships as of 2023, in addition to 16 out of 36 Nautilus Tournaments as of 2022.
