= Jessie Road Bridge Halt railway station =

Disused railway station in England

Coordinates: 50.792697°N 1.068521°W

Jessie Road Bridge Halt

General information
- Location: Southsea, City of Portsmouth; England
- Grid reference: SZ657996
- Platforms: 1

Other information
- Status: Disused

History
- Opened: 1 October 1904; 121 years ago
- Closed: 8 August 1914; 111 years ago
- Original company: Southsea Railway
Location

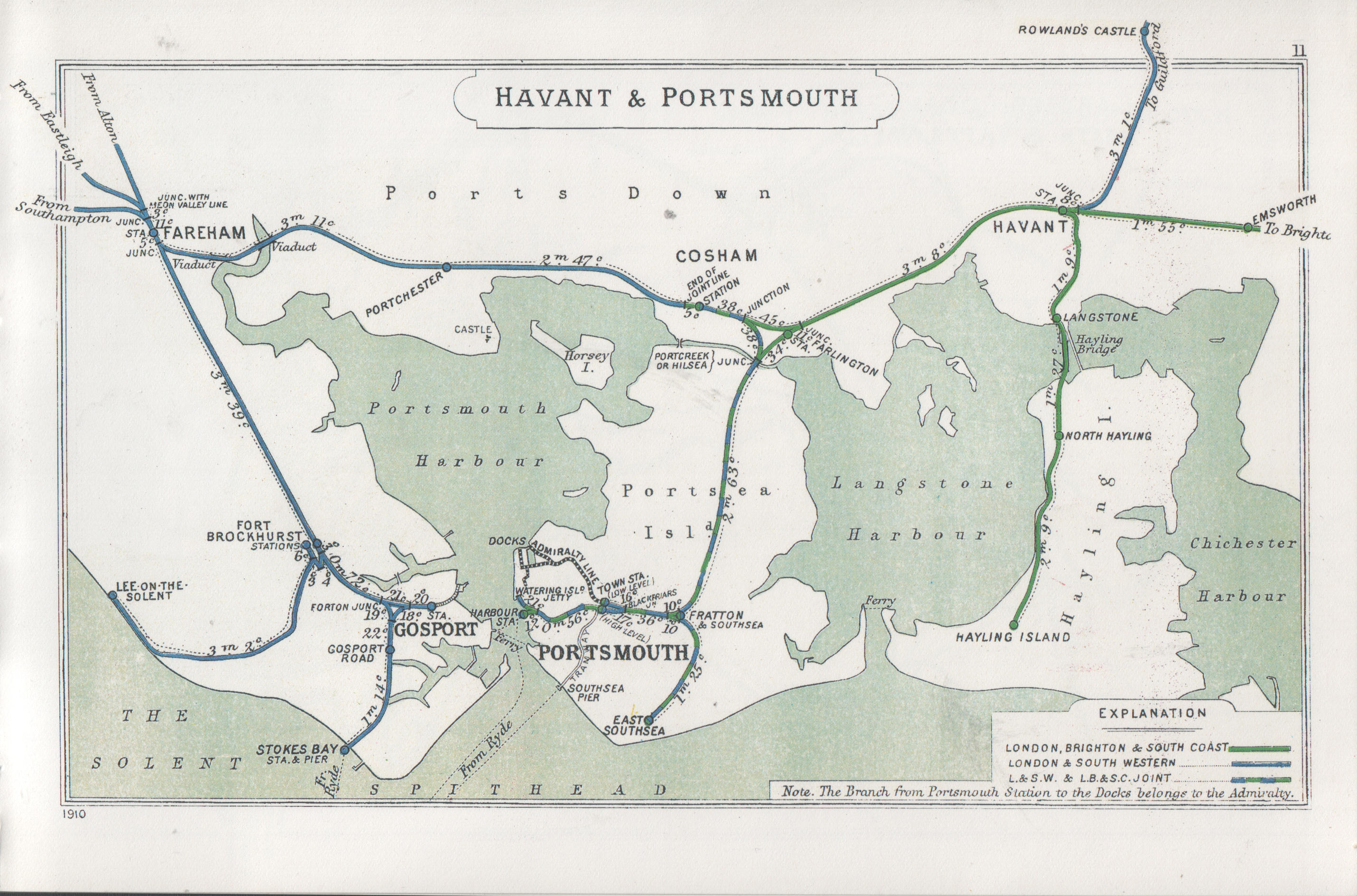
A 1910 Railway Clearing House map of lines around Portsmouth, showing the Southsea Railway

Jessie Road Bridge Halt was an intermediate station situated on the Southsea Railway between Fratton and Albert Road Bridge Halt (sometimes called Highland Road).

Opened in 1904 and closed a decade later it was part of a concerted effort to boost revenue and thus see off competition from the burgeoning tramway network. The station's only platform was on the down line, the up line being out of use. The final nail in the line's coffin was a government directive issued shortly after the declaration of war that railways unable to support themselves would cease operations at the earliest opportunity; and, as the line clearly fell into this category, the last train ran early in August 1914.

Preceding station	Disused railways	Following station
Fratton	Southsea Railway	Albert Road; Bridge Halt

== See also ==
- List of closed railway stations in Britain
