= Southsea Railway =

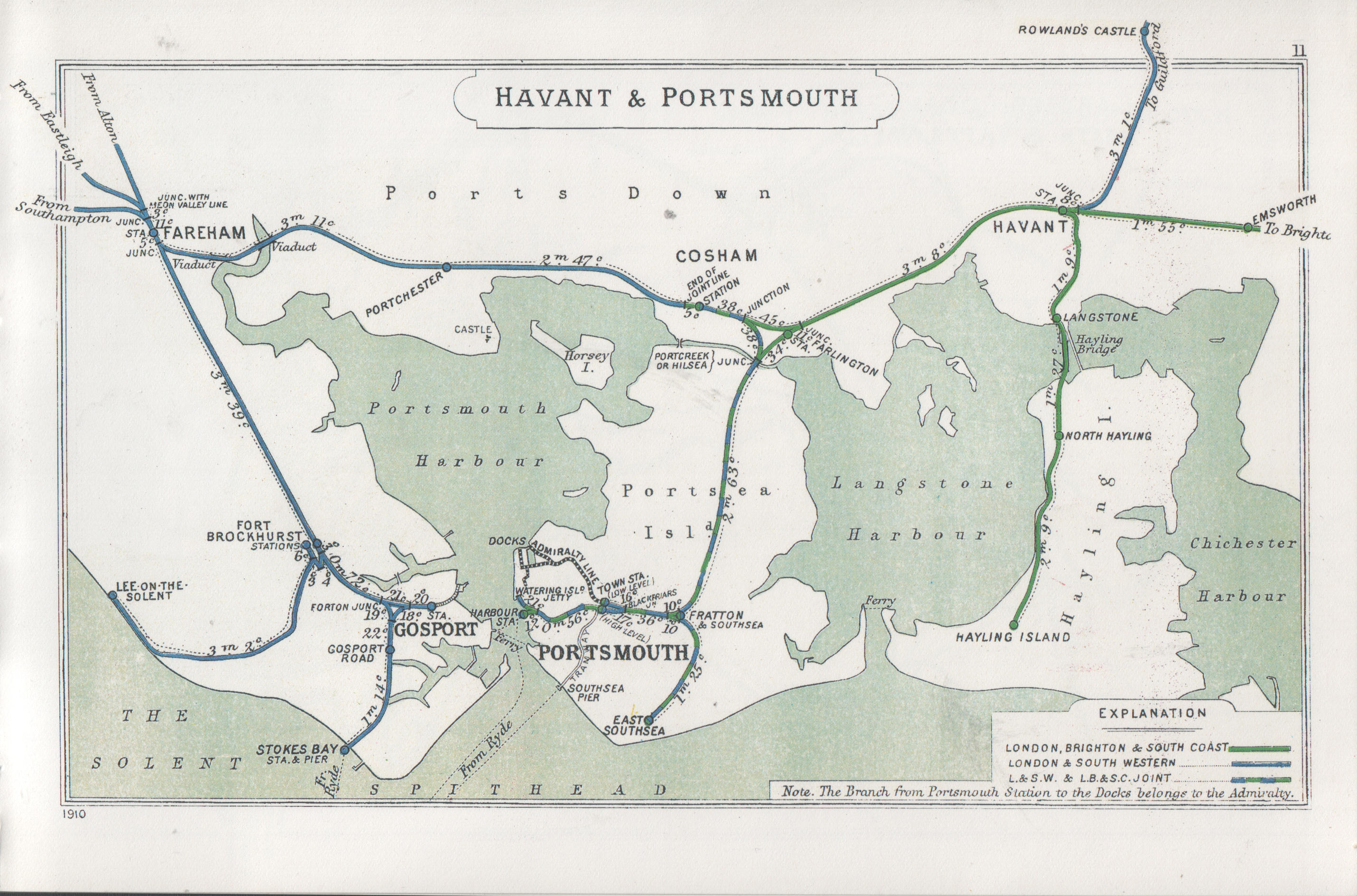
A 1910 Railway Clearing House map of lines around Portsmouth, showing the Southsea Railway

The Southsea Railway was a short railway branch line. It was built to give easier access from the jointly operated main line railway approaching Portsmouth to the Clarence Pier from which Isle of Wight ferries sailed. In 1879 the extension of the main line railway to Portsmouth Harbour station, where direct transfer from train to steamer was possible, eliminated most of the steamer business at Clarence Pier. Undeterred, promoters interested in developing Southsea projected the Southsea Railway, connecting a new Fratton station on the main line, with Southsea. The line was opened on 1 July 1885. Its independent promoters believed that it could be a main line terminus for London trains, and they constructed the line lavishly in consequence.

The line helped the development of Southsea as an affluent residential district, but the short transit, and the complication of changing trains at Fratton to reach Portsmouth by train, diminished the attractiveness of the line. The later development of electric street running tramways in Portsmouth and Southsea, adversely affected its commercial viability. In 1903 railmotor operation was attempted to reduce costs, but the railmotor vehicles were unsatisfactory and the loss of the steamer passenger traffic meant that the line was beyond saving. It closed completely on 6 August 1914.

== History ==
=== First railways in Portsmouth ===
In 1845 the Brighton and Chichester Railway, an offshoot of the London and Brighton Railway, got authority to extend its line to Portsmouth. Those two companies later merged with others in 1846 to form the London, Brighton and South Coast Railway. At the time the London and South Western Railway was also planning a railway into Portsmouth, at first from its Gosport line at Fareham. The two companies agreed to work together, and the line within Portsea Island was made joint. It opened on 14 June 1847. The Portsmouth station was a terminus, at the east side of Commercial Road.

=== First tramway ===
In later decades, leisure travel to the Isle of Wight became increasingly important, and the Portsmouth station was about a mile (1 1/2 km) from the ferry berth at Broad Street, and from Victoria Pier. Getting from the station to the ferry with luggage was difficult in the extreme, due to traffic congestion. Southsea Pier, on the south side of Portsea Island was opened in 1861 and soon renamed Clarence Pier. It was hoped that the pier made the transfer from train to ferry easier, as it avoided the busiest part of Portsmouth, but its distance from the station was about the same; from 15 May 1865 the Landport and Southsea Tramway Company started operation between the station and Clarence Pier.

The Landport and Southsea Tramway Company's operation had the effect of developing interest in Southsea as a residential location, and in time it became a popular middle-class area. In 1866 a local man named Edwin Galt promoted the idea of a branch railway connecting Southsea to Portsmouth station, but the LBSCR and the LSWR distanced themselves from the scheme, seeing it as abstractive. Although the proposal obtained an authorising act of Parliament, the Southsea Railway Act 1867 (30 & 31 Vict. c. cxciv) on 12 July 1867, it failed to get built due to lack of share subscription, and the proposal was officially abandoned by the Southsea Railway (Abandonment) Act 1869 (32 & 33 Vict. c. xciii).

=== A railway scheme promoted once again ===
In 1876 the main line railway was extended from the Portsmouth terminus to Portsmouth Harbour. There was a direct transfer to the Isle of Wight ferries, and this was immensely more convenient for most travellers, so that as a result Clarence Pier reduced in popularity as a ferry terminal, and the tramway lost business correspondingly.

Galt and his partners revived a scheme for a Southsea Railway in 1878; at first it was to run from a junction station at Copnor, running south beside the main line until diverging. Galt intended this to permit the operation of through trains from London: if he was to encourage family travel to the Isle of Wight to use his line and the Clarence Pier, he wanted to avoid the necessity of a change of trains at the junction station.

Southsea Railway Act 1880
- Act of Parliament
- Parliament of the United Kingdom
- Long title: An Act to incorporate a Company for the Construction of the Southsea Railway; and for other purposes.
- Citation: 43 & 44 Vict. c. cciii

Dates
- Royal assent: 26 August 1880

Text of statute as originally enacted

Southsea Railway Act 1883
- Act of Parliament
- Parliament of the United Kingdom
- Long title: An Act to confer further powers on the Southsea Railway Company for the construction of new and the completion of their authorised Railways and to confirm an Agreement between that Company and the London and South Western Railway Company; To provide for the abandonment of certain Roads authorised by the London Brighton and South Coast Railway (Various Powers) Act 1882; and for other purposes.
- Citation: 46 & 47 Vict. c. clx

Dates
- Royal assent: 2 August 1883

Other legislation
- Amends: London Brighton and South Coast Railway (Various Powers) Act 1882

Dedicated through trains seemed excessive, and in conflict with the main line companies’ own services, and they persuaded Galt to alter the junction to a new station at Fratton instead. (Station Road in Copnor was built in anticipation at the time, and is extant now.) This scheme was authorised by the Southsea Railway Act 1880 (43 & 44 Vict. c. cciii) of 26 August 1880; authorised share capital was £50,000. Raising share capital again proved difficult, but in 1882 the LSWR subscribed enough to enable a start to be made. A decision had evidently been taken to modify the route, and a further act of Parliament, the Southsea Railway Act 1883 (46 & 47 Vict. c. clx) of 2 August 1883 authorised the change.

The line was to be double track, 1 mile 24 chains (2,092 m) long. The terminus at Granada Road, Southsea had three platforms and the terminal buildings were said to be in the Queen Anne style on a lavish scale: Grant still intended this to be a main line terminus. However the LSWR agreed only to provide a trailing connection at Fratton into a loop platform, so that direct through passenger operation to the main line system would not be possible.

In the preparations for the parliamentary bill, the main line railways agreed to provide the necessary junction station at Fratton, but only if the land was given free, and approach roads each side were made and paid for locally.

The contract price for construction of the line was £55,000, awarded to John Mackay of Hereford.

=== Opening and operation ===
The line was opened ceremonially on 1 July 1885 by Lady Ada Willis, wife of General Sir George Willis, Lieutenant Governor, Portsmouth. Fratton station was opened on the same day.

Within a year the line was sold to the LSWR and LBSCR jointly for £74,905, authorised by the South Western Railway (Various Powers) Act 1883 (46 & 47 Vict. c. clxxxix) of 20 August 1883, and taking effect on 1 July 1885. They agreed to work the line in alternate years. The train service consisted of 15 trains each way daily, of which six had through coaches to and from London. From 5 July 1885 all main line trains without exception stopped at Fratton to make connections.

In May 1896 the name of the Southsea terminal was changed to East Southsea, recognising that Fratton and Portsmouth stations were nearer to many parts of Southsea. At first the line seemed to be profitable, but the urban street tramway system in Portsmouth and Southsea developed considerably in the final decade of the nineteenth century, and the conversion to electric operation (from horse-drawn trams) produced a very considerable upsurge in tram usage, and a consequent decline in use of the Southsea Railway.

=== Financial difficulties ===
In 1902 the branch ticket income was £287, while working expenses were £2,149. The joint committee considered urgent cost saving measures, and these included singling the line, abolishing signalling, and issuing tickets on the train, by the guard. In addition the companies decided on the use of railmotors instead of conventional trains. The Southsea terminal would be transferred to more modest premises nearby. In addition, new intermediate stopping places were opened in 1904, at Jessie Road and Albert Road. These proved to be rough platforms with shacks as waiting rooms.

== Railmotors ==
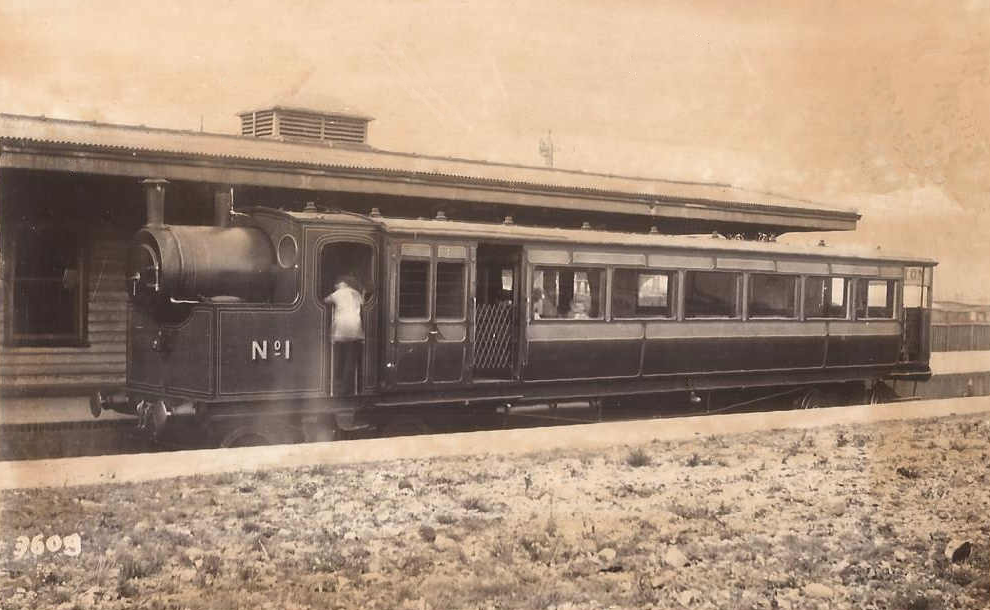
LSWR railmotor No. 1 at Fratton

The LSWR evidently did not own any railmotors at this stage; indeed the steam railmotor was the first of its kind in the country, so two were designed by Dugald Drummond and manufactured at Eastleigh Works specifically for the line.

Railcar no 1 was carried on two bogies, a motor bogie and an ordinary bogie; each had solid centre wheels 2 feet 9 inches (84 cm) in diameter and with a wheelbase of eight feet (2.4 m). The boiler was of the vertical type with vertical and cross tubes, but it was replaced with a boiler of conventional type. The new boiler had an outside diameter of 16 1/2 inches (42 cm) and was 3 ft 6 in (1.07 m) long. The grate area was 6 3/4 square feet (6,300 cm^{2}) and the two cylinders driving on the leading wheels were seven inches (18 cm) in diameter by 10 inches (25 cm) stroke. Electric bell communication was provided between the car and the driver's cab. The coach provided accommodation for ten first class passengers on upholstered longitudinal seats, and 32 third class passengers on rush top seats, arranged laterally with the gang way between. All entrances and exits were closed by trellis gates. The driver's rear compartment had the normal controls. Car No. 1 started running on Whit Monday 1 June 1903.

Car No. 2 was 50 feet (15 m) in length overall and had cylinders 10 inches (25 cm) diameter by 14 in (36 cm) stroke. The motor bogie wheels were 3 feet (91 cm) in diameter and the tractive effort of the engine was 3,889 pounds (1,764 kg).

During testing of the first, it was obvious that its boiler had poor steam-raising capability, and modifications were carried out. The first run of a railmotor on the branch took place on 1 June 1903, a twenty-minute interval service being maintained all day. The railmotors were a failure and after the day's work on 9 June they were removed and sent to Nine Elms for modification.

After improvements to the boilers of both railcars, they were returned to service, probably in June 1904. They were still inadequate on the busiest trains, and had to be assisted by conventional steam locomotives. Urgent modifications and fitting of a better design of boiler improved matters.

The railmotors were jointly owned, but from the beginning of 1906, the two owning companies changed to operating the line on a five-year cycle.

=== Closure ===
Although these measures had some beneficial effect on the financial situation, arrested the financial decline initially, the availability and convenience of tramcars meant that the line was uncompetitive. At the outbreak of World War I the emergency measures imposed by government included instructions to the railway companies that unremunerative branch lines should be suspended; the closure took effect on 8 August 1914.

Although the line was used for military storage during the war years, it was announced in 1919 that the line would remain closed. It was not until 1923 that the Southern Railway obtained the Southern Railway Act 1923 (13 & 14 Geo. 5. c. lxxxiii) authorising abandonment of the railway.

== Route of the line ==
The course of the line may easily be inferred from subsequent street alignments: it left Fratton station in an eastward direction, and curved to the south on the north and east side of Heidelberg Road and east of Bath Road; it then followed St Ronans Road on the south-east side to the junction of Granada Road and Waverley Road.

In more detail that may be described as follows. After its closure, the route of the Southsea Railway line was mostly redeveloped for housing, although its distinctive curved route can still be traced on a modern street map of present-day Portsmouth, and compared with period maps of the early twentieth century.

The site of Southsea's terminus station is now occupied by a modern residential cul de sac named Chewter Close, just to the north of Granada Road in Southsea. The original 1885 terminus station building was located at the northern end of today's Chewter Close until its demolition in the 1970s. A mural commemorating the station was unveiled on the northernmost wall in Chewter Close on 26 August 2011, although this wall was not part of the original station and was built as a boundary wall between new houses in Parkstone Avenue and the garage business which continued to use the station building until its demolition in the 1970s. The smaller, later East Southsea station site is now occupied by modern houses close to the road junction of Chewter Close and Granada Road.

Immediately to the north of Chewter Close, the Southsea Railway line followed the route of today's Parkstone Avenue, a mid-twentieth-century development of semi-detached houses that covered the southern end of the line. To the north of Parkstone Avenue, the railway route passed through a bridge cutting under the eponymously named Old Bridge Road.

The route of the former Southsea Railway continued northwards in a narrow cutting between St. Ronan's Road and Craneswater Avenue, now filled and occupied by housing. Further to the north, the line ran alongside the eastern side of Craneswater School and passed through the Albert Road bridge cutting (since demolished and filled in). The route is now covered by a small school car park, games courts and turfed playing fields, this land previously had an Odeon ('Salon' from 1977) cinema built on it in 1937 before closure and demolition in 1985.

Through the Albert Road bridge cutting, the line passed under what is now 253 Albert Road, a dry-cleaners store. Beside this, at 251 Albert Road, the railway passed alongside a building once called the Gaiety Cinema, which has since been converted into a modern-day Co-op supermarket. The shape of the Co-op building's east side wall still follows the same angle as the former railway line route.

Following the route north from Albert Road, there is now Festing Mews, a collection of lockup garages built over the Southsea Railway line route. Continuing northwards, the route passed through what is now Pepys Close, a row of twentieth century bungalows.

North of Pepys Close, a brick wall now blocks the route northwards into a wide present-day back alleyway that passes between the backs of terraced houses in Bath Road and St. Augustine Road. The Southsea Railway line once passed through this alleyway and emerged at today's expanded Devonshire Avenue, the former location of Jessie Road Bridge Halt railway station. A road bridge was formerly built above this station, and connected Jessie Road in the west to Devonshire Avenue in the east. A turfed island in the centre of the present-day Devonshire Avenue marks the location of the eastern half end of the demolished bridge.

North of Devonshire Avenue, the Southsea Railway route began its northwest arc to link with Fratton railway station. The arc originally followed directly behind the back of terraced houses in Heidelberg Road, and then to the north of house fronts in Francis Avenue. The original railway route is now covered by the extended Fernhurst Road and the addition of Chestnut Avenue. The houses in these newer roads are of a later style to those found in Heidelberg Road and Francis Avenue.

From the north side of Francis Avenue, the Southsea Railway line then travelled beneath an earth-bank road bridge built at an angle over the top of Goldsmith Avenue and down into Fratton railway station. The bridge, since demolished, once occupied land on Goldsmith Avenue which presently has a large modern Lidl supermarket on it. The supermarket replaced an earlier Danepak Bacon building, built after the bridge and Southsea Railway route were demolished.

North of the Goldsmith Avenue bridge, the Southsea Railway route once terminated at its own dedicated covered platform island at Fratton railway station, south of the main station buildings and platforms. The island was built just to the east of the main Fratton station overhead footbridge, which previously had a flight of stairs leading down to the Southsea Railway's island platforms. This island at Fratton station was demolished after the Southsea Railway line closed, a modern train washing facility now occupies the site.

== Gallery ==
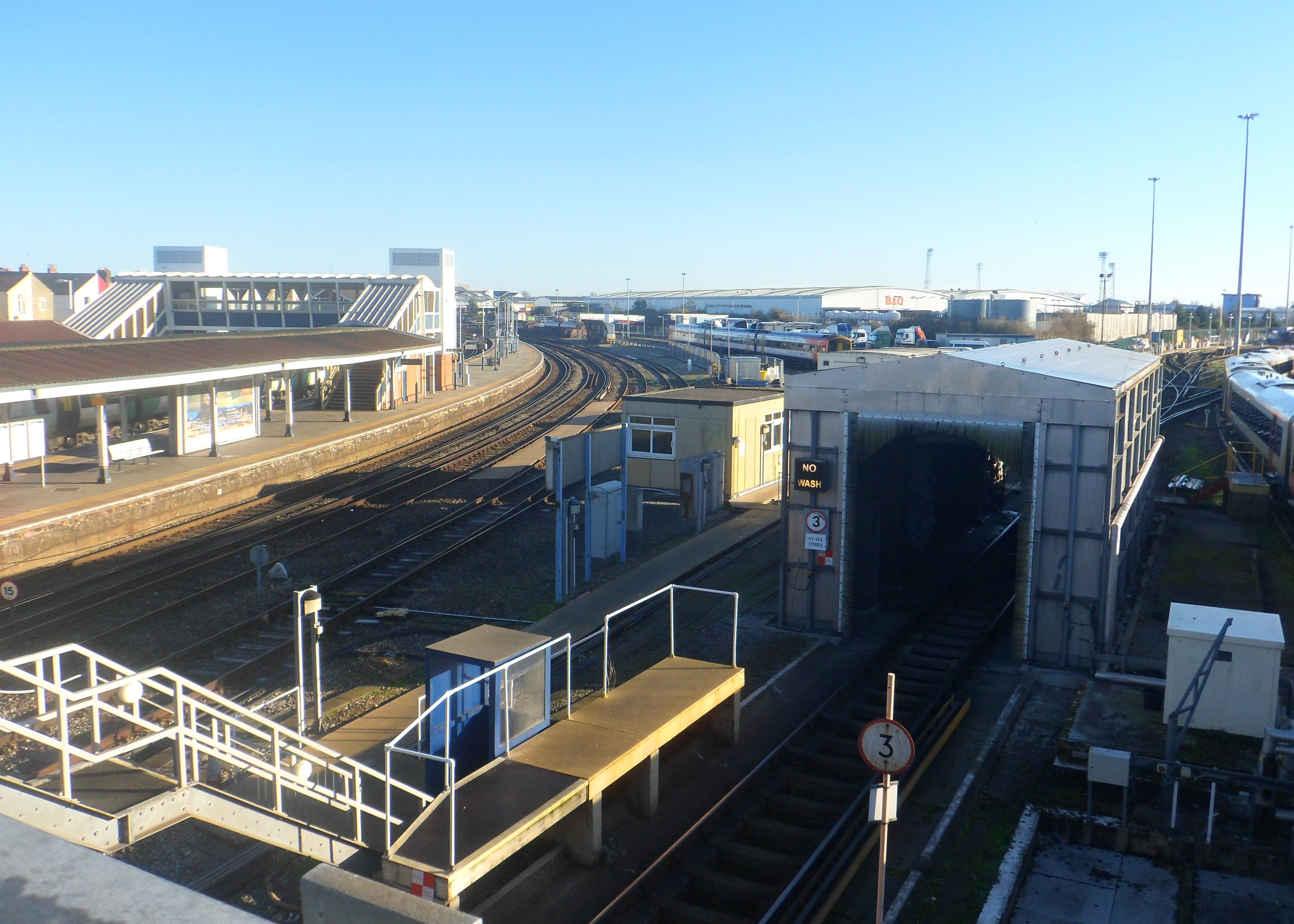
The Southsea Railway departed Fratton Station from a dedicated island platform, now the present-day location of a modern train washing machine.

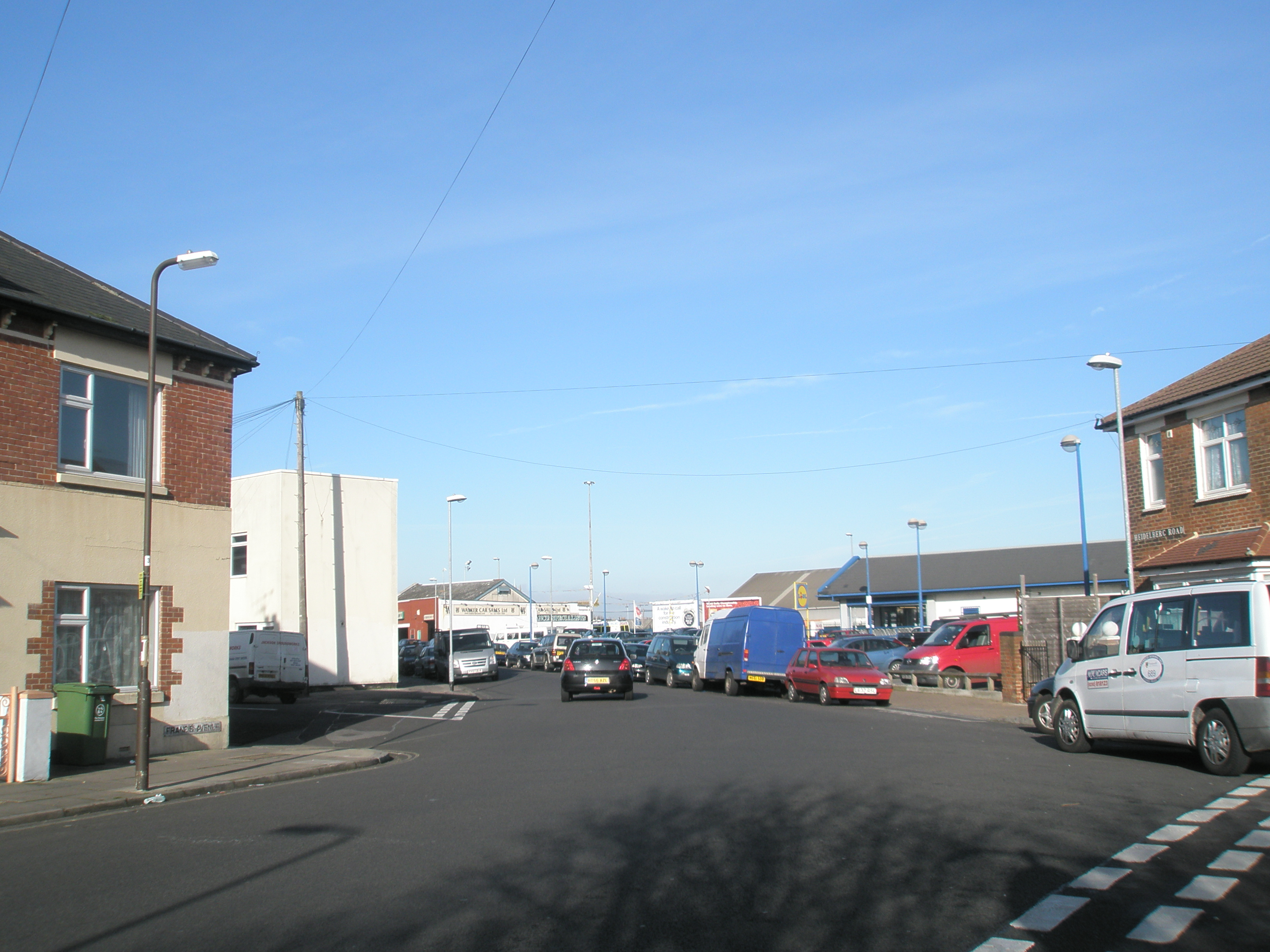
The route crossed Goldsmith Avenue on a bridge before curving round Francis Avenue and behind Heidelberg Road.

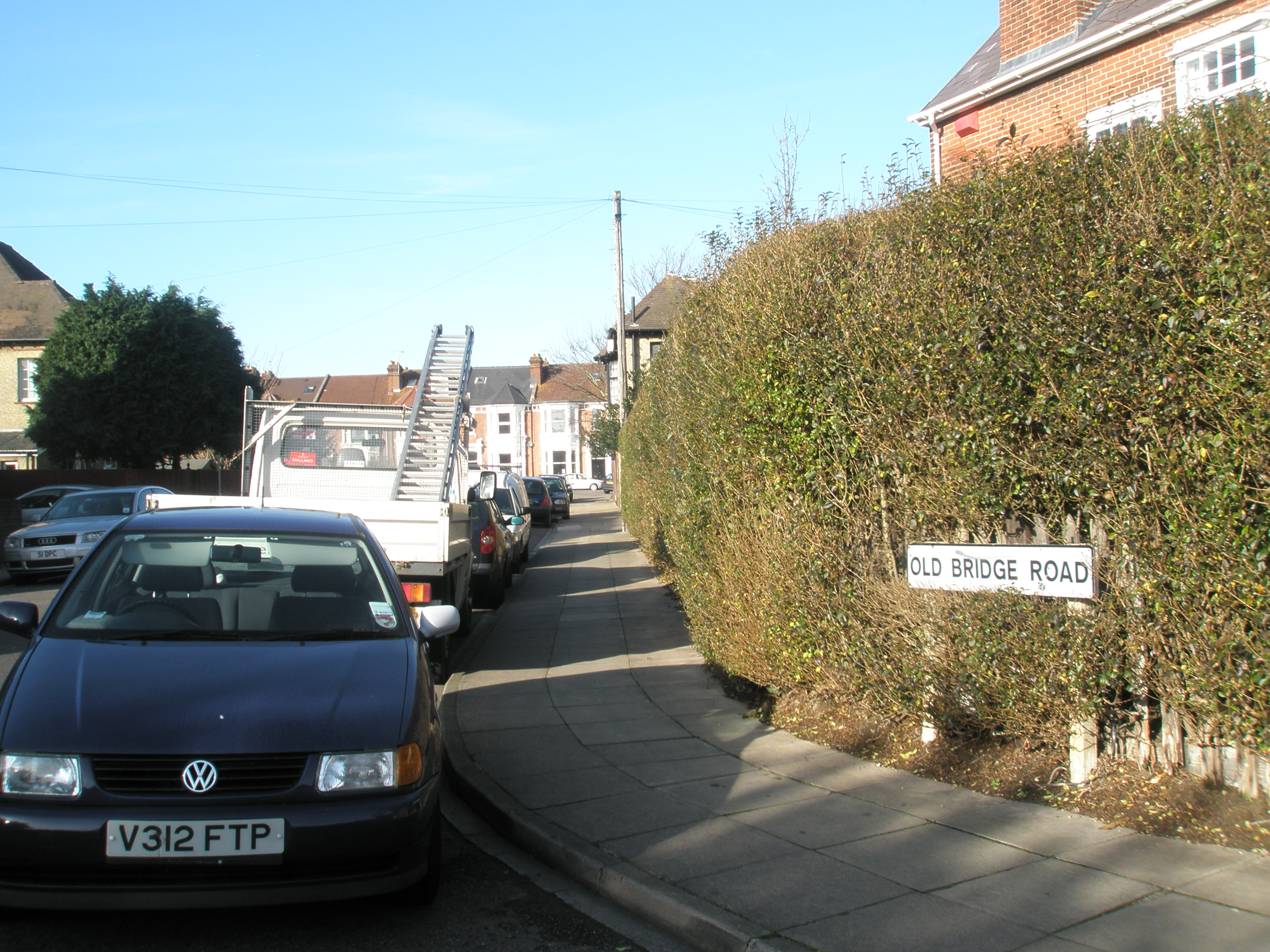
Old Bridge Road in Southsea, which carried the Southsea Railway

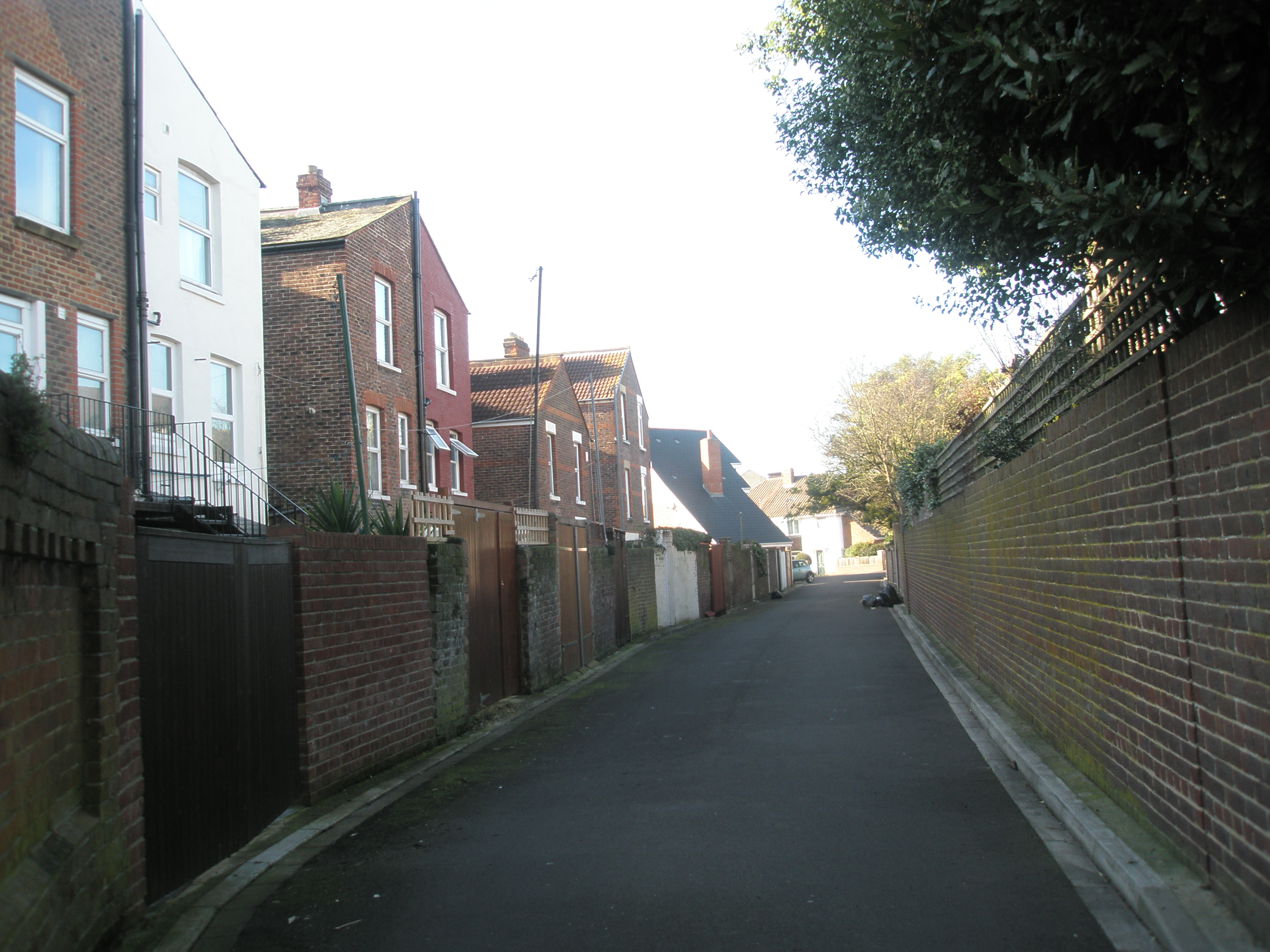
until it approached the terminus just north of Granada Road.

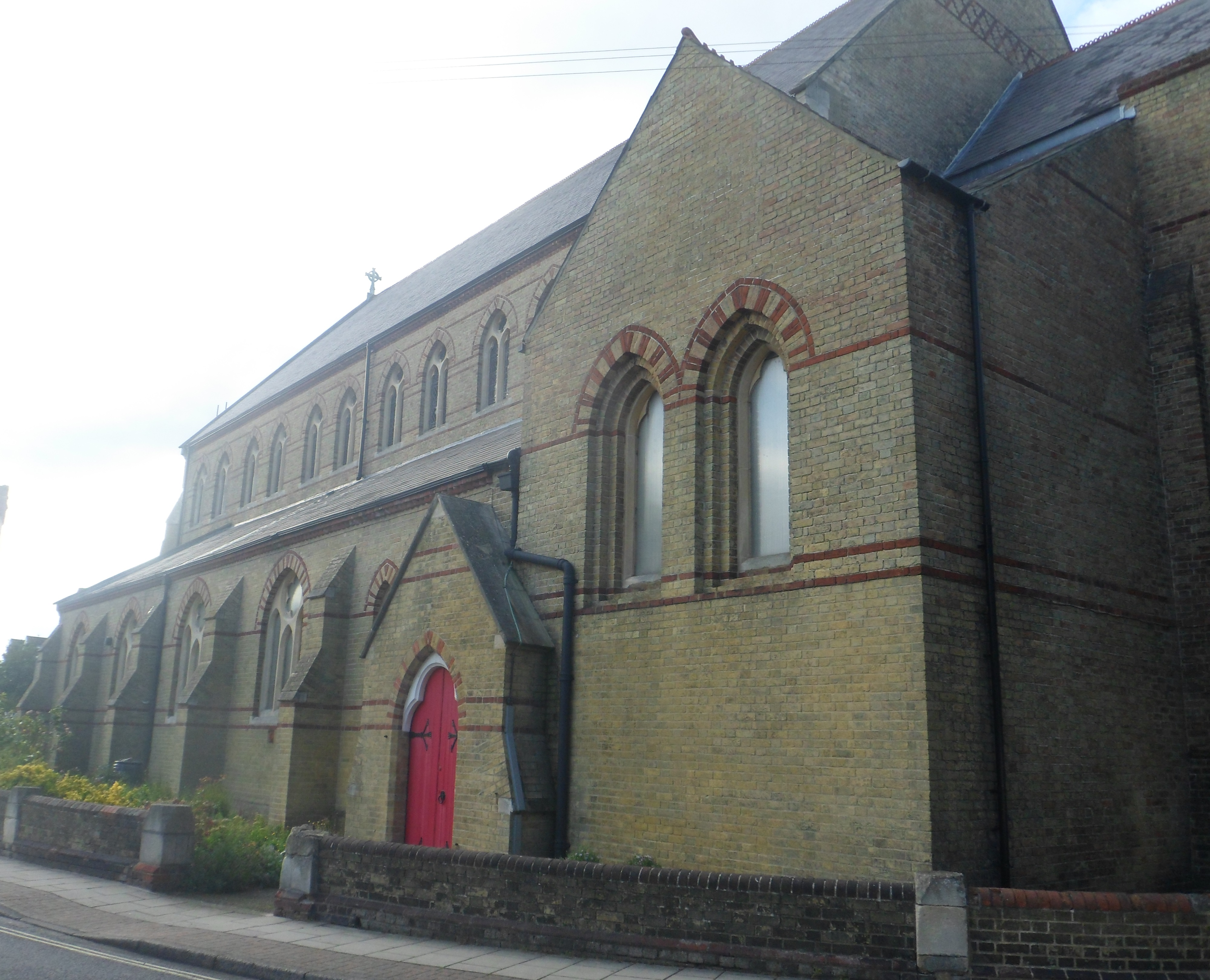
The south side of St. Simon's Church in St. Ronan's Road, Southsea which is located to the immediate north of the site of the original railway terminus building.
