= George Willis (British Army officer) =

British Army general

General Sir George Willis GCB
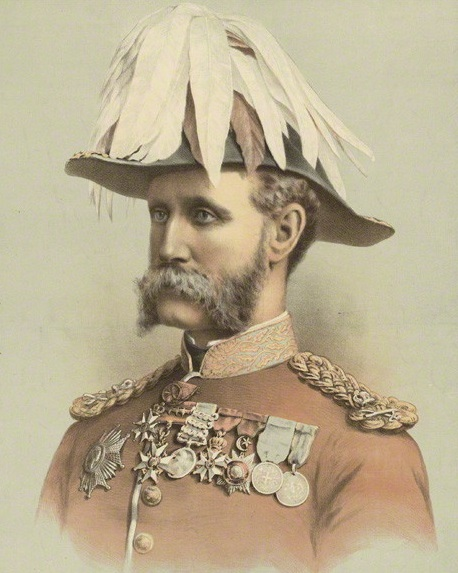
- Born: 11 November 1823; Sopley, Hampshire, England
- Died: 29 November 1900 (aged 77); Bournemouth, Hampshire, England
- Military career
- Allegiance: United Kingdom
- Branch: British Army
- Service years: 1841–1890
- Rank: General
- Commands: Northern District
- Conflicts: Crimean War; Anglo-Egyptian War
- Awards: Knight Grand Cross of the Order of the Bath

General Sir George Harry Smith Willis GCB (11 November 1823 – 29 November 1900) was a British Army General who achieved high office in the 1880s.

He was born at Sopley Park in Sopley, Hampshire.

== Military career ==
Willis was commissioned into the 77th (East Middlesex) Regiment in 1841. He served in the Crimean War and at the Battle of Inkerman he led the charge of a Grenadier company. He returned to England in 1857 to become commanding officer of 2nd Bn 6th (Warwickshire) Regiment. He was appointed assistant quartermaster-general at the War Office in 1873 and then general officer commanding Northern District in April 1878.

In 1882 he was dispatched to Egypt and commanded troops at Al-Magfar and Tell al-Mahuta during the Anglo-Egyptian War. He was involved in the capture of Mahsama and the Second battle of Kassassin.

In 1884 he was appointed GOC Southern District, retiring in 1890. Later in that year he was made colonel of the Devonshire Regiment, but transferred in 1897 as colonel to The Duke of Cambridge's Own (Middlesex Regiment), a position he held until his death.

He died in Bournemouth in 1900 and is buried at St Michael & All Angels Church in Sopley.

== Family ==
In 1856 he married Eliza Morgan, daughter of George Gould Morgan, M.P., of Brickendonbury, Hertfordshire. In 1874 he married Ada Mary Neeld, daughter of Sir John Neeld and together they went on to have four sons.

== Sources ==
- Vetch, Robert Hamilton (1901). "Willis, George Harry Smith" . In Lee, Sidney (ed.). Dictionary of National Biography (1st supplement). London: Smith, Elder & Co.

Military offices
Preceded by Sir Henry de Bathe	GOC Northern District; 1878–1881	Succeeded by William Cameron
Preceded by Prince Edward of Saxe-Weimar	GOC Southern District; 1884–1889	Succeeded by Sir Leicester Smyth
