= East Side Plaza Portsmouth =

Residential building in Portsmouth, England

No. 1 Gunwharf Quays
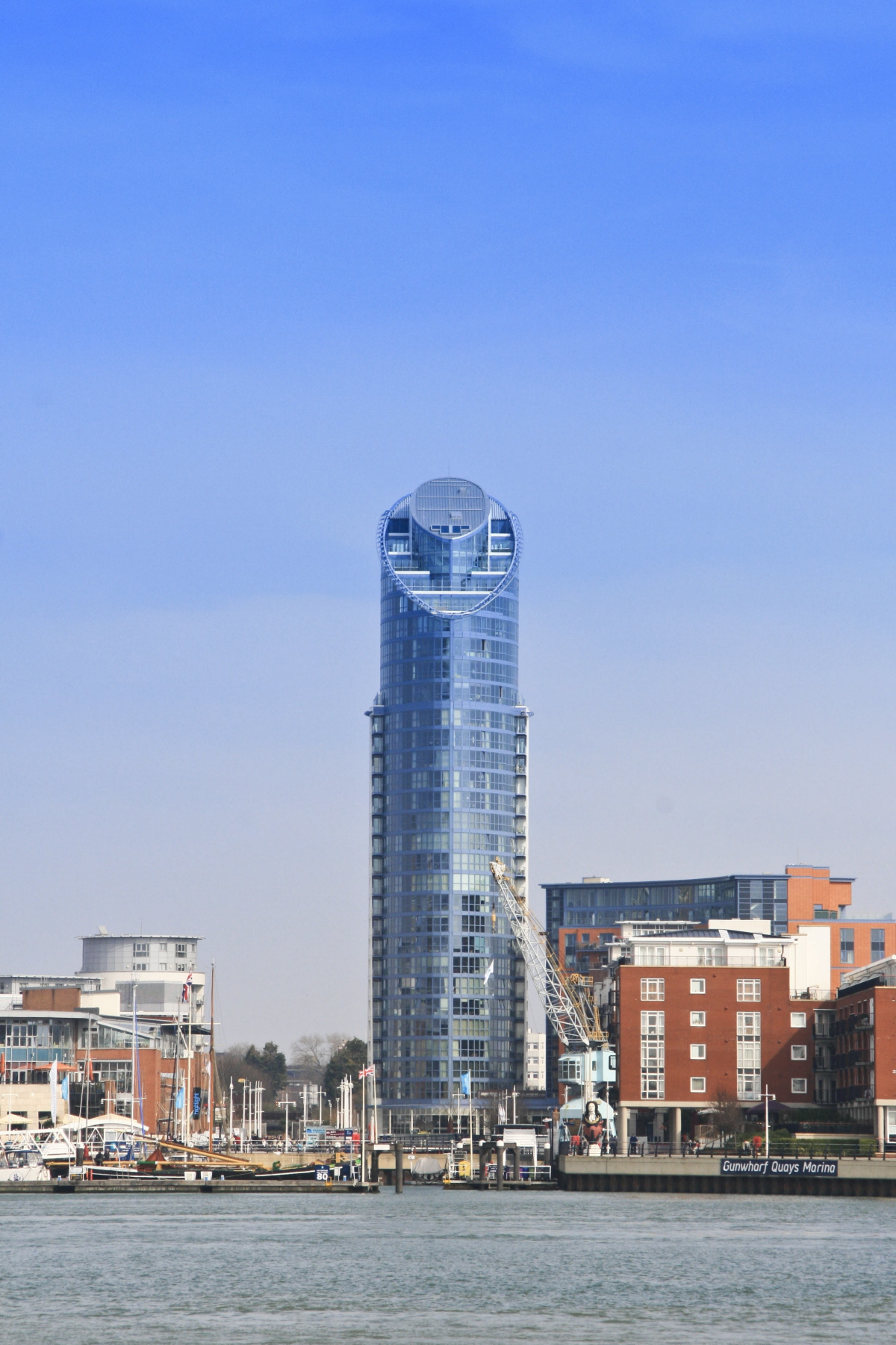
- Main façade of the building as seen from Haslar, 2011

- Location within Hampshire
- Alternative names: East Side Plaza Tower; The Lipstick; Gunwharf Tower Building

General information
- Status: Completed
- Type: Residential
- Architectural style: Postmodern
- Location: 1 Gunwharf Quays, Portsmouth, Hampshire, England
- Coordinates: 50.795418°N 1.103418°W
- Construction started: 2005
- Completed: 2008
- Cost: £50 million

Height
- Height: 98 m (322 ft)

Technical details
- Floor count: 29

Design and construction
- Architect: Broadway Malyan
- Structural engineer: Gifford Ltd
- Main contractor: Byrne Brothers

1 Gunwharf Quays, also known as East Side Plaza Tower or the Gunwharf Tower Building, is a 98 m (322 ft) tall residential building with 29 floors, located at the Gunwharf Quays shopping complex in Portsmouth, Hampshire, England. It is commonly referred to as The Lipstick because of its shape, and was completed in 2008. It has a Brasserie Blanc restaurant at its base. As of 2025 it is the second-tallest structure in Portsmouth, after the 170-metre (560 ft) tall Spinnaker Tower.

The tower was the flagship of a three-part project that consisted of The Blue Building, The Crescent and The East Size Plaza tower (No1. Gunwharf Quays). The £50 million project was completed in 2010.

The building also won Best Urban Regeneration Housing Scheme in 2004.

== See also ==
- List of tallest buildings and structures in Portsmouth
