= Gunwharf Quays =

Shopping centre in Portsmouth, England

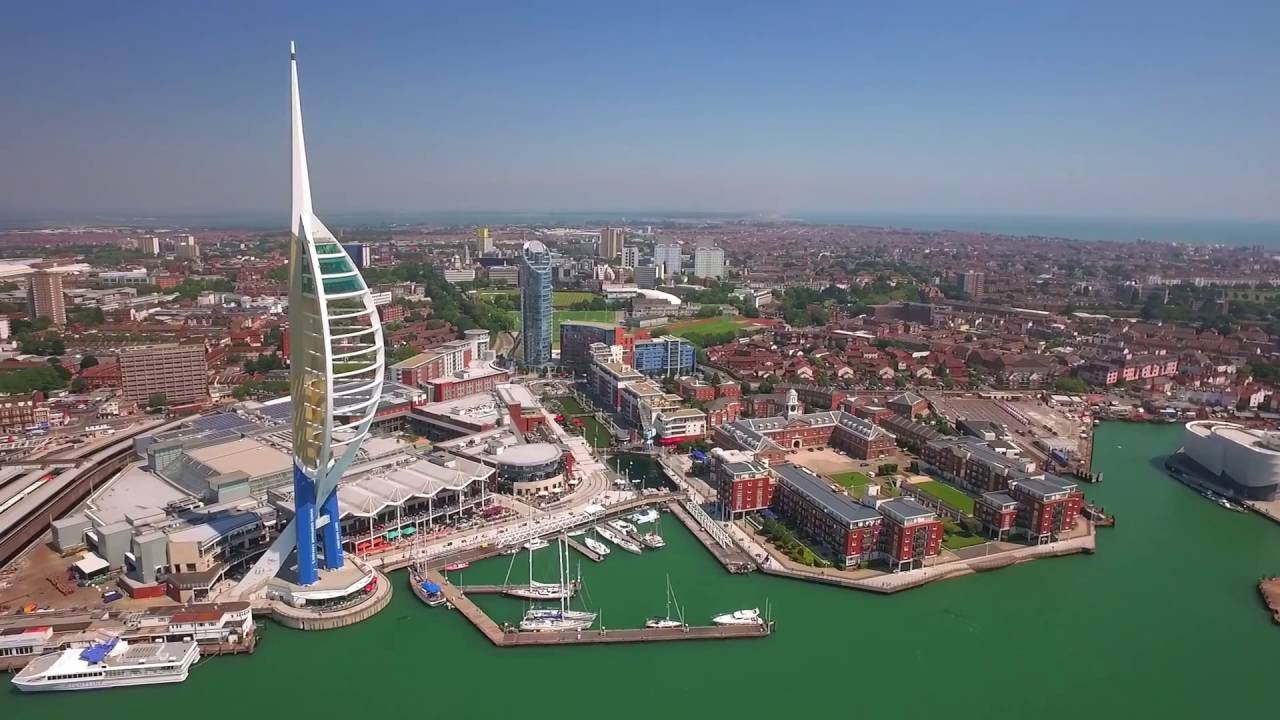
- Aerial view of Gunwharf Quays, June 2020
- Location: Portsmouth, Hampshire, England
- Coordinates: 50.7949°N 1.1058°W
- Owner: Land Securities
- Num. of stores: 93 plus a cinema, 25 pubs and restaurants
- Floors: 2
- Website: gunwharf-quays.com

Gunwharf Quays is a designer outlet centre located in the Portsea area of the city of Portsmouth in England. Opened in the early 21st century, it was constructed on the site of what had once been HM Gunwharf, Portsmouth. The Gun Wharf, dating from the early 18th century, was a storage facility (one of several established by the Board of Ordnance close to the Royal Dockyards) where cannons, ammunition and other armaments were kept, repaired and made ready for use on land or at sea. It later served as HMS Vernon, the Royal Navy's torpedo and anti-submarine school (latterly its mine warfare and diving training establishment).

The military site closed in 1995. After six years of reconstruction (which included the restoration of some of the surviving 18th and 19th-century Gun Wharf buildings), the area was opened to the public as Gunwharf Quays on 28 February 2001. The site contains the landmark Spinnaker Tower, built on pilings on the edge of Portsmouth Harbour, which was opened on 18 October 2005.

== History ==
With the establishment of Portsmouth Royal Dockyard in the 15th century, the Ordnance Office (responsible for equipping the Army and Navy alike with cannons and munitions) had to create the means of conveying weapons to and from warships in harbour, and maintaining them when not in use (a ship when not on active service would have its guns removed and placed in storage, until they were next required.)

At first, Portchester Castle was used and in 1521 a sizeable storehouse was built there within the outer bailey. From the 1580s the Town Quay in Old Portsmouth was used; this was not far from the Square Tower, newly-converted at that time to serve as a gunpowder store. Later, in 1676, a wharf and storehouses on Portsmouth Point were leased to the Ordnance Office to serve as an ordnance yard. By the late 17th century, however, as Portsmouth Dockyard was further expanded, there were calls for construction of a new, purpose-built gun wharf to meet Portsmouth's increasingly-complex requirements.

=== Old Gun Wharf ===
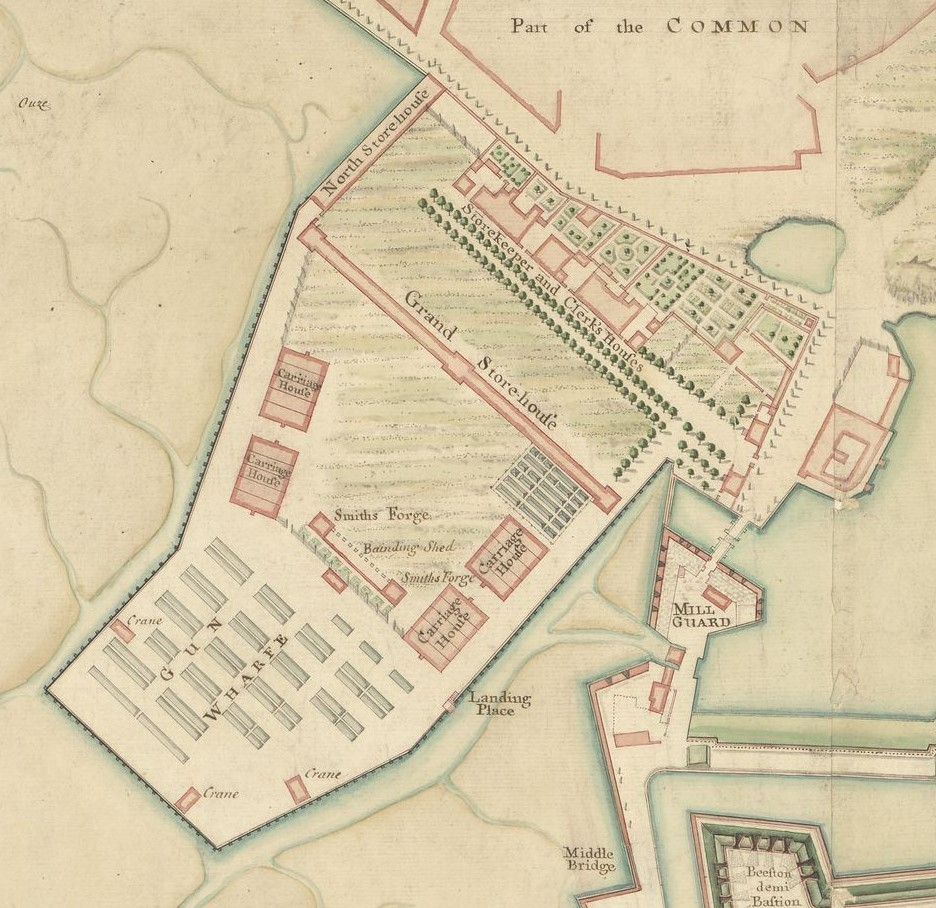
The 'Gun Wharfe' (Old Gun Wharf) in 1750, from a map drawn by J. P. Desmaretz. The site includes officers' housing (top right), two large storehouses, carriage houses (for gun carriages), forges for repairs and the wharf itself (bottom left) where the cannons and shot were stacked.

Between 1706 and 1714 a Gun Wharf was constructed on land newly-reclaimed from the sea. It was built to the north of the Mill Pond, which powered a tide mill (known as the King's Mill), which produced flour for the Royal Navy. Later known as the Old Gun Wharf, it jutted into the harbour and was protected by a tall wall at its landward end; the entrance was at the eastern corner, close to the mill and its protective redoubt. Inside the gate was a row of houses for the Storekeeper (the senior Ordnance officer on the site) and his clerks, fronted by a green space lined with trees.

The Gun Wharf was dominated by a very long (490 ft (150 m)) Grand Storehouse, the longest such building in any ordnance yard. Completed in 1710, it was used for all kinds of ordnance stores including oil, tallow, cartridges and powder horns. In front of the storehouse, carriage stores were built on either side and a pair of forges for basic repairs. Gunpowder was not stored on the site (it was kept in the Square Tower until the 1770s, and subsequently in a purpose-built facility across the harbour at Priddy's Hard).

New buildings continued to be added to the gunwharf during the 18th century, as the Navy and the Dockyard grew in size and prestige. A large, pedimented Artillery Store was built, directly in front of the Grand Storehouse, in the 1780s; and in 1797 an Armoury was erected alongside the officers' houses, to store pistols, muskets, cutlasses, boarding pikes and numerous other items. (Most of the buildings of the Old Gun Wharf were demolished after the First World War, when the site was reconfigured for HMS Vernon, but the Artillery Store was converted into an accommodation block (known as the 'Warrior' building); it was later damaged in the Blitz, heavily reconstructed in the 1950s and eventually demolished in 1998. The 18th-century carriage houses also survived, albeit very much altered, until they too were demolished in 1998.)

=== New Gun Wharf ===
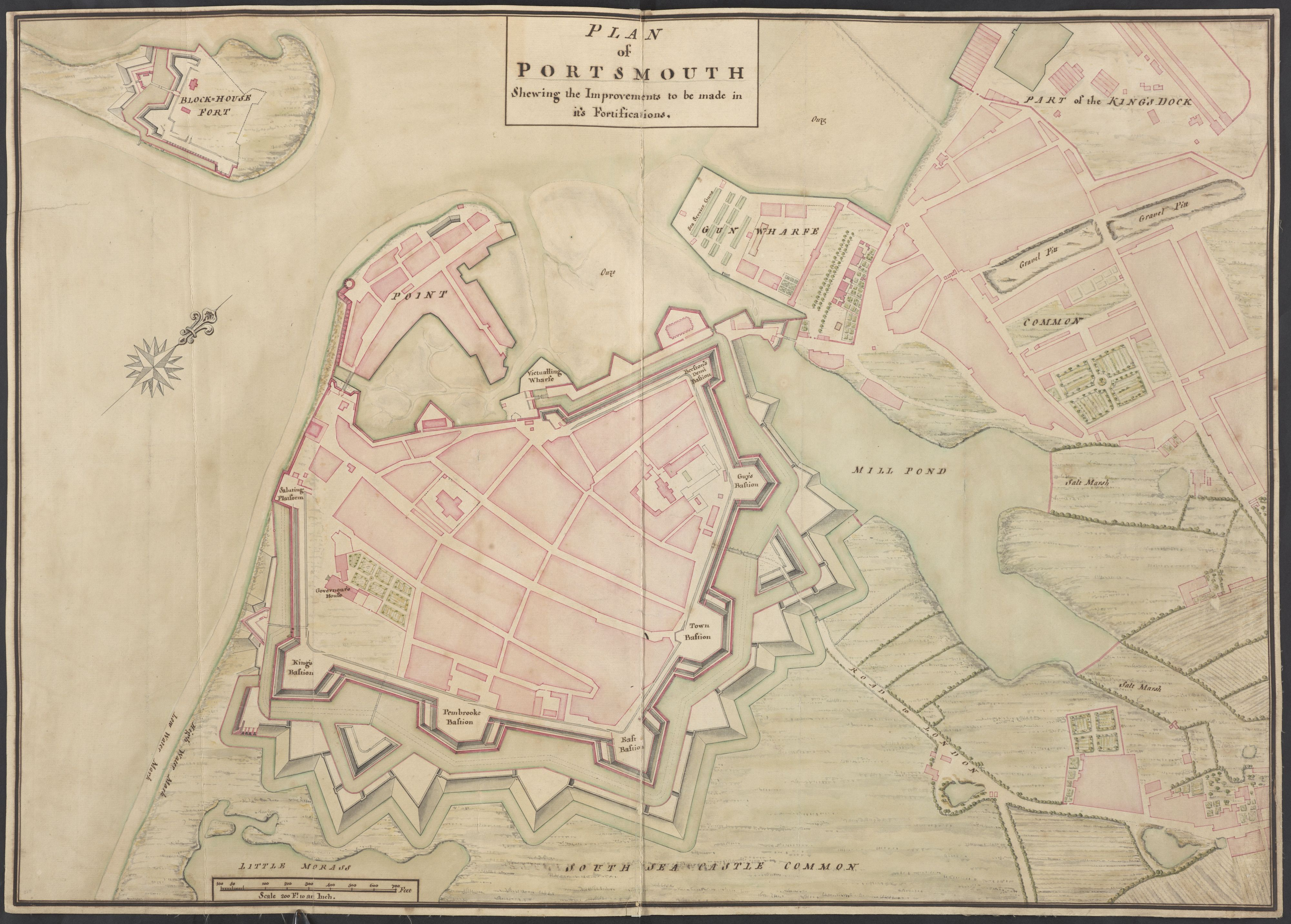
Mid-18th-century plan of Portsmouth, showing the Old Gun Wharf (upper centre-right) and the Point (upper centre-left). Between the two is the 'ouze' (mudbank) on which the New Gun Wharf would be built (and below it is the 'Victualling Wharf').

Beginning in 1797, the ordnance yard was significantly extended by reclaiming further land from the sea to the south of the old Mill Pond, an area which became known as the New Gun Wharf (to differentiate it from the Old Gun Wharf to the north, which continued in service). To ensure continued operation of the King's Mill a creek was maintained between the two halves of the site, which were linked to each other via a swing bridge. The creek had wharves on either side and the upper end of the creek was formed into a basin, to facilitate the loading and unloading of stores from hoys and lighters. Facing the New Gun Wharf across the creek was a new office building (which remains in place as the 'Old Custom House' pub).

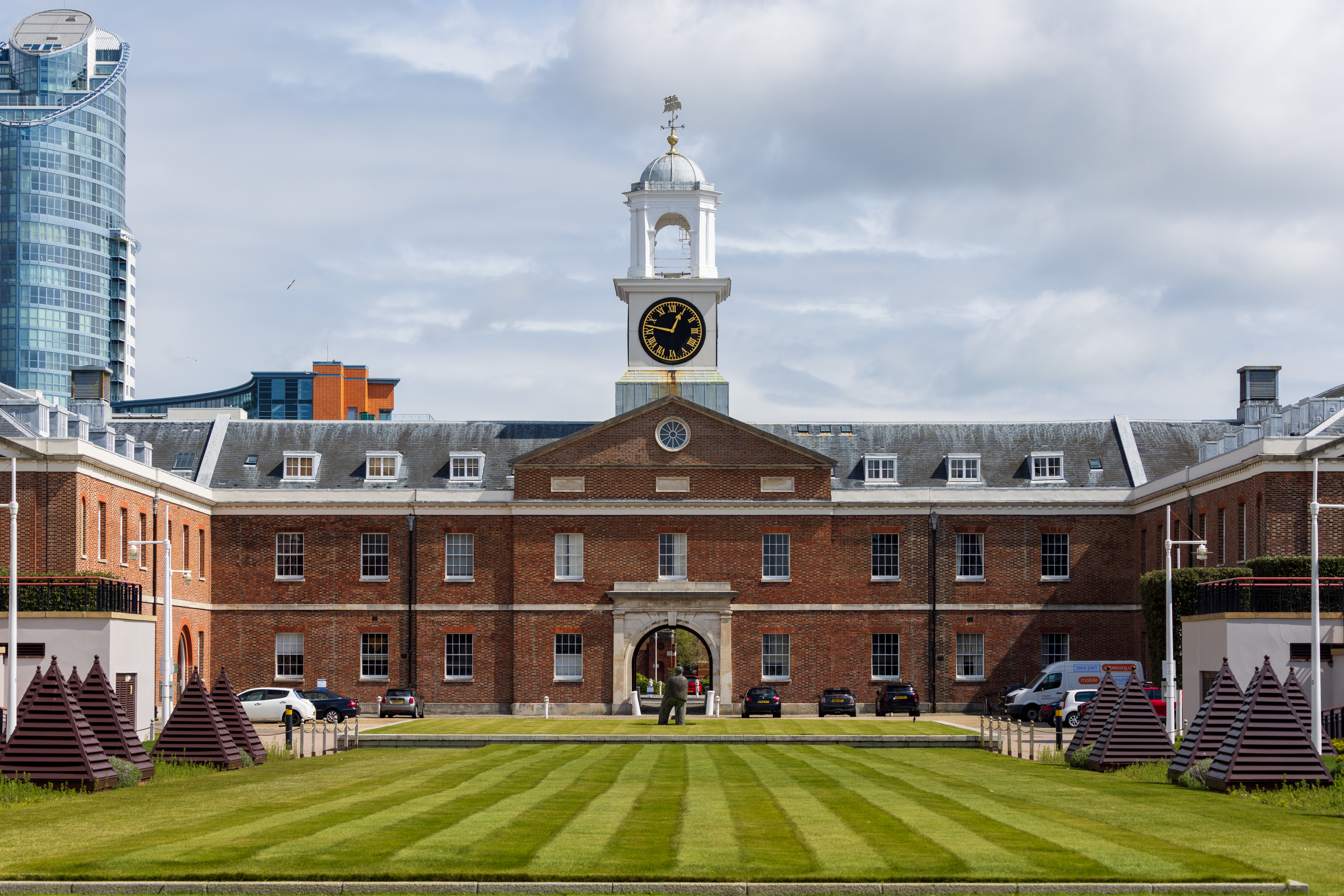
Central section of the Grand Storehouse of 1814, now known as the Vulcan Building

By 1808 a long storehouse had been built along the southern edge of the New Gun Wharf; but no sooner had it been completed than it (along with the adjoining wharf) was requisitioned by the Victualling Commissioners to expand their adjacent Victualling Yard. This was achieved by 1810 when the southern edge of the New Gun Wharf was walled off from the rest, so as to operate independently. Following this development, work began in 1811 on a new storehouse: a 'Grand Storehouse', which would form the centrepiece of the New Gun Wharf. Completed in 1814, it was (until 1900) the largest ordnance storehouse on any of the nation's gunwharves. It was later designated as a 'Land Service Store', while its counterpart on the Old Gun Wharf served as a 'Sea Service Store'; both held stocks of all kinds of ordnance items which the Board of Ordnance was responsible for supplying to the British Army and Navy. (Renamed 'Vulcan' in the 1920s, the erstwhile Grand Storehouse was damaged in the Blitz and partly demolished after the war, but restored in the late 1990s).

A wide range of ordnance-related equipment had to be accommodated within the Yard. Gun carriages in particular took up a lot of space, and were prone to decay if left outside. Cannons and cannonballs, on the other hand, could be stored in the open air without too much damage being done, as described here in 1817:

Every ship in ordinary has on the wharf her guns, placed in regular rows, each ship's guns by themselves, with the name of the ship they belong to, painted in capital letters on the first gun of each parcel. The balls are formed in pyramids from 42 pounders to the lowest bores, every size in a pyramid by themselves; the bomb shells are also placed in the same regular order.

=== Gunwharf barracks ===
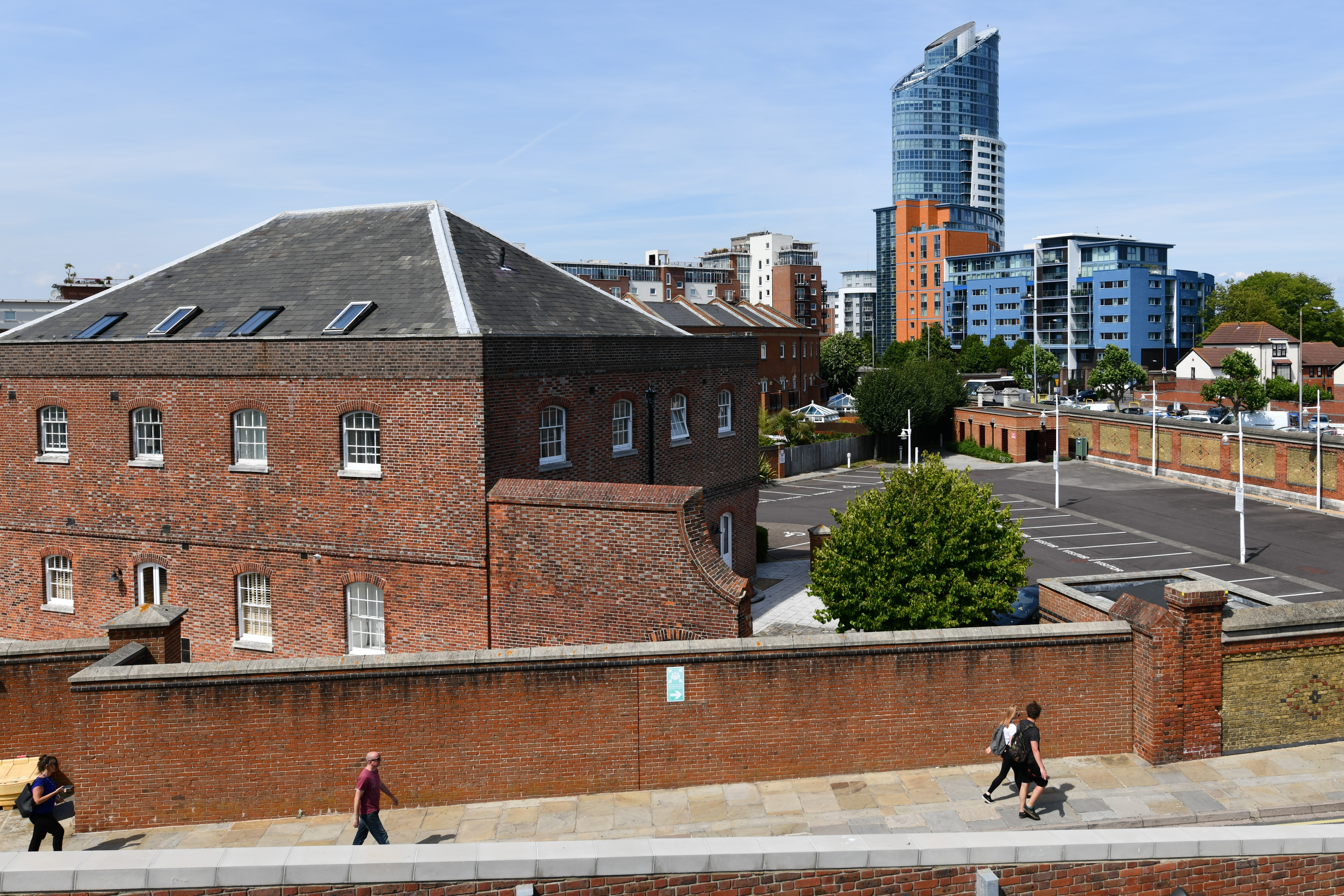
The former Royal Marine Infirmary (a surviving part of the old Gunwharf Barracks).

In 1824 the Victualling Commissioners (who were moving their operations across to what would become the Royal Clarence Victualling Yard on the other side of the harbour) vacated their set of storehouses on the southern edge of the Gun Wharf. These were then converted to form barracks for the Royal Marine Artillery (the first time that this section of the Corps had been provided with its own separate barracks). In 1858 the Royal Marine Artillery moved out (first to Fort Cumberland, then to the new purpose-built Eastney Barracks); Gunwharf Barracks were then given over to the Royal Artillery for a time, after which they were occupied by the Army Ordnance Corps until 1891.

=== Victorian expansion ===
As the century progressed, more buildings were added to the area: a plan dated 1859 indicates more than a dozen other large storehouses all around the site. In 1868 the King's Mill burned down and was not rebuilt. Soon afterwards, the Mill Pond was filled in and at around the same time the old fortifications of Portsmouth (which hemmed in the landward end of the Gun Wharf) were demolished, allowing the site to expand eastwards on to new ground. In the 1870s a railway line to Portsmouth Harbour was built across the north-west corner of the Old Gun Wharf; as compensation for the loss of land the railway company provided new housing for officers in the area of the new extension.

The Board of Ordnance had been disestablished in 1855 and its responsibilities transferred to the War Department. In 1891 the responsibility for Naval ordnance provision was separated from that for the Army (prior to this date the same organisation had been responsible for both): the new Naval Ordnance Stores Department took over responsibility for the New Gun Wharf, while the Army Ordnance Department retained the Old Gun Wharf.

As ships and armaments developed, the requirement to offload guns and ammunition diminished and the Gunwharves focused increasingly on manufacturing ammunition. By the end of the 19th century, what had been the blacksmith's forge in the New Gun Wharf had expanded and developed into a fully-fledged Royal Ordnance Factory.

=== HMS Vernon ===
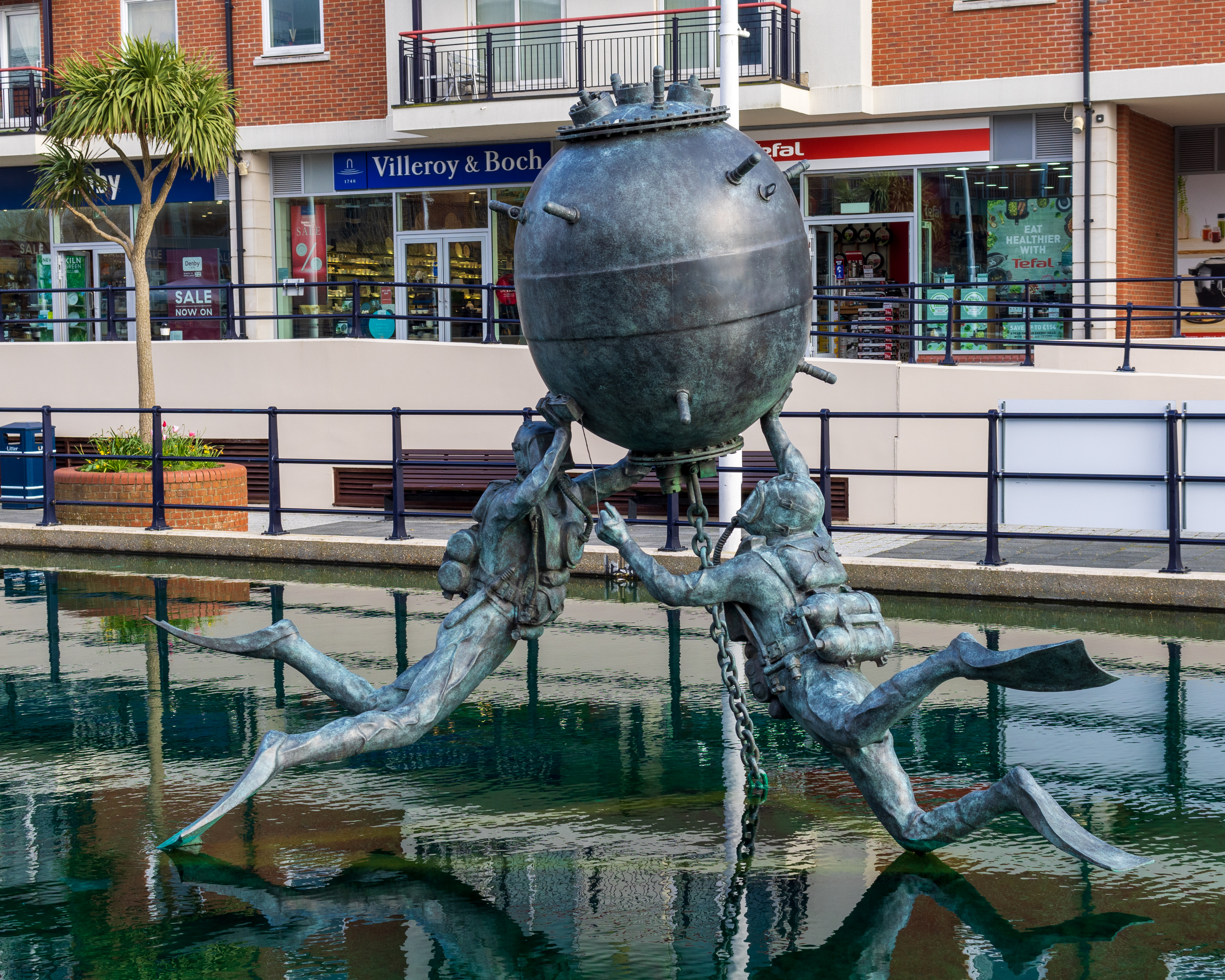
The Vernon Mine Warfare and Diving Monument at Gunwharf Quays (unveiled in 2020).

In 1916 the Mining School, a constituent part of the Navy's torpedo establishment known as HMS Vernon, was moved ashore into what would soon become known as the Vulcan building in the Naval Gunwharf (the southern part of the site). Subsequently a number of other buildings were erected nearby, or taken over, for mine-related instruction and experimental research. One of the most prominent additions, built just behind the Vulcan building in 1917, was the 94 ft (29 m)-high Mining Tank, containing a 55 ft (17 m) column of water which was used for testing mine designs.

At the time, the rest of HMS Vernon was still accommodated in hulks, moored in Portchester Creek. At the end of the First World War, the decision was taken to move the entire establishment ashore, and so plans were made to remove the remaining gunwharf activities to other locations in the Portsmouth area. The army would still retain a narrow strip of land along the north-western edge of the Old Gun Wharf, to serve as a military wharf and jetty, but most of their troops and stores were moved to Hilsea; while the naval gunwharf was relocated to a parcel of land immediately to the north of RNAD Priddy's Hard. As part of the reconfiguration of the gunwharf site around twenty buildings were demolished and the basin at the end of the creek was filled in. New accommodation blocks and sporting facilities were built to the north and east, and workshops and teaching rooms were added on what had been open areas to the west and south. Buildings across the site were named after the various ships that had served as hulks and tenders when the school had been afloat.

After these rebuilding works had been completed, Vernon in its entirety moved ashore: the Electrical Department joined the Mining Department in the New Gun Wharf, while the Whitehead (or Torpedo) Department took over the Old Gun Wharf. The separate Mine Design Department (which had been established in 1919 as part of the Admiralty Experimental Station) also moved in and occupied the old Ordnance Factory premises, to the east of the Vulcan building. The site then reopened as the Vernon shore establishment (HMS Vernon) in 1923. A small flotilla of destroyers, tenders and trawlers was also based there.

In 1935 a fire in the Electrical Experimental Department (based in the old Gunwharf Barracks) destroyed a substantial part of that building (the rest was later destroyed in the blitz). During the Second World War Vernon undertook crucial work in mine countermeasures and anti-submarine warfare; but it was also a target for aerial bombardment. During the Portsmouth Blitz it received several direct hits, which prompted several key departments to move to more remote locations for the rest of the duration of the war. Several buildings were damaged and destroyed, including the Dido block where a hundred people lost their lives in a single night. Some units remained on the gunwharf site through the war, including the Command Fire-fighting School and a mine disposal unit. A WRNS unit was also based there, they worked in the bomb-damaged Mine Design Department workshops assembling components for detonators.

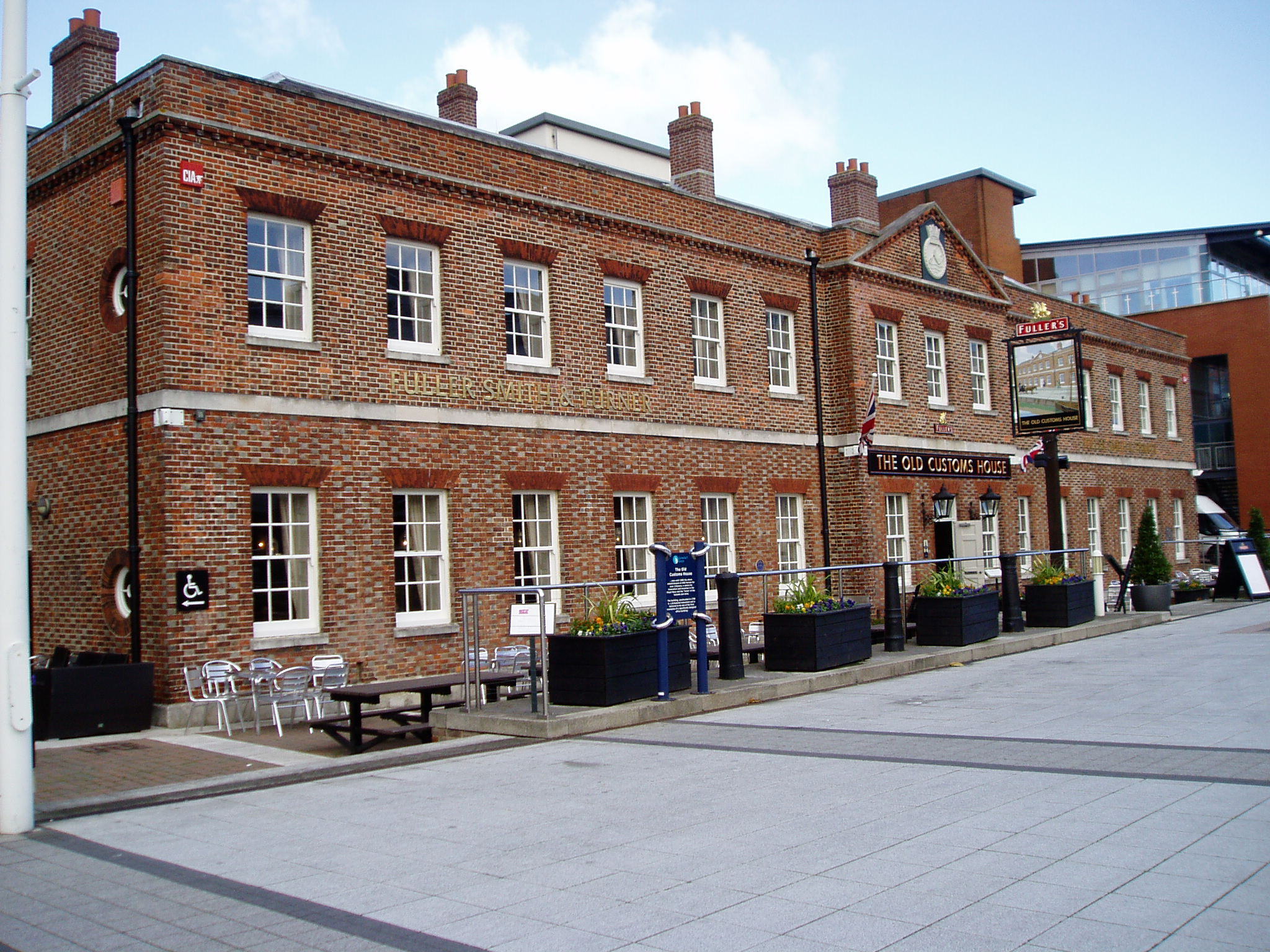
The former Vernon administrative block on the Old Gun Wharf side of the canal.

Before the end of the war, plans had been drawn up for the near complete demolition of pre-20th century buildings on the gunwharf site (with only the administrative block scheduled to remain) and their replacement with a modern complex. In preparation for this, in 1947 the northern wing of the Vulcan building was pulled down (along with several other structures); but the building work was paused before the rest of the building was demolished. The scheme in the end was only partially implemented (after some delay) with construction of the Creasy instructional block (begun in the 1950s). On the Old Gun Wharf side, the Warrior Block (accommodation for junior ratings), originally built as a large Artillery Store in the 18th century, was comprehensively rebuilt with only the exterior walls retained.

After the war, HMS Vernon was occupied by the newly-merged Torpedo and Anti-Submarine branch (TAS). As part of TAS, mine warfare training continued to take place at Vernon, which also took on responsibility for naval diving (under the Superintendent of Diving, who had previously been based at HMS Excellent). The 1st (later 2nd) Mine Countermeasures Squadron was based at Vernon, as was the RN Diving School and the Admiralty Experimental Diving Unit (which took over the old Mining Tank in 1959 and converted it into a diving facility). Further new buildings were added in the 1960s, including the four-storey Scott accommodation block (for Petty Officers and junior ratings), opened in 1968. In 1975 parts of the site became a Scheduled Ancient Monument.

As part of a wider reconfiguration, the Torpedo and Anti-Submarine branch moved in 1974 to HMS Dryad; but Minewarfare and Diving Training (MDT) remained at HMS Vernon. In 1982, following a Defence Review the previous year, the government announced its intention to close HMS Vernon in four years' time. Vernon duly ceased to be a separate command in 1986 and it became an offshoot of HMS Nelson (being designated, at first, HMS Nelson (Vernon Site) and then, from 1987, HMS Nelson (Gunwharf)). Nevertheless, for a further decade the base remained open; MDT continued to be based there and some other units moved in for a time (albeit temporarily). Last to leave were the Minewarfare section, which moved to HMS Dryad in March 1995, and the RN Diving School, which in September that year moved to Horsea Island (long used for underwater training) where it combined with the Royal Engineers Diving Establishment to form a new Defence Diving School. The final closure took place on 1 April 1996.

=== H.M. Gunwharf ===
Since 1918, the Royal Army Service Corps had continued to operate the military wharf on the north-western edge of the site as H.M. Gunwharf, Portsmouth. It served as a base for the War Department Fleet through World War II, and under the Royal Corps of Transport (from 1965) it became the primary WD Fleet base. The last military unit, 20 Maritime Regiment RCT, moved out of H.M. Gunwharf in February 1988 and subsequently the wharf was transferred to the Navy in preparation for the sale of the site.

== Refurbishment ==
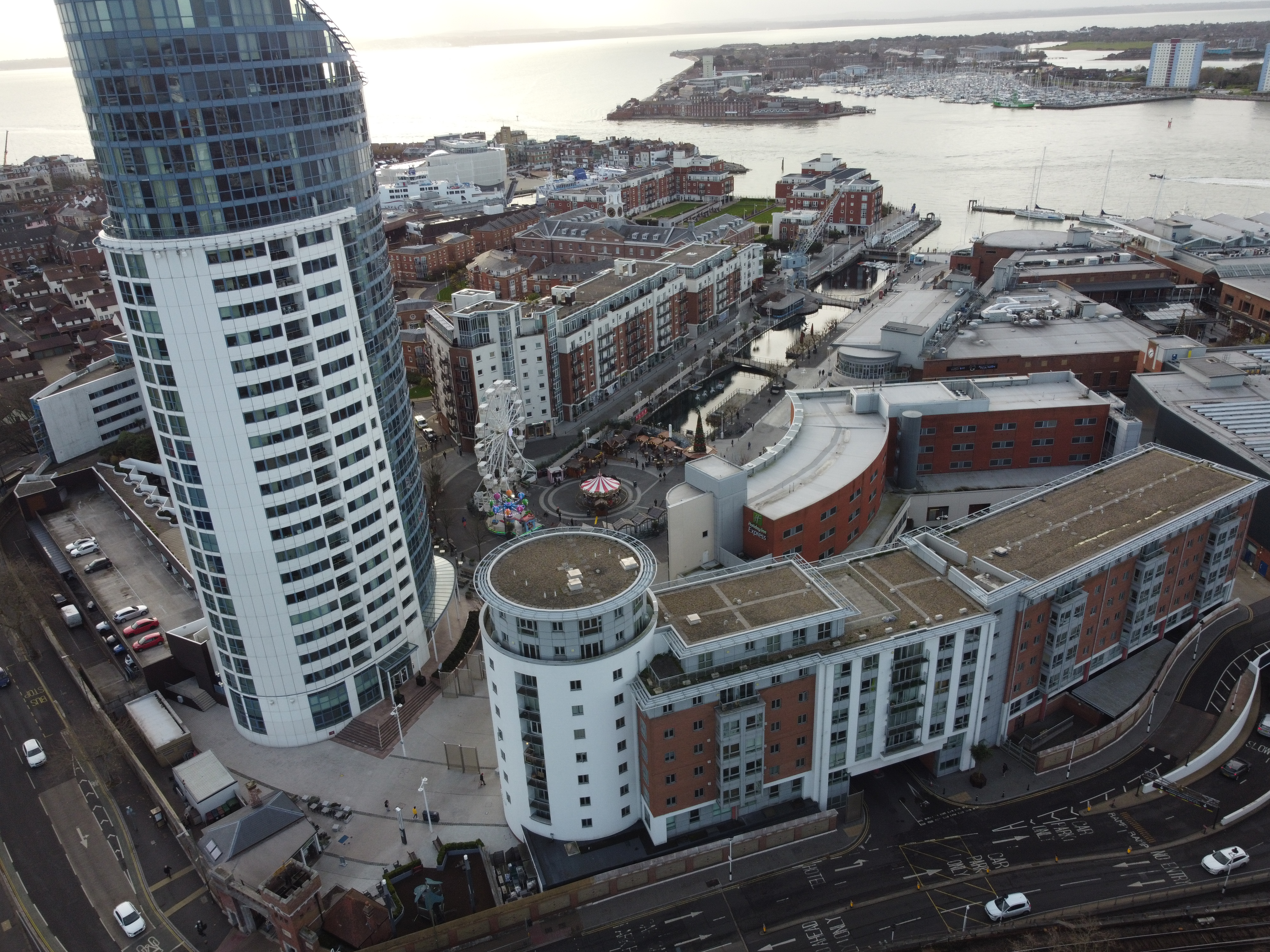
Aerial view from the north-east

Naval and military use of the site ceased in 1995. In April of that year, a consortium including Portsmouth City Council had submitted a bid to the Millennium Commission entitled 'Renaissance of Portsmouth Harbour'. Redevelopment of the Gunwharf site was a key element of the bid, which also included the idea of a 'Millennium tower'; in September a £40 million grant was awarded and the project (which aimed to improve Portsmouth Harbour as a tourist destination and prioritise public access to historic sites) was granted 'Landmark status'. A master plan had been drawn up for mixed-use development of the Gunwharf site and a bespoke company (Portsmouth Harbour Renaissance Ltd) oversaw the design and development process. In January 1996 tenders were invited for the development of the site and in October the Ministry of Defence announced that Berkeley Group Holdings had been successful.

After being redeveloped to a design by HGP Architects, Gunwharf Quays opened to the public on 28 February 2001. Originally, plans for the site had included retention of some of the 1920s buildings (added for HMS Vernon), including 'Ariadne' block (the former officers' mess) and Donegal Lodge (latterly the commanding officer's house); but in 2001 they were demolished. After some debate, a 29-storey largely residential tower (No.1 Gunwharf Quay) was built on the site of the 'Ariadne' block between 2008 and 2009.

=== Retained historic buildings and structures ===
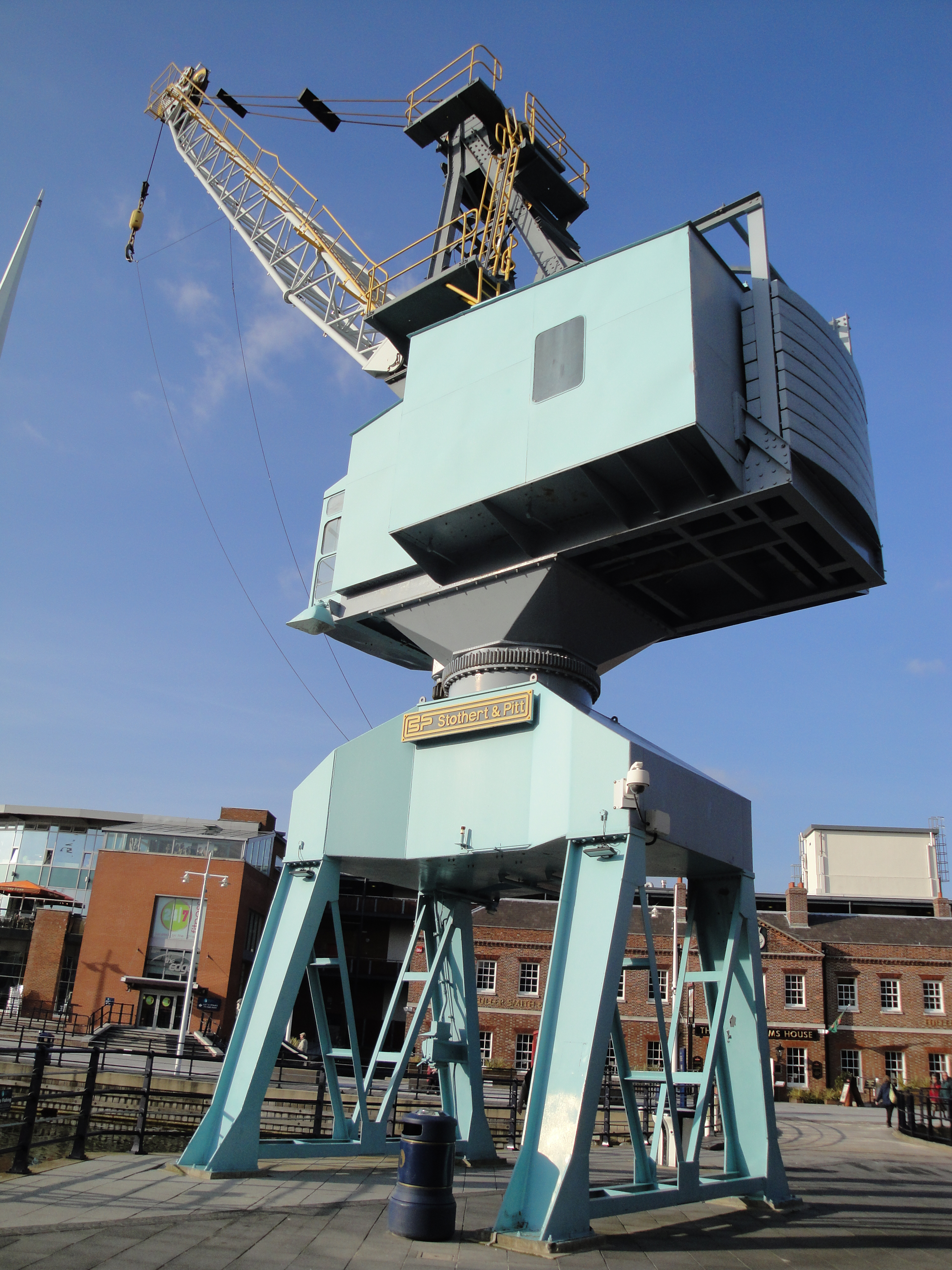
Preserved quayside crane (manufactured by Stothert & Pitt).

HMS Vernon suffered extensive damage during the Blitz, but a number of historic structures survived, some of which have been restored as part of the Gunwharf Quays development.

- The Old Customs House pub and restaurant, built as an administration block in the late 18th century, is the oldest building on the site and the only significant survival on the Old Gun Wharf side.
- An early 19th-century gateway stands behind the Vulcan building, indicating the line of the original boundary of the New Gun Wharf; Initially hemmed in by the fortifications of Old Portsmouth, the site expanded further when the town fortifications were levelled in the 1870s; much of the later perimeter wall, which dates from this expansion, remains in place around the edge of the site, along with the Main Gate of c.1870.
- The Grand Storehouse (later called the Vulcan Building) was the principal structure on the New Gun Wharf, built 1811–14. Its north wing and clock tower were both destroyed in the Blitz and only reinstated as part of the Gunwharf Quays reconstruction.
- The old Royal Marines Infirmary building was originally built as an Ordnance Storehouse at around the same time as the Vulcan block; together with other nearby storehouses it was converted to form Gunwharf Barracks, of which it is the only surviving part.
- Behind the Vulcan building, and dwarfed by it, is a former shell store (Building No. 25) dating from 1856.

== Gallery ==
=== Old Gunwharf (1706) and preserved figureheads ===
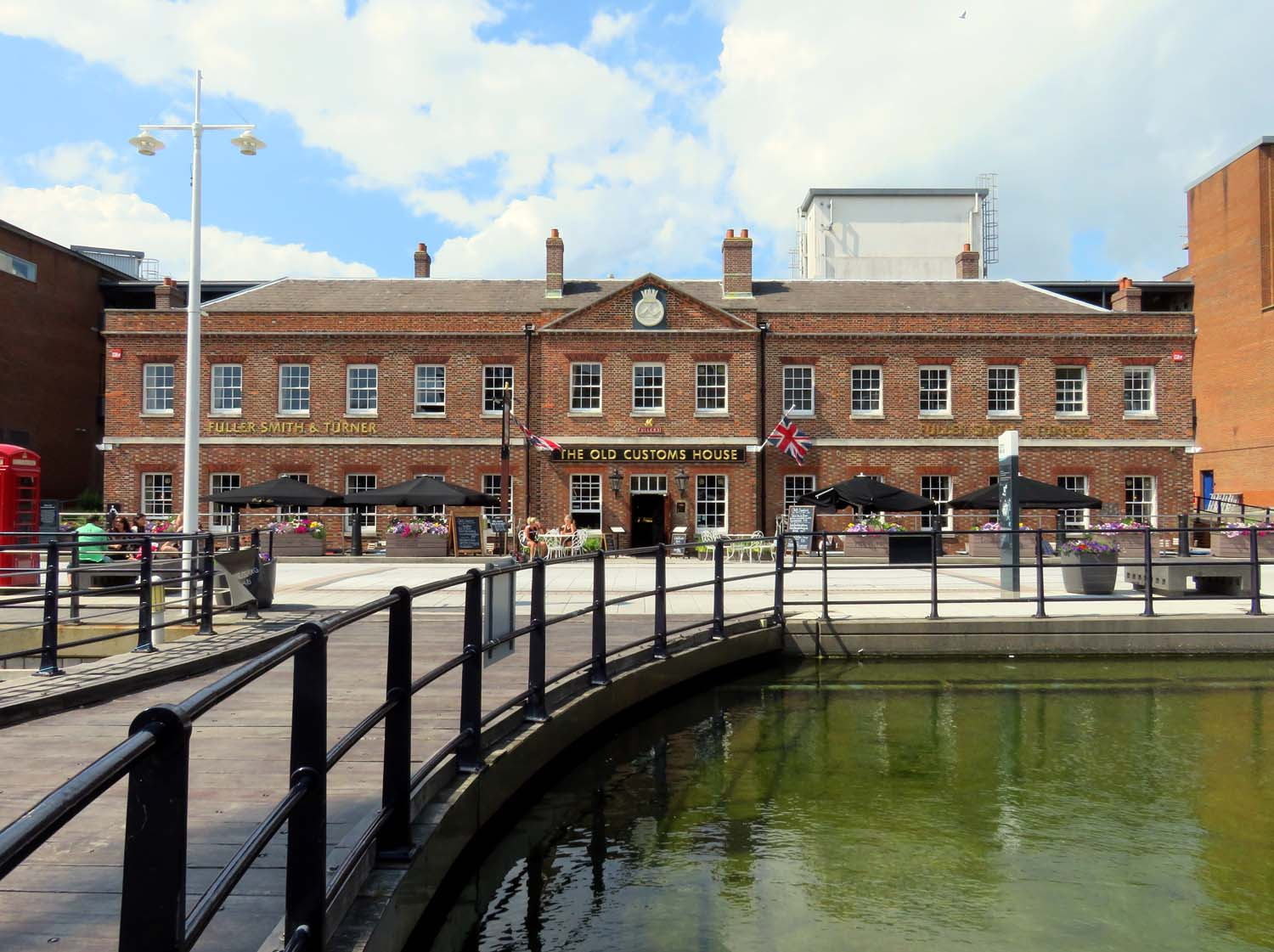
This building (c.1811) served as the main administrative block.

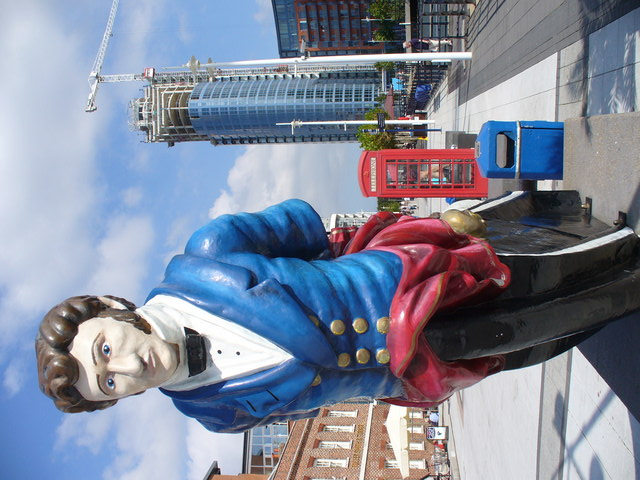
Figurehead from the original (1832) ship HMS Vernon

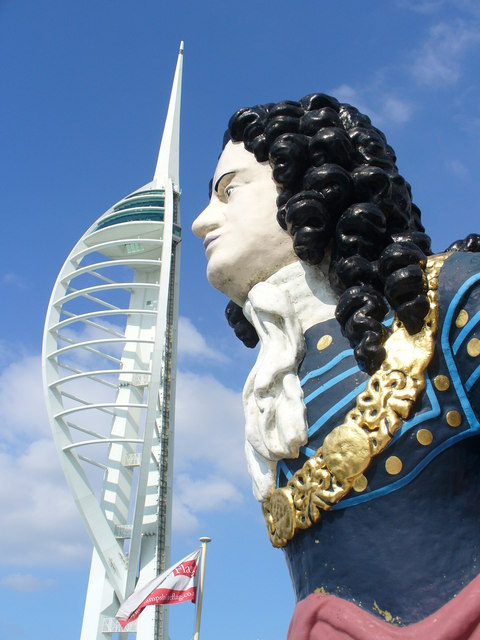
Figurehead from HMS Marlborough, which latterly served as an accommodation hulk for HMS Vernon

=== New Gunwharf (1800) ===
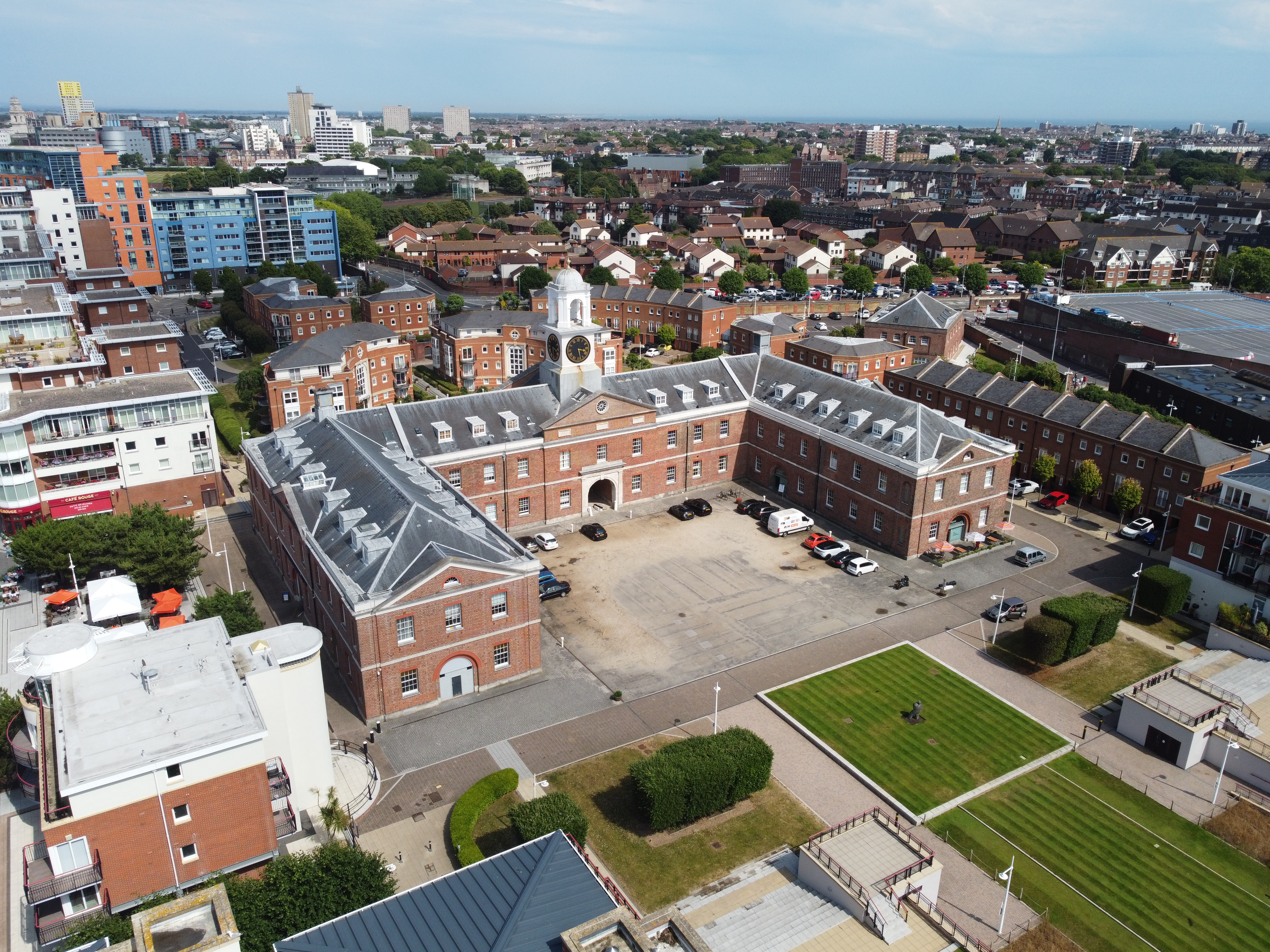
Aerial view of the Vulcan Block (1814)

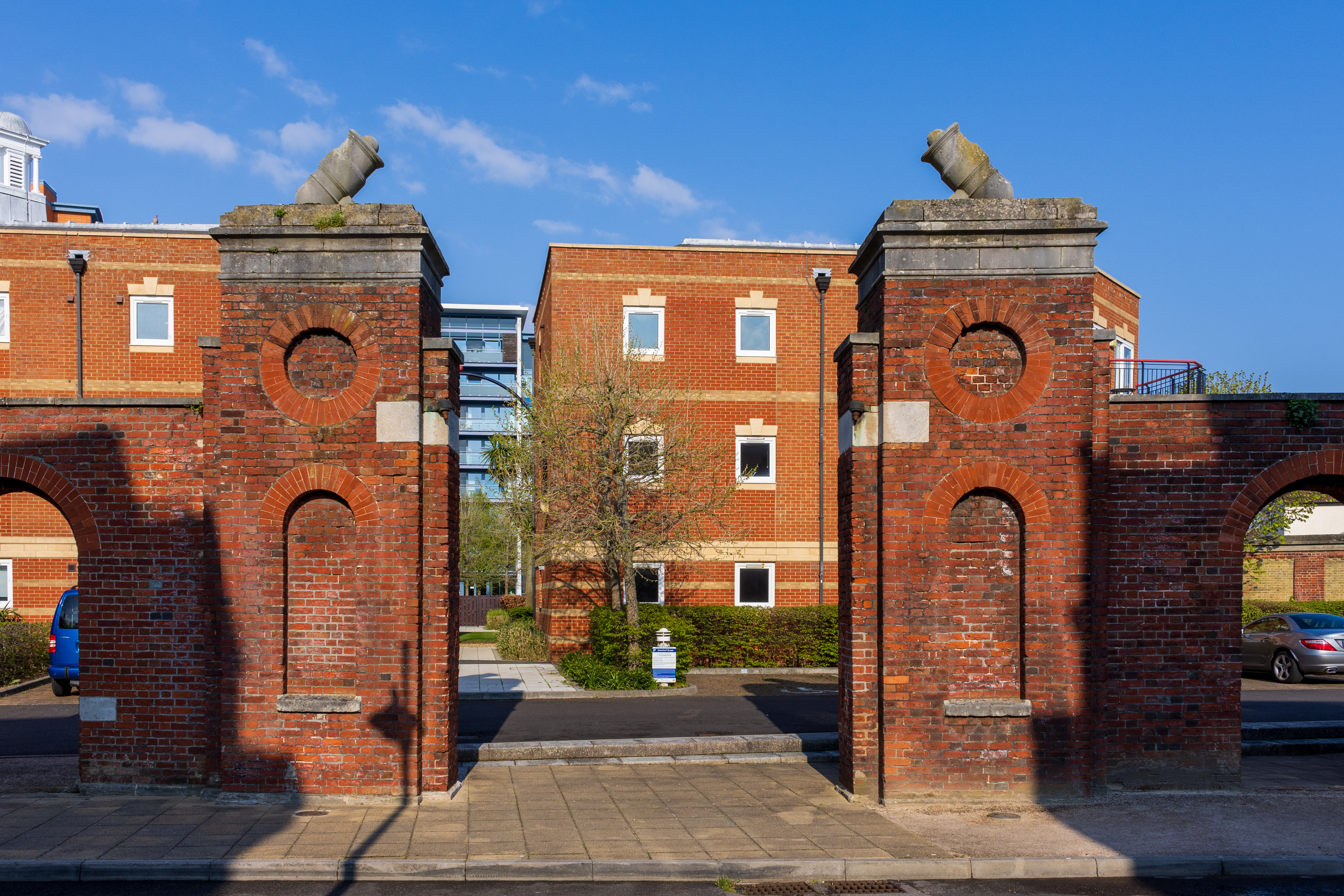
Behind the Vulcan Building, this gateway and wall (c.1802) marks the original perimeter of the site.

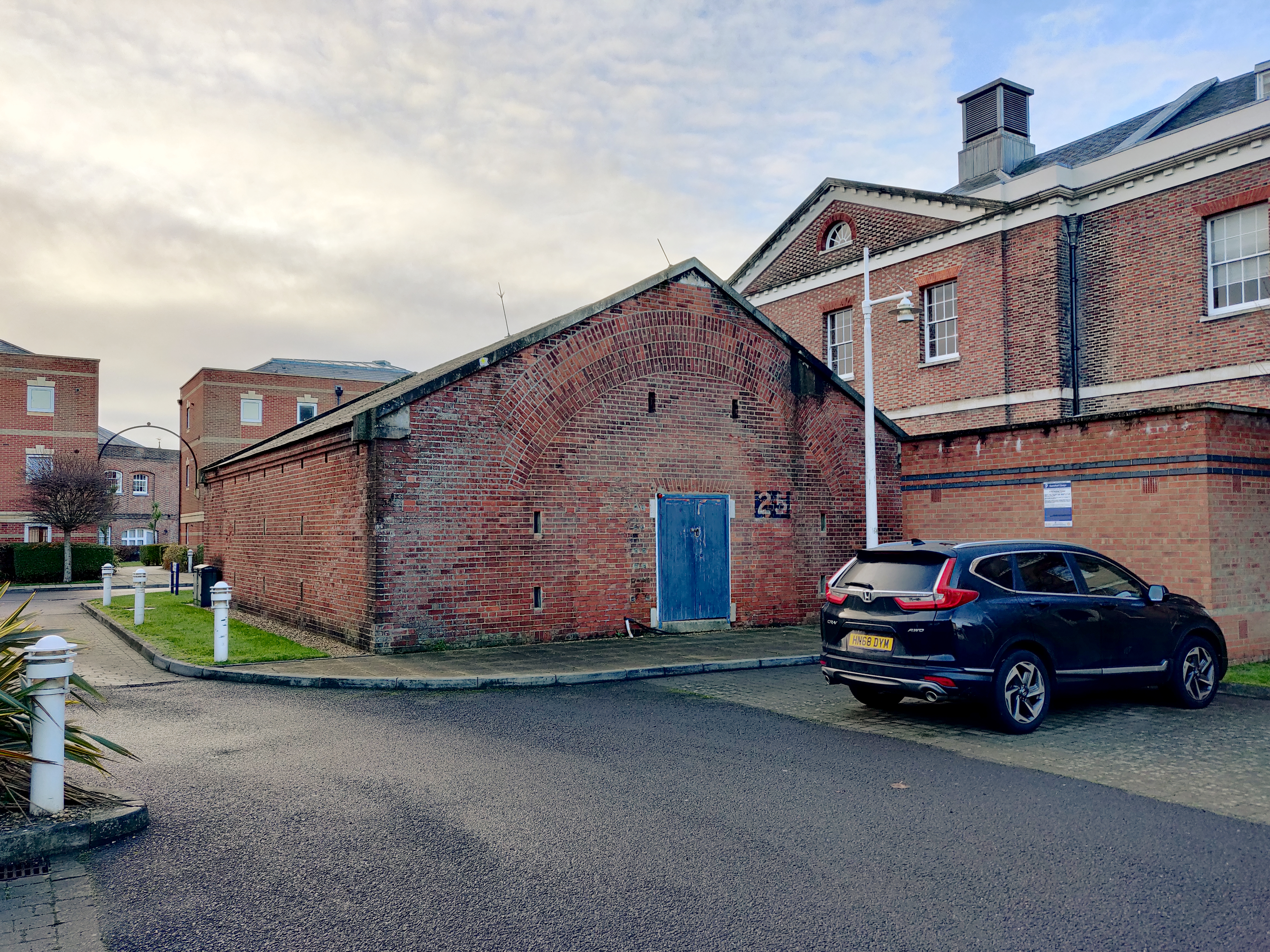
Former Shell Store (1856)

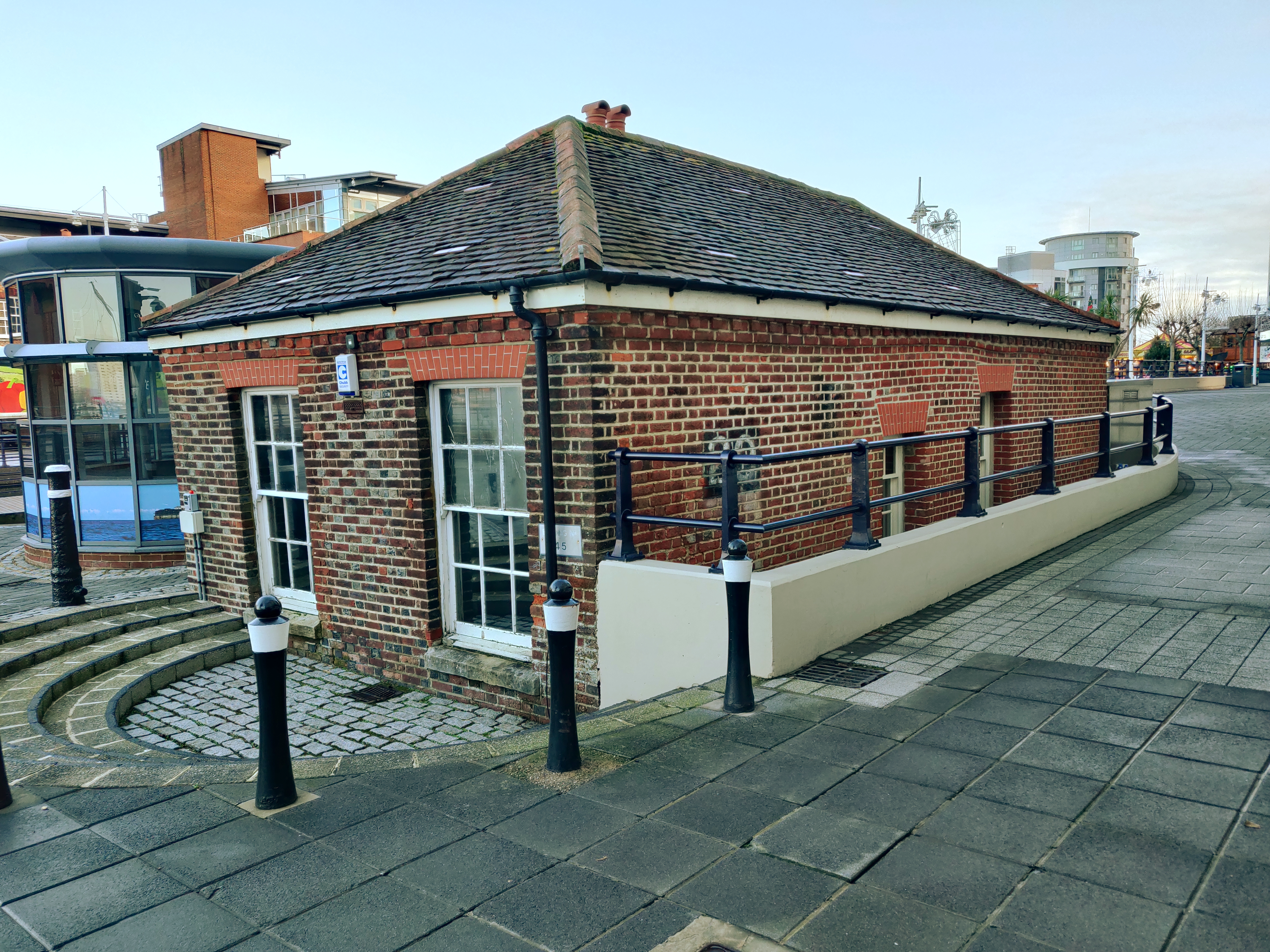
Wharf Foreman's office (late 19th century) next to Vernon creek

=== Victorian perimeter wall (1870) ===
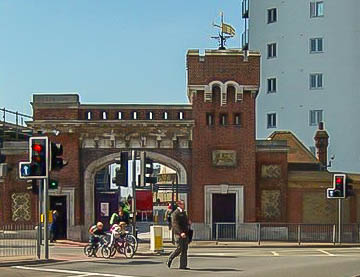
Former gatehouse and perimeter wall (1870s)

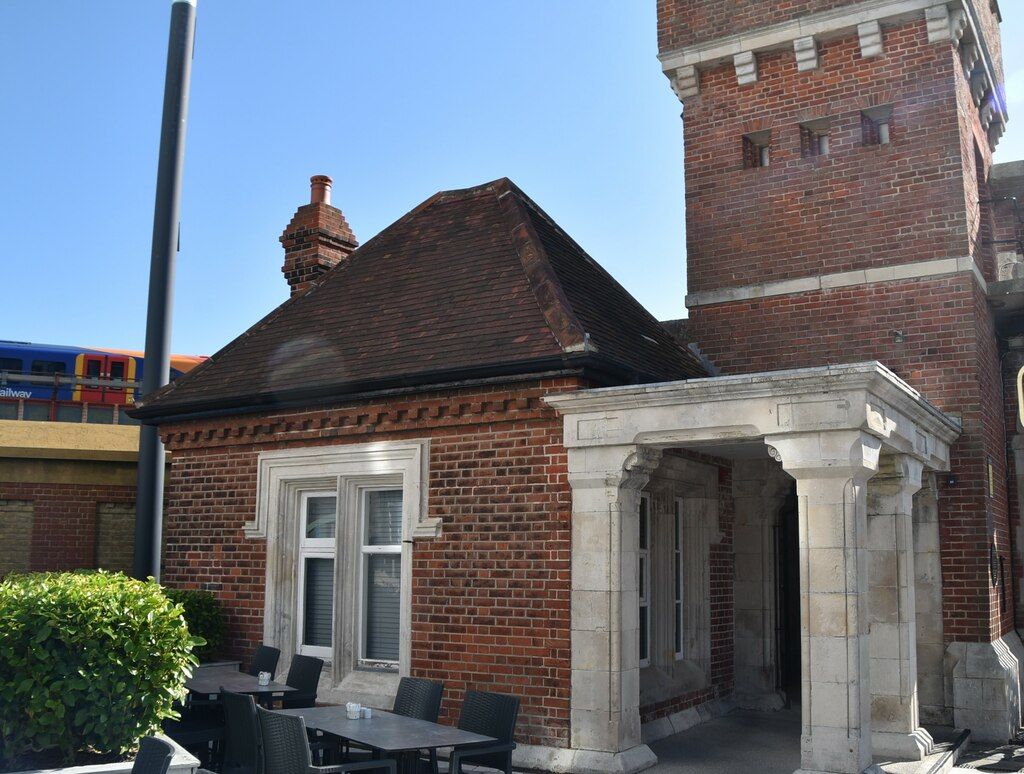
Porter's Lodge inside the Main Gate

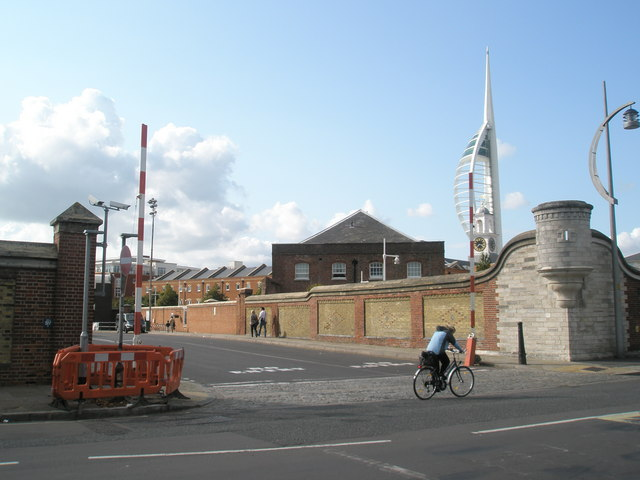
Former Royal Marine Infirmary (c.1814) within the perimeter wall

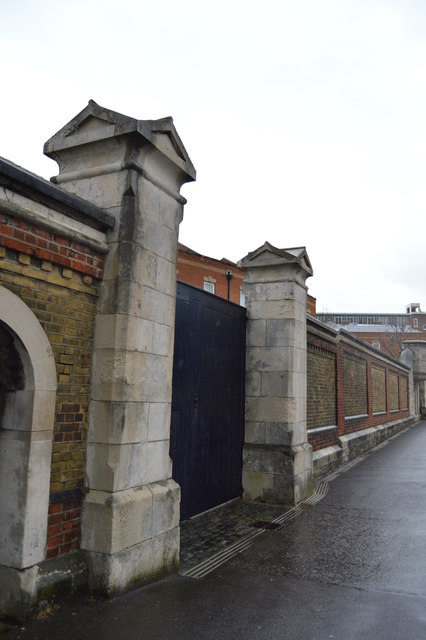
The old South Gate

=== Gunwharf Quays (2001) ===
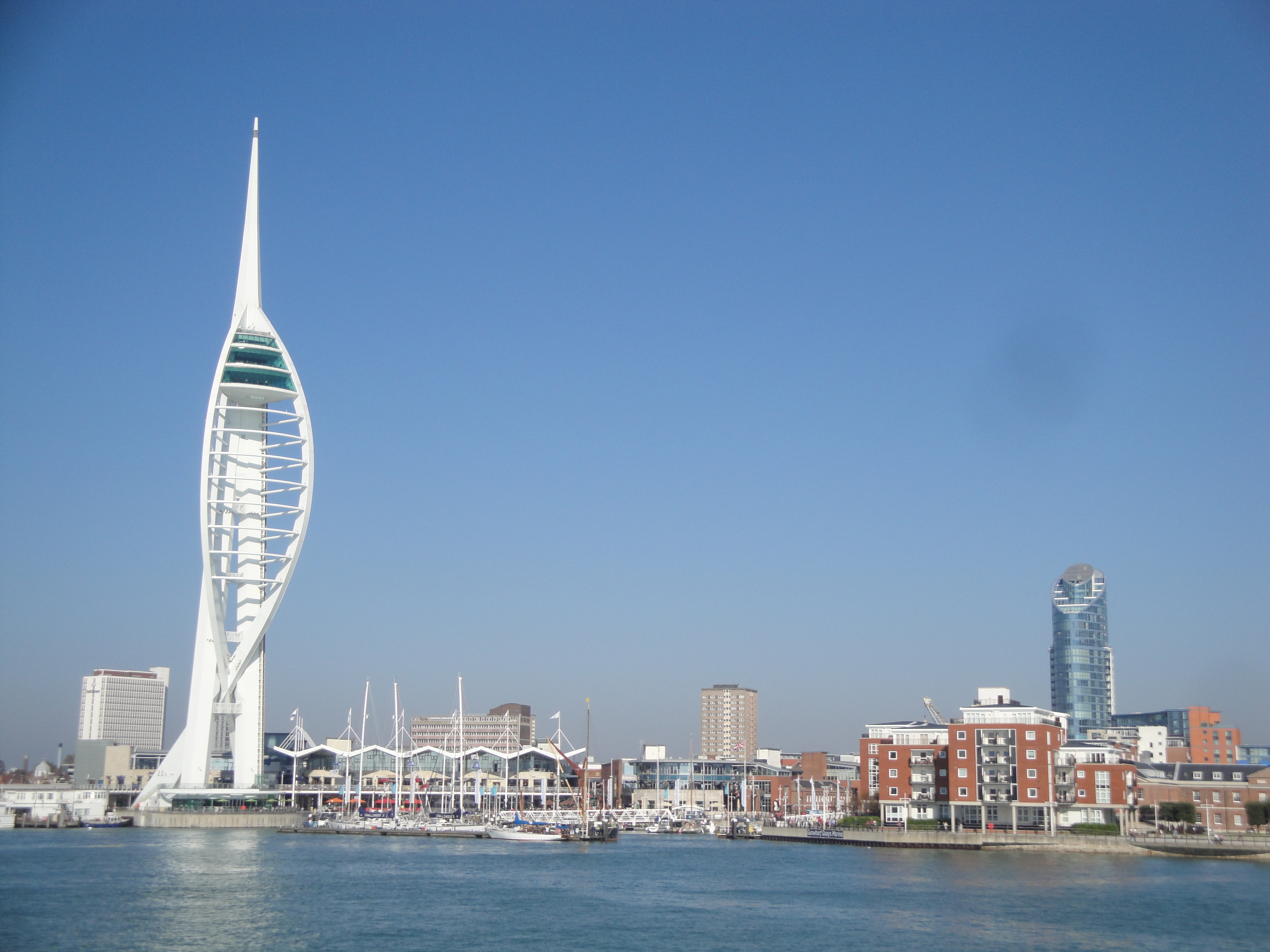
Spinnaker Tower and Gunwharf Quays viewed from the water

Entrance to Gunwharf Quays as seen from a train approaching Portsmouth Harbour railway station

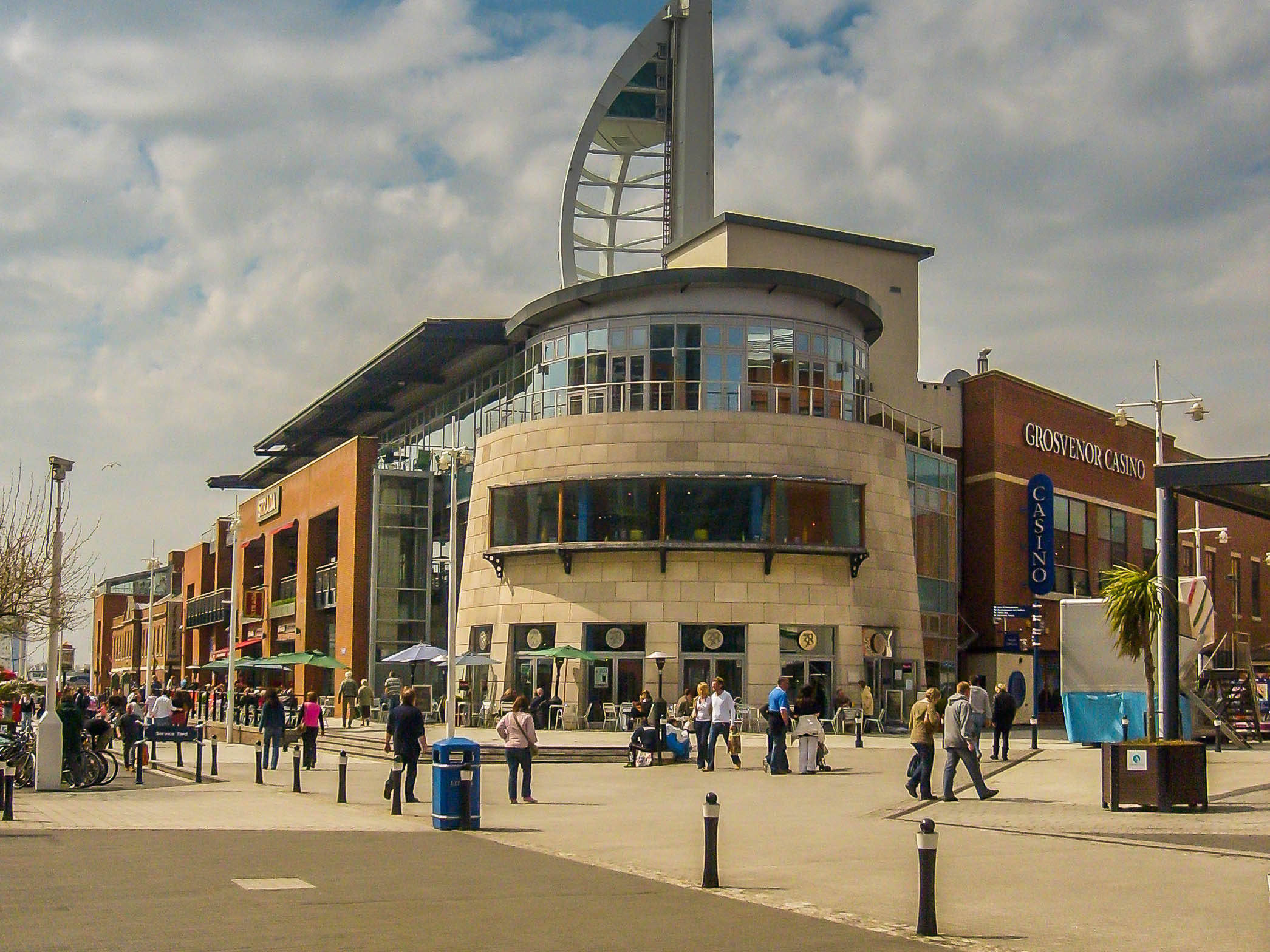
The East Plaza at Gunwharf Quays

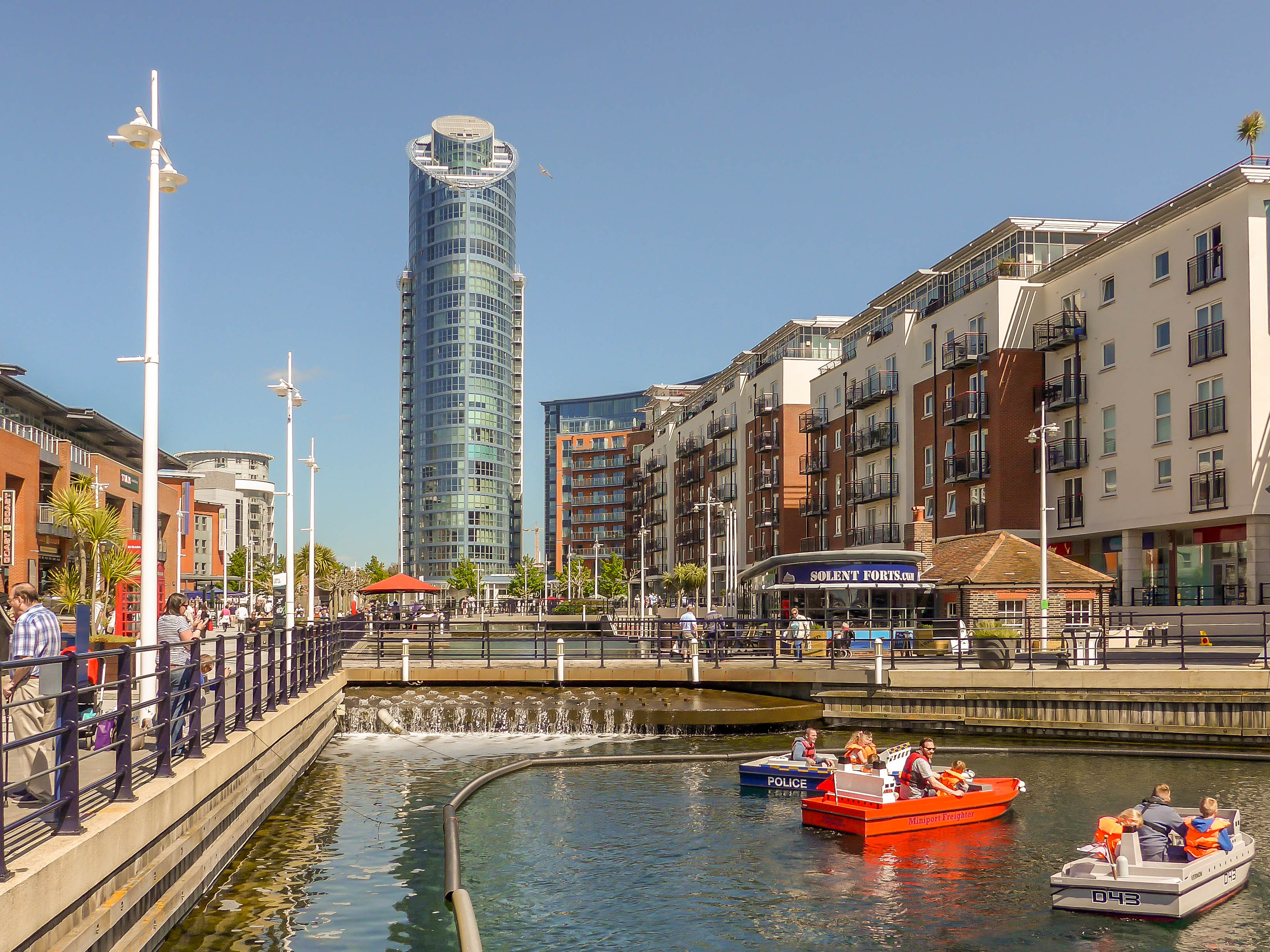
Canalside looking towards the Plaza.

== See also ==
- Portsmouth
- Berkeley Group plc
- Land Securities
- 1 Gunwharf Quays, a residential building at Gunwharf Quays

== Bibliography ==
- Underwood, Michael (2015). Gunwharf Quays: The History, Architecture, Conservation and Development of a Remarkable Military Site. Portsmouth: Tricorn Books.
