= List of tallest buildings and structures in Portsmouth =

Tall buildings in Portsmouth
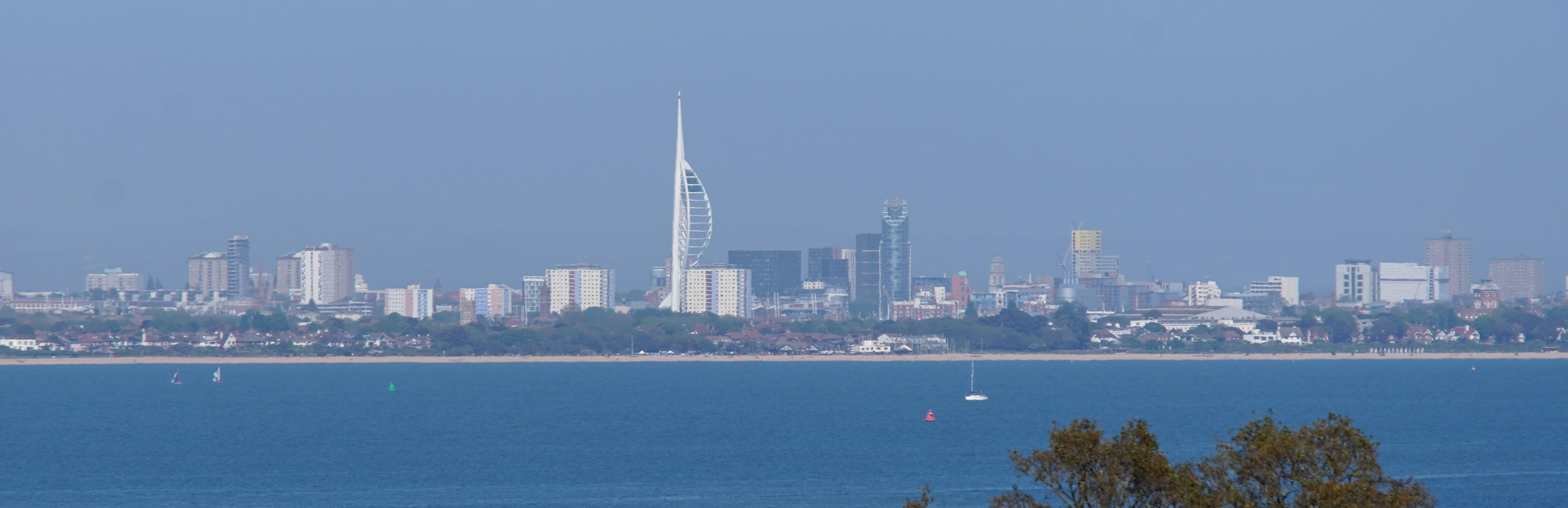
- Portsmouth viewed from the Isle of Wight, showing some of the city's tallest buildings
- Tallest building: 1 Gunwharf Quays (2008)
- Tallest building height: 98 m (322 ft)
- Tallest structure: Spinnaker Tower (2005)
- Tallest structure height: 170 m (560 ft)

Number of tall buildings
- Taller than 50 m (164 ft): 18
- Taller than 100 m (328 ft): 0

This list of tallest buildings and structures in Portsmouth ranks buildings and other structures by height in Portsmouth, United Kingdom, that are at least 40 m (130 ft) tall.

The tallest building in the city is 1 Gunwharf Quays at 98 m (322 ft), which has been the tallest building in Hampshire since its completion in 2008. The Spinnaker Tower is the city's tallest structure at 170 m (560 ft), completed in 2005; it does not count as a building because it has no floors.

== Completed ==
This lists buildings in Portsmouth that are at least 40 m (130 ft) tall.

An equal sign (=) following a rank indicates the same height between two or more structures.

Rank	Name	Image	Height m (ft)	Floors	Year completed	Primary use	Notes
1	Spinnaker Tower		170 (558)	4	2005	Observation	
2	1 Gunwharf Quays		98 (321)	26	2008	Residential	Also known as "The Lipstick"
3	Greetham Street		73 (240)	25	2016	Residential	
4	Ladywood House		72 (236)	24	1971	Residential	
=5	Crown Place		68 (223)	23	2018	Residential	
5=	14 Dock Crane		68 (223)	N/A	2020	Industrial	
7	Portsmouth Energy Recovery Facility		65 (213)	N/A	2005	Industrial	
8	Admiralty Quarter Tower		64 (211)	22	2008	Residential	
9	Europa House		63 (207)	18	1969	Office	
=10	HMS Victory		62 (205)	5	1765	Museum	
=10	Stanhope House		62 (205)	19	2020	Residential	
12	Catherine House		61 (200)	15	1973	Office	Formerly known as Zurich House
=13	Barkis House		60 (197)	18	1965	Residential	
=13	Nickleby House		60 (197)	18	1965	Residential	
=15	Millgate House		57 (187)	21	1964	Residential	
=15	Sara Robinson House		57 (187)	18	1967	Residential	
17	Travelodge Stanhope Road		55 (179)	11	2020	Hotel	
18	Portsmouth Guildhall		54 (177)	3	1890	Civic	
=19	Barnard Tower		51 (167)	13		Residential	
=19	Edgbaston House		51 (167)	18	1967	Residential	
=19	Handsworth House		51 (167)	18	1967	Residential	
=19	St Mary's Church		51 (167)	N/A	1887	Religion	
=19	Tipton House		51 (167)	18	1966	Residential	
24	Trafalgar Hall		50 (164)	7	2002	Residential	
25	Park Building		48 (157)	5	1908	Education	
26	BVT Shed		44 (144)	1	2009	Industrial	
27	Sails of the South		43 (141)	N/A	2001	Sculpture	
=28	Baltic House		41 (135)	11		Office	
=28	Brunel House		41 (135)	12	1968	Office	
=28	Wingfield House		41 (135)	11		Office	
=31	Copperfield House		40 (131)	13		Residential	
=31	Pickwick House		40 (131)	13	1963	Residential	
=31	Rose Tower		40 (131)	13		Residential	

== Demolished ==
This lists buildings and structures in Portsmouth that were at least 40 m (130 ft) tall and have since been demolished.

Rank	Name	Image	Height m (ft)	Floors	Year completed	Year demolished	Primary use	Notes
1	Arrol crane		61 (200)	N/A	1911	1983	Industrial	
2=	Leamington House		52 (171)	18	1966	2022	Residential	
2=	Horatia House		52 (171)	18	1965	2022	Residential	

== Timeline of tallest buildings and structures ==
The history of tall buildings in Portsmouth only really began in the 1960s and 1970s. The 170 m (560 ft) Spinnaker Tower has been the tallest structure in the city since 2005.

Year tallest	Name	Image	Height (m)	Height (ft)
1130–1693	Portchester Castle - Great Tower		30	98
1693–1880	Portsmouth Cathedral		37	121
1887–1890	St Mary's Church, Portsea		51	167
1890–1912	Portsmouth Guildhall	Portsmouth Guildhall 20180617	53.5	176
1912–1969	240/250-ton Arrol crane, HMNB Portsmouth		61	200
1969–1971	Europa House		63	207
1971–2005	Ladywood House		72	236
2005–present	Spinnaker Tower		170	558
